= The Coral discography =

- Studio albums: 13
- Extended plays: 4
- Compilation albums: 1
- Singles: 18
- Music videos: 17

This is the discography of The Coral, an English indie rock, psychedelic folk and indie pop band. The Coral have released thirteen studio albums, one compilation album, eighteen singles and four extended plays.

== Albums ==
=== Studio albums ===
Title	Details	Peak chart positions										Certifications
Title	Details	UK	BEL	FRA	GER	IRL	JPN	NOR	SCO	SWE	US	Certifications
The Coral	Released: 29 July 2002; Label: Deltasonic	5	—	118	—	41	97	—	3	—	189	BPI: Platinum
Magic and Medicine	Released: 28 July 2003; Label: Deltasonic	1	39	64	99	14	69	20	1	60	—	BPI: Gold
Nightfreak and the Sons of Becker	Released: 26 January 2004; Label: Deltasonic	5	—	59	—	35	68	—	4	—	—	
The Invisible Invasion	Released: 23 May 2005; Label: Deltasonic	3	—	104	—	16	53	—	6	—	—	BPI: Gold
Roots & Echoes	Released: 6 August 2007; Label: Deltasonic	8	—	84	—	33	80	—	10	—	—	
Butterfly House	Released: 12 July 2010; Label: Deltasonic	16	—	88	51	74	172	—	23	—	—	
The Curse of Love	Released: 20 October 2014; Label: Skeleton Key	127	—	—	—	—	—	—	—	—	—	
Distance Inbetween	Released: 4 March 2016; Label: Ignition	13	69	125	—	82	—	—	13	—	—	
Move Through the Dawn	Released: 17 August 2018; Label: Ignition	14	150	170	—	—	—	—	14	—	—	
Coral Island	Released: 30 April 2021; Label: Run On, Modern Sky UK	2	—	—	52	62	—	—	3	—	—	
Sea of Mirrors	Released: 8 September 2023; Label: Run On, Modern Sky UK	3	—	—	—	—	—	—	2	—	—	
Holy Joe's Coral Island Medicine Show	Released: 8 September 2023; Label: Run on, Modern Sky UK	36	—	—	—	—	—	—	5	—	—	
388	Released: 21 May 2026; Label: Run On											
"—" denotes releases that did not chart

=== Compilation albums ===
Title	Album details	Peak chart positions			Certifications (sales threshold)
Title	Album details	UK	IRL	SCO	Certifications (sales threshold)
Singles Collection	Released: 15 September 2008; Label: Deltasonic	13	26	10	BPI: Silver

== EPs ==
- The Oldest Path EP (2001)
- Skeleton Key EP (2002)
- Calendars & Clocks EP (2004)
- iTunes Festival: London (2007)
- Holy Mountain Picnic Massacre Blues (2016)

== Singles ==
List of singles, with selected chart positions, showing year released and album name
Title	Year	Peak chart positions								Certifications	Album
Title	Year	UK	UK Indie	BEL	IRL	NED	POL	SCO	UKR	Certifications	Album
"Shadows Fall"	2001	180	—	—	—	—	—	—	—		Non-album single
"Goodbye"	2002	21	—	—	—	—	—	28	—		The Coral
"Dreaming of You"	2002	13	—	—	—	—	—	14	—	BPI: Platinum	The Coral
"Don't Think You're the First"	2003	10	—	—	—	—	—	11	—		Magic and Medicine
"Pass It On"	2003	5	—	—	—	—	—	5	—	BPI: Silver	Magic and Medicine
"Secret Kiss"	2003	25	—	—	—	—	—	28	—		Magic and Medicine
"Bill McCai"	2003	23	—	—	—	—	—	28	—		Magic and Medicine
"In the Morning"	2005	6	—	—	28	—	45	5	154	BPI: Platinum	The Invisible Invasion
"Something Inside of Me"	2005	41	—	—	—	—	—	83	—		The Invisible Invasion
"Who's Gonna Find Me"	2007	25	—	—	—	—	—	11	180		Roots & Echoes
"Jacqueline"	2007	44	—	—	—	—	—	18	—		Roots & Echoes
"Put the Sun Back"	2008	64	—	—	—	—	—	64	—		Roots & Echoes
"Being Somebody Else"	2008	— (Note: "Being Somebody Else" did not enter the UK Singles Chart, but peaked at number 31 on the UK Physical Singles Chart Top 100.)	—	—	—	—	—	24	—		Singles Collection
"1000 Years"	2010	188	22	78	—	98	—	—	—		Butterfly House
"More than a Lover"	2010	— (Note: "More than a Lover" did not enter the UK Singles Chart, but peaked at number 62 on the UK Physical Singles Chart Top 100.)	—	—	—	—	—	—	—		Butterfly House
"Walking in the Winter"	2010	— (Note: "Walking in the Winter" did not enter the UK Singles Chart, but peaked at number 59 on the UK Physical Singles Chart Top 100.)	—	—	—	—	—	—	—		Butterfly House
"Two Faces"	2011	— (Note: "Two Faces" did not enter the UK Singles Chart, but peaked at number 24 on the UK Physical Singles Chart Top 100.)	—	—	—	—	—	—	—		Butterfly House
"Chasing the Tail of a Dream"	2015	— (Note: "Chasing the Tail of a Dream" did not enter the UK Singles Chart, but peaked at number 3 on the UK Physical Singles Chart Top 100.)	—	—	—	—	—	—	—		Distance Inbetween
"Miss Fortune"	2016	—	—	—	—	—	—	—	—		Distance Inbetween
"Holy Revelation"	2017	— (Note: "Holy Revelation" did not enter the UK Singles Chart, but peaked at number 4 on the UK Physical Singles Chart Top 100.)	—	—	—	—	—	—	—		Distance Inbetween
"Sweet Release"	2018	— (Note: "Sweet Release" did not enter the UK Singles Chart, but peaked at number 1 on the UK Physical Singles Chart Top 100.)	—	—	—	—	—	—	—		Move Through the Dawn
"Eyes Like Pearls"	2018	—	—	—	—	—	—	—	—		Move Through the Dawn
"After the Fair"	2018	—	—	—	—	—	—	—	—		Move Through the Dawn
"Faceless Angel"	2021	—	—	—	—	—	—	×	—		Coral Island
"Lover Undiscovered"	2021	—	—	—	—	—	—	×	—		Coral Island
"Vacancy"	2021	—	—	—	—	—	—	×	—		Coral Island
"Christmas On Coral Island"	2025	— (Note: "Christmas On Coral Island" did not enter the UK Singles Chart, but peaked at number 36 on the UK Singles Sales Chart Top 100.)	—	—	—	—	—	×	—		Non-album single
"—" denotes releases that did not chart. "×" denotes periods where charts did not exist or were not archived.

== Music videos ==
Title	Year	Director(s)
"Skeleton Key"	2002	Laurence Easeman
"Goodbye"	2002	Laurence Easeman
"Dreaming of You"	2002	Laurence Easeman
"Don't Think You're the First"	2003	Ian Skelly
"Pass It On"	2003	Goodtimes
"Secret Kiss"	2003	James Slater
"Bill McCai"	2003	Goodtimes
"In the Morning"	2005	Goodtimes
"Something Inside of Me"	2005	Goodtimes
"Who's Gonna Find Me"	2007	Daniel Wolfe
"Jacqueline"	2007	Goodtimes
"Put the Sun Back"	2008	James Slater
"Being Somebody Else"	2008	James Slater
"1000 Years"	2010	James Slater
"More than a Lover"	2010	James Slater
"Chasing the Tail of a Dream"	2015	Dominic Foster
"Miss Fortune"	2016	

== Other appearances ==
=== Guest appearances ===
- Ian Broudie – Tales Told (2004)
- The Lightning Seeds – Four Winds (2009)
- Ian Skelly – Cut from a Star (2012)
- James Skelly & the Intenders – Love Undercover (2013)
- Sundowners – Sundowners (2015)
- The Serpent Power – The Serpent Power (2015)

=== Compilation appearances ===
- Help!: A Day in the Life (2005) – "It Was Nothing"
- Sound '07 (2007) – "Come Go With Me"

== See also ==
- List of songs recorded by The Coral
