= List of songs recorded by the Coral =

The Coral are an English indie rock/neo-psychedelia band from Hoylake, the Wirral formed in 1996. As of 2016, they have recorded over 150 songs, released on eight studio albums, one compilation album, three EPs and eighteen singles. The band's first single "Shadows Fall" was released in 2001 and four of their songs - "Dreaming of You" (from The Coral), "Don't Think You're the First" and "Pass It On" (from Magic and Medicine) and "In the Morning" (from The Invisible Invasion) have appeared in the top 20 of the UK Singles Chart.

The majority of The Coral songs are written by lead singer and rhythm guitarist James Skelly, with many songs also being co-written by keyboardist Nick Power. Lead guitarist Lee Southall has written some of their songs, whilst all members of the group have co-written at several points and the band has also written together in collaboration.

== Scope of list ==
The scope of this list includes all songs appearing on any studio album, compilation album, EP or single by The Coral or any various artist compilation album containing a song by The Coral.

== Songs ==
Key
†	Released as a commercial single

Song title	Writer(s)	Release title	Year
"1000 Years"†	James Skelly, Ian Skelly, Lee Southall	Butterfly House	2010
"All of Our Love"	James Skelly, Nick Power	Magic and Medicine	2003
"Another Turn in the Lock"	James Skelly, Lee Southall	"Goodbye"	2002
"Another Way"	Lee Southall	Butterfly House (bonus disc)	2010
"Answer Me"	James Skelly, Nick Power, Paul Duffy	"Dreaming of You"	2002
"Arabian Sand"	The Coral	The Invisible Invasion	2005
"Auntie's Operation"	James Skelly, Nick Power, Lee Southall	Nightfreak and the Sons of Becker	2004
"Badman"	James Skelly, Nick Power	The Coral	2002
"Being Somebody Else"†	James Skelly	Singles Collection	2008
"Beyond the Sun"	James Skelly	Distance Inbetween	2016
"Bill McCai"†	James Skelly	Magic and Medicine	2003
"The Box"	James Skelly, Nick Power	"Something Inside of Me"	2005
"Boy at the Window"	James Skelly	"Bill McCai"	2003
"Butterfly House"	James Skelly, Nick Power	Butterfly House	2010
"Bye Bye Love" (Note: Live concert recording) (Note: The Everly Brothers cover)	Boudleaux Bryant, Felice Bryant	Singles Collection	2008
"Calendars and Clocks"	James Skelly, Nick Power	The Coral	2002
"Careless Hands"	James Skelly, Bill Ryder-Jones	Magic and Medicine	2003
"The Case of Arthur Tannen"	James Skelly, Nick Power	"Something Inside of Me"	2005
"Chasing the Tail of a Dream"†	James Skelly	Distance Inbetween	2016
"Circles"	The Coral	Butterfly House (bonus disc)	2010
"Cobwebs"	James Skelly, Ian Skelly, Lee Southall	Roots & Echoes	2007
"Come Go With Me" (Note: The Del-Vikings cover)	Clarence Quick	Sound '07	2007
"Come Home"	James Skelly, Nick Power, Bill Ryder-Jones	The Invisible Invasion	2005
"Coming Through the Rye"	James Skelly, Lee Southall	Butterfly House (bonus disc)	2010
"Coney Island"	James Skelly	Butterfly House	2010
"Confessions of A.D.D.D."	James Skelly	Magic and Medicine	2003
"The Conjurer"	James Skelly, Nick Power	"Something Inside of Me"	2005
"Connector"	James Skelly, Nick Power	Distance Inbetween	2016
"Cripples Crown"	James Skelly, Nick Power	The Invisible Invasion	2005
"The Cry of the City"	James Skelly	Singles Collection	2008
"The Curse of Love (Part One)"	James Skelly	The Curse of Love	2014
"The Curse of Love (Part Two)"	James Skelly	The Curse of Love	2014
"The Dance Lingers On"	James Skelly	"Put the Sun Back"	2008
"Darkness"	James Skelly	Skeleton Key EP	2002
"Depth of Her Smile"	James Skelly	"Being Somebody Else"	2008
"Distance Inbetween"	James Skelly	Distance Inbetween	2016
"Don't Think You're the First"†	James Skelly	Magic and Medicine	2003
"Dream in August"	James Skelly	Butterfly House (bonus disc)	2010
"Dreaming of You"†	James Skelly	The Coral	2002
"Dreamland"		Butterfly House Acoustic	2010
"Dressed Like a Cow"	James Skelly	Skeleton Key EP	2002
"End Credits"	Nick Power	Distance Inbetween	2016
"Eskimo Lament"	Nick Power	Magic and Medicine	2003
"Everybody's Talkin'" (Note: Fred Neil cover)	Fred Neil	Singles Collection	2008
"Falling All Around You"	James Skelly, Nick Power	Butterfly House	2010
"Far from the Crowd"	James Skelly	The Invisible Invasion	2005
"Fear Machine"	James Skelly	Distance Inbetween	2016
"Fireflies"	James Skelly, Bill Ryder-Jones	Roots & Echoes	2007
"Flies"		The Oldest Path EP	2001
"Follow the Sun"	Lee Southall	"Dreaming of You"	2002
"From a Leaf to a Tree"	James Skelly	"Bill McCai"	2003
"The Game"	James Skelly	The Curse of Love	2014
"Gently"	James Skelly	"Two Faces" (Note: Also released on The Curse of Love (2014))	2011
"Ghostriders in the Sky" (Note: Stan Jones cover)	Stan Jones	"Jacqueline"	2007
"Gina Jones"	James Skelly	"In the Morning"	2005
"God Knows"	James Skelly, Lee Southall	The Oldest Path EP (Note: Re-recording also released on "The Secret Kiss" (2003))	2001
"The Golden Bough"	James Skelly	Singles Collection	2008
"Good Fortune"	James Skelly, Nick Power	"Goodbye"	2002
"Goodbye"†	James Skelly, Nick Power	The Coral	2002
"Green Is the Colour"	James Skelly, Nick Power	Butterfly House	2010
"Grey Harpoon"	James Skelly, Nick Power	Nightfreak and the Sons of Becker	2004
"Heartaches & Pancakes"	James Skelly, Nick Power	"Pass It On"	2003
"Holy Revelation"	James Skelly, Nick Power	Distance Inbetween	2016
"I Forgot My Name"	The Coral	Nightfreak and the Sons of Becker	2004
"I Remember When"	James Skelly	The Coral	2002
"I'll Feel a Whole Lot Better" (Note: The Byrds cover)	Gene Clark	"Walking in the Winter"	2010
"The Image of Richard Burton as Crom"	The Coral	"In the Morning"	2005
"In the Forest"	James Skelly, Nick Power	Magic and Medicine	2003
"In the Morning"†	James Skelly	The Invisible Invasion	2005
"In the Rain"	James Skelly, Nick Power	Roots & Echoes	2007
"Into the Sun"	James Skelly	Butterfly House (bonus disc)	2010
"It Was Nothing"	James Skelly, Nick Power	Help!: A Day in the Life	2005
"It's in Your Hands"	The Coral	Singles Collection	2008
"It's You"	James Skelly, Nick Power	Distance Inbetween	2016
"Jacqueline"†	James Skelly, Nick Power	Roots & Echoes	2007
"Keep Me Company"	James Skelly	Nightfreak and the Sons of Becker	2004
"The King Has Died"		"1000 Years"	2010
"Late Afternoon"	James Skelly	The Invisible Invasion	2005
"Leaving Today"	James Skelly, Lee Southall	The Invisible Invasion	2005
"Leeslunchboxbyblueleadandthevelcrounderpants"	The Coral	"In the Morning"	2005
"Liezah"	James Skelly, Nick Power	Magic and Medicine	2003
"Lover's Paradise"	James Skelly, Nick Power	Nightfreak and the Sons of Becker	2004
"Michael's Song"	James Skelly, Nick Power	Singles Collection	2008
"Migraine"	James Skelly	Nightfreak and the Sons of Becker	2004
"Milkwood Blues"	James Skelly	Magic and Medicine	2003
"Million Eyes"	James Skelly	Distance Inbetween	2016
"Miss Fortune"	James Skelly, Nick Power	Distance Inbetween	2016
"Monkey to the Moon"	The Coral	Singles Collection	2008
"More than a Lover"†	James Skelly, Ian Skelly	Butterfly House	2010
"Music at Night"	James Skelly, Bill Ryder-Jones, Marcus Holdaway	Roots & Echoes	2007
"Nine Times the Colour Red"	James Skelly	The Curse of Love	2014
"North Parade"	James Skelly, Lee Southall, Paul Duffy	Butterfly House	2010
"Nosferatu"	James Skelly	"Bill McCai"	2003
"Not So Lonely"	James Skelly	Roots & Echoes	2007
"Not the Girl"	James Skelly	"Secret Kiss"	2003
"The Oldest Path"†	James Skelly	The Oldest Path EP	2001
"One Winters Day"	Nick Power	"Put the Sun Back"	2008
"The Operator"	James Skelly	The Invisible Invasion	2005
"Pass It On"†	James Skelly	Magic and Medicine	2003
"Pictures from the Other Side"	James Skelly	"Jacqueline"	2007
"Precious Eyes"	James Skelly	Nightfreak and the Sons of Becker	2004
"Put the Sun Back"†	James Skelly	Roots & Echoes	2007
"Rebecca You"	James Skelly, Nick Power, Bill Ryder-Jones	Roots & Echoes	2007
"Remember Me"	James Skelly	Roots & Echoes	2007
"Return Her to Me"	James Skelly, Nick Power	Singles Collection	2008
"Reward" (Note: The Teardrop Explodes cover)	Julian Cope	Singles Collection	2008
"Roving Jewel"	James Skelly, Ian Skelly	Butterfly House	2010
"Run Run"	James Skelly	"Pass It On"	2003
"Sandhills"	James Skelly	Butterfly House	2010
"Seagulls"	James Skelly, Lee Southall	Singles Collection	2008
"The Second Self"	James Skelly	The Curse of Love	2014
"Secret Kiss"†	James Skelly	Magic and Medicine	2003
"See My Love"	James Skelly, Nick Power	"Secret Kiss"	2003
"See-Through Bergerac"	James Skelly, Lee Southall	"Don't Think You're the First"	2003
"Shadows Fall"†	The Coral	The Coral (Note: Different recording also released on "Shadows Fall" (2001))	2002
"She Runs the River"	James Skelly	Distance Inbetween	2016
"She Sings the Mourning"	James Skelly, Nick Power	The Invisible Invasion	2005
"She's Coming Around"	James Skelly, Nick Power	Butterfly House	2010
"She's Got a Reason"	James Skelly	Roots & Echoes	2007
"Sheriff John Brown"	James Skelly	Skeleton Key EP	2002
"Short Ballad"	James Skelly	The Oldest Path EP	2001
"Simian Technology"	The Coral	The Coral (LP version)	2002
"Simon Diamond" (Note: Also known as "The Ballad of Simon Diamond")	James Skelly, Nick Power	The Coral	2002
"Skeleton Key"†	James Skelly, Nick Power	The Coral	2002
"So Long Ago"	James Skelly, Nick Power, Bill Ryder-Jones	The Invisible Invasion	2005
"Something Inside of Me"†	James Skelly	The Invisible Invasion	2005
"Song of the Corn"	Nick Power	Nightfreak and the Sons of Becker	2004
"Sorrow or the Song"	James Skelly, Nick Power	Nightfreak and the Sons of Becker	2004
"Spanish Main"	James Skelly	The Coral	2002
"A Sparrow's Song"	James Skelly	"Shadows Fall"	2001
"Sweet Sue"	James Skelly	"Dreaming of You"	2002
"Talkin' Gypsy Market Blues"	James Skelly	Magic and Medicine	2003
"Teenage Machine Age"	The Coral	"Don't Think You're the First"	2003
"Tiger Lily"	James Skelly	"Don't Think You're the First"	2003
"Time Travel" (Note: Hidden track)	James Skelly	The Coral	2002
"Travelling Circus"	James Skelly, Nick Power	"Goodbye"	2002
"Two Faces"†	James Skelly	Butterfly House	2010
"Unforgiven"		"Chasing the Tail of a Dream"	2015
"Venom Cable"	The Coral	Nightfreak and the Sons of Becker	2004
"View from the Mirror"	James Skelly	The Curse of Love	2014
"The Visitor"	James Skelly, Ian Murray	"Jacqueline"	2007
"The Voice"	James Skelly, Nick Power	"Who's Gonna Find Me"	2007
"The Watcher in the Distance"	James Skelly	The Curse of Love	2014
"Waiting for the Heartaches"	James Skelly	The Coral	2002
"Walking in the Winter"†	James Skelly, Lee Southall	Butterfly House	2010
"A Warning to the Curious"	James Skelly, Nick Power, Bill Ryder-Jones	The Invisible Invasion	2005
"When All the Birds Have Flown"	James Skelly	Singles Collection	2008
"When Good Times Go Bad"	James Skelly	"Bill McCai"	2003
"White Bird"	James Skelly, Nick Power, Ian Skelly	Distance Inbetween	2016
"Who's Gonna Find Me"†	James Skelly, Nick Power	Roots & Echoes	2007
"Who's That Knockin'?"	James Skelly, Nick Power, Bill Ryder-Jones	"Secret Kiss"	2003
"Why Does the Sun Come Up?"	The Coral	Nightfreak and the Sons of Becker	2004
"Wildfire"	Nick Power	The Coral	2002
"Willow Song"	James Skelly, Lee Southall	"Put the Sun Back"	2008
"Witchcraft"	James Skelly	"Don't Think You're the First"	2003
"Wrapped in Blue"	James Skelly	The Curse of Love	2014
"You Closed the Door"	James Skelly	The Curse of Love	2014

== See also ==
- The Coral discography
