= Singles Collection (The Coral album) =

Compilation album by The Coral
- Released: 15 September 2008
- Recorded: 1999–2008
- Genre: Indie rock
- Label: Deltasonic
- Producers: The Coral, Ian Broudie, Adrain Utley, Geoff Barrow, Craig Silvey, Mike Hunter, Dan Hulme

The Coral chronology
Roots & Echoes (2007)	Singles Collection (2008)	Butterfly House (2010)

Professional ratings
Review scores
Source	Rating
AllMusic	4/5 stars
Contactmusic.com	9/10
Drowned in Sound	(7/10)
The Independent	5/5 stars
The Mirror	4/5 stars
NME	9/10
The Times	4/5 stars

Singles Collection is a compilation album by The Coral, released on 15 September 2008 in the United Kingdom on the Deltasonic label. It featured a new song "Being Somebody Else", which was released as a single on 8 September 2008.

== Track listing ==
Disc 1: Singles Collection
No.	Title	Writer(s)	Length
1.	"Dreaming of You" (from The Coral)	James Skelly	2:21
2.	"In the Morning" (from The Invisible Invasion)	J. Skelly	2:33
3.	"Pass It On" (from Magic and Medicine)	J. Skelly	2:19
4.	"Don't Think You're the First" (from Magic and Medicine)	J. Skelly	4:05
5.	"Jacqueline" (from Roots & Echoes)	J. Skelly, Nick Power	3:29
6.	"Secret Kiss" (from Magic and Medicine)	J. Skelly	2:57
7.	"Goodbye" (from The Coral)	J. Skelly, Power	4:03
8.	"Shadows Fall" (single version)	The Coral	3:14
9.	"Liezah" (from Magic and Medicine)	J. Skelly, Power	3:33
10.	"Who's Gonna Find Me" (from Roots & Echoes)	J. Skelly, Power	3:27
11.	"Bill McCai" (from Magic and Medicine)	J. Skelly	2:39
12.	"Put the Sun Back" (from Roots & Echoes)	J. Skelly	3:02
13.	"Something Inside of Me" (from The Invisible Invasion)	J. Skelly	2:26
14.	"Being Somebody Else" (new song)	J. Skelly	2:39

Disc 2: Mysteries & Rarities
No.	Title	Writer(s)	Length
1.	"When All the Birds Have Flown" (Roots & Echoes outtake)	J. Skelly	4:22
2.	"The Golden Bough" (new song)	J. Skelly	2:37
3.	"Michael's Song" (new song)	J. Skelly, Power	2:51
4.	"The Cry of the City" (new song)	J. Skelly	3:21
5.	"Everybody's Talkin'" (live from Isle of Man)	Fred Neil	2:43
6.	"Far from the Crowd" (live at Elevator Studios)	J. Skelly	3:33
7.	"She's Got a Reason" (live at Elevator Studios)	J. Skelly	4:30
8.	"Return Her to Me" (Magic and Medicine outtake)	J. Skelly, Power	2:37
9.	"Monkey to the Moon" (The Invisible Invasion outtake)	The Coral	2:45
10.	"It Was Nothing" (from Help!: A Day in the Life)	J. Skelly, Power	2:54
11.	"Cobwebs" (8-track demo)	J. Skelly, Ian Skelly, Lee Southall	3:20
12.	"Simon Diamond" (original version)	J. Skelly, Power	2:30
13.	"Shadows Fall" (4-track instrumental)	The Coral	2:57
14.	"Calendars and Clocks" (demo)	J. Skelly, Power	3:45
15.	"Seagulls" (previously unreleased)	J. Skelly, Southall	1:47
16.	"Dreaming of You" (demo)	J. Skelly	1:52
17.	"It's in Your Hands" (demo)	The Coral	3:50
18.	"Reward" (live at The Queen, Liverpool)	Julian Cope	2:58
19.	"Bye Bye Love" (live from Isle of Man)	Boudleaux Bryant, Felice Bryant	1:59

iTunes bonus tracks
No.	Title	Writer(s)	Length
20.	"Don't Think You're the First" (live at Elevator Studios)	J. Skelly	4:12
21.	"Fireflies" (live at Elevator Studios)	J. Skelly, Bill Ryder-Jones	4:00

== Personnel ==
The Coral

- James Skelly – vocals, guitar, producer, arrangements
- Lee Southall – guitar, backing vocals (lead vocals on "Seagulls"), producer, arrangements
- Bill Ryder-Jones – guitar, trumpet, producer, arrangements, string arrangements
- Paul Duffy – bass guitar, backing vocals, saxophone, producer, arrangements
- Nick Power – keyboards ,backing vocals,producer, arrangements
- Ian Skelly – drums, producer, arrangements, artwork, design

Production

- Ian Broudie – producer, mixing (disc 1 tracks 1, 3, 4, 6, 7, 9, 11 & 14; disc 2 track 8)
- Adrian Utley – producer, engineer (disc 1 tracks 2 & 13; disc 2 tracks 9 & 10)
- Geoff Barrow – producer (disc 1 tracks 2 & 13; disc 2 tracks 9 & 10)
- Craig Silvey – producer, engineer (disc 1 tracks 5, 10 & 12; disc 2 track 1)
- Mike Hunter – producer, engineer, mixing (disc 1 track 8; disc 2 tracks 12 & 14)
- Dan Hulme – producer, engineer, mixing (disc 2 tracks 2–4, 6 & 7); engineer (disc 1 track 14)
- Jon Gray – engineer (disc 1 tracks 1, 3, 4, 6, 7, 9, 11; disc 2 track 8)
- Pat O'Shaughnessy – recording, mixing (disc 2 track 16)
- Dave McDonnell – recording (disc 2 track 11)
- Scott Clegg – recording (disc 2 track 18)
- Ben Booker – mixing (disc 2 track 19)
- Sean O'Hagan – string arrangements (disc 1 track 14)

Other personnel

- Kevin Power – artwork, design

== Charts ==
Chart (2008)	Peak position
Irish Albums (IRMA)	26
UK Albums (Official Charts)	13

== Certifications ==
Region	Certification	Certified units/sales
United Kingdom (BPI)	Gold	100,000^{‡}
^{‡} Sales+streaming figures based on certification alone.
