= List of UK Dance Albums Chart number ones of 2008 =

These are the Official Charts Company's UK Dance Chart number-one albums of 2008. The dates listed in the menus below represent the Saturday after the Sunday the chart was announced, as per the way the dates are given in chart publications such as the ones produced by Billboard, Guinness, and Virgin.

== Chart history ==
Issue date	Album	Artist(s)	Record label	Ref.
5 January	Anthems - 1991-2008	Various Artists	Ministry of Sound	
12 January	Anthems - 1991-2008	Various Artists	Ministry of Sound	
19 January	Clubbers Guide '08	Various Artists	Ministry of Sound	
26 January	Anthems - 1991-2008	Various Artists	Ministry of Sound	
2 February	Anthems - 1991-2008	Various Artists	Ministry of Sound	
9 February	Gilles Peterson In the House	Various Artists	In The House	
16 February	Made in the Dark	Hot Chip	EMI	
23 February	Made in the Dark	Hot Chip	EMI	
1 March	Made in the Dark	Hot Chip	EMI	
8 March	Version	Mark Ronson	Columbia	
15 March	Anthems - 1991-2008	Various Artists	Ministry of Sound	
22 March	Hercules and Love Affair	Hercules and Love Affair	DFA/EMI	
29 March	Hercules and Love Affair	Hercules and Love Affair	DFA/EMI	
5 April	Hed Kandi - Back to Love - The Mix	Various Artists	Hedkandi	
12 April	Clubland Classix - The Album of Your Life	Various Artists	AATW/UMTV	
19 April	Clubland Classix - The Album of Your Life	Various Artists	AATW/UMTV	
26 April	John Digweed - Transitions - Vol. 4	Various Artists	Renaissance	
3 May	Dave Pearce Trance Anthems 2008	Various Artists	Ministry of Sound	
10 May	Third	Portishead	Island	
17 May	Third	Portishead	Island	
24 May	In Silico	Pendulum	Warner Bros	
31 May	In Silico	Pendulum	Warner Bros	
7 June	Chilled - 1991-2008	Various Artists	Ministry of Sound	
14 June	Chilled - 1991-2008	Various Artists	Ministry of Sound	
21 June	Chilled - 1991-2008	Various Artists	Ministry of Sound	
28 June	Chilled - 1991-2008	Various Artists	Ministry of Sound	
5 July	Chilled - 1991-2008	Various Artists	Ministry of Sound	
12 July	Hed Kandi - The Mix - Summer 2008	Various Artists	Hed Kandi	
19 July	Hed Kandi - The Mix - Summer 2008	Various Artists	Hed Kandi	
26 July	Now You're Gone – The Album	Basshunter	Hard2Beat	
2 August	Version	Mark Ronson	Columbia	
9 August	Hed Kandi - Beach House	Various Artists	Hed Kandi	
16 August	Hardcore Til I Die	Various Artists	All Around The World	
23 August	Hardcore Til I Die	Various Artists	All Around The World	
30 August	Journey to the West	Damon Albarn	XL	
6 September	Journey to the West	Damon Albarn	XL	
13 September	Brotherhood	The Chemical Brothers	Virgin	
20 September	Sasha - Invol2ver	Various Artists	Global Underground	
27 September	Singles Collection	The Coral	Deltasonic	
4 October	Singles Collection	The Coral	Deltasonic	
11 October	140 Grime Street	Kano	Bigger Picture	
18 October	The Best Of: 1996 - 2008	Chicane	Modena	
25 October	Nick Warren - Lima	Various Artists	Global Underground	
1 November	Hed Kandi - Disco Heaven	Various Artists	Hed Kandi	
8 November	The Best Of	Sash!	Hard2Beat	
15 November	The Annual 2009	Various Artists	Ministry of Sound	
22 November	The Best Of	Sash!	Hard2Beat	
29 November	The Best Of	Sash!	Hard2Beat	
6 December	The Best Of	Sash!	Hard2Beat	
13 December	Clubland 14	Various Artists	AATW/UMTV	
20 December	The Best Of	Sash!	Hard2Beat	
27 December	Anthems 2 - 1991-2009	Various Artists	Ministry of Sound	

== Notes ==
On Issue date 27 September and 4 October The Coral was listed as number one with the album Singles Collection even through they are of an indie rock genre not even close to electronic.

== See also ==
- List of number-one albums of 2008 (UK)
- List of UK Dance Chart number-one singles of 2008
- List of UK R&B Chart number-one albums of 2008
