= Distance Inbetween =

Studio album by The Coral
- Released: 4 March 2016
- Recorded: 2015
- Studio: Parr Street, Liverpool
- Genre: Psychedelic rock
- Length: 44:38
- Label: Ignition
- Producer: Richard Turvey, The Coral

The Coral chronology
The Curse of Love (2014)	Distance Inbetween (2016)	Move Through the Dawn (2018)

Singles from Distance Inbetween
- 1. "Chasing the Tail of a Dream" Released: 26 December 2015; 2. "Miss Fortune" Released: 20 January 2016; 3. "Holy Revelation" Released: 2016

Distance Inbetween is the eighth studio album by the English indie rock band The Coral. It's their first album after a five-year hiatus, their first without guitarist Lee Southall and also the first with Southall's replacement, Paul Molloy. The album was released on 4 March 2016. The first single, "Chasing the Tail of a Dream", was released on 26 December 2015.

== Background ==
The catalyst for the album and the band's return from hiatus was in 2014 when lead singer and main songwriter James Skelly came up with "Chasing the Tail of a Dream," intending to record it with The Intenders, the backing band for his 2013 debut solo album, Love Undercover which also included The Coral members Ian Skelly, Paul Duffy and Nick Power. When jamming together on the song didn't feel right, Skelly felt it might be more suited to The Coral. Meanwhile, while planning to finally release The Curse of Love, a long-shelved album that they had recorded in between 2005's The Invisible Invasion and 2007's Roots & Echoes, the suggestion came for the band to try making music together again.

Initial songwriting sessions for the album were conducted as a four-piece due to Southall opting out in favor of working on his in-progress solo album, prompting the music to become more rhythm-oriented due to James Skelly being the sole guitarist at the time. After coming up with four new songs, the band brought in Molloy, former guitarist of The Zutons who had recently collaborated with Ian Skelly as Serpent Power.

== Recording ==
The band recorded the album at Liverpool's Parr Street Studios with co-producer Richard Turvey in 2015. The band took a disciplined approach to recording, in which they would arrive at the studio in the morning, work until 10 pm and then go home. Most of the album was recorded live, with overdubs kept to a minimum and the first take (of usually three) often being the chosen one. In total, recording took approximately three weeks, followed a lengthier process of piecing the tracks together.

== Composition ==
Regarding the album's direction, the band wanted the sound to be minimal, direct and groove-based, with musical touchstones including Cypress Hill, Kool Keith, Portishead and Can. The album was also influenced by what Power referred to as "stuff that's happened," including the death of Alan Wills, the band's mentor and founder of Deltasonic Records, in a cycling accident. The band subsequently dedicated the album in memory of Wills.

== Promotion ==
The first single from the album, "Chasing the Tail of a Dream", was released as a free download from the band's website on 26 December 2015. A signed and numbered 7-inch vinyl with the new song "Unforgiven" as the B-side was additionally released. The second single from the album, "Miss Fortune", was released on 20 January 2016, alongside a video produced by the band.

== Reception ==
Professional ratings
Aggregate scores
Source	Rating
AnyDecentMusic?	7.7/10
Metacritic	81/100
Review scores
Source	Rating
AllMusic	4.5/5 stars
Clash	7/10
Classic Rock	3.5/5 stars
Drowned in Sound	7/10
The Guardian	4/5 stars
The Line of Best Fit	6.5/10
musicOMH	3.5/5 stars
NME	4/5 stars
PopMatters	9/10 stars
Under the Radar	8/10 stars

Distance Inbetween was met with generally favourable reviews from music critics. At Metacritic, which assigns a normalized rating out of 100 to reviews from mainstream publications, the album received an average score of 81, based on 18 reviews. AnyDecentMusic? gave it a score of 7.7, also based on 18 reviews.

=== Accolades ===
Publication	Accolade	Year	Rank
Rough Trade	Albums of the Year	2016	92

== Track listing ==
All tracks written by James Skelly, except where noted.

No.	Title	Writer(s)	Length
1.	"Connector"	J. Skelly, Nick Power	4:13
2.	"White Bird"	J. Skelly, Ian Skelly, Power	3:30
3.	"Chasing the Tail of a Dream"		3:44
4.	"Distance Inbetween"		4:19
5.	"Million Eyes"		5:35
6.	"Miss Fortune"	J. Skelly, Power	3:32
7.	"Beyond the Sun"		4:00
8.	"It's You"	J. Skelly, Power	3:28
9.	"Holy Revelation"	J. Skelly, Power	3:10
10.	"She Runs the River"		3:16
11.	"Fear Machine"		4:00
12.	"End Credits"	Power	1:51
Total length:			44:38

== Personnel ==
Credits adapted from Distance Inbetween liner notes.

The Coral

- James Skelly - lead vocals, guitar
- Ian Skelly - drums, percussion, backing vocals
- Nick Power - keyboards, backing vocals
- Paul Duffy - bass guitar, keyboards, backing vocals
- Paul Molloy - guitar

Additional musicians

- Alfie Skelly - bow (track 10)
- Richard Turvey - keyboard (track 9), guitar (track 11)

Production

- Richard Turvey - production, mixing, engineering
- Ian Skelly - additional engineering (track 10), artwork, additional photography
- Anna Benson - artwork
- Dominic Foster - additional photography
- Mike Snowdon - design, layout

== Charts ==
Chart (2016)	Peak position
Belgian Albums (Ultratop Flanders)	142
Belgian Albums (Ultratop Wallonia)	69
Irish Albums (IRMA)	82
UK Albums (OCC)	13
