= Summer Madness =

Summer Madness may refer to:

- "Summer Madness" (instrumental), a 1974 instrumental tune by Kool & the Gang
- "Summer Madness" (Lead song), 2006
- Summer Madness (festival), a Christian festival in Northern Ireland
- the UK release title of the 1955 Katharine Hepburn film Summertime
- Angry Birds: Summer Madness, an animated television series
