= The Mountaineers (band) =

Welsh rock band

Mountaineers
- Origin: Hope, Wales
- Genres: Indie rock Psychedelic rock
- Years active: 2001–2005
- Labels: Deltasonic
- Members: Alex Germains; Ceri James; Tomas Kelar

Mountaineers is a Welsh pop group, consisting of founding members Alex Germains (vocals and guitar), Ceri James (vocals and keyboard), and Tomas Kelar (drums and vocals). Having been discovered by Deltasonic founder Alan Wills, they were the first act to sign to the record label Deltasonic, home of Liverpudlian bands The Coral and The Zutons. The group produced all their own music.

The original line-up released an eponymous 6-track EP (later dubbed the Red Thong EP after the opening track) on the Deltasonic imprint in 2001. This was picked up by BBC Radio 1 disc jockey Mark Radcliffe who played Red Thong (the track) on his national daytime show for a week in the November of that year. Mute Records signed the band and they released another eponymous 6-track EP (known as the Self Catering EP; again after the title of the opening track) in 2003, followed by the album Messy Century in the September. After having been released by Mute due to the label's restructuring in the wake of their takeover by EMI, Kelar left the band. They recruited a new drummer, Ezra Bang, and released a 10" limited-edition EP on the Manchester-based label Northern Ambition in February 2004. Entitled Motions of Interplanetary Dust, it was said by the band to be named after Brian May of Queen's PhD astronomy thesis, and was again well received, with several good reviews but received little radio airplay. Since that release, the band have been on hiatus. However, there are rumours of new material being recorded, but with no substantiation in the media.

== Discography ==
- 26 November 2001 – Red Thong EP
- 25 February 2003 – Self Catering EP
- 15 September 2003 – Ripen (single)
- 29 September 2003 – Messy Century LP
- 22 March 2004 – I Gotta Sing (single)
- 14 February 2005 – Motions of Interplanetary Dust 10"-only EP
