= The Curse of Love =

Studio album by the Coral
- Released: 20 October 2014
- Recorded: 2005–2007
- Length: 39:54
- Label: Skeleton Key

The Coral chronology
Butterfly House (2010)	The Curse of Love (2014)	Distance Inbetween (2016)

The Curse of Love is the seventh studio album by English rock band the Coral. The album features 12 previously unreleased tracks that were recorded on an 8-track recorder between their albums The Invisible Invasion (2005) and Roots & Echoes (2007). The album was released on 20 October 2014.

== Composition ==
Musically, the sound of The Curse of Love has been described as folk and psychedelia, influenced by the work of Echo & the Bunnymen, the Doors and Love. The artwork was reminiscent of In the Land of Grey and Pink (1971) by Caravan. AllMusic reviewer Tim Sendra wrote that apart from "The Golden Bough", which was the only upbeat song on the album, it was otherwise full of "moody, understated ballads and cinematic instrumentals". Musikexpress's Thomas Weiland noted that it sounded "even more psychedelic" than their previous works as Skelly "devoutly reports on British history and nature".

The Curse of Love is bookended by two instrumentals, "The Curse of Love, Pt. 1" and "The Curse of Love, Pt. 2"; the first part borders on spoken word with a psychedelic folk backing, while the second part is done in the style of flamenco. "Wrapped in Blue" and "You Closed the Door" both featured prominent synth parts that are heard throughout their lengths, which are then followed by the instrumental "The Second Self". "The Watcher in the Distance" evoked the sound of the Doors, while "Gently" was compared to the work of John Lennon with its electric guitar and piano instrumentation.

== Release and reception ==
The Coral went on a break in 2013, with the members focusing on solo projects. Following a BBC Radio 6 premiere for "Wrapped in Blue" in August 2014, The Curse of Love was planned for release later in the year. It eventually came out on the band's label Skeleton Key Records on 20 October 2014. An animated video, done by Dominic Foster, was released on YouTube on 5 November 2014.

Professional ratings
Aggregate scores
Source	Rating
AnyDecentMusic?	7.1/10
Metacritic	80/100
Review scores
Source	Rating
AllMusic	4/5 stars
The Line of Best Fit	4/10
Musikexpress	4/6 stars
NME	4/5 stars
Xs Noize	5/10

The Curse of Love was met with generally favourable reviews from music critics. At Metacritic, which assigns a normalized rating out of 100 to reviews from mainstream publications, the album received an average score of 80, based on five reviews. AnyDecentMusic? gave it a score of 7.1, based on seven reviews.

Sendra was perplexed that it remained shelved for as long as it did, as it "works perfectly as a follow-up to The Invisible Invasion, further stripping down their sound to the bare essentials and really allowing the songs to breath". Weiland wrote that as they were not under "pressure of having to deliver a hit, everything just flows together, completely undisturbed". Gigslutz writer Katie Muxworthy said it had an "undeniable consistency through-out", though showcases a band that are "entirely focused on depicting a moodier, mature feeling".

NME writer Matthew Horton saw it as a "neat record, filled with the mystic folk and lithe psychedelia that made them so refreshing back in the day". Daniel Jeakins of The Line of Best Fit, meanwhile, found it to be an "oddly bipolar record that can’t seem to decide whether love is indeed a curse or a blessing", and mentioning that it was "justifiably scrapped" in light of Roots & Echoes. Xs Noize's Stewart Gibson wrote that, with its unique status in mind, it "sort of works [as a whole] but ends up sounding like a cut price Coral album treading familiar ground".

== Track listing ==
All songs written by James Skelly, except where noted.

No.	Title	Writer(s)	Length
1.	"The Curse of Love, Pt. 1"		3:14
2.	"Wrapped in Blue"		3:08
3.	"You Closed the Door"		3:51
4.	"The Second Self"		2:32
5.	"View From the Mirror"		3:29
6.	"The Watcher in the Distance"		4:50
7.	"Gently"		3:11
8.	"Willow Song"	J. Skelly, Lee Southall	3:22
9.	"The Golden Bough"		3:29
10.	"The Game"		3:09
11.	"Nine Times the Colour Red"		2:51
12.	"The Curse of Love, Pt. 2"		2:48
Total length:			39:54

== Personnel ==
Credits adapted from The Curse of Love liner notes.

The Coral

- James Skelly – vocals, acoustic guitar, electric guitar (track 10)
- Ian Skelly – drums
- Paul Duffy – bass guitar, vocals
- Lee Southall – acoustic guitar, electric guitar, vocals
- Nick Power – keyboards

Additional musicians

- David McDonnell – bow (tracks 1, 4 and 12), backwards guitar (track 2), wah guitar (track 3), slide guitar (track 8)
- Bill Ryder-Jones – lead guitar (tracks 5–7), acoustic guitar (track 10), bow (track 11)

Production

- Ian Skelly – engineering, artwork
- David McDonnell – engineering
- Anna Benson – artwork
- Mike Snowdon – design
