= Love Undercover =

Love Undercover may refer to:

- Love Undercover (film), a 2002 Hong Kong film
- Love Undercover (album), a 2013 album by James Skelly & The Intenders
