= List of compact discs sold with Extended Copy Protection =

The following compact discs, sold by Sony BMG, were shipped with the computer software known as Extended Copy Protection (XCP). As a result, any Microsoft Windows computer that has been used to play these CDs is likely to have had XCP installed. This can cause a number of serious security problems. Several security software vendors, including Microsoft, regard XCP as a trojan horse, spyware, or rootkit. MacOS systems that were used to play these CDs may have been affected with a similar program, MediaMax.

== Album list ==
Title	Artist	Item Number(s)	UPC(s)	Record Club Number
12 Songs	Neil Diamond	CK94776; CK97811	827969477625; 827969781128	—
At This Time	Burt Bacharach	CK97734	827969773420	—
The Best of Shel Silverstein	Shel Silverstein	CK94722	827969472224	D162100
Bob Brookmeyer & Friends	Bob Brookmeyer	CK94292	827969429228	D162087
The Body Acoustic	Cyndi Lauper	EK94569	827969456927	—
Broken Valley	Life of Agony	EK93515	827969351529	D161228
Cautivo	Chayanne	LAK96819; LAK96818; LAK95886	037629681921; 037629681822; 037629588626	—
Complicated	Nivea	82876671562	828766715620	D161353
The Dead 60s	The Dead 60s	EK94453	827969445327	—
Dreamin' My Dreams	Patty Loveless	EK94481	827969448120	—
Drum Suite	Art Blakey	CK93637	827969363720	D162083
The Essential Dion	Dion	CK92670	827969267028	D161439
The Essential Pete Seeger	Pete Seeger	CK92835	827969283523	D161441
Faso Latido	A Static Lullaby	CK92772	827969277225	D161263
Foggy Mountain Jamboree	Flatt & Scruggs	CK92801	827969280126	D162400
Friendship	Ray Charles	CK94564	827969456422	D161917
Get Right with the Man	Van Zant	CK93500	827969350027	D161459
Golden	Elkland	CK92036	827969203620	D161431
Great American Songbook	Billie Holiday	CK94294	827969429426	—
Great American Songbook	Frank Sinatra	CK94291	827969429129	—
Great American Songbook	Louis Armstrong	CK94295	827969429525	—
Healthy in Paranoid Times	Our Lady Peace	CK94777	827969477724	—
I Saw the Light With Some Help from My Friends	Earl Scruggs	CK92793	827969279328	D162399
Interiors	Rosanne Cash	CK93655	827969365526	—
The Invisible Invasion	The Coral	CK94747	827969474723	—
Jeru	Gerry Mulligan	CK65498	074646549827	D162086
King's Record Shop	Rosanne Cash	CK86994	696998699427	—
G3: Live in Tokyo	G3	E2K97685	827969768525	—
Manhattan Symphonie	Dexter Gordon	CK93581	827969358122	D162084
Mary Mary	Mary Mary	CK94812; CK92948	000768353721; 827969294826	D162005
My Very Special Guests	George Jones	E2K92562	827969256220	D200250
Nothing Is Sound	Switchfoot	CK96534; CK96437; CK94581	827969653425; 827969643723; 827969458129	—
On ne change pas	Celine Dion	E2K97736	827969773628	—
Phantoms	Acceptance	CK89016	696998901629	D161429
Ride	Shelly Fairchild	CK90355	827969035528	D161531
Robbery	Teena Marie	EK93817	827969381724	—
The Season	Jane Monheit	EK97721	827969772126	—
Seven Year Ache	Rosanne Cash	CK86997	696998699724	—
Shine	Trey Anastasio	CK96428	827969642825	—
Silver's Blue	Horace Silver Quintet	CK93856	827969385623	D162082
Bette Midler Sings the Peggy Lee Songbook	Bette Midler	CK95107; CK74815	827969510728; 828767481524	—
Something to Be Proud Of: The Best of 1999–2005	Montgomery Gentry	CK75324; CK94982	828767532424; 827969498224	—
Susie Suh	Susie Suh	EK92443	827969244326	D161094
Suspicious Activity?	The Bad Plus	CK94740	827969474020	—
This Is Niecy	Deniece Williams	CK93814	827969381427	—
Times Like These	Buddy Jewell	CK92873	827969287323	D161532
To Love Again: The Duets	Chris Botti	CK94823	827969482322	—
Touch	Amerie	CK90763	827969076323	D161365
Unfabulous and More	Emma Roberts	CK93950; CK97684	827969395028; 827969768426	—
Unwritten	Natasha Bedingfield	EK93988	827969398821	D162095
Vivian	Vivian Green	CK90761	827969076125	D161824
Walking Among the Living	Jon Randall	EK92083	827969208328	—

Note: Three titles — Ricky Martin, "Life"; Peter Gallagher, "7 Days in Memphis"; and a limited number of “Hidden Beach Presents Unwrapped Vol. 4” — were released with a content protection grid on the back of the CD packaging but XCP content protection software was not actually included on the albums.
