= List of UK Independent Albums Chart number ones of 2008 =

These are the Official Charts Company's UK Indie Chart number-one albums of 2008.

== Chart history ==
Issue date	Album	Artist(s)	Record label	Ref.
6 January	In Rainbows	Radiohead	XL	
13 January	In Rainbows	Radiohead	XL	
20 January	In Rainbows	Radiohead	XL	
27 January	In Rainbows	Radiohead	XL	
3 February	19	Adele	XL	
10 February	19	Adele	XL	
17 February	19	Adele	XL	
24 February	19	Adele	XL	
2 March	19	Adele	XL	
9 March	19	Adele	XL	
16 March	Midnight Boom	The Kills	Domino	
23 March	19	Adele	XL	
30 March	Consolers of the Lonely	The Raconteurs	XL	
6 April	Consolers of the Lonely	The Raconteurs	XL	
13 April	Consolers of the Lonely	The Raconteurs	XL	
20 April	Consolers of the Lonely	The Raconteurs	XL	
27 April	The Age of the Understatement	The Last Shadow Puppets	Domino	
4 May	The Age of the Understatement	The Last Shadow Puppets	Domino	
11 May	The Age of the Understatement	The Last Shadow Puppets	Domino	
18 May	Angles	Dan Le Sac vs Scroobius Pip	Sunday Best	
25 May	Hold Your Colour	Pendulum	Breakbeat Kaos	
1 June	Emergency	The Pigeon Detectives	Dance to the Radio	
8 June	Emergency	The Pigeon Detectives	Dance to the Radio	
15 June	To Survive	Joan as Police Woman	Reveal	
22 June	Fleet Foxes	Fleet Foxes	Bella Union	
29 June	Fleet Foxes	Fleet Foxes	Bella Union	
6 July	Vampire Weekend	Vampire Weekend	XL	
13 July	Modern Guilt	Beck	XL	
20 July	Stay Positive	The Hold Steady	Rough Trade	
27 July	The Age of the Understatement	The Last Shadow Puppets	Domino	
3 August	The Slip	Nine Inch Nails	The Null Corporation	
10 August	Hold Your Colour	Pendulum	Breakbeat Kaos	
17 August	Hold Your Colour	Pendulum	Breakbeat Kaos	
24 August	Journey to the West	Monkey	XL	
31 August	Somewhere	Eva Cassidy	Blix Street	
7 September	Slime & Reason	Roots Manuva	Big Dada	
14 September	The Age of the Understatement	The Last Shadow Puppets	Domino	
21 September	Stop the Clocks	Oasis	Big Brother	
28 September	Stop the Clocks	Oasis	Big Brother	
5 October	Stop the Clocks	Oasis	Big Brother	
12 October	Dig Out Your Soul	Oasis	Big Brother	
19 October	Dig Out Your Soul	Oasis	Big Brother	
26 October	Dig Out Your Soul	Oasis	Big Brother	
2 November	Dig Out Your Soul	Oasis	Big Brother	
9 November	Dig Out Your Soul	Oasis	Big Brother	
16 November	Dig Out Your Soul	Oasis	Big Brother	
23 November	Dig Out Your Soul	Oasis	Big Brother	
30 November	Dig Out Your Soul	Oasis	Big Brother	
7 December	Dig Out Your Soul	Oasis	Big Brother	
14 December	Dig Out Your Soul	Oasis	Big Brother	
21 December	Dig Out Your Soul	Oasis	Big Brother	
28 December	Dig Out Your Soul	Oasis	Big Brother	

== See also ==
- List of number-one albums of 2008 (UK)
- List of UK Dance Albums Chart number ones of 2008
- List of UK Independent Singles Chart number ones of 2008
- List of UK Rock Chart number-one albums of 2008
- List of UK R&B Albums Chart number ones of 2008
