= Nightfreak and the Sons of Becker =

Studio album by the Coral
- Released: 26 January 2004
- Recorded: September 2003
- Studio: Bryn Derwen, Wales
- Genre: Neo-psychedelia
- Length: 27:59
- Label: Deltasonic
- Producer: Ian Broudie; the Coral

The Coral chronology
Magic and Medicine (2003)	Nightfreak and the Sons of Becker (2004)	The Invisible Invasion (2005)

Nightfreak and the Sons of Becker is a mini album and third studio album by English rock band the Coral, released on 26 January 2004 by Deltasonic. The Coral began writing the record less than a month after releasing their second studio album, Magic and Medicine (2003). Recording for the album took place over 12 days at Bryn Derwen Studios in Wales with producer Ian Broudie, frontman for the Lightning Seeds; the Coral served as co-producers. Described as a lo-fi neo-psychedelia release, Nightfreak is a concept album about German tennis player Boris Becker.

Nightfreak and the Sons of Becker received generally favourable reviews from music critics, with particular compliments for the songwriting. Comparisons have been made to the work of Captain Beefheart and to the Mwng (2000) era of Super Furry Animals. Commercially, the album reached number four on the Scottish Albums Charts and number five on the UK Albums Chart, while also charting in France, Ireland, and Japan. The album received little promotion and no single releases, as the Coral viewed it as a stop-gap release between Magic and Medicine and their next full-length studio album. Only 75,000 copies of Nightfreak and the Sons of Becker were initially released in the UK.

== Background and recording ==
The Coral released their eponymous debut studio album in July 2002. They quickly followed this with their second effort, Magic and Medicine, in July 2003. Both albums were certified gold by the British Phonographic Industry (BPI). A month after releasing Magic and Medicine, the Coral had begun writing material for a follow-up release.

Recording for Nightfreak and the Sons of Becker took place in September 2003. Sessions were held at Bryn Derwen Studios in Wales, with Ian Broudie of the Lightning Seeds serving as the main producer, and Jon Gray serving as the engineer. Frontman James Skelly referred to Nightfreak as "quite a spontaneous record", having been made over the course of 12 days, with many of the vocal and guitar parts finished in a single take. Some of the tracks were written on the day that they were recorded. Gary Butler mastered the album at RTS Onestop in Prescot, Merseyside.

== Composition and lyrics ==
Nightfreak and the Sons of Becker has been classified as a lo-fi neo-psychedelia album, with comparisons to the work of Captain Beefheart and to the album Mwng (2000) by Super Furry Animals. Guitarist Bill Ryder-Jones described the work as a concept album about German tennis player Boris Becker. In reference to the title, Skelly said that the band were the "illegitimate sons" of Becker, "travelling round the world to get money off him. We're coming back to get the pay-off that we deserve!" Writing credits were split among different members of the Coral.

The album opens with "Precious Eyes", a track reminiscent of Supergrass and the Bees, with 1960s-styled vocal harmonies in the chorus. It is followed by the dance song "Venom Cable", with a funk guitar line and an organ heard during the middle eight. The beginning of "I Forgot My Name" channels songs by the Animals and Them, before shifting in a section similar to the Mothers of Invention. "Song of the Corn" is a folk song, with a changing time signature in the vein of the Beta Band. "Sorrow or the Song", a ballad that transitions from singing to a melody-less mumbling, is followed by "Auntie's Operation", a Kinks-indebted number with cowbell and slide guitar. "Why Does the Sun Come Up?" acts as an interlude, consisting of snippets that the band recorded from cable television while they were on tour in the US. "Grey Harpoon" is a G-funk song with influences of Snoop Dogg, and is followed by the post-punk track "Keep Me Company". The album closes with "Lover's Paradise", a homage to music hall that has drawn comparisons to the Beatles.

== Release ==
The Coral announced Nightfreak and the Sons of Becker on 12 November 2003, with an intended release in early 2004. That same month, the band embarked on a UK tour that lasted into December. Two performances had to be canceled when Skelly lost his voice. Nightfreak and the Sons of Becker was released in the UK on 26 January 2004, via Deltasonic. A limited release, only 75,000 copies were pressed.

Nightfreak and the Sons of Becker is a mini album, intended by the band to serve as a stop-gap release before their next studio album. As a result, no singles were released, and the album received minimal promotion. Ryder-Jones told reporters that the band did not want audiences to view Nightfreak as "a big third album [...] It's like a mini-album that we just sort of rushed into, and it [...] looks smaller, doesn't it? It looks like less of a deal." On 10 February 2004, the album was released in the US as a two-CD package alongside Magic and Medicine. The record label Music on CD later reissued the album in 2016.

== Reception ==
Professional ratings
Aggregate scores
Source	Rating
Metacritic	62/100
Review scores
Source	Rating
AllMusic	3.5/5 stars
Entertainment Weekly	B
The Guardian	3/5 stars
NME	7/10
The Observer	3/5 stars
Pitchfork	3.5/10
Tiny Mix Tapes	3.5/5 stars
Uncut	1/5 stars
Yahoo! Launch	8/10 stars

Nightfreak and the Sons of Becker was met with generally favourable from music critics. At Metacritic, which assigns a normalized rating out of 100 to reviews from mainstream publications, the album received an average score of 62, based on 12 reviews.

AllMusic reviewer Tim DiGravina praised the quality of the album when contrasted with its short recording process. He wrote that the album was "another eclectic and accomplished patchwork of tantalizing neo-psychedelia" from the band, who crafted "11 songs [that] are mostly potent and exhilarating" rather than demo-sounding "throwaways". He additionally praised the "mixing of old and new" influences through the songs, which made the album "such a compelling listen". In a review for Entertainment Weekly, Greg Kot said the album "restores the rough edges" of the Coral that had dissipated on Magic and Medicine, "but with slighter songs". The Guardian critic Alexis Petridis wrote that "[t]he tunes that powered their biggest hits are noticeable by their absence". With a deeper listen, he wrote that much of the album "appears less like an exercise in deliberately alienating the Coral's audience than a counterpoint to their second album", where "no idea has been rejected as too obtuse for release".

Ruth Jamieson of The Observer called the album a "light hearted lo-fi bundle of joy", full of "chirpy riffs, chugging bass, and vaguely psychedelic warblings". NME's Paul Moody saw the album as "a low-key classic from a group grappling with the demands of fame" as they "reject the commercial gloss which made 'Magic And Medicine' [popular ...] and return to the darker grog of their debut". musicOMH contributor John Murphy noted that, while the album did not contain "anything here to stand alongside 'Dreaming Of You' or 'Pass It On'", there were enough "psychedelic-tinged jams to keep Coral fans happy". He pondered if "we shouldn't expect too much of Nightfreaks" given its status of a stop-gap release. A guest writer of Tiny Mix Tapes wrote that the band "tend to refer to many musical styles" across their albums, which was an "approach [that] works again on this record". They added that it "boils with energy, excitement, and a passion to experiment", though a song such as "Keep Me Company" "may not be in line with the overall tone of the album".

Adam Corrigan of Bangor Daily News said that Nightfreak was "much less accessible" than its predecessor, Magic and Medicine, and that it was "either an energetic outburst of creativity or an attempt to upset the legions drawn to their more crafted work". Toledo Blade's Richard Paton wrote that the mini-LP's runtime was "long enough, because at times [it] sounds like a bad musical flashback". Billboard writer Susanne Ault referred to the album as "experimentation for experimentation's sake [...] wherein special effects drown out too many of the harmonies". Pitchfork contributor Neil Robertson called Nightfreak "a flatulent, irrelevant, self-indulgent attempt at recapturing the hotwired spontaneity of their debut through a dirge of sub-par psychedelia and try-hard freakouts". The staff at Uncut were equally critical, saying that, "generally the sense is still of a bunch of tasteful influences [...] and some well chosen chords failing to coalesce into something with real emotional weight".

Nightfreak and the Sons of Becker peaked at number four on the Scottish Albums Charts, and at number five on the UK Albums Chart. Elsewhere, the album reached number 35 in Ireland, number 59 in France, and number 68 in Japan.

== Track listing ==
Writing credits per booklet. All recordings produced by Ian Broudie and the Coral.

No.	Title	Writer(s)	Length
1.	"Precious Eyes"	James Skelly	2:58
2.	"Venom Cable"	The Coral	2:33
3.	"I Forgot My Name"	The Coral	2:45
4.	"Song of the Corn"	Nick Power	3:10
5.	"Sorrow or the Song"	J. Skelly; Power	3:15
6.	"Auntie's Operation"	J. Skelly; Lee Southall; Power	2:23
7.	"Why Does the Sun Come Up?"	The Coral	0:38
8.	"Grey Harpoon"	J. Skelly; Power	2:20
9.	"Keep Me Company"	J. Skelly	3:28
10.	"Migraine"	J. Skelly	2:45
11.	"Lover's Paradise"	J. Skelly; Power	1:44
Total length:			27:59

== Personnel ==
Credits taken from Nightfreak and the Sons of Becker album liner notes.

The Coral

- James Skelly – vocals, guitar
- Lee Southall – guitar
- Bill Ryder-Jones – guitar
- Paul Duffy – bass guitar
- Nick Power – keyboards
- Ian Skelly – drums

Production and design

- Ian Broudie – producer
- The Coral – co-producer
- Jon Gray – engineer
- Gary Butler – mastering
- Ian Skelly – sleeve illustrations
- Kevin Power – photography, design
- Juno – design

== Charts ==
Chart performance for Nightfreak and the Sons of Becker
Chart (2004)	Peak position
French Albums (SNEP)	59
Irish Albums (IRMA)	35
Japan (Oricon)	68
Scottish Albums (OCC)	4
UK Albums (OCC)	5
UK Rock & Metal Albums (OCC)	1
