= In the Morning (The Coral song) =

2005 single by the Coral

Single by the Coral

from the album The Invisible Invasion
- Released: 9 May 2005
- Length: 2:33
- Label: Deltasonic
- Songwriter: James Skelly
- Producers: Geoff Barrow, Adrian Utley

The Coral singles chronology
"Bill McCai" (2003)	"In the Morning" (2005)	"Something Inside of Me" (2005)

"In the Morning" is a song by English indie rock band the Coral. It was released on 9 May 2005 as the lead single from their third studio album The Invisible Invasion (2005). The single reached number six on the UK Singles Chart. It was the second-most-played song on UK radio in 2005.

All songs on the single release (except where noted) were recorded at Monnow Valley Studio, mixed at Moles Studio in Bath by Geoff Barrow, Adrian Utley and Craig Silvey and engineered by Adrian Utley and Steve Davis. Nick Joplin was the assistant mix engineer, and the songs were mastered at Whitfield Street Studios in Central London by Frank Arkwright. Art design was by K. Power.

The music video was directed by Goodtimes.

In June 2014, the song featured in an advert for Tesco.

== Track listings ==
CDM

1. "In the Morning" – 2:33 (J. Skelly)
2. "Gina Jones" – 3:30 (J. Skelly)
3. "The Image of Richard Burton as Crom" – 4:02 (the Coral)
4. *Mixed at Adrian Utley's house, Assistant mix engineer: Stuart Matthews, Additional production at Elevator Studios, Liverpool by Matthew Edge
5. In the Morning (video)
6. *Directed by Goodtimes

CD2 Tracker

1. "In the Morning" – 2:33 (J. Skelly)
2. "Leeslunchboxbyblueleadandthevelcrounderpants" – 2:56 (Bobby Zeus and the Youngbloods)

7-inch

1. "In the Morning" – 2:33 (J. Skelly)
2. "Gina Jones" – 3:30 (J. Skelly)

== Charts ==
=== Weekly charts ===
Chart (2005)	Peak position
Ireland (IRMA)	28
Poland (LP3)	45
Scotland Singles (OCC)	5
UK Singles (OCC)	6
Ukraine Airplay (TopHit)	154

=== Year-end charts ===
Chart (2005)	Position
UK Singles (OCC)	87

== Certifications ==
Region	Certification	Certified units/sales
United Kingdom (BPI)	Gold	400,000^{‡}
^{‡} Sales+streaming figures based on certification alone.
