= Love Undercover (album) =

Studio album by James Skelly & The Intenders
- Released: 3 June 2013
- Recorded: August 2012; Parr Street Studios (Liverpool, England)
- Genre: Soul, R&B, indie rock, indie folk, folk rock, blues rock, pop rock
- Length: 40:35
- Label: Skeleton Key, Cooking Vinyl
- Producer: James Skelly, Ian Skelly

Singles from Love Undercover
- 1. "Do It Again" Released: 25 March 2013; 2. "You've Got It All" Released: 6 May 2013

Love Undercover is the debut studio album by English rock group James Skelly & The Intenders. It was released on 3 June 2013, on Skeleton Key Records and Cooking Vinyl and reached No. 85 on the UK Albums Chart.

During a hiatus from his band The Coral, Skelly recorded a soul and R&B-influenced album in 2012, produced by himself and Ian Skelly. Rather than being a solo album, numerous musicians contributed to the recording of Love Undercover, including bandmates from The Coral and members of Tramp Attack and The Sundowners, which lead the group being known as James Skelly & The Intenders.

== Background ==
Prior to making Love Undercover, Skelly's band The Coral had commenced work on their sixth studio album, the follow-up to Butterfly House (2010), with producer John Leckie at Real World Studios in March 2012. However, this session ended with only half an album completed and subsequently, The Coral entered into an indefinite hiatus with members pursuing their own solo projects.

"The stuff we’d recorded was great, but it was just natural ... We’d been together since we were 16, younger even, and you just get to the point where you’re almost trapped in this version of what you think you should be."

— James Skelly, Liverpool Daily Post

== Recording ==
Following a recommendation from Alan Wills, the head of Deltasonic, Skelly contacted Rich Turvey, the engineer at Parr Street Studios, Liverpool, and arranged a free trial at the studio which resulted in him using the facility to record the whole album.

Sessions took place in August 2012, produced by James Skelly and Ian Skelly, and the basic tracks were recorded live. James Skelly performs lead vocals and guitar on the album and his backing band was assembled from The Coral bandmates – Ian Skelly on drums, Paul Duffy on guitar, Nick Power on piano, ex-Tramp Attack member James Redmond on bass guitar, and members of The Sundowners – Niamh Rowe and Fiona Skelly on backing vocals and Alfie Skelly on guitar.

The process of recording the album as a group lead to Skelly choosing the name James Skelly & The Intenders for the project.

"The name is just about letting people know that it’s not just me and an acoustic guitar – which I’d imagine they might think it would be ... I had the songs, but it became a proper group thing, with everyone involved having a big input into it ... I wanted a Bruce Springsteen & The E-Street Band, Tom Petty & The Heartbreakers thing, so that people get the idea that that’s what it is live. And I just thought it sounded good. It sounds like the sort of thing you’d want to go and see."

— James Skelly, Liverpool Daily Post

== Musical style and composition ==
During the making of Love Undercover, Skelly "was listening to a lot of soul and R&B" which strongly influences the sound of album. Specific influences include Stax Records, Motown, John Lee Hooker, Muddy Waters, Tom Petty and the Heartbreakers and Bob Marley and the Wailers.

Skelly has said that for this album "[the lyrics] are all conversations", whilst the album's title is due to "all of the songs are sort of about all of the different disguises love comes in". "You've Got It All" came from an unfinished demo by Paul Weller which he'd sent to Skelly to finish. Skelly wrote lyrics to Weller's melody and chords and having previously demoed the song at Weller's studio, recorded the song for Love Undercover. "What a Day" was written by James Skelly and Ian Skelly fifteen years prior to the release of the album and Skelly had an unfinished version of "Searching for the Sun" written with The Coral during the earlier John Leckie sessions.

== Release and promotion ==
Love Undercover was released on CD, LP and digital download formats on 3 June 2013 by Skeleton Key Records under license to Cooking Vinyl. The iTunes edition contained "I Can't Help You Now" as a bonus track.

Two songs from the album were released as digital download singles. "Do It Again" was released as a free download via the James Skelly & The Intenders official website on 11 March 2013 and was also released to online stores on 25 March 2013. A music video for "You've Got It All" aired on 26 April 2013 and the single was released on 6 May 2013 backed with "Love Will Find You" as the b-side.

The album was available to stream online in full on the NME website on 24 May 2013. James Skelly and Paul Duffy recorded an acoustic session on BBC Radio Merseyside on 1 June 2013 and also performed two in store acoustic sets at HMV in Liverpool and Manchester on 2 and 3 June 2013 respectively.

== Critical reception ==
The album received mainly mediocre reviews from music critics.

Professional ratings
Aggregate scores
Source	Rating
Metacritic	64/100
Review scores
Source	Rating
Uncut	3.5/5 stars
The Independent	3/5 stars
MusicOMH	3/5 stars
Q Magazine	3/5 stars
Mojo	3/5 stars
Record Collector	2/5 stars

== Track listing ==
All tracks are written by James Skelly, except where noted

No.	Title	Length
1.	"You've Got It All" (Paul Weller, James Skelly)	3:13
2.	"Do It Again"	3:21
3.	"Here for You"	3:26
4.	"Sacrifice"	3:15
5.	"Searching for the Sun"	3:14
6.	"You and I"	4:28
7.	"Set You Free"	4:05
8.	"Turn Away"	3:02
9.	"What a Day" (James Skelly, Ian Skelly)	3:10
10.	"I'm a Man"	3:06
11.	"Darkest Days"	6:15
Total length:		40:35

iTunes bonus track
No.	Title	Length
12.	"I Can't Help You Now"	3:21

== Chart performance ==
Chart (2013)	Peak position
UK Albums (OCC)	85

== Release history ==
Region	Date	Label	Format	Catalog
Worldwide release	31 May 2013	Skeleton Key Records, Cooking Vinyl	Digital download	
United Kingdom	3 June 2013	Skeleton Key Records, Cooking Vinyl	CD	COOKCD589
United Kingdom	3 June 2013	Skeleton Key Records, Cooking Vinyl	LP	SKLP003
