= Butterfly House (album) =

Studio album by The Coral
- Released: 12 July 2010
- Recorded: 2008–2010
- Studio: RAK, London; Rockfield, Monmouth
- Genre: Indie rock, indie pop, neo-psychedelia
- Length: 42:29
- Label: Deltasonic
- Producer: John Leckie

The Coral chronology
Roots & Echoes (2007)	Butterfly House (2010)	The Curse of Love (2014)

Singles from Butterfly House
- 1. "1000 Years" Released: 5 July 2010; 2. "More Than a Lover" Released: 6 September 2010; 3. "Walking in the Winter" Released: 22 November 2010; 4. "Two Faces" Released: 7 March 2011

Butterfly House is the sixth full-length studio album by English indie rock band The Coral. The album was produced by John Leckie, whose previous collaborators include The Stone Roses and Radiohead. and was recorded at RAK studios in London as well as Rockfield in South Wales. It was released on 12 July 2010 to great critical acclaim. The album was recorded through a two-year span where the band road-tested the material. This is The Coral's first album without Bill Ryder-Jones, who departed in 2008. It peaked at #16 in the UK Album Charts but has since been a consistent seller for Deltasonic Records. The single, "1000 Years", reached #188 on the UK Singles Chart.

== Background ==
The Coral released their fifth studio album Roots & Echoes in August 2007, reaching number eight in the UK Albums Chart. Out of its three singles, "Who's Gonna Find Me" charted the highest, reaching number 25 in the UK. They promoted the album with a tour of the United Kingdom two months later; by January 2008, guitarist Bill Ryder-Jones left the band, citing panic attacks. XFM reported that they had demoed material for their next album, which they were expecting to release later that year. Frontman James Skelly said they wanted to produce the album themselves and record it in April 2008. Following this, they rented small houses in locations such as the Lake District and Wales to write more material.

In January 2010, NME reported that the band had been working on their next album with producer John Leckie.

== Release ==
On 6 April 2010, Butterfly House was announced for release in three months' time. On 11 May 2010, "Butterfly House" was made available as a free download through the band's website. "1000 Years" was released was the album's lead single on 5 July 2010. They appeared at the T in the Park festival, where they debuted "Roving Jewel", "Two Faces", "She's Comin' Around" and "1000 Years". Butterfly House was released on 12 July 2010. It was promoted with a short, five-date UK tour. Shortly afterwards, the band headlined Kendal Calling and appeared at the Latitude, Summer Madness and V festivals. In November 2010, they embarked on another short UK tour. An acoustic version of the album, recorded and mixed in a single day, was released on 6 December 2010. Skelly explained that after they did some acoustic shows, people were asking if they were going to record the new songs in that style. After playing three warm-up shows, the band appeared as the Glastonbury Festival in June 2011. They then supported the Courteeners for a one-off gig at the Haigh Hall in Wigan at the end of the month. In August 2010, the Coral performed at the Field Day and Cropredy festivals.

== Reception ==
Professional ratings
Aggregate scores
Source	Rating
AnyDecentMusic?	6.7/10
Metacritic	73/100
Review scores
Source	Rating
AllMusic	3.5/5 stars
The Daily Mirror	4/5 stars
Drowned in Sound	6/10 stars
The Guardian	3/5 stars
NME	8/10 stars
Pitchfork	5.8/10
Q	4/5 stars
The Skinny	4/5 stars
Slant Magazine	4/5 stars
Uncut	4/5 stars

Butterfly House was met with generally favourable reviews from music critics. At Metacritic, which assigns a normalized rating out of 100 to reviews from mainstream publications, the album received an average score of 73, based on eight reviews. AnyDecentMusic? gave it a score of 6.7, based on 27 reviews.

== Track listing ==
No.	Title	Writer(s)	Length
1.	"More than a Lover"	James Skelly, Ian Skelly	3:07
2.	"Roving Jewel"	J. Skelly, I. Skelly	3:17
3.	"Walking in the Winter"	J. Skelly, Lee Southall	3:08
4.	"Sandhills"	J. Skelly	3:41
5.	"Butterfly House"	J. Skelly, Nick Power	3:21
6.	"Green Is the Colour"	J. Skelly, Power	3:22
7.	"Falling All Around You"	J. Skelly, Power	3:25
8.	"Two Faces"	J. Skelly	2:38
9.	"She's Comin' Around"	J. Skelly	3:26
10.	"1000 Years"	J. Skelly, I. Skelly, Southall	2:51
11.	"Coney Island"	J. Skelly	3:23
12.	"North Parade"	J. Skelly, Southall, Paul Duffy	6:02
Total length:			42:29

Limited edition bonus disc
No.	Title	Writer(s)	Length
1.	"Into the Sun"	J. Skelly	3:31
2.	"Coming Through the Rye"	J. Skelly, Southall	3:24
3.	"Dream in August"	J. Skelly	4:10
4.	"Another Way"	Southall	3:40
5.	"Circles"	J. Skelly, I. Skelly, Southall, Duffy, Power	5:10

iTunes bonus tracks
No.	Title	Writer(s)	Length
13.	"Into the Sun"	J. Skelly	3:31
14.	"Coming Through the Rye"	J. Skelly, Southall	3:24
15.	"Dream in August"	J. Skelly	4:10
16.	"Another Way"	Southall	3:40
17.	"Circles"	J. Skelly, I. Skelly, Southall, Duffy, Power	5:10
18.	"1000 Years" (acoustic version)	J. Skelly, I. Skelly, Southall	2:53

== Butterfly House Acoustic ==
A stripped-down "acoustic" version of this album (with one extra track and different mixes) was also released on 13 December 2010 but did not chart.

No.	Title	Writer(s)	Length
1.	"More than a Lover"	James Skelly, Ian Skelly	3:18
2.	"Roving Jewel"	J. Skelly, I. Skelly	3:25
3.	"Walking in the Winter"	J. Skelly, Lee Southall	3:22
4.	"Sandhills"	J. Skelly	3:41
5.	"Butterfly House"	J. Skelly, Nick Power	3:19
6.	"Green Is the Colour"	J. Skelly, Power	3:10
7.	"Falling All Around You"	J. Skelly, Power	2:52
8.	"Two Faces"	J. Skelly	2:41
9.	"She's Comin' Around"	J. Skelly	3:26
10.	"1000 Years"	J. Skelly, I. Skelly, Southall	2:52
11.	"Coney Island"	J. Skelly	3:43
12.	"North Parade"	J. Skelly, Southall, Paul Duffy	3:01
13.	"Dreamland"	J. Skelly, I. Skelly	1:26

== Personnel ==
The Coral

- James Skelly – vocals, guitar
- Lee Southall – guitar, backing vocals, lead vocals on "Another Way"
- Paul Duffy – bass guitar, backing vocals
- Nick Power – keyboards, backing vocals
- Ian Skelly – drums, backing vocals, photography

Production

- John Leckie – producer, mixing
- Guy Massey – engineer, mixing
- Dan Austin – engineer
- Richard Woodcroft – engineer
- Darren Jones – assistant engineer
- Helen Atkinson – assistant engineer
- Ollie Buchanan – assistant engineer
- Robbie Nelson – assistant engineer
- Tim Lewis – assistant engineer
- Tom Fuller – assistant engineer
- Sean O'Hagan – arrangements
- Ian Broudie – arrangements
- Robin Schmidt – mastering

Additional musicians

- Scott Marmion – pedal steel
- Shaz – claps

Other personnel

- Michael Snowdon – design
- Alfie Skelly – photography

== Chart performance ==
Chart (2010)	Peak position
France (SNEP)	88
German Albums (Offizielle Top 100)	51
Greek Albums (IFPI)	47
Ireland (Irish Albums Chart)	74
Japan (Oricon)	172
Scottish Albums (Official Charts)	23
UK Albums (Official Charts)	16
UK Album Downloads (Official Charts)	18

== Release history ==
Region	Date	Label	Format	Catalog
United Kingdom	12 July 2010	Deltasonic	CD, 2xCD, LP, digital download, box set	DLTCD086, DLTLP086, DLTBX08
United Kingdom	13 December 2010	Deltasonic	CD, digital download (acoustic edition)	DLTCD091
