= Summer Madness (festival) =

Summer Madness is Ireland's largest Christian festival. It usually takes place over the first weekend in July. Since 2022, the festival site has been adjacent to Portglenone Abbey.

== Origins ==
The festival was commissioned thirty years ago by the Church of Ireland Youth Department.

== Target audience ==
The festival is aimed at young people, and consistently targets those aged 15–25, and also caters for ages 5–11. The festival expects at least 1,700 people camping on site for the duration.

== Amenities and facilities ==
- Seminars
- Debates
- Arts Workshops
- Sports and activities programme
- Internet cafe
- Cinema
- Exhibition hall
- Christian rock groups
- Worship meetings which are the focal point of the festival are held twice-daily

In 2008, a similar programme under the banner of 'Urban Soul' began in Dublin. In January 2008, Summer Madness started in Australia.
