= Shadows Fall (song) =

Single by The Coral
- Released: 9 July 2001
- Recorded: 2001
- Studio: Pink Museum, Liverpool
- Genre: Indie rock, folk
- Length: 3:13
- Label: Deltasonic
- Songwriter: The Coral
- Producers: Mike Hunter, Pat O'Shaunessy

The Coral singles chronology
"Shadows Fall" (2001)	"The Oldest Path EP" (2001)

"Shadows Fall" is the first single by The Coral released in 2001. The songs were mixed by Mike Hunter. It was limited to 1000 copies and charted at No. 180. "Shadows Fall" and "The Ballad of Simon Diamond" are different recordings than those featured on The Coral (2002). The song was featured at number 25 in NME's top 50 singles of 2001.

== Track listing ==
CD single (DLT1)
No.	Title	Writer(s)	Length
1.	"Shadows Fall"	The Coral	3:13
2.	"The Ballad of Simon Diamond"	James Skelly, Nick Power	2:40
3.	"A Sparrow's Song"		1:21
Total length:			7:14

== Personnel ==
The Coral

- James Skelly – vocals, acoustic guitar (Simon Diamond) co-producer
- Lee Southall – guitar, co-producer
- Bill Ryder-Jones – guitar, trumpet, co-producer
- Paul Duffy – bass guitar, harmony vocals, saxophone (Simon Diamond), co-producer
- Nick Power – keyboards, harmony vocals, co-producer
- Ian Skelly – drums, co-producer, artwork

Production

- Mike Hunter – producer, mixing
- Pat O'Shaunessy – producer (track 3)

== Chart performance ==
Chart (2001)	Peak position
UK Singles (The Official Charts Company)	180
