= Goodbye (The Coral song) =

Single by The Coral

from the album The Coral
- Released: 15 July 2002
- Recorded: 2002
- Genre: Pop rock
- Length: 4:02
- Label: Deltasonic
- Songwriters: James Skelly, Nick Power
- Producer: Ian Broudie

The Coral singles chronology
| "'Skeleton Key EP'" (2002) | "Goodbye" (2002) | "Dreaming of You" (2002) |

"Goodbye" is a song by English indie rock band The Coral taken from their debut album The Coral (2002). Released in July 2002, it was the first single taken from the album and charted at #21.

== Music video ==
The music video was directed by Laurence Easeman. The video was inspired by the Wickerman, filmed in Greenfield, Holywell just outside Flint, Flintshire, Wales.

== Track listing ==
CD single (DLTCD005)
| No. | Title | Writer(s) | Length |
|---|---|---|---|
| 1. | "Goodbye" | James Skelly, Nick Power | 4:02 |
| 2. | "Good Fortune" | J. Skelly, Power | 2:37 |
| 3. | "Travelling Circus" | J. Skelly, Power | 2:38 |
| 4. | "Goodbye" (video) |
| Total length: | | | 9:17 |

CD single (DLTCD2005)
| No. | Title | Writer(s) | Length |
|---|---|---|---|
| 1. | "Goodbye" | James Skelly, Nick Power | 4:02 |
| 2. | "Dressed Like a Cow" (live Xfm session) | J. Skelly | 2:44 |
| 3. | "Goodbye" (live Xfm session) | J. Skelly, Power | 3:02 |
| 4. | "The Coral Mini Movie" (video) |
| Total length: | | | 9:52 |

7-inch single (DLT005)
| No. | Title | Writer(s) | Length |
|---|---|---|---|
| 1. | "Goodbye" | James Skelly, Nick Power | 4:02 |
| 2. | "Good Fortune" | J. Skelly, Power | 2:37 |
| 3. | "Travelling Circus" | J. Skelly, Power | 2:38 |
| Total length: | | | 9:17 |

== Personnel ==
The Coral

- James Skelly – vocals, guitar, co-producer
- Lee Southall – guitar, co-producer
- Bill Ryder-Jones – guitar, trumpet, co-producer
- Paul Duffy – bass guitar, saxophone, co-producer
- Nick Power – keyboards, co-producer
- Ian Skelly – drums, co-producer, artwork

Production

- Ian Broudie – producer
- Jon Gray – engineer
- Kenny Patterson – assistant engineer

Other personnel

- Laurence Easeman – video director

== Chart performance ==
| Chart (2002) | Peak position |
|---|---|
| UK Singles (Official Charts) | 21 |
