= Dreaming of You (The Coral song) =

2002 single by the Coral

Single by the Coral

from the album The Coral
- Released: 7 October 2002
- Genre: Pop
- Length: 2:21
- Label: Deltasonic
- Songwriter: James Skelly
- Producer: Ian Broudie

The Coral singles chronology
"Goodbye" (2002)	"Dreaming of You" (2002)	"Don't Think You're the First" (2003)

"Dreaming of You" is a song by English band the Coral from their eponymous debut album, The Coral. Released on 7 October 2002, it was the third single taken from the album and charted at number 13 on the UK Singles Chart. In October 2011, NME placed it at number 85 on its list "150 Best Tracks of the Past 15 Years".

A live version was also included on the Radio 1's Live Lounge album.

== Track listings ==
CD single (DLTCD008)
No.	Title	Writer(s)	Length
1.	"Dreaming of You"	James Skelly	2:21
2.	"Answer Me"	J. Skelly, Nick Power, Paul Duffy	3:12
3.	"Follow the Sun"	Lee Southall	1:50
4.	"Dreaming of You" (video)
Total length:			7:23

CD single (DLTCD2008)
No.	Title	Writer(s)	Length
1.	"Dreaming of You"	James Skelly	2:21
2.	"Sweet Sue"	J. Skelly	2:43
3.	"Another Turn in the Lock"	J. Skelly, Southall	3:35
4.	"Dreaming of You" (acoustic video)
Total length:			8:39

7-inch single (DLT008)
No.	Title	Writer(s)	Length
1.	"Dreaming of You"	James Skelly	2:21
2.	"Answer Me"	J. Skelly, Nick Power, Paul Duffy	3:12
3.	"Follow the Sun"	Lee Southall	1:50
Total length:			7:23

== Personnel ==
The Coral

- James Skelly – vocals, guitar, co-producer
- Lee Southall – guitar, backing vocals, lead vocals on "Follow the Sun" and "Another Turn in the Lock", co-producer
- Bill Ryder-Jones – guitar, trumpet, co-producer
- Paul Duffy – bass guitar, backing vocals, saxophone, co-producer
- Nick Power – keyboards, co-producer
- Ian Skelly – drums, co-producer, artwork

Production

- Ian Broudie – producer
- Jon Gray – engineer
- Kenny Patterson – assistant engineer

Other personnel

- Laurence Easeman – video director

== Use in media ==
- Channel 4's Free Agents used "Dreaming of You" during the ending credits of Episode 3.
- "Dreaming of You" was used in Scrubs season 2 episode 10 "My Monster".
  - It was replaced with "Dirty Minds" by Here Come the Mummies on streaming.
- The song is a playable track on the video game Lego Rock Band.
- The song featured in adverts for Asda in 2019; since then a sample of the song has been used at the end of the subsequent Asda adverts in sync with the chain's trademark rear pocket tap.
- It was featured in the film Sex Lives of the Potato Men.
- It was featured in an advert for Indeed in 2024.

== Charts ==
Chart (2002)	Peak position
Scottish Singles Sales (Official Charts)	14
UK Singles (Official Charts)	13

== Certifications ==
Region	Certification	Certified units/sales
United Kingdom (BPI)	Platinum	600,000^{‡}
^{‡} Sales+streaming figures based on certification alone.
