= Roots & Echoes =

Studio album by the Coral
- Released: 6 August 2007
- Recorded: August 2006 – February 2007
- Studio: Wheeler End; Konk; RAK
- Genre: Psychedelic rock, pop
- Length: 42:29
- Label: Deltasonic
- Producer: Craig Silvey; The Coral; Ian Broudie

The Coral chronology
The Invisible Invasion (2005)	Roots & Echoes (2007)	Butterfly House (2010)

Singles from Roots & Echoes
- 1. "Who's Gonna Find Me" Released: 30 July 2007; 2. "Jacqueline" Released: 1 October 2007; 3. "Put the Sun Back" Released: 11 February 2008

Roots & Echoes is the fifth studio album by English rock band the Coral. It was released on 6 August 2007, through Deltasonic. During the promotional cycle for their third studio album The Invisible Invasion (2005), guitarist Bill Ryder-Jones left and subsequently re-joined the band. Recording for their next album occurred between August 2006 and February 2007 at three different studios, Wheeler End, Konk, and RAK. Craig Silvey and the band co-produced the majority of the material, aside from two songs that were produced by Ian Broudie. Described as a psychedelic rock and pop album, Roots & Echoes took influences from doo wop and R&B.

Preceded by an appearance at Glastonbury Festival and a support slot in Europe for the Arctic Monkeys, "Who's Gonna Find Me" was released as the lead single on 30 July 2007. The second single "Jacqueline" appeared on 1 October 2007, coinciding with a tour of the UK. Following three shows at the end of 2007, Ryder-Jones left the band for a second time. "Put the Sun Back" was released as the third single on 11 February 2008. Over the next few months, the band performed at two festivals, and played a few one-off shows in the UK.

Roots & Echoes received generally favourable reviews from music critics, with some highlighting its sombre nature. It peaked at number eight in the UK, while also charting in France, Ireland, and Japan. All three of the album's singles charted in Scotland and the UK, with "Who's Gonna Find Me" reaching the highest at number 11 in Scotland, and number 25 in the UK.

== Background and production ==
The Coral released their third studio album The Invisible Invasion in May 2005. Two of the singles – "In the Morning" and "Something Inside of Me" – charted in the UK, with the former reaching number six. The album was promoted with appearances at Glastonbury, T in the Park, Reading and Leeds Festivals, and a headlining tour of the UK. During this time, guitarist Bill Ryder-Jones had left the band, and subsequently returned, as a result of a stress-related illness. The band then spent some time demoing new material with producer Ian Broudie of the Lightning Seeds.

Sessions for Roots & Echoes lasted between August 2006 and February 2007. The majority of the album was recorded at Wheeler End Studios in Buckinghamshire with Craig Silvey and the band as producers; Silvey handled recording with assistance from David McDonnell. "Jacqueline" and "Rebecca You" were recorded at Konk Studios in London, with Silvey and the band as producers; Silvey handled recording with assistance from Serge Krebs. "Cobwebs" and "Music at Night" were recorded at RAK Studios in London, with Broudie as producer, engineering from Phil Brown, who was assistance by Raj Das. Silvey, with assistance from Krebs again, mixed the tracks at Konk, while George Marino mastered at Sterling Sound in New York City.

== Composition and lyrics ==
Musically, the sound of Roots & Echoes has been described as psychedelic rock and pop, with influences from doo wop and Yardbirds-esque R&B, as well as the vocal stylings of Neil Diamond and Nat King Cole, and guitarwork bordering on twee pop. All of the songs on the album were written by frontman James Skelly, either by himself or co-writing with keyboardist Nick Power, Ryder-Jones, guitarist Lee Southall, or drummer Ian Skelly. Ryder-Jones wrote the strings on "Rebecca You" and "Music at Night", the latter of which was co-written with Marcus Holdaway; the pair arranged the strings. Several musicians added additional instrumentation to a few of the songs: flute by Martin Dunsdon for "Not So Lonely"; strings by Sally Herbert, Nicola Sweeney, Katherine Shave and Holdaway, and oboe by Matthew Draper on "Rebecca You"; strings by Brian Wright, Herbert, Jackie Norrie, Ellen Blair, Holdaway, and oboe by Draper and Leila Ward on "Music at Night".

The blues rock and psychedelic folk song "Who's Gonna Find Me" opens the album, leading into "Remember Me", which talks about unrequited love. "Put the Sun Back is a Kinks-indebted song lamenting the loss of a loved one, and precedes "Jacqueline", a country-esque track in the style of Shack. "Fireflies" recalls the worked of Echo & the Bunnymen, and is followed by the Spaghetti Western-esque "In the Rain". "Not So Lonely" is an acoustic ballad in the vein of Scott Walker, with James Skelly crooning in a manner of Roy Orbison, and is followed by "Cobwebs", a country track akin to "Gentle on My Mind" (1967) by Glen Campbell. The ballad "Rebecca You" precedes "She's Got a Reason", which incorporates bossa nova beats. The album closes with the 13th Floor Elevators-tinged "Music at Night"; it builds from brushed snare hits and plucking guitar strings, into chamber pop with its strings and woodwind instrumentation.

== Release ==
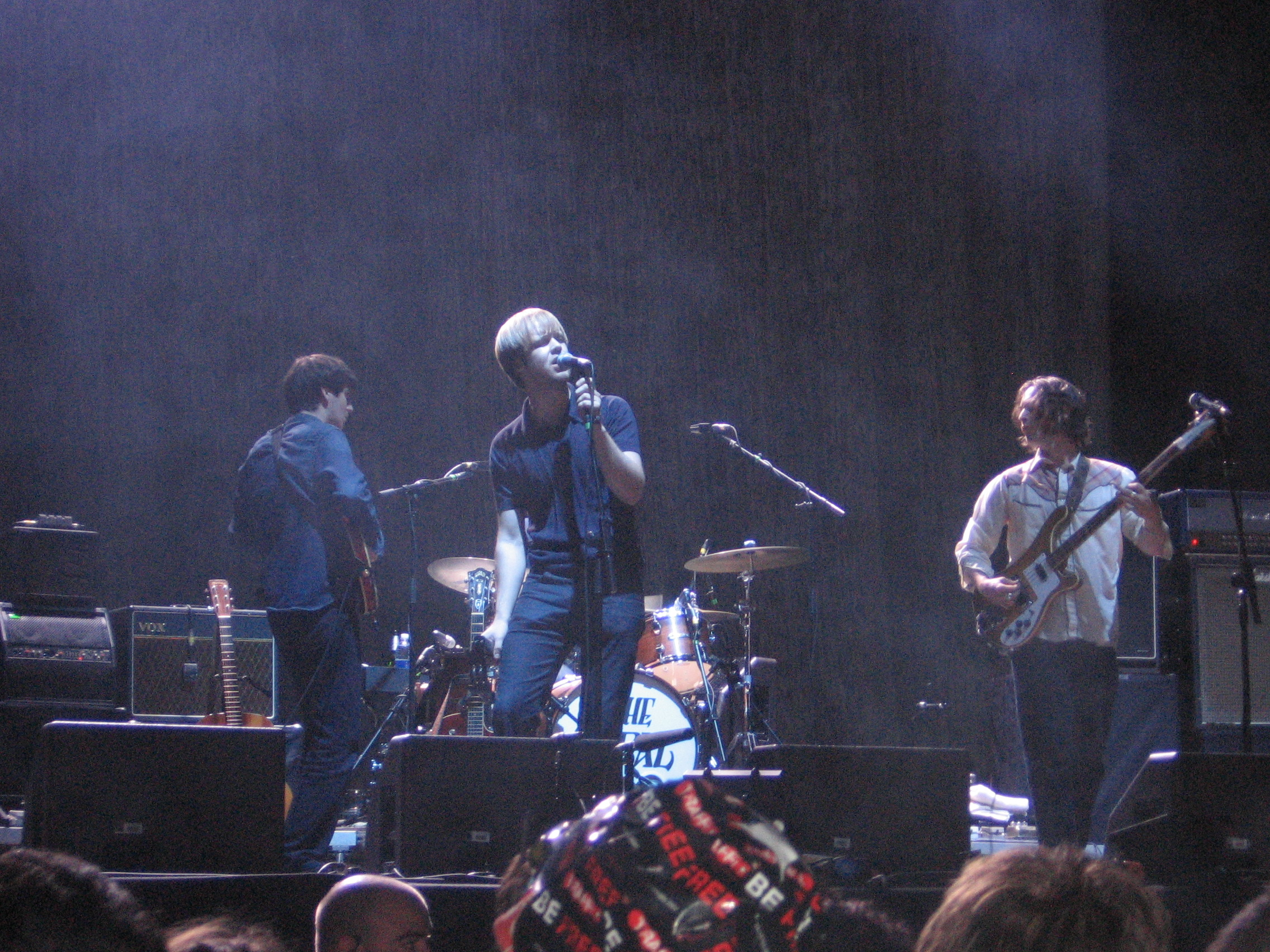
The Coral toured throughout 2007 and 2008 for Roots & Echoes.

In March 2007, the Coral performed at a Teenage Cancer Trust benefit, where they debuted "Who's Gonna Find Me" and "Put the Sun Back". On 4 June 2007, Roots & Echoes was announced for release in three months' time. The band played three shows with the Arctic Monkeys in the UK later in the month, leading up to an appeared at the Glastonbury Festival, before supporting them on a tour of Europe. "Who's Gonna Find Me" was released as a single on 30 July 2007. Two versions were released on 7" vinyl: the first with a cover of "Ghostriders in the Sky" (1948) by Stan Jones, while the second included "The Voice". The CD version featured "Laughing Eyes", and the music video for "Who's Gonna Find Me".

Roots & Echoes was released on 6 August 2007; the Japanese edition included "The Voice" and "Laughing Eyes" as extra tracks. The US version was released on 14 August 2007. The artwork features a monochrome image of the band posing with their guitars, which was designed by Ian Skelly and Power's brother Kevin. "Jacqueline" was released a single on 1 October 2007. Two versions were released on 7" vinyl: the first with an acoustic version of "Far from the Crowd", while the second included an acoustic version of "Who's Gonna Find Me". The CD version featured "Pictures from the Other Side", "The Visitor", and the music video for "Jacqueline". Coinciding with this, the band went on a tour of the UK, with support from the Courteeners and the Metros; the latter band was kicked off the tour due to rowdy behaviour several shows in.

The Coral closed out the year with three shows in Liverpool close to their home in December 2007, with support from the View and the Twang. On 9 January 2008, it was announced that Ryder-Jones had left the band again, which was attributed to panic attacks and distaste for touring in a popular band. "Put the Sun Back" was released as a single on 11 February 2008. Two versions were released on 7" vinyl: the first with "The Dance Lingers On", while the second included "One Winters Day". The CD version features "Willow Song", a live version of "Put the Sun Back", and the music video for it. The following month, the band played two shows to celebrate Saint Patrick's Day, with support from the Aliens and Florence and the Machine. In the following months, the band headlined Long on the Farm festival, as well as appearing at Latitude Festival, and playing one-off shows in London and Birmingham.

== Reception ==
Professional ratings
Aggregate scores
Source	Rating
Metacritic	70/100
Review scores
Source	Rating
AllMusic	4/5 stars
DIY	2/5 stars
Drowned in Sound	6/10
The Guardian	3/5 stars
NME	7/10 stars
The Observer	4/5 stars
Pitchfork	5.2/10
Q	4/5 stars
The Stranger	2/4 stars
Yahoo Music Radio	7/10 stars

Roots & Echoes was met with generally favourable from music critics. At Metacritic, which assigns a normalized rating out of 100 to reviews from mainstream publications, the album received an average score of 70, based on 16 reviews.

AllMusic reviewer Stewart Mason noted that the Coral's music in the preceding years has been "ignored by most folks outside of a devoted cult", and Roots & Echoes "isn't going to change that." He complimented Skelly's "sweet-toned" voice as being the "perfect accompaniment to the melodic sweep of the songs". NME's Louis Pattison said upon further listens of the album, it was clear to him that "this is the sound of a cleaner, happier Coral", with the band having "decided to cut the gobbledegook, push the skeletons back in the closet and become the classic band they've sometimes promised to be." Graeme Thomson of The Observer saw it as a "brighter, considerably more settled record" than their past works, coming across as a band "harnessing their strengths". Yahoo Music Radio writer Niall O'Keeffe said that the "mid-paced, melancholic guitar pop" which provides a firm base for Skelly's "ever-extraordinary vocals", with a "pleasantly dreamy, wistful atmosphere" throughout the album.

The Guardian critic Maddy Costa said the album's title laid out its "goals, and its shortcomings", lacking the "idiosyncratic spirit" of their second studio album Magic and Medicine (2003) that was "so appealing." Drowned in Sound's Dom Gourlay wrote that a number of the band's "trademark eccentricities find themselves watered down and flushed out into over-sentimental ballad territory." He saw the album as a "patchy return" that would be unlikely to "win them any new converts." Pitchfork contributor Stuart Berman wrote that Skelly's "lyrical concerns [are] now entirely consumed by matters of romance and regret", which in some of the "more pedestrian turns", regularly "feels devoid of passionate intent". The Stranger writer Jonathan Zwickel said the album "offers a little to like, a little to shrug at", with the band showcasing "reliable talent, but, thanks to overfamiliarity, rarely rise above merely competent." Sián Rowe of DIY said the band "don't even seem excited themselves", as the "ghostly backing vocals and plodding riffs" that the album displays. It "might have shown that the band aren't afraid of change, but it's also confirmed that they're bloody boring."

Roots & Echoes peaked at number eight in the UK. It also reached number 33 in Ireland, number 80 in Japan, and number 84 in France. "Who's Gonna Find Me" charted at number 11 in Scotland, and number 25 in the UK. "Jacqueline" peaked at number 18 in Scotland, and number 44 in the UK. "Put the Sun" charted at number 64 in both Scotland and the UK. Q ranked the album at number 22 on their list of the best 50 albums for the year.

== Track listing ==
Writing credits per booklet.

No.	Title	Writer(s)	Producer	Length
1.	"Who's Gonna Find Me"	James Skelly; Nick Power	Craig Silvey; The Coral	3:27
2.	"Remember Me"	J. Skelly	Silvey; The Coral	3:27
3.	"Put the Sun Back"	J. Skelly	Silvey; The Coral	3:04
4.	"Jacqueline"	J. Skelly; Power	Silvey; The Coral	3:30
5.	"Fireflies"	J. Skelly; Bill Ryder-Jones	Silvey; The Coral	3:59
6.	"In the Rain"	J. Skelly; Power	Silvey; The Coral	3:08
7.	"Not So Lonely"	J. Skelly	Silvey; The Coral	3:47
8.	"Cobwebs"	J. Skelly; Lee Southall; Ian Skelly	Ian Broudie	3:31
9.	"Rebecca You"	J. Skelly; Power	Silvey; The Coral	3:52
10.	"She's Got a Reason"	J. Skelly	Silvey; The Coral	4:28
11.	"Music at Night"	J. Skelly; Ryder-Jones	Broudie	6:15
Total length:				42:29

== Personnel ==
Personnel per booklet.

The Coral

- James Skelly – vocals, guitar
- Lee Southall – guitar
- Bill Ryder-Jones – guitar, string arranger (tracks 9 and 11)
- Paul Duffy – bass guitar
- Nick Power – keyboards
- Ian Skelly – drums

Additional musicians

- Martin Holdaway – string arranger (tracks 9 and 11), strings (tracks 9 and 11)
- Martin Dunsdon – flute (track 7)
- Sally Herbert – strings (tracks 9 and 11)
- Nicola Sweeney – strings (track 9)
- Katherine Shave – strings (track 9)
- Matthew Draper – oboe (tracks 9 and 11)
- Brian Wright – strings (track 11)
- Jackie Norrie – strings (track 11)
- Ellen Blair – strings (track 11)
- Leila Ward – oboe (tracks 9 and 11)

Production and design

- Craig Silvey – producer (all except tracks 8 and 11), recording, mixing
- The Coral – producer (all except tracks 8 and 11)
- Ian Broudie – producer (tracks 8 and 11)
- David McDonnell – assistant
- Serge Krebs – assistant
- Phil Brown – engineer
- Raj Das – assistant
- George Marino – mastering
- Kevin Power – art, design, cover design, photography
- Ian Skelly – cover design
- Ray Tang – photography

== Charts ==
Chart performance for Roots & Echoes
Chart (2007)	Peak position
French Albums (SNEP)	84
Irish Albums (IRMA)	33
Japan (Oricon)	80
Scottish Albums (OCC)	10
UK Albums (OCC)	8
UK Album Downloads (OCC)	11
