= The Invisible Invasion =

Studio album by the Coral
- Released: 23 May 2005
- Studio: Monnow Valley, Elevator
- Genre: Psychedelia
- Length: 39:42
- Label: Deltasonic
- Producer: Adrian Utley, Geoff Barrow

The Coral chronology
Nightfreak and the Sons of Becker (2004)	The Invisible Invasion (2005)	Roots & Echoes (2007)

Singles from The Invisible Invasion
- 1. "In the Morning" Released: 9 May 2005; 2. "Something Inside of Me" Released: 22 August 2005

The Invisible Invasion is the fourth studio album by English rock band the Coral. It was released on 23 May 2005, through Deltasonic. Following on from the stop-gap release of the mini album Nightfreak and the Sons of Becker (2004), the band began recording their next album with Geoff Barrow and Adrian Utley of Portishead as producers. Sessions were mainly held at Monnow Valley Studio, with additional recording being done at Elevator Studios. Described as a psychedelia album, it had more of a stripped-down sound compared to their past releases.

"In the Morning" was released as the lead single to The Invisible Invasion on 9 May 2005. The Coral supported with performances at the Glastonbury and T in the Park festivals, alongside a support slot for three Oasis gigs; guitarist Bill Ryder-Jones was absent due to a stress-related illness. The album's second single "Something Inside of Me" was released on 22 August 2005, which was followed by an appearance at the Reading and Leeds Festivals. The band went on a tour of the United Kingdom in October 2005, and closed out the year with two more shows in that territory.

The Invisible Invasion received generally favourable reviews from music critics, with some highlighting its stripped-down nature. It peaked at number five in the UK, while also charting in France, Ireland, and Japan. The album would later be certified gold in the UK, while "In the Morning" was certified silver. Both of the album's singles charted in the UK, while "In the Morning" also charted in Ireland, and "Something Inside of Me" also charted in Scotland.

== Background and production ==
The Coral released their second studio album Magic and Medicine in July 2003. Its four singles – "Don't Think You're the First", "Pass It On", "Secret Kiss", and "Bill McCai" – all reached the top 30 of the UK Singles Chart, with "Pass It On" peaking the highest at number five. In January 2004, the band released Nightfreak and the Sons of Becker, a mini album that acted as a stop-gap release until they could begin work on their third studio album. The Invisible Invasion was produced by Geoff Barrow and Adrian Utley of Portishead; the majority of it was recorded at Monnow Valley, with the exception of "A Warning to the Curious", which was recorded at Elevator Studios in Liverpool.

Keyboardist Nick Power said the band were big fans of Portishead but did not approach them about any producing work, until "word got back to us that they were big fans of ours." Additional recording for "She Sings the Mourning", "Cripples Crown", "So Long Ago", "Far from the Crowd", and "Arabian Sand" was done at Elevator, with assistance Matthew Edge. Utley served as engineer for all the recordings, with assistance from Steve Davis and Edge. The band took a brief break from recording to play a one-off show in Bath. Barrow, Utley and Craig Silvey mixed the recordings at Moles Studio in Bath, with mix engineer Nick Joplin, and assistance from Paul Corkett. The album was then mastered by Frank Arkwright at Whitfield Street Studios.

== Composition and lyrics ==
Musically, the sound of The Invisible Invasion has been described as psychedelia. It had more of a stripped-down sound than their past releases. Frontman James Skelly wrote the majority of the album, either by himself or co-writing with Power, guitarist Bill Ryder-Jones or guitarist Lee Southall; the band as a whole wrote "Arabian Sand". The opening track, "She Sings the Mourning", featured bowed guitar and a shuffle beat, earning it a comparison to Can. James Skelly said "Cripples Crown" referred to a "rock in Runcorn that me and Ian [Skelly] used to say Jesus threw the devil off." The folk-pop song "So Long Ago" is a homage to the Wright brothers, and is followed by the new wave track "The Operator".

"A Warning to the Curious" was compared to "My White Devil" (1983) by Echo & the Bunnymen. "In the Morning" is a pop rock song about small town melancholy, reminiscent of the work of the Boo Radleys. "Something Inside of Me" recalled the work of Madness. "Come Home" sees the narrator waiting for his partner to come home, which is continued into "Far from the Crowd"; the latter includes a tribal beat. The folk-pop song "Leaving Today" was done in the vein of the Byrds, and is followed by "Arabian Sand", which was influenced by Mad Man in the Desert, a painting by artist Salvador Dalí. The album closes with the folk-pop ballad "Late Afternoon".

== Release ==
"In the Morning" was released as a single on 9 May 2005. Two versions were released on CD in the UK: the first with "Leeslunchboxbyblueleadandthevelcrounderpants", while the second featured "Gina Jones", "The Image of Richard Burton as Crom", and the music video for "In the Morning". The Invisible Invasion was released on 23 May 2005, through Deltasonic; its title is taken from "Something Inside of Me". Some copies came with a bonus disc consisting of a live session recorded for BBC Radio 1's Lamacq Live. The Japanese edition included "Gina Jones" and "Leeslunchboxbyblueleadandthevelcrounderpants" as extra tracks. Following this, they appeared at Glastonbury Festival and T in the Park, and supported Oasis for three shows; Ryder-Jones was absent from these shows due to a stress-related illness.

"Something Inside of Me" was released as a single on 22 August 2005. Two versions were released on CD in the UK: the first with "The Conjurer", while the second included "The Case of Arthur Tannen", "The Box", and the music video for "Something Inside of Me". Following this, the band performed at the Reading and Leeds Festivals. In October 2005, the band went on a tour of the UK. In November 2005, it was revealed that Sony was distributing albums with Extended Copy Protection, a controversial feature that automatically installed rootkit software if played on any Microsoft Windows machine. Alongside being unable to copy CDs, the software reported the users' listening habits back to Sony and exposed the computer to malicious attacks via exploits. In spite of Sony refusing to release a list of the affected albums, the Electronic Frontier Foundation identified The Invisible Invasion as one of the discs with the software. The band closed the year with two UK shows in December 2005.

=== Extended copy protection ===
In the fall of 2005, The Invisible Invasion appeared on a list of the 52 CD releases from Sony BMG that were identified as having been shipped with the controversial Extended Copy Protection (XCP) computer software, which, in addition to preventing a copy of the disc from being made, was identified by many security software vendors as having also reported the users' listening habits back to Sony and also exposed any Microsoft Windows computer known to have the CD inserted to malicious attacks that exploited insecure features of the rootkit software. Sony discontinued use of the technology on 11 November 2005, and recalled this and other titles affected by XCP, and asked customers to submit copies affected by the software to the company so that it could replace them with copies that did not contain the software.

== Reception ==
Professional ratings
Aggregate scores
Source	Rating
Metacritic	73/100
Review scores
Source	Rating
AllMusic	4.5/5 stars
Drowned in Sound	8/10
The Guardian	4/5 stars
NME	7/10
Now	3/5
Pitchfork	6/10
PopMatters	6/10
Rolling Stone	3/5 stars
Slant Magazine	2.5/5 stars
Yahoo! Launch	7/10 stars

The Invisible Invasion was met with generally favourable from music critics. At Metacritic, which assigns a normalized rating out of 100 to reviews from mainstream publications, the album received an average score of 73, based on 21 reviews.

AllMusic reviewer Tim Sendra said "[t]hings are pretty much as you would expect them to be", citing Skelly as "still channel[ing] the voice of Ian McCullough, the guitars [...] still sparkle and shine, and the band is still inventive and interesting." The major difference he found was the "stripped-down and focused sound", aided by Barrow and Utley. He called the tracks on the album "among the best they have written and are quite varied as well". Dom Gourlay of Drowned in Sound wrote that it was "far from being a difficult third album, instead providing another shining example that the Grandsons of Invention have plenty more use for their test tubes and bunsen burners just yet.". The Guardian's Maddy Costa said the band "attempt[ed] to fuse both sides of their personality", the "[d]emented, fractious, febrile psychedelia" and "[j]aunty, impish, unaffected pop". She noted that while not "everything on the album is so compelling", if the listen felt their "attention drifting it gets snagged again by an impenetrably peculiar lyric [... it's] sounds only the Coral can produce." NME writer Simon Hayes Budgen said that in spite of Barrow and Utley's production, the record was "still clearly a Coral album," with the "chirpy psychedelia" having been sedated "considerably and no longer dominates the speakers." He added that the band "get the chance to show that they can turn in proper, craft-standard pop when they need to."

Jamie Gill of Yahoo! Launch said having Barrow and Utley produce the album made it come across as "reliably clean and gleaming". He added that listeners would "never be ashamed to own but wouldn’t necessarily feel the need to play all that often, either." Now's Elizabeth Bromstein noted that it had a "darker, more lonesome feel [...] but in a fun way, with plenty of whimsy." She considered the "whole 60s pop thing [...] tired", in spite of this, "instrumentally this is a great record." In a review for Rolling Stone, Christian Hoard wrote that the band "sometimes sound small, especially when they up the tempo on self-consciously trippy cuts" like the opening track, "but on The Invisible Invasion they better themselves by refusing to try so damn hard." Pitchfork contributor Adam Moerder wrote that the band "reverted to a subdued and almost jaded sound", with the album displaying "way too many wrinkles and stretch marks". PopMatters reviewer Stephen Haag said if their debut album "didn't break them Stateside, then nothing will." He added that The Invisible Invasion name "may prove to be an unfortunately apt title in America", while it "doesn't have to, and shouldn't, be this way.". Jonathan Keefe of Slant Magazine found it to do "nothing to distinguish itself" from the band's peers; while it contained "enough of a paranoid streak to pass for thematic coherence", that "doesn’t automatically mean depth."

The Invisible Invasion peaked at number five in the UK. It also reached number 16 in Ireland, number 53 in Japan, and number 104 in France. "In the Morning" charted at number six in the UK, and number 28 in Ireland. "Something Inside of Me" peaked at number 42 in the UK, and number 83 in Scotland. The Invisible Invasion was certified gold by the British Phonographic Industry (BPI), while "In the Morning" went silver.

== Track listing ==
Writing credits per booklet.

No.	Title	Writer(s)	Length
1.	"She Sings the Mourning"	James Skelly; Nick Power	3:08
2.	"Cripples Crown"	J. Skelly; Power	3:38
3.	"So Long Ago"	J. Skelly; Power; Bill Ryder-Jones	2:42
4.	"The Operator"	J. Skelly	2:20
5.	"A Warning to the Curious"	J. Skelly; Power; Ryder-Jones	3:56
6.	"In the Morning"	J. Skelly	2:33
7.	"Something Inside of Me"	J. Skelly	2:26
8.	"Come Home"	J. Skelly; Power; Ryder-Jones	4:14
9.	"Far from the Crowd"	J. Skelly	3:39
10.	"Leaving Today"	J. Skelly; Lee Southall	3:08
11.	"Arabian Sand"	The Coral	4:02
12.	"Late Afternoon"	J. Skelly	3:56
Total length:			39:42

== Personnel ==
Personnel per booklet.

The Coral

- James Skelly – vocals, guitar
- Lee Southall – guitar, backing vocals
- Bill Ryder-Jones – guitar
- Paul Duffy – bass guitar, backing vocals
- Nick Power – keyboards, backing vocals
- Ian Skelly – drums

Production and design

- Geoff Barrow – producer, mixing
- Adrian Utley – producer, engineer, mixing
- Steve Davis – assistant engineer (all except track 5)
- Matthew Edge – assistant engineer (track 5), additional recordings assistance (tracks 1–3, 9 and 11)
- Craig Silvey – mixing
- Nick Joplin – assistant mix engineer
- Paul Corkett – additional mix assistant
- Claire Lewis – additional monitoring assistant
- Frank Arkwright – mastering
- Ian Skelly – art, design
- Kevin Power – art, design

== Charts ==
Chart performance for The Invisible Invasion
Chart (2005)	Peak position
French Albums (SNEP)	104
Irish Albums (IRMA)	16
Japan (Oricon)	53
UK Albums (OCC)	3
