= Magic and Medicine =

Studio album by the Coral
- Released: 28 July 2003
- Recorded: October 2002 – April 2003
- Studios: Elevator, Liverpool
- Genres: Pop rock, psychedelic pop
- Length: 41:10
- Label: Deltasonic
- Producers: Ian Broudie, the Coral (co.)

The Coral chronology
The Coral (2002)	Magic and Medicine (2003)	Nightfreak and the Sons of Becker (2004)

Singles from Magic and Medicine
- 1. "Don't Think You're the First" Released: 3 March 2003; 2. "Pass It On" Released: 14 July 2003; 3. "Secret Kiss" Released: 6 October 2003; 4. "Bill McCai" Released: 24 November 2003

Magic and Medicine is the second studio album by English rock band the Coral. It was released on 28 July 2003, through Deltasonic. Within three months of releasing their self-titled debut studio album, the band began recording material for their next album in October 2002. Sessions were produced by the Lightning Seeds frontman Ian Broudie, with co-production from the Coral; recording continued in-between tours of the United States and Europe, finishing in April 2003. Described as a pop rock and psychedelic pop release, Magic and Medicine was compared to the work of the Animals, with frontman James Skelly's vocals recalling that band's frontman Eric Burdon.

"Don't Think You're the First" served as the lead single from Magic and Medicine, released on 3 March 2003. The Coral toured the following month, and then performed at the Midsummer Night's Scream and Glastonbury Festivals. "Pass It On" was released as the second single on 14 July 2003, which was followed by further festivals appearances, at International de Benicassim and V Festival, and a supporting slot for Blur on their European tour. The album's third and fourth singles, "Secret Kiss" and "Bill McCai", were released on 6 October 2003 and 24 November 2003, respectively; the latter coincided with a UK tour in the same month.

Magic and Medicine received generally favourable reviews from music critics, with some finding it an improvement over the Coral's debut album. It topped the charts in both Scotland and the UK, while also charting in Belgium, France, Germany, Ireland, Japan, New Zealand, Norway, and Sweden. The album was later certified gold in the UK, while "Pass It On" was certified silver. All four of the album's singles reached the top 30 in both Scotland and the UK, with "Pass It On" reaching the highest at number five in both territories.

== Background and production ==
The Coral released their self-titled debut studio album in July 2002, through Deltasonic; it charted at number five in the United Kingdom, where it was subsequently certified gold. Its two singles – "Goodbye" and "Dreaming of You" – became top 30 hits in both the UK and Scotland, with the latter reaching number 13 in the UK. The album was promoted with three tours of the UK, including a co-headlining one with the Music, as well as performances at the Isle of Wight and V Festivals. Following a period at home, the band opted to make an album relating to "where we lived; the dark side of small town life. Street parties, silver tea-sets, secret suicides". By October 2002, they were recording material for it; Ian Broudie of the Lightning Seeds as the main producer, with co-production from the band, and Jon Gray acting as engineer. Seven backing tracks were made over the course of five days at Elevator Studios in Liverpool.

After this, the Coral went on a tour of the UK, before returning to the studio later in the month. In early 2003, the band supported Supergrass on their tour of the United States, which featured appearances on Late Night with Conan O'Brien and Last Call with Carson Daly, and then went to Europe. Following the conclusion of tour, the band held further recording sessions, having recorded up to 35 songs by this point. The Coral were due to embark on a tour of the UK in February 2003; however, guitarist Lee Southall suffered from tendonitis. As a result of this, Broudie played rhythm guitar on "Pass It On". Deltasonic co-founder Alan Wills remarked that the band did not record any single-sounding songs, prompting them to record two songs from earlier in their career, "Bill McCai" and "Pass It On". The album was finished by April 2003; it was mastered by Gary Butler at RST Onestop in Prescot, Merseyside.

== Composition and lyrics ==
Musically, the sound of Magic and Medicine has been described as pop rock, and psychedelic pop, compared to the work of the Animals, with frontman James Skelly's vocals recalling the Animals frontman Eric Burdon. Keyboardist Nick Power said they wanted the album to be more "organic [... with] a strong acoustic vibe", in contrast to the "really spontaneous" self-titled album. Skelly wrote over half of the album, with the remainder co-written with Power or guitarist Bill Ryder-Jones; "Eskimo Lament" was written solely by Power. Additional musicians appeared on the recordings: Louis Baccino with a flute on "Don't Think You're the First"; Megan Childs of Gorky's Zygotic Mynci with a violin on "Milkwood Blues"; Martin Smith, Simon James and Andy Frizell with brass on "Eskimo Lament" and "Confessions of A.D.D.D."; Ollie Brindley with double bass on "All of Our Love"; and Andy Brindley with a harmonica on "All of Our Love".

The opening track, "In the Forest", begins with Power's organ, setting a darker mood for the rest of the album. Skelly said the chorus lyrics were adapted from a Woody Guthrie track; bassist Paul Duffy said his part was influenced by the work of the Beach Boys. "Don't Think You're the First" begins similar to songs by the Doors, with a key change during the middle section, accompanied by a melodica, before leading into dub reggae. The title was inspired from an occasion where Skelly played what he thought was a new chord shape. While Duffy said it influenced by a song by Nat King Cole, the rest of the band said the music was a homage to the sound of Joe Meek, with guitarist Lee Southall using part of his instrument to make Meek-like percussion. "Liezah" is an acoustic song, with a melody evoking Belle and Sebastian, that talks about a character that was influenced by The Sun Also Rises (1926) by Ernest Hemingway. Power and Skelly wrote it while they were travelling to Birmingham. shortly after Ryder-Jones showed Skelly how to play a Simon & Garfunkel track on guitar. The band compared the Moby Grape-indebted "Talkin' Gypsy Market Blues" to work of Cheech & Chong and "Motorpsycho Nitemare" (1964) by Bob Dylan. Skelly wrote it after he bought a pair of boots from a gypsy market while holidaying with his girlfriend in Portugal. "Secret Kiss" is a slower song with an organ part in the vein of the Doors keyboardist Ray Manzarek, and a clipping guitar riff styled after Pink Floyd. It came about after listening to the Chordettes, Love and ballroom music, with one of the lyrics being directly take from "Soft Sands" (1957) by the Chordettes.

"Milkwood Blues", which includes jazz breakdowns and ends with a violin, discusses being in a small town while tripping on acid. It features Wills reading from Under Milk Wood (1954) by Thomas. "Bill McCai" is an upbeat folk rock song about a sad middle-aged man who dies by its conclusion. The track, which pre-dated their debut album, was initially passed on when Ian Skelly thought it sounded closer to Travis. "Eskimo Lament" features gentle piano, plucked guitarwork and a trumpet; Power said he wanted it to have a "funeral procession feel", attempting to emulate "I'm Only Sleeping" (1966) by the Beatles and "Rockin' Chair" (1969) by the Band. With the ballad "Careless Hands", which sees James Skelly's voice recall Lee Mavers of the La's, Skelly wanted to compose a track that "Jonny Mathis could sing". "Pass It On" is an acoustic song that sees Skelly discussing his mortality, with a melody reminiscent of Paul McCartney. He had written the song when he was 17 year-old while on a train visiting Power. Power said "All of Our Love" recalled "I Won't Hurt You" (1966) by the West Coast Pop Art Experimental Band. The closing track, "Confessions of A.D.D.D.", is a love song, akin to the works of the Super Furry Animals. It is a homage to Arthur Lee of Love, and ends with a three minute extended jam section. The "A.D.D.D." part of the title, which stands for A Damp Dog Day, was spoken by Deltasonic co-founder Joe Fearon; Power theorised that it related to the film Dog Day Afternoon (1975). Skelly said the lyrics were inspired from a book he owned about pirates.

== Release ==
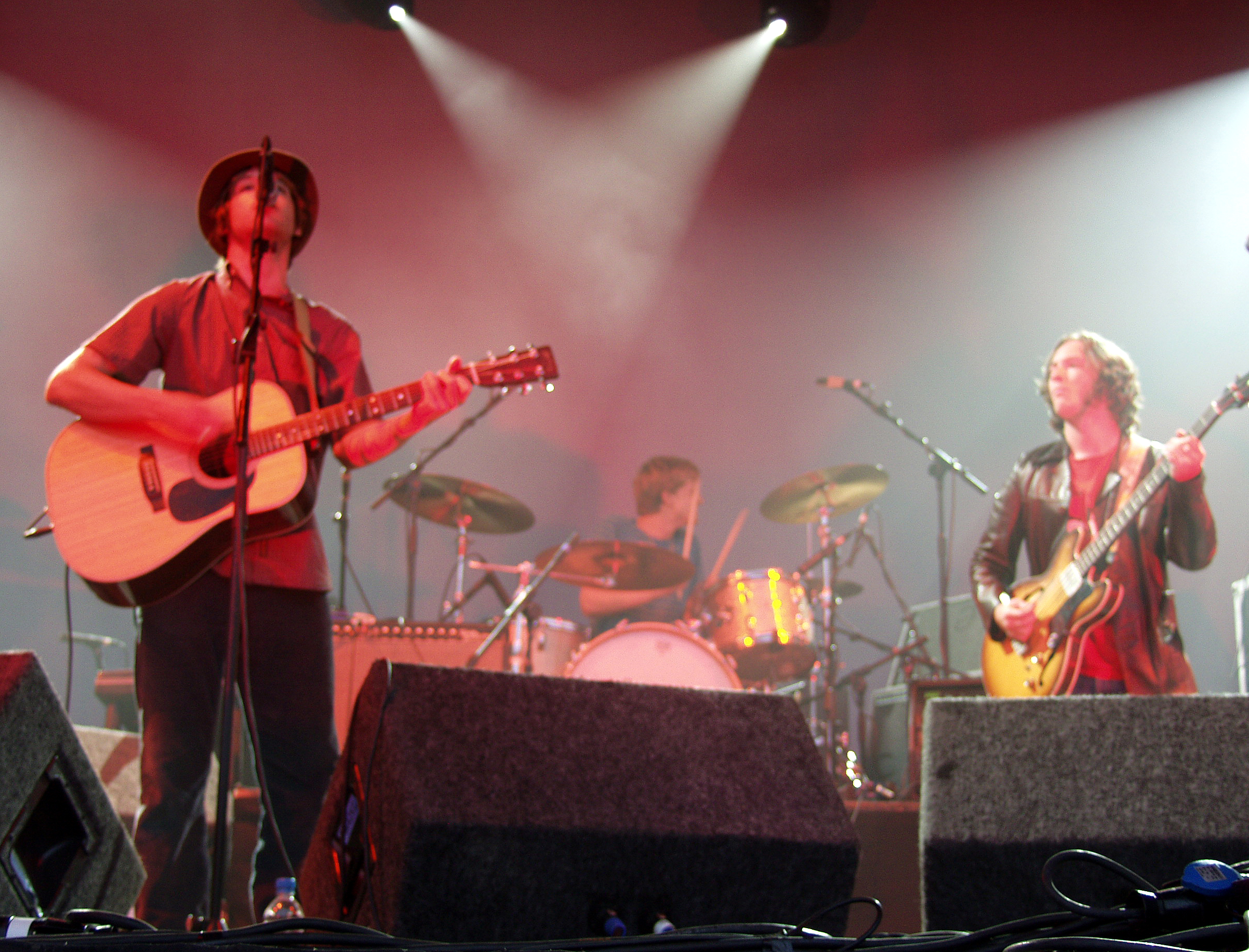
The Coral toured throughout 2003 for Magic and Medicine.

"Don't Think You're the First" was released as the lead single from Magic and Medicine on 3 March 2003. Two versions were released on CD in the UK: the first with "Witchcraft", "See-Through Bergerac", and the music video for "Don't Think You're the First", while the second featured "Tiger Lily" and "Teenage Machine Age". The "Don't Think You're the First" video was filmed in a forest close to where the members lived. The Coral's February 2003 UK trek was rescheduled for April and May 2003, with support from the Basement. In June 2003, the band headlined A Midsummer Night's Scream festival in their hometown, and then performed at that year's Glastonbury Festival. "Pass It On" was released as a single on 14 July 2003. The CD version included "Run Run" and an acoustic version of "Shadows Falls"; the DVD version featured the videos for "Pass It On", an acoustic version of "Calendars and Clocks", "Heartaches and Pancakes", and The Curry File Documentary. For the "Pass It On" music video, the band were in the middle of touring with Supergrass when they stopped off at a ghost town near Randsburg, California. They contacted Wills, who promptly booked director James Slater, flying him out the following day. Part of the video was filmed inside a shack owned by Jenny Olsen, who can be seen in it dancing around ram skulls.

Originally scheduled for release on 21 July 2003 under the name Matrix Farm, Magic and Medicine was eventually released a week later on 28 July 2003. The Japanese edition included "When Good Times Go Bad" and "Boys at the Window" as extra tracks. In August 2003, the band appeared at the International de Benicassim and V Festivals. Following this, they toured across Europe supporting Blur. "Secret Kiss" was released as a single on 6 October 2003. Two versions were released on CD in the UK: the first with "Who's That Knockin'", "See My Love", and the music video for "Secret Kiss", while the second included "God Knows" and "Not the Girl". The "Secret Kiss" video was filmed in alleyways and local social clubs; the band said it starred "belly dancers, ballroom dancers, monks gowns and an Alsatian", which they considered it to be akin to the Rolling Thunder Revue, "but in a retirement town". "Bill McCai" was released as a single on 24 November 2003. Two versions were released on CD in the UK: the first with "Boy at the Window", "Nosferatu", and the music video for "Bill McCai", while the second featured "When the Good Times Go Bad" and "From a Leaf to a Tree". The "Bill McCai" music video was filmed in Amsterdam the previous month. Magic and Medicine was released in the US on 10 February 2004 as a two-CD release, packaged with the Nightfreak and the Sons of Becker (2004) mini album.

== Reception ==
Professional ratings
Aggregate scores
Source	Rating
Metacritic	76/100
Review scores
Source	Rating
AllMusic	3.5/5 stars
Blender	3/5 stars
Entertainment Weekly	B
The Guardian	3/5 stars
Mojo	3/5 stars
NME	8/10
Pitchfork	6.7/10
Q	4/5 stars
Rolling Stone	3/5 stars
Uncut	4/5 stars

Magic and Medicine was met with generally favourable from music critics. At Metacritic, which assigns a normalized rating out of 100 to reviews from mainstream publications, the album received an average score of 76, based on 18 reviews.

In a review for Entertainment Weekly, Greg Kot wrote that it lacked "the self-titled debut's exhilarating peaks," though found Magic and Medicine to be "more consistent." NME's Ted Kessler said it was "[n]ot quite" a landmark album, "[i]t is still, nevertheless, a quite dazzling album." AllMusic reviewer Tim DiGravina wrote that the Coral "rein in their influences and just stick with the program of creating rocking tunes." He added that the "songwriting, playing, and production are so subtle," Magic and Medicine comes across as a "mature, solid throwback." Blender writer Dorian Lynskey said it was "more mature, more focused and a little less fun" than their debut.

In a review for Rolling Stone, Jenny Eliscu wrote that with a number of the "flower-power rockers" the Coral imitate, they "seem to have run out of material after they recorded their debut." She added that Magic and Medicine "is little more than mimicry and affectation", taking from "the playbooks of true Sixties weirdos", such as Love and the Seeds. Pitchfork contributor Neil Robertson noted the "frenetic freakout leanings" of their debut had been removed "in favor of a more humble approach", with more emphasis on the song writing, "[i]t all sounds far less interesting." David Peschek of The Guardian referred to the album as "an ultimately frustrating piece of work", while "more often than not this music feels like a tasteful collection of lovely sounds rather than songs."

Magic and Medicine topped the chart in the UK and Scotland. It also reached number four in Ireland, number 20 in Norway, number 39 in the Wallonia region of Belgium, number 43 in New Zealand, number 60 in Sweden, number 64 in France, number 69 in Japan, and number 99 in Germany. "Don't Think You're the First" reached number ten in the UK, and number 11 in Scotland. "Pass It On" reached number five in the UK and Scotland, and was certified silver by the British Phonographic Industry (BPI) in 2024. "Secret Kiss" reached number 25 in the UK, and number 28 in Scotland. "Bill McCai" reached number 23 in the UK, and number 28 in Scotland. Magic and Medicine appeared at number 78 on the 2003 UK year-end chart. The album was certified gold by the BPI. Playlouder ranked it at number five on their list of the 20 worst albums of the year.

== Track listing ==
All songs written by James Skelly, except where noted.

No.	Title	Writer(s)	Length
1.	"In the Forest"	J. Skelly; Nick Power	2:39
2.	"Don't Think You're the First"		4:03
3.	"Liezah"	J. Skelly; Power	3:31
4.	"Talkin' Gypsy Market Blues"		3:07
5.	"Secret Kiss"		2:56
6.	"Milkwood Blues"		3:54
7.	"Bill McCai"		2:37
8.	"Eskimo Lament"	Power	2:30
9.	"Careless Hands"	J. Skelly; Bill Ryder-Jones	4:14
10.	"Pass It On"		2:19
11.	"All of Our Love"	J. Skelly; Power	3:06
12.	"Confessions of A.D.D.D."		6:20

== Personnel ==
Personnel per booklet.

The Coral

- James Skelly – vocals, guitar
- Nick Power – piano, organ, backing vocals
- Lee Southall – guitar, backing vocals
- Bill Ryder-Jones – guitar
- Paul Duffy – bass guitar, backing vocals
- Ian Skelly – drums

Additional musicians

- Louis Baccino – flute (track 2)
- Megan Childs – violin (track 6)
- Martin Smith – brass (tracks 8 and 12)
- Simon James – brass (tracks 8 and 12)
- Andy Frizell – brass (tracks 8 and 12)
- Ollie Brindley – double bass (track 11)
- Andy Brindley – harmonica (track 11)

Production

- Ian Broudie – producer
- The Coral – co-producer
- Jon Gray – engineer
- Gary Butler – mastering

Design

- Ian Skelly – sleeve illustrations
- Kevin Power – photography
- Ray Tang – photography
- Lyndsey Smith-Das – photography
- Arthur Janssen – photography
- Jonathan Worth – photography
- Juno – design, layout
- Scott Jonas – machine illustration

== Charts and certifications ==
=== Weekly charts ===
Chart performance for Magic and Medicine
Chart (2003)	Peak position
Belgian Albums (Ultratop Wallonia)	39
French Albums (SNEP)	64
German Albums (Offizielle Top 100)	99
Irish Albums (IRMA)	4
Japanese Albums (Oricon)	69
New Zealand Albums (RMNZ)	43
Norwegian Albums (VG-lista)	20
Scottish Albums (Official Charts)	1
Swedish Albums (Sverigetopplistan)	60
UK Albums (Official Charts)	1

=== Year-end charts ===
Year-end chart performance for Magic and Medicine
Chart (2003)	Position
UK Albums (OCC)	78

=== Certifications ===
Certifications for Magic and Medicine
Region	Certification	Certified units/sales
United Kingdom (BPI)	Gold	100,000^{^}
^{^} Shipments figures based on certification alone.
