= The Coral =

English rock band

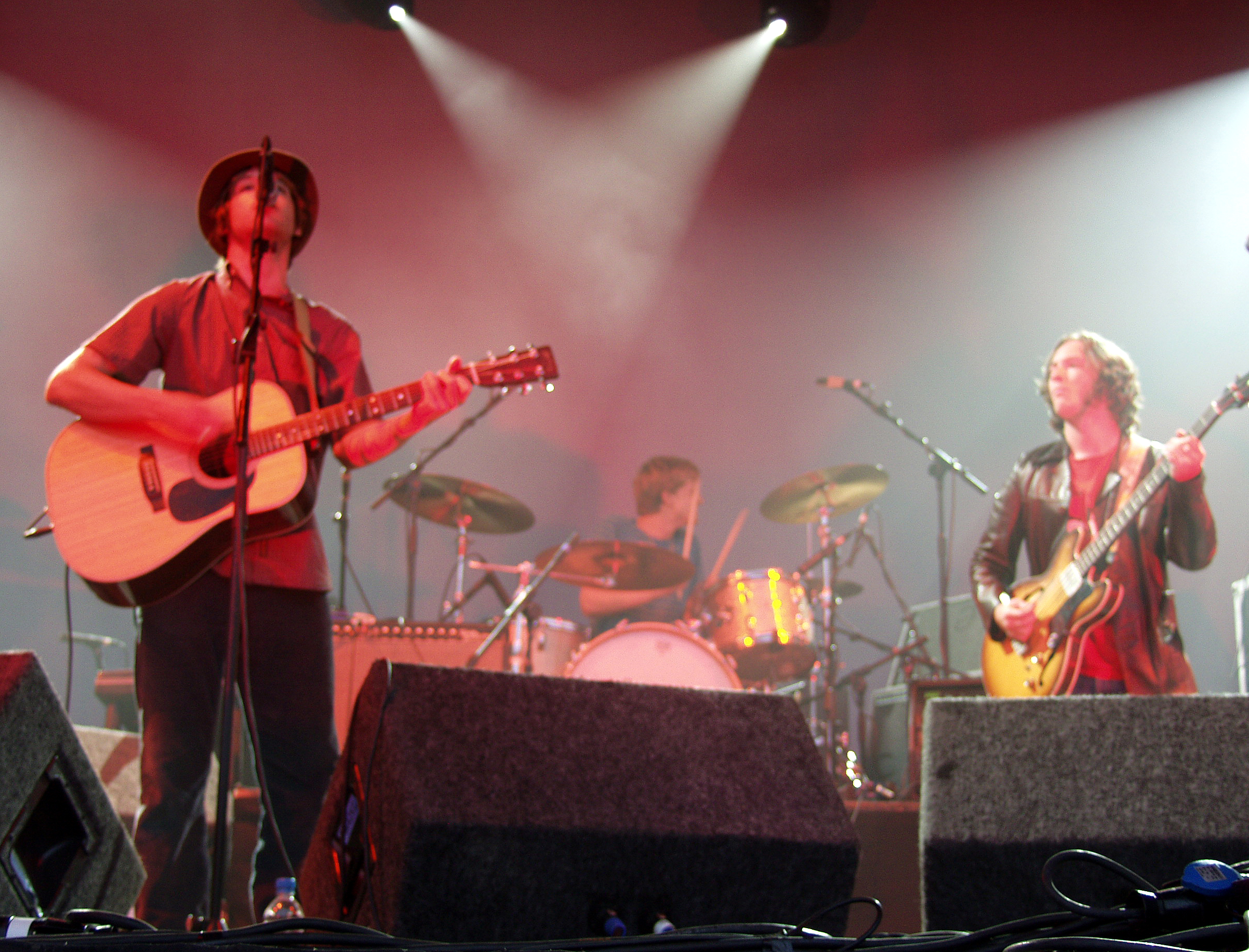
- The Coral performing at the 2003 V Festival. L to R: James Skelly, Ian Skelly and Paul Duffy

Background information
- Origin: Hoylake, Merseyside, England
- Genres: Indie rock; psychedelic folk; neo-psychedelia; jangle pop
- Years active: 1996–present
- Labels: Deltasonic, Skeleton Key
- Members: James Skelly; Paul Duffy; Nick Power; Ian Skelly; Paul Molloy
- Past members: Bill Ryder-Jones; Lee Southall
- Website: thecoral.co.uk

The Coral are an English rock band, formed in 1996 in Hoylake on the Wirral Peninsula, Merseyside. The band emerged during the early 2000s. Their 2002 debut album The Coral, from which came the single "Dreaming of You", was nominated for the Mercury Music Prize and listed as the fourth best album of the year by NME. Their second album, Magic and Medicine (2003), produced four UK Top 20 singles, including "Pass It On". In 2008, after guitarist Bill Ryder-Jones left the band, they continued as a five-piece.

== History ==
=== 1996–2000: Early years and breakthrough ===
In 1996, school-friends Ian Skelly and Paul Duffy began jamming together in the basement of Flat Foot Sams pub in Hoylake. Over the following months they were joined by Bill Ryder-Jones on lead guitar, Ian's older brother James Skelly on vocals and main songwriting duties, and then Lee Southall on rhythm guitar. The band were known briefly as Hive before choosing the name "The Coral", and the line-up was completed with the addition of Nick Power, who joined as keyboard player in 1998. All six original members were attending Hilbre High School when the band formed.

According to Deltasonic head Alan Wills, he first encountered the band from a gig poster they had made of their 'granddads head exploding', and decided to go and see them live. At that point the band had not released any records. When Wills discovered the band he had already started to think about starting a label but had yet to do so, and the Coral gave Wills the impetus to start Deltasonic. Wills told HitQuarters that: "It was always the aim to release them through Deltasonic, and it was always their aim to be on Deltasonic ... Most people wouldn't have understood the Coral at that point". Wills also assumed responsibility for managing the band, albeit reluctantly as he was unable to find anyone else to take on the role.

=== 2001–2004: The Coral and Magic and Medicine ===
Hailed as the first English band of the "guitar group revival", the band's first release was the single "Shadows Fall" (2001), which was followed by two EPs The Oldest Path EP (2001) and Skeleton Key EP (2002). Their eponymous debut album The Coral, released in 2002, reached number five on the UK Albums Chart and was nominated for the Mercury Prize the day after its release. A successful UK tour and festival slots followed along with the singles "Goodbye" reaching number twenty-one in the UK Singles Chart and "Dreaming of You" reaching number thirteen. The single "Dreaming of You" was included in the United States sitcom "Scrubs" episode My Monster for broadcasting and DVD, but eventually taken out again for streaming. The Coral also performed "Dreaming of You" live on Late Night with Conan O'Brien.

After a hectic year they recorded Magic and Medicine in 2003, which reached number one on the UK Albums Chart and garnered critical praise. The album was largely made up of dreamlike acoustic ballads rather than the aggressive psychedelia of their debut. They followed the release with UK, European, American and Japanese tours and a one-off festival Midsummer Nights Scream, held in a big top on the New Brighton promenade. The support for this event included a line up of up-and-coming bands, such as The Libertines, The Zutons and The Thrills. Singles from the album, "Don't Think You're the First", "Pass It On", "Secret Kiss" and "Bill McCai" reached number 10, 5, 25, and 23 respectively on the UK Singles Chart.

Next, the Coral quickly recorded the mini-album Nightfreak and the Sons of Becker. Released in early 2004 with little promotion and no accompanying singles, it was also included as a bonus disc with US versions of Magic and Medicine. Nightfreak and the Sons of Becker marked another change in direction for the band, showcasing a darker, funkier and more lo-fi sound.

=== 2005–2009: The Invisible Invasion and Roots & Echoes ===
In 2004 they began recording The Invisible Invasion, with Portishead's Adrian Utley and Geoff Barrow as producers. On its 2005 release, The Invisible Invasion entered the UK Album Chart at number 3. A second CD containing live versions of songs from this and previous albums was included with early copies. The Coral followed this with UK, European, American and Japanese tours, also releasing "In the Morning" which reached number six and "Something Inside of Me" which reached number forty-one on the UK Singles Chart.

In June 2005 guitarist Bill Ryder-Jones took a break from the band and it was announced that he would not tour again, but might continue to help with future recordings. He was replaced by David McDonnell (later of The Sand Band) for The Invisible Invasion tour. In late 2005 the band had written an album without Bill entitled The Curse of Love, at the beginning of 2006, however, Ryder-Jones was persuaded to rejoin as a full-time band member and the band shelved those songs in order to begin work on another album, Roots & Echoes.

The Coral toured with Arctic Monkeys during their 2007 summer festival gigs, releasing the single "Who's Gonna Find Me" on 30 July 2007 followed by the album Roots & Echoes on 6 August 2007. The band enlisted the help of Matt Potter for percussion and jazz flute on the album. In contrast to their frenetic early material, this album was a much more laid-back affair, and displayed a new-found maturity to the band's songwriting. Tracks such as "Rebecca You" and "Music at Night" were embellished with string arrangements written by Ryder-Jones. They opened the BBC Electric Proms on 24 October 2007 with "Who's Gonna Find Me" and were joined on stage by celebrity friend Noel Gallagher, who played lead guitar on their track "In the Rain".

In January 2008 Ryder-Jones left the Coral, apparently due to experiencing panic attacks before playing live, and finding that his desire to be part of a commercially successful band had disappeared. He has since received great acclaim with an orchestral solo album. In a March 2010 interview, Bill Ryder-Jones said of James Skelly's songwriting: "James was such a brilliant songwriter, still is".

=== 2010–2011: Butterfly House ===
Drawing a line under the first chapter of their career, the Coral released a three-LP and two-CD compilation album Singles Collection on 15 September 2008, featuring all but two of their singles to date. A new single, "Being Somebody Else" was released on 8 September 2008. The album also contained a second CD entitled Mysteries & Rarities which contained 19 previously unreleased songs, demos, outtakes and live recordings of earlier songs.

The Coral released their sixth album Butterfly House on 12 July 2010. The album was produced by John Leckie, of The Stone Roses and Radiohead fame, and was recorded at RAK studios in London as well as Rockfield in South Wales.

Four singles were released from the album, "1000 Years", "More than a Lover", "Walking in the Winter" and "Two Faces". The new songs had been crafted over a two-year span during which the band fine-honed and road-tested the material. The deluxe version of this album came with a bonus CD of five additional songs. Critical reception was largely positive. Record Collector Magazine was notably praiseworthy: "Butterfly House… continues to set the benchmark high. A thing of true wonderment, it's shimmering, beatific multi-coloured coats of guitars and vocal harmonies – think The Everly Brothers, Byrds, Crosby, Stills & Nash – dress songs that primarily concern themselves with the demystification process… this is a genuine contender for 2010 album of the year".

Six months after the release of Butterfly House, the Coral released Butterfly House Acoustic, a limited edition acoustic re-recording of the entire album which they completed in a single day, after positive reviews of their acoustic live performances.

In February 2011, Butterfly House was named UK Album of the Year 2010 at the Music Producers Guild Awards. Robert Plant a fellow MPG nominee for his album with The Band of Joy, carefully scheduled his rehearsal on BBC2's Later With Jools in order to make it to the Coral's performance at the Royal Albert Hall on 15 November 2010.

=== 2012–2017: The Curse of Love and Distance Inbetween ===
In a March 2012 interview, bassist Paul Duffy reported that a new album was in progress at Peter Gabriel's Real World Studios in Bristol, stating that the sound was a lot heavier: "It's very layered, it's like you have one thing and you just keep adding things on top, and it just sounds big cause we've gone in as a six piece". In spring 2012 the band announced an indefinite hiatus in order to concentrate on individual projects. Their half-finished seventh album was shelved.

On 24 August 2014, Geoff Barrow announced when standing in for Stuart Maconie on the BBC Radio 6 Music Freak Zone show that the Coral were to release The Curse of Love in September 2014. The album was recorded around the time of The Invisible Invasion, an album produced by the Portishead and Beak man, but was only recently mastered for release on James Skelly's Skeleton Key label. "Wrapped in Blue" is the first cut from the album, which Barrow played on the show.

On 23 November 2015, the band announced their 2016 return after five-year hiatus. The new studio album, Distance Inbetween was released on 4 March 2016, accompanied by UK and European tours in Spring 2016. Guitarist Paul Molloy joined the band during the recording of the album, replacing Lee Southall who had chosen to take a break from the band in order to focus on his personal life and solo project. In late 2016, the band was joined by Jack Prince as tour percussionist.

=== 2018–2020: Move Through the Dawn ===
In April 2018, the band announced their ninth studio album, Move through the Dawn, which was then released on 10 August 2018. It was recorded at Liverpool's Parr Street Studios and was produced by the band and Rich Turvey.

=== 2021–present: Coral Island ===
On 28 January 2021, The Coral debuted a single, "Faceless Angel", from their fairground-inspired double album Coral Island, which was released on 30 April.

In 2026, they released their 13th album 388, which was released in record stores two weeks in advance of its digital release.

== Musical style and influence ==
Despite the "guitar group revival" tag, they had little in common with their peers. Their music was a hybrid of psychedelia, dub reggae, Merseybeat and country, and their lyrics betrayed an obsession with the sea.

The band's music is a mixture of 1960s-style psychedelia and folk-rock with old-fashioned country and modern indie rock influences.

== Other projects ==
=== Solo albums ===
Drummer Ian Skelly released a solo album, Cut from a Star, on 10 December 2012. He subsequently toured with a 7-piece backing band, The Serpent Power, which included Coral members James Skelly, Paul Duffy and Nick Power. In July 2013 the album was re-released as a deluxe edition double-CD. Following this Ian began working with Paul Molloy under the name Serpent Power, recording an eponymous album released on Skeleton Key Records in May 2015.

Lead singer James Skelly released an album entitled Love Undercover on 3 June 2013 with The Intenders, a band comprising Coral members Ian Skelly, Paul Duffy and Nick Power, as well as members of The Sundowners and Tramp Attack. Tracks such as "Do It Again" unveiled a less abstract dimension to the artist's songwriting style and highlighted the earthy power of Skelly's distinctive vocals. The band toured the UK in June 2013.

Guitarist Lee Southall recorded an album with the singer Molly Jones titled Goodbye to the River that was due for release in 2013 under the name Northern Sky, but the album remains unreleased. In response to fans noting his absence after the Coral announced their new album and tour in November 2015, Southall clarified that he was not involved in the album and tour because he was busy working on a solo project, stating that "it's where my focus has to be right now". Ian Skelly noted that Southall's recent fatherhood also influenced his decision to take a break from the band, and that he wanted to return once he was done with his solo record.

Bassist Paul Duffy is working on a project in collaboration with Eva Petersen, to soundtrack the animation "Lunar Lament of a Haunted Heart" by John Davide. He has also provided the soundtrack for a short film by Jade Mortimer, titled Risen.

Keyboard player Nick Power has published "Small Town Chase", a book of lyrics and poetry. He has also written and performed with The Lost Brothers on the 2014 album 'New Songs of Dawn and Dust'. Power contributed two songs, one of which was 'Hotel Loneliness'. Power's second collection 'Holy Nowhere' was released on 5 December 2015. Power released an album Throat with Mark McKowski in 2024.

=== Skeleton Key Records ===
Skeleton Key Records was founded as a Liverpool-based independent record label in 2013 by James, Ian and Neville Skelly. The label evolved out of Neville's earlier label Watertown Records, on which he had released his own material. James Skelly & the Intenders' Love Undercover (2013) was the first album released by the label, followed by the two-CD deluxe edition of Ian Skelly's Cut from a Star. Artists signed to the label include James Skelly & the Intenders, Ian Skelly, Neville Skelly, Serpent Power, The Sundowners, Cut Glass Kings, Marvin Powell, She Drew the Gun and the Mysterines.

=== Filmography ===
- The Coral Mini Movie (2002)
- The Curry Files (2003)
- The Coral Film (2008)
- Dreaming of You: The Making of the Coral (2025)

== Personnel ==
=== Current members ===
- James Skelly – lead vocals, guitar, percussion (1996–present)
- Paul Duffy – bass, saxophone, backing vocals (1996–present)
- Nick Power – keyboards (2000-present), organ (2000-present), melodica, harmonica (2003-2011), piano (2003), electric piano (2003-present), co lead vocals (1998-2000), backing vocals (1998-2011)
- Ian Skelly – drums (1996–present), backing and occasional lead vocals (2008–present)
- Paul Molloy – guitar, occasional lead vocals (2015–present)

=== Current touring musicians ===
- Zak McDonnell – percussion (2021–present)
- Danny Murphy – guitar (2021–present)

=== Former members ===
- Bill Ryder-Jones – guitar, bass, trumpet (1996–2005, 2006–2008)
- Lee Southall – guitar, backing and occasional lead vocals (1996–2015)

=== Former touring musicians ===
- David McDonnell – guitar (2005)
- John Duffy – percussion, backing vocals (2003–2005)
- Jack Prince – percussion (2016–2021)

== Discography ==
=== Studio albums ===
- The Coral (2002)
- Magic and Medicine (2003)
- Nightfreak and the Sons of Becker (2004)
- The Invisible Invasion (2005)
- Roots & Echoes (2007)
- Butterfly House (2010)
- The Curse of Love (2014)
- Distance Inbetween (2016)
- Move Through the Dawn (2018)
- Coral Island (2021)
- Sea of Mirrors (2023)
- Holy Joe's Coral Island Medicine Show (2023)
- 388 (2026)

== Tours ==
- Debut UK Tour (November 2001)
- The Coral Tour (2002)
- Magic and Medicine Tour (2003–2004)
- The Invisible Invasion Tour (2005)
- Roots & Echoes Tour (2007)
- The Singles Collection Tour (2008)
- Butterfly House Tour (2010–2011)
- Distance Inbetween Tour (2016)
- THE CORAL - 20th Anniversary Tour (2022)

=== As support act ===
- NME Carling Awards Tour (January–February 2002)
- Supergrass: Life on Other Planets Tour (March 2003)
- Blur: Think Tank Tour (October 2003)
- Oasis: Don't Believe the Truth Tour (2005)
- Arctic Monkeys: Favourite Worst Nightmare Tour (July 2007)
- Manic Street Preachers: Resistance Is Futile Tour (April–May 2018)
