= Deltasonic =

UK record label

- Founder: Alan Wills
- Country of origin: United Kingdom
- Location: Liverpool, England
- Official website: deltasonicrecords.co.uk

Deltasonic is a British record label based in Liverpool, England. Previously joint ventured with Sony Music, it is now independent. It was formed by Alan Wills, the former drummer with Liverpool bands Shack and Top, and associated with the 'cosmic Scouse' and 'scallydelica' music scenes.

== History ==
Aiming to be like Mo'Wax, Wills started his first label EVA in January 2000, primarily to release material by Joe Fearon a.k.a. Paracruzar. However, after three promo-only releases on clear 10-inch vinyl, including the first release by 'Mountaineers' (credited on the record as 'The Sandpeople'), he decided to move on to new areas and, with the help of his partner Ann Heston and consultancy from Simon Duffy (Tri Tone), he started a new label called Deltasonic Records. The name is an amalgamation of two ideas, as Wills explains: "I predominantly wanted it to be a guitar label and the guitars we liked are rooted in the blues, so Delta, and Sonic is from Sonic Youth, just the coolest band name ever."

The discovery of the Coral gave Wills the impetus to bring his idea of a new guitar-band label to life by starting Deltasonic. Wills told HitQuarters that: "It was always the aim to release them through Deltasonic, and it was always their aim to be on Deltasonic ... Most people wouldn't have understood the Coral at that point."

The label originally had a joint venture deal with Sony, with the major record company owning 49% of Deltasonic and using its network to distribute and market it releases worldwide. The partnership was a gamble for Sony that was motivated by chairman Rob Stringer and president Muff Winwood's love of the label's roster, and their belief that guitar music was on the rise.

The first single released was by the Coral. Other bands later signed to the label include Mountaineers (who later moved on to Mute records), the Zutons, the Dead 60's, the Little Flames, the Rascals, the Basement, Candie Payne, and their first long-term signing from outside Liverpool, the Longcut followed by the Suzukis.

Deltasonic is also a publishing company, and had success in 2009 with Miles Kane, and the Last Shadow Puppets' #1 album, The Age of the Understatement.

As a fully independent record label, Deltasonic's first album release for 2010 was by the Suzukis.

In May 2014, Alan Wills was killed in a cycling accident at the age of 52. The label however, would still continue.

Deltasonic has continued and focuses on managing and developing new artists. With Ann Heston at the helm assisted by a team of young upcoming managers, and Joe Fearon as A&R consultant, Deltasonic re-emerged as one of the key independent UK labels and one of the few who develop young artists from ground level. 2015 saw the release of the debut album from The Little Flames and a series of reissues from the Deltasonic catalogue including the Dead 60s, Candie Payne, and the Basement. 2016 had releases from the latest Deltasonic artists; the Vryll Society, Hidden Charms, Psycho Comedy, and Tom Low.

== Artists ==
- Danny Connors
- The Basement
- The Dead 60s
- Candie Payne
- The Coral
- The Little Flames
- The Longcut
- The Rascals
- Mountaineers
- Sunstack Jones
- The Sand Band
- The Suzukis
- The Tigerpicks
- The Zutons
- The Dirty Rivers
- Hidden Charms
- The Vryll Society
- Tom Low
- Psycho Comedy

== See also ==
- Lists of record labels
