= The Lightning Seeds discography =

Rock group discography

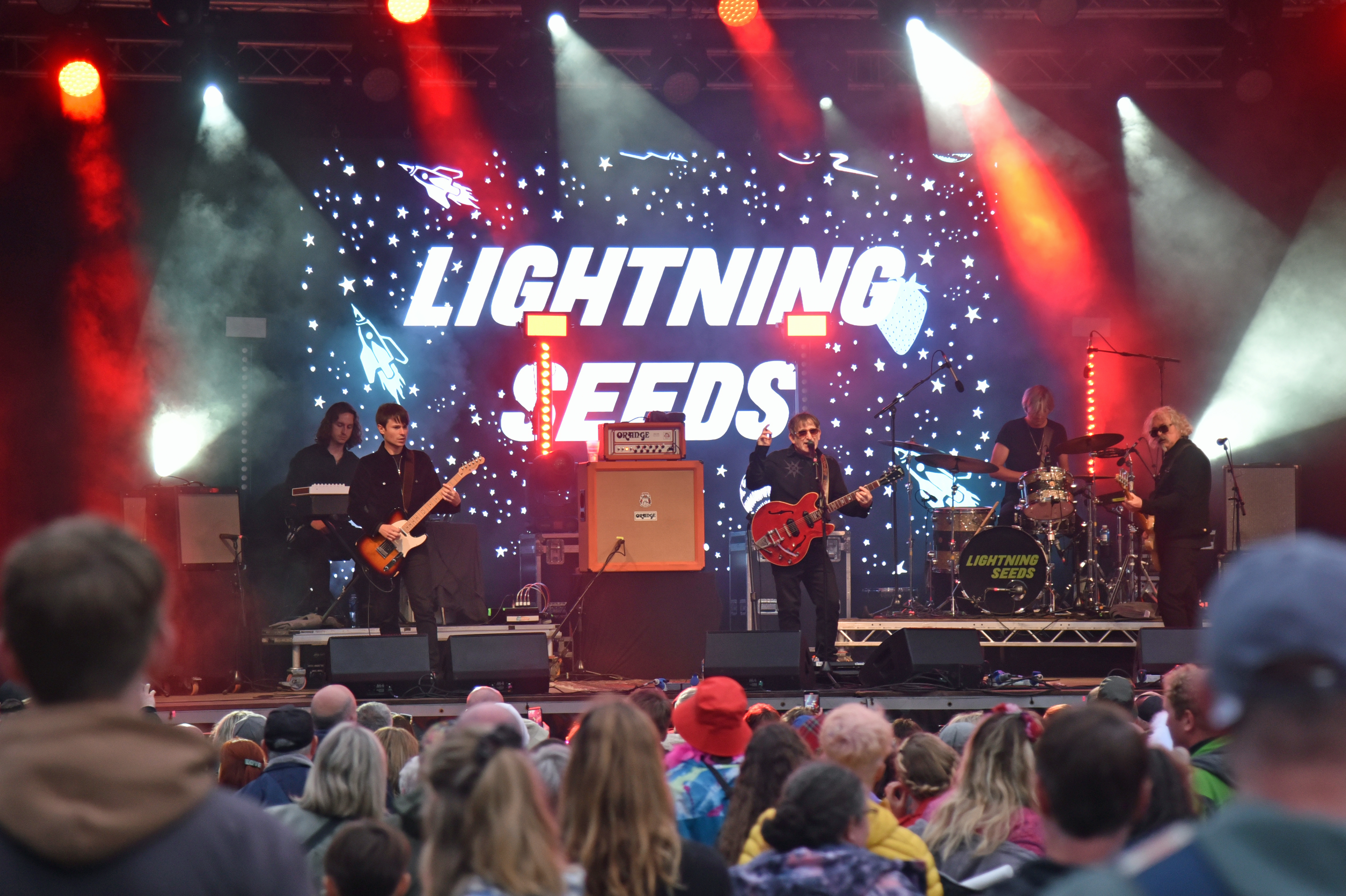
- The Lightning Seeds in 2025
- Studio albums: 7
- Compilation albums: 4
- Singles: 25
- Music videos: 23

The following is the discography of rock group The Lightning Seeds.

== Albums ==
=== Studio albums ===
List of studio albums, with selected chart positions and certifications
| Title | Album details | Peak chart positions | | | | Certifications |
| Title | Album details | UK | AUS | NZ | US | Certifications |
|---|---|---|---|---|---|---|
| Cloudcuckooland | Released: 29 January 1990; Label: Ghetto, MCA (US/Canada); Formats: CD, LP, cassette | 50 | 143 | — | 46 | |
| Sense | Released: 6 April 1992; Label: Virgin, MCA (US/Canada); Formats: CD, LP, cassette | 53 | 83 | 50 | 154 | BPI: Silver |
| Jollification | Released: 5 September 1994; Label: Epic; Formats: CD, LP, cassette | 12 | 141 | — | — | BPI: Platinum |
| Dizzy Heights | Released: 11 November 1996; Label: Epic; Formats: CD, cassette, Mini-Disc | 11 | 151 | — | — | BPI: Gold |
| Tilt | Released: 22 November 1999; Label: Epic; Formats: CD, LP, cassette, MD | 46 | — | — | — | |
| Four Winds | Released: 18 May 2009; Label: Universal; Formats: CD, digital download | 67 | — | — | — | |
| See You in the Stars | Released: 14 October 2022; Label: BMG; Formats: CD, LP, digital download | 16 | — | — | — | |
"—" denotes a recording that did not chart or was not released in that territory.

=== Compilation albums ===
List of compilation albums, with selected chart positions and certifications
| Title | Album details | Peak chart positions | | Certifications |
| Title | Album details | UK | AUS | Certifications |
|---|---|---|---|---|
| Pure | Released: 6 May 1996; Label: Virgin; Formats: CD, cassette | 27 | — | BPI: Silver |
| Like You Do... Best of The Lightning Seeds | Released: 10 November 1997; Label: Epic; Formats: CD, MD, cassette, VHS (PAL) | 5 | 188 | BPI: 2× Platinum |
| Life of Riley: The Lightning Seeds Collection | Released: 11 August 2003; Label: EMI Gold; Formats: CD, digital download | — | — | |
| The Very Best of The Lightning Seeds | Released: 12 June 2006; Label: Sony BMG; Formats: CD, digital download | 33 | — | |
| Tomorrow's Here Today 35 Years Of | Released: 4 October 2024; Label: Sony BMG; Formats: CD, 2LP | - | — | |
"—" denotes a recording that did not chart or was not released in that territory.

== Singles ==
List of singles, with selected chart positions and certifications, showing year released and album name
| Title | Year | Peak chart positions | | | | | | | | | | Certifications | Album |
| Title | Year | UK | AUS | CAN | GER | IRL | NOR | NZ | SWI | US | US Alt. | Certifications | Album |
|---|---|---|---|---|---|---|---|---|---|---|---|---|---|
| "Pure" | 1989 | 16 | 92 | 70 | — | — | — | — | — | 31 | 8 | BPI: Silver | Cloudcuckooland |
| "Joy" | 1989 | — | — | — | — | — | — | — | — | — | — | | Cloudcuckooland |
| "All I Want" | 1990 | — | 170 | — | — | — | — | — | — | — | 9 | | Cloudcuckooland |
| "Sweet Dreams" | 1990 | — | — | — | — | — | — | — | — | — | — | | Cloudcuckooland |
| "The Life of Riley" | 1992 | 28 | 98 | 65 | 52 | — | — | 15 | — | 98 | 2 | | Sense |
| "Sense" | 1992 | 31 | 107 | — | — | — | — | 39 | — | — | — | | Sense |
| "Blowing Bubbles" | 1992 | — | — | — | — | — | — | — | — | — | 19 | | Sense |
| "Lucky You" | 1994 | 43 | 132 | — | 60 | — | — | — | — | — | 38 | | Jollification |
| "Change" | 1995 | 13 | — | — | 74 | — | — | — | — | — | — | | Jollification |
| "Marvellous" | 1995 | 24 | — | — | 80 | — | — | — | — | — | — | | Jollification |
| "Perfect" | 1995 | 18 | — | — | — | — | — | — | — | — | — | | Jollification |
| "Lucky You" (UK re-release) | 1995 | 15 | — | — | — | — | — | — | — | — | — | | Jollification |
| "Ready or Not" | 1996 | 20 | — | — | — | — | — | — | — | — | — | | Dizzy Heights |
| "Three Lions" (with David Baddiel and Frank Skinner) | 1996 | 1 | — | — | 49 | 9 | 7 | — | 44 | — | — | BPI: 2× Platinum | The Beautiful Game |
| "What If..." | 1996 | 14 | — | — | 77 | — | — | — | — | — | — | | Dizzy Heights |
| "Sugar Coated Iceberg" | 1997 | 12 | — | — | 76 | — | — | — | — | — | — | | Dizzy Heights |
| "You Showed Me" | 1997 | 8 | 217 | — | — | — | — | — | — | — | — | | Dizzy Heights |
| "What You Say" | 1997 | 41 | — | — | — | — | — | — | — | — | — | | Like You Do... Best of The Lightning Seeds |
| "Three Lions '98" (with David Baddiel and Frank Skinner) | 1998 | 1 | — | — | 14 | 14 | 5 | — | — | — | — | BPI: Platinum | Non-album single |
| "Life's Too Short" | 1999 | 27 | — | — | — | — | — | — | — | — | — | | Tilt |
| "Sweetest Soul Sensations" | 2000 | 67 | — | — | — | — | — | — | — | — | — | | Tilt |
| "Song for No One" | 2006 | — | — | — | — | — | — | — | — | — | — | | The Very Best of the Lightning Seeds |
| "Ghosts" | 2009 | — | — | — | — | — | — | — | — | — | — | | Four Winds |
| "Don't Walk on By" | 2009 | — | — | — | — | — | — | — | — | — | — | | Four Winds |
| "Three Lions" (with David Baddiel and Frank Skinner) re-entry | 2018 | 1 | — | — | — | 65 | — | — | — | — | — | | The Beautiful Game |
| "Sunshine" | 2022 | — | — | — | — | — | — | — | — | — | — | | See You in the Stars |
| "Three Lions (It's Coming Home for Christmas)" (with David Baddiel and Frank Skinner) | 2022 | 20 | — | — | — | — | — | — | — | — | — | | |
"—" denotes a recording that did not chart or was not released in that territory.

== Music videos ==
| Album | Title | Director |
|---|---|---|
| Cloudcuckooland | "Pure (UK Version)" | |
| Cloudcuckooland | "Pure (US Version)" | |
| Cloudcuckooland | "Joy" | |
| Cloudcuckooland | "All I Want (UK Version)" | |
| Cloudcuckooland | "All I Want (US Version)" | |
| Sense | "The Life of Riley" | |
| Sense | "Sense" | |
| Jollification | "Lucky You (1994)" | |
| Jollification | "Change" | Pedro Romhanyi |
| Jollification | "Marvellous" | |
| Jollification | "Perfect" | |
| Jollification | "Lucky You (1995)" | |
| Dizzy Heights | "Ready Or Not" | |
| Dizzy Heights | "Ready Or Not (Colour Version)" | |
| | "Three Lions" | Pedro Romhanyi |
| Dizzy Heights | "What If" | Sophie Muller |
| Dizzy Heights | "Sugar Coated Iceberg" | Jamie Thraves |
| Dizzy Heights | "You Showed Me" | Pedro Romhanyi |
| Like You Do | "What You Say" | Lindy Heymann |
| | "Three Lions (1998)" | Pedro Romhanyi |
| Tilt | "Life's Too Short" | Earle Sebastian |
| Tilt | "Sweetest Soul Sensations" | |
| Four Winds | "Ghosts" | |
