= The Very Best of The Lightning Seeds =

Greatest hits album by The Lightning Seeds
- Released: 12 June 2006
- Recorded: 1989–2006
- Genre: Alternative rock, indie pop
- Length: 78:39
- Label: Sony BMG (684800)
- Producer: Ian Broudie

The Lightning Seeds chronology
Life of Riley: The Lightning Seeds Collection (2003)	The Very Best of The Lightning Seeds (2006)	Four Winds (2009)

Singles from The Very Best of the Lightning Seeds
- 1. "Three Lions" Released: 5 June 2006 (reissue); 2. "Song for No One" Released: 26 June 2006

Professional ratings
Review scores
Source	Rating
Allmusic	3/5 stars

The Very Best of The Lightning Seeds is the second official greatest hits album by British alternative rock band The Lightning Seeds. It was released on 12 June 2006, peaking at number 33 on the UK Album Chart.

The compilation is essentially an update of the group's first greatest hits album 1997's Like You Do... Best of The Lightning Seeds. The compilations share 12 tracks between them. The Very Best drops the group's third single "All I Want" and replaces the original recording of "Three Lions" with the 1998 re-recording. The compilation includes a pair of b-side covers ("Be My Baby", "Lucifer Sam"), two songs from 1998's commercial failure Tilt, "Song for No One" - a remix of a song from Broudie's solo-album - and the new recording "Tables Have Turned".

== Track listing ==
All tracks are written by Ian Broudie; except where indicated

No.	Title	Writer(s)	Original album/single	Length
1.	"Lucky You"	Broudie, Terry Hall	Jollification	4:19
2.	"The Life of Riley"		Sense	4:03
3.	"Change"		Jollification	4:00
4.	"Feeling Lazy"	Broudie, Ian McNabb	Jollification	3:55
5.	"Life's Too Short"		Tilt	4:00
6.	"Pure"		Cloudcuckooland	3:48
7.	"Song for No One" (new remixed version)		Tales Told	2:54
8.	"You Showed Me"	Gene Clark, James McGuinn	Dizzy Heights	4:07
9.	"Be My Baby"	Ellie Greenwich, Jeff Barry, Phil Spector	"What You Say" (b-side)	3:44
10.	"Sugar Coated Iceberg"	Broudie, Stephen Jones	Dizzy Heights	3:50
11.	"Ready or Not"		Dizzy Heights	3:47
12.	"Lucifer Sam"	Syd Barrett	"Marvellous" (b-side)	3:05
13.	"What If..."	Broudie, Hall	Dizzy Heights	3:22
14.	"If Only"	Broudie, Mike Pickering	Tilt	4:53
15.	"Perfect"		Jollification	3:28
16.	"What You Say"	Broudie, Hall	Like You Do... Best of The Lightning Seeds	4:23
17.	"Tables Have Turned"		previously unreleased	3:24
18.	"Sense"	Broudie, Hall	Sense	4:06
19.	"Marvellous"		Jollification	5:33
20.	"Three Lions '98"	David Baddiel (lyrics), Frank Skinner (lyrics), Broudie (music)	non-album single	3:58

== Charts ==
Chart (2006)	Peak position
UK Albums Chart	33
