= Pure (The Lightning Seeds album) =

Compilation album by The Lightning Seeds
- Released: 6 May 1996
- Recorded: 1989–1991
- Genre: Alternative rock, pop
- Length: 71:49
- Label: Virgin (CDV 2805)
- Producer: Ian Broudie

The Lightning Seeds chronology
Jollification (1994)	Pure (1996)	Dizzy Heights (1996)

Professional ratings
Review scores
Source	Rating
Allmusic	4/5 stars

Pure is a compilation album by pop band The Lightning Seeds, released in 1996 and reaching #27 in the UK Albums Chart.

The first of what would turn out to be five compilations Ian Broudie released from 1996 to 2006, Pure, The Lightning Seeds' first release by Virgin, is almost a reissue rather than a compilation, since it consists of all but three of the songs released by Epic on the first two albums, Cloudcuckooland from 1990 and Sense from 1992; the only songs missing are one song from the first album ("Control the Flame") and two from Sense: ("Where Flowers Fade" and "Marooned").

== Track listing ==
All tracks are written by Ian Broudie; except where indicated.

No.	Title	Writer(s)	Length
1.	"The Life of Riley"		4:03
2.	"Sense"	Broudie, Terry Hall	4:11
3.	"Blowing Bubbles"		4:13
4.	"Pure"		3:47
5.	"Sweet Dreams"	Broudie, Richard Jobson	4:27
6.	"All I Want"	Broudie, Peter Coyle	2:54
7.	"A Small Slice of Heaven"	Broudie, Hall	3:48
8.	"Love Explosion"		4:16
9.	"Don't Let Go"		3:58
10.	"Joy"		4:16
11.	"The Price"		4:17
12.	"A Cool Place"		2:56
13.	"Happy"	Broudie, Ian McNabb	4:30
14.	"Tingle Tangle"		3:21
15.	"God Help Them"	Broudie, Paul Simpson	3:43
16.	"Bound in a Nutshell"		4:32
17.	"The Nearly Man"		3:08
18.	"Thinking Up, Looking Down"		5:19

- Tracks 1, 2, 3, 7, 12, 13, 14, 18 from Sense
- Tracks 4, 5, 6, 8, 9, 10, 11, 15, 16, 17 from Cloudcuckooland

== Charts ==
Chart (1996)	Peak position
UK Albums Chart	27

== Certifications ==
- United Kingdom (BPI): Silver (1 January 1997)
