= Like You Do... Best of The Lightning Seeds =

Greatest hits album by The Lightning Seeds
- Released: 10 November 1997
- Recorded: 1989–1997
- Genre: Alternative rock; Britpop; indie pop
- Length: 63:17
- Label: Epic (489034)
- Producer: Ian Broudie; Jonathan Quarmby; Kevin Bacon

The Lightning Seeds chronology
Dizzy Heights (1996)	Like You Do... Best of The Lightning Seeds (1997)	Tilt (1999)

Singles from Like You Do... Best of The Lightning Seeds
- 1. "What You Say" Released: 1 December 1997

Professional ratings
Review scores
Source	Rating
AllMusic	4.5/5 stars
Music Week	4/5 stars
NME	8/10 stars
Uncut	5/5 stars

Like You Do... Best of The Lightning Seeds is the first greatest hits album by English alternative rock band The Lightning Seeds, released on 10 November 1997. The album includes the band's singles from 1989 up until the album's release, plus two previously unreleased tracks and one new version of a song from a previous studio album. "What You Say" was released as a single from the album in December 1997 and peaked at number 41 on the UK Singles Chart. The album is named after a song on Dizzy Heights, but which does not appear this album.

== Track listing ==
All tracks are written by Ian Broudie; Except where indicated.

No.	Title	Writer(s)	Original album	Length
1.	"What You Say"	Broudie, Terry Hall	Previously unreleased	4:26
2.	"The Life of Riley"		Sense 1992	4:03
3.	"Lucky You"	Broudie, Hall	Jollification 1994	4:21
4.	"You Showed Me"	Gene Clark, James McGuinn	Dizzy Heights 1996	4:09
5.	"Change" (7" radio edit)		Jollification	3:40
6.	"Waiting for Today to Happen" (1997 version)	Broudie, Nicky Jones	Original version on Dizzy Heights	3:53
7.	"Pure"		Cloudcuckooland 1989	3:48
8.	"Sugar Coated Iceberg"	Broudie, Stephen Jones	Dizzy Heights	3:53
9.	"Ready or Not"		Dizzy Heights	3:50
10.	"All I Want"	Broudie, Peter Coyle	Cloudcuckooland	2:54
11.	"Perfect"		Jollification	3:30
12.	"What If..."	Broudie, Hall	Dizzy Heights	3:23
13.	"Sense"	Broudie, Hall	Sense	4:07
14.	"Brain Drain"		Previously unreleased	3:52
15.	"Marvellous"		Jollification	5:44
16.	"Three Lions"	David Baddiel (Lyrics), Frank Skinner (Lyrics), Broudie (Music)	The Beautiful Game	3:44

== Charts and certifications ==
=== Weekly charts ===
Chart (1997–1998)	Peak position
Australian Albums (ARIA)	188
UK Albums (OCC)	5

=== Year-end charts ===
Chart (1997)	Position
UK Albums (OCC)	22
Chart (1998)	Position
UK Albums (OCC)	64

=== Certifications ===
Region	Certification	Certified units/sales
United Kingdom (BPI)	2× Platinum	600,000^{^}
^{^} Shipments figures based on certification alone.
