= Life of Riley: The Lightning Seeds Collection =

Compilation album by The Lightning Seeds
- Released: 11 August 2003
- Recorded: 1989–1992
- Genre: Alternative rock, indie pop
- Length: 48:03
- Label: EMI Gold (591570)

The Lightning Seeds chronology
Tilt (1999)	Life of Riley: The Lightning Seeds Collection (2003)	The Very Best of The Lightning Seeds (2006)

Professional ratings
Review scores
Source	Rating
Allmusic	2.5/5 stars

Life of Riley: The Lightning Seeds Collection is the second compilation by British alternative rock band The Lightning Seeds. The music is taken from The Lightning Seeds releases between 1989 and 1992. It consists largely of non-album B-sides, along with a few album tracks and two versions of the band's hit single "The Life Of Riley".

== Track listing ==
No.	Title	Writer(s)	Original album/single	Length
1.	"The Life of Riley"	Ian Broudie	Sense	4:04
2.	"Sense"	Broudie, Terry Hall	Sense	4:09
3.	"Fools"	Broudie	B-side of "Pure"	4:09
4.	"Frenzy"	Broudie	B-side of "Joy"	3:57
5.	"Control the Flame"	Broudie, Peter Coyle	B-side of "Joy"	3:24
6.	"Hang on to a Dream"	Tim Hardin	B-side of "Sweet Dreams"	2:23
7.	"Persuasion"	Broudie, Ian McCulloch	B-side of "All I Want"	4:54
8.	"Something in the Air"	John Keen	B-side of "The Life of Riley"	3:37
9.	"Where Flowers Fade"	Broudie, Hall	Sense	5:01
10.	"Marooned"	Broudie	B-side of "The Life of Riley"	4:40
11.	"Flaming Sword"	Broudie, Paul Simpson	B-side of "Sweet Dreams"	3:13
12.	"The Life of Riley (Remix)"	Broudie	B-side of "Sense"	6:58

Notes

- "Fools" and "Frenzy" also appear on the US edition of Cloudcuckooland.
- "Control the Flame" also appears on Cloudcuckooland.
- "Marooned" also appears on Sense.
