= Tilt (The Lightning Seeds album) =

Studio album by The Lightning Seeds
- Released: 22 November 1999
- Recorded: 1999
- Genre: Alternative dance; electronica; dance-pop; alternative rock
- Length: 44:03
- Label: Epic (496263)
- Producer: Ian Broudie; Simon Rogers; Tim Simenon; Cutfather & Joe

The Lightning Seeds chronology
Like You Do... (1997)	Tilt (1999)	Life of Riley (2003)

Singles from Tilt
- 1. "Life's Too Short" Released: 15 November 1999; 2. "Sweetest Soul Sensations" Released: 6 March 2000

Tilt is the fifth studio album from British alternative rock band The Lightning Seeds. It was released in 1999.

After The Lightning Seeds had become a full band in 1996 with the release of the hugely successful single "Three Lions" and the album Dizzy Heights that November, numerous members left the band whilst Zak Starkey joined the group on drums in time for their successful greatest hits album Like You Do... Best of The Lightning Seeds (1997). The band's successes alienated band leader Ian Broudie, who preferred being an "outsider more than a safe bet". Looking to stir the group in a new direction, he co-wrote material with Terry Hall, Steven Jones and Mark Cullen for Tilt.

A departure from the indie rock sound the group had established, Tilt instead explores electronica and dance music. The band had predominantly recorded Tilt with electronic producer Simon Rogers, as well as working with Bomb the Bass member Tim Simenon and Cutfather & Joe on some material. Numerous critics saw Tilt as an attempt from Broudie to modernize the band's sound. The lyrics on the album were less optimistic than they had been in the band's previous work, focusing on subjects such as the Liverpool dockers' strike, self-loathing pop stars and general disillusionment.

Preceded in release a week by the single "Life's Too Short", Tilt was released by Epic Records in November 1999. A unique billboard campaign was developed to promote the album. The album was a commercial failure, only reaching number 46 on the UK Albums Chart. Its two singles also fared badly in the UK Singles Chart. Broudie was later unsatisfied with the album, and took the band on hiatus in 2000.

== Background and recording ==
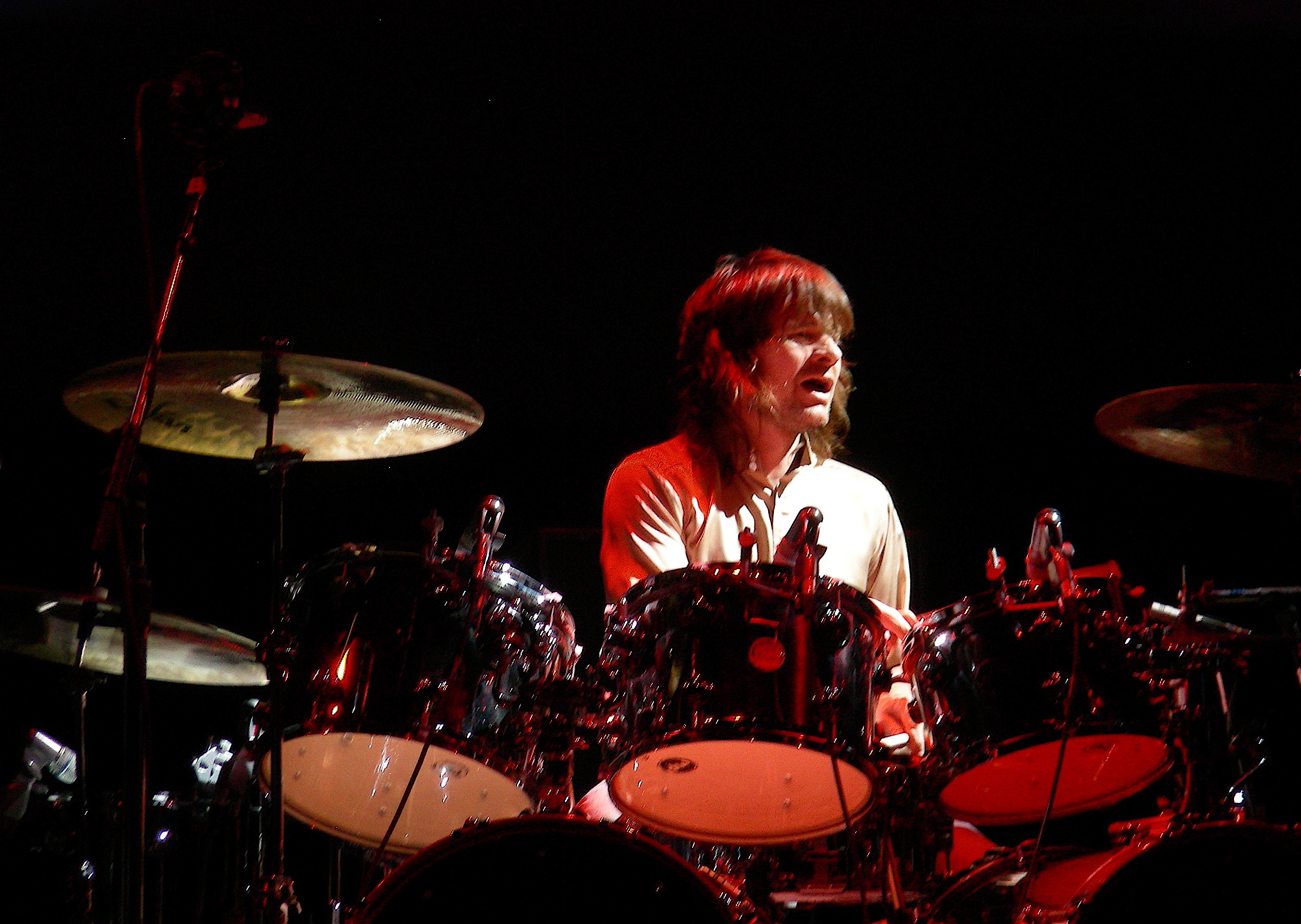
Tilt was the band's only album with Zak Starkey (pictured in 2008).

After the Lightning Seeds had been a solo project for Ian Broudie, the project became a full band in 1996 and became a household name with the huge success of their single "Three Lions", the official England football team single of UEFA Euro 1996. "Three Lions" was written and recorded with football television presenters Frank Skinner and David Baddiel for the football tournament's official various artists album The Beautiful Game and spent three non-consecutive weeks at number one in the UK Singles Chart. The band followed it with the album Dizzy Heights in November 1996, a critical and commercial success. The band's success in 1996 alienated Broudie, who later stated "I didn't really enjoy that whole period. I'm used to being the outsider more than a safe bet." Angie Pollock had already joined the group on piano and keyboards, replacing Ali Kane, whilst drummer Chris Sharrock left to work with World Party on their album Egyptology (1997). Zak Starkey, son of Ringo Starr, replaced him later that year. The band released a greatest hits album in November 1997, Like You Do... Best of The Lightning Seeds, which became the band's biggest-selling album, reaching number 5 on the UK Album Chart and later being certified double Platinum by the British Phonographic Industry, whilst a re-recorded version of "Three Lions" with alternative lyrics, "3 Lions 98", reached number 1 in the UK Singles Chart. Guitarist Paul Hemmings left the band in 1998, with Broudie taking over his guitar duties.

Beginning work on a new album at the end of 1998, Broudie co-wrote songs with several of his old friends, namely Terry Hall of the Specials and Steven Jones from Babybird, whilst several songs were co-written by Broudie with Mark Cullen of Fixed Stars. The album, named Tilt, was produced by Simon Rogers with the exception of the seventh track "Get it Right", which was produced and mixed by Bomb the Bass member Tim Simenon who also helped with the dance beats throughout the album. Production duo Cutfather & Joe are also credited with additional production on the album and for remixing "Sweetest Soul Sensations". Cenzo Townshend, John Grey, Kenny Patterson and Mads Nilsson all engineered the album, whilst in the liner notes of Tilt, Joe Belmaati gets extra credit for programming work and Dave Bascombe for mixing the album.

== Music ==
Departing from the group's indie rock sound, Tilt explores electronica and dance music, and features hard dance beats. Music writer Colin Larkin and Jason Ankeny of AllMusic saw Tilt as Broudie's attempt to modernize the band's sound. According to Jason Damas, also of AllMusic, although "Ian Broudie is probably one of the least likely people to embrace electronica," Tilt brings some of the band's "dancier undertones" to the forefront. He also noted that the band were "no strangers to stiff, computerized beats" because Broudie had used a drum machine to round out the Lightning Seeds' sound when it was still a solo project prior to 1996, and said that, as such, Tilt "is neither electronica or rock, but merely danceable pop" and said it was "hardly a real reach for them," referring to it as "a less-dated version" of the band's debut album Cloudcuckooland (1990). Tilt was also said to occasionally show the band sounding like "a warmer version of the Pet Shop Boys." Music journalist Colin Larkin said the closest point of reference on Tilt is "arguably" New Order. Pop Rescue said that the dance sounds that "emerged in full" on Tilt had first emerged to a lesser extent on the band's third album Jollification (1994).

"For his part, Broudie has served a rich, substantial meal instead of his usual bittersweet 'n' lo tablets."

— Nicholas Broudie of The Independent.

Broudie's lyrics on the album were noted for being less optimistic than they had been before, and according to Nicholas Barber of The Independent, "Broudie sounds as if he was miserable during the making of Tilt," noting that "rather than insisting that "things could be marvellous," Broudie grouches about the fate of Liverpool's dockers ("Not a word in the morning papers/ The unions and prayers won't save us"), about self-loathing pop stars ("I've been caring less and less/ Since my overnight success") and about general disillusionment ("I expected fireworks/ I expected changes")." Some of the lyrics contributed by Hall, Pickering and Jones were also described as poignant and heavyweight.

"Life's Too Short" is an uptempo song described by Rob Bolton of Exclaim as possessing a "club anthem" sound. "Crowdpleaser" is a "techno-rocker". "If Only" and "Happy Satellite" were described by one critics as especially sounding like "a warmer version of the Pet Shop boys". "Sweetest Soul Sensations" samples Al Green. Describing "I Wish I was in Love," Britpop News, although calling Tilt an "electronic spree album," noted that "they didn’t forget to put an element of flowing song full of melodic synth combined with Ian Broudie’s made layered voice."

== Release and promotion ==
Tilt was released by Epic Records on 22 November 1999 in the UK, Europe, Malaysia and Japan. The album was predominantly released on CD, although it was (along with Dizzy Heights and Like You Do... Best of The Lightning Seeds) one of the few albums by the band issued on Mini Disc, and a limited edition numbered promotional LP was also distributed. Two singles were released from the album which were available in the UK as a pair of CD singles with different B-sides and as promotional remix twelve-inch singles–opening song "Life's Too Short" was released as the first single a week before the album on 15 November 1999, introducing listeners to the band's new more dance-orientated sound. The song was heralded by BBC Radio 1 DJ Chris Moyles as "one of the band's strongest singles to date" and featured a remix of the song by ATFC as a B-side. The second and final single, "Sweet Soul Sensations", was released on 6 March 2000, which featured a remix of "Life's Too Short" by Mercury Rev.

Market researcher Eleanor Trickett chose Sony Music's unusual outdoor advertising campaign for Tilt, although, as she stressed to Campaign Live, she was not a fan of the band, and said that "this campaign grabs the attention far more". Given the brief by Sony Music to "launch the Lightning Seeds’ new album, Tilt, in an engaging and cost-effective manner above and beyond the existing 4-sheet campaign," Trickett explained that "using [her] favourite outdoor idea–things that go wrong with poster sites–these ads grab the attention, by making the punter think that something's gone disastrously pear-shaped [...] the album is called Tilt, and the very ordinary creative treatment springs to life by the amusingly literal interpretation." Such medium required 48 sheets and Geoff Gray, James Layfield and Manning Gottlieb Media were credited as the campaign's media planners, with Blue Source, who were also credited in the liner notes for "design", acted as the creative agency.

Neither the album or its singles were commercially successful. Tilt only managed to reach number 46 in the UK Albums Chart, a commercial failure after their previous release, Like You Do...Best of Lightning Seeds (1997) had reached number 5. According to Justin Lewis in The Rough Guide to Rock, Tilt was "lost in the rush of big sellers" prior to Christmas 1999 and noted that "even Broudie's collaborations with [Pickering and Hall] failed to reel in the punters." The two singles did not fare successfully either, with "Life's Too Short" only reaching 27 on the UK Singles Chart, and "Sweetest Soul Sensations" only reaching number 67, becoming their final and all time lowest entry on the chart. Broudie grew distasteful of promoting Tilt, saying "[I]t was that boyband manufactured pop period [...] It felt like the world had changed and I didn't fit. There was a lot of turmoil in my personal life and I think my heart went out of it. I went through a period of thinking I might not make music anymore."

== Critical reception and aftermath ==
Professional ratings
Review scores
Source	Rating
AllMusic	4/5 stars
Exclaim!	(favourable)
The Independent	(favourable)
Colin Larkin	3/5 stars
NME	4/10
Q	4/5 stars

Jason Damas of AllMusic was favourable, saying: "[T]he album is a minor disappointment because it seems that just as the group began to sound like a live act... they reverted to being a slick pop band. This is not to say that Tilt is a bad record, however; it's quite the opposite. Some of the lyrics here are Broudie's most affected yet, and some of the arrangements are very exciting." He singled out "Life's Too Short" and "Crowdpleaser" as highlights.

Nicholas Barber of The Independent called it Broudie's "best album yet", with "some of his strongest, most affecting melodies". It was highlighted by the newspaper as "Disc of the Week." Rob Bolton of Exclaim! urged readers to "get it" and noted that "the magic is still there. Broudie... knows how to please a pop audience, and Tilt continues the saga brilliantly." Conversely, NME said: "[I]f Ian Broudie's lyrical fixations are anything to go by, making a record that is dominated by the sounds of machinery is a fatally flawed decision [...] He's singing about existential despair, but due to the scaffolding of bloodless beats and airbrushed synthesisers that surround him, he might as well be singing about hairspray or suchlike."

Q named Tilt as one of the 50 best albums of the year. Nonetheless, Broudie later became unsatisfied by Tilt, calling it "a really imperfect album" and feeling its songs did not reach their full potential. Broudie felt less musical after promoting Tilt, saying: "[I]t was that boyband manufactured pop period [...] It felt like the world had changed and I didn't fit. There was a lot of turmoil in my personal life and I think my heart went out of it. I went through a period of thinking I might not make music anymore." The underwhelming commercial reception of the album persuaded Broudie to put the Lightning Seeds on hiatus in 2000.

The hiatus was long; during his break from the band, Broudie returned to his hometown of Liverpool and helped develop two local unsigned bands, The Coral and The Zutons. Subsequently, this resulted in Broudie producing critically acclaimed debut platinum selling albums for both bands, The Coral (2002) and Who Killed...... The Zutons? (2004) respectively. He credited discovering the Coral as "[waking him] up in a way. It redeemed the world. It gave [him] hope," and 2004, Broudie also released his first album under his own name, Tales Told; then two years later, Broudie re-formed the Lightning Seeds with a new lineup for live appearances, and in May 2009 the band recorded their sixth studio album and the follow-up to Tilt, Four Winds.

== Track listing ==
All tracks written by Ian Broudie (except where stated).

1. "Life's Too Short" – 4:01
2. "Sweetest Soul Sensations" – 3:29 (Broudie, Mark Cullen, Al Green)
3. "If Only" – 4:54 (Broudie, Mike Pickering)
4. "City Bright Stars" – 2:53 (Broudie, Stephen Jones)
5. "I Wish I Was in Love" – 3:25 (Broudie, Terry Hall, Peter Green)
6. "Happy Satellite" – 4:06 (Broudie, Mark Cullen)
7. "Get It Right" – 3:24 (Broudie, Terry Hall)
8. "Cigarettes & Lies" – 4:17
9. "Crowdpleaser" – 4:03 (Broudie, Mark Cullen)
10. "Tales of the Riverbank" – 4:09
11. "Pussyfoot: Reprise" – 1:41
12. "All the Things" – 3:35

== Personnel ==
- Ian Broudie – vocals, guitar, keyboards, producer
- Martyn Campbell – bass, backing vocals
- Angie Pollack – piano, keyboards, backing vocals
- Zak Starkey – drums
- Simon Rogers – producer (Tracks 1–6, 8–12)
- Tim Simenon – producer, mixing (Track 7)
- Cutfather & Joe – additional production, remixing (Track 2)
- Dave Bascombe – mixing
- Cenzo Townshend – engineer
- John Grey – engineer
- Kenny Patterson – engineer
- Mads Nilsson – engineer
- Joe Belmaati – programming
- Blue Source – design
- Natasha Michaels – artwork
- John Reid – management

== Charts ==
Chart (1999)	Peak position
UK Albums Chart	46

== Singles ==
Release date	Single	Peak
15 November 1999	"Life's Too Short"	27
6 March 2000	"Sweetest Soul Sensations"	67
