= Like You Do =

Like You Do may refer to:

- Like You Do... Best of The Lightning Seeds, 1997 greatest hits album by the Lightning Seeds
- "Like You Do", song by REO Speedwagon from the album R.E.O./T.W.O., 1972
- "Like You Do", song by the Lightning Seeds from the album Dizzy Heights, 1996
- "Like You Do", song by Joji from the album Nectar, 2020
- "Like You Do", song by Ravyn Lenae from the album Hypnos, 2022
