= Flaming Sword =

Single by Care

from the album Diamonds & Emeralds
- B-side: "Miséricorde" / "On the White Cloud"
- Released: 1983
- Genre: New wave
- Length: 3:34
- Label: Arista
- Songwriter(s): Paul Simpson, Ian Broudie
- Producer(s): Kingbird

Care singles chronology
"Flaming Sword" (1983)	"My Boyish Days (Drink to Me)" (1983)

"Flaming Sword" is the debut single by English new wave band Care, released in 1983 on Arista Records. It was written by both band members Paul Simpson and Ian Broudie, and produced by Broudie, under the alias Kingbird. The song charted on the UK Singles Chart where it peaked at No. 48 in May 1983 and remained on the chart for a total of 5 weeks.

Broudie later recorded his version of "Flaming Sword" with his band the Lightning Seeds which first appeared on the 1990 U.S. promo single of "Sweet Dreams" (a track from Cloudcuckooland) and again two years later on the 1992 single "Sense" (from the album Sense).

Simpson has performed in the Philippines on several occasions, singing his Wild Swans hits popular in the country and has performed "Flaming Sword" as well as "Whatever Possessed You" during his live shows there.

On 27 November 2019, Simpson joined Broudie and the Lightning Seeds on stage to perform "Flaming Sword" at the Liverpool Philharmonic Hall as part of the 25th anniversary and reissue of the album Jollification.

== Charts ==
Chart (1983)	Peak position
UK Singles (OCC)	48
