= Popinjay =

Popinjay may refer to:

== Arts and entertainment ==
- Popinjays, a British indie pop band
- The Popinjay Cavalier, an upcoming play by Quentin Tarantino
- Corporal Popinjay, a Catch-22 character

== Biology ==
- Parrot, or old-fashioned "popinjay"
- Stibochiona nicea or popinjay, a species of butterfly

== Other uses ==
- Popinjay, a dandy or foppish person
- Popinjay (sport), a shooting sport that can be performed with either rifles or archery equipment
