= Care (band) =

English new wave band

- Origin: Liverpool, England
- Genres: New wave
- Years active: 1983–1985; 1997
- Label: Arista
- Past members: Paul Simpson; Ian Broudie

Care were an English new wave band formed by Paul Simpson and Ian Broudie in 1983 in Liverpool, England. Care were created after the split of the Wild Swans when singer Paul Simpson (also ex-keyboardist for the Teardrop Explodes) came together with guitarist Ian Broudie (previously of Big in Japan and Original Mirrors). The first single was released in June 1983.

== History ==
Paul Simpson is the vocalist of the Wild Swans, whose songs include the 1981 single "The Revolutionary Spirit". Simpson has said that the Care single "Whatever Possessed You" was originally written by him as a Wild Swans song. An album by Care was recorded but has never been released. The singles "Whatever Possessed You", "Flaming Sword" (a top 50 single in the United Kingdom in 1983) and "My Boyish Days" were released by Camden in 1997 on a compilation album entitled Diamonds & Emeralds, which also included the duo's B-sides, unfinished demos and tracks intended for Love Crowns and Crucifies. A similar but more extensive 2-CD compilation of Care recordings, also called Love Crowns & Crucifies, has been announced for release in February 2026.

According to AllMusic, Care developed a cult following in Japan and the Philippines (where Care's songs were more popular than they were in their native UK), which kept the group's memory alive. The song "Chandeliers" became the subject of a plagiarism accusation in 2021 when the song "Pinoy Ako" by Filipino rock band Orange and Lemons — which was used as the theme song for the Pinoy Big Brother franchise — was alleged to have been an unauthorised derivative of "Chandeliers".

The band broke up in 1985 after the departure of Simpson.

== Post-Care ==
Upon leaving Care, Simpson re-formed the Wild Swans and released two albums Bringing Home the Ashes (1988, Sire) and Space Flower (1990, Sire). Space Flower reunited Broudie and Simpson, with Broudie producing the album and playing guitar. Simpson performed under the moniker Skyray from 1996 to 2006; he re-formed again the Wild Swans in 2008, releasing a new album, The Coldest Winter for a Hundred Years (2011, Occultation Recordings).

Ian Broudie went on to form the Lightning Seeds in the late 1980s, releasing a string of albums which spawned hit singles like "Pure", "Change", "Sugarcoated Iceberg", "The Life of Riley" and "You Showed Me". As a solo artist, Broudie released his first album, Tales Told, in 2004.

== Discography ==
=== Compilation ===
- Diamonds & Emeralds (1997)
- Love Crowns & Crucifies (2026)

=== Singles ===
- "Flaming Sword" (1983) – UK No. 48
- "My Boyish Days (Drink to Me)" (1983)
- "Whatever Possessed You" (1984)
