= Original Mirrors =

British band

- Origin: Liverpool, England
- Genres: New wave
- Years active: 1979–1981
- Label: Mercury
- Past members: Steve Allen; Ian Broudie; Jonathan Perkins; Phil Spalding; Pete Kircher; Jimmy Hughes

Original Mirrors were a British new wave band formed in Liverpool in 1979. Featuring members of several earlier punk/new wave bands, they signed to Mercury Records and released two albums before splitting in 1981, with members going on to play in the Lightning Seeds and Status Quo.

== History ==
The band were formed in 1979 by songwriters Ian Broudie (formerly of Big in Japan and Secrets) and Steve Allen (formerly of Deaf School). They recruited former XTC and Stadium Dogs keyboardist/guitarist Jonathan Perkins, Phil Spalding, formerly bassist with Bernie Tormé, and drummer Pete Kircher.

They were signed by Mercury Records and their first release was the single "Could This Be Heaven" in November 1979. A second single, "Boys Cry", preceded a self-titled debut album in February 1980. Jimmy Hughes replaced Spalding prior to the band's second album, Heart-twango & Raw-beat (1981). A final single, "20,000 Dreamers", followed before the band split up.

Spalding left to join Toyah then later GTR and Mike Oldfield's band. Broudie went on to form Care and later the Lightning Seeds, also establishing himself as a successful producer. Kircher joined Status Quo in 1982, staying with the band until 1985. Allen went on to be Senior A&R Director at WEA's Eternal label. Hughes joined Department S.

== Discography ==
=== Albums ===
- Original Mirrors (1980)
- Heart-twango & Raw-beat (1981)

Compilations

- Heartbeat - the Best of the Original Mirrors (1996)

=== Singles ===
- "Could This Be Heaven" (1979)
- "Boys Cry" (1980)
- "Flying" (1980) - Italy-only release
- "Dancing with the Rebels" (1981)
- "20,000 Dreamers" (1981)
