= Dizzy Heights =

Studio album by The Lightning Seeds
- Released: 11 November 1996
- Recorded: 1995–1996
- Studio: Eel Pie
- Genre: Alternative rock, Britpop
- Length: 43:00
- Label: Epic
- Producer: Ian Broudie; Simon Rogers; Dave Bascombe

The Lightning Seeds chronology
| Pure (1996) | Dizzy Heights (1996) | Like You Do... Best of The Lightning Seeds (1997) |

Singles from Dizzy Heights
- 1. "Ready or Not" Released: 26 February 1996; 2. "What If..." Released: 21 October 1996; 3. "Sugar Coated Iceberg" Released: 6 January 1997; 4. "You Showed Me" Released: 14 April 1997

Dizzy Heights is the fourth studio album by British alternative rock band The Lightning Seeds, released in 1996, and reached No. 11 in the UK Albums Chart. It was re-issued in Sony Mid Price range in August 1999.

== Writing and recording ==
Dizzy Heights was recorded at the Eel Pie Island studio, a barge on the River Thames Ian Broudie had rented from Pete Townshend of The Who. Work on the album was halted midway through 1996 so Broudie could concentrate on "Three Lions," which the Football Association had approached him to write, in time for Euro 96.

According to Broudie, the album was recorded in two 'sections' – one with the band utilising live drums and bass guitar, the other using loops and samplers produced by Broudie.

== Songs ==
=== Singles ===
The first single to be released from the album was "Ready or Not", which featured B-side covers of "Another Girl, Another Planet" and Wire's "Outdoor Miner". It reached No. 20 in the UK charts. The single version differs from that found as the penultimate track on the album.

"What If..." was released October 1996 in the UK. It peaked at No. 14 in the charts and, continuing in the vein of the previous single, included a cover of The Beach Boys' "Here Today" as a cassette-only B-side. The single's title track, co-written by Terry Hall and Broudie, featured a poppy sound reminiscent of The Turtles' "Happy Together". The song is regarded as a stand-out track of the album by Broudie himself, who cites The Beach Boys and The Turtles as influences behind the song.

"Sugar Coated Iceberg" was co-written with Stephen Jones of Babybird, who Broudie admired as a contemporary songwriter partially due to the sense of humour exhibited in his lyrics. On hearing "You're Gorgeous" and "Too Handsome To Be Homeless" played live, Broudie suggested to Jones that it would be "great to get together and write a song". According to Broudie, the words were written around the title, coming from the concept of a sugar-coated iceberg.

"You Showed Me", a cover of the Turtles song and the fourth single from Dizzy Heights, was originally intended to be a B-side to "What If..." but it was decided by the band that the produced version was good enough to be on the LP. Coming together relatively quickly, the track utilised loops and samplers from the Turtles original, "going back to machines" as Broudie put it. The song was to be The Lightning Seeds' most successful chart release (not including the two versions of "Three Lions", co-written with Frank Skinner and David Baddiel) reaching No. 8 in the UK. By the time the song was released as a single, drummer Chris Sharrock had left the band to join Robbie Williams' backing group, and new percussionist Zak Starkey took his place in the video.

All single releases featured on the band's 1997 greatest hits compilation, Like You Do, along with a re-recorded version of "Waiting for Today to Happen". The four single tracks can also be found on 2006 compilation The Very Best Of.

=== Non-single tracks ===
The album opens with "Imaginary Friends", a tongue-in-cheek comment on modern society and moves into a more acoustic mode in "Waiting for Today to Happen", a track written by Broudie in collaboration with Manic Street Preachers bassist Nicky Wire. "Touch and Go" and "Like You Do" are quoted by Broudie as being placed 'in a line' with "The Life of Riley" and "Pure" as being semi-autobiographical, which he cites along with a number of other songs from previous albums as feeling like 'one big song' to him. "Like You Do" would provide the title of the band's 1997 greatest hits compilation though the song did not appear on the collection itself. The album closes with "Fishes on the Line" which contains lyrics bordering on the surreal and an anthemic guitar outro.

== Release and reception ==
Professional ratings
Review scores
| Source | Rating |
|---|---|
| AllMusic | 4/5 stars |
| Wall of Sound | 74/100 |

Andy Gill of The Independent criticised the "clichéd and unimaginative" nature of tracks such as "Imaginary Friends", blasting "Fingers and Thumbs" and the 'flimsy' "Wishaway" as borrowing too heavily from the Beatles. Billboard's Jonathan Cohen was equally as critical of "Wishaway" and "Touch and Go" on his website Nude as the News, claiming the album is "sucked into a netherworld of redundant riffs". Special criticism is reserved for "Sugar Coated Iceberg" which, according to Cohen, is ruined by "cornball" synth programming, and although "Ready or Not" and "Imaginary Friends" are praised, the album as a whole is described as "un-original".

The Spectator's Marcus Berkmann was slightly more praising of Dizzy Heights and indeed the first five Lightning Seeds albums, albeit in retrospect, in his 2006 article 'Seeds of Joy'. Steven Thomas Erlewine of All Music Guide is also largely praising of the album, stating that a number of "terrific moments" "keep Broudie's reputation as a pop craftsman intact".

== Track listing ==
All songs written by Ian Broudie (except where stated).

1. "Imaginary Friends" – 2:44 (Broudie, Terry Hall)
2. "You Bet Your Life" – 3:34
3. "Waiting for Today to Happen" – 3:34 (Broudie, Nicky Wire)
4. "What If..." – 3:23 (Broudie, Hall)
5. "Sugar Coated Iceberg" – 3:53 (Broudie, Stephen Jones)
6. "Touch and Go" – 3:53
7. "Like You Do" – 3:23 (Broudie, Terry Hall)
8. "Wishaway" – 3:17
9. "Fingers and Thumbs" – 3:21
10. "You Showed Me" – 4:08 (Gene Clark, Roger McGuinn)
11. "Ready or Not" – 3:50
12. "Fishes on the Line" – 3:54

== B-sides ==
Not including remixes, this is a list of all b-sides released by The Lightning Seeds during the 96-97 Dizzy Heights phase.

from "Ready or Not"

- "Another Girl Another Planet"
- "Whole Wide World"
- "Punch And Judy (Electric '96 Version)"
- "Outdoor Miner"

from "What If..."

- "Never"
- "The Crunch"

from "Sugar Coated Iceberg"

- "This Power"
- "S.F. Sorrow Is Born"
- "Porpoise Song"
- "Why Why Why (Group Version '97)"
- "Telling Tales (Group Version '97)"

== Personnel ==
- Ian Broudie – vocals, guitar, producer
- Simon Rogers – keyboards, programming, producer
- Martyn Campbell – bass, backing vocals
- Angie Pollock – keyboards, backing vocals
- Chris Sharrock – drums
- Clive Layton – Hammond organ, piano
- Terry Hall, Carl Brown, Paul Roberts – backing vocals

Technical

- Dave Bascombe – producer, mixing
- Cenzo Townshend – engineer
- John Grey – engineer
- Kenny Patterson – engineer
- Mark Farrow – design
- John Ross – photography

== Charts ==
=== Weekly charts ===
Weekly chart performance for Dizzy Heights
| Chart (1996–1997) | Peak position |
|---|---|
| Australian Albums (ARIA) | 151 |
| UK Albums (OCC) | 11 |

=== Year-end charts ===
Year-end chart performance for Dizzy Heights
| Chart (1996) | Position |
|---|---|
| UK Albums (OCC) | 75 |
| Chart (1997) | Position |
| UK Albums (OCC) | 91 |

== Certifications ==
- United Kingdom (BPI): Silver, Gold (1 January 1997)

== Singles ==
Chart performance for singles from Dizzy Heights
| Release date | Single | Peak |
|---|---|---|
| 26 February 1996 | "Ready or Not" | 20 |
| 21 October 1996 | "What If..." | 14 |
| 6 January 1997 | "Sugar Coated Iceberg" | 12 |
| 14 April 1997 | "You Showed Me" | 8 |
