= Four Winds (album) =

Studio album by The Lightning Seeds
- Released: 18 May 2009
- Genre: Alternative rock
- Length: 34:20
- Label: Universal (2700799)
- Producer: Ian Broudie

The Lightning Seeds chronology
| The Very Best of The Lightning Seeds (2006) | Four Winds (2009) | See You In the Stars (2022) |

Singles from Four Winds
- 1. "Ghosts" Released: 11 May 2009; 2. "Don't Walk On By" Released: 3 August 2009

Professional ratings
Review scores
| Source | Rating |
|---|---|
| Allmusic | 3/5 stars |

Four Winds is the sixth studio album by the rock band The Lightning Seeds. It was released in 2009 through Universal. The record is the band's first album of new tracks since 1999. The first single, "Ghosts", was released on 11 May 2009.

== Track listing ==
All tracks written by Ian Broudie (except where stated).

1. "4 Winds" – 5:02
2. "Things Just Happened" – 3:18
3. "Ghosts" (Broudie, James Skelly) – 3:09
4. "Said and Done" – 3:28
5. "Don't Walk On By" – 3:46
6. "The Story Goes" (Broudie, J. Mullen) – 3:03
7. "On a Day Like This" (Broudie, Skelly) – 3:15
8. "All I Do" – 3:46
9. "I'll Be Around" – 2:35
10. "I Still Feel the Same" (Broudie, Matt Cullen) – 3:00

== Personnel ==
The Lightning Seeds

- Ian Broudie – vocals, guitar, producer

Production

- Simon Rogers – string and woodwind arrangements
- Dave Bascombe – mixing
- Stephen Harris – mixing

Additional musicians

- James Skelly – guitar
- Paul Duffy – guitar
- Nick Power – keyboards
- Lee Southall – bass
- Ian Skelly – drums
- Raife Burchell – drums
- Scott Marmion – backing vocals
- Sophie Paterson – backing vocals

Other personnel

- Pelle Crépin – photography

== Charts ==
| Chart (2009) | Peak position |
|---|---|
| UK Albums Chart | 67 |
