= Popinjays =

British indie pop band

The Popinjays
- Wendy Robinson and Polly Hancock

Background information
- Origin: London, England
- Genres: Indie pop
- Years active: 1988–1994, 2015–present
- Labels: One Little Indian Records; Epic Records (US)
- Members: Wendy Robinson vocals Polly Hancock vocals, guitar
- Website: Popinjaysband.com

The Popinjays are a British indie pop band, mainly active between 1988 and 1994, and again from 2015 to the present. Most of their records were released on the One Little Indian Records label in the UK, and on Epic/One Little Indian in the US.

== Career ==
The band was formed by Wendy Robinson (vocals) and Polly Hancock (vocals, guitar), initially with a drum machine. This line-up recorded the debut "Don't Go Back" EP on Big Cat UK (catalogue number BBA02) in August 1988) achieving "Single of the Week" in Melody Maker. A John Peel session, produced by Dale Griffin and recorded at the BBC studios in Golders Green, London, was first broadcast on 21 September 1988 and repeated on 11 October 1988. It featured four original songs; "Perfect Dream Home", "Fine Lines", "Dr Fell" and "Backward Daydream". They then recruited Dana Baldinger (born Seattle, Washington), and signed to One Little Indian Records, releasing "Please Let Me Go" as a single in April 1990; this too attained Single of The Week in Melody Maker. Baldinger was eventually replaced by Anne Rogers of The Crowd Scene. In December 1989, the British music magazine NME reported that the Popinjays, along with others such as Power of Dreams, Carter the Unstoppable Sex Machine and The Charlatans, were their pick as 'stars of tomorrow'.

Their debut album, Bang Up To Date With The Popinjays, was released in April 1990, and was followed by a live tour in May and June 1990 with One Little Indian label mates Kitchens of Distinction. In late 1990, Seamus Feeney joined the line up on drums making the band a four-piece for the first time. The band continued with live shows through the autumn, touring with both Cud and The Heart Throbs. The next single, "Vote Elvis", was produced by Jessica Corcoran at The Greenhouse Studios in London. In 1991, The Popinjays signed to US Independent label Alpha International, and the single "Vote Elvis" was released in the United States in April 1991, entering the Billboard Modern Rock Chart the following month peaking at number 17 in June 1991.

In August 1991, the band played at the Reading Festival. and, in December of that year, their second album Flying Down to Mono Valley was recorded at The Farmyard with Ian Broudie producing.

On 11 May 1992, the single "Monster Mouth" was released by One Little Indian Records. A UK tour to support the release of Flying Down to Mono Valley followed, from August to October 1992.

In 1992, the rhythm section was replaced by two brothers and former members of the band Airhead, namely bassist Ben Kesteven and drummer Sam Kesteven.

In 1994, the third and final album Tales from the Urban Prairie was recorded and released, again on One Little Indian Records. A BBC Radio live session with Mark Radcliffe was broadcast on 1 June 1994.

After a 21-year hiatus, the Popinjays original line up of Wendy Robinson and Polly Hancock played their first live show in 21 years at The Lexington, London on 4 April 2015, and again at Indie Daze at The Forum London on 3 October 2015.

== Discography ==
=== Singles ===
Year	Title	Chart positions	Album
Year	Title	US Modern Rock	Album
1988	"Don't Go Back"		
1990	"Perfect Dream Home"		Bang up to Date with the Popinjays
1990	"Vote Elvis"	17	
1991	"Please Let Me Go"		Bang up to Date with the Popinjays
1992	"Monster Mouth"		Flying Down to Mono Valley
1992	"Too Jung"		Flying Down to Mono Valley
1992	"I'm a Believer"		

=== Albums ===
- Bang up to Date with the Popinjays (1990, One Little Indian)
- Flying Down to Mono Valley (1992, One Little Indian)
- Tales from the Urban Prairie (1994, One Little Indian)
