= Ian Broudie =

English musician

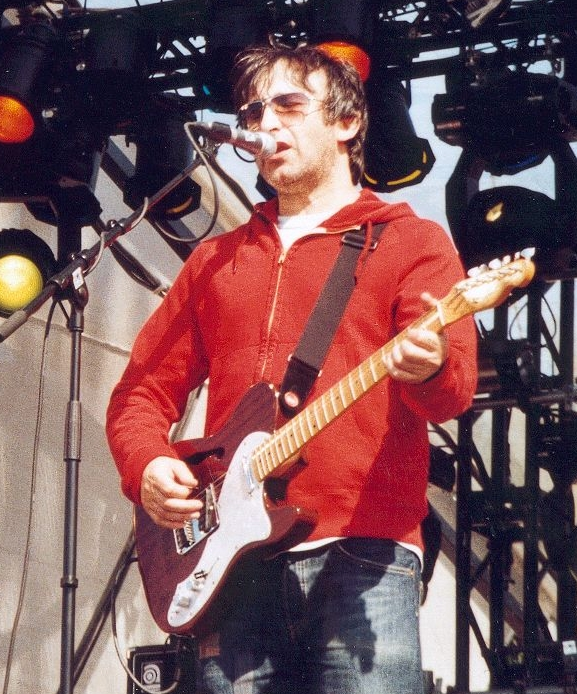
- Broudie in 2006

Background information
- Also known as: Kingbird
- Born: Ian Zachary Broudie; 4 August 1958 (age 68); Liverpool, England
- Genres: Alternative rock; new wave; post-punk; Britpop; indie pop; pop rock; folk rock
- Occupations: Singer-songwriter; musician; record producer
- Instruments: Vocals; guitar; bass; keyboard; drums
- Years active: 1977–present
- Label: Deltasonic

Ian Zachary Broudie (born 4 August 1958) is an English musician and singer-songwriter from Liverpool. After emerging from the post-punk scene in Liverpool in the late 1970s as a member of Big in Japan, Broudie went on to produce albums (sometimes under the name Kingbird) for artists including Echo & the Bunnymen, the Fall, the Coral, the Zutons and the Subways.

Around 1989, he began writing and recording under the name Lightning Seeds, releasing the album Cloudcuckooland through Rough Trade on the independent label Ghetto Records, eventually putting together a live touring band in 1994. The Lightning Seeds achieved great commercial success during much of the 1990s. In 2004, Broudie released an album titled Tales Told under his own name. The Lightning Seeds reformed in 2006 and released their sixth studio album Four Winds in 2009. A seventh album, See You in the Stars, was released in 2022.

== Early life and career ==
Ian Broudie was born into an Orthodox Jewish family. He played in Liverpool's fledgling punk scene in the 1970s. He was a member of the band Big in Japan, with Holly Johnson and Bill Drummond. He was also a founder member of John Peel favourites Original Mirrors in the early 1980s, and was credited as a member of Bette Bright and the Illuminations on their lone album from 1981. In 1983, he recorded and wrote tracks under the name Care with vocalist Paul Simpson; the duo released three singles, including the minor UK chart hit "Flaming Sword".

== The Lightning Seeds ==
Broudie began writing as the Lightning Seeds at the end of the 1980s, scoring a debut hit with the song "Pure". The Lightning Seeds had just one member: Broudie.

The Lightning Seeds produced a selection of well-received singles and albums in the 1990s. The albums Cloudcuckooland (1990) and Sense (1992) followed. The latter's song "The Life of Riley" became the backing music for Match of the Day's Goal of the Month competition. In 1994 Broudie created a touring band so the songs could be played live. Their 1994 album Jollification is considered by many as the moment the Lightning Seeds arrived as a mainstream band. During the same period, Broudie produced albums for other acts, including Northside, The Primitives, Terry Hall and Dodgy.

The Lightning Seeds twice took football anthem "Three Lions" (with comedians Frank Skinner and David Baddiel) to number one, with different lyrics for the Euro 96 and France '98 tournaments (Broudie himself is a supporter of Liverpool; Lightning Seeds album covers and inlays often contain references such as Justice for the 96 and Support the Liverpool Dockers). In the years since France '98, the song has been released multiple times for football tournaments, and now has the unique distinction of being the only song in existence to have become UK No. 1 four separate times with the same artists: two one-week stints in 1996, three straight weeks in 1998 for the remake, and again in 2018 for the original during the World Cup held in Russia.

On 13 December 1996 and 14 March 1997, Broudie was the guest host of Top of the Pops. Later that year, the Lightning Seeds headlined the Hillsborough Justice Concert, which was held at Liverpool's Anfield stadium to raise fund for the families in their struggle for justice.

Broudie returned with a new line-up in 2009, releasing the album Four Winds, and has extensively toured since with a line-up including Angie Pollack (piano), Martyn Campbell (guitar), and Ian's son Riley Broudie (guitar).

In 2022, the Lightning Seeds released the album See You In The Stars.

== Production work ==
Broudie worked as a producer with many independent labels including Factory Records, Creation Records, Zoo Records and Rough Trade, sometimes under the name 'Kingbird'.

Broudie subsequently concentrated on production for other bands, working with the Coral, the Subways, the Zutons, French rock band Noir Desir for their first long album Veuillez rendre l'âme, the Rifles, on an early single by Sleeper and on a handful of I Am Kloot songs.

=== Production discography ===
==== 1980s ====
- 1980: Echo & the Bunnymen - Crocodiles
- 1980: Original Mirrors - Original Mirrors
- 1981: TV21 - A Thin Red Line
- 1983: Echo & the Bunnymen - Porcupine
- 1984: Bourgie Bourgie - Breaking Point reached No. 48 in UK singles chart
- 1984: The Danse Society - Heaven Is Waiting
- 1985: The Pale Fountains - ...From Across the Kitchen Table
- 1985: Wall of Voodoo - Seven Days in Sammystown
- 1986: The Colourfield - The Colour Field
- 1986: The Three O'Clock - Ever After
- 1987: The Icicle Works - If You Want to Defeat Your Enemy Sing His Song
- 1987: The Bodines - Played
- 1988: Richard Jobson - Badman
- 1988: Human Drama - Hopes Prayers Dreams Heart Soul Mind Love Life Death
- 1988: The Fall - I Am Kurious Oranj
- 1988: Shack - Zilch
- 1989: Benny Profane - Trapdoor Swing
- 1989: Noir Désir - Veuillez rendre l'âme (à qui elle appartient)

==== 1990s ====
- 1990: The Lightning Seeds - Cloudcuckooland
- 1990: Frazier Chorus - Ray
- 1990: The Wild Swans - Space Flower
- 1991: Northside - Chicken Rhythms
- 1991: The Primitives - Galore
- 1991: The Wendys - Gobbledygook
- 1991: The Katydids - Shangri-La
- 1991: Bill Pritchard - Jolie
- 1992: Popinjays - Flying Down to Mono Valley
- 1992: The Lightning Seeds - Sense
- 1993: Dodgy - The Dodgy Album
- 1994: The Frank and Walters - Trains, Boats and Planes
- 1994: Alison Moyet - Essex
- 1994: Terry Hall - Home
- 1994: Dodgy - Homegrown
- 1994: The Lightning Seeds - Jollification
- 1995: Sleeper - Smart
- 1996: The Lightning Seeds - Dizzy Heights
- 1998: Republica - Speed Ballads
- 1999: The Lightning Seeds - Tilt

==== 2000s ====
- 2002: The Coral - The Coral
- 2002: Texas - Careful What You Wish For
- 2003: I Am Kloot - I Am Kloot
- 2003: The Coral - Magic and Medicine
- 2004: The Coral - Nightfreak and the Sons of Becker
- 2004: The Zutons - Who Killed...... The Zutons?
- 2004: Ian Broudie - Tales Told
- 2005: The Subways - Young for Eternity
- 2006: The Rifles - No Love Lost
- 2006: The Automatic - Not Accepted Anywhere
- 2007: The Coral - Roots & Echoes
- 2009: The Lightning Seeds - Four Winds

==== 2010s ====
- 2013: Miles Kane - Don't Forget Who You Are

== Solo career ==
On 11 October 2004, Broudie released his debut solo effort, Tales Told, embraced by critics and fans alike despite the fact that Tales Told saw Broudie move into folk rock territory and away from the slick pop sound of the Lightning Seeds. The first song on the album, "Song for No One", was featured in the opening episode of the third season of the TV series The O.C.

== Solo discography ==
=== Albums and EPs ===
- Tales Told (2004)
- Smoke Rings EP (2005)

=== Featured singles ===
Year	Title	Peak chart position
Year	Title	UK
1997	"Perfect Day" (with various artists)	1
2010	"Three Lions 2010" (with The Squad)	21

== Personal life ==
Broudie lives in London but spends a substantial amount of time writing and recording in Liverpool as his studio is located there. In 2018, he said he was recording in his home. He has a son, fellow Lightning Seeds member Riley Broudie (b. 1991), who was the inspiration for the band's 1992 single "The Life of Riley".

Broudie published his memoir, Tomorrow's Here Today, in 2023.

== Other sources ==
- Jewish Chronicle, 16 February 2007, p. 43: "The life of Broudie"
