= Tales Told =

Studio album by Ian Broudie
- Released: 11 October 2004
- Genre: Britpop, folk rock
- Length: 34:40
- Label: Deltasonic
- Producer: Ian Broudie

Ian Broudie chronology
Tales Told (2004)	Smoke Rings EP (2005)

Professional ratings
Review scores
Source	Rating
AllMusic	4/5 stars
The Guardian	2/5 stars
Pitchfork Media	5.9/10

Tales Told is British singer/songwriter Ian Broudie's debut release, staging a return to his roots with traditional instruments - real drums, acoustic guitars and fiddles with no studio trickery.

== Track listing ==
All songs on the album are written by Ian Broudie, except where indicated. Tracks 13-16 are from the Expanded Edition.

1. "Song for No One"
2. "Whenever I Do" (Ian Broudie, James Skelly)
3. "He Sails Tonight" (Broudie, Skelly)
4. "Smoke Rings" (Broudie, Terry Hall)
5. "Got No Plans"
6. "Always Knocking" (Broudie, Skelly)
7. "Tales Told"
8. "Lipstick"
9. "Super Cinema"
10. "Home from Home"
11. "Something Street" (Broudie, Nick Power)
12. "Broudie's Blues" (Secret track)
13. "Home From Home (Band Version)"
14. "Song For No One (Demo)"
15. "Shifting Sands"
16. "Something Street (Early Version)" (Broudie, Nick Power)
