= Simon Rogers =

British composer

- Origin: United Kingdom
- Occupation(s): Musician, producer, composer
- Instrument(s): Guitar, bass, keyboards
- Years active: 1980–present

Simon Rogers is an English musician, record producer, and BAFTA and EMMY nominated composer, who has been a member of The Fall and The Lightning Seeds.

== Biography ==
In 1976, Rogers entered the Royal College of Music, London, later becoming an associate (ARCM) and winning their guitar prize in 1980. Upon leaving he joined Ballet Rambert's Mercury Ensemble as their guitarist. During this period he composed several ballet scores, including Entre Dos Aguas and Fabrications for London Contemporary Dance Theatre. He also made his first commercial hit, joining the South American folk music group Incantation who enjoyed some UK and international chart success in the early 1980s, their best known single being "Cacharpaya".

In 1985, Rogers left both Rambert and Incantation and joined the post-punk group the Fall, initially as temporary bassist replacing Stephen Hanley. After Hanley's return from paternity leave, Rogers joined the Fall on guitar and keyboards for the album This Nation's Saving Grace and co-writing several songs on the follow-up Bend Sinister. He produced their top 20 album The Frenz Experiment (1988) before parting company with the group. During this period, he also produced two albums for Bauhaus singer Peter Murphy.

He began to compose for television whilst at Rambert and his credits include TV dramas such as The Old Men at the Zoo (1982), Much Ado About Nothing (1983) and The Rainbow (1988) as well as two American TV movies, Daddy (1987) and The Preppie Murder (1989) for ABC.

In the 1990s, Rogers continued to work in music production, beginning a long association with the Lightning Seeds, for whom he co-produced the albums Sense, Jollification, Dizzy Heights and Tilt as well as the football anthem "Three Lions". He also returned to The Fall to produce the majority of The Infotainment Scan. Throughout the '90s he was also involved with underground dance music, remixing under the names RAMP and Slacker. Slacker signed to XL in '97 and had two hits, "Scared" and "Your Face" during their time on the label. There were also several successful releases on Boy George's More Protein label, including Generations of Love and Everything Starts with an E. He has also developed solo projects such as Leuroj and T-Era for the Skint/Loaded labels, and Steiger for John Digweed’s Bedrock Records label.

In 2003, he returned to television music, scoring 40 (starring Eddie Izzard and Kerry Fox) for Channel 4. Work on other productions followed swiftly after the first broadcast of the series including ITV's Rebus, starring Ken Stott, various episodes of BBC's Dalziel and Pascoe and Jon Howe's film Streets which was selected for the Venice Film Festival of 2004.

Other credits include scores for South Africa, Murder Most Foul, Ochberg's Orphans and Dancing with the Devil in the City of God, directed by Oscar-winning documentary maker Jon Blair and the title music for Hustle (Kudos/Spooks Ltd for BBC One), which was nominated for the Outstanding Original Main Title Theme Music Emmy Award in 2007. Rogers was also part of Musicotopia who have provided music for three series of Animal Planet's River Monsters, BBC Natural World documentaries and The First World War from Above for BBC One in 2010. In 2012, he scored the 4th season of CBBC drama Young Dracula. He also composed the music for The Dumping Ground since its second season. He was BAFTA nominated in the Music Factual category in 2024 for "A Time To Die" an ITV documentary dealing with assisted dying.

== See also ==
- List of The Fall members

== Sources ==
- Doyle, Tom (March 2015). "The Fall 'Hit The North". Sound on Sound.
- Pringle, Steve. You Must Get Them All: The Fall On Record. London: Route Publishing, 2022. ISBN 978-1-9019-2788-7
