= Sense (The Lightning Seeds album) =

Studio album by the Lightning Seeds
- Released: 6 April 1992
- Recorded: 1991
- Studio: Rob's Front Room, Liverpool
- Genre: Alternative rock, indie pop
- Length: 42:17
- Label: Virgin; MCA (US/Canada)
- Producer: Ian Broudie, Simon Rogers

The Lightning Seeds chronology
Cloudcuckooland (1990)	Sense (1992)	Jollification (1994)

Singles from Sense
- 1. "The Life of Riley" Released: 2 March 1992; 2. "Sense" Released: 18 May 1992

Professional ratings
Review scores
Source	Rating
AllMusic	3/5 stars
The Encyclopedia of Popular Music	3/5 stars
Entertainment Weekly	B+
MusicHound Rock: The Essential Album Guide	3/5 stars
NME	4/10

Sense is the second album by English musical group the Lightning Seeds, released in 1992. It was produced by Ian Broudie and Simon Rogers.

== Background ==
"The Life of Riley", released as a single in 1992, was written for Broudie's son Riley.

The album's second single, "Sense", was co-written by Broudie and Specials singer and long-time writing partner Terry Hall. The single includes a track written by Broudie and Paul Simpson from their time as Care, "Flaming Sword", as a B-side. Hall released a re-recorded version of "Sense" with himself on vocals in 1994.

In 2009, an instrumental version of "Sense" was used in BMW's Story of Joy advertisement. The instrumental version of "The Life of Riley" also appeared on BBC's Match of the Day, soundtracking football high points.

== Critical reception ==
Trouser Press called the album a "disgruntled production extravaganza" and "a strange achievement but not an unpleasant one". The Washington Post wrote that "the pop-rock sound of the previous album, though not utterly transformed, has become softer, vaguer, more liquid".

== Commercial performance ==
The album reached No. 50 on the UK Albums Chart and the singles, "The Life of Riley" and "Sense", charted at No. 28 and No. 31, respectively.

== Track listing ==
All songs written by Ian Broudie (except where stated).

1. "Sense" – 4:12 (Broudie, Terry Hall)
2. "The Life of Riley" – 4:05
3. "Blowing Bubbles" – 4:16
4. "A Cool Place" – 2:57
5. "Where Flowers Fade" – 5:03 (Broudie, Hall)
6. "A Small Slice of Heaven" – 3:50 (Broudie, Hall)
7. "Tingle Tangle" – 3:22
8. "Happy" – 4:33 (Broudie, Ian McNabb)
9. "Marooned" – 4:40
10. "Thinking Up, Looking Down" – 5:19

== Personnel ==
The Lightning Seeds

- Ian Broudie – vocals, all instruments (except as noted), producer
- Simon Rogers – all instruments (except as noted), producer

Production

- Cenzo Townshend – engineer
- Phil Ault – additional engineer
- Simon Dawson – additional engineer
- Bob Ludwig – mastering

Additional musicians

- Mark Feltham – harmonica
- Alan Dunn – accordion
- Clive Layton – Hammond organ
- Roddy Lorimer – trumpet
- Terry Hall – backing vocals
- Juliet Roberts – backing vocals
- Ian McNabb – backing vocals

Other personnel

- Peter Ashworth – photography

== Charts ==
Chart performance for Sense
Chart (1992)	Peak position
Australian Albums (ARIA)	83
New Zealand Albums (RMNZ)	50
UK Albums (OCC)	53
US Billboard 200	154

== Certifications ==
- United Kingdom (BPI): Silver (1 July 1997)
