= Jollification =

Studio album by the Lightning Seeds
- Released: 5 September 1994
- Recorded: 1993
- Genre: Alternative rock, Britpop, pop rock
- Length: 40:29
- Label: Epic
- Producer: Ian Broudie, Simon Rogers

The Lightning Seeds chronology
| Sense (1992) | Jollification (1994) | Pure (1996) |

Singles from Jollification
- 1. "Lucky You" Released: 8 August 1994; 2. "Change" Released: January 1995; 3. "Marvellous" Released: 3 April 1995; 4. "Perfect" Released: 10 July 1995; 5. "Lucky You" Released: 9 October 1995

Jollification is the third album by English rock band the Lightning Seeds. All songs were written by Ian Broudie, with contributions on some tracks from Alison Moyet, Ian McNabb and Terry Hall.

Four tracks from the album were released as singles in the UK: "Lucky You", "Marvellous", "Change" and "Perfect". It peaked at number 12 in the UK Albums Chart, and gained platinum certification in December 1995.

== Background ==
In 1989 Ian Broudie began recording alone under the name Lightning Seeds and achieved success with the psychedelic and synthpop hit "Pure", from the album Cloudcuckooland, which reached the UK Top 20. The same year "Joy" and "All I Want" were also released but failed to make an impression. "Pure" had some success in the United States Billboard Top 40, reaching No. 32. Both "Pure" and "All I Want" also reached the Modern Rock Tracks top 10. In 1991 Broudie returned to song-writing and moved labels from Rough Trade to Virgin.

== Writing and recording ==
By the end of 1993, Broudie had completed the third Lightning Seeds album Jollification, which included contributions from Terry Hall, Simon Rogers, Alison Moyet and Ian McNabb. A promotional tour began in August 1994 with their line-up consisting of, guitarist Paul Hemmings, drummer Chris Sharrock, bassist Martyn Campbell and keyboardist Ali Kane. The tour benefited from the success of the second single from the album "Change", which reached No. 13 in the UK Singles Chart, becoming Lightning Seeds' second UK top twenty hit. The album Jollification became a critical success and the other singles taken from this album ("Lucky You", "Marvellous" and "Perfect") all made noticeable impact. Mark Farrow's album cover featured the use of computer graphics to create an enormous strawberry and depicting seeds with superimposed human faces.

== Release and reception ==
Professional ratings
Review scores
| Source | Rating |
|---|---|
| AllMusic | 4/5 stars |
| Music Week | 3/5 stars |
| Select | 3/5 stars |

Jollification was released in the UK on 5 September 1994 and in the US on 20 December 1994. Jason Damas for AllMusic felt that the album is "occasionally too produced", but called it Broudie's "strongest batch of songs yet".

== Track listing ==
All songs written by Ian Broudie (except where stated).

1. "Perfect" – 3:28
2. "Lucky You" – 4:20 (Broudie, Terry Hall)
3. "Open Goals" (sample by Aaron Neville, George Porter Jr., Joseph Modeliste, Leo Nocentelli) – 3:49
4. "Change" – 4:03
5. "Why Why Why" – 4:14
6. "Marvellous" – 5:31
7. "Feeling Lazy" – 3:55 (Broudie, Ian McNabb)
8. "My Best Day" – 5:00 (Broudie, Alison Moyet)
9. "Punch & Judy" – 3:17
10. "Telling Tales" – 2:52

"Open Goals" contains a sample from "Look-Ka Py Py" as recorded by The Meters.

== Personnel ==
The Lightning Seeds

- Ian Broudie – vocals, all instruments (except as noted), producer
- Simon Rogers – all instruments (except as noted), producer

Production

- Cenzo Townshend – engineer
- David Bascombe – mixing
- Bob Ludwig – mastering

Additional musicians

- Clive Layton – Hammond organ, piano
- Marina Van-Rooy – vocals on "Why Why Why"
- Alison Moyet – vocals on "My Best Day", backing vocals
- Terry Hall – backing vocals
- Ian McNabb – backing vocals
- Carl Brown – backing vocals
- Simon Fowler – backing vocals

Other personnel

- Mark Farrow – design
- Debra Burley – co-ordination
- Andy Earl – photography

== Charts ==
=== Weekly charts ===
Chart performance for Jollification
| Chart (1994–1996) | Peak position |
|---|---|
| Australian Albums (ARIA) | 141 |
| Scottish Albums (OCC) | 8 |
| UK Albums (OCC) | 12 |

=== Year-end charts ===
1995 year-end chart performance for Jollification
| Chart (1995) | Position |
|---|---|
| UK Albums (OCC) | 26 |

1996 year-end chart performance for Jollification
| Chart (1996) | Position |
|---|---|
| UK Albums (OCC) | 74 |

== Singles ==
| Release date | Single | Peak |
|---|---|---|
| 8 August 1994 | "Lucky You" | #43 |
| 2 January 1995 | "Change" | #13 |
| 3 April 1995 | "Marvellous" | #24 |
| 10 July 1995 | "Perfect" | #18 |
| 9 October 1995 | "Lucky You" (re-release) | #15 |

== Certifications ==
- United Kingdom (BPI): Silver (1 July 1995), Gold (1 August 1995), Platinum (1 December 1995)
