= Paul Simpson (musician) =

English musician

- Born: Huyton, Merseyside, England
- Genres: Post-punk; new wave
- Years active: Mid-1970s–present
- Label: Astral Girl
- Website: paul-simpson.co.uk

Paul Simpson is an English musician, vocalist, lyricist and writer from Liverpool, England, best known for his work with the Wild Swans and Care. Musically, his contributions have crossed the genres of synth-pop, post-punk, neo-psychedelia, new wave and ambient.

== Career ==
Born in Huyton, Simpson studied at Hugh Baird College in Bootle, and later shared a flat (vacated by Julian Cope and his first wife after they broke up) on Devonshire Road with Pete de Freitas (and later Courtney Love).

His music career began in the mid-1970s punk rock band Psycho Mesh, after which he joined up with his school friend Will Sergeant as Industrial Domestic, and then the bedsit collaboration with Cope, Ian McCulloch and others under the name 'A Shallow Madness'. This later transformed into the Cope-led Teardrop Explodes, while McCulloch went on to form Echo & the Bunnymen with Sergeant.

He left the Teardrops in 1979 to form his own band the Wild Swans in 1980. Between the two incarnations of the band, he was also co-founder of the duo Care with Ian Broudie, later of the Lightning Seeds.

Simpson appeared in the video for the Teardrops' "Reward" (which proved to be the band's only UK top ten hit).

Care broke up around 1984 and after a while, he and a Mark II version of the Wild Swans reformed to record 1988's Bringing Home the Ashes and 1989's Space Flower.

After the Wild Swans split in 1990, Simpson embarked on a variety of more-or-less solo projects, including 'The White Capsule', the ambient instrumental 'Skyray', and the spoken work project The Dream Diaries, which came out of his fellowship at John Moores University.

Simpson re-formed the Wild Swans in 2009 with original member Ged Quinn, releasing a third studio album in 2011. After a virus contracted in Sri Lanka damaged his lungs, he stopped singing and has focused on instrumental pieces and writing.

For several years, he worked on his crowdfunded autobiography, Incandescent.

== Discography ==
=== Albums ===
- The Dream Diaries (2005), Astral Girl
- Man in a Burning Anorak – Vol 1 (2010), Astral Girl
- Man in a Burning Anorak – Vol 2 (2010), Astral Girl

as Skyray

- "Invisible" (1996), Ochre
- Tranquilliser (1996), Ochre
- "Neptune Variations" (1997), Ochre
- "Womb" (1999), Space Age
- Mind Lagoons (1999), Ochre
- Slow Dissolve (2000), Magnetic
- Ice Rink Music (2004), Astral Girl
- Liquid Crystal Display (2005), Astral Girl

=== with The Teardrop Explodes ===
- Sleeping Gas single (1979), Zoo

=== with The Wild Swans ===
see The Wild Swans (band)#Discography

=== with Care ===
see Care (band)#Discography

=== with The Serpents ===
- You Have Just Been Poisoned (1998), Ochre
