= Cloudcuckooland (album) =

- Cover photography by Peter Ashworth

Studio album by the Lightning Seeds
- Released: 29 January 1990
- Genre: Alternative rock, indie pop
- Length: 46:34
- Label: Ghetto (GHETT 3); MCA (US/Canada)
- Producer: Ian Broudie

The Lightning Seeds chronology
| Cloudcuckooland (1990) | Sense (1992) |

Singles from Cloudcuckooland
- 1. "Pure" Released: 5 June 1989; 2. "Joy" Released: 9 October 1989; 3. "All I Want" Released: 30 April 1990

Cloudcuckooland is the debut studio album by British band the Lightning Seeds, released in 1990. "Pure" was the band's first hit in the United Kingdom, and their only top 40 entry in the United States.

Liverpool scene peers Andy McCluskey and Ian McNabb – frontmen of OMD and the Icicle Works, respectively – appeared in guest roles.

== Reception and legacy ==
Professional ratings
Review scores
| Source | Rating |
|---|---|
| AllMusic | 4/5 stars |
| Chicago Tribune | 3/4 stars |

The Chicago Tribune noted that "this could stand a little more bite, and the mechanized percussion is hardly an attribute, but it's a credit to Broudie's craftsmanship that this record's low-key charm is only enhanced with repeated listens."

Dean Carlson of AllMusic wrote: "Even in these early days, with singles like "Pure" and "All I Want", you can hear why comparisons to a less burlesque Pet Shop Boys or a Matthew Sweet synth tribute band didn't have to be unpleasant criticisms."

"All I Want" was covered by Susanna Hoffs, formerly of the Bangles, on her 1996 album Susanna Hoffs. It was a minor US hit and a UK hit at No. 33 for two weeks.

== Track listing ==
The CD version of Cloudcuckooland included the extra track "God Help Them", originally a B-side and not on the LP version. The U.S. track listing differs from the UK version with "God Help Them" replaced by the B-sides "Fools" and "Frenzy", and it was released on the MCA label rather than the indie label Ghetto. The re-release of the U.S. album includes a new recording of "All I Want".

All songs written by Ian Broudie (except where stated).

1. "All I Want" – 2:50 (Broudie, Peter Coyle)
2. "Bound in a Nutshell" – 4:29
3. "Pure" – 3:45
4. "Sweet Dreams" – 4:25 (Broudie, Richard Jobson)
5. "The Nearly Man" – 3:06
6. "Joy" – 4:13
7. "Love Explosion" – 4:10
8. "Don't Let Go" – 3:54
9. "Control the Flame" – 3:22 (Broudie, Peter Coyle)
10. "The Price" – 4:20

The track "Sweet Dreams" was released in the U.S. as a promo single on MCA Records, which included a cover of Tim Hardin's "Hang onto a Dream" and a version of "Flaming Sword", originally by Care, a former band of Broudie.

=== Bonus tracks ===
UK CD bonus track

11. "God Help Them" – 3:44 (Broudie, Paul Simpson)

U.S. bonus tracks

11. "Fools" – 4:08
12. "Frenzy" – 3:56

== Cover ==
The album's stylised cover was designed and shot in a studio by music photographer Peter Ashworth, who said of the shoot: 'The set was a naive hand-made one, composed of cotton wool clouds supported on sticks and blown-up plastic globes hanging from the ceiling.'

== Personnel ==
The Lightning Seeds

- Ian Broudie – various instruments, vocals, producer

Production

- Cenzo Townshend – engineer
- Ian McFarlane – assistant engineer
- Paul Cobbold – additional engineer
- Pete Coleman – additional engineer
- Simon Rogers – additional programming
- Steve Brown – additional programming
- Greg Fulginiti – mastering

Additional musicians

- Henry Priestman – piano on "Bound in a Nutshell", organ on "Control the Flame"
- Mickey Kearns – saxophone
- Andy McCluskey – keyboards
- Ian McNabb – backing vocals
- Cate Shanks – backing vocals

Other personnel

- Peter Ashworth – photography

== Charts ==
| Chart (1990) | Peak position |
|---|---|
| Australian Albums (ARIA) | 143 |
| UK Albums Chart | 50 |
| US Billboard 200 | 46 |
