= The Life of Riley (song) =

1992 single by the Lightning Seeds

Single by the Lightning Seeds

from the album Sense
- Released: 2 March 1992
- Length: 4:05
- Label: Virgin
- Songwriter: Ian Broudie
- Producers: Ian Broudie, Simon Rogers

The Lightning Seeds singles chronology
| "Joy" (1990) | "The Life of Riley" (1992) | "Sense" (1992) |

"The Life of Riley" is a song by British band the Lightning Seeds. It was released in 1992 by Virgin Records from the band's second album, Sense (1992). The song was a hit when it was first released on 2 March 1992, reaching number 28 on the UK Singles Chart and number two on the US Billboard Modern Rock Tracks chart. The song later gained popularity when the BBC football programme Match of the Day began to use it frequently for segments including "Goal of the Month" throughout most of the 1990s. The song was still associated with the programme many years later and featured in a similar "Goal of the Day" segment in the mid-2000s.

== Background ==
The writer of the song, Ian Broudie, cites his son Riley as the namesake of the piece. The song title has also been used for a compilation album, Life of Riley: The Lightning Seeds Collection. A remix of "The Life of Riley" appeared on the single "Sense", and an instrumental version appeared on "Change". The single was also later reissued. The phrase "the life of Riley" (or "Reilly") is also an old Irish expression meaning a pleasant life.

The track may bear the influence of an earlier release on the same label - "The Life Of Riley" (Virgin VS283, 1978), a "jolly/sardonic ditty" (Charles Shaar Murray, NME that made the BBC playlist and was Record Of The Week on the influential Andy Peebles Show.

== Track listing ==
1. "The Life of Riley"
2. "Something in the Air"
3. "Marooned"

== Charts ==
=== Weekly charts ===
Weekly chart performance for "The Life of Riley"
| Chart (1992) | Peak position |
|---|---|
| Australia (ARIA) | 98 |
| Europe (Eurochart Hot 100) | 95 |
| Germany (GfK) | 52 |
| New Zealand (Recorded Music NZ) | 15 |
| UK Singles (Official Charts) | 28 |
| UK Airplay (Music Week) | 6 |
| US Billboard Hot 100 | 98 |
| US Modern Rock Tracks (Billboard) | 2 |

=== Year-end charts ===
Year-end chart performance for "The Life of Riley"
| Chart (1992) | Position |
|---|---|
| US Modern Rock Tracks (Billboard) | 25 |

== Release history ==
Release dates and formats for "The Life of Riley"
| Region | Date | Format(s) | Label(s) | Ref. |
|---|---|---|---|---|
| United Kingdom | 2 March 1992 | 7-inch vinyl; 12-inch vinyl | Virgin | |
| United Kingdom | 9 March 1992 | CD; cassette | Virgin | |
| Australia | 20 April 1992 | CD; cassette | Virgin | |
