= The Lightning Seeds =

English rock band

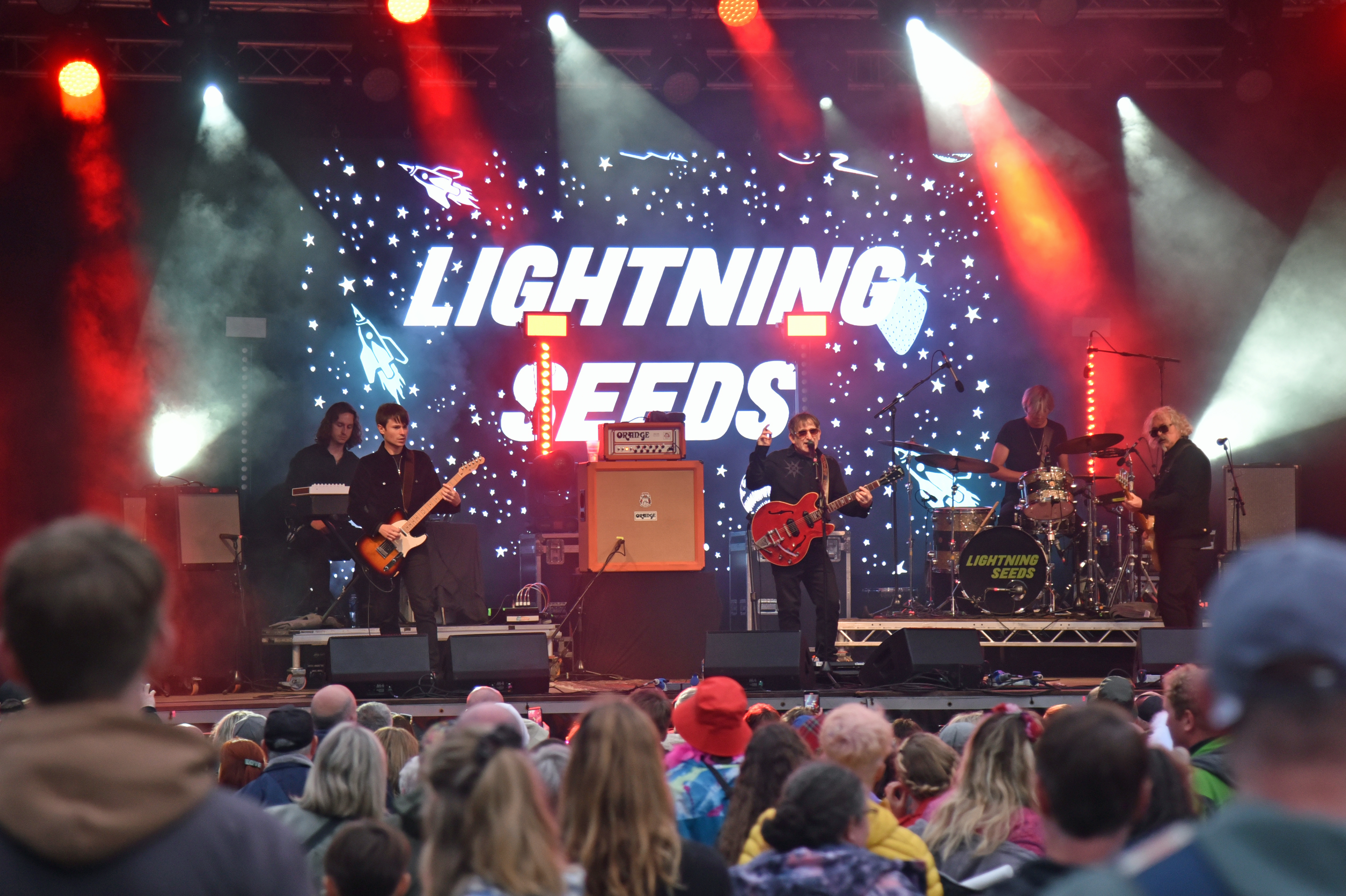
- The Lightning Seeds in 2025

Background information
- Origin: Liverpool, England
- Genres: Alternative rock; pop rock; indie pop; Britpop
- Years active: 1989–2000; 2006–present
- Labels: Ghetto; Virgin; Epic; MCA
- Spinoff of: Big in Japan; Care
- Members: Ian Broudie; Martyn Campbell; Riley Broudie; Jim Sharrock; Adele Emmas; Tim Cunningham
- Past members: Chris Sharrock; Ali Kane; Paul Hemmings; Mathew Priest; Zak Starkey; Paolo Ruiu; Rob Allum; James Bagshaw; Julian Fenton; Raife Burchell; Angie Pollock; Abi Harding
- Website: lightningseeds.co.uk

The Lightning Seeds (also known as Lightning Seeds) are an English rock band formed in Liverpool in 1989 by Ian Broudie (vocals, guitar, producer), formerly of the bands Big in Japan, Care, and Original Mirrors. Originally a studio-based solo project for Broudie, the Lightning Seeds expanded into a touring band following Jollification (1994). The group experienced commercial success throughout the 1990s and are well known for their single "Three Lions", a collaboration with comedians David Baddiel and Frank Skinner which reached No. 1 in the UK in 1996 and 2018, with a re-worked version also reaching the top spot in 1998.

== History ==
=== 1989–1993: Formation and early years ===
Prior to forming his own project, Ian Broudie had been a member of the 1970s post-punk band Big in Japan and the new wave bands Original Mirrors and Care. By the late 1980s, Broudie was better known as a producer than as a musician, and had produced albums for new wave and alternative rock artists such as Echo & the Bunnymen, Wall of Voodoo and the Fall.

In 1989, Broudie began recording alone under the name "Lightning Seeds". The name derives from a misheard lyric from Prince's 1985 hit single "Raspberry Beret", in which Prince sings the line "thunder drowns out what the lightning sees". Broudie performed all vocals and instruments on the band's first album, 1989's Cloudcuckooland, which he also produced. The Lightning Seeds achieved success with their debut single, the psychedelic hit "Pure", which reached the top 20 in the UK, and the top 40 of the Billboard Hot 100 in the United States. Both "Pure" and followup single "All I Want" also reached the Modern Rock Tracks top 10.

Broudie resumed his production career after the success of the first Lightning Seeds album, but returned to songwriting in 1991 and moved labels from Rough Trade to Virgin. He then resumed his Lightning Seeds recording career, drafting Simon Rogers as his studio partner in production, arrangements, and instrumentation. Rogers, who had also helped with programming on the first Lightning Seeds album, would continue as Broudie's in-studio partner throughout the rest of the Lightning Seeds' career.

The album Sense (1992) featured the song "The Life of Riley", written by Broudie for his son, which reached No. 28 on the UK Singles Chart. An instrumental version of the song later became better known as the BBC TV theme for the Goal of the Month competition. The album Sense would mark Broudie's first Lightning Seeds songwriting collaborations with former Specials singer Terry Hall.

=== 1994–1998: Touring years ===
Broudie signed the Lightning Seeds to Epic Records, put other projects on hold and embarked on a touring schedule:

I'd been wanting to perform live again for some time and this was the first time I found myself talking to somebody at a record company who believed in Lightning Seeds

By the end of 1993 Broudie had finished the Jollification (1994) album, which included contributions from Terry Hall, Alison Moyet and Ian McNabb. The promotional tour began in August 1994 with a consistently changing line up over the years with Broudie the only constant. The tour benefitted from the success of the second single from the album, "Change", which reached No. 13 in the UK Singles Charts, becoming the band's second UK top 20 hit. The song was also featured on the soundtrack for the hit movie Clueless. The album Jollification became a critical success and the singles taken from this album, "Lucky You", "Marvellous" and "Perfect" made noticeable impact. Mark Farrow's album cover featured the use of computer graphics to create an enormous strawberry, its seeds depicted with superimposed human faces, while the singles' covers featured different variations on this theme.

During this period a number of songs were recorded at a private river barge studio located at Eel Pie Studios, then owned by Pete Townshend for the fourth studio album Dizzy Heights. The single "Ready or Not" was released ahead of the album and reached No. 20 in the UK Singles chart.

In 1996, The Football Association commissioned Broudie to write an England song for the upcoming Euro '96 football tournament. Broudie agreed on the condition that comedians Frank Skinner and David Baddiel, who had presented the late-night television show Fantasy Football League participated. The resulting song, "Three Lions", became a No. 1 on the UK Singles Chart and was adopted as a football chant, not only in the UK but also in countries such as Germany, where the single and accompanying video reached No. 16 in their charts.

In 1997, Lightning Seeds headlined the Hillsborough Justice Concert, which was held at the Liverpool Anfield stadium to raise fund for the families in their struggle for justice.

During this period the band achieved three more UK Top 20 hits, including a cover version of the Turtles' "You Showed Me", which became their highest-charting hit other than "Three Lions" when it reached No. 8.

1997 gave the Lightning Seeds international exposure with "You Showed Me" included on the Austin Powers: International Man of Mystery soundtrack. The release of greatest hits compilation Like You Do... Best of The Lightning Seeds and a UK promotional tour followed. In 1998, Broudie, Baddiel & Skinner reworked and recorded an updated version of their hit football anthem for the FIFA World Cup in France. "3 Lions '98" reached No. 1 in the UK Singles Chart, becoming the first song to top the charts on two occasions with different sets of lyrics. In 1998, the Lightning Seeds also performed on the Main Stage at both the Glastonbury Festival and the V Festival in the UK.

=== 1999–2005: Tilt and hiatus ===
Their album Tilt (1999) was dance-oriented and featured collaborations with Stephen Jones. The single "Life's Too Short" was heralded by BBC Radio 1 DJ Chris Moyles as "one of the band's strongest singles to date" and rose to No. 27 in the UK Singles Chart.

=== 2006–present ===
The band's second greatest hits album The Very Best of the Lightning Seeds was released on 12 June 2006, followed by the re-release of "Three Lions", which rose to No. 9 in the UK Singles Chart.

In 2009, the band released their sixth studio album, Four Winds, and returned to touring in April 2010 after a ten-year hiatus.

In 2014, the songs and career of Ian Broudie were celebrated in a concert held at the Liverpool Philharmonic Hall, featuring the Royal Liverpool Philharmonic orchestra and performances by Ian McCulloch (Echo And The Bunnymen), Miles Kane (the Last Shadow Puppets), Terry Hall (the Specials), James Skelly (the Coral) and Broudie himself with a band featuring musicians Sean Payne (the Zutons), Bill Ryder Jones and Nick Power (the Coral) and Broudie's son, Riley. The event was filmed but is yet to be released.

On 22 August 2014, the Lightning Seeds were joined by the Royal Philharmonic Orchestra in Liverpool's Sefton Park for a show in front of 30,000 people, reprising the Philharmonic show without the special guests.

In December 2016, the Lightning Seeds supported Madness on their British pre-Christmas arena tour.

In June 2018, the single "Three Lions" re-entered the UK chart and reached number one on the chart dated 19 July 2018, celebrating the progress of England national football team at the 2018 FIFA World Cup, with the phrase "it's coming home" featuring heavily on social media and television.

A new single, "Sunshine", was released on 15 June 2022. Alongside the new song "Emily Smiles" it was taken from the studio album See You in the Stars, which was released in October 2022.

In 2023, the Lightning Seeds opened the Glastonbury Festival's "Other Stage". They also supported Madness on tour once again that year.

== Band members ==
- Ian Broudie – vocals, lead guitar (1989–present)
- Martyn Campbell – bass, backing vocals (1994–present)
- Riley Broudie – rhythm guitar (2009–present)
- Adele Emmas – keyboards, backing vocals (2019–present)
- Jim Sharrock – drums, backing vocals (2016–present)
- Tim Cunningham – saxophone, clarinet (2019–present)

Former members

- Ali Kane – keyboards (1994–1996)
- Angie Pollock – keyboards, backing vocals (1996–2000, 2009)
- Chris Sharrock – drums (1994–1997)
- James Bagshaw – keyboards (2010)
- Keith York – drums (1997–1998)
- Mathew Priest – drums (1997)
- Paolo Ruiu – bass (2006)
- Paul Hemmings – guitar (1994–1998)
- Raife Burchell – drums (2010)
- Rob Allum – drums (2009–2010)
- Sean Payne – drums (2011–2012)
- Simon Rogers – guitar, bass, keyboards (1992–2000)
- Zak Starkey – drums (1998–2000)
- Abi Harding – saxophone, keyboards, backing vocals (2016–2018)

== Discography ==
- Cloudcuckooland (1990)
- Sense (1992)
- Jollification (1994)
- Dizzy Heights (1996)
- Tilt (1999)
- Four Winds (2009)
- See You in the Stars (2022)
