= Three Lions (song) =

1996 single by David Baddiel, Frank Skinner, and the Lightning Seeds

Single by Baddiel, Skinner and the Lightning Seeds

from the album The Beautiful Game – The Official Album of Euro '96
- Released: 20 May 1996
- Genre: Britpop
- Length: 3:44
- Label: Epic (1997, 2002); BMG (2006)
- Composer: Ian Broudie
- Lyricists: David Baddiel; Frank Skinner
- Producers: Ian Broudie; Simon Rogers; Jon Thoday; Dave Bascombe

The Lightning Seeds singles chronology
"Ready or Not" (1995)	"Three Lions" (1996)	"What If..." (1996)

Audio sample
- Sample of "Three Lions" by Baddiel, Skinner and the Lightning Seeds: file; help

Music video
- "Three Lions" on YouTube

"Three Lions" is a song by the English comedians David Baddiel and Frank Skinner and the rock band the Lightning Seeds. It was released on 20 May 1996 through Epic Records to mark the England football team's participation in that year's UEFA European Championship, which England was hosting.

The music was written by the Lightning Seeds singer, Ian Broudie, while Baddiel and Skinner—presenters of the football comedy show Fantasy Football League—provided the lyrics. All three provided vocals. The title comes from the England team emblem.

Both the original version of "Three Lions" and the updated "Three Lions '98" reached number one on the UK singles chart. It regularly reappears in the UK singles chart around major football tournaments involving the England team. Its music video was directed by Pedro Romhanyi.

The song has been described as the de facto "anthem" of English football since 1996. Its chorus, with the refrain "It's coming home", has become a popular chant for fans at England games.

== Writing ==
The Football Association (FA) asked the Lightning Seeds songwriter, Ian Broudie, to compose a song for the 1996 UEFA European Football Championship. He composed a melody he felt would make a good football chant, and asked the comedians Frank Skinner and David Baddiel, presenters of the football comedy show Fantasy Football League, to write the lyric. Broudie declined the FA's offer to have football players sing, saying he did not want the song to be "England-istic" or nationalistic. He said it was more about "being a football fan, which, for 90% of the time, is losing".

According to Skinner's autobiography, the original lyric included the line "Butcher ready for war" instead of "Bobby belting the ball". The line was a reference to a notorious World Cup qualifier against Sweden in 1989, when the defender Terry Butcher played despite his head bleeding profusely for much of the match. Baddiel later revealed a handwritten copy of the lyrics on Twitter with "Terry Butcher at war" shown as the replaced lyric. The FA requested the line be changed to avoid suggestions of hooliganism imagery. The "ready for war" motif was later used in the 1998 version of the song, attributed to Paul Ince. The crowd noise in the intro is Brøndby fans recorded by Broudie at Anfield during a UEFA Cup tie in October 1995.

== Themes ==
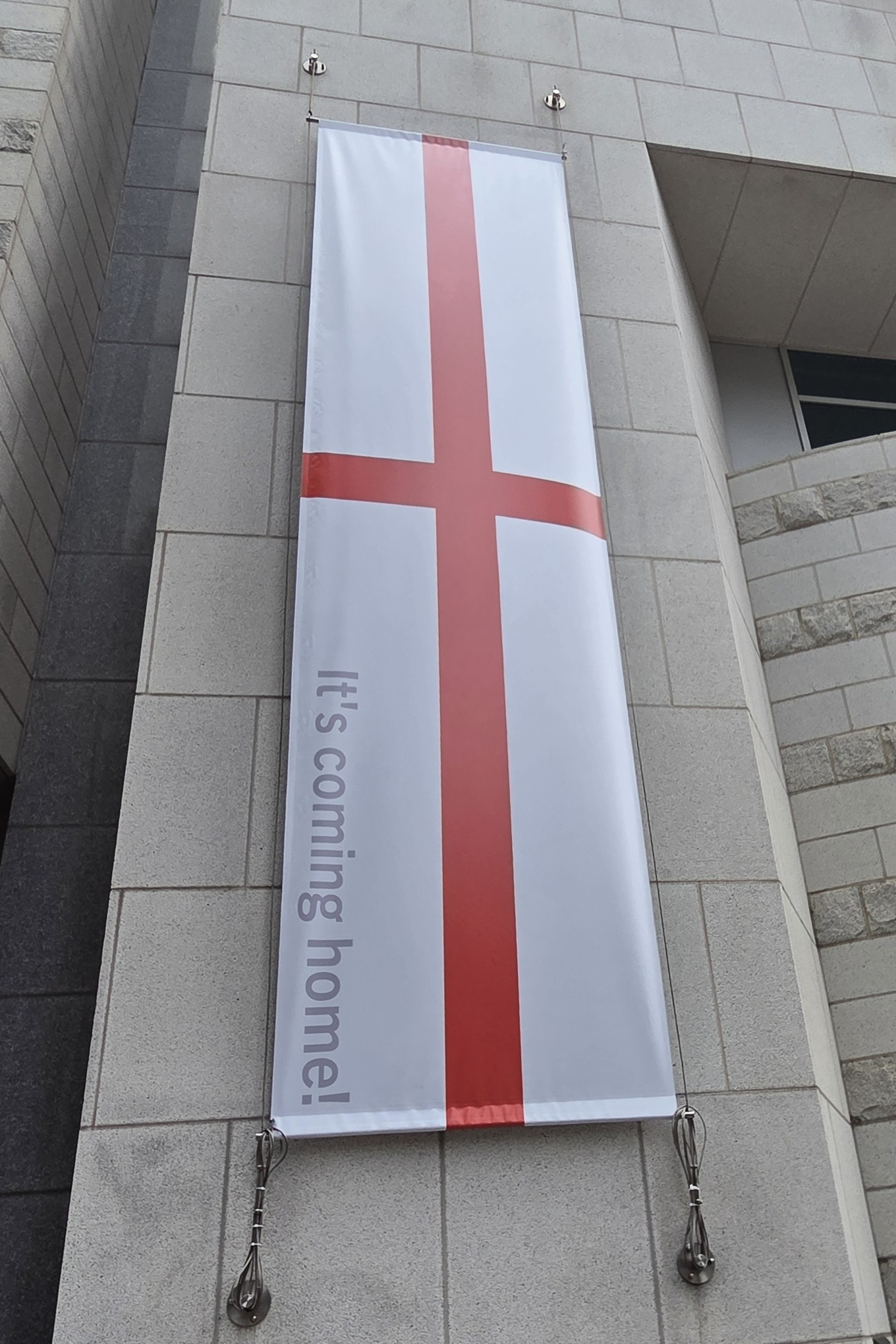
"It's coming home" has become a popular chant for England's football fans.

The title refers to the three lions on the England team crest. The chorus lyric, "it's coming home", reflected the fact that Euro 1996 was the first football competition England had hosted since the 1966 FIFA World Cup. It has evolved to include the concept of the cup returning to England, football's homeland.

The song references players who played in the 1966 World Cup winning team. The references include:

- "That tackle by Moore": Bobby Moore's tackle of Jairzinho in a 1970 World Cup match against Brazil.
- "When Lineker scored": Gary Lineker's goal against West Germany in a 1990 World Cup semi-final.
- "Bobby belting the ball": Bobby Charlton's goal against Mexico in a 1966 World Cup group match.
- "Nobby dancing": Nobby Stiles dancing with the Jules Rimet Trophy after England won the 1966 FIFA World Cup.

Unlike most football songs, the lyrics speak not of unbounded optimism for victory but instead of how, since England's victory in the 1966 FIFA World Cup, every tournament has ended in dashed hopes. However, the failures have not dampened the feeling that England could succeed again ("Three lions on a shirt / Jules Rimet still gleaming / Thirty years of hurt / never stopped me dreaming"). Baddiel said the song was about magical thinking: "About assuming we are going to lose, reasonably, based on experience, but hoping that somehow we won't."

Despite the failures of the past, each tournament is greeted with fresh hopes that this might be the year they do it again: "I know that was then, but it could be again", and the song's chorus proclaimed that "It's coming home, it's coming home, it's coming, football's coming home" which refers, like the tournament's slogan, "Football comes home", to the invention of the modern game in England. Following England's success at the 2022 Women's Euro, Baddiel said: "I'm very happy to think the song would, in a way, be put to bed."

== Reception ==
Mark Roland from Melody Maker wrote, "It has been left to Ian Broudie to come up with a curiously Slade-esque theme to celebrate the impending Championships. Once you have heard it a couple of time, you'll want to mace anyone who sings it." In December 1996, Melody Maker ranked "Three Lions" number 44 in their list of "Singles of the Year", adding, "The best footie anthem of all time, and you know it. Buoyant, blissful and brilliant, until that irritating bit at the end." Tom Ewing, in the Freaky Trigger blog Popular, wrote: "The song (...) is a bluffer’s guide to fandom. (...) [It's also] a superior Britpop song, whatever else it is – too earnest and not as sharp or funny as the genre’s best, but Skinner and Baddiel’s rough voices have a folksy conviction and charm which a lot of minor Britpop bands lacked, and the Lightning Seeds could always sell a sappy tune."

== Commercial reception ==
The Britpop phenomenon was at its peak in 1996, and the Lightning Seeds were one of its leading acts, so their involvement gave the song very wide appeal. It reached number one on the singles chart, and as England progressed to the semi-finals, stadiums around the country echoed to the sound of fans singing the song after English victories over Scotland, the Netherlands and Spain. It was so popular that even other teams liked it. England faced Germany in the semi-finals, and Jürgen Klinsmann said later that the Germans were singing the song themselves on the way to the stadium, and the German team and the crowd sang the song as they paraded the trophy on the Römer balcony in Frankfurt. The single as a result reached number 49 on the German Singles Chart. Broudie said he was shocked to hear German fans singing the song after beating England at Euro 96. The song was later sung by Germany fans during their team's first appearance at the new Wembley in 2007.

The original version still receives regular airplay in England around the time of major international football tournaments. It has been adopted as a terrace chant and is occasionally sung by fans at England international matches today. When it was sung by England fans at the 2006 World Cup after England took the lead against Paraguay, the commentator John Motson said, "As football songs go, 'Three Lions' is certainly the best." The song has sold 1.6 million copies in the UK as of June 2018.

The song reached number one on the UK singles chart again in 2018 following England reaching the semi-finals of the 2018 FIFA World Cup, with the line "it's coming home" featuring heavily on social media. In doing so, it became the first song in history to have four separate stints at number one in the UK. By the following week, following England's semi-final defeat by Croatia, and elimination from the tournament, the single had fallen to number 97, setting what was at the time a record for the fastest ever descent from the top of the charts.

== Music video ==
Pedro Romhanyi directed the music video. Romhanyi said that while Skinner and Baddiel are comedians, they took the recording seriously, as "this is not about making a pop video; it's about doing something that's good for football". Baddiel recalled that Romhanyi insisted that the music video feel "homely", opening with Skinner and Baddiel making tea while watching television at home.

The video also features archival footage and images of the referenced 1966 and later teams, featuring, for example, Bobby Moore, Nobby Stiles, and Gary Lineker. The contemporary pub scene was filmed at the Queen of the Isle in London, which was demolished in 2004. The pub scene includes a cameo by the 1966 team member Geoff Hurst, who was the first player to score a hat-trick in a World Cup final.

== Track listing ==
1. "Three Lions" – 3:44
2. "Three Lions" (Jules Rimet extended mix) – 6:14
3. "Three Lions" (karaoke version) – 3:45

== Charts ==
=== Weekly charts ===
Chart (1996)	Peak position
Europe (Eurochart Hot 100)	8
Germany (GfK)	49
Iceland (Íslenski Listinn Topp 40)	27
Ireland (IRMA)	9
Israel (IBA)	36
Norway (VG-lista)	7
Scotland Singles (Official Charts)	6
UK Singles (Official Charts)	1

Chart (2002)	Peak position
Europe (Eurochart Hot 100)	58
Scotland Singles (Official Charts)	36
UK Singles (OCC)	16

Chart (2006)	Peak position
Scotland Singles (Official Charts)	52
UK Singles (OCC)	9

Chart (2008)	Peak position
Switzerland (Schweizer Hitparade)	44

Chart (2010)	Peak position
Scotland Singles (Official Charts)	43
UK Singles (OCC)	10

Chart (2014)	Peak position
Scotland Singles (Official Charts)	97
UK Singles (OCC)	27

Chart (2018)	Peak position
Ireland (IRMA)	65
Scotland Singles (Official Charts)	5
UK Singles (OCC)	1

Chart (2021)	Peak position
UK Singles (OCC)	4

Chart (2022)	Peak position
UK Singles (OCC)	20

Chart (2024)	Peak position
UK Singles (OCC)	8

Chart (2026)	Peak position
UK Singles (OCC)	3

=== Year-end charts ===
Chart (1996)	Position
Europe (Eurochart Hot 100)	92
UK Singles (OCC)	7

Chart (2006)	Position
UK Singles (OCC)	166

== Certifications ==
Region	Certification	Certified units/sales
United Kingdom (BPI)	2× Platinum	1,200,000^{‡}
^{‡} Sales+streaming figures based on certification alone.

== "3 Lions '98" ==
"3 Lions '98"

Single by Baddiel, Skinner and the Lightning Seeds
- Released: 8 June 1998
- Recorded: 1998
- Genre: Alternative rock; Britpop
- Length: 3:58
- Label: Epic
- Composer: Ian Broudie
- Lyricists: David Baddiel; Frank Skinner
- Producers: Ian Broudie; Simon Rogers; Dave Bascombe

The Lightning Seeds singles chronology
"What You Say" (1997)	"3 Lions '98" (1998)	"Life's Too Short" (1999)

Music video
- "3 Lions '98" on YouTube

England lost in a penalty shoot-out against Germany in 1996, so the song's lyrics rang true once again. It was subsequently re-recorded with different lyrics (under the title "3 Lions '98") as an unofficial anthem for England's 1998 World Cup campaign (unlike in 1996, when it was the "official song of the England football team") and landed the number-one spot in the singles chart for a second time, beating the official England song "(How Does It Feel to Be) On Top of the World?" by England United and the other unofficial England song "Vindaloo" by Fat Les to the top spot by eight places.

This version of the song begins with the sound of stadium crowds singing the original chorus. It then samples Jonathan Pearce's commentary of the decisive penalty miss by England's Gareth Southgate in a shoot-out with Germany, where England were eliminated at the semi-final stage. Pearce's commentary of earlier rounds of the tournament was also used later in the song.

While the 1996 "Three Lions" song drew on various memorable moments from the previous 30 years, the 1998 version reflected on the Euro 96 tournament and its entry alongside previous disappointments, as well as the team's performance in qualifying for the 1998 World Cup. The verse mentioning specific players focused this time on the then-current England squad:

- Paul Ince – "Ince ready for war" – his performance against Italy in a crucial qualifier for that year's World Cup
- Paul Gascoigne – "Gazza good as before" – the long-awaited return of his 1990 World Cup form in Euro 96, particularly his goal against Scotland
- Alan Shearer – "Shearer certain to score" – with five goals, he had been the top scorer of Euro 96, despite a poor run of form in internationals before the tournament
- Stuart Pearce – "And Psycho screaming" – his primal celebration after scoring a penalty in the Euro 96 quarter-final shoot-out against Spain, which lifted the burden he had felt after failing to score in the semi-final shoot-out at the 1990 World Cup

Amid much controversy, neither Gascoigne nor Pearce were selected for England's 1998 World Cup squad, which was not announced until some time after the song had been recorded.

As well as a karaoke version of the new song, the single featured a song called "Tout est Possible" (French for "Anything is Possible") as a B-side. The song was largely composed of a recurring chorus, samples from commentators and pundits, and the occasional short verse. It also started with a French speech sample referring to "La Coupe du Monde" (The World Cup).

=== 1998 video ===
There was also a completely new video made for the 1998 version of the song again directed by Pedro Romhanyi. The storyline is different as the trio are now travelling on a motor coach to France with a group of England fans for the 1998 World Cup. The video later portrays a match between the English fans and their German equivalents, most of whom have the name "Kuntz" printed on the back of their football shirts (except for one, who instead has "Klinsmann"). German player Stefan Kuntz had played an instrumental part in Germany's semi-final victory over England at Wembley in 1996, but his name is similar to the disparaging vulgarity "cunts"; the segment was often cut by broadcasters. Baddiel and Skinner had previously mocked Kuntz's name on their Fantasy Football television programme.

The video also featured cameo appearances from Geoff Hurst (who also made a cameo in the music video for the original song in 1996), John Regis, Robbie Williams and Chris Evans. The archival footage was also updated.

=== Charts ===
==== Weekly charts ====
Chart (1998)	Peak position
Europe (Eurochart Hot 100)	5
Germany (GfK)	14
Ireland (IRMA)	14
Norway (VG-lista)	5
Scotland Singles (Official Charts)	14
UK Singles (OCC)	1

==== Year-end charts ====
Chart (1998)	Position
UK Singles (OCC)	14

=== Certifications ===
Region	Certification	Certified units/sales
United Kingdom (BPI)	Platinum	600,000^{^}
^{^} Shipments figures based on certification alone.

== "Three Lions 2010" by the Squad ==
"Three Lions 2010"

Single by The Squad

from the album England The Album 2010
- Released: 17 May 2010
- Recorded: 2010
- Genre: Britpop with opera and choir music
- Label: EMI
- Composer: Ian Broudie
- Lyricists: David Baddiel; Frank Skinner
- Producer: Trevor Horn

Although Frank Skinner had dismissed the possibility in early 2010, Skinner, Baddiel and Broudie were joined by Robbie Williams and comedian/actor Russell Brand under the name the Squad for a new version of the song for the 2010 FIFA World Cup, produced by Trevor Horn. The song features added vocals from the ACM Gospel Choir, a soprano (Olivia Safe) and commentator John Motson. It entered the UK Singles Chart at number 21. The song can be found on England The Album 2010.

=== Track listing ===
- CD single
1. "Three Lions" (2010 version) – 4:17
2. "Three Lions" (original version) – 3:36
- Digital download
1. "Three Lions" (2010 version) – 4:17
2. "Three Lions" (2010 edit) – 3:37
- Asda CD single
1. "Three Lions" (2010 version) – 4:17
2. "Three Lions" (2010 Asda choir version) – 4:16

=== Charts ===
Chart (2010)	Peak position
Scotland Singles (Official Charts)	76
UK Singles (Official Charts)	21

== "Three Lions (Lionesses Version)" ==
In summer 2022, the song was rewritten slightly as England hosted UEFA Women's Euro 2022 and the England women's team made the final against Germany, which they won 2–1 in extra time to win the Lionesses' first major trophy and England's first major football trophy (men's or women's) since the 1966 World Cup. The Lightning Seeds and Baddiel performed the new version with Chelcee Grimes and retired Lionesses Fara Williams, Rachel Yankey, Faye White, Rachel Brown-Finnis and Anita Asante at the Electric Ballroom in Camden with Skinner in attendance. This time, references were to current England women's players:

- Ellen White – "Ellen White standing tall" – she scored two goals at what was eventually her final international tournament, having already become England's all-time female leading goalscorer before the tournament.
- Alessia Russo – "Russo's ready to score" – she scored four goals in the tournament, including a backheel goal in the semi-final against Sweden at Bramall Lane that went between Swedish goalkeeper Hedvig Lindahl's legs and became a FIFA Puskás Award nominee.
- Georgia Stanway – "Stanway kicking the ball" – she scored the winning goal in the quarter-final against Spain at Falmer Stadium in extra time with a shot from outside the box.
- Beth Mead – "And Beth Mead screaming" – she was named both player of the tournament and top scorer with six goals and five assists and later went on to become the first female footballer to win the BBC Sports Personality of the Year Award.

Two other verses were added: "Now is the time, the Lionesses can shine…" and "Lionesses roar, a squad we can believe in / This England team has soared, no more need for dreaming."

In a further reference to the song, at full time in extra time of the final, commentator Vicki Sparks exclaimed on BBC Radio 5 Live's radio call, "No more years of hurt! No more need for dreaming, because dreams have become reality at Wembley!" before the song began playing over the Wembley speakers.

== "Three Lions (It's Coming Home for Christmas)" ==
"Three Lions (It's Coming Home for Christmas)"

Single by Baddiel, Skinner and The Lightning Seeds
- Released: 18 November 2022
- Recorded: 2022
- Genre: Britpop; Christmas
- Length: 4:09
- Label: Sony Music UK
- Composer: Ian Broudie
- Lyricists: David Baddiel; Frank Skinner

Music video
- "Three Lions (It's Coming Home for Christmas)" on YouTube

In October 2022, Skinner and Broudie confirmed that a new version of the song would be released in time for the 2022 FIFA World Cup in Qatar. The singer noted that the Lionesses' Euro 2022 win made him consider remaking the song, noting that the track might be Christmas-themed due to the World Cup's close proximity to Christmas.

On 18 November 2022, Baddiel, Skinner and The Lightning Seeds released the song, titled "Three Lions (It's Coming Home for Christmas)". Skinner explained that they re-recorded it to take advantage of the "tacky" novelty of a Christmas-themed football song, stating that "in maths two negatives make a positive, so we think there's so much tacky in this that it's going to be a classic." The rewritten lyrics mention the England women's team winning the Women's Euros in July, updating the original's "30 years of hurt" to be "56 years of hurt, for the men's game" and adding "20 weeks of hurt, for the women's game, obviously", though the women's team had played several matches during those weeks and ended the year unbeaten. Baddiel and Skinner also make fun of the song itself, singing "a football Christmas song, not at all demeaning". Other lyrics include criticism of the choice to host in Qatar, though also the ironic suggestion that the men's team may be more successful playing in a different month, and the deliberate pronunciation of "Jules" (as in Jules Rimet Trophy) as the similar "Yule".

An accompanying music video was released, combining the original music video with modern footage. Baddiel, Skinner and Broudie visit their past selves and prepare for Christmas. The archive footage of the original music video is replaced with footage of the women's team memorably interrupting manager Sarina Wiegman's post-Euro final press conference to sing and dance to the original song, and of the men's team playing in the Euro 2020 final and their reactions to losing. Geoff Hurst made a cameo, as he had in the original, now dressed as Father Christmas and joined by female Euro-winning players Bethany England and Jess Carter.

=== Charts ===
Chart (2022)	Peak position
UK Singles (Official Charts)	20

== Re-issues ==
"3 Lions '98" was re-released for the World Cup in 2002, and again on 5 June 2006 for the World Cup 2006 in Germany. It charted at number nine on the UK Singles Chart in 2006. The 2006 re-release was a DualDisc version with both the original version of "Three Lions" and "3 Lions '98" on the CD side and the music videos for the two songs on the DVD side. In 2021, Sony re-issued the two versions on a seven-inch vinyl as "3 Lions: Football's Coming Home - 25th Anniversary Edition", with "Three Lions" on one side listed as The First Half (rather than the A-side) and "3 Lions '98" on the other side, listed as The Second Half (rather than the B-side or double A-side).

== Covers and other uses ==
In autumn of 1996, Labour opposition leader Tony Blair addressed his party's conference with the quote "Seventeen years of hurt, never stopped us dreaming, Labour's coming home", a play on words from the song's chorus and in reference to his confidence that Labour would return to power at the forthcoming general election, having been in the opposition since the Conservatives ousted them from government in 1979. When the election was held on 1 May 1997, Labour won by a landslide.

In 2016, a parody of the song, "Britain's Coming Home", was released in support of Brexit by UKIP member Mandy Boylett. Lyrics included "We're coming out, we're voting Leave... Believe in Britain coming home." and "They’ve taken all our fish and money through the years". The song went viral and became the target of public ridicule, though David Baddiel praised the song as "brilliantly naff".

In summer 2018, the song enjoyed a renaissance due to the England national team's performance in the 2018 FIFA World Cup, in which they reached the semi-finals, and this caused the song to reach number one on the UK Singles Chart. After Croatia eliminated England in the World Cup semi-final, Croatia's captain Luka Modrić said that his team had taken the song's refrain "It's coming home" as arrogance and disrespect which had additionally motivated them to win the match. In response, England manager Gareth Southgate among others stated the Croats misunderstand English humour.

In addition, the Barmy Army group of England cricket supporters adapted the song into "Three Lions and a Crown" ahead of the 2019 ICC Cricket World Cup, which England hosted and eventually won for their first ODI (50-over) World Cup championship.

During England's semi-final run at the 2018 World Cup in Russia, England supporters adapted the chorus of girl group Atomic Kitten's "Whole Again" into a chant that referenced "Three Lions" in honor of Gareth Southgate, who had become manager. Specifically, the chorus lines "Baby, you're the one / You still turn me on / You can make me whole again" were changed to "Southgate, you're the one / You still turn me on / Football's coming home again". Before England's quarter-final against Sweden, group member Natasha Hamilton shared a video of herself on Twitter singing the alternate lyrics. On 3 July 2021 during UEFA Euro 2020, Hamilton and fellow member Liz McClarnon then returned to perform the song with reworked lyrics including the existing alternate ones in front of chanting football fans at a watch party at Boxpark Croydon for England's quarter-final against Ukraine. On 6 July 2021, the day before England's semi-final against Denmark, the group – including Jenny Frost, who rejoined following a 13-year break to re-record – released an official full-length version of the adapted song called "Southgate You're the One (Football's Coming Home Again)" via Columbia Records UK.

During the Lionesses victory parade in London on 29 July 2025 following the UEFA Women's Euro 2025 final, the song was sung by fans.

== See also ==
- Royal arms of England
- Origins of the Three Lions emblem
- Coat of arms of the Football Association
