= Frank Skinner =

English comedian and television personality (born 1957)

Frank Skinner MBE
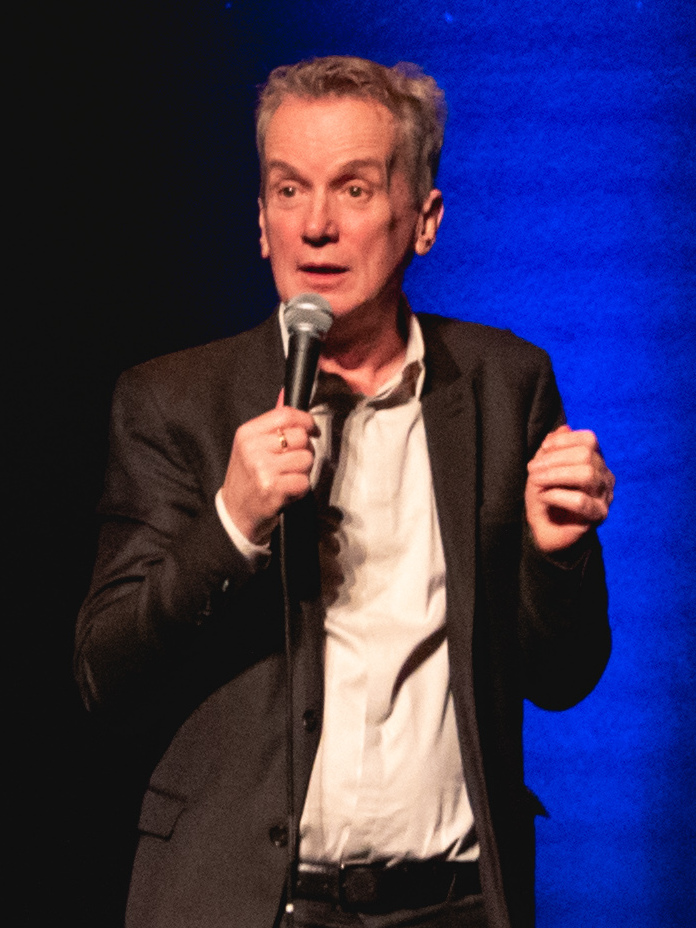
- Skinner in 2020
- Born: Christopher Graham Collins; 28 January 1957 (age 69); West Bromwich, Staffordshire, England
- Education: Birmingham Polytechnic (BA); University of Warwick (MA)
- Spouse: Cath Mason (m. 2025)
- Children: 1

Comedy career
- Years active: 1987–present
- Medium: Radio; stand-up; television
- Genres: Blue comedy; musical comedy; observational comedy
- Frank Skinner's voice from the BBC programme Desert Island Discs, 13 June 2010

Christopher Graham Collins (born 28 January 1957), known professionally as Frank Skinner, is an English comedian, actor, presenter and writer. At the 2001 British Comedy Awards, he was named Best Comedy Entertainment Personality. His television work includes Fantasy Football League from 1994 to 2004, The Frank Skinner Show from 1995 to 2005, Baddiel and Skinner Unplanned from 2000 to 2005, and Room 101 from 2012 to 2018. From 2009 to 2024 he hosted The Frank Skinner Show on Absolute Radio, broadcast live on Saturday mornings and released as a podcast. In October 2024 Skinner launched the Frank Off The Radio podcast, with the same crew as the radio show.

Along with David Baddiel, he provided vocals and wrote the lyrics for "Three Lions", the official song in collaboration with Liverpudlian indie band the Lightning Seeds, to mark the England national football team's participation in the 1996 European Championship (which was hosted in England); he also reprised his role to release two subsequent versions of the song for the England team's involvement in the 1998 FIFA World Cup and 2010 World Cup. The 1996 version is the only song ever to have four separate stints at number one in the UK singles chart with the same artists, the most recent coming in July 2018 following England reaching the semi-finals of the 2018 World Cup.

== Early life ==
Skinner was born on 28 January 1957 in West Bromwich, Staffordshire, England, and grew up in a council house in neighbouring Oldbury. He was the youngest of four children born to John Collins (1918–1990) and his wife Doris (1919–1989).

Skinner wrote in his autobiography that his father, who was born in West Cornforth, County Durham, played for Spennymoor United before the Second World War, and met his mother in a local pub after Spennymoor had played West Bromwich Albion in an FA Cup game in 1937. Club officials and historians could not find his father in their records.

Skinner attended Moat Farm Infant School from 1961 to 1964, St Hubert's Roman Catholic Junior School from 1964 to 1968, and then Oldbury Technical Secondary School from 1968 to 1973. He passed two O-levels in summer 1973 and took A-levels in English language and art, along with several O-level resits, at Oldbury Technical School Sixth Form. He subsequently took four A-levels (including English language and literature) at Warley College of Technology and graduated from Birmingham Polytechnic (now Birmingham City University) in 1981 with a degree in English. This was followed by a master's degree in English literature at the University of Warwick in Coventry the following year.

Despite his given first name of Christopher, his parents called him by his middle name Graham; all his friends referred to him, and some still do, as Chris. Skinner once explained that whenever someone called at his house to ask if "Chris" was there, his mother would say yes, only to then turn around and shout for "Graham". He adopted the stage name Frank Skinner when the actors' union Equity told him there was already a singer from Burnley on their books called Chris Collins. He took the name from a member of his late father's dominoes team.

== Career ==
After graduating, Skinner spent three-and-a-half years on unemployment benefit before finding work as a lecturer in English at Halesowen College. In 1987, he decided to give stand-up comedy a try on the side. Skinner performed his first stand-up gig in 1987 and made his television debut a year later. In 1990, he co-wrote and starred in the comedy variety show Packet of Three on Channel 4 but continued to see his reputation as a stand-up grow. Before becoming a full-time performer in 1989, he suffered a bout of influenza in September 1986 that made him give up drinking, and he remains a high-profile recovering alcoholic.

Skinner won the 1991 Perrier Award at the Edinburgh Fringe, beating Jack Dee and Eddie Izzard. He has worked with David Baddiel, notably on the popular late-night entertainment show Fantasy Football League from 1994 to 2004 and on Baddiel and Skinner Unplanned from 2000 to 2005. The duo also co-wrote and performed the football song "Three Lions" with the Lightning Seeds and the England national football team for Euro 1996, and re-recorded it for the 1998 World Cup. The song reached #1 in the UK charts both times. In 2001, he released his autobiography Frank Skinner by Frank Skinner, which became a bestseller. The accompanying TV show, Frank Skinner on Frank Skinner, in which Skinner showed where he lived as a child and interviews with Skinner, his friends and family members, was recorded and shown on ITV in 2001. In July 2018, "Three Lions" re-entered the charts at number 1. Fans were celebrating the progress of England at the 2018 FIFA World Cup, with the phrase "it's coming home" featuring heavily on social media and television.

Skinner is a fan of Elvis Presley, and in 1998, took part in a documentary titled A Little Bit of Elvis. He paid over £11,000 at auction for a shirt which he believed was worn by Presley at his famous 1956 Tupelo concert. Skinner visited the US to find out if the shirt was the genuine article. After a slightly awkward conversation with Dave Hebler, Presley's bodyguard, it appeared the shirt did once belong to Presley, but it was not worn at the concert.

In 1999, Skinner wrote a script for a sitcom Heavy Revie, where he played Frank, a former heavy metal rock-star who has gone off the boil, and is forced by his manager to record with a boy band. A pilot was taped, but the series wasn't picked up.

From 1995 to 1998, Skinner had his own chat show on BBC One, which ended when the BBC refused to meet pay demands of a reported £20 million. After a short break, the show found a new home at ITV in 1999, where it ran until late 2005. He has appeared in a number of self-written sitcoms, including Blue Heaven (1994) and Shane (2004).

In 2000, Skinner appeared as Buttons in the ITV Panto adaptation of Cinderella. In 2003, he was listed in The Observer as one of the 50 funniest acts in British comedy. In 2005, Skinner announced he was going to leave behind his television work in favour of returning to the stand-up comedy circuit. A second series of Shane had been made, but never shown.

In February 2006, Skinner received an honorary degree from the University of Central England (now Birmingham City University). Skinner and David Baddiel covered the 2006 FIFA World Cup by podcast for The Times. The podcasts received a nomination for the 2007 Sony Radio Academy Awards.

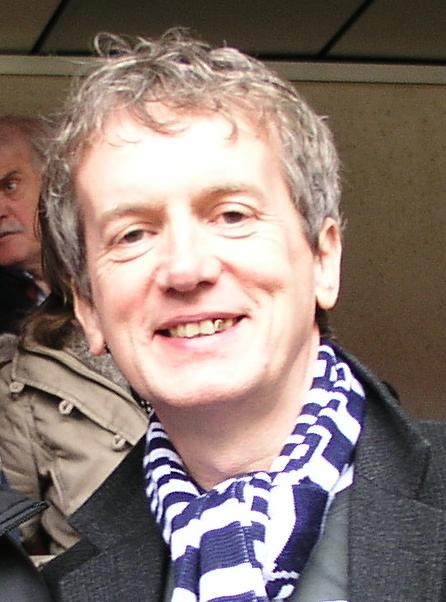
Skinner at Wembley Stadium in 2008

In 2007, Skinner performed a new live stand-up tour, his first for 10 years, starting at a warm-up gig at the Swindon Arts Centre, continuing through to the Edinburgh Festival for two weeks at The Pleasance, the venue where he won the Perrier Award, and a 69 date national tour including three sold-out homecoming performances at the National Indoor Arena in Birmingham in the autumn.

In November 2008, after senior broadcasting figures such as ITV chairman Michael Grade and presenter Terry Wogan called for TV to reduce its use of vulgar language, Skinner decided to experiment with removing swear words altogether from his stand-up live act, although he said it would be a shame if 'clever swearing' was lost. He also stood in for an ill Paul Merton as a team captain on 21 November edition of Have I Got News for You.

From March 2009, Skinner started to present the Saturday Morning Breakfast Show on Absolute Radio.

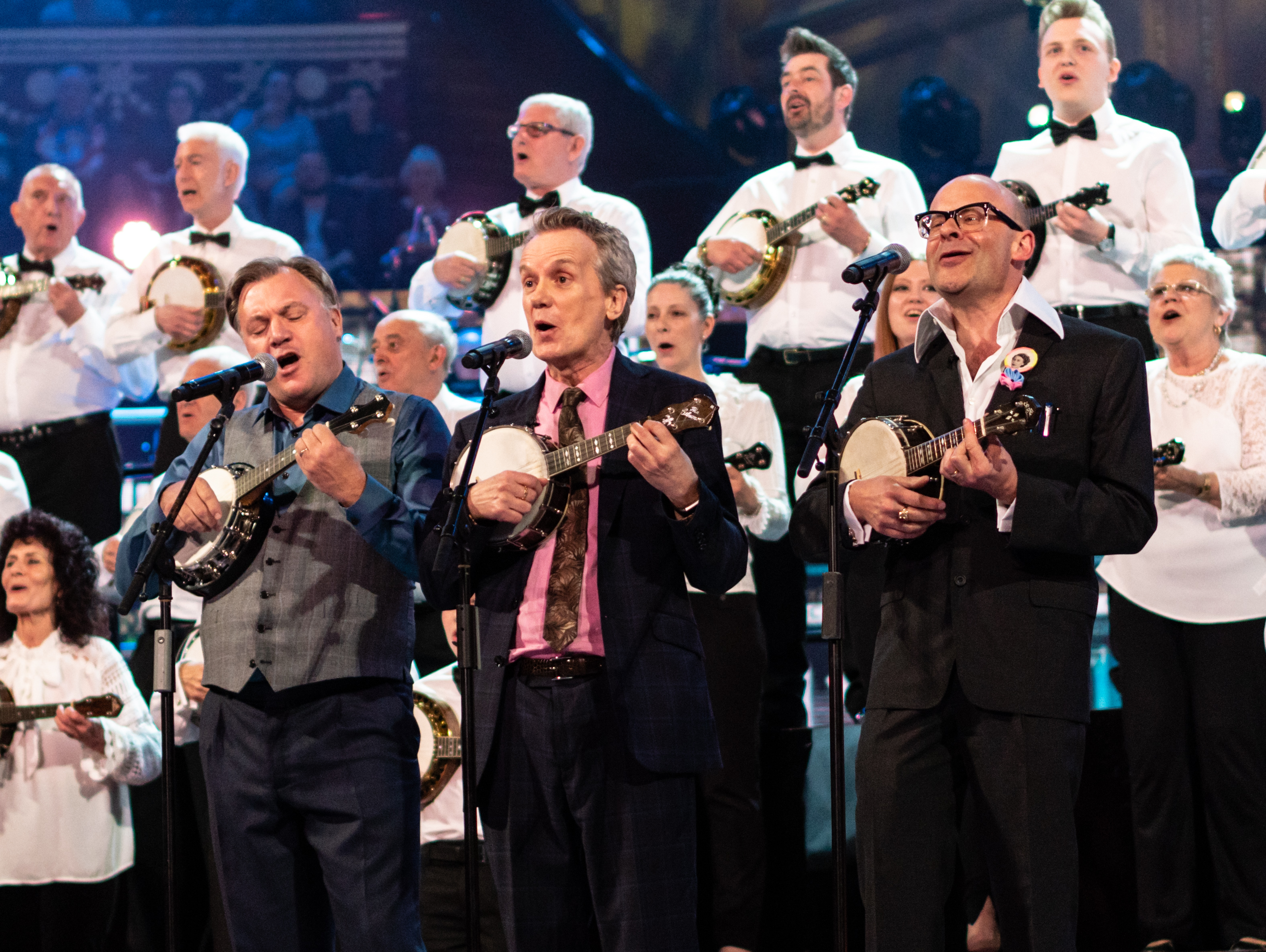
Skinner playing with the George Formby Society in 2018

Skinner plays the banjo ukulele and in 2010, he contributed ukulele parts to a song by Fairport Convention called "Ukulele Central" which featured on their album Festival Bell. A great admirer of George Formby, he hosted a BBC Four TV documentary, Frank Skinner on George Formby, which aired on 27 October 2011.

In 2011, Skinner wrote and performed a Radio 4 comedy series, Don't Start, with Katherine Parkinson. Each episode was based on an argument between Skinner's character Neil and Neil's girlfriend Kim. Skinner said each episode was only 15 minutes as it was "too intense" to be any longer. Don't Start returned for a second series in 2012, and aired its third and final series in 2015-2016.

From 2012 to 2018, Skinner was the host of BBC show Room 101. In August 2013, he was a team captain on the BBC comedy show I Love My Country.

From 2013 to 2018, Skinner was a presenter for series one to five of the art competition show Artist of the Year.

A fan of Doctor Who, Skinner appeared alongside Peter Capaldi's Doctor in the 2014 episode Mummy on the Orient Express. He subsequently featured in the 2019 Big Finish Productions audio release The Sinestran Kill, the first episode of Doctor Who: The Fourth Doctor Adventures, Season 8.

In 2015, Skinner appeared in the inaugural series of Taskmaster. In an interview with Greg Davies and Alex Horne, Davies said that as the show was untried, there were some concerns about whether contestants "were going to be made fools of." Horne said that since the show was unscripted and contestants would just have to trust them, "that was a big step" of faith for people to make. Horne went on to say that Skinner's agreeing to be on the show was "a big moment". Skinner performed moderately well on the show, and ended up tying for second place.

In 2020 Skinner began a podcast, Frank Skinner's Poetry Podcast, in which he analyses and discusses his favourite poems.

Skinner was appointed Member of the Order of the British Empire (MBE) in the 2023 New Year Honours for services to entertainment.

Skinner took part in A Show for Gareth Richards at the Edinburgh Fringe Festival 2023, which was staged by fellow comedians Mark Simmons and Danny Ward to honour Richards's life after he died in a car-crash in April 2023. The show won the first Victoria Wood award at the Edinburgh Comedy Awards 2023 and raised almost £20,000 for Gareth's family.

In March 2024, Skinner's contract with Absolute Radio was not extended, ending 15 years of his Saturday morning show on the station in May 2024.

In October 2024, Skinner started a podcast, Frank Off The Radio, with a format similar to his previous Absolute Radio show and featuring the same fellow presenters.

In 2024, Skinner performed his show 30 Years of Dirt.

In 2025, Skinner appeared in the music video for the song 90 Seconds To Midnight by Hot Milk.

== Personal life ==
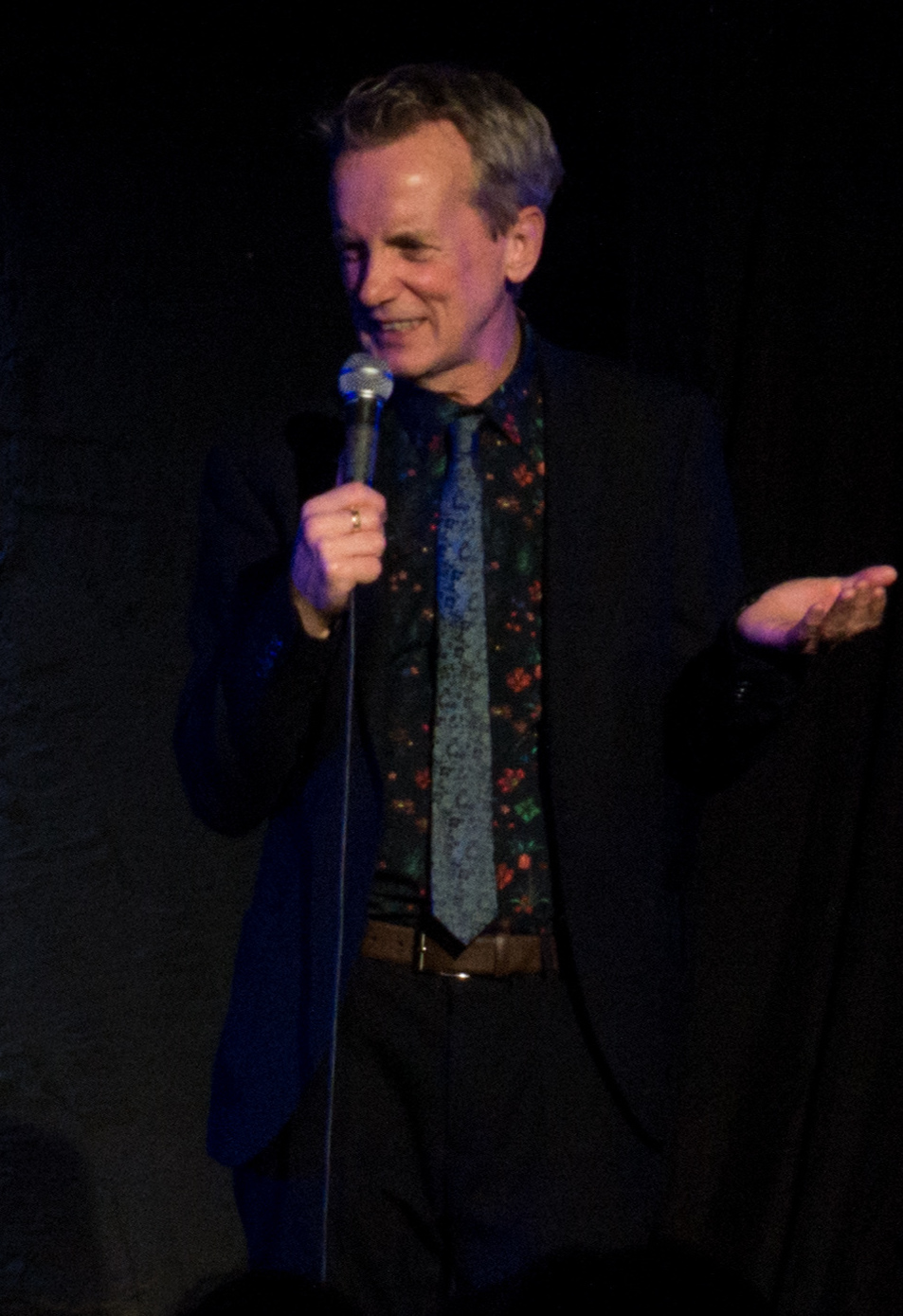
Skinner performing at the Soho Theatre in 2017

Skinner married in 1990, but the marriage was annulled shortly after. He and his longtime partner, Cath Mason, married at Camden Town Hall in May 2025 and have a son, who was born in 2012.

Raised Roman Catholic, Skinner reconnected with the faith in his 20s, and remains a practising Roman Catholic.

He is a supporter of West Bromwich Albion, and regularly attends games.

Skinner was a victim of the credit crunch in the late 2000s after investing in AIG, losing millions of pounds as a result. He eventually got most of the money back.

Skinner stopped drinking alcohol at age 29, having become concerned when he changed from having sherry for breakfast to Pernod. He started performing stand-up comedy shortly afterwards. He has said that he has never been able to replace the "white heat of joy" he got from alcohol and that his social life has never recovered from stopping drinking.

In July 2019, Skinner told The Times that he had always voted for the Labour Party, but said he would probably vote for the Green Party at the next election.

== Publications ==
=== Books ===
In October 2001, Skinner's autobiography, Frank Skinner by Frank Skinner, was published. In August 2009, he released a book centred on his return to stand-up after ten years: Frank Skinner on the Road: Love, Stand-up Comedy and the Queen of the Night.

In 2011, The Collected Wisdom of Frank Skinner; Dispatches from the Sofa was published. It consists of his weekly columns for The Times, written from 2009 to 2011.

In September 2020, he released a book, How to Enjoy Poetry.

Skinner, who is a practising Christian, released a book of prayers, A Comedian's Prayer Book, in 2021.

=== Stand-up VHS and DVDs ===
Title	Released	Notes
Live	5 October 1992	Live at London's Bloomsbury Theatre
Live at the Apollo	1994	Live at London's Apollo Theatre
Live at the Palladium	14 October 1996	Live at London's Palladium Theatre
Live in Birmingham	16 November 1998	Live at Birmingham's Hippodrome Theatre
Stand-Up! Live from Birmingham's National Indoor Arena	10 November 2008	Live at Birmingham's National Indoor Arena
Live – Man in a Suit	1 December 2014	Live at London's Leicester Square Theatre
