= Pure (song) =

1989 single by the Lightning Seeds

Single by Lightning Seeds

from the album Cloudcuckooland
- Released: 5 June 1989
- Length: 3:45
- Label: Ghetto
- Songwriter: Ian Broudie
- Producer: Ian Broudie

Lightning Seeds singles chronology
"Pure" (1989)	"All I Want" (1989)

"Pure" is a song by British music group the Lightning Seeds, released in June 1989 by label Ghetto, as the first single from their debut album, Cloudcuckooland (1990). The song is both written and produced by group member Ian Broudie and it peaked at No. 16 in the UK. The track is also the band's sole entry on the US Billboard Hot 100 and Cash Box Top 100's top 40 charts, peaking at No. 29 and 31. And it became the first hit for the band on the Billboard Modern Rock Tracks chart as well, peaking at No. 8 in May 1990. "Pure" was featured prominently in the movie What Happens Later (2023).

== Background ==
The first Lightning Seeds single release, "Pure" is significant in that it was the first song Ian Broudie had "completely written and sung, ever". It was when producing a track for the Pale Fountains that Broudie was offered a chance to release some of his own material. He was originally apprehensive:

I didn't think that many people would be interested if I'm going to be honest, I suppose I didn't have the confidence really and I wasn't in a band but I did want to put my music out and get it heard.

— Ian Broudie

Nonetheless, Broudie proceeded to record "Pure" at a studio in Kirkby. 200 copies of the single were originally pressed, but after some radio play and attention at The Haçienda, the song soon sprang to mainstream consciousness.

== Charts ==
Weekly chart performance for "Pure"
Chart (1989–1990)	Peak position
Australia (ARIA)	92
Israel (IBA)	11
UK Singles (Official Charts)	16
US Billboard Hot 100	31
US Modern Rock Tracks (Billboard)	8
US Cash Box Top 100	29

== Certifications ==
Region	Certification	Certified units/sales
United Kingdom (BPI)	Silver	200,000^{‡}
^{‡} Sales+streaming figures based on certification alone.
