= List of UK top-ten albums in 2004 =

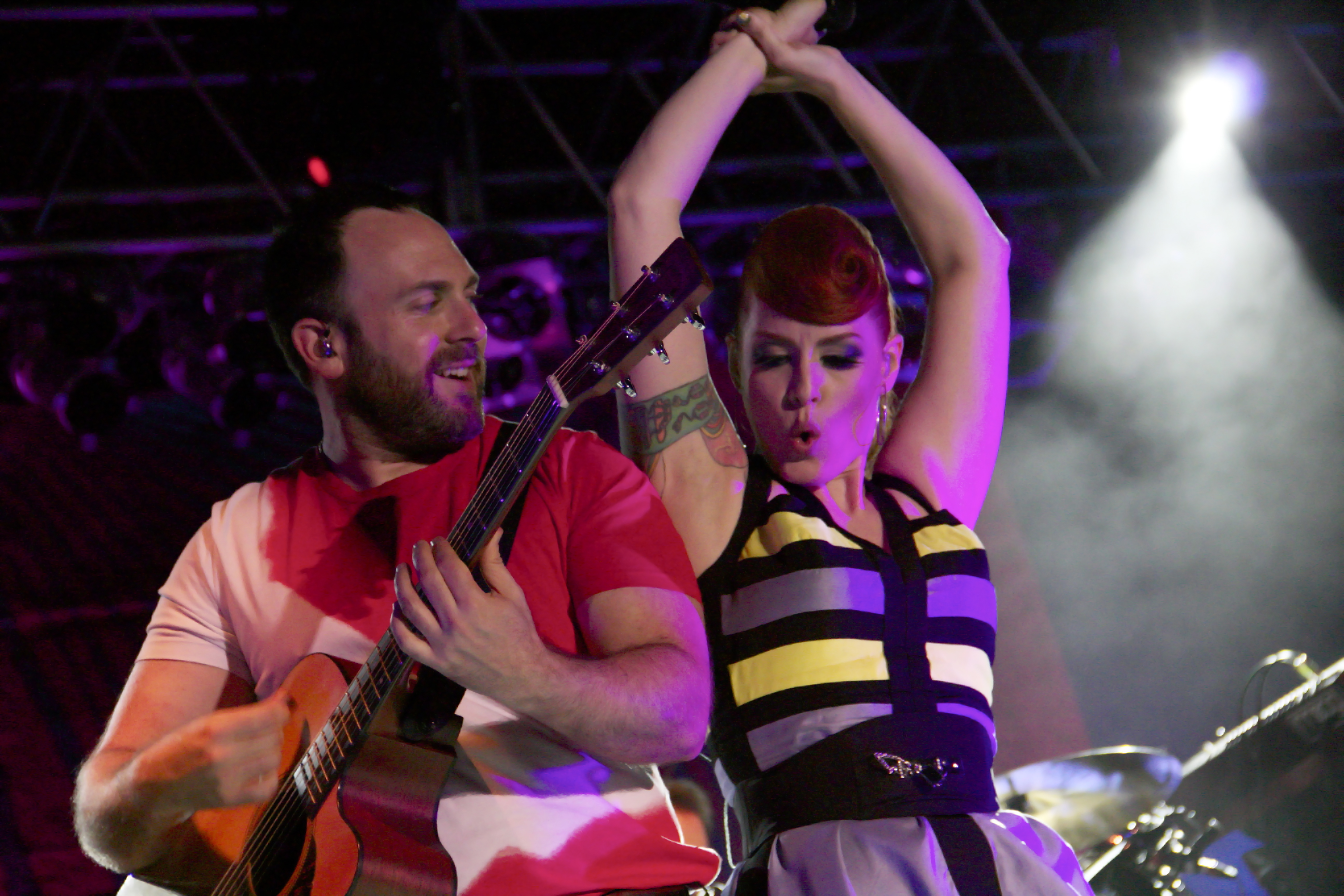
American rock band Scissor Sisters had the best selling album of 2004 in the UK with their self-titled debut album Scissor Sisters, which lasted 41 weeks in the top 10 and had four non-consecutive weeks at number-one.

The UK Albums Chart is one of many music charts compiled by the Official Charts Company that calculates the best-selling albums of the week in the United Kingdom. Since 2004 the chart has been based on the sales of both physical albums and digital downloads. This list shows albums that peaked in the Top 10 of the UK Albums Chart during 2004, as well as albums which peaked in 2003 and 2005 but were in the top 10 in 2004. The entry date is when the album appeared in the top 10 for the first time (week ending, as published by the Official Charts Company, which is six days after the chart is announced).

One-hundred and thirty-four albums were in the top ten this year. Thirteen albums from 2003 remained in the top 10 for several weeks at the beginning of the year, while Hot Fuss by The Killers and Love Songs: A Compilation… Old and New by Phil Collins were both released in 2004 but did not reach their peak until 2005. Elephunk by The Black Eyed Peas and Twentysomething by Jamie Cullum were the albums from 2003 to reach their peak in 2004. Eight artists scored multiple entries in the top 10 in 2004. Dizzee Rascal, Franz Ferdinand, The Killers, McFly and Scissor Sisters were among the many artists who achieved their first UK charting top 10 album in 2004.

The 2003 Christmas number-one album, Life for Rent by Dido, remained at the top spot for the first week of 2004. Friday's Child by Will Young returned for a second week as a chart topper after scaling the chart in December 2003, with Life for Rent subsequently replacing Friday's Child for another two weeks on top. The first new number-one album of the year was Call Off the Search by Katie Melua. Overall, twenty-nine different albums peaked at number-one in 2004, with twenty-nine unique artists hitting that position.

== Background ==
=== Multiple entries ===
One-hundred and thirty-four albums charted in the top 10 in 2004, with one-hundred and twenty-two albums reaching their peak this year (including Gold: Greatest Hits, Greatest, No Angel, Original Pirate Material, The Stone Roses and Tears Roll Down (Greatest Hits 82–92), which all charted in previous years but reached a peak on their latest chart run).

Eight artists scored multiple entries in the top 10 in 2004. Daniel O'Donnell, Dido, Joss Stone, Phil Collins, R.E.M., Red Hot Chili Peppers, The Streets and Westlife were the acts who had two top 10 albums this year. Daniel O'Donnell, Joss Stone and Phil Collin's two entries were both released this year, with Original Pirate Material by The Streets returning after missing the top 10 when it was first released in 2002.

=== Chart debuts ===
Thirty-three artists achieved their first top 10 album in 2004 as a lead artist. Joss Stone and The Streets both had one more entry in their breakthrough year.

The following table (collapsed on desktop site) does not include acts who had previously charted as part of a group and secured their first top 10 solo album, or featured appearances on compilations or other artists recordings.

Artist	Number of top 10s	First entry	Chart position	Other entries
Katie Melua	1	Call Off the Search	1	—
Joss Stone	2	The Soul Sessions	4	Mind Body & Soul (1)
Snow Patrol	1	Final Straw	3	—
Lostprophets	1	Start Something	4	—
Incubus	1	A Crow Left of the Murder...	6	—
Franz Ferdinand	1	Franz Ferdinand	3	—
Michelle	1	The Meaning of Love	3	—
Zero 7	1	When It Falls	3	—
Jamelia	1	Thank You	4	—
N.E.R.D	1	Fly or Die	4	—
Scissor Sisters	1	Scissor Sisters	1	—
Diana Krall	1	The Girl in the Other Room	4	—
Maroon 5	1	Songs About Jane	1	—
The Rasmus	1	Dead Letters	10	—
Eamon	1	I Don't Want You Back	6	—
Keane	1	Hopes and Fears	1	—
The Streets	2	A Grand Don't Come for Free	1	Original Pirate Material (10)
Mario Winans	1	Hurt No More	3	—
The Calling	1	Two	9	—
The Killers	1	Hot Fuss	1	—
Razorlight	1	Up All Night	3	—
McFly	1	Room on the 3rd Floor	1	—
Damien Rice	1	O	8	—
The Finn Brothers	1	Everyone Is Here	8	—
The Libertines	1	The Libertines	1	—
The Blue Nile	1	High	10	—
Natasha Bedingfield	1	Unwritten	1	—
Kasabian	1	Kasabian	4	—
Dizzee Rascal	1	Showtime	8	—
Goldie Lookin Chain	1	Greatest Hits	5	—
Good Charlotte	1	The Chronicles of Life and Death	8	—
Il Divo	1	Il Divo	1	—
Lemar	1	Time to Grow	8	—

Notes

Brian Wilson Presents Smile was the first album released by The Beach Boys founder Brian Wilson to make the top ten in his solo career. With his group, he had contributed to fourteen UK top 10 studio and compilation albums.

=== Best-selling albums ===
Scissor Sisters had the best-selling album of the year with Scissor Sisters. The album spent 41 weeks in the top 10 (including four weeks at number one), sold over 1.594 million copies and was certified 5× platinum by the BPI. Hopes and Fears by Keane came in second place. Robbie Williams' Greatest Hits, Songs About Jane from Maroon 5 and Call Off the Search by Katie Melua made up the top five. Albums by Anastacia, Usher, Norah Jones, Snow Patrol and Il Divo were also in the top ten best-selling albums of the year.

== Top-ten albums ==
Key

Symbol	Meaning
‡	Album peaked in 2003 but still in chart in 2004.
♦	Album released in 2004 but peaked in 2005.
(#)	Year-end top-ten album position and rank
Entered	The date that the album first appeared in the chart.
Peak	Highest position that the album reached in the UK Albums Chart.

Entered (week ending)	Weeks in top 10	Album	Artist	Peak	Peak reached (week ending)	Weeks at peak
Albums in 2003
1 February 2003	21	Stripped ‡ ^{[]}	Christina Aguilera	2	15 March 2003	1
24 May 2003	16	Fallen ‡ ^{[]}	Evanescence	1	28 June 2003	1
19 July 2003	22	Permission to Land ‡ ^{[]}	The Darkness	1	6 September 2003	4
27 September 2003	17	Elephunk ^{[]}	The Black Eyed Peas	3	17 January 2004	4
11 October 2003	21	Life for Rent ‡	Dido	1	11 October 2003	10
8 November 2003	12	In Time: The Best of R.E.M. 1988–2003 ‡	R.E.M.	1	8 November 2003	1
8 November 2003	5	Three ‡ ^{[]}	Sugababes	3	8 November 2003	1
8 November 2003	6	Twentysomething ^{[]}	Jamie Cullum	3	6 March 2004	1
22 November 2003	9	Greatest Hits ‡ ^{[]}	Red Hot Chili Peppers	4	29 November 2003	1
29 November 2003	10	Number Ones ‡	Michael Jackson	1	29 November 2003	1
29 November 2003	7	A Present for Everyone ‡	Busted	2	29 November 2003	1
6 December 2003	5	Turnaround ‡	Westlife	1	6 December 2003	1
13 December 2003	15	Friday's Child ‡ ^{[]}	Will Young	1	13 December 2003	2
Albums in 2004
10 January 2004	3	No Angel	Dido	8	17 January 2004	1
17 January 2004	15	Call Off the Search (#5)	Katie Melua	1	31 January 2004	6
24 January 2004	4	Tears Roll Down (Greatest Hits 82–92)	Tears for Fears	6	24 January 2004	3
24 January 2004	9	Speakerboxxx/The Love Below	Outkast	8	24 January 2004	4
31 January 2004	5	The Singles 1992–2003	No Doubt	5	6 March 2004	1
7 February 2004	2	Talkie Walkie	Air	2	7 February 2004	1
7 February 2004	13	The Soul Sessions	Joss Stone	4	7 February 2004	1
7 February 2004	1	Nightfreak and the Sons of Becker	The Coral	5	7 February 2004	1
14 February 2004	4	The Best of LeAnn Rimes	LeAnn Rimes	2	14 February 2004	1
14 February 2004	15	Final Straw (#9)	Snow Patrol	3	14 February 2004	2
14 February 2004	1	Start Something	Lostprophets	4	14 February 2004	1
14 February 2004	1	A Crow Left of the Murder...	Incubus	6	14 February 2004	1
21 February 2004	11	Feels Like Home (#8)	Norah Jones	1	21 February 2004	2
21 February 2004	13	Franz Ferdinand	Franz Ferdinand	3	21 February 2004	1
21 February 2004	1	Free Me	Emma	7	21 February 2004	1
28 February 2004	1	The Meaning of Love	Michelle	3	28 February 2004	1
28 February 2004	3	Greatest	Duran Duran	4	28 February 2004	2
13 March 2004	2	When It Falls	Zero 7	3	13 March 2004	1
13 March 2004	2	Thank You	Jamelia	4	13 March 2004	1
20 March 2004	3	The Jukebox Years: 20 More Blue Jeans Classics	Daniel O'Donnell	3	20 March 2004	1
20 March 2004	2	Just for You	Lionel Richie	5	20 March 2004	1
20 March 2004	1	Only You	Harry Connick Jr.	6	20 March 2004	1
20 March 2004	4	His Greatest Love Songs	Engelbert Humperdinck	4	27 March 2004	1
27 March 2004	4	Patience	George Michael	1	27 March 2004	1
27 March 2004	10	Greatest Hits	Guns N' Roses	1	24 April 2004	3
27 March 2004	2	Ultimate Manilow	Barry Manilow	8	27 March 2004	1
3 April 2004	22	Confessions (#7)	Usher	1	3 April 2004	1
3 April 2004	2	Fly or Die	N.E.R.D	4	3 April 2004	1
3 April 2004	1	Me and Mr. Johnson	Eric Clapton	10	3 April 2004	1
10 April 2004	16	Anastacia (#6)	Anastacia	1	10 April 2004	3
10 April 2004	41	Scissor Sisters (#1)	Scissor Sisters	1	10 July 2004	4
17 April 2004	2	ABBA Gold: Greatest Hits	ABBA	4	17 April 2004	1
17 April 2004	1	The Greatest Hits	Atomic Kitten	5	17 April 2004	1
24 April 2004	1	The Girl in the Other Room	Diana Krall	4	24 April 2004	1
24 April 2004	29	Songs About Jane (#4)	Maroon 5	1	28 August 2004	1
24 April 2004	2	Dead Letters	The Rasmus	10	24 April 2004	2
1 May 2004	1	Musicology	Prince	3	1 May 2004	1
1 May 2004	2	I Don't Want You Back	Eamon	6	1 May 2004	1
8 May 2004	2	D12 World	D12	1	8 May 2004	1
8 May 2004	3	Life Story	The Shadows	7	15 May 2004	1
15 May 2004	1	Then and Now	The Who	5	15 May 2004	1
22 May 2004	27	Hopes and Fears (#2)	Keane	1	22 May 2004	5
22 May 2004	17	A Grand Don't Come for Free	The Streets	1	3 July 2004	2
22 May 2004	6	Hurt No More	Mario Winans	3	5 June 2004	2
29 May 2004	2	You Are the Quarry	Morrissey	2	29 May 2004	1
29 May 2004	1	Meltdown	Ash	5	29 May 2004	1
29 May 2004	1	So-Called Chaos	Alanis Morissette	8	29 May 2004	1
29 May 2004	1	Play to Win	Gabrielle	10	29 May 2004	1
5 June 2004	9	Under My Skin	Avril Lavigne	1	5 June 2004	1
5 June 2004	1	Vol 3: (The Subliminal Verses)	Slipknot	5	5 June 2004	1
12 June 2004	2	Borrowed Heaven	The Corrs	2	12 June 2004	1
12 June 2004	1	Two	The Calling	9	12 June 2004	1
19 June 2004	3	No Roots	Faithless	1	19 June 2004	1
19 June 2004	1	Supergrass Is 10	Supergrass	4	19 June 2004	1
19 June 2004	14	Hot Fuss ♦	The Killers	1	22 January 2005	2
26 June 2004	2	To the 5 Boroughs	Beastie Boys	2	26 June 2004	1
26 June 2004	1	Greatest Hits	Thin Lizzy	3	26 June 2004	1
26 June 2004	1	The Platinum Collection	Phil Collins	4	26 June 2004	1
3 July 2004	1	The Journey: The Very Best of Donna Summer	Donna Summer	6	3 July 2004	1
3 July 2004	1	One Plus One Is One	Badly Drawn Boy	9	3 July 2004	1
10 July 2004	9	Up All Night	Razorlight	3	10 July 2004	1
10 July 2004	2	The Very Best of The Jacksons	The Jacksons	7	10 July 2004	1
10 July 2004	1	The Cure	The Cure	8	10 July 2004	1
10 July 2004	1	The Stone Roses	The Stone Roses	9	10 July 2004	1
10 July 2004	1	Original Pirate Material	The Streets	10	10 July 2004	1
17 July 2004	5	Room on the 3rd Floor	McFly	1	17 July 2004	1
24 July 2004	6	O	Damien Rice	8	24 July 2004	4
31 July 2004	1	Tyrannosaurus Hives	The Hives	7	31 July 2004	1
7 August 2004	4	Live in Hyde Park	Red Hot Chili Peppers	1	7 August 2004	2
4 September 2004	2	Always Outnumbered, Never Outgunned	The Prodigy	1	4 September 2004	1
4 September 2004	1	Everyone Is Here	The Finn Brothers	8	4 September 2004	1
11 September 2004	2	The Libertines	The Libertines	1	11 September 2004	1
11 September 2004	1	Medúlla	Björk	9	11 September 2004	1
11 September 2004	1	High	The Blue Nile	10	11 September 2004	1
18 September 2004	4	Unwritten	Natasha Bedingfield	1	18 September 2004	1
18 September 2004	4	Kasabian	Kasabian	4	18 September 2004	3
18 September 2004	1	Voice	Alison Moyet	7	18 September 2004	1
18 September 2004	1	Showtime	Dizzee Rascal	8	18 September 2004	1
25 September 2004	3	Out of Nothing	Embrace	1	25 September 2004	1
25 September 2004	2	Studio 150	Paul Weller	2	25 September 2004	1
25 September 2004	1	Greatest Hits	Goldie Lookin Chain	5	25 September 2004	1
25 September 2004	2	Solarized	Ian Brown	7	25 September 2004	1
25 September 2004	1	Suit	Nelly	8	25 September 2004	1
25 September 2004	1	Let's Bottle Bohemia	The Thrills	9	25 September 2004	1
2 October 2004	18	American Idiot	Green Day	1	2 October 2004	2
2 October 2004	1	Room Service	Bryan Adams	4	2 October 2004	1
2 October 2004	1	Welcome to the North	The Music	8	2 October 2004	1
9 October 2004	5	Mind Body & Soul	Joss Stone	1	9 October 2004	1
9 October 2004	2	Lest We Forget: The Best Of	Marilyn Manson	4	9 October 2004	1
9 October 2004	2	Tom Jones & Jools Holland	Tom Jones & Jools Holland	5	9 October 2004	2
9 October 2004	2	The Best of Groove Armada	Groove Armada	6	9 October 2004	2
9 October 2004	1	Brian Wilson Presents Smile	Brian Wilson	7	9 October 2004	1
16 October 2004	3	Around the Sun	R.E.M.	1	16 October 2004	1
23 October 2004	11	10 Years of Hits	Ronan Keating	1	23 October 2004	1
23 October 2004	1	Astronaut	Duran Duran	3	23 October 2004	1
23 October 2004	2	Miracle	Celine Dion	5	23 October 2004	1
23 October 2004	1	The Chronicles of Life and Death	Good Charlotte	8	23 October 2004	1
23 October 2004	2	Welcome to My World: 23 Classics from the Jim Reeves Songbook	Daniel O'Donnell	6	30 October 2004	1
30 October 2004	14	Greatest Hits (#3)	Robbie Williams	1	30 October 2004	4
30 October 2004	3	Stardust: The Great American Songbook, Volume III	Rod Stewart	3	30 October 2004	2
6 November 2004	1	Best of Def Leppard	Def Leppard	6	6 November 2004	1
6 November 2004	1	Something's Goin' On	Cliff Richard	7	6 November 2004	1
6 November 2004	1	Once More with Feeling: Singles 1996–2004	Placebo	8	6 November 2004	1
6 November 2004	1	Amore Musica	Russell Watson	10	6 November 2004	1
13 November 2004	11	Il Divo (#10)	Il Divo	1	13 November 2004	1
13 November 2004	1	Aha Shake Heartbreak	Kings of Leon	3	13 November 2004	1
13 November 2004	2	Singles	Travis	4	13 November 2004	1
13 November 2004	1	All the Best	Tina Turner	6	13 November 2004	1
13 November 2004	1	Number Ones	Bee Gees	7	13 November 2004	1
13 November 2004	3	Love Songs: A Compilation… Old and New ♦	Phil Collins	9	19 February 2005	1
20 November 2004	11	Encore	Eminem	1	20 November 2004	2
20 November 2004	3	Greatest Hits: My Prerogative	Britney Spears	2	20 November 2004	1
20 November 2004	4	...Allow Us to Be Frank	Westlife	3	20 November 2004	1
20 November 2004	5	Greatest Hits	Shania Twain	6	20 November 2004	2
20 November 2004	1	Second First Impression	Daniel Bedingfield	8	20 November 2004	1
27 November 2004	2	Destiny Fulfilled	Destiny's Child	5	27 November 2004	1
27 November 2004	1	Best of Blue	Blue	6	27 November 2004	1
4 December 2004	7	How to Dismantle an Atomic Bomb	U2	1	4 December 2004	3
4 December 2004	7	Ultimate Kylie	Kylie Minogue	4	4 December 2004	3
11 December 2004	2	What Will the Neighbours Say?	Girls Aloud	6	11 December 2004	1
11 December 2004	1	Time to Grow	Lemar	8	11 December 2004	1

== Entries by artist ==
The following table shows artists who achieved two or more top 10 entries in 2004, including albums that reached their peak in 2003 or 2005. The figures only include main artists, with featured artists and appearances on compilation albums not counted individually for each artist. The total number of weeks an artist spent in the top ten in 2003 is also shown.

Entries	Artist	Weeks	Albums
2	Daniel O'Donnell	5	The Jukebox Years, Welcome to My World
2	Dido ^{[]}	12	Life for Rent, No Angel
2	Joss Stone	17	Mind Body & Soul, The Soul Sessions
2	Phil Collins ^{[]}	2	Love Songs: A Compilation… Old and New, The Platinum Collection
2	R.E.M. ^{[]}	7	Around the Sun, In Time: The Best of R.E.M. 1988–2003
2	Red Hot Chili Peppers ^{[]}	8	Greatest Hits, Live in Hyde Park
2	The Streets	18	A Grand Don't Come for Free, Original Pirate Material
2	Westlife ^{[]}	4	...Allow Us to Be Frank, Turnaround

== Notes ==
- Hot Fuss reached its peak of number-one on 22 January 2005 (week ending).
- Stripped re-entered the top 10 at number 9 on 10 January 2004 (week ending).
- Fallen re-entered the top 10 at number 7 on 10 January 2004 (week ending) for 5 weeks.
- Permission to Land re-entered the top 10 at number 5 on 28 February 2004 (week ending) for 2 weeks.
- Elephunk re-entered the top 10 at number 9 on 17 July 2004 (week ending).
- Three re-entered the top 10 at number 10 on 17 January 2004 (week ending).
- Twentysomething re-entered the top 10 at number 3 on 6 March 2004 (week ending) for 4 weeks.
- Greatest Hits (Red Hot Chili Peppers album) re-entered the top 10 at number 10 on 31 January 2004 (week ending).
- Friday's Child re-entered the top 10 at number 10 on 13 March 2004 (week ending) for 6 weeks and at number 7 on 24 July 2004 (week ending).
- No Angel originally peaked at number-one upon its initial release in 2001.
- Tears Roll Down (Greatest Hits 82–92) originally peaked at number 2 upon its initial release in 1992. It re-entered the top 10 at number 9 on 21 February 2004 (week ending).
- Speakerboxxx/The Love Below re-entered the top 10 at number 8 on 6 March 2004 (week ending) for 2 weeks, at number 10 on 17 July 2004 (week ending) for 3 weeks and at number 8 on 8 January 2005 (week ending).
- The Singles 1992–2003 re-entered the top 10 at number 5 on 6 March 2004 (week ending) for 2 weeks.
- The Soul Sessions re-entered the top 10 at number 7 on 22 May 2004 (week ending) for 10 weeks.
- Final Straw re-entered the top 10 at number 7 on 1 May 2004 (week ending) for 3 weeks and at number 6 on 24 July 2004 (week ending) for 8 weeks.
- Franz Ferdinand re-entered the top 10 at number 10 on 8 May 2004 (week ending) for 3 weeks, at number 10 on 18 September 2004 (week ending), at number 10 on 8 January 2005 (week ending) for 4 weeks and at number 4 on 19 February 2005 (week ending) for 3 weeks.
- Greatest originally peaked at number outside the top ten at number 15 upon its initial release in 1998.
- Greatest Hits (Guns N' Roses album) re-entered the top 10 at number 10 on 26 June 2004 (week ending).
- Ultimate Manilow re-entered the top 10 at number 9 on 16 October 2004 (week ending).
- Confessions re-entered the top 10 at number 8 on 5 June 2004 (week ending) for 14 weeks and at number 10 on 16 October 2004 (week ending).
- Anastacia re-entered the top 10 at number 7 on 7 August 2004 (week ending) for 7 weeks.
- Scissor Sisters re-entered the top 10 at number 5 on 26 June 2004 (week ending) for 12 weeks, at number 10 on 23 October 2004 (week ending) for 5 weeks and at number 7 on 25 December 2004 (week ending) for 14 weeks.
- Gold: Greatest Hits originally peaked at number-one upon its initial release in 1992. It returned to its peak again after being re-released in 1999.
- Songs About Jane re-entered the top 10 at number 10 on 12 June 2004 (week ending), at number 7 on 10 August 2004 (week ending) for 14 weeks and at number 9 on 11 December 2004 (week ending) for 9 weeks.
- Hopes and Fears re-entered the top 10 at number 9 on 27 November 2004 (week ending) for 2 weeks, at number 10 on 18 December 2004 (week ending) for 3 weeks, at number 6 on 15 January 2005 (week ending) for 10 weeks, at number 5 on 16 July 2005 (week ending) and at number 9 on 30 July 2005 (week ending) for 2 weeks.
- Hurt No More re-entered the top 10 at number 8 on 3 July 2004 (week ending).
- Under My Skin re-entered the top 10 at number 9 on 31 July 2004 (week ending) for 6 weeks.
- Up All Night re-entered the top 10 at number 5 on 18 September 2004 (week ending) for 3 weeks, at number 5 on 30 April 2005 (week ending) for 2 weeks and at number 9 on 16 July 2005 (week ending) for 2 weeks.
- The Stone Roses originally peaked outside the top 10 at number 82 upon its initial release in 1994. The album's previous highest placing was two weeks at number 23 when it was re-released in 1998.
- Original Pirate Material originally peaked outside the top 10 at number 12 upon its initial release in 2002.
- Room on the 3rd Floor re-entered the top 10 at number 10 on 28 August 2004 (week ending).
- O re-entered the top 10 at number 10 on 14 August 2004 (week ending) for 2 weeks and at number 8 on 29 January 2005 (week ending) for 2 weeks.
- Greatest Hits (Robbie Williams album) re-entered the top 10 at number 5 on 7 January 2006 (week ending) for 2 weeks.
- Il Divo re-entered the top 10 at number 6 on 5 March 2005 (week ending) for 2 weeks.
- Love Songs: A Compilation... Old and New re-entered the top 10 at number 9 on 19 February 2005 (week ending) and at number 10 on 12 March 2005 (week ending).
- ...Allow Us to Be Frank re-entered the top 10 at number 9 on 25 December 2004 (week ending) for 2 weeks.
- How to Dismantle an Atomic Bomb re-entered the top 10 at number 10 on 22 January 2005 (week ending) and at number 10 on 26 February 2005 (week ending).
- Mind Body & Soul re-entered the top 10 at number 9 on 26 February 2005 (week ending).
- American Idiot re-entered the top 10 at number-one on 8 January 2005 (week ending) for 9 weeks, at number 9 on 2 April 2005 (week ending), and at number 7 on 30 July 2005 (week ending) for 2 weeks.
- Kasabian re-entered the top 10 at number 4 on 22 January 2005 (week ending) for 3 weeks.
- Hot Fuss re-entered the top 10 at number 5 on 8 January 2005 (week ending) for 9 weeks, at number 10 on 19 March 2005 (week ending), at number 10 on 2 April 2005 (week ending) for 2 weeks and at number 10 on 23 July 2005 (week ending).
- Figure includes album that peaked in 2003.
- Figure includes album that first charted in 2003 but peaked in 2004.
- Figure includes album that peaked in 2005.

== See also ==
- 2004 in British music
- List of number-one albums from the 2000s (UK)
