= Maggot (rapper) =

Welsh rapper (born 1976)

- Born: Andrew Major; 1 May 1976 (age 50)
- Origin: Wales, United Kingdom
- Genre: Hip Hop
- Occupation: financial advisor
- Formerly of: Goldie Lookin Chain

Andrew Major (born 1976), known professionally as Maggot, is a British rapper from Wales.

== Career ==
Several Goldie Lookin Chain songs have been written about him. These include "The Maggot" (Greatest Hits); based on the tune of "You've Got to Pick a Pocket or Two" from the musical Oliver! and "Maneater" by Hall & Oates together with a Steeleye Span hook. "The Maggot" also namechecks Fagin, Dick Turpin, Penelope Keith and Kylie Minogue and features fellow GLC member Mystikal.

Another song, "Maggot at Midnight" (from Safe as Fuck), namechecks Dr. Jekyll and Mr. Hyde, Nosferatu, The Crystal Maze, Michael Jackson and Jackson's song "Thriller", and features a sample from the television show 'Danger Mouse'. Another short track he features on is called "Maggot's Stand-Up" where Maggot does a short stand-up comic style set; it mostly features scatological references. Maggot also identifies himself as The Hip Hop Vampire, which is one of his aliases. He's also the subject of the GLC song "Six Feet Tall" which features the Commodores' song "Easy" as the background track and is a tribute to Maggot, basically reminiscing on his time with the GLC and how they miss him in the band.

He appeared in the fourth series of Celebrity Big Brother in 2006, finishing third, trailing Michael Barrymore and eventual winner Chantelle Houghton.

== After Goldie Lookin Chain ==
Maggot left Goldie Lookin Chain to pursue other interests.

In 2018 he became a financial consultant for Newport firm UCF.
