= Soap bar =

Soap bar or Soapbar may refer to:

- A bar of soap, surfactant used in conjunction with water for washing and cleaning
- A slang name for a form of low quality and adulterated hashish
- "Soap Bar", a song by Goldie Lookin Chain from their album Greatest Hits
- "Bar Soap", a song by K.Flay from her album Mono
- P-90 single coil electric guitar pickup
