= List of UK top-ten albums in 2005 =

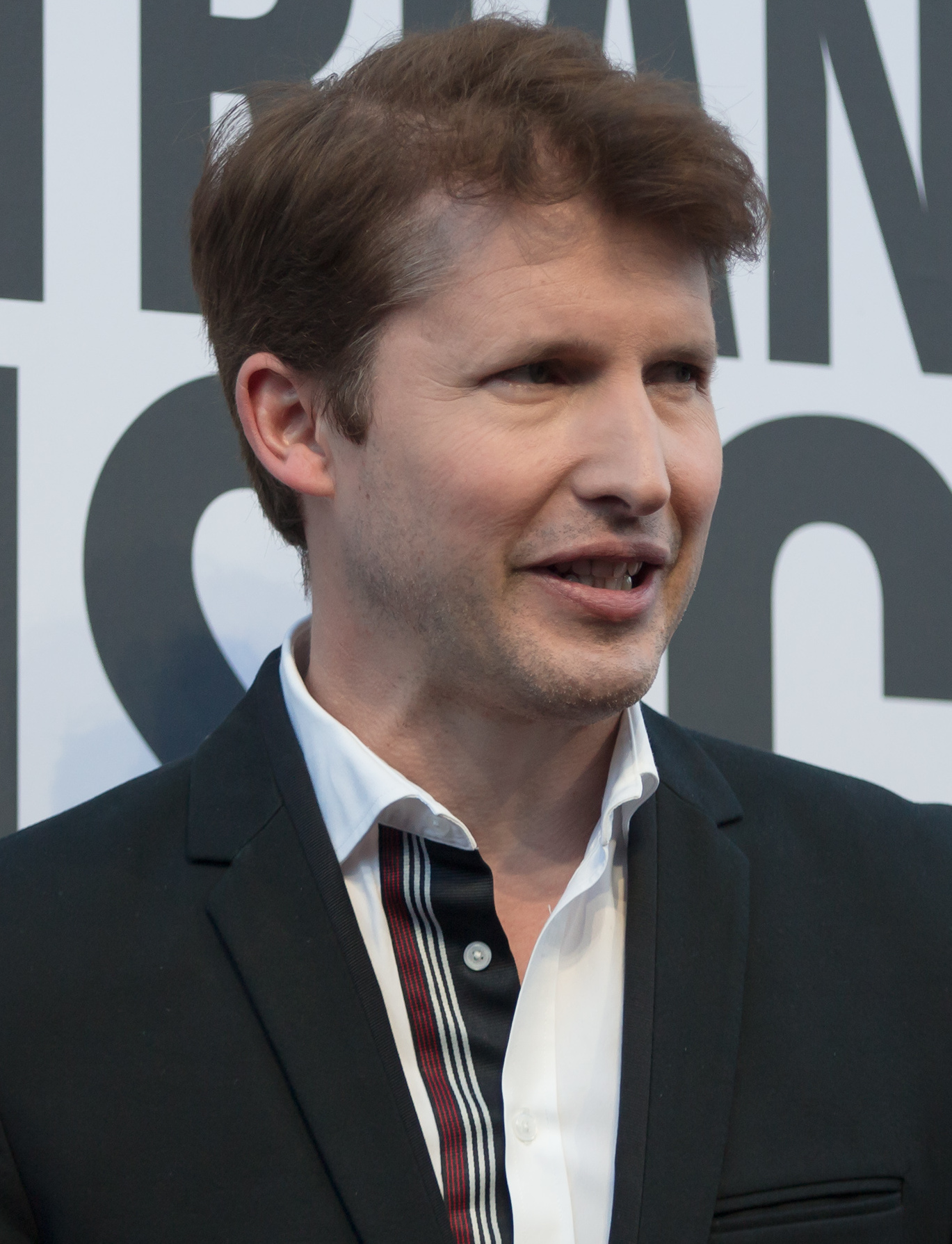
James Blunt's debut album Back to Bedlam was the UK's best selling album of 2005, spending 40 weeks in the top 10, including 10 weeks at number-one. It remains the biggest selling album of all time by a British male solo artist.

The UK Albums Chart is one of many music charts compiled by the Official Charts Company that calculates the best-selling albums of the week in the United Kingdom. Since 2004 the chart has been based on the sales of both physical albums and digital downloads. This list shows albums that peaked in the Top 10 of the UK Albums Chart during 2005, as well as albums which peaked in 2004 and 2006 but were in the top 10 in 2005. The entry date is when the album appeared in the top 10 for the first time (week ending, as published by the Official Charts Company, which is six days after the chart is announced).

One-hundred and twenty-nine albums were in the top ten this year. Nineteen albums from 2004 remained in the top 10 for several weeks at the beginning of the year, while Breakaway by Kelly Clarkson, Employment by Kaiser Chiefs, In Between Dreams by Jack Johnson, PCD by The Pussycat Dolls and Stars of CCTV by Hard-Fi were all released in 2005 but did not reach their peak until 2006. Hot Fuss by The Killers and Love Songs: A Compilation… Old and New by Phil Collins were the albums from 2004 to reach their peak in 2005. Eight artists scored multiple entries in the top 10 in 2005. Akon, James Blunt, Kaiser Chiefs, Kelly Clarkson and The Pussycat Dolls were among the many artists who achieved their first UK charting top 10 album in 2005.

The 2004 Christmas number-one album, Greatest Hits by Robbie Williams, remained at the top spot for the first week of 2005. American Idiot by Green Day returned for a second week as a chart topper after scaling the chart in October 2004, followed by the self titled album by Scissor Sisters which spent its third of four separate weeks as a chart topper. The first new number-one album of the year was Hot Fuss by The Killers. Overall, thirty-three different albums peaked at number-one in 2005, with Robbie Williams (2) having the most albums hit that position.

== Background ==
=== Multiple entries ===
One-hundred and twenty-nine albums charted in the top 10 in 2005, with one-hundred and two albums reaching their peak this year (including Greatest Hits (Mariah Carey) and Jeff Wayne's Musical Version of The War of the Worlds, which both charted in previous years but reached a peak on their latest chart run).

Eight artists scored multiple entries in the top 10 in 2005. Eminem, Franz Ferdinand, G4, Green Day, Il Divo, Mariah Carey, Robbie Williams and Westlife were the acts who had two top 10 albums this year. G4's two entries were both released this year, with Greatest Hits by Mariah Carey returning after missing the top 10 when it was first released in 2001.

=== Chart debuts ===
Thirty-one artists achieved their first top 10 album in 2005 as a lead artist.

The following table (collapsed on desktop site) does not include acts who had previously charted as part of a group and secured their first top 10 solo album, or featured appearances on compilations or other artists recordings.

Artist	Number of top 10s	First entry	Chart position	Other entries
The Zutons	1	Who Killed...... The Zutons?	6	—
Rooster	1	Rooster	3	—
The Game	1	The Documentary	7	—
Athlete	1	Tourist	1	—
Bloc Party	1	Silent Alarm	3	—
Tony Christie	1	Definitive Collection	1	—
G4	1	G4	1	—
Kaiser Chiefs	1	Employment	2	—
Mario	1	Turning Point	8	—
The Bravery	1	The Bravery	5	—
Jem	1	Finally Woken	6	—
Akon	1	Trouble	1	—
Patrizio Buanne	1	The Italian	10	—
Strange Sensation	1	Mighty ReArranger	4	—
Steve Brookstein	1	Heart & Soul	1	—
KT Tunstall	1	Eye to the Telescope	3	—
System of a Down	1	Mezmerize	2	—
James Blunt	1	Back to Bedlam	1	—
Audioslave	1	Out of Exile	5	—
The Magic Numbers	1	The Magic Numbers	7	—
Hard-Fi	1	Stars of CCTV	1	—
Kelly Clarkson	1	Breakaway	3	—
Crazy Frog	1	Crazy Hits	5	—
Daniel Powter	1	Daniel Powter	5	—
Madeleine Peyroux	1	Careless Love	7	—
Goldfrapp	1	Supernature	2	—
Kanye West	1	Late Registration	2	—
Jack Johnson	1	In Between Dreams	1	—
The Pussycat Dolls	1	PCD	7	—
Paul Anka	1	Rock Swings	9	—
Babyshambles	1	Down in Albion	10	—

Notes

Gwen Stefani kickstarted her solo career in 2005 with her debut album Love. Angel. Music. Baby. reaching number 4. Her previous album chart success was as part of her group No Doubt. Strange Sensation was a group created by former Led Zeppelin frontman Robert Plant after years of success on his own. Their first album Dreamland had missed the top ten in 2002, stalling at number 20.

Lee Ryan had three successive number-one albums in the line-up of Blue, beginning with All Rise in 2001, followed by One Love and Guilty in successive years. His self titled album was his first and only solo entry on the album chart. Babyshambles was a new project for former Libertines singer Pete Doherty, with their debut album Down in Albion reaching number ten.

=== Best-selling albums ===
James Blunt had the best-selling album of the year with Back to Bedlam. The album spent 40 weeks in the top 10 (including ten weeks at number one), sold almost 2.368 million copies and was certified 8× platinum by the BPI. X & Y by Coldplay came in second place. Robbie Williams' Intensive Care, Employment from Kaiser Chiefs and Demon Days by Gorillaz made up the top five. Albums by Westlife, KT Tunstall, Kelly Clarkson, Eminem and Faithless were also in the top ten best-selling albums of the year.

== Top-ten albums ==
Key

Symbol	Meaning
‡	Album peaked in 2004 but still in chart in 2005.
♦	Album released in 2005 but peaked in 2006.
(#)	Year-end top-ten album position and rank
Entered	The date that the album first appeared in the chart.
Peak	Highest position that the album reached in the UK Albums Chart.

Entered (week ending)	Weeks in top 10	Album	Artist	Peak	Peak reached (week ending)	Weeks at peak
Albums in 2004
24 January 2004	9	Speakerboxxx/The Love Below ‡	Outkast	8	24 January 2004	4
21 February 2004	13	Franz Ferdinand ‡	Franz Ferdinand	3	21 February 2004	1
10 April 2004	41	Scissor Sisters ‡	Scissor Sisters	1	10 July 2004	4
24 April 2004	29	Songs About Jane ‡	Maroon 5	1	28 August 2004	1
22 May 2004	27	Hopes and Fears ‡	Keane	1	22 May 2004	5
19 June 2004	14	Hot Fuss	The Killers	1	22 January 2005	2
10 July 2004	5	Up All Night ‡	Razorlight	3	10 July 2004	1
24 July 2004	6	O ‡	Damien Rice	8	24 July 2004	4
18 September 2004	4	Kasabian ‡	Kasabian	4	18 September 2004	3
2 October 2004	18	American Idiot ‡	Green Day	1	2 October 2004	2
9 October 2004	5	Mind Body & Soul ‡	Joss Stone	1	9 October 2004	1
23 October 2004	11	10 Years of Hits ‡	Ronan Keating	1	23 October 2004	1
30 October 2004	14	Greatest Hits ‡	Robbie Williams	1	30 October 2004	4
13 November 2004	11	Il Divo ‡	Il Divo	1	13 November 2004	1
13 November 2004	3	Love Songs: A Compilation... Old and New	Phil Collins	9	19 February 2005	1
20 November 2004	11	Encore ‡	Eminem	1	20 November 2004	2
20 November 2004	4	...Allow Us to Be Frank ‡	Westlife	3	20 November 2004	1
4 December 2004	7	How to Dismantle an Atomic Bomb ‡	U2	1	4 December 2004	3
4 December 2004	7	Ultimate Kylie ‡	Kylie Minogue	4	4 December 2004	3
Albums in 2005
8 January 2005	3	Who Killed...... The Zutons?	The Zutons	6	8 January 2005	1
29 January 2005	12	Love. Angel. Music. Baby.	Gwen Stefani	4	29 January 2005	1
5 February 2005	3	Push the Button	The Chemical Brothers	1	5 February 2005	1
5 February 2005	2	Rooster	Rooster	3	5 February 2005	1
5 February 2005	1	The Documentary	The Game	7	5 February 2005	1
12 February 2005	7	Tourist	Athlete	1	12 February 2005	1
12 February 2005	1	Pushing the Senses	Feeder	2	12 February 2005	1
12 February 2005	1	It's Time	Michael Bublé	4	12 February 2005	1
12 February 2005	3	Love, Elvis	Elvis Presley	8	19 February 2005	2
26 February 2005	2	Silent Alarm	Bloc Party	3	26 February 2005	1
5 March 2005	1	Some Cities	Doves	1	5 March 2005	1
5 March 2005	11	Definitive Collection	Tony Christie	1	2 April 2005	2
12 March 2005	8	G4	G4	1	12 March 2005	1
12 March 2005	1	Gold: Greatest Hits	The Carpenters	4	12 March 2005	1
12 March 2005	1	The Ultimate	Matt Monro	7	12 March 2005	1
12 March 2005	1	Rebirth	Jennifer Lopez	8	12 March 2005	1
19 March 2005	9	The Massacre	50 Cent	1	19 March 2005	1
19 March 2005	35	Employment ♦ (#4)	Kaiser Chiefs	2	25 February 2006	1
19 March 2005	1	Turning Point	Mario	8	19 March 2005	1
19 March 2005	1	Warnings/Promises	Idlewild	9	19 March 2005	1
26 March 2005	6	Language. Sex. Violence. Other?	Stereophonics	1	26 March 2005	1
26 March 2005	1	The Bravery	The Bravery	5	26 March 2005	1
26 March 2005	1	Hotel	Moby	8	26 March 2005	1
26 March 2005	1	Human After All	Daft Punk	10	26 March 2005	1
2 April 2005	11	The Singles	Basement Jaxx	1	23 April 2005	1
2 April 2005	2	Lullabies to Paralyze	Queens of the Stone Age	4	2 April 2005	1
9 April 2005	1	Waiting for the Sirens' Call	New Order	5	9 April 2005	1
9 April 2005	3	Finally Woken	Jem	6	2 July 2005	1
16 April 2005	3	Counting Down the Days	Natalie Imbruglia	1	16 April 2005	1
16 April 2005	9	Trouble	Akon	1	30 April 2005	2
16 April 2005	6	The Emancipation of Mimi	Mariah Carey	7	16 April 2005	2
23 April 2005	1	Bleed Like Me	Garbage	4	23 April 2005	1
23 April 2005	3	The Collection	Shakin' Stevens	4	30 April 2005	1
7 May 2005	3	Devils & Dust	Bruce Springsteen	1	7 May 2005	1
7 May 2005	1	The Italian	Patrizio Buanne	10	7 May 2005	1
14 May 2005	1	With Teeth	Nine Inch Nails	3	14 May 2005	1
14 May 2005	1	Mighty ReArranger	Robert Plant & Strange Sensation	4	14 May 2005	1
14 May 2005	2	I Feel Free - Ultimate Cream	Cream	6	14 May 2005	2
21 May 2005	2	Heart & Soul	Steve Brookstein	1	21 May 2005	1
21 May 2005	19	Eye to the Telescope (#7)	KT Tunstall	3	24 September 2005	2
28 May 2005	16	Forever Faithless - The Greatest Hits (#10)	Faithless	1	28 May 2005	1
28 May 2005	2	Mezmerize	System of a Down	2	28 May 2005	1
28 May 2005	1	Magic Time	Van Morrison	3	28 May 2005	1
4 June 2005	22	Demon Days (#5)	Gorillaz	1	4 June 2005	1
4 June 2005	1	The Invisible Invasion	The Coral	3	4 June 2005	1
4 June 2005	40	Back to Bedlam (#1)	James Blunt	1	16 July 2005	10
4 June 2005	1	Out of Exile	Audioslave	5	4 June 2005	1
11 June 2005	6	Don't Believe the Truth	Oasis	1	11 June 2005	1
11 June 2005	3	Monkey Business	The Black Eyed Peas	4	11 June 2005	1
11 June 2005	1	Jackinabox	Turin Brakes	9	11 June 2005	1
18 June 2005	18	X & Y (#2)	Coldplay	1	18 June 2005	4
18 June 2005	2	Get Behind Me Satan	The White Stripes	3	18 June 2005	1
25 June 2005	5	In Your Honour	Foo Fighters	2	25 June 2005	1
25 June 2005	1	All Over the World: The Very Best of Electric Light Orchestra	Electric Light Orchestra	6	25 June 2005	1
25 June 2005	5	The Magic Numbers	The Magic Numbers	7	25 June 2005	1
25 June 2005	9	Jeff Wayne's Musical Version of The War of the Worlds	Jeff Wayne	5	13 August 2005	1
2 July 2005	2	Dynamite	Jamiroquai	3	2 July 2005	1
16 July 2005	7	Stars of CCTV ♦	Hard-Fi	1	28 January 2006	1
23 July 2005	1	Tissues and Issues	Charlotte Church	5	23 July 2005	1
30 July 2005	4	The Essential Michael Jackson	Michael Jackson	2	30 July 2005	1
30 July 2005	23	Breakaway ♦ (#8)	Kelly Clarkson	3	7 January 2006	1
6 August 2005	2	Crazy Hits	Crazy Frog	5	6 August 2005	1
13 August 2005	1	Lee Ryan	Lee Ryan	6	13 August 2005	1
20 August 2005	3	Daniel Powter	Daniel Powter	5	20 August 2005	2
27 August 2005	2	Careless Love	Madeleine Peyroux	7	27 August 2005	1
27 August 2005	1	Road to Rouen	Supergrass	9	27 August 2005	1
3 September 2005	2	Supernature	Goldfrapp	2	3 September 2005	1
3 September 2005	1	The Story Goes...	Craig David	5	3 September 2005	1
10 September 2005	2	Wonderland	McFly	1	10 September 2005	1
10 September 2005	6	Late Registration	Kanye West	2	10 September 2005	1
17 September 2005	1	A Bigger Bang	The Rolling Stones	2	17 September 2005	1
17 September 2005	17	In Between Dreams ♦	Jack Johnson	1	4 March 2006	1
24 September 2005	6	Life in Slow Motion	David Gray	1	24 September 2005	2
24 September 2005	5	PCD ♦	The Pussycat Dolls	7	8 July 2006	1
24 September 2005	1	Chaos and Creation in the Backyard	Paul McCartney	10	24 September 2005	1
1 October 2005	2	Have a Nice Day	Bon Jovi	2	1 October 2005	1
1 October 2005	3	Guilty Too	Barbra Streisand	3	1 October 2005	1
1 October 2005	1	The Greatest	Ian Brown	5	1 October 2005	1
1 October 2005	1	Teenage Dreams: 20 Great Rock 'N' Roll Memories	Daniel O'Donnell	10	1 October 2005	1
8 October 2005	10	Piece by Piece	Katie Melua	1	8 October 2005	1
8 October 2005	2	Catching Tales	Jamie Cullum	4	8 October 2005	1
8 October 2005	1	Odyssey	Hayley Westenra	10	8 October 2005	1
15 October 2005	3	You Could Have It So Much Better	Franz Ferdinand	1	15 October 2005	1
15 October 2005	1	Rock Swings	Paul Anka	9	15 October 2005	1
22 October 2005	5	Taller in More Ways	Sugababes	1	22 October 2005	1
22 October 2005	1	As Is Now	Paul Weller	4	22 October 2005	1
22 October 2005	1	Greatest Hits	Mariah Carey	7	29 October 2005	1
22 October 2005	1	Simple Gifts	Bryn Terfel	10	22 October 2005	1
29 October 2005	4	Their Law: The Singles 1990–2005	The Prodigy	1	29 October 2005	1
29 October 2005	2	Simplified	Simply Red	3	29 October 2005	1
29 October 2005	1	Playing the Angel	Depeche Mode	6	29 October 2005	1
5 November 2005	10	Intensive Care (#3)	Robbie Williams	1	5 November 2005	1
5 November 2005	1	#1's	Destiny's Child	6	5 November 2005	1
5 November 2005	1	Retrospectacle – The Supertramp Anthology	Supertramp	9	5 November 2005	1
12 November 2005	8	Face to Face (#6)	Westlife	1	12 November 2005	1
12 November 2005	2	Thanks for the Memory: The Great American Songbook, Volume IV	Rod Stewart	3	12 November 2005	1
12 November 2005	1	Living a Dream	Katherine Jenkins	4	12 November 2005	1
12 November 2005	1	Greatest Hits	Blink-182	6	12 November 2005	1
19 November 2005	7	Ancora	Il Divo	1	19 November 2005	1
19 November 2005	2	Aerial	Kate Bush	3	19 November 2005	1
19 November 2005	3	Ultimate Collection	Eurythmics	5	19 November 2005	1
19 November 2005	1	Pieces of a Dream	Anastacia	6	19 November 2005	1
26 November 2005	7	Confessions on a Dance Floor	Madonna	1	26 November 2005	2
26 November 2005	6	Never Forget – The Ultimate Collection	Take That	2	26 November 2005	1
26 November 2005	1	Bullet in a Bible	Green Day	6	26 November 2005	1
26 November 2005	1	Down in Albion	Babyshambles	10	26 November 2005	1
3 December 2005	10	Keep On	Will Young	2	3 December 2005	1
3 December 2005	1	Amarantine	Enya	8	3 December 2005	1
10 December 2005	8	Curtain Call: The Hits (#9)	Eminem	1	10 December 2005	5
10 December 2005	1	G4 & Friends	G4	6	10 December 2005	1

== Entries by artist ==
The following table shows artists who achieved two or more top 10 entries in 2005, including albums that reached their peak in 2004. The figures only include main artists, with featured artists and appearances on compilation albums not counted individually for each artist. The total number of weeks an artist spent in the top ten in 2005 is also shown.

Entries	Artist	Weeks	Albums
2	Eminem	9	Curtain Call: The Hits, Encore
2	Franz Ferdinand	10	Franz Ferdinand, You Could Have It So Much Better
2	G4	9	G4, G4 & Friends
2	Green Day	13	American Idiot, Bullet in a Bible
2	Il Divo	11	Ancora, Il Divo
2	Mariah Carey	7	Greatest Hits, The Emancipation of Mimi
2	Robbie Williams	12	Greatest Hits, Intensive Care
2	Westlife	9	...Allow Us to Be Frank, Face to Face

== Notes ==
- Stars of CCTV reached its peak of number-one on 28 January 2006 (week ending).
- Breakaway reached its peak of number three on 7 January 2006 (week ending).
- Employment reached its peak of number two on 25 February 2006 (week ending).
- In Between Dreams reached its peak of number-one on 4 March 2006 (week ending).
- PCD reached its peak of number seven on 8 July 2006 (week ending).
- Hopes and Fears re-entered the top 10 at number 6 on 15 January 2005 (week ending) for 10 weeks, at number 5 on 16 July 2005 (week ending) and at number 9 on 30 July 2005 (week ending) for 2 weeks.
- Il Divo re-entered the top 10 at number 6 on 5 March 2005 (week ending) for 2 weeks.
- Love Songs: A Compilation… Old and New re-entered the top 10 at number 9 on 19 February 2005 (week ending) and at number 10 on 12 March 2005 (week ending).
- How to Dismantle an Atomic Bomb re-entered the top 10 at number 10 on 22 January 2005 (week ending) and at number 10 on 26 February 2005 (week ending).
- Mind Body & Soul re-entered the top 10 at number 9 on 26 February 2005 (week ending).
- American Idiot re-entered the top 10 at number-one on 8 January 2005 (week ending) for 9 weeks, at number 9 on 2 April 2005 (week ending), and at number 7 on 30 July 2005 (week ending) for 2 weeks.
- Greatest Hits (Robbie Williams album) re-entered the top 10 at number 5 on 7 January 2006 (week ending) for 2 weeks.
- Speakerboxxx/The Love Below re-entered the top 10 at number 8 on 8 January 2005 (week ending).
- Kasabian re-entered the top 10 at number 4 on 22 January 2005 (week ending) for 3 weeks.
- Love. Angel. Music. Baby. re-entered the top 10 at number 7 on 26 March 2005 (week ending) for 4 weeks and at number 8 on 7 May 2005 (week ending) for 7 weeks.
- Tourist re-entered the top 10 at number 5 on 21 May 2005 (week ending) for 3 weeks.
- It's Time re-entered the top 10 at number 9 on 12 March 2005 (week ending).
- The Massacre re-entered the top 10 at number 8 on 21 May 2005 (week ending).
- Employment re-entered the top 10 at number 9 on 16 April 2005 (week ending) for 10 weeks, at number 7 on 9 July 2005 (week ending) for 12 weeks and at number 7 on 7 January 2006 (week ending) for 10 weeks.
- The Singles re-entered the top 10 at number 8 on 2 July 2005 (week ending) for 2 weeks.
- Finally Woken re-entered the top 10 at number 6 on 2 July 2005 (week ending) for 2 weeks.
- The Emancipation of Mimi re-entered the top 10 at number 9 on 2 July 2005 (week ending) for 5 weeks.
- Up All Night re-entered the top 10 at number 5 on 30 April 2005 (week ending) for 2 weeks and at number 9 on 16 July 2005 (week ending) for 2 weeks.
- Eye to the Telescope re-entered the top 10 at number 10 on 11 June 2005 (week ending) for 2 weeks, at number 7 on 10 September 2005 (week ending) for 8 weeks, at number 6 on 14 January 2006 (week ending) for 2 weeks and at number 4 on 25 February 2006 (week ending) for 5 weeks.
- Demon Days re-entered the top 10 at number 8 on 6 August 2005 (week ending) for 8 weeks, at number 10 on 3 December 2005 (week ending) for 2 weeks, at number 9 on 24 December 2005 (week ending) for 5 weeks and at number 7 on 25 February 2006 (week ending) for 3 weeks.
- Back to Bedlam re-entered the top 10 at number 10 on 10 December 2005 (week ending) for 15 weeks.
- Don't Believe the Truth re-entered the top 10 at number 9 on 13 August 2005 (week ending) for 2 weeks.
- Monkey Business re-entered the top 10 at number 10 on 22 April 2006 (week ending).
- X & Y re-entered the top 10 at number 8 on 25 February 2006 (week ending).
- The Magic Numbers re-entered the top 10 at number 8 on 20 August 2005 (week ending) for 2 weeks.
- The War of the Worlds originally peaked outside the top ten at number 24 upon its initial release in 1996. The album reached a new peak of number 23 the following year. It re-entered the top 10 at number 6 on 9 July 2005 (week ending) for 8 weeks.
- Stars of CCTV re-entered the top 10 at number 4 on 7 January 2006 (week ending) for 6 weeks.
- Breakaway re-entered the top 10 at number 8 on 10 September 2005 (week ending) for 7 weeks, at number 7 on 5 November 2005 (week ending) for 2 weeks, at number 9 on 26 November 2005 (week ending) for 8 weeks, at number 10 on 28 January 2006 (week ending) and at number 10 on 11 February 2006 (week ending) for 4 weeks.
- In Between Dreams re-entered the top 10 at number 9 on 28 January 2006 (week ending), at number 6 on 25 February 2006 (week ending) for 10 weeks and at number 10 on 13 May 2006 (week ending) for 4 weeks.
- PCD re-entered the top 10 at number 10 on 17 December 2005 (week ending) for 2 weeks, at number 9 on 7 January 2006 (week ending) and at number 7 on 8 July 2006 (week ending) for 2 weeks.
- Piece by Piece re-entered the top 10 at number 10 on 19 November 2005 (week ending), at number 10 on 24 December 2005 (week ending) for 2 weeks and at number 9 on 14 January 2006 (week ending) for 2 weeks.
- Taller in More Ways re-entered the top 10 at number 8 on 17 December 2005 (week ending).
- Greatest Hits (Mariah Carey album) originally peaked outside the top ten at number 46 upon its initial release in 2001.
- Keep On re-entered the top 10 at number 10 on 21 January 2006 (week ending) for 6 weeks and at number 10 on 6 May 2006 (week ending) for 3 weeks.
- Figure includes album that peaked in 2004.

== See also ==
- 2005 in British music
- List of number-one albums from the 2000s (UK)
