= List of UK top-ten albums in 2002 =

The UK Albums Chart is one of many music charts compiled by the Official Charts Company that calculates the best-selling albums of the week in the United Kingdom. Before 2004, the chart was only based on the sales of physical albums. This list shows albums that peaked in the top ten of the UK Albums Chart during 2002, as well as albums which peaked in 2001 and 2003 but were in the top ten in 2002. The entry date is when the album appeared in the top ten for the first time (week ending, as published by the Official Charts Company, which is six days after the chart is announced).

One-hundred and twenty-six albums were in the top ten this year. Sixteen albums from 2001 remained in the top 10 for several weeks at the beginning of the year, while Come Away with Me by Norah Jones, Justified by Justin Timberlake, Let Go by Avril Lavigne and Missundaztood by Pink were all released in 2002 but did not reach their peak until 2003. All Rise by Blue, Read My Lips by Sophie Ellis-Bextor and Songs in A Minor by Alicia Keys were the albums from 2001 to reach their peak in 2002. Four artists scored multiple entries in the top 10 in 2002. Avril Lavigne, Justin Timberlake, Pink, Shakira and Sugababes were among the many artists who achieved their first UK charting top 10 album in 2002.

The 2001 Christmas number-one album, Swing When You're Winning by Robbie Williams, remained at the top spot for the first two weeks of 2002. The first new number-one album of the year was Just Enough Education to Perform by Stereophonics. Overall, twenty-seven different albums peaked at number-one in 2002, with Robbie Williams (2) having the most albums hit that position.

== Background ==
=== Multiple entries ===
One-hundred and twenty-six albums charted in the top 10 in 2002, with one-hundred and nine albums reaching their peak this year (including The Platinum Collection and The Very Best of Sting & The Police, which both charted in previous years but reached a peak on their latest chart run).

Four artists scored multiple entries in the top 10 in 2002. Badly Drawn Boy, Blue, Robbie Williams and Westlife were the acts who had two top 10 albums this year. Badly Drawn Boy's two entries were both released this year.

=== Chart debuts ===
Forty-three artists achieved their first top 10 album in 2002 as a lead artist. Badly Drawn Boy had one more entry in his breakthrough year.

The following table (collapsed on desktop site) does not include acts who had previously charted as part of a group and secured their first top 10 solo album, or featured appearances on compilations or other artists recordings.

Artist	Number of top 10s	First entry	Chart position	Other entries
Jools Holland	1	Small World Big Band	8	—
Gordon Haskell	1	Harry's Bar	2	—
Sum 41	1	All Killer No Filler	7	—
Aaliyah	1	Aaliyah	5	—
Ja Rule	1	Pain Is Love	3	—
Howard Shore	1	The Lord of the Rings: The Fellowship of the Ring: Original Motion Picture Soundtrack	10	—
Enrique Iglesias	1	Escape	1	—
Pink	1	Missundaztood ^{[A]}	2	—
The Hives	1	Your New Favourite Band	7	—
Nickelback	1	Silver Side Up	1	—
Brandy	1	Full Moon	9	—
Shakira	1	Laundry Service	2	—
Beverley Knight	1	Who I Am	7	—
Gomez	1	In Our Gun	8	—
Badly Drawn Boy	2	About a Boy	6	Have You Fed the Fish? (10)
Hank Marvin	1	Guitar Player	10	—
Doves	1	The Last Broadcast	1	—
Kosheen	1	Resist	8	—
Hundred Reasons	1	Ideas Above Our Station	6	—
Liberty X	1	Thinking It Over	3	—
Ian Van Dahl	1	Ace	7	—
Norah Jones	1	Come Away with Me ^{[B]}	1	—
DJ Shadow	1	The Private Press	8	—
New Found Glory	1	Sticks and Stones	10	—
Nelly	1	Nellyville	2	—
The Vines	1	Highly Evolved	3	—
Idlewild	1	The Remote Part	3	—
Ashanti	1	Ashanti	3	—
The Coral	1	The Coral	5	—
Beth Orton	1	Daybreaker	8	—
Vanessa Carlton	1	Be Not Nobody	2	—
Röyksopp	1	Melody A.M.	9	—
Sugababes	1	Angels with Dirty Faces	2	—
Queens of the Stone Age	1	Songs for the Deaf	4	—
The Music	1	The Music	4	—
Ms. Dynamite	1	A Little Deeper	10	—
Avril Lavigne	1	Let Go ^{[C]}	1	—
Will Young	1	From Now On	1	—
Holly Valance	1	Footprints	9	—
S Club Juniors	1	Together	5	—
Gareth Gates	1	What My Heart Wants to Say	2	—
Justin Timberlake	1	Justified ^{[D]}	1	—
Darius	1	Dive In	6	—

Notes

Darren Hayes scored two top 10 albums with the group Savage Garden prior to the launch of his solo career; debut release Spin peaked at number 2 in April 2002. Justin Timberlake's first post-NSYNC project Justified rose to number-one in February 2003; none of the group's three albums had reached the top 10.

=== Soundtracks ===
Soundtrack albums for various films entered the top 10 throughout the year. These included About a Boy, The Lord of the Rings: The Fellowship of the Ring: Original Motion Picture Soundtrack and Spirit: Stallion of the Cimarron.

=== Best-selling albums ===
Robbie Williams had the best-selling album of the year with Escapology. The album spent fourteen weeks in the top 10 (including seven weeks at number one), sold over 1.2 million copies and was certified 5× platinum by the BPI. Missundaztood by Pink came in second place. Enrique Iglesias' Escape, A Rush of Blood to the Head from Coldplay and One Love by Blue made up the top five. Albums by Red Hot Chili Peppers, Eminem, Westlife, Elvis Presley and Oasis were also in the top ten best-selling albums of the year.

== Top-ten albums ==
Key

Symbol	Meaning
‡	Album peaked in 2001 but still in chart in 2002.
♦	Album released in 2002 but peaked in 2003.
(#)	Year-end top-ten album position and rank
Entered	The date that the album first appeared in the chart.
Peak	Highest position that the album reached in the UK Albums Chart.

Entered (week ending)	Weeks in top 10	Album	Artist	Peak	Peak reached (week ending)	Weeks at peak
Albums in 2001
27 January 2001	53	No Angel ‡	Dido	1	10 February 2001	7
24 March 2001	8	Whoa, Nelly! ‡	Nelly Furtado	2	15 September 2001	1
21 April 2001	22	Just Enough Education to Perform ‡	Stereophonics	1	21 April 2001	5
15 September 2001	8	A Funk Odyssey ‡	Jamiroquai	1	15 September 2001	2
15 September 2001	11	Read My Lips	Sophie Ellis-Bextor	2	29 June 2002	2
13 October 2001	20	Fever ‡	Kylie Minogue	1	13 October 2001	2
27 October 2001	11	Gold: Greatest Hits ‡	Steps	1	27 October 2001	3
10 November 2001	2	Lickin' on Both Sides ‡	Mis-Teeq	3	10 November 2001	1
10 November 2001	8	Songs in A Minor	Alicia Keys	6	30 March 2002	1
17 November 2001	2	Britney ‡	Britney Spears	4	17 November 2001	1
24 November 2001	11	World of Our Own ‡	Westlife	1	24 November 2001	1
24 November 2001	9	Dreams Can Come True, Greatest Hits Vol. 1 ‡	Gabrielle	2	15 December 2001	4
24 November 2001	6	Their Greatest Hits: The Record ‡	Bee Gees	5	24 November 2001	1
1 December 2001	13	Swing When You're Winning ‡	Robbie Williams	1	1 December 2001	7
8 December 2001	14	All Rise	Blue	1	4 May 2002	1
8 December 2001	8	Sunshine ‡	S Club 7	3	8 December 2001	4
Albums in 2002
5 January 2002	11	Freak of Nature	Anastacia	4	4 May 2002	2
12 January 2002	4	Small World Big Band	Jools Holland	8	12 January 2002	3
19 January 2002	3	Harry's Bar	Gordon Haskell	2	19 January 2002	1
26 January 2002	2	All Killer No Filler	Sum 41	7	26 January 2002	1
2 February 2002	2	Aaliyah	Aaliyah	5	2 February 2002	1
2 February 2002	5	Pain Is Love	Ja Rule	3	16 February 2002	1
2 February 2002	1	The Lord of the Rings: The Fellowship of the Ring: Original Motion Picture Soundtrack	Howard Shore	10	2 February 2002	1
9 February 2002	2	Come with Us	The Chemical Brothers	1	9 February 2002	1
9 February 2002	26	Escape (#3)	Enrique Iglesias	1	16 February 2002	2
9 February 2002	31	Missundaztood ♦ (#2)	Pink	2	18 January 2003	1
9 February 2002	2	Your New Favourite Band	The Hives	7	16 February 2002	1
16 February 2002	16	Silver Side Up	Nickelback	1	23 March 2002	2
16 February 2002	2	A Fine Romance: The Love Songs of Frank Sinatra	Frank Sinatra	6	23 February 2002	1
16 February 2002	6	Legacy: The Greatest Hits Collection	Boyz II Men	2	23 February 2002	1
2 March 2002	5	The Very Best of Sting & The Police	Sting & The Police	1	2 March 2002	2
9 March 2002	9	The Essential Barbra Streisand	Barbra Streisand	1	16 March 2002	1
9 March 2002	1	Full Moon	Brandy	9	9 March 2002	1
16 March 2002	2	Under Rug Swept	Alanis Morissette	2	16 March 2002	1
23 March 2002	11	Laundry Service	Shakira	2	24 August 2002	1
23 March 2002	1	Who I Am	Beverley Knight	7	23 March 2002	1
30 March 2002	8	J to tha L–O! The Remixes	Jennifer Lopez	4	30 March 2002	1
30 March 2002	1	In Our Gun	Gomez	8	30 March 2002	1
6 April 2002	6	A New Day Has Come	Celine Dion	1	6 April 2002	4
13 April 2002	5	Spin	Darren Hayes	2	13 April 2002	1
13 April 2002	1	Release	Pet Shop Boys	7	13 April 2002	1
20 April 2002	3	C'mon, C'mon	Sheryl Crow	2	20 April 2002	1
20 April 2002	5	About a Boy	Badly Drawn Boy	6	20 April 2002	1
20 April 2002	1	Guitar Player	Hank Marvin	10	20 April 2002	1
11 May 2002	3	The Last Broadcast	Doves	1	11 May 2002	2
11 May 2002	1	Frantic	Bryan Ferry	6	11 May 2002	1
18 May 2002	1	The Sound of the Jam	The Jam	3	18 May 2002	1
18 May 2002	3	No More Drama	Mary J. Blige	4	25 May 2002	1
18 May 2002	2	Resist	Kosheen	8	25 May 2002	1
25 May 2002	3	18	Moby	1	25 May 2002	1
25 May 2002	13	The Platinum Collection	Queen	2	25 May 2002	3
25 May 2002	1	Down the Road	Van Morrison	6	25 May 2002	1
1 June 2002	6	Destination	Ronan Keating	1	1 June 2002	1
1 June 2002	3	Together	Lulu	4	1 June 2002	1
1 June 2002	1	Ideas Above Our Station	Hundred Reasons	6	1 June 2002	1
8 June 2002	14	The Eminem Show (#7)	Eminem	1	8 June 2002	5
8 June 2002	3	Thinking it Over	Liberty X	3	8 June 2002	1
8 June 2002	2	Ace	Ian Van Dahl	7	8 June 2002	1
8 June 2002	29	Come Away with Me ♦	Norah Jones	1	8 March 2003	4
15 June 2002	1	The Private Press	DJ Shadow	8	15 June 2002	1
22 June 2002	1	Untouchables	Korn	4	22 June 2002	1
22 June 2002	1	Heathen	David Bowie	5	22 June 2002	1
22 June 2002	2	Big Squeeze: The Very Best of Squeeze	Squeeze	8	22 June 2002	1
22 June 2002	1	The Definitive Everly Brothers	The Everly Brothers	10	22 June 2002	1
29 June 2002	1	Lovehatetragedy	Papa Roach	4	29 June 2002	1
29 June 2002	1	Sticks and Stones	New Found Glory	10	29 June 2002	1
13 July 2002	14	Heathen Chemistry (#10)	Oasis	1	13 July 2002	1
13 July 2002	11	Nellyville	Nelly	2	13 July 2002	2
13 July 2002	1	Charango	Morcheeba	7	13 July 2002	1
13 July 2002	1	Hullabaloo Soundtrack	Muse	10	13 July 2002	1
20 July 2002	28	By the Way (#6)	Red Hot Chili Peppers	1	20 July 2002	5
20 July 2002	1	Highly Evolved	The Vines	3	20 July 2002	1
20 July 2002	1	Hard Candy	Counting Crows	9	20 July 2002	1
20 July 2002	1	Voodoo Child: The Jimi Hendrix Collection	Jimi Hendrix	10	20 July 2002	1
27 July 2002	2	The Remote Part	Idlewild	3	27 July 2002	1
27 July 2002	3	Ashanti	Ashanti	3	3 August 2002	1
27 July 2002	1	Spirit: Stallion of the Cimarron	Bryan Adams	8	27 July 2002	1
3 August 2002	1	O, Yeah! Ultimate Aerosmith Hits	Aerosmith	6	3 August 2002	1
10 August 2002	3	The Rising	Bruce Springsteen	1	10 August 2002	1
10 August 2002	3	Reanimation	Linkin Park	3	10 August 2002	2
10 August 2002	1	The Coral	The Coral	5	10 August 2002	1
10 August 2002	2	Push the Beat for This Jam (The Singles '94–'02)	Scooter	6	10 August 2002	1
10 August 2002	1	Daybreaker	Beth Orton	8	10 August 2002	1
17 August 2002	3	Be Not Nobody	Vanessa Carlton	7	17 August 2002	1
17 August 2002	1	Evil Heat	Primal Scream	9	17 August 2002	1
24 August 2002	2	Melody A.M.	Röyksopp	9	24 August 2002	1
31 August 2002	5	Imagine	Eva Cassidy	1	31 August 2002	1
31 August 2002	1	Magic Hotel	Toploader	3	31 August 2002	1
7 September 2002	31	A Rush of Blood to the Head (#4)	Coldplay	1	7 September 2002	3
7 September 2002	7	Angels with Dirty Faces	Sugababes	2	7 September 2002	1
7 September 2002	1	Songs for the Deaf	Queens of the Stone Age	4	7 September 2002	1
14 September 2002	1	The Music	The Music	4	14 September 2002	1
21 September 2002	5	Feels So Good	Atomic Kitten	1	21 September 2002	1
21 September 2002	1	Intergalactic Sonic 7″s	Ash	3	21 September 2002	1
28 September 2002	2	Illumination	Paul Weller	1	28 September 2002	1
28 September 2002	1	A Little Deeper	Ms Dynamite	10	28 September 2002	1
5 October 2002	9	ELV1S: 30 No. 1 Hits (#9)	Elvis Presley	1	5 October 2002	2
5 October 2002	1	Bounce	Bon Jovi	2	5 October 2002	1
5 October 2002	28	Let Go ♦	Avril Lavigne	1	11 January 2003	3
12 October 2002	4	Forty Licks	The Rolling Stones	2	12 October 2002	3
12 October 2002	2	The Ragpicker's Dream	Mark Knopfler	7	12 October 2002	1
12 October 2002	1	Life on Other Planets	Supergrass	9	12 October 2002	1
19 October 2002	4	From Now On	Will Young	1	19 October 2002	2
26 October 2002	1	The Very Best of Fleetwood Mac	Fleetwood Mac	7	26 October 2002	1
26 October 2002	1	Footprints	Holly Valance	9	19 October 2002	1
2 November 2002	4	One by One	Foo Fighters	1	2 November 2002	1
2 November 2002	1	Human Conditions	Richard Ashcroft	3	2 November 2002	1
2 November 2002	1	Together	S Club Juniors	5	2 November 2002	1
2 November 2002	1	Comfort in Sound	Feeder	6	2 November 2002	1
9 November 2002	10	A New Day at Midnight	David Gray	1	9 November 2002	1
9 November 2002	4	What My Heart Wants to Say	Gareth Gates	2	9 November 2002	1
9 November 2002	3	Nirvana	Nirvana	3	9 November 2002	1
9 November 2002	2	Forever Delayed - The Greatest Hits	Manic Street Preachers	4	9 November 2002	1
16 November 2002	10	One Love (#5)	Blue	1	16 November 2002	1
16 November 2002	2	The Best of 1990-2000 & B-Sides	U2	2	16 November 2002	1
16 November 2002	24	Justified ♦	Justin Timberlake	1	1 February 2003	7
16 November 2002	2	Sentimento	Andrea Bocelli with Lorin Maazel and the London Symphony Orchestra	7	16 November 2002	1
16 November 2002	1	Have You Fed the Fish?	Badly Drawn Boy	10	16 November 2002	1
23 November 2002	9	Unbreakable: The Greatest Hits Volume 1 (#8)	Westlife	1	23 November 2002	1
23 November 2002	11	Greatest Hits 1970–2002	Elton John	3	23 November 2002	2
23 November 2002	1	Slicker Than Your Average	Craig David	4	23 November 2002	1
30 November 2002	14	Escapology (#1)	Robbie Williams	1	30 November 2002	7
30 November 2002	2	Up!	Shania Twain	4	30 November 2002	1
30 November 2002	2	It Had to Be You: The Great American Songbook	Rod Stewart	8	30 November 2002	1
7 December 2002	1	Encore	Lionel Richie	8	7 December 2002	1
14 December 2002	1	Dive In	Darius	6	14 December 2002	1

== Entries by artist ==
The following table shows artists who achieved two or more top 10 entries in 2002, including albums that reached their peak in 2001. The figures only include main artists, with featured artists and appearances on compilation albums not counted individually for each artist. The total number of weeks an artist spent in the top ten in 2002 is also shown.

Entries	Artist	Weeks	Albums
2	Badly Drawn Boy	6	About a Boy, Have You Fed the Fish?
2	Blue	17	All Rise, One Love
2	Robbie Williams	13	Escapology, Swing When You're Winning
2	Westlife	11	Unbreakable: The Greatest Hits Volume 1, World of Our Own

== Notes ==
- ^{a} Missundaztood reached its peak of number two on 18 January 2003 (week ending).
- ^{b} Come Away with Me reached its peak of number one on 8 March 2003 (week ending).
- ^{c} Let Go reached its peak of number one on 11 January 2003 (week ending).
- ^{d} Justified reached its peak of number one on 1 February 2003.
- All Rise re-entered the top 10 at number 7 on 30 March 2002 (week ending) for 2 weeks.
- Just Enough Education to Perform re-entered the top 10 at number 4 on 5 January 2002 (week ending) for 10 weeks.
- Sunshine re-entered the top 10 at number 8 on 2 March 2002 (week ending).
- World of Our Own re-entered the top 10 at number 7 on 23 February 2002 (week ending) for 4 weeks.
- No Angel re-entered the top 10 at number 7 on 5 January 2002 (week ending) for 6 weeks, at number 9 on 23 February 2002 (week ending) for 5 weeks and at number 8 on 6 July 2002 (week ending) for 2 weeks.
- Gold: The Greatest Hits re-entered the top 10 at number 8 on 5 January 2002 (week ending) for 2 weeks.
- Freak of Nature re-entered the top 10 at number 10 on 30 March 2002 (week ending) and at number 10 on 13 April 2002 (week ending) for 6 weeks.
- Their Greatest Hits: The Record re-entered the top 10 at number 6 on 29 December 2001 (week ending) for 2 weeks.
- Read My Lips re-entered the top 10 at number 9 on 12 January 2002 (week ending) for 5 weeks and at number 2 on 29 June 2002 (week ending) for 5 weeks.
- Songs in A Minor re-entered the top 10 at number 10 on 19 January 2002 (week ending) for 2 weeks and at number 8 on 23 March 2002 (week ending) for 4 weeks.
- Whoa Nelly re-entered the top 10 at number 6 on 26 January 2002 (week ending).
- Escape re-entered the top 10 at number 10 on 4 May 2002 (week ending) for 13 weeks and at number 5 on 24 August 2002 (week ending) for 6 weeks.
- Missundaztood re-entered the top 10 at number 7 on 25 May 2002 (week ending) for 4 weeks and at number 10 on 24 August 2002 (week ending) for 25 weeks.
- Legacy: The Greatest Hits Collection re-entered the top 10 at number 9 on 6 April 2002 (week ending).
- Fever re-entered the top 10 at number 8 on 23 February 2002 (week ending) for 5 weeks, at number 10 on 6 April 2002 (week ending), at number 10 on 18 May 2002 (week ending) for 3 weeks and at number 9 on 22 June 2002 (week ending) for 4 weeks.
- The Very Best of Sting & The Police originally peaked outside the top 10 at number 11 upon its initial release in 1997.
- A Funk Odyssey re-entered the top 10 at number 9 on 16 March 2002 (week ending) for 4 weeks.
- Laundry Service re-entered the top 10 at number 10 on 3 August 2002 (week ending) for 7 weeks.
- J to tha L–O! The Remixes re-entered the top 10 at number 7 on 6 July 2002 (week ending).
- Britney re-entered the top 10 at number 10 on 27 April 2002 (week ending).
- The Platinum Collection originally peaked outside the top 10 at number 63 upon its initial release in 2000.
- The Eminem Show re-entered the top 10 at number 9 on 31 August 2002 (week ending) for 3 weeks, at number 8 on 28 September 2002 (week ending) and at number 8 on 8 February 2003 (week ending).
- Thinking It Over re-entered the top 10 at number 10 on 5 October 2002 (week ending).
- Come Away with Me re-entered the top 10 at number 6 on 17 August 2002 (week ending) for 3 weeks, at number 10 on 14 September 2002 (week ending) for 2 weeks, at number 3 on 10 December 2002 (week ending) for 3 weeks, at number 10 on 22 February 2003 (week ending) for 14 weeks and at number 10 on 20 September 2003 (week ending) for 2 weeks.
- Lickin' on Both Sides re-entered the top 10 at number 10 on 6 July 2002 (week ending).
- Heathen Chemistry re-entered the top 10 at number 8 on 21 September 2002 (week ending) for 5 weeks.
- Nellyville re-entered the top 10 at number 5 on 28 September 2002 (week ending) for 7 weeks.
- By the Way re-entered the top 10 at number 10 on 9 November 2002 (week ending), at number 8 on 21 December 2002 (week ending) for 15 weeks, at number 10 on 12 April 2003 (week ending) and at number 10 on 26 April 2003 (week ending).
- Melody AM re-entered the top 10 at number 10 on 8 February 2003 (week ending).
- A Rush of Blood to the Head re-entered the top 10 at number 10 on 21 December 2002 (week ending) for 6 weeks, at number 6 on 1 March 2003 (week ending) for 12 weeks and at number 6 on 4 October 2003 (week ending) for 3 weeks.
- ^{h} Angels with Dirty Faces re-entered the top 10 at number 10 on 11 January 2003 (week ending) for 3 weeks and at number 10 on 15 March 2003 (week ending).
- ELV1S: 30 No. 1 Hits re-entered the top 10 at number 9 on 30 November 2002 (week ending), at number 10 on 14 December 2002 and at number 10 on 28 December 2002 (week ending) for 2 weeks.
- Feels So Good re-entered the top 10 at number 9 on 14 December 2002 (week ending) for 2 weeks.
- Let Go re-entered the top 10 at number 10 on 7 December 2002 (week ending) for 24 weeks.
- ^{i} One By One re-entered the top 10 at number 9 on 25 January 2003 (week ending) for 2 weeks.
- Justified re-entered the top 10 at number 8 on 18 January 2003 (week ending) for eleven weeks and at number 7 on 19 April 2003 (week ending) for twelve weeks.
- The Greatest Hits 1970-2002 re-entered the top 10 at number 6 on 13 September 2003 (week ending) for 2 weeks and at number 8 on 22 November 2003 (week ending).
- Escapology re-entered the top 10 at number 1 on 16 August 2003 (week ending) for 4 weeks.
- Figure includes album that peaked in 2001.
- Figure includes album that first charted in 2001 but peaked in 2002.

== See also ==
- 2002 in British music
- List of number-one albums from the 2000s (UK)
