= Half Man Half Machine =

Single by Goldie Lookin' Chain

from the album Greatest Hits
- Released: 2004
- Genre: Hip-Hop
- Length: 3:39
- Label: Must Destroy/Atlantic Records
- Songwriter(s): Rhys Hutchings; John Rutledge; Adam Sadler
- Producer(s): P Xain

Goldie Lookin' Chain singles chronology
"Half Man Half Machine" (2004)	"Guns Don't Kill People Rappers Do" (2004)

Half Man Half Machine
First 30 seconds of full version

"Half Man Half Machine" is a song by the Welsh rap act Goldie Lookin Chain from their Greatest Hits album. In May 2004, the song reached #32 on the UK Singles Chart.

== Track listing ==
- A1 Half Man Half Machine
- A2 Half Man Half Machine (Clean)
- A3 Half Man Half Machine (Instrumental)
- B1 Self Suicide
- B2 Self Suicide (Clean)
- B3 Self Suicide (Instrumental)
