= Your Mother's Got a Penis =

- Censored cover

Single by Goldie Lookin' Chain

from the album Greatest Hits
- Released: 2004
- Genre: Hip hop
- Length: 2:29
- Label: Must Destroy/Atlantic
- Songwriters: Rhys Hutchings; Chris Mosdell; John Rutledge; Ryuichi Sakamoto
- Producer: P Xain

Goldie Lookin' Chain singles chronology
"Guns Don't Kill People Rappers Do" (2004)	"Your Mother's Got a Penis" (2004)	"You Knows I Loves You" (2004)

"Your Mother's Got a Penis" (referred to as simply "Your Mother" on BBC Radio 1) is a song by the British rap act Goldie Lookin Chain from their Greatest Hits album, released In November 2004. The song reached number fourteen on the UK Singles Chart.

With an accompanying video based on a supermarket theme, "Your Mother's Got a Penis" first appeared on their album, The Manifesto.

The song's chorus is a sample of Greg Phillinganes' cover of "Behind the Mask" by Yellow Magic Orchestra, for which the song's writers Ryuichi Sakamoto and Chris Mosdell received a full writing credit.

== MTV Controversy ==
The song and its music video was the subject of an Ofcom complaint that its content was "offensive to transsexuals" and unsuitable for a daytime broadcast. MTV UK defended the song stating that "neither the tone of the song or video was offensive to transsexuals", although they confirmed that the video had been "substantially edited" to remove swearing and explicit references to genitalia and sex. Ofcom concurred with this assessment but prohibited the song from being broadcast in any future pre-watershed slots.
