= Asbo4Life =

Studio album by Goldie Lookin Chain
- Released: 30 March 2009
- Genre: Hip hop
- Length: 42:54
- Label: Gold Dust Records
- Producer: P Xain aka Rhys From GLC

Goldie Lookin Chain chronology
Under The Counter (2008)	Asbo4Life (2009)	The Mix Tape Two (2010)

Singles from Asbo4Life
- 1. "By Any Means Necessary" Released: 16 March 2009

Professional ratings
Review scores
Source	Rating
NME	(1/10)
Female First	2/5 stars
Music Omh	3.5/5 stars
inthenews.co.uk	(6/10)
Sunday Express	3/5 stars
Daily Music Guide	4.5/5 stars
Music-news.com	3/5 stars
The Music Fix	(6/10)

Asbo4Life is the fourth studio album by Welsh hip-hop/rap group Goldie Lookin Chain.

== Track listing ==
1. "Mister Faharenheit" - 2:52
2. "Everybody is a DJ"
3. "Disguise"
4. "By Any Means Necessary"
5. "Welcome To Germany"
6. "Apathy"
7. "3D"
8. "Nothing Ever Happens"
9. "Space Police"
10. "Rollin"
11. "Strobe Lights"
12. "Unemployed and Over Drawn"
13. "Garlic Bread"
14. "New Day"
