= List of UK top-ten albums in 2003 =

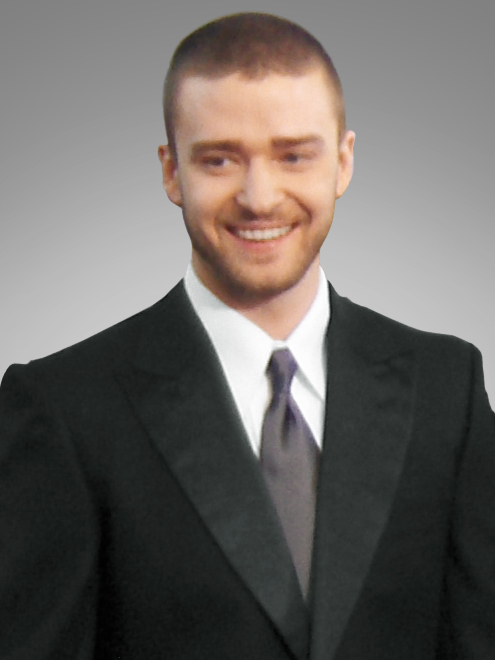
Justin Timberlake's debut solo album Justified was the second best selling album in the UK in 2003. The album had entered the top 10 on 16 November 2002 but did not reach its number-one peak until 1 February 2003. The album spent seven non-consecutive weeks at the album chart summit and lasted 24 weeks in the top 10 altogether.

The UK Albums Chart is one of many music charts compiled by the Official Charts Company that calculates the best-selling albums of the week in the United Kingdom. Before 2004, the chart was only based on the sales of physical albums. This list shows albums that peaked in the Top 10 of the UK Albums Chart during 2003, as well as albums which peaked in 2002 and 2004 but were in the top 10 in 2003. The entry date is when the album appeared in the top 10 for the first time (week ending, as published by the Official Charts Company, which is six days after the chart is announced).

One-hundred and twenty-two albums were in the top ten this year. Sixteen albums from 2002 remained in the top 10 for several weeks at the beginning of the year, while Elephunk by The Black Eyed Peas and Twentysomething by Jamie Cullum were both released in 2003 but did not reach their peak until 2004. Come Away with Me by Norah Jones, Justified by Justin Timberlake, Let Go by Avril Lavigne and Missundaztood by Pink were the albums from 2002 to reach their peak in 2003. Eleven artists scored multiple entries in the top 10 in 2003. 50 Cent, Busted, Girls Aloud, Michael Bublé and Sean Paul were among the many artists who achieved their first UK charting top 10 album in 2003.

The first number-one album of the year was Let Go by Avril Lavigne. Overall, twenty-five different albums peaked at number-one in 2003, with twenty-five unique artists hitting that position.

== Background ==
=== Multiple entries ===
One-hundred and twenty-two albums charted in the top 10 in 2003, with one-hundred and eight albums reaching their peak this year (including Their Greatest Hits: The Record and The Very Best of Cat Stevens, which both charted in previous years but reached a peak on their latest chart run).

Eleven artists scored multiple entries in the top 10 in 2003. Blue, Busted, Elvis Presley, Pink, Rachel Stevens, Red Hot Chili Peppers, R. Kelly, Robbie Williams, Sugababes and Westlife were the acts who had two top 10 albums this year. Busted and R. Kelly's two entries were both released this year.

=== Chart debuts ===
Twenty-nine artists achieved their first top 10 album in 2003 as a lead artist. Busted and R. Kelly both had one more entry in their breakthrough year.

The following table (collapsed on desktop site) does not include acts who had previously charted as part of a group and secured their first top 10 solo album, or featured appearances on compilations or other artists recordings.

Artist	Number of top 10s	First entry	Chart position	Other entries
Daniel Bedingfield	1	Gotta Get Thru This	2	—
Busted	2	Busted	2	A Present for Everyone (2)
Christina Aguilera	1	Stripped	2	—
50 Cent	1	Get Rich or Die Tryin'	2	—
Appleton	1	Everything's Eventual	9	—
Turin Brakes	1	Ether Song	4	—
The White Stripes	1	Elephant	1	—
David Sneddon	1	Seven Years – Ten Weeks	5	—
Evanescence	1	Fallen	1	—
R. Kelly	2	Chocolate Factory	10	The R. in R&B Collection, Vol. 1 (4)
Big Brovaz	1	Nu-Flow	6	—
Deftones	1	Deftones	7	—
Girls Aloud	1	Sound of the Underground	2	—
Delta Goodrem	1	Innocent Eyes	2	—
The Thrills	1	So Much for the City	3	—
Electric Six	1	Fire	7	—
The Darkness	1	Permission to Land	1	—
Kings of Leon	1	Youth & Young Manhood	3	—
Sean Paul	1	Dutty Rock	2	—
Elbow	1	Cast of Thousands	7	—
Black Rebel Motorcycle Club	1	Take Them On, On Your Own	3	—
The Cooper Temple Clause	1	Kick Up the Fire, and Let the Flames Break Loose	5	—
DMX	1	Grand Champ	6	—
Hayley Westenra	1	Pure	7	—
The Black Eyed Peas	1	Elephunk ^{[A]}	3	—
Michael Bublé	1	Michael Bublé	6	—
Jamie Cullum	1	Twentysomething ^{[B]}	3	—
Bryn Terfel	1	Bryn	6	—
Alex Parks	1	Introduction	5	—

Notes

As members of Destiny's Child, Kelly Rowland and Beyoncé had two top 10 albums to their name (The Writing's on the Wall in 1999 and Survivor two years later). Both had debut solo albums in 2003 that reached high positions - Beyoncé's Dangerously in Love and Kelly Rowland's Simply Deep topped the chart.

Ex Hear'Say singer Kym Marsh peaked at number 9 with her first and only solo album Standing Tall. Rachel Stevens broke out on her own after S Club went on hiatus and she made the top 10 with Funky Dory, her debut album.

=== Best-selling albums ===
Dido had the best-selling album of the year with Life for Rent. The album spent 21 weeks in the top 10 (including ten weeks at number one), sold over 2.168 million copies and was certified 6× platinum by the BPI. Justified by Justin Timberlake came in second place. Christina Aguilera's Stripped, Gotta Get Thru This from Daniel Bedingfield and Come Away with Me by Norah Jones made up the top five. Albums by The Darkness, Coldplay, Michael Jackson, Busted and R.E.M. were also in the top ten best-selling albums of the year.

== Top-ten albums ==
Key

Symbol	Meaning
‡	Album peaked in 2002 but still in chart in 2003.
♦	Album released in 2003 but peaked in 2004.
(#)	Year-end top-ten album position and rank
Entered	The date that the album first appeared in the chart.
Peak	Highest position that the album reached in the UK Albums Chart.

Entered (week ending)	Weeks in top 10	Single	Artist	Peak	Peak reached (week ending)	Weeks at peak
Albums in 2002
9 February 2002	31	Missundaztood	Pink	2	18 January 2003	1
8 June 2002	14	The Eminem Show ‡ ^{[C]}	Eminem	1	8 June 2002	5
8 June 2002	29	Come Away with Me ^{[D]} (#5)	Norah Jones	1	8 March 2003	4
20 July 2002	28	By the Way ‡ ^{[E]}	Red Hot Chili Peppers	1	20 July 2002	5
24 August 2002	2	Melody AM ‡ ^{[F]}	Röyksopp	9	24 August 2002	1
7 September 2002	31	A Rush of Blood to the Head ‡ ^{[G]} (#7)	Coldplay	1	7 September 2002	3
7 September 2002	7	Angels with Dirty Faces ‡ ^{[H]}	Sugababes	2	7 September 2002	1
5 October 2002	9	ELV1S: 30 No. 1 Hits ‡	Elvis Presley	1	5 October 2002	2
5 October 2002	28	Let Go	Avril Lavigne	1	11 January 2003	3
2 November 2002	4	One by One ‡ ^{[I]}	Foo Fighters	1	2 November 2002	1
9 November 2002	10	A New Day at Midnight ‡	David Gray	1	9 November 2002	1
16 November 2002	10	One Love ‡	Blue	1	16 November 2002	1
16 November 2002	24	Justified ^{[J]} (#2)	Justin Timberlake	1	1 February 2003	7
23 November 2002	9	Unbreakable: The Greatest Hits Volume 1 ‡	Westlife	1	23 November 2002	1
23 November 2002	11	Greatest Hits 1970–2002 ‡ ^{[K]}	Elton John	3	23 November 2002	2
30 November 2002	14	Escapology ‡ ^{[L]}	Robbie Williams	1	30 November 2002	7
Albums in 2003
18 January 2003	17	Gotta Get Thru This ^{[M]} (#4)	Daniel Bedingfield	2	2 August 2003	1
25 January 2003	17	Busted ^{[N]}	Busted	2	8 February 2003	2
1 February 2003	21	Stripped ^{[O]} (#3)	Christina Aguilera	2	15 March 2003	1
1 February 2003	3	Their Greatest Hits: The Record ^{[P]}	Bee Gees	5	8 February 2003	1
15 February 2003	4	Simply Deep	Kelly Rowland	1	15 February 2003	1
15 February 2003	2	Biography: The Greatest Hits	Lisa Stansfield	3	15 February 2003	1
15 February 2003	2	I Care 4 U	Aaliyah	4	15 February 2003	1
22 February 2003	2	100th Window	Massive Attack	1	22 February 2003	1
1 March 2003	8	Get Rich or Die Tryin' ^{[Q]}	50 Cent	2	1 March 2003	1
1 March 2003	5	Greatest Hits ^{[R]}	Tom Jones	2	8 March 2003	1
8 March 2003	1	Everything's Eventual	Appleton	9	8 March 2003	1
15 March 2003	1	Ether Song	Turin Brakes	4	15 March 2003	1
22 March 2003	1	Reason	Melanie C	5	22 March 2003	1
22 March 2003	5	Daniel in Blue Jeans: 20 Great Rock 'N' Roll Love Songs	Daniel O'Donnell	3	29 March 2003	1
29 March 2003	1	Back in the World Live	Paul McCartney	5	29 March 2003	1
29 March 2003	2	Ballads – The Love Song Collection	Boyzone	6	29 March 2003	2
29 March 2003	1	Neon Nights	Dannii Minogue	8	29 March 2003	1
5 April 2003	4	Meteora	Linkin Park	1	5 April 2003	1
5 April 2003	5	Home	Simply Red	2	5 April 2003	1
5 April 2003	1	One Heart	Celine Dion	4	5 April 2003	1
12 April 2003	10	Elephant	The White Stripes	1	12 April 2003	2
12 April 2003	1	Eye Candy	Mis-Teeq	6	12 April 2003	1
19 April 2003	1	The Very Best Of	Lighthouse Family	9	19 April 2003	1
3 May 2003	4	American Life	Madonna	1	3 May 2003	1
3 May 2003	1	Couldn't Have Said It Better	Meat Loaf	4	3 May 2003	1
10 May 2003	1	Seven Years – Ten Weeks	David Sneddon	5	10 May 2003	1
10 May 2003	2	Say You Will	Fleetwood Mac	6	10 May 2003	1
17 May 2003	3	Think Tank	Blur	1	17 May 2003	1
24 May 2003	1	The Golden Age of Grotesque	Marilyn Manson	4	24 May 2003	1
24 May 2003	16	Fallen ^{[S]}	Evanescence	1	28 June 2003	1
24 May 2003	3	Chocolate Factory	R. Kelly	10	24 May 2003	3
31 May 2003	3	Nu-Flow ^{[T]}	Big Brovaz	6	31 May 2003	1
31 May 2003	1	Deftones	Deftones	7	31 May 2003	1
31 May 2003	4	The Definitive ^{[U]}	The Drifters	8	31 May 2003	2
7 June 2003	1	Sound of the Underground	Girls Aloud	2	7 June 2003	1
7 June 2003	3	How the West Was Won	Led Zeppelin	5	7 June 2003	1
14 June 2003	10	You Gotta Go There to Come Back ^{[V]}	Stereophonics	1	14 June 2003	1
14 June 2003	4	Best: The Greatest Hits of S Club 7	S Club 7	2	14 June 2003	1
14 June 2003	3	St. Anger	Metallica	3	14 June 2003	1
14 June 2003	3	Labour of Love, Vols. I, II & III: The Platinum Collection	UB40	7	21 June 2003	1
21 June 2003	3	Hail to the Thief	Radiohead	1	21 June 2003	1
21 June 2003	3	Bare	Annie Lennox	3	21 June 2003	1
5 July 2003	9	Dangerously in Love ^{[W]}	Beyoncé	1	5 July 2003	5
5 July 2003	6	The Greatest Hits of George Benson	George Benson	4	5 July 2003	1
12 July 2003	9	Innocent Eyes ^{[X]}	Delta Goodrem	2	12 July 2003	2
12 July 2003	4	So Much for the City ^{[Y]}	The Thrills	3	12 July 2003	1
12 July 2003	1	Chapter II	Ashanti	5	12 July 2003	1
12 July 2003	3	Parts of the Process (The Very Best of Morcheeba)	Morcheeba	6	12 July 2003	1
12 July 2003	1	Fire	Electric Six	7	12 July 2003	1
19 July 2003	22	Permission to Land ^{[Z]} (#6)	The Darkness	1	6 September 2003	4
19 July 2003	2	Ultimate Collection	The Osmonds	4	19 July 2003	1
19 July 2003	7	Youth & Young Manhood ^{[AA]}	Kings of Leon	3	26 July 2003	1
2 August 2003	1	Phantom Power	Super Furry Animals	4	2 August 2003	1
2 August 2003	1	Standing Tall	Kym Marsh	9	2 August 2003	1
9 August 2003	4	Magic and Medicine	The Coral	1	9 August 2003	1
9 August 2003	9	Dutty Rock ^{[BB]}	Sean Paul	2	13 September 2003	1
9 August 2003	1	The Ultimate Yes: 35th Anniversary Collection	Yes	10	9 August 2003	1
23 August 2003	5	American Tune	Eva Cassidy	1	23 August 2003	2
23 August 2003	1	Kokopelli	Kosheen	7	23 August 2003	1
30 August 2003	1	Cast of Thousands	Elbow	7	30 August 2003	1
6 September 2003	1	Take Them On, On Your Own	Black Rebel Motorcycle Club	3	6 September 2003	1
6 September 2003	1	Love & Life	Mary J. Blige	8	6 September 2003	1
13 September 2003	2	You've Got a Friend: The Best of James Taylor	James Taylor	4	13 September 2003	1
20 September 2003	1	Dance of Death	Iron Maiden	2	20 September 2003	1
20 September 2003	1	Kick Up the Fire, and Let the Flames Break Loose	The Cooper Temple Clause	5	20 September 2003	1
27 September 2003	2	Silence Is Easy	Starsailor	2	27 September 2003	1
27 September 2003	1	Reality	David Bowie	3	27 September 2003	1
27 September 2003	1	Seal IV	Seal	4	27 September 2003	1
27 September 2003	1	Grand Champ	DMX	6	27 September 2003	1
27 September 2003	8	Pure ^{[CC]}	Hayley Westenra	7	22 November 2003	1
27 September 2003	17	Elephunk ♦ ^{[DD]}	The Black Eyed Peas	3	17 January 2004	4
4 October 2003	2	Absolution	Muse	1	4 October 2003	1
4 October 2003	2	Sacred Love	Sting	3	4 October 2003	1
4 October 2003	7	The R. in R&B Collection, Vol. 1	R. Kelly	4	4 October 2003	2
4 October 2003	2	The Long Road	Nickelback	5	4 October 2003	1
4 October 2003	1	Results May Vary	Limp Bizkit	7	4 October 2003	1
4 October 2003	1	Singles 93–03	The Chemical Brothers	9	4 October 2003	1
11 October 2003	21	Life for Rent (#1)	Dido	1	11 October 2003	10
11 October 2003	4	Live at Knebworth	Robbie Williams	2	11 October 2003	2
11 October 2003	1	Funky Dory	Rachel Stevens	9	11 October 2003	1
18 October 2003	2	ELVIIS: 2nd to None	Elvis Presley	4	18 October 2003	1
18 October 2003	2	Michael Bublé	Michael Bublé	6	18 October 2003	1
25 October 2003	5	The Very Best of Sheryl Crow ^{[EE]}	Sheryl Crow	2	25 October 2003	1
25 October 2003	2	12 Memories	Travis	3	25 October 2003	1
25 October 2003	3	The Very Best of Cat Stevens ^{[FF]}	Cat Stevens	6	1 November 2003	1
1 November 2003	2	Room on Fire	The Strokes	2	1 November 2003	1
1 November 2003	4	As Time Goes By: The Great American Songbook, Volume II	Rod Stewart	4	1 November 2003	1
1 November 2003	1	Careful What You Wish For	Texas	5	1 November 2003	1
8 November 2003	12	In Time: The Best of R.E.M. 1988–2003 (#10)	R.E.M.	1	8 November 2003	1
8 November 2003	5	Three ^{[GG]}	Sugababes	3	8 November 2003	1
8 November 2003	6	Twentysomething ♦ ^{[HH]}	Jamie Cullum	3	6 March 2004	1
15 November 2003	4	Guilty	Blue	1	15 November 2003	1
15 November 2003	1	This Left Feels Right	Bon Jovi	4	15 November 2003	1
22 November 2003	1	Try This	Pink	3	22 November 2003	1
22 November 2003	1	Ladies Night	Atomic Kitten	5	22 November 2003	1
22 November 2003	2	Bryn	Bryn Terfel	6	22 November 2003	1
22 November 2003	1	The Definitive Collection	Lionel Richie & The Commodores	10	22 November 2003	1
29 November 2003	10	Number Ones (#8)	Michael Jackson	1	29 November 2003	1
29 November 2003	7	A Present for Everyone (#9)	Busted	2	29 November 2003	1
29 November 2003	9	Greatest Hits ^{[II]}	Red Hot Chili Peppers	4	29 November 2003	1
29 November 2003	1	Body Language	Kylie Minogue	6	29 November 2003	1
29 November 2003	1	Let It Be... Naked	The Beatles	7	29 November 2003	1
6 December 2003	5	Turnaround	Westlife	1	6 December 2003	1
6 December 2003	2	Introduction	Alex Parks	5	6 December 2003	1
13 December 2003	15	Friday's Child ^{[JJ]}	Will Young	1	13 December 2003	2
13 December 2003	2	Cliff at Christmas	Cliff Richard	9	20 December 2003	1

== Entries by artist ==
The following table shows artists who achieved two or more top 10 entries in 2003, including albums that reached their peak in 2002. The figures only include main artists, with featured artists and appearances on compilation albums not counted individually for each artist. The total number of weeks an artist spent in the top ten in 2003 is also shown.

Entries	Artist	Weeks	Albums
2	Blue ^{[KK]}	7	Guilty, One Love
2	Busted	22	A Present for Everyone, Busted
2	Elvis Presley ^{[KK]}	3	ELV1S: 30 No. 1 Hits, ELVIIS: 2nd to None
2	Pink ^{[LL]}	7	Missundaztood, Try This
2	Rachel Stevens ^{[MM]}	5	Best: The Greatest Hits of S Club 7, Funky Dory
2	Red Hot Chili Peppers ^{[KK]}	20	By the Way, Greatest Hits
2	R. Kelly	10	Chocolate Factory, The R. in R&B Collection, Vol. 1
2	Robbie Williams ^{[KK]}	13	Escapology, Live at Knebworth
2	Sugababes ^{[KK]}	7	Angels with Dirty Faces, Three
2	Westlife ^{[KK]}	7	Turnaround, Unbreakable: The Greatest Hits Volume 1

== Notes ==
- ^{a} "Elephunk" reached its peak of number three on 17 January 2004 (week ending).
- ^{b} "Twentysomething" reached its peak of number three on 6 March 2004 (week ending).
- ^{c} The Eminem Show re-entered the top 10 at number 8 on 8 February 2003 (week ending).
- ^{d} Come Away with Me re-entered the top 10 at number 10 on 22 February 2003 (week ending) for 14 weeks and at number 10 on 20 September 2003 (week ending) for 2 weeks.
- ^{e} By the Way re-entered the top 10 at number 10 on 12 April 2003 (week ending) and at number 10 on 26 April 2003 (week ending).
- ^{f} Melody AM re-entered the top 10 at number 10 on 8 February 2003 (week ending).
- ^{g} A Rush of Blood to the Head re-entered the top 10 at number 6 on 1 March 2003 (week ending) for 12 weeks and at number 6 on 4 October 2003 (week ending) for 3 weeks.
- ^{h} Angels with Dirty Faces re-entered the top 10 at number 10 on 11 January 2003 (week ending) for 3 weeks and at number 10 on 15 March 2003 (week ending).
- ^{i} One By One re-entered the top 10 at number 9 on 25 January 2003 (week ending) for 2 weeks.
- ^{j} Justified re-entered the top 10 at number 8 on 18 January 2003 (week ending) for eleven weeks and at number 7 on 19 April 2003 (week ending) for twelve weeks.
- ^{k} The Greatest Hits 1970-2002 re-entered the top 10 at number 6 on 13 September 2003 (week ending) for 2 weeks and at number 8 on 22 November 2003 (week ending).
- ^{l} Escapology re-entered the top 10 at number 1 on 16 August 2003 (week ending) for 4 weeks.
- ^{m} Gotta Get Thru This re-entered the top 10 at number 9 on 26 April 2003 (week ending) for 2 weeks, at number 2 on 2 August 2003 (week ending) for 7 weeks, at number 7 on 27 September 2003 (week ending) and at number 7 on 18 October 2003 (week ending).
- ^{n} Busted re-entered the top 10 at number 7 on 26 April 2003 (week ending) for 8 weeks and at number 9 on 16 August 2003 (week ending) for 5 weeks.
- ^{o} Stripped re-entered the top 10 at number 10 on 10 May 2003 (week ending) for 6 weeks, at number 6 on 28 June 2003 (week ending) for 2 weeks, at number 9 on 13 September 2003 (week ending) and at number 9 on 10 January 2004 (week ending).
- ^{p} Their Greatest Hits - The Record originally charted at number 5 upon its initial release in 2001. It re-entered the top 10 at number 9 on 1 February 2003 (week ending) for 3 weeks.
- ^{q} Get Rich or Die Tryin' re-entered the top 10 at number 10 on 29 April 2003 (week ending) and at number 7 on 5 July 2003 (week ending) for 3 weeks.
- ^{r} Greatest Hits (Tom Jones album) re-entered the top 10 at number 8 on 5 April 2003 (week ending).
- ^{s} Fallen re-entered the top 10 at number 7 on 10 January 2004 (week ending) for 5 weeks.
- ^{t} Nu-Flow re-entered the top 10 at number 7 on 20 September 2003 (week ending).
- ^{u} The Definitive re-entered the top 10 at number 8 on 21 June 2003 (week ending) for 2 weeks.
- ^{v} You Gotta Go There to Come Back re-entered the top 10 at number 7 on 26 July 2003 (week ending) for 5 weeks.
- ^{w} Dangerously in Love re-entered the top 10 at number 10 on 13 September 2003 (week ending).
- ^{x} Innocent Eyes re-entered the top 10 at number 9 on 30 August 2003 (week ending) for 3 weeks.
- ^{y} So Much for the City re-entered the top 10 at number 6 on 20 September 2003 (week ending).
- ^{z} Permission to Land re-entered the top 10 at number 10 on 27 December 2003 (week ending) for 2 weeks and at number 5 on 28 February 2004 (week ending) for 2 weeks.
- ^{aa} Youth & Young Manhood re-entered the top 10 at number 8 on 30 August 2003 (week ending) for 2 weeks.
- ^{bb} Dutty Rock re-entered the top 10 at number 9 on 18 October 2003 (week ending).
- ^{cc} Pure re-entered the top 10 at number 7 on 22 November 2003 (week ending), at number 10 on 6 December 2003 (week ending) and at number 10 on 20 December 2003 (week ending).
- ^{dd} Elephunk re-entered the top 10 at number 8 on 6 December 2003 (week ending) for 15 weeks and at number 9 on 17 July 2004 (week ending).
- ^{ee} The Very Best of Sheryl Crow re-entered the top 10 at number 10 on 29 November 2003 (week ending).
- ^{ff} The Very Best of Cat Stevens was first released on Polygram in 1990 and peaked at number 4 in the UK. The 2003 version, which features a different cover art and tracklist than the 1990 version, was released on Universal and peaked at number 6.
- ^{gg} Three re-entered the top 10 at number 9 on 27 December 2003 (week ending) for 2 weeks and at number 10 on 17 January 2004 (week ending).
- ^{hh} Twentysomething re-entered the top 10 at number 3 on 6 March 2004 (week ending) for 4 weeks.
- ^{ii} Greatest Hits (Red Hot Chili Peppers album) re-entered the top 10 at number 10 on 31 January 2004 (week ending).
- ^{jj} Friday's Child re-entered the top 10 at number 10 on 13 March 2004 (week ending) for 6 weeks and at number 7 on 24 July 2004 (week ending).
- ^{kk} Figure includes album that peaked in 2002.
- ^{ll} Figure includes album that first charted in 2002 but peaked in 2003.
- ^{mm} Figure includes a top 10 album with the group S Club 7.

== See also ==
- 2003 in British music
- List of number-one albums from the 2000s (UK)
