= Guns Don't Kill People, Rappers Do =

Single by Goldie Lookin' Chain

from the album Greatest Hits
- Released: 16 August 2004
- Length: 3:39
- Label: Must Destroy/Atlantic Records
- Songwriter(s): Phil Chen; Rhys Hutchings; David Rowland; Martha Veléz; Mike Vernon; Pete Wingfield; Joseph Edward Wright
- Producer(s): P Xain

Goldie Lookin' Chain singles chronology
"Half Man Half Machine" (2004)	"Guns Don't Kill People, Rappers Do" (2004)	"Your Mother's Got a Penis"" (2004)

Guns Don't Kill People, Rappers Do
First 30 seconds of full version

"Guns Don't Kill People, Rappers Do" (commonly referred to as "GDKPRD") is a song by the Welsh hip hop group Goldie Lookin Chain from their Greatest Hits album. In August 2004, the song peaked at number three on the UK Singles Chart. With the tagline "The gun is the tool, the mind is the weapon", in this track the band satirised the perceived link between American hip hop and gun violence, referencing several rap murders.

== Music video ==
The video for the song features the band doing a mock police line-up and being chased on customised mobility scooters. The video is shot mostly in the town of Watford, England, featuring such local landmarks as the original 1970s concrete brutalist style shopping centre, the YMCA building and the spiral car park ramp visible from the ring road.

Actor Perry Benson plays a police officer in the video, and gives chase to the group. The video also features actor Andrew Ellis, best known as Gadget in the film This Is England.

== Charts ==
Chart (2004)	Peak position
Australia (ARIA Charts)	95
Ireland (IRMA)	23
Scotland (OCC)	4
Netherlands (Single Top 100)	92
UK Singles (OCC)	3
