= Under the Counter =

Studio album by Goldie Lookin Chain
- Released: 17 March 2008
- Genre: Hip-hop
- Length: 33:52
- Label: Shellshock
- Producer: P Xain aka Rhys From GLC

Goldie Lookin Chain chronology
Safe as Fuck (2005)	Under the Counter (2008)	Asbo4Life (2009)

Professional ratings
Review scores
Source	Rating
Rock Sound	8/10

Under the Counter is the third studio album by Welsh rap group Goldie Lookin Chain. It was released on 17 March 2008 under Shellshock Records, after the group were dropped from their previous label, Warner Music Group. It contains various demos and songs left over from the recording sessions of the previous two albums.

== Track listing ==
1. "Adam on the Phone"
2. "The Take Over"
3. "Hardcore Exchange"
4. "House Party"
5. "Eddie the Wrestler"
6. "Majic Dusty"
7. "Maggot Chant"
8. "The Nugget"
9. "Lloyd Ganja 9t9s Lament"
10. "Amsterdamage"
11. "Minimoto"
12. "Spaceman"
13. "Song for Kelly"
