= The Coral (album) =

Studio album by the Coral
- Released: 29 July 2002
- Recorded: Early 2002
- Studio: Linford Manor
- Genres: Neo-psychedelia; folk rock; garage punk
- Length: 42:47
- Label: Deltasonic
- Producers: Ian Broudie, Zion Egg (co.)

The Coral chronology
The Coral (2002)	Magic and Medicine (2003)

Singles from The Coral
- 1. "Goodbye" Released: 15 July 2002; 2. "Dreaming of You" Released: 7 October 2002

The Coral is the debut studio album by British rock band the Coral. It was released on 29 July 2002, through the Deltasonic record label. After finalising their line-up, the band had a residency at The Cavern Club, and were spotted and signed by Alan Willis of Deltasonic soon afterwards. Following the release of a single and an EP, and two UK tours, the band began recording their debut album. Sessions were held at Linford Manor Studios, Milton Keynes in early 2002, and were produced by the Lightning Seeds frontman Ian Broudie and the Coral. Described as a neo-psychedelia and folk rock album, frontman James Skelly's voice was compared to Eric Burdon of the Animals and Jim Morrison of the Doors.

The Coral toured the United Kingdom twice (one stint as a co-headliner with the Music), and supported Pulp and Oasis for a few shows, leading up to the release of The Coral's lead single "Goodbye" on 15 July 2002. Following an appearance at that year's V Festival, the band toured the UK again in October 2002 to coincide with the release of the album's second single "Dreaming of You" on 7 October 2002. The Coral was released in the United States on 4 March 2003, through Columbia Records.

The Coral received universal acclaim reviews from music critics, many of whom praised the high quality musicianship. The album peaked at number five in the UK, while also charting in France, Ireland, Japan, Scotland, and the US. It, alongside "Dreaming of You", would later be certified platinum in the UK. "Goodbye" charted at number 21 in the UK, and number 28 in Scotland, while "Dreaming of You" peaked at number 13 in the UK, and number 14 in Scotland. The album was nominated for the Mercury Music Prize, and a Brit Award.

== Background and production ==
The Coral were formed in Hoylake on the Wirral Peninsula, in 1996, between school friends Ian Skelly and Paul Duffy. Skelly practiced drums in the basement of his parents' pub while Duffy accompanied him on guitar. They auditioned various people unsuccessfully; by the time they moved to practicing in a house, Duffy switched to bass, and guitarists Bill Ryder-Jones and Lee Southall joined, both of whom attended the same school as Skelly and Duffy. Ian's brother James Skelly then joined, initially as a guitarist, though reluctantly became their frontman. The band earned a residency at a local venue, The Cavern Club, largely performing to tourists three times a day. They spent two years playing gigs and rehearsing original material, before Nick Power was brought in on keyboards. He initially planned to become a footballer but gave up on that after meeting the band sometime prior, choosing to become a musician instead. They had a rehearsal room at Crash Studios, which was owned by Peasey, who knew former Shack drummer Alan Wills.

Wills saw the Coral supporting the Real People at the Lomax venue in Liverpool; he liked the performance but thought they were lacking in quality material. He put them in contact with his friend Joe Fearon, who had had an extensive record collection, showing them the works of Can, Captain Beefheart and Kraftwerk, among others. The Coral wrote "Skeleton Key" soon afterwards, which Duffy considered a turning point for them. As no one else was interested in taking the band on, Wills became their manager. At the time, he was running the label Eva, which released dance records. He was keen to release more guitar-orientated material; as the Coral signed with him, the label name was changed to Deltasonic on 1 January 2001. At Wills' recommendation, the band stopped playing gigs to focus on writing material for their debut studio album.

"Shadows Fall" was released as a single in July 2001. Wills went to London to promote the band, igniting a bidding war between labels that resulted in Deltasonic becoming an imprint of Sony Music Entertainment. In November 2001, the band went on their first tour of the UK, which was followed by the release of The Oldest Path EP in December 2001. The Lightning Seeds frontman Ian Broudie saw the band during a show in Manchester, and wanted to work with them on their upcoming debut album. In January and February 2002, the band appeared on the NME Carling Tour in the UK, alongside Andrew W.K., Lostprophets and Black Rebel Motorcycle Club. Following the conclusion of the tour, the Coral began working on their debut album. The Coral was produced by Ian Broudie of the Lightning Seeds, and co-produced by the band (under the name Zion Egg); John Gray acted as engineer, with assistance from Kenny Paterson. The sessions occurred at Linford Manor Studios, located in Milton Keynes; it concluded by April 2002.

== Composition and lyrics ==
Musically, the sound of The Coral has been described as neo-psychedelia, folk rock, and garage punk with James Skelly's voice receiving comparisons to Eric Burdon of the Animals and Jim Morrison of the Doors. Skelly solely wrote or co-wrote the majority of the songs with Power, Duffy, Southall, Ian Skelly or Ryder-Jones; "Wildfire" is credited to Power only. The opening track, "Spanish Main", opens with the sound of feedback, evoking the sound of pirates singing on a ship during the chorus sections. The band said it was one of the last tracks made for the album, written in one rehearsal shortly prior to entering the studio. They were influenced by other songs about the sea, such as "Into the Mystic" (1970) by Van Morrison and "Ocean Rain" (1984) by Echo & the Bunnymen. The rise and drop in sound was inspired by the band's "teenage knowledge of bad dance music", citing techno and happy hardcore. "I Remember When" is done in the style of traditional Russian music, recalling the music of Nick Cave. The chord progression was taken from "What's the Difference" (1999) by Dr. Dre, and talks about an acid trip the band experienced. The middle portion of the track, as well as "Calendars and Clocks" were compared by the band to "Ennio Morricone soundtracks."

"Shadows Fall" comes across as a theme for a Spaghetti Western film, complete with four-part harmonies and a harmonica, with influence from reggae. The song's lyrics were written by Power and James Skelly under a shelter by the beachside. "Dreaming of You" features the use of a trombone and a xylophone. Ian Skelly said the song was created out of an interest in American doo-wop and Merseybeat; it was almost left off the album as the band did not want to become one-hit wonders. "Simon Diamond" is a sea shanty crossed with psychedelic rock, and tells the story of a man changing into a vegetable. The lyrics were inspired by a man named Simon Russell, who worked at a pub owned by the Skelly brothers' parents. The early Pink Floyd-indebted "Goodbye" incorporates a punk rock guitar solo echoing the Ex, and features James Skelly counting down. It was born out the band's need to have a "psych tune [...] to make the album kick a bit more", after listening to a Nuggets compilation. The vibrato guitarwork in "Waiting for the Heartaches" recalled the sound of the Zombies. The song's arrangement was taken from "Holy Ghost", an outtake that did not make the album.

"Skeleton Key" combines the guitarwork of Frank Zappa with horns and Middle Eastern music, and ends with laughter atop house music. Skelly wrote it upon listening to Trout Mask Replica (1969) by Captain Beefheart and his Magic Band for the first time. Power wanted "Wildfire" to be a track that stood out from the band's peers, referring to it as "Button Moon crossed with The Teardrop Explodes." Power came up with the song in 1998, and played it with his previous band; the Coral were impressed by the track and added Power to the lineup because of it. "Bad Man" was influenced by "old blues murder ballads" and "weird Americana", such as "Stagger Lee" (1923) by Waring's Pennsylvanians and Mutations (1998) by Beck. "Calendars and Clocks", the album's closer, is a Spanish folk track that is reminiscent of the works of the La's and Strawberry Alarm Clock, while the hidden track "Time Travel" is done in the style of the Specials. The title of "Calendars and Clocks" was take from a poem that Power had written; the music evolved out of a rendition of a Frank Sinatra song. The guitar riff in "Time Travel" was inspired by a cover of "Get Up, Stand Up" by the Wailers that the band used to play live.

== Release and promotion ==
The Skeleton Key EP was released on 1 April 2002, which featured "Skeleton Key", "Dressed Like a Cow", "Darkness", "Sheriff John Brown", and the music video for "Skeleton Key". Coinciding with the single, the band toured throughout April 2002. In June 2002, they appeared at the Isle of Wight Festival and went on a co-headlining UK tour with the Music. Following this, the Coral supported Pulp for three shows and Oasis for one show. "Goodbye" was released as a single on 15 July 2002. Two versions were released on CD in the UK: the first with "Good Fortune", "Travelling Circus", and the music video for "Goodbye", while the second included live versions of "Dressed Like a Cow" and "Goodbye". The European version included a radio edit and music video of "Goodbye", alongside "Travelling Circus" and an alternative mix of "Dressed Like a Cow". The "Goodbye" video was filmed in Wales, and includes a 30ft wicker man, taking inspiration from the film of the same name. According to Skelly, director Laurence Easeman had proposed the wicker man idea, which the band liked.

Originally scheduled for release on 22 July 2002, The Coral was eventually released a week later on 29 July 2002, through Deltasonic. The vinyl version included "Simian Technology" as a bonus track, while the Japanese edition featured "Answer Me" and "Simian Technology". The album's release was promoted with an appearance at that year's V Festival. In October 2002, the band toured across the UK; coinciding with this, "Dreaming of You" was released as a single on 7 October 2002. Two versions were released on CD in the UK: the first with "Answer Me", "Follow the Sun", and the music video for "Dreaming of You", while the second included "Sweet Sue", "Another Turn in the Lock", and an acoustic video of "Dreaming of You". The Coral was released in that territory on 4 March 2003, through Columbia Records.

The Coral was re-pressed on vinyl in 2011 and 2016, both times through the label Music on Vinyl. "Dreaming of You" and "Goodbye" were included on the band's greatest hits Singles Collection (2008) compilation. The two-CD version included demo versions of "Shadows Fall", "Calendars and Clocks" and "Dreaming of You". In 2022, the band are set to perform the album in its entirety through a UK tour, alongside a reissue that includes B-sides and two new songs ("She's the Girl for Me" and "Tumble Graves").

== Reception ==
Professional ratings
Aggregate scores
Source	Rating
Metacritic	81/100
Review scores
Source	Rating
AllMusic	3.5/5 stars
Alternative Press	4/5
Blender	3/5 stars
Entertainment Weekly	B
The Guardian	5/5 stars
NME	9/10
Pitchfork	6.8/10
Q	4/5 stars
Rolling Stone	3/5 stars
Spin	B+

The Coral was met with universal acclaim from music critics. At Metacritic, which assigns a normalized rating out of 100 to reviews from mainstream publications, the album received an average score of 81, based on 18 reviews.

The Guardian critic Alexis Petridis found the album to be a "mass of remarkable contradictions", with the band "explor[ing] 1960s rock's extremities, areas too strange for Britpop's crowd-pleasing conformity". He said it was filled with "such inexplicable pleasures [...] it sounds like a fantastic debut album by a boundless and frighteningly talented band". Entertainment Weekly writer Brian M. Raftery found the band to "defy easy categorization", while remaining constantly "engaging, making for a record that’s as hard to ignore as it is to pin down". Spin's Christian Hoard highlighted the band's use of "melody and harmony. Rich in minor-key melancholia, twangy reverb, and retro keyboards". Chris Long for BBC Manchester Music saw it as an "interesting debut. [... D]espite it's derivations and blatant robbing", the album was "original, challenging and above all, fun".

AllMusic reviewer Bryan Thomas wrote that the "fantastic voyage that is The Coral [...] is the real discovery", citing an amalgamation of various influences, often within a single song. Pitchfork contributor Chris Dahlen wrote that the band "seems more curious than inventive", tackling various ideas "but don't always have an original hook or clear idea to attach them to". John Mendelsohn of Blender said that very "[l]ittle else here [...] is quite as glorious" as "Dreaming of You". He added that there was "enough moments to suggest that, should they ever concentrate on, say, just 10 of their favorite styles, they could be fab". In a review for Rolling Stone, Robert Christgau wrote that band's "selling point is an eclecticism that evades Oasis-style overkill with compact songs that hop all over the place [... w]hether it can be imported to the U.S. is another question".

The Coral peaked at number five in the UK, number nine in Scotland, number 41 in Ireland, number 97 in Japan, number 118 in France, and number 189 on the US Billboard 200. "Goodbye" charted at number 21 in the UK, and number 28 in Scotland. "Dreaming of You" reached number 13 in the UK, and number 14 in Scotland. The Coral appeared at number 96 on the 2002 UK year-end chart, and at number 125 on the 2003 edition. The album and "Dreaming of You" were certified platinum by the British Phonographic Industry (BPI).

The Coral was nominated for the Mercury Music Prize a day after being released, and later nominated for a Brit Award. No Ripchord included the album at number 24 on their list of the 50 best albums of the year.

== Track listing ==
Writing credits per booklet.

No.	Title	Writer(s)	Length
1.	"Spanish Main"	James Skelly	1:53
2.	"I Remember When"	J. Skelly	3:38
3.	"Shadows Fall"	J. Skelly; Nick Power; Paul Duffy; Lee Southall; Ian Skelly; Bill Ryder-Jones	3:29
4.	"Dreaming of You"	J. Skelly	2:21
5.	"Simon Diamond"	J. Skelly; Nick Power	2:28
6.	"Goodbye"	J. Skelly; Power	4:02
7.	"Waiting for the Heartaches"	J. Skelly	4:03
8.	"Skeleton Key"	J. Skelly; Power	3:03
9.	"Wildfire"	Power	2:45
10.	"Bad Man"	J. Skelly; Power	3:03
11.	"Calendars and Clocks" (includes hidden track "Time Travel")	J. Skelly; Power	11:56
Total length:			42:47

== Personnel ==
Personnel per booklet.

The Coral

- James Skelly – vocals, guitar
- Lee Southall – guitar, banjo (Simon Diamond) , backing vocals
- Bill Ryder-Jones – guitar, trumpet
- Paul Duffy – bass guitar, saxophone, backing vocals
- Nick Power – keyboards, melodica, backing vocals
- Ian Skelly – drums, percussion, spoken word (Bad Man)

Production and design

- Ian Broudie – producer
- Jon Gray – engineer
- Kenny Patterson – assistant
- Zion Egg – co-producer
- Ian Skelly – sleeve illustrations
- Scott Jones – inner sleeve illustrations
- Kev Power – photography
- Juno – design
- Steve Fellowes – logo

== Charts and certifications ==
=== Weekly charts ===
Chart performance for The Coral
Chart (2002)	Peak position
French Albums (SNEP)	118
Irish Albums (IRMA)	41
Japan (Oricon)	97
Scottish Albums (Official Charts)	9
UK Albums (Official Charts)	5
US Billboard 200	189
US Heatseekers Albums (Billboard)	13

=== Year-end charts ===
Year-end chart performance for The Coral
Chart (2002)	Position
UK Albums (OCC)	96
Chart (2003)	Position
UK Albums (OCC)	125

=== Certifications ===
Certifications for The Coral
Region	Certification	Certified units/sales
United Kingdom (BPI)	Platinum	300,000^{^}
^{^} Shipments figures based on certification alone.
