= Safe as Fuck =

Studio album by Goldie Lookin Chain
- Released: 19 September 2005
- Length: 40:03
- Label: Warner Music Group
- Producer: P Xain aka Rhys From GLC

Goldie Lookin Chain chronology
Greatest Hits (2004)	Safe as Fuck (2005)	Under the Counter (2008)

Professional ratings
Review scores
Source	Rating
Drowned in Sound	(6/10)
NME	(7/10)
PlayLouder	5/5 stars
PopMatters	(7/10)

Safe as Fuck is the second studio album by Goldie Lookin Chain, released in 2005. The first single from it was "Your Missus Is a Nutter", reached number 14 in the UK charts, and the second single, "R'n'B", got to number 26. The phrase "Safe as fuck" is one of the band's catchphrases, along with "You knows it".

== Track listing ==
HIDDEN TRACK "Bedsit"

1. "Intro" - 0:10
2. "Your Missus Is a Nutter" - 4:05
3. "Bad Boy Limp" - 3:22
4. "Charmschool" - 3:12
5. "R'n'B" - 3:23
6. "HRT" - 3:36
7. "Dog" - 0:34
8. "Maggot at Midnight" - 3:31
9. "Hit Song" - 3:55
10. "Monkey Love" - 3:31
11. "Short Term" - 3:35
12. "Paranoia" - 3:49
13. "Sister" - 3:20
