= Goldie Lookin Chain =

Welsh comedic rap music group

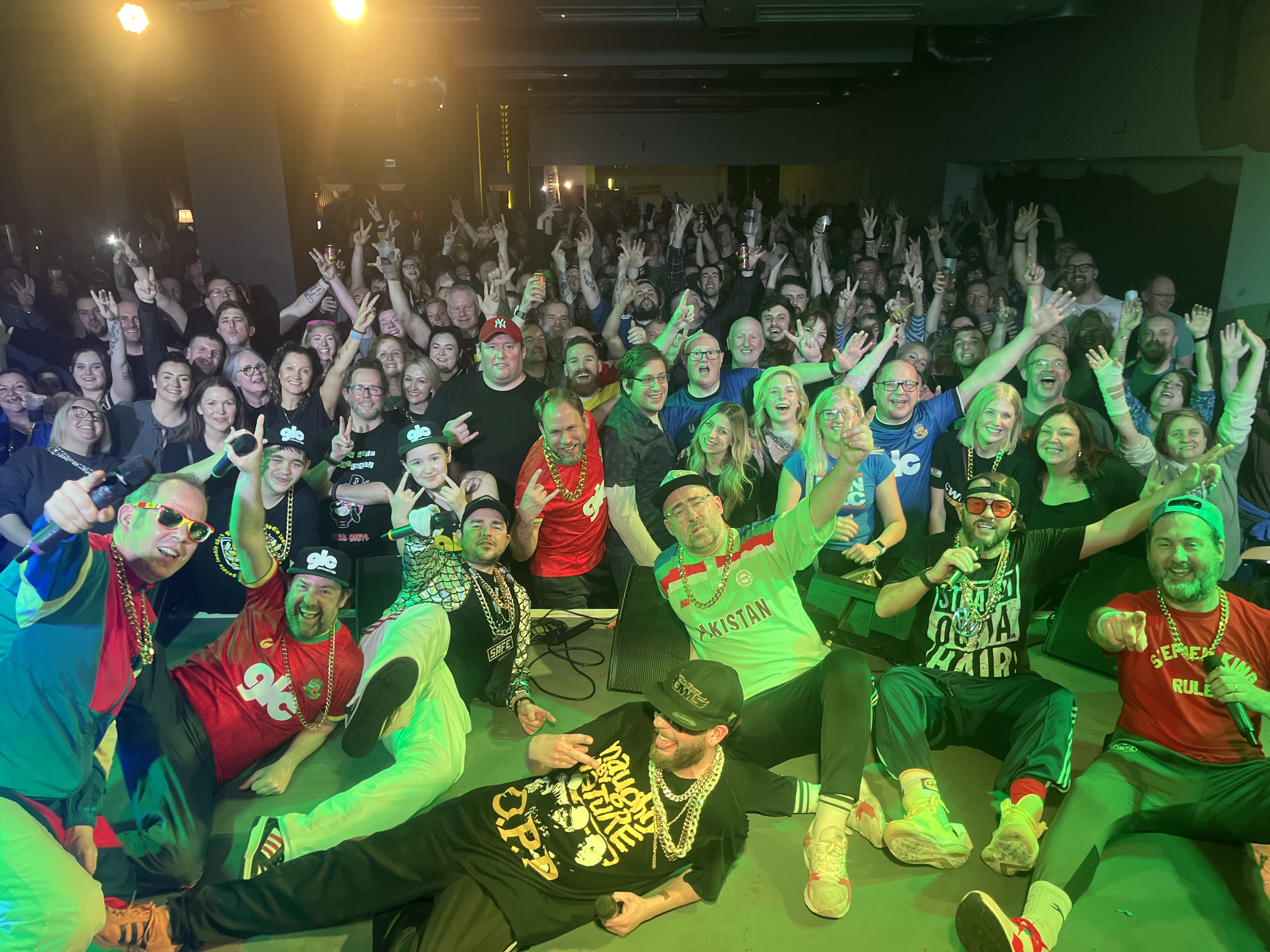
- GLC live in Newport 2024

Background information
- Origin: Newport, Wales
- Genres: Hip hop, comedy hip hop, Cool Cymru
- Years active: 2000–present
- Labels: Atlantic; Gold Dust
- Members: Rhys from GLC (Dwain Xain Zedong, P. Xain); Graham Taylor (Graham The Bear); Billy Webb (Tim Westcountry); Tom Clugston (DJ Killer Tom); John Rutledge (Eggsy); Adam Hussain; Mike Balls; Mystikal; 2Hats
- Past members: Maggot; Leeroy Fashions
- Website: www.youknowsit.co.uk

Goldie Lookin Chain are a Welsh comedy hip hop group from Newport, Wales. The group produces humorous and often explicit songs that satirise hip hop, today's consumer society, culture of Newport, and Welsh culture in general.

== History ==
The group recorded six albums prior to securing a major record deal. They signed to East West Records, the then home of rock band The Darkness. The band came to the attention of label executive Korda Marshall, who heard their music played by members of The Darkness while on tour. GLC went on to support The Darkness in the latter stages of their UK tour. The group form part of an era known as Cool Cymru for the popularity of Welsh music and arts internationally in that period.

GLC's first UK chart entry was "Half Man Half Machine", which reached the Top 40 in the UK Singles Chart. When group member Rhys Hutchings was phoned by BBC chart presenter Wes on the Official Chart Show to be informed of this, Xain informed the rest of the band they had reached number 1, much to the shock of the DJ. "Half Man Half Machine" was a surreal song about Eggsy believing he was a robot, dressing up in foil, and going to the shops to buy cigarettes and crisps. The song namechecks many well-known 1980s 8-bit computer systems, including Binatone, ZX Spectrum, Commodore 64, ZX81 and BBC Micro.

In August 2004 the group reached number three on the UK Singles Chart with "Guns Don't Kill People, Rappers Do". With the tagline "The gun is the tool, the mind is the weapon", the track became a popular radio hit, satirising the American hip hop scene. The B-side was the album track "Soapbar".

Their first nationally released album was called Greatest Hits, a play on both the group's previous lack of commercial success and their 'stoner' image; it compiled a mixture of new material and selections from their previous six unofficial albums. It was released in September 2004, and debuted at number 5 in the UK Albums Chart. The album was released in May 2005 in the US with the title Straight Outta Newport, with cover art similar to N.W.A's album Straight Outta Compton. This version of the album was missing two tracks, "Maggot" and "You Knows I Loves You".

Their next single release was "Your Mother's Got a Penis", with an accompanying video using a supermarket theme. "Your Mother's Got a Penis" first appeared on their album The Manifesto, and reached No. 14 in the UK.

The band – informally known as "the Chain" or simply "the GLC" – released "You Knows I Loves You, Baby", a parody of 1980s love songs, from the albums Greatest Hits and The Manifesto on 13 December 2004: this reached number 22 in the UK chart. "Your Missus Is a Nutter" was the first single from second album Safe as Fuck. The album was originally going to be called "Safety in Numbers", a tribute to the album Power in Numbers by alternative L.A. rap group Jurassic 5. The single reached No. 14 in the UK.

In 2005, GLC were invited by the Football Association of Wales (FAW) to perform before the World Cup qualifying match against England at Cardiff's Millennium Stadium. The band dedicated "Your Missus Is a Nutter" to David Beckham about his wife, who was present at the match. The ensuing furore, with the Welsh football authorities having to apologise to the Beckhams, as well as expressing outrage at the band's perceived lack of respect, prompted many people to question why the organisers, knowing their reputation, had hired them to play in the first place.

On 17 October 2011 GLC released the album Blue Waffle, featuring new songs, including "Biscuit", "I Seen Your Mother", "K Hole" and "If I Told You". Later that year, group member and Doctor Who fan Adam Hussain contributed a memory about "How a first date was interrupted by The Doctor" to a forthcoming Doctor Who charity book, designed to raise money for Alzheimer's Research UK.

GLC released the follow-up to their album Greatest Hits, titled Greatest Hits 2, in 2015.

In 2024 GLC played a sold-out UK tour.

GLC, Club Ifor Bach - 2003

== Sponsorship of Newport County Football Club ==
Since their inception in the early 2000s, the group have maintained a close affiliation with their home-town football club, Newport County. GLC sponsored the team's kit during the team's 2004–05 season, originally intended only for wear in matches in the FAW Premier Cup. County were drawn away to similar-colour-shirted Caernarfon Town in the competition, leading to the club's GLC sponsored shirt being worn for two league matches, away to Maidenhead United and at home against Redbridge F.C. In 2021 they designed Newport's third kit in collaboration with Hummel.

== Members ==
Full-time

- Rhys from GLC (Dwain Xain Zedong, P. Xain,Hutch)
- Graham Taylor (Graham The Bear)
- Billy Webb (Tim Westcountry)
- John Rutledge (Eggsy)
- Adam Hussain
- Mike Balls

Part-time

- Bill Frobin aka Phil I am aka I am Phil
- Tom Clugston (DJ Killer Tom)
- Mystikal
- 2Hats (Andrew David)

Infrequent members

- One Step Down
- DCI Burnside
- M. C. Meatfantasy
- Dipper Nan
- C. Live
- Rosco P.
- Ritchie Molton
- M. C. Flatpress
- Stressed Armstrong
- Farmer Ross

Former

- Andrew Major (Maggot) (left 2014)
- Leeroy Fashions

== Discography ==
=== Albums ===
- Don't Blame the Chain (2001)
- Chain's Addiction (2001)
- The Return of the Red Eye (2002)
- The Party Album (2002)
- Adam Hussain's Truth and Slander (2002)
- The Manifesto (2003)
- Greatest Hits (2004) – UK Albums Chart: No. 5
- Safe as Fuck (2005) – UK Albums Chart: No. 16
- Under the Counter (2008)
- GLC Mixtape : Now! That's What I Call Proper Music (2008)
- Asbo4Life (2009)
- Alternate Universe (2009)
- The Mix Tape Two (2010)
- It's a Goldie Lookin Christmas (The Fairytale of Newport) (2010)
- Blue Waffle (2011)
- Primordial Soup – The Mix Tape 3 (2012)
- Kings of Caerleon (2013)
- Greatest Hits 2 (2015)
- Pill Communication (2016)
- Fear of a Welsh Planet (2017)
- Safe as Fu*k (2018)
- Greatest Hits 3 (2019)
- The Adam Hussain Show (2019)
- Original Pyrite Material (2019)
- Mike Balls Boutique (2023)
- The Mix Tape 6 (2024)

=== Singles ===
==== Charted singles ====
Year	Title	UK	AUS
2004	"Half Man Half Machine"	32	-
2004	"Guns Don't Kill People, Rappers Do"	3	95
2004	"Your Mother's Got a Penis"	14	-
2004	"You Knows I Loves You"	22	-
2005	"Your Missus Is a Nutter"	14	-
2005	"R'n'B"	26	-

==== Other singles ====
- "By Any Means Necessary" (Gold Dust Records)
- "Everybody is a DJ" (Gold Dust Records)
- "You'll Never Be Alone on Christmas Day" (Gold Dust Records)

=== YouTube videos ===
- "Apathy" (26 August 2008)
- "By Any Means Necessary" (16 February 2009)
- "Everybody is a DJ" (11 August 2009)
- "Newport State of Mind (You're not from Newport)" (8 August 2010)
- "(Heal the World) Join Hands and Sing" (1 October 2010)
- "Dubstep Christmas" (23 November 2010)
- "You'll Never Be Alone on Christmas Day" (19 November 2010)
- "Xbox Love" (25 February 2011)
- "Eastenders Rap" (19 March 2011)
- "Fresh Prince of Cwmbran" (12 July 2011)
- "Ghost Town featuring 2Rude" (12 August 2011)
- "This Town (Stammer dubstep remix)" (22 September 2011)
- "Newport Bouncers Rap" (11 February 2012)
- "Baneswell Express" (17 June 2013)
- "At The Drive-thru" (18 July 2013)
- "Just Coz It Rhymes" (30 October 2013)
- "Andy Townsend Rap" (11 June 2014)
- "Great British Bake Off Rap" (5 August 2015)
- "John Lewis Christmas ft Oasis" (6 December 2015)
- "Who's Next" (13 January 2016)
- "Drop It Like Its Splott" (19 February 2016)
- "Pusherman" (3 April 2016)
- "Waitrose Rap" (5 April 2016)
- "Just Another Bastard" (11 April 2016)
- "Hip Hop Has Been Good To Me" (14 April 2016)
- "Auf Wiedersehen Mate" (25 April 2016)
- "Wales Now It's Time To Dream" (6 July 2016)
- "Sh*t 2016" (30 December 2016)
- "My Fidget Spinner" (7 June 2017)
- "Bonk Eye" (8 September 2017)
- "I Got a Van" (22 September 2017)
- "Fear of a Welsh Planet" (2017)
- "I love Netflix" (2017)
- "Sex People" (2017)
- "This One Goes Out To The Ravers" (2017)
- "South Mimms" (2017)
- "Wales Unofficial Soccer Anthem" (2018)
- "Paul" (2018)
- "Andrew Biggy Morris AKA ABM" (2019)
- "Skin Tight" (2019)
- "Which One Of You Is From Cwmbran" (2019)
- "Adequate" (2019)
- "Jammy Time" (2019)
- "Self Isolation Rap" (2019)
- "Covid Christmas" (2020)
- "Wellend (a GLC shanty)" (2020)
- "Football Football Football" (2022)
- "Mike Adidas" (2023)
- "Mike Balls is dead" (2023)
- "Is It Wetherspoons" (2023)
- "10p For A Sauce" (2023)
- "Dryrobe Rap" (2024)
- "Bald Rap" (2024)
- "I Love Drinking" (2024)
- "Pink Wine" (2024)
- "Lions Mane" (2024)
- "The Middle of Lidl" (2024)
- "Full Kit" (2024)
- "Turkey Teeth" (2025)
- "Dry Jan" (2026)
