= ...Allow Us to Be Frank =

Studio album by Westlife
- Released: 8 November 2004
- Recorded: 2004
- Studios: Rokstone Studios (London)
- Genre: Big band
- Length: 39:21
- Labels: Sony BMG, RCA
- Producer: Steve Mac

Westlife chronology
| Turnaround (2003) | ...Allow Us to Be Frank (2004) | Face to Face (2005) |

Singles from ...Allow Us to Be Frank
- 1. "Smile" Released: 4 November 2004; 2. "Fly Me to the Moon" Released: 20 December 2004; 3. "Ain't That a Kick in the Head" Released: 6 January 2005

Professional ratings
Review scores
| Source | Rating |
|---|---|
| Entertainment.ie | 2/5 stars |
| MTV Asia | (4/10) |
| RTÉ.ie | 4/5 stars |
| Rovi | 2/5 stars |
| Stylus Magazine | F |
| Yahoo! Music UK | 3/10 |

...Allow Us to Be Frank, a Rat Pack tribute, is the fifth studio album, sixth major album release under Sony BMG and first cover album by Irish boy band Westlife; it is also their first album as a four-piece following the departure of Brian McFadden. It was released on 8 November 2004, and peaked at number two in Ireland and number three in the United Kingdom. ...Allow Us to Be Frank was number twenty-four on the 2004 year-end album charts. The album features songs made popular by Frank Sinatra such as "The Way You Look Tonight", "Come Fly with Me", "Moon River", "Summer Wind" and "That's Life". It also includes the Nat "King" Cole song, "When I Fall in Love". It was recorded with a 60-piece orchestra at Phoenix Studios in Wembley, in the London Borough of Brent.

== Singles ==
"Smile" was released as the album's first single on 4 November 2004. The physical single features the video and B-sides "White Christmas" and "When I Fall in Love". It charted at number 37 in Sweden.

"Fly Me to the Moon" was released as the album's second single on 20 December 2004. The single was only released digitally, featuring the video, as well as an exclusive B-side, "Beyond the Sea", which does not feature on the album.

"Ain't That a Kick in the Head" was released as the album's third and final single on 6 January 2005. The physical single features the video, as well B-side "Moon River". It peaked at number 5 in Denmark, number 20 in Sweden, number 41 in the Netherlands and number 43 in Europe. While "Moon River" charted at No. 221 in Russia.

== Track listing ==
| No. | Title | Writer(s) | Length |
|---|---|---|---|
| 1. | "Ain't That a Kick in the Head" | Sammy Cahn, Jimmy Van Heusen | 2:27 |
| 2. | "Fly Me to the Moon" | Bart Howard | 2:31 |
| 3. | "Smile" | Charles Chaplin, Geoffrey Parsons, John Turner | 2:50 |
| 4. | "Let There Be Love" | Ian Grant, Lionel Rand | 2:45 |
| 5. | "The Way You Look Tonight" (with Joanne Hindley) | Jerome Kern, Dorothy Fields | 4:07 |
| 6. | "Come Fly with Me" | Cahn, Van Heusen | 3:15 |
| 7. | "Mack the Knife" | Marc Blitzstein, Bertolt Brecht, Kurt Weill | 3:10 |
| 8. | "I Left My Heart in San Francisco" | George Cory, Douglas Cross | 2:59 |
| 9. | "Summer Wind" | Hans Bradtke, Henry Mayer, Johnny Mercer | 2:58 |
| 10. | "Clementine" | Woody Harris, Percy Montrose | 3:19 |
| 11. | "When I Fall in Love" | Edward Heyman, Victor Young | 3:09 |
| 12. | "Moon River" | Mercer, Henry Mancini | 2:40 |
| 13. | "That's Life" | Kelly Gordon, Dean Kay | 3:13 |

Japanese bonus tracks
| No. | Title | Writer(s) | Length |
|---|---|---|---|
| 14. | "The Way You Look Tonight" (Westlife-only version) | Kern, Fields | 3:45 |
| 15. | "Ain't That a Kick in the Head" (video) | Cahn, Van Heusen | 2:30 |

On the Japanese edition, the song The Way You Look Tonight is in two versions: the Westlife version is track 5, and the duet with Joanne Hindley is bonus track 14.

== Personnel ==
Band recorded at Whitfield Street Studios, London. Vocals recorded at Rokstone Studios, London.

- Joanne Hindley — vocals (5)
- Katie Kissoon and Tessa Niles — female backing vocals (13)
- Andy Caine and Steve Mac — background vocal arrangements
- Stylorouge — design and art direction
- John Parricelli and Mitch Dalton — guitars
- Allan Walley and Leon Bosch — bass
- Steve Pearce - bass guitar
- Ralph Salmins - drums
- Gary Kettel and Glynn Matthews — percussion
- Dave Arch — piano and arrangement
- Dave Lee, Jim Rattigan, Paul Gardham, and Richard Watkins — horns
- Andy Greenwood, Derek Watkins, Simon Gardner, and Steve Sidwell — trumpets
- Chris Dean, Mark Nightingale, and Pete Beachill — tenor trombones
- Richard Edward — bass trombone
- Andy Macintosh and Phil Todd — alto saxophone and flute
- Andy Panayi and Dave Bishop — tenor saxophone and flute
  - Andy Panayi — clarinet
- Alan Barnes — baritone saxophone, bass clarinet, flute
- Strings:
  - David Angel, Debbie Widdup, Douglas MacKie, Gillian Cohen, Marcus Barcham-Stevens, Martin Burgess, Michael McMenemy, Paul Manley, Perry Montague-Mason, Peter Oxer, Ralph De Souze, Rebecca Hirsch, Roger Garland, Simon Baggs, Steve Morris, and Wilf Gibson — violins
  - Andy Parker, Edward Vanderspar, Garfield Jackson, Kathy Burgess, Nick Barr, and Vicci Wardman — violas
  - Cathy Giles, Gillian Thoday, Martin Loveday, and Nick Cooper - cellos
  - Paul Morgan — double bass

=== Credits ===
- Mike Ross-Trevor — band recording
- Chris Laws — vocal recording and Pro Tools engineer
- Daniel Pursey — vocal recording and mix assistant engineer
- Steve Mac — vocal recording
- Ren Swan — mix engineer
- Devin Workman and Ren Swan — Pro Tools engineers
- Dick Beetham — mastering
- James Bareham — percussion

== Charts ==
=== Weekly charts ===
| Chart (2004–05) | Peak position |
|---|---|
| Belgian Albums (Ultratop Flanders) | 25 |
| Danish Albums (Tracklisten) | 15 |
| Dutch Albums (MegaCharts) | 32 |
| European Albums Chart | 6 |
| German Albums (Media Control Charts) | 30 |
| Irish Albums (IRMA) | 2 |
| Japanese Albums (Oricon) | 67 |
| Scottish Albums (OCC) | 3 |
| Singaporean Albums (RIAS) | 4 |
| Swedish Albums (Sverigetopplistan) | 5 |
| Swiss Albums (Swiss Hitparade) | 75 |
| Taiwanese Albums (G-Music) | 5 |
| UK Albums (OCC) | 3 |

=== Year-end charts ===
| Chart (2004) | Position |
|---|---|
| Swedish Albums (Sverigetopplistan) | 87 |
| UK Albums (OCC) | 24 |

== Certifications and sales ==
| Region | Certification | Certified units/sales |
|---|---|---|
| United Kingdom (BPI) | 2× Platinum | 653,405 |

== Release history ==
| Region | Date |
|---|---|
| Europe | 8 November 2004 |
| Philippines | 13 November 2004 |
| Japan | 24 November 2004 |
| Taiwan | 3 December 2004 |
