= Greatest Hits (Goldie Lookin Chain album) =

Studio album by Goldie Lookin Chain
- Released: September 13, 2004 (UK); May 10, 2005 (U.S.)
- Genre: Hip hop
- Length: 38.01
- Label: Atlantic
- Producer: P Xain aka Rhys From GLC

Goldie Lookin Chain chronology
Greatest Hits (2004)	Safe as Fuck (2005)

Alternative Cover
- U.S. Album Cover

Professional ratings
Review scores
Source	Rating
Allmusic	3/5 stars

Greatest Hits was the first Goldie Lookin Chain album to be released nationally and on a major label (Atlantic Records). It was released in 2004 and took tracks from several of Goldie Lookin Chain's previous, self-released CD-R albums which had been given out and copied extensively.

The album was renamed Straight Outta Newport for its release in the U.S. on May 10, 2005, although it failed to make the Billboard 200 there.

== Track listing ==
1. "The Manifesto" – 1:10
2. "Self Suicide" – 3:45
3. "Guns Don't Kill People Rappers Do" – 3:36
4. "Half Man Half Machine" – 3:40
5. "Roller Disco" – 3:07
6. "Soap Bar" – 4:10
7. "Billy Webb's Lament" – 0:42
8. "Your Mother's Got a Penis" – 2:29
9. "The Maggot" – 3:03
10. "You Knows I Loves You" – 4:24
11. "Leeroy Fashions' Lament" – 0:49
12. "21 Ounces" – 3:13
13. "Time to Make a Change" – 3:47
14. "Holiday" (hidden track: accessible by re-winding from the beginning of Track 1)
