= List of UK top-ten albums in 2021 =

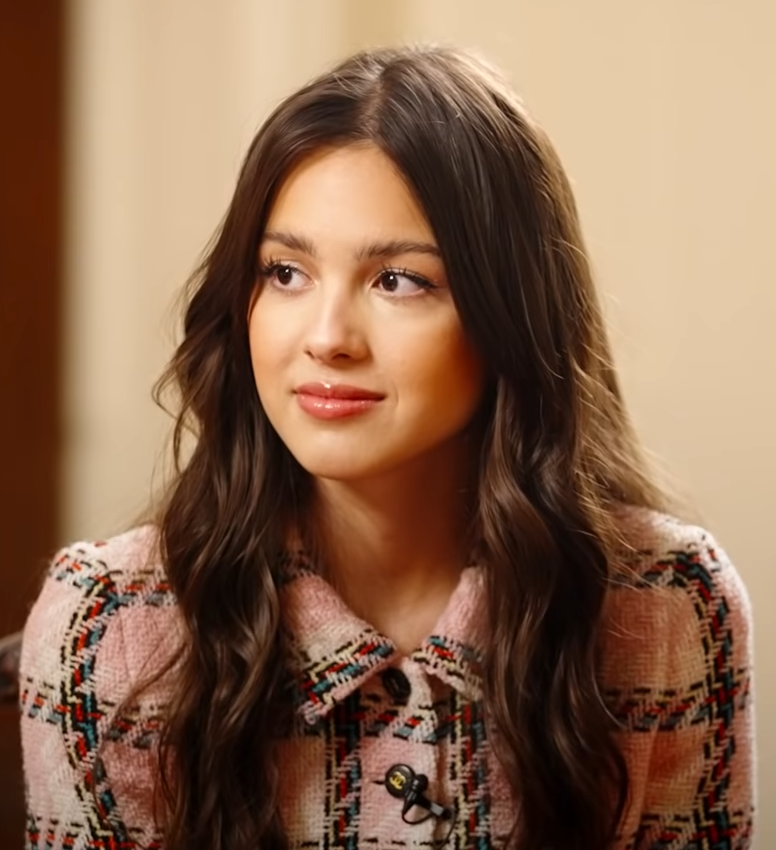
American singer and actress Olivia Rodrigo made history in 2021 when she became the youngest solo artist to achieve the coveted UK chart double after her single "Good 4 U" climbed to number-one in the UK Singles Chart the same week her debut album Sour entered the UK Albums Chart at number-one.

The UK Albums Chart is one of many music charts compiled by the Official Charts Company that calculates the best-selling albums of the week in the United Kingdom. Since 2004 the chart has been based on the sales of both physical albums and digital downloads. Since 2015, the album chart has been based on both sales and streaming. This list shows albums that peaked in the top ten of the UK Albums Chart during 2021, as well as albums which peaked in 2020 and 2022 but were in the top 10 in 2021. The entry date is when the album appeared in the top 10 for the first time (week ending, as published by the Official Charts Company, which is six days after the chart is announced).

Two-hundred and eighteen albums were in the top ten this year. Two albums from 2019 and thirteen albums from 2020 remained in the top ten for several weeks at the beginning of the year, while Between Us by Little Mix was released in 2021, but did not reach its peak until 2022. Little Mix sixth studio album Confetti, was also the fastest-selling album of 2020 by a British act. Fine Line by Harry Styles debuted in 2019 and re-entered the top 10 in 2020, but its peak position was not until 2021. Christmas by Michael Bublé was originally released in 2011, launched a new chart run in 2020, reaching a peak on its latest run in 2021, when it returned to number-one. Post Human: Survival Horror by Bring Me the Horizon was the only album from 2020 to reach its peak in 2021. Olivia Rodrigo, Celeste and Arlo Parks were among the many artists who achieved their first top 10 album in 2021.

The first new number-one album of the year was Greenfields: The Gibb Brothers Songbook, Vol. 1 by Barry Gibb. Overall, forty different albums peaked at number-one in 2021, with Taylor Swift (2) having the most albums hit that position. An asterisk (*) in the "Weeks in Top 10" column shows that the album is currently in the top 10.

== Background ==
=== Tom Jones becomes the oldest living male artist to achieve a UK number-one album ===
Welsh singer Tom Jones made UK chart history this year when, at 80 years and 10 months old, he became the oldest living male artist to achieve a number-one album in the UK Albums Chart with his 41st studio album Surrounded by Time. The album entered the chart at the top spot on 30 April 2021 (6 May 2021, week ending), giving Jones his fourth number-one album in the United Kingdom and his first in that country since 1999's Reload.

=== Olivia Rodrigo becomes youngest solo artist to score UK chart double ===
On 28 May 2021 (3 June 2021, week ending), American singer Olivia Rodrigo became the youngest solo artist to achieve the coveted UK chart double at 18 years and 3 months old. Her single "Good 4 U" climbed to number-one in the UK Singles Chart after debuting at number two the previous week, while her debut album Sour entered the UK Albums Chart at number-one. Rodrigo became the first artist since Sam Smith in 2015 to garner a UK chart double with a debut album.

=== Chart debuts ===
The following table (collapsed on desktop site) does not include acts who had previously charted as part of a group and secured their first top 10 solo album.

Artist	Number of top 10s	First entry	Chart position	Other entries
The Kid Laroi	1	F*ck Love	6	—
Why Don't We	1	The Good Times and the Bad Ones	5	—
Shame	1	Drunk Tank Pink	8	—
Bicep	1	Isles	2	—
Poor Clares of Arundel	1	Light for the World	5	—
Celeste	1	Not Your Muse	1	—
Arlo Parks	1	Collapsed in Sunbeams	3	—
Black Country, New Road	1	For the First Time	4	—
Ghetts	1	Conflict of Interest	2	—
Architects	1	For Those That Wish to Exist	1	—
Digga D	1	Made in the Pyrex	3	—
Central Cee	1	Wild West	2	—
RJ Thompson	1	Lifeline	5	—
Black Honey	1	Written & Directed	7	—
Floating Points	1	Promises	6	—
Pharoah Sanders	1	Promises	6	—
The Snuts	1	W.L.	1	—
Dry Cleaning	1	New Long Leg	4	—
Lil Tjay	1	Destined 2 Win	7	—
Greta Van Fleet	1	The Battle at Garden's Gate	8	—
Gojira	1	Fortitude	6	—
Girl in Red	1	If I Could Make It Go Quiet	7	—
Squid	1	Bright Green Field	4	—
Olivia Rodrigo	1	Sour	1	—
Lil Durk	1	The Voice of the Heroes	5	—
Bo Burnham	1	Inside (The Songs)	5	—
Griff	1	One Foot in Front of the Other	4	—
Doja Cat	1	Planet Her	3	—
Inhaler	1	It Won't Always Be Like This	1	—
Unknown T	1	Adolescence	8	—
Kurupt FM	1	The Greatest Hits (Part 1)	8	—
Orla Gartland	1	Woman on the Internet	10	—
Maisie Peters	1	You Signed Up for This	2	—
Becky Hill	1	Only Honest on the Weekend	7	—
Little Simz	1	Sometimes I Might Be Introvert	4	—
Lil Nas X	1	Montero	2	—
Tion Wayne	1	Green with Envy	5	—
M1llionz	1	Provisional License	10	—
The Lathums	1	How Beautiful Life Can Be	1	—
Joy Crookes	1	Skin	5	—
Mimi Webb	1	Seven Shades of Heartbreak	9	—
Silk Sonic	1	An Evening with Silk Sonic	9	—

=== Best-selling albums ===
Adele had the best-selling album of the year with 30. = by Ed Sheeran came in second place. ABBA's Voyage, Sour by Olivia Rodrigo and Queen's Greatest Hits made up the top five. Albums by Dua Lipa, Ed Sheeran (÷), Elton John, Fleetwood Mac and Dave were also in the top ten best-selling albums of the year.

== Top-ten albums ==
Key

Symbol	Meaning
‡	Album peaked in 2019 or 2020 but still in chart in 2021.
♦	Album released in 2021 but peaked in 2022.
(#)	Year-end top ten album position and rank
Entered	The date that the album first appeared in the chart.
Peak	Highest position that the song reached in the UK Albums Chart.

Entered (week ending)	Weeks in top 10	Album	Artist	Peak	Peak reached (week ending)	Weeks at peak
Albums in 2019
30 May 2019	85	Divinely Uninspired to a Hellish Extent ‡	Lewis Capaldi	1	30 May 2019	10
26 December 2019	57	Fine Line	Harry Styles	2	14 January 2021	1
Albums in 2020
30 January 2020	11	Music to be Murdered By ‡	Eminem	1	30 January 2020	1
9 April 2020	51	Future Nostalgia ‡ (#6)	Dua Lipa	1	16 April 2020	4
9 July 2020	3	What's Your Pleasure? ‡	Jessie Ware	3	9 July 2020	1
16 July 2020	34	Shoot for the Stars, Aim for the Moon ‡	Pop Smoke	1	1 October 2020	1
12 November 2020	5	Positions ‡	Ariana Grande	1	12 November 2020	1
12 November 2020	4	Love Goes ‡	Sam Smith	2	12 November 2020	1
12 November 2020	2	Post Human: Survival Horror	Bring Me the Horizon	1	4 February 2021	1
19 November 2020	5	Disco ‡	Kylie Minogue	1	19 November 2020	1
19 November 2020	11	Confetti ‡	Little Mix	2	19 November 2020	1
3 December 2020	5	Classic Diamonds ‡	Neil Diamond & the London Symphony Orchestra	2	24 December 2020	1
10 December 2020	10	Christmas	Michael Bublé	1	7 January 2021	1
17 December 2020	2	Weird! ‡	Yungblud	1	17 December 2020	1
24 December 2020	9	Evermore ‡	Taylor Swift	1	24 December 2020	2
Albums in 2021
7 January 2021	22	Greatest Hits (#5)	Queen	2	15 July 2021	1
14 January 2021	4	F*ck Love	The Kid Laroi	6	5 August 2021	1
21 January 2021	3	Greenfields: The Gibb Brothers Songbook, Vol. 1	Barry Gibb	1	21 January 2021	1
21 January 2021	1	Songs for the Drunk and Broken Hearted	Passenger	2	21 January 2021	1
28 January 2021	1	Suckapunch	You Me at Six	1	28 January 2021	1
28 January 2021	1	Spare Ribs	Sleaford Mods	4	28 January 2021	1
28 January 2021	1	The Good Times and the Bad Ones	Why Don't We	5	28 January 2021	1
28 January 2021	1	Drunk Tank Pink	Shame	8	28 January 2021	1
4 February 2021	1	Isles	Bicep	2	4 February 2021	1
4 February 2021	1	Light for the World	Poor Clares of Arundel	5	4 February 2021	1
11 February 2021	3	Not Your Muse	Celeste	1	11 February 2021	1
11 February 2021	2	Money Can't Buy Happiness	Fredo	2	11 February 2021	1
11 February 2021	1	Collapsed in Sunbeams	Arlo Parks	3	11 February 2021	1
11 February 2021	1	The Future Bites	Steven Wilson	4	11 February 2021	1
11 February 2021	1	Snakes & Ladders	Chip	7	11 February 2021	1
18 February 2021	3	Medicine at Midnight	Foo Fighters	1	18 February 2021	1
18 February 2021	212*	The Highlights	The Weeknd	2	18 February 2021	7
18 February 2021	1	For the First Time	Black Country, New Road	4	18 February 2021	1
18 February 2021	1	Shore	Fleet Foxes	5	18 February 2021	1
25 February 2021	1	Tyron	Slowthai	1	25 February 2021	1
25 February 2021	1	Who Am I?	Pale Waves	3	25 February 2021	1
25 February 2021	1	Death by Rock and Roll	The Pretty Reckless	6	25 February 2021	1
4 March 2021	1	As the Love Continues	Mogwai	1	4 March 2021	1
4 March 2021	1	Conflict of Interest	Ghetts	2	4 March 2021	1
11 March 2021	1	For Those That Wish to Exist	Architects	1	11 March 2021	1
11 March 2021	1	Nature Always Wins	Maxïmo Park	2	11 March 2021	1
11 March 2021	2	Made in the Pyrex	Digga D	3	11 March 2021	2
11 March 2021	1	Detroit Stories	Alice Cooper	4	11 March 2021	1
11 March 2021	1	Choices	Lucy Spraggan	5	11 March 2021	1
18 March 2021	2	When You See Yourself	Kings of Leon	1	18 March 2021	1
18 March 2021	1	Do It Again	Gabrielle	4	18 March 2021	1
18 March 2021	10	÷ (#7)	Ed Sheeran	7	8 July 2021	2
25 March 2021	1	Evering Road	Tom Grennan	1	25 March 2021	1
25 March 2021	5	Wild West	Central Cee	2	25 March 2021	1
25 March 2021	1	All the Right Noises	Thunder	3	25 March 2021	1
25 March 2021	1	Lifeline	RJ Thompson	5	25 March 2021	1
1 April 2021	1	Chemtrails over the Country Club	Lana Del Rey	1	1 April 2021	1
1 April 2021	7	Justice	Justin Bieber	2	1 April 2021	3
1 April 2021	1	Written & Directed	Black Honey	7	1 April 2021	1
8 April 2021	1	Collections from the Whiteout	Ben Howard	1	8 April 2021	1
8 April 2021	1	The Bitter Truth	Evanescence	4	8 April 2021	1
8 April 2021	1	Promises	Floating Points, Pharoah Sanders & the London Symphony Orchestra	6	8 April 2021	1
15 April 2021	1	W.L.	The Snuts	1	15 April 2021	1
15 April 2021	1	Dancing with the Devil... the Art of Starting Over	Demi Lovato	2	15 April 2021	1
15 April 2021	1	New Long Leg	Dry Cleaning	4	15 April 2021	1
15 April 2021	9	50 Years – Don't Stop (#9)	Fleetwood Mac	6	15 April 2021	2
15 April 2021	1	Destined 2 Win	Lil Tjay	7	15 April 2021	1
15 April 2021	1	Rumours	Fleetwood Mac	8	15 April 2021	1
22 April 2021	3	Fearless (Taylor's Version)	Taylor Swift	1	22 April 2021	1
29 April 2021	2	Californian Soil	London Grammar	1	29 April 2021	1
29 April 2021	2	Flu Game	AJ Tracey	2	29 April 2021	1
29 April 2021	1	Let the Bad Times Roll	The Offspring	3	29 April 2021	1
29 April 2021	1	11 Past the Hour	Imelda May	6	29 April 2021	1
29 April 2021	1	The Battle at Garden's Gate	Greta Van Fleet	8	29 April 2021	1
6 May 2021	2	Surrounded by Time	Tom Jones	1	6 May 2021	1
13 May 2021	2	Typhoons	Royal Blood	1	13 May 2021	1
13 May 2021	1	Coral Island	The Coral	2	13 May 2021	1
13 May 2021	1	Celebrate the Music of Peter Green and the Early Years of Fleetwood Mac	Mick Fleetwood & Friends	3	13 May 2021	1
13 May 2021	1	Young Heart	Birdy	4	13 May 2021	1
13 May 2021	1	Fortitude	Gojira	6	13 May 2021	1
13 May 2021	1	If I Could Make It Go Quiet	Girl in Red	7	13 May 2021	1
13 May 2021	1	Live At Knebworth 1990	Pink Floyd	8	13 May 2021	1
13 May 2021	1	Khaled Khaled	DJ Khaled	10	13 May 2021	1
20 May 2021	7	Life by Misadventure	Rag'n'Bone Man	1	20 May 2021	1
20 May 2021	2	We Are More Than One	Michael Ball	2	20 May 2021	1
20 May 2021	1	Build a Problem	Dodie	3	20 May 2021	1
20 May 2021	1	Bright Green Field	Squid	4	20 May 2021	1
20 May 2021	1	Latest Record Project, Volume 1	Van Morrison	5	20 May 2021	1
20 May 2021	6	Diamonds (#8)	Elton John	8	20 May 2021	2
27 May 2021	1	Fat Pop (Volume 1)	Paul Weller	1	27 May 2021	1
27 May 2021	2	The Off-Season	J. Cole	2	27 May 2021	1
27 May 2021	1	Daddy's Home	St. Vincent	4	27 May 2021	1
27 May 2021	1	Delta Kream	The Black Keys	5	27 May 2021	1
27 May 2021	1	Be Right Back (EP)	Jorja Smith	9	27 May 2021	1
3 June 2021	54	Sour (#4)	Olivia Rodrigo	1	3 June 2021	5
3 June 2021	1	Intruder	Gary Numan	2	3 June 2021	1
3 June 2021	1	Scaled and Icy	Twenty One Pilots	3	3 June 2021	1
3 June 2021	1	All I Know So Far: Setlist	Pink	4	3 June 2021	1
3 June 2021	1	Loveless	My Bloody Valentine	7	3 June 2021	1
3 June 2021	1	Seeking New Gods	Gruff Rhys	10	3 June 2021	1
10 June 2021	1	Life's a Beach	Easy Life	2	10 June 2021	1
10 June 2021	1	Hi	Texas	3	10 June 2021	1
10 June 2021	1	Fatal Mistakes	Del Amitri	5	10 June 2021	1
10 June 2021	1	The Resurrection	Bugzy Malone	7	10 June 2021	1
17 June 2021	2	Blue Weekend	Wolf Alice	1	17 June 2021	1
17 June 2021	1	All the Colours of You	James	3	17 June 2021	1
17 June 2021	1	The Voice of the Heroes	Lil Baby & Lil Durk	5	17 June 2021	1
17 June 2021	1	Dreamers Are Waiting	Crowded House	6	17 June 2021	1
24 June 2021	3	Back the Way We Came: Vol. 1 (2011–2021)	Noel Gallagher's High Flying Birds	1	24 June 2021	1
24 June 2021	2	Hall of Fame	Polo G	3	24 June 2021	1
24 June 2021	1	No Gods No Masters	Garbage	5	24 June 2021	1
24 June 2021	7	Inside (The Songs)	Bo Burnham	5	15 July 2021	1
24 June 2021	1	Culture III	Migos	9	24 June 2021	1
1 July 2021	1	Carnage	Nick Cave & Warren Ellis	3	1 July 2021	1
1 July 2021	1	One Foot in Front of the Other	Griff	4	1 July 2021	1
1 July 2021	1	Consequences	Joan Armatrading	10	1 July 2021	1
8 July 2021	2	Europiana	Jack Savoretti	1	8 July 2021	1
8 July 2021	15	Planet Her	Doja Cat	3	8 July 2021	2
8 July 2021	1	Call Me If You Get Lost	Tyler, the Creator	4	8 July 2021	1
8 July 2021	1	Boy from Michigan	John Grant	8	8 July 2021	1
22 July 2021	1	It Won't Always Be Like This	Inhaler	1	22 July 2021	1
22 July 2021	1	Monsters	Tom Odell	4	22 July 2021	1
22 July 2021	1	Origin of Symmetry	Muse	6	22 July 2021	1
29 July 2021	5	All Over the Place	KSI	1	29 July 2021	1
29 July 2021	1	Faith	Pop Smoke	3	29 July 2021	1
29 July 2021	1	Sob Rock	John Mayer	4	29 July 2021	1
5 August 2021	14	We're All Alone in This Together (#10)	Dave	1	5 August 2021	2
5 August 2021	3	Therapy	Anne-Marie	2	5 August 2021	1
5 August 2021	1	Back to Black	Amy Winehouse	7	5 August 2021	1
12 August 2021	6	Happier Than Ever	Billie Eilish	1	12 August 2021	1
12 August 2021	1	Welcome 2 America	Prince	5	12 August 2021	1
12 August 2021	1	Adolescence	Unknown T	8	12 August 2021	1
19 August 2021	1	Crying on the Bathroom Floor	Will Young	3	19 August 2021	1
19 August 2021	1	Release Me 2	Barbra Streisand	5	19 August 2021	1
19 August 2021	1	All Things Must Pass	George Harrison	6	19 August 2021	1
19 August 2021	1	Back to the Light	Brian May	7	19 August 2021	1
19 August 2021	1	Independence Day	Fredo	9	19 August 2021	1
26 August 2021	1	Pressure Machine	The Killers	1	26 August 2021	1
26 August 2021	1	Loving in Stereo	Jungle	3	26 August 2021	1
2 September 2021	1	Solar Power	Lorde	2	2 September 2021	1
2 September 2021	1	Saturday Night, Sunday Morning	Jake Bugg	3	2 September 2021	1
2 September 2021	1	The Greatest Hits (Part 1)	Kurupt FM	8	2 September 2021	1
2 September 2021	1	Woman on the Internet	Orla Gartland	10	2 September 2021	1
9 September 2021	2	Donda	Kanye West	1	9 September 2021	1
9 September 2021	1	You Signed Up for This	Maisie Peters	2	9 September 2021	1
9 September 2021	1	Screen Violence	Chvrches	4	9 September 2021	1
9 September 2021	1	If I Can't Have Love, I Want Power	Halsey	5	9 September 2021	1
9 September 2021	3	Only Honest on the Weekend	Becky Hill	7	9 September 2021	2
16 September 2021	9	Certified Lover Boy	Drake	1	16 September 2021	2
16 September 2021	2	Senjutsu	Iron Maiden	2	16 September 2021	1
16 September 2021	1	Sometimes I Might Be Introvert	Little Simz	4	16 September 2021	1
16 September 2021	4	ABBA Gold: Greatest Hits	ABBA	5	16 September 2021	1
16 September 2021	1	Mercury – Act 1	Imagine Dragons	7	16 September 2021	1
16 September 2021	1	21st Century Love Songs	The Wildhearts	9	16 September 2021	1
23 September 2021	1	The Ultra Vivid Lament	Manic Street Preachers	1	23 September 2021	1
23 September 2021	1	What the Future Holds Pt. 2	Steps	2	23 September 2021	1
23 September 2021	1	Dark Matters	The Stranglers	4	23 September 2021	1
23 September 2021	1	Back in Love City	The Vaccines	5	23 September 2021	1
23 September 2021	1	Metallica: 30th Anniversary Edition	Metallica	8	23 September 2021	1
23 September 2021	1	Star-Crossed	Kacey Musgraves	10	23 September 2021	1
30 September 2021	3	Montero	Lil Nas X	2	30 September 2021	1
30 September 2021	1	Green with Envy	Tion Wayne	5	30 September 2021	1
30 September 2021	1	The Bootleg Series Vol. 16: Springtime in New York 1980–1985	Bob Dylan	6	30 September 2021	1
30 September 2021	1	The Last Domino? – The Hits	Genesis	9	30 September 2021	1
30 September 2021	1	Provisional License	M1llionz	10	30 September 2021	1
7 October 2021	1	How Beautiful Life Can Be	The Lathums	1	7 October 2021	1
7 October 2021	1	Bright Magic	Public Service Broadcasting	2	7 October 2021	1
7 October 2021	1	Firebird	Natalie Imbruglia	10	7 October 2021	1
14 October 2021	2	Tales from the Script: Greatest Hits	The Script	1	14 October 2021	1
14 October 2021	1	Protest Songs 1924–2012	The Specials	2	14 October 2021	1
14 October 2021	1	Outsider	Roger Taylor	3	14 October 2021	1
14 October 2021	1	Love for Sale	Tony Bennett & Lady Gaga	6	14 October 2021	1
14 October 2021	1	No Time to Die: Original Motion Picture Soundtrack	Hans Zimmer	7	14 October 2021	1
14 October 2021	1	Thanks for Waiting	Potter Payper	8	14 October 2021	1
21 October 2021	3	Seventeen Going Under	Sam Fender	1	21 October 2021	1
21 October 2021	1	Friends That Break Your Heart	James Blake	4	21 October 2021	1
21 October 2021	4	25	Adele	3	28 October 2021	1
28 October 2021	6	Music of the Spheres	Coldplay	1	28 October 2021	1
28 October 2021	1	Let It Be: Special Edition	The Beatles	2	28 October 2021	1
28 October 2021	1	60	Daniel O'Donnell	4	28 October 2021	1
28 October 2021	1	Skin	Joy Crookes	5	28 October 2021	1
28 October 2021	1	21	Adele	6	28 October 2021	1
28 October 2021	1	Sticky	Frank Carter and the Rattlesnakes	8	28 October 2021	1
4 November 2021	7	The Lockdown Sessions	Elton John	1	4 November 2021	1
4 November 2021	1	Blue Banisters	Lana Del Rey	2	4 November 2021	1
4 November 2021	1	Future Past	Duran Duran	3	4 November 2021	1
4 November 2021	1	The Myth of the Happily Ever After	Biffy Clyro	4	4 November 2021	1
4 November 2021	1	Tattoo You	The Rolling Stones	7	4 November 2021	1
4 November 2021	1	Seven Shades of Heartbreak (EP)	Mimi Webb	9	4 November 2021	1
11 November 2021	66	= (#2)	Ed Sheeran	1	11 November 2021	4
11 November 2021	1	Acoustic Hymns Vol 1	Richard Ashcroft	2	11 November 2021	1
11 November 2021	1	Spice	Spice Girls	5	11 November 2021	1
11 November 2021	1	I Don't Live Here Anymore	The War on Drugs	6	11 November 2021	1
18 November 2021	10	Voyage (#3)	ABBA	1	18 November 2021	1
18 November 2021	1	It'll All Make Sense in the End	James Arthur	3	18 November 2021	1
18 November 2021	1	Kid A Mnesia	Radiohead	4	18 November 2021	1
18 November 2021	1	Still Over It	Summer Walker	5	18 November 2021	1
18 November 2021	1	Thank You	Diana Ross	7	18 November 2021	1
18 November 2021	1	Still Rising: The Collection	Gregory Porter	8	18 November 2021	1
25 November 2021	3	Red (Taylor's Version)	Taylor Swift	1	25 November 2021	1
25 November 2021	20	Between Us ♦	Little Mix	3	5 May 2022	1
25 November 2021	5	The Tears of Hercules	Rod Stewart	5	25 November 2021	1
25 November 2021	1	Crawler	Idles	6	25 November 2021	1
25 November 2021	1	The Nearer the Fountain, More Pure the Stream Flows	Damon Albarn	7	25 November 2021	1
25 November 2021	1	Most Wanted: The Greatest Hits	The Wanted	8	25 November 2021	1
25 November 2021	1	An Evening with Silk Sonic	Silk Sonic	9	25 November 2021	1
2 December 2021	16	30 (#1)	Adele	1	2 December 2021	5
2 December 2021	1	Knebworth 1996	Oasis	4	2 December 2021	1
2 December 2021	1	Raise the Roof	Robert Plant & Alison Krauss	5	2 December 2021	1
2 December 2021	4	Home Alone 2	D-Block Europe	6	2 December 2021	2
2 December 2021	1	Flying Dream 1	Elbow	7	2 December 2021	1
2 December 2021	1	The Stars Beneath My Feet (2004-2021)	James Blunt	9	2 December 2021	1
9 December 2021	4	Wild Dreams	Westlife	2	9 December 2021	1
9 December 2021	1	The Dream of Christmas	Gary Barlow	5	9 December 2021	1
16 December 2021	1	2.0	JLS	4	16 December 2021	1
16 December 2021	3	Happy Together	Andre Rieu & the Johann Strauss Orchestra	5	30 December 2021	1
23 December 2021	1	An Orchestrated Songbook	Paul Weller with Jules Buckley & the BBC Symphony Orchestra	4	23 December 2021	1
23 December 2021	1	Fighting Demons	Juice Wrld	8	23 December 2021	1

== Entries by artist ==
The following table shows artists who have achieved two or more top 10 entries in 2021, including albums that reached their peak in 2020. The figures only include main artists, with featured artists and appearances on compilation albums not counted individually for each artist. The total number of weeks an artist spent in the top ten in 2021 is also shown.

Entries	Artist	Weeks	Albums
3	Adele	8	21, 25, 30
3	Mick Fleetwood	5	50 Years – Don't Stop, Rumours, Mick Fleetwood & Friends Celebrate the Music of Peter Green and the Early Years of Fleetwood Mac
3	Taylor Swift	11	Evermore, Fearless (Taylor's Version), Red (Taylor's Version)
2	ABBA	9	ABBA Gold: Greatest Hits, Voyage
2	Brian May	23	Back to the Light, Greatest Hits
2	Ed Sheeran	18	÷, =
2	Fleetwood Mac	4	50 Years – Don't Stop, Rumours
2	Fredo	3	Money Can't Buy Happiness, Independence Day
2	Little Mix	10	Confetti, Between Us
2	London Symphony Orchestra	2	Classic Diamonds, Promises
2	Paul Weller	2	Fat Pop (Volume 1), An Orchestrated Songbook
2	Pop Smoke	16	Shoot for the Stars, Aim for the Moon, Faith
2	Roger Taylor	23	Greatest Hits, Outsider

== See also ==
- List of UK Albums Chart number ones of the 2020s
