= List of UK top-ten albums in 2022 =

The UK Albums Chart is one of many music charts compiled by the Official Charts Company that calculates the best-selling albums of the week in the United Kingdom. Since 2004 the chart has been based on the sales of both physical albums and digital downloads. Since 2015, the album chart has been based on both sales and streaming. This list shows albums that peaked in the top ten of the UK Albums Chart during 2022, as well as albums which peaked in 2021 and 2023 but were in the top 10 in 2022. The entry date is when the album appeared in the top 10 for the first time (week ending, as published by the Official Charts Company, which is six days after the chart is announced).

Two-hundred and eight albums were in the top 10 this year. Twelve albums from 2021 remained in the top ten for several weeks at the beginning of the year, while Christmas by Michael Bublé, originally released in 2011, re-entered the chart in 2021, but did not reach its peak until 2023. Between Us by Little Mix was the only album from 2021 to reach its peak in 2022.

The first new number-one album of the year was Dawn FM by The Weeknd. Overall, thirty-seven different albums peaked at number-one in 2022, with thirty-seven unique artists hitting that position.

An asterisk (*) in the "Weeks in Top 10" column shows that the album is currently in the top 10.

== Background ==
=== Chart debuts ===
The following table (collapsed on desktop site) does not include acts who had previously charted as part of a group and secured their first top 10 solo album.

Artist	Number of top 10s	First entry	Chart position	Other entries
Yard Act	1	The Overload	2	—
Aurora	1	The Gods We Can Touch	8	—
Scarlet Rebels	1	See Through Blue	7	—
Mitski	1	Laurel Hell	6	—
Bad Boy Chiller Crew	1	Disrespectful	2	—
Gang of Youths	1	Angel in Realtime	10	—
The Mysterines	1	Reeling	9	—
Charli XCX	1	Crash	1	—
ArrDee	1	Pier Pressure	2	—
Sam Tompkins	1	Who Do You Pray To? (EP)	7	—
Koffee	1	Gifted	9	—
Wet Leg	1	Wet Leg	1	—
Kae Tempest	1	The Line Is a Curve	8	—
Pusha T	1	It's Almost Dry	7	—
Jack Harlow	1	Come Home the Kids Miss You	4	—
Tate McRae	1	I Used to Think I Could Fly	7	—
Porcupine Tree	1	Closure/Continuation	2	—
Lizzo	1	Special	6	—
Maggie Rogers	1	Surrender	6	—
Rina Sawayama	1	Hold the Girl	3	—

=== Best-selling albums ===
Harry Styles had the best-selling album of the year with Harry's House. = by Ed Sheeran came in second place. Taylor Swift's Midnights, The Highlights by The Weeknd and Olivia Rodrigo's Sour made up the top five. Albums by Eminem, Elton John, Fleetwood Mac, Little Mix and ABBA were also in the top ten best-selling albums of the year.

== Top-ten albums ==
Key

Symbol	Meaning
‡	Album peaked in 2021 but still in chart in 2022.
♦	Album released in 2022 but peaked in 2023.
(#)	Year-end top ten album position and rank
Entered	The date that the album first appeared in the chart.
Peak	Highest position that the song reached in the UK Albums Chart.

Entered (week ending)	Weeks in top 10	Album	Artist	Peak	Peak reached (week ending)	Weeks at peak
Albums in 2021
18 February 2021	212*	The Highlights ‡ (#4)	The Weeknd	2	18 February 2021	7
3 June 2021	54	Sour ‡ (#5)	Olivia Rodrigo	1	3 June 2021	5
5 August 2021	14	We're All Alone in This Together ‡	Dave	1	5 August 2021	2
12 August 2021	6	Happier Than Ever ‡	Billie Eilish	1	12 August 2021	1
9 September 2021	3	Only Honest on the Weekend ‡	Becky Hill	7	9 September 2021	2
28 October 2021	6	Music of the Spheres ‡	Coldplay	1	28 October 2021	1
11 November 2021	66	= ‡ (#2)	Ed Sheeran	1	11 November 2021	4
18 November 2021	10	Voyage ‡	ABBA	1	18 November 2021	1
25 November 2021	20	Between Us (#9)	Little Mix	3	5 May 2022	1
2 December 2021	16	30 ‡	Adele	1	2 December 2021	5
2 December 2021	4	Home Alone 2 ‡	D-Block Europe	6	2 December 2021	2
9 December 2021	9	Christmas ♦	Michael Bublé	1	5 January 2023	1
Albums in 2022
6 January 2022	8	Greatest Hits	Queen	7	11 August 2022	1
6 January 2022	7	Diamonds (#7)	Elton John	7	13 January 2022	2
13 January 2022	6	÷	Ed Sheeran	7	23 June 2022	1
13 January 2022	7	50 Years – Don't Stop (#8)	Fleetwood Mac	6	28 April 2022	1
20 January 2022	6	Dawn FM	The Weeknd	1	20 January 2022	1
20 January 2022	2	DS4Ever	Gunna	4	20 January 2022	1
20 January 2022	1	Toy (Toy Box)	David Bowie	5	20 January 2022	1
27 January 2022	1	Fix Yourself, Not the World	The Wombats	1	27 January 2022	1
27 January 2022	1	Fragments	Bonobo	5	27 January 2022	1
27 January 2022	1	The Boy Named If	Elvis Costello & the Imposters	6	27 January 2022	1
3 February 2022	2	Night Call	Years & Years	1	3 February 2022	1
3 February 2022	1	The Overload	Yard Act	2	3 February 2022	1
3 February 2022	1	Bat Out of Hell	Meat Loaf	3	3 February 2022	1
3 February 2022	1	Hits Out of Hell	Meat Loaf	5	3 February 2022	1
3 February 2022	1	The Gods We Can Touch	Aurora	8	3 February 2022	1
3 February 2022	1	World I Understand	The Sherlocks	9	3 February 2022	1
10 February 2022	1	Amazing Things	Don Broco	1	10 February 2022	1
10 February 2022	1	Moments	Jamie Webster	3	10 February 2022	1
10 February 2022	1	See Through Blue	Scarlet Rebels	7	10 February 2022	1
10 February 2022	1	The Zealot Gene	Jethro Tull	9	10 February 2022	1
17 February 2022	1	Give Me the Future	Bastille	1	17 February 2022	1
17 February 2022	1	Ants from Up There	Black Country, New Road	3	17 February 2022	1
17 February 2022	1	Charmed Life – The Best of the Divine Comedy	The Divine Comedy	5	17 February 2022	1
17 February 2022	1	Laurel Hell	Mitski	6	17 February 2022	1
17 February 2022	1	Psychodrama	Dave	7	17 February 2022	1
17 February 2022	1	Requiem	Korn	8	17 February 2022	1
24 February 2022	1	FTHC	Frank Turner	1	24 February 2022	1
24 February 2022	1	The Dream	Alt-J	3	24 February 2022	1
24 February 2022	1	4	Slash featuring Myles Kennedy & the Conspirators	5	24 February 2022	1
24 February 2022	1	Greatest Hits	James Morrison	6	24 February 2022	1
24 February 2022	12	Curtain Call: The Hits (#6)	Eminem	6	3 March 2022	1
3 March 2022	1	Disrespectful	Bad Boy Chiller Crew	2	3 March 2022	1
3 March 2022	1	Everything Was Forever	Sea Power	4	3 March 2022	1
3 March 2022	1	Small World	Metronomy	7	3 March 2022	1
10 March 2022	3	23	Central Cee	1	10 March 2022	1
10 March 2022	2	The Tipping Point	Tears for Fears	2	10 March 2022	1
10 March 2022	1	Love Sux	Avril Lavigne	3	10 March 2022	1
10 March 2022	1	Fever Dream Pts 1-4	Johnny Marr	4	10 March 2022	1
10 March 2022	1	Angel in Realtime	Gang of Youths	10	10 March 2022	1
17 March 2022	1	Oochya!	Stereophonics	1	17 March 2022	1
17 March 2022	1	An Hour Before It's Dark	Marillion	2	17 March 2022	1
17 March 2022	1	The Coral	The Coral	7	17 March 2022	1
24 March 2022	1	Who Cares?	Rex Orange County	1	24 March 2022	1
24 March 2022	1	Impera	Ghost	2	24 March 2022	1
24 March 2022	1	So Happy It Hurts	Bryan Adams	3	24 March 2022	1
24 March 2022	1	10 Year Plan	The Shires	5	24 March 2022	1
24 March 2022	1	7220	Lil Durk	6	24 March 2022	1
24 March 2022	1	Hits to the Head	Franz Ferdinand	7	24 March 2022	1
24 March 2022	1	Everything I Didn't Say	Ella Henderson	8	24 March 2022	1
24 March 2022	1	Reeling	The Mysterines	9	24 March 2022	1
31 March 2022	1	Crash	Charli XCX	1	31 March 2022	1
31 March 2022	4	Pier Pressure	ArrDee	2	31 March 2022	1
31 March 2022	1	Homesick	Sea Girls	3	31 March 2022	1
31 March 2022	1	Torpedo	Feeder	5	31 March 2022	1
31 March 2022	1	Who Do You Pray To? (EP)	Sam Tompkins	7	31 March 2022	1
7 April 2022	2	Higher	Michael Bublé	1	7 April 2022	1
7 April 2022	2	Mainstream Sellout	Machine Gun Kelly	2	7 April 2022	1
7 April 2022	1	Never Let Me Go	Placebo	3	7 April 2022	1
7 April 2022	1	Greatest Hits	Foo Fighters	5	7 April 2022	1
7 April 2022	1	The Beautiful Unknown	Matt Goss	7	7 April 2022	1
7 April 2022	1	Gifted	Koffee	9	7 April 2022	1
14 April 2022	2	Unlimited Love	Red Hot Chili Peppers	1	14 April 2022	1
14 April 2022	7	Fine Line	Harry Styles	6	14 April 2022	2
21 April 2022	2	Wet Leg	Wet Leg	1	21 April 2022	1
21 April 2022	1	Chloë and the Next 20th Century	Father John Misty	2	21 April 2022	1
21 April 2022	1	Fear of the Dawn	Jack White	3	21 April 2022	1
21 April 2022	1	The Line Is a Curve	Kae Tempest	8	21 April 2022	1
21 April 2022	1	Familia	Camila Cabello	9	21 April 2022	1
28 April 2022	2	Noughty by Nature	Digga D	1	28 April 2022	1
5 May 2022	1	Skinty Fia	Fontaines D.C.	1	5 May 2022	1
5 May 2022	1	Everything Was Beautiful	Spiritualized	5	5 May 2022	1
5 May 2022	1	It's Almost Dry	Pusha T	7	5 May 2022	1
12 May 2022	1	Ribbon Around the Bomb	Blossoms	1	12 May 2022	1
12 May 2022	1	I Never Liked You	Future	2	12 May 2022	1
12 May 2022	1	Zeit	Rammstein	3	12 May 2022	1
12 May 2022	1	Dopamine	Thunder	5	12 May 2022	1
12 May 2022	1	Alpha Games	Bloc Party	7	12 May 2022	1
19 May 2022	1	We	Arcade Fire	1	19 May 2022	1
19 May 2022	1	How to Let Go	Sigrid	2	19 May 2022	1
19 May 2022	1	Alpha Place	Knucks	3	19 May 2022	1
19 May 2022	1	Come Home the Kids Miss You	Jack Harlow	4	19 May 2022	1
19 May 2022	1	Happiness Not Included	Soft Cell	7	19 May 2022	1
19 May 2022	1	A Bit of Previous	Belle and Sebastian	8	19 May 2022	1
19 May 2022	1	Back from the Dead	Halestorm	9	19 May 2022	1
26 May 2022	2	Dance Fever	Florence and the Machine	1	26 May 2022	1
26 May 2022	5	Mr. Morale & the Big Steppers	Kendrick Lamar	2	26 May 2022	1
26 May 2022	1	Dropout Boogie	The Black Keys	5	26 May 2022	1
26 May 2022	1	Blue Hours	Bear's Den	6	26 May 2022	1
2 June 2022	57	Harry's House (#1)	Harry Styles	1	2 June 2022	6
2 June 2022	1	Raw Data Feel	Everything Everything	4	2 June 2022	1
2 June 2022	1	Chasing Euphoria	M Huncho	5	2 June 2022	1
2 June 2022	1	Greatest Hits	N-Dubz	10	2 June 2022	1
9 June 2022	2	C'mon You Know	Liam Gallagher	1	9 June 2022	1
9 June 2022	1	Down by the River Thames	Liam Gallagher	4	9 June 2022	1
9 June 2022	1	Diamond Star Halos	Def Leppard	5	9 June 2022	1
9 June 2022	1	20 Years: The Greatest Hits	Will Young	6	9 June 2022	1
9 June 2022	1	I Used to Think I Could Fly	Tate McRae	7	9 June 2022	1
9 June 2022	12	ABBA Gold: Greatest Hits (#10)	ABBA	6	6 October 2022	1
16 June 2022	2	Twelve Carat Toothache	Post Malone	3	16 June 2022	1
16 June 2022	1	Dear Scott	Michael Head & the Red Elastic Band	6	16 June 2022	1
23 June 2022	9	Gold Rush Kid	George Ezra	1	23 June 2022	1
23 June 2022	1	What Came Before	Chase & Status	4	23 June 2022	1
23 June 2022	1	Proof	BTS	8	23 June 2022	1
30 June 2022	4	Honestly, Nevermind	Drake	2	30 June 2022	1
30 June 2022	1	Life Is Yours	Foals	3	30 June 2022	1
30 June 2022	1	A Light for Attracting Attention	The Smile	5	30 June 2022	1
7 July 2022	1	Closure/Continuation	Porcupine Tree	2	7 July 2022	1
7 July 2022	1	Breezy	Chris Brown	6	7 July 2022	1
7 July 2022	1	Superache	Conan Gray	8	7 July 2022	1
7 July 2022	1	Growin' Up	Luke Combs	9	7 July 2022	1
14 July 2022	4	Last Night in the Bittersweet	Paolo Nutini	1	14 July 2022	1
14 July 2022	1	Planet Zero	Shinedown	4	14 July 2022	1
14 July 2022	1	Unprecedented	UB40 featuring Ali & Astro	8	14 July 2022	1
21 July 2022	2	Love, Damini	Burna Boy	2	21 July 2022	1
21 July 2022	1	Leap	James Bay	4	21 July 2022	1
21 July 2022	1	Wasteland	Brent Faiyaz	6	21 July 2022	1
28 July 2022	1	About Last Night...	Mabel	2	28 July 2022	1
28 July 2022	1	Beatopia	Beabadoobee	4	28 July 2022	1
28 July 2022	1	Special	Lizzo	6	28 July 2022	1
4 August 2022	1	The Theory of Whatever	Jamie T	1	4 August 2022	1
4 August 2022	1	Entering Heaven Alive	Jack White	4	4 August 2022	1
11 August 2022	11	Renaissance	Beyoncé	1	11 August 2022	2
11 August 2022	1	Surrender	Maggie Rogers	6	11 August 2022	1
18 August 2022	2	Curtain Call 2	Eminem	3	18 August 2022	1
18 August 2022	1	Funk Wav Bounces Vol. 2	Calvin Harris	5	18 August 2022	1
25 August 2022	1	The Alchemist's Euphoria	Kasabian	1	25 August 2022	1
25 August 2022	1	Unwanted	Pale Waves	4	25 August 2022	1
25 August 2022	3	ELV1S: 30 No. 1 Hits	Elvis Presley	7	25 August 2022	1
1 September 2022	1	Platinum Collection	Steps	1	1 September 2022	1
1 September 2022	1	Close to Home	Aitch	2	1 September 2022	1
1 September 2022	1	Finally Enough Love	Madonna	3	1 September 2022	1
1 September 2022	1	Viva Las Vengeance	Panic at the Disco	5	1 September 2022	1
1 September 2022	1	Be Here Now	Oasis	6	1 September 2022	1
1 September 2022	1	Holy Fvck	Demi Lovato	7	1 September 2022	1
8 September 2022	2	Will of the People	Muse	1	8 September 2022	1
8 September 2022	1	God Did	DJ Khaled	4	8 September 2022	1
8 September 2022	9	AM	Arctic Monkeys	7	15 September 2022	1
8 September 2022	1	How to Be a Person Like Other People	Embrace	9	8 September 2022	1
15 September 2022	1	Yungblud	Yungblud	1	15 September 2022	1
15 September 2022	1	The Sick, the Dying... and the Dead!	Megadeth	3	15 September 2022	1
22 September 2022	1	XXV	Robbie Williams	1	22 September 2022	1
22 September 2022	1	Patient Number 9	Ozzy Osbourne	2	22 September 2022	1
22 September 2022	1	Know Your Enemy	Manic Street Preachers	4	22 September 2022	1
22 September 2022	1	How Will I Know if Heaven Will Find Me?	The Amazons	5	22 September 2022	1
22 September 2022	2	Divinely Uninspired to a Hellish Extent	Lewis Capaldi	9	22 September 2022	2
29 September 2022	1	Born Pink	Blackpink	1	29 September 2022	1
29 September 2022	1	Autofiction	Suede	2	29 September 2022	1
29 September 2022	1	Hold the Girl	Rina Sawayama	3	29 September 2022	1
29 September 2022	1	Self-Titled	Marcus Mumford	4	29 September 2022	1
29 September 2022	1	Animals	Pink Floyd	5	29 September 2022	1
6 October 2022	1	5SOS5	5 Seconds of Summer	1	6 October 2022	1
6 October 2022	3	Lap 5	D-Block Europe	2	6 October 2022	1
6 October 2022	1	Gulp!	Sports Team	3	6 October 2022	1
6 October 2022	1	Land of Dreams	Mark Owen	5	6 October 2022	1
6 October 2022	1	EBM	Editors	10	6 October 2022	1
13 October 2022	1	The End, So Far	Slipknot	1	13 October 2022	1
13 October 2022	1	Older	George Michael	2	13 October 2022	1
13 October 2022	1	Burn the Empire	The Snuts	3	13 October 2022	1
13 October 2022	1	22	Craig David	7	13 October 2022	1
13 October 2022	1	Cool It Down	Yeah Yeah Yeahs	10	13 October 2022	1
20 October 2022	1	N.K-Pop	Paul Heaton & Jacqui Abbott	1	20 October 2022	1
20 October 2022	1	Maybe in Another Life...	Easy Life	2	20 October 2022	1
20 October 2022	1	Charlie	Charlie Puth	9	20 October 2022	1
27 October 2022	2	Being Funny in a Foreign Language	The 1975	1	27 October 2022	1
27 October 2022	1	Return of the Dream Canteen	Red Hot Chili Peppers	2	27 October 2022	1
27 October 2022	1	It's Only Me	Lil Baby	3	27 October 2022	1
27 October 2022	1	Pawns & Kings	Alter Bridge	6	27 October 2022	1
27 October 2022	1	Here Is Everything	The Big Moon	9	27 October 2022	1
3 November 2022	57	Midnights (#3)	Taylor Swift	1	3 November 2022	5
3 November 2022	3	The Car	Arctic Monkeys	2	3 November 2022	1
3 November 2022	1	Hugo	Loyle Carner	3	3 November 2022	1
3 November 2022	1	Direction of the Heart	Simple Minds	4	3 November 2022	1
3 November 2022	1	Impossible Princess	Kylie Minogue	5	3 November 2022	1
10 November 2022	1	Revolver: Special Edition	The Beatles	2	10 November 2022	1
10 November 2022	2	Together in Vegas	Michael Ball & Alfie Boe	3	10 November 2022	1
10 November 2022	1	Actual Life 3 (January 1 – September 9, 2022)	Fred Again	4	10 November 2022	1
10 November 2022	1	Triggered!	Massive Wagons	6	10 November 2022	1
10 November 2022	1	Best Day of My Life	Tom Odell	7	10 November 2022	1
10 November 2022	1	The Essential Foo Fighters	Foo Fighters	10	10 November 2022	1
17 November 2022	3	Her Loss	Drake & 21 Savage	1	17 November 2022	1
17 November 2022	1	Palomino	First Aid Kit	3	17 November 2022	1
17 November 2022	1	A Song for You	Luke Evans	4	17 November 2022	1
24 November 2022	1	Faith in the Future	Louis Tomlinson	1	24 November 2022	1
24 November 2022	5	Only the Strong Survive	Bruce Springsteen	2	24 November 2022	1
24 November 2022	5	A Family Christmas	Andrea, Matteo & Virginia Bocelli	4	8 December 2022	1
1 December 2022	1	Sonder	Dermot Kennedy	1	1 December 2022	1
1 December 2022	5	Silver Bells	André Rieu & the Johann Strauss Orchestra	4	1 December 2022	1
1 December 2022	1	The Miracle	Queen	6	1 December 2022	1
1 December 2022	1	Get Rollin'	Nickelback	8	1 December 2022	1
8 December 2022	1	This Is What I Mean	Stormzy	1	8 December 2022	1
8 December 2022	4	Christmas with Cliff	Cliff Richard	2	8 December 2022	2
8 December 2022	1	Wish	The Cure	9	8 December 2022	1
15 December 2022	1	Marry Me	Olly Murs	1	15 December 2022	1
15 December 2022	2	Heroes & Villains	Metro Boomin	3	15 December 2022	1
22 December 2022	4	There's Nothing but Space, Man!	Sam Ryder	1	22 December 2022	1
22 December 2022	17	SOS	SZA	2	22 December 2022	3

== Entries by artist ==
The following table shows artists who have achieved two or more top 10 entries in 2022, including albums that reached their peak in 2021. The figures only include main artists, with featured artists and appearances on compilation albums not counted individually for each artist. The total number of weeks an artist spent in the top ten in 2022 is also shown.

Entries	Artist	Weeks	Albums
3	Liam Gallagher	3	C'mon You Know, Down by the River Thames, Be Here Now
2	ABBA	15	Voyage, ABBA Gold: Greatest Hits
2	Arctic Monkeys	11	AM, The Car
2	Dave	4	Psychodrama, We're All Alone in This Together
2	D-Block Europe	6	Home Alone 2, Lap 5
2	Drake	7	Honestly, Nevermind, Her Loss
2	Ed Sheeran	47	÷, =
2	Eminem	13	Curtain Call: The Hits, Curtain Call 2
2	Foo Fighters	2	Greatest Hits, The Essential Foo Fighters
2	Harry Styles	33	Fine Line, Harry's House
2	Jack White	2	Fear of the Dawn, Entering Heaven Alive
2	Meat Loaf	1	Bat Out of Hell, Hits Out of Hell
2	Michael Bublé	6	Christmas, Higher
2	Queen	9	Greatest Hits, The Miracle
2	Red Hot Chili Peppers	3	Unlimited Love, Return of the Dream Canteen
2	The Weeknd	29	The Highlights, Dawn FM

== See also ==
- List of UK Albums Chart number ones of the 2020s
