= Afraid of Tomorrows =

Studio album by the Mysterines
- Released: 21 June 2024
- Studio: John Congleton's studio (Los Angeles)
- Genre: Rock
- Length: 44:43
- Label: Fiction
- Producer: John Congleton

The Mysterines chronology
Reeling (2022)	Afraid of Tomorrows (2024)

Singles from Afraid of Tomorrows
- 1. "Stray" Released: 20 February 2024; 2. "Sink Ya Teeth" Released: 8 April 2024; 3. "The Last Dance" Released: 18 June 2024

Afraid of Tomorrows is the second album by British alternative rock band the Mysterines, released on 21 June 2024 by Fiction Records. After extensive touring for their debut album, Reeling, the band took to writing sessions in the English countryside, inspired primarily by the documentary film Meet Me in the Bathroom, with a changed sound and new lyrical focus to differentiate from their debut. They recorded for five weeks in Los Angeles with John Congleton. The album was preceded by three singles and a music video for the first. It is a rock album, with songs spanning multiple subgenres. Critical reception of the album was mostly positive.

== Background ==
Per Mysterines frontwoman Lia Metcalfe, the recording of the band's debut album, Reeling, was frustrating. She noted struggling with the fragmented recording schedule brought on by the COVID-19 pandemic and subsequent restrictions. Despite those issues, however, the album was successful, charting in the top 10 of the UK Albums Chart and landing them a spot opening for the Arctic Monkeys on The Car Tour. Including that tour, as well as tours with the Hives and Frank Carter and the Rattlesnakes, the band toured for Reeling for 18 months. During that time, they also released the standalone single "Begin Again".

== Writing and recording ==
In order to decompress after the excitement of touring, the band traveled to various small towns across the English countryside, including Hexham, Northumberland, for their writing sessions. The sessions were more collaborative than those for Reeling, which had been written during the COVID-19 lockdown. "Hawkmoon" was the first song written for the album, written in summer 2022 not long after the release of Reeling. In a studio session just before embarking on tour with the Arctic Monkeys, the band wrote "The Last Dance", "Stray", and "Goodbye Sunshine". Per drummer Paul Crilly, those songs "just made everything else that we'd done before that make so much more sense. I think when we wrote 'The Last Dance', that glued everything together." The band wrote nearly 40 songs in sessions for the record, with the ones which "provoked an emotion" being those they included.

The band made a deliberate effort to shift their sound for the new album. Crilly called the writing sessions "a fresh start", and Metcalfe said the band knew each other better both musically and personally than they did when they wrote Reeling, leading to a desire to "work the mechanics of the band better." On his belief that bands should aim for variety in their discography, drummer Callum Thompson said:

You look at people who try one-upping themselves in the same and it's usually better when they weren't overthinking it. We're different people from who we were a few years ago. We've been introduced to new films, art, music; that moulds who you become. It's a journey we all go through together.

[Afraid of Tomorrows] is more relevant to what we want to create. I don't think that at any song [sic] being released is a true reflection of who the artist is at that exact given time, but it is a reflection of what you want to create and the direction you want to steer yourself sonically as a band.

The lyrical focus also changed from Metcalfe describing her youthful turmoil on Reeling to focusing on her present-day perspective. She said it "wasn't a conscious choice or an intentional thing to be more vulnerable", but that ultimately it was a cathartic experience.

They took their work to Los Angeles to record with producer John Congleton in his newly-built studio, staying in the city for five weeks. Congleton sold the band on working with him by saying that "if [the band] wanted to make anything like the first record, then he wasn't our guy", which Thompson said "was exactly what we wanted. We wanted to completely rip it all up, and the fact he said that [proved] he was seeing the same sky." Metcalfe said the band felt at home in Los Angeles, particularly where they stayed in Echo Park, noting that some of their major influences including Tom Waits and Elliott Smith are from the area. Metcalfe borrowed a bow from a violinist friend to play her guitar with for "The Last Dance".

The band were inspired by the documentary film Meet Me in the Bathroom, which told the stories of 1990s and 2000s New York City rock bands including the Strokes, Yeah Yeah Yeahs, LCD Soundsystem, and Interpol. Frontwoman Lia Metcalfe said the documentary led the band to "re-indulge" in their favorite bands which inspired them in their childhoods. Lead single "Stray", in particular, was an attempt to "create a song that would fit in that world". Other inspirations named by Metcalfe include Billie Holiday's autobiography Lady Sings the Blues.

== Release ==
The album was announced on 20 February 2024, with the original release date set for 7 June by Fiction Records. Along with the announcement, the group released the lead single, "Stray", which was premiered on Clara Amfo's BBC Radio 1 show. "Stray" came with a music video, directed by Matilda Harding-Kemp, in which Metcalfe performs a fully choreographed dance routine, something she had never done before. Writers described "Stray" as "a powerful return that bristles with energy" and "filled with brooding guitar, electric drums and sleek vocals."

The second single, "Sink Ya Teeth", was released on 8 April. Per Metcalfe, the song is "a testament to the brutality of real love. Written during a time where the boundaries of pain and passion were warped amidst the chaos of addiction and desire."

On 14 May, it was announced that the release of the album would be delayed to 21 June.

The third and final single, "The Last Dance", was released on 18 June, with a music video described as "ETA Hoffmannesque". The band previewed the song on 14 June on The Independent's web series Music Box. Per Metcalfe, the sound tells "a story about someone falling in love with a porcelain mannequin, yes. Loneliness can bring you to reach out for comfort from things that are inanimate, things that you should never to receive anything back from. The repetition of the chorus is based upon the wish that this inanimate object would help you, but really, it serves as a call for help."

== Live ==
On 23 February, the band announced a tour of Europe, their first-ever headlining tour, for 16 dates across October and November. However, on 31 August, the band announced that the tour was cancelled due to unspecified "recent circumstances".

In May, the band performed at Focus Wales in Wrexham. In July, the band performed in England at 2000trees and Truck Festival, and to support Bloc Party's 20th anniversary concert at London's Crystal Palace Park along with the Hives, Friendly Fires, and Connie Constance.

== Style and themes ==
The album consists of rock music, with different songs covering various subgenres including garage rock, grunge, mainstream rock, blues rock, and country rock. Its sound drew comparisons to bands which the Mysterines called influences such as the Strokes, Yeah Yeah Yeahs, and LCD Soundsystem, as well as PJ Harvey, Garbage, and Placebo.

The album focuses on themes of paranoia, guilt, impostor syndrome, temptation, and addiction.

== Reception ==
Afraid of Tomorrows ratings
Aggregate scores
Source	Rating
Metacritic	84/100
Review scores
Source	Rating
DIY	4/5 stars
Dork	4/5 stars
Far Out	4/5 stars
Humo	3/5 stars
The Line of Best Fit	8/10
MusicOMH	4.5/5 stars

According to the review aggregator Metacritic, Afraid of Tomorrows received "universal acclaim" based on a weighted average score of 84 out of 100 from 4 critic scores.

The Line of Best Fit's Matt Young wrote that "A strong love and fight for life and its experiences drives this album forward and even though it ends with Metcalfe singing, 'I'm so afraid of tomorrow', you can only envisage great things awaiting them with this brand-new set of musical armour going forward." Humo's Katia Vlerick said "the songs dig deeper, but that new-found ambition also sometimes makes the album fall through the ice."

Louder Than War called Afraid of Tomorrows their album of the week, with Ian Corbridge calling it "a more personal and intimate album which extends to so many more dimensions compared with the foreboding and bombastic charm of their debut. However, it is still another beast of an album that harnesses the grunge and psychedelic influences which always sit at the Mysterines' core, thereby giving it an unparallelled power and menace which could unsettle anyone who might try and stand in its way."

DIY's Sarah Jamieson wrote that the band "may have bucked expectations here, but in venturing into the shadows, they've made their boldest move yet." Far Out's Lucy Harbron said the band "deliver quality from start to finish" and that the entire album "is a skip-free journey across the various corners of rock music." Dork's Rebecca Kesteven wrote that the album "is a roaring success (at some points, quite literally). [The band's] classic ferocity in combination with the slower, sadder moments make the album fresh, invigorating, and for the most part, great for a mosh pit."

== Track listing ==
All tracks are written by Lia Metcalfe and Paul Crilly except where noted.

Afraid of Tomorrows track listing
No.	Title	Writer(s)	Length
1.	"The Last Dance"		4:30
2.	"Stray"		3:36
3.	"Another Another Another"	Metcalfe	3:19
4.	"Tired Animal"		4:06
5.	"Jesse You're a Superstar"		3:58
6.	"Hawkmoon"		3:51
7.	"Sink Ya Teeth"		3:27
8.	"Junkyard Angel"		3:15
9.	"Goodbye Sunshine"		3:32
10.	"Inside a Matchbox"		4:28
11.	"So Long"		4:00
12.	"Afraid of Tomorrows"		2:41
Total length:			44:43

== Personnel ==
=== Musicians ===
- Lia Metcalfe – lead vocals, backing vocals (2–6), guitar (2–6, 8–10), synthesiser (1), tambourine (1, 12), piano (5), acoustic guitar (8), Mellotron (9)
- George Favager – bass guitar (1–11), synthesiser (1, 4, 6, 8), baritone guitar (5), backing vocals (4), Mellotron (8), Stylophone (8)
- Callum Thompson – electric guitar (1–9, 11), baritone guitar (3, 10), guitar (10), backing vocals (2, 4–6, 11)
- Paul Crilly – drums (1–11), percussion (1, 2, 4, 8, 10), acoustic guitar (1, 6, 9, 10–12), guitar (2, 4, 7), electric guitar (6), backing vocals (1, 4–7, 11, 12), piano (3, 4, 6, 7, 11), synthesiser (1, 4), Mellotron (11), glockenspiel (11)
- John Congleton – piano (7–9), synthesiser (1, 3, 7–9)

=== Technical ===
- John Congleton – producer (1–11), recording engineer (1–11), mixing engineer
- Sean Cook – mixing engineer (1–11), recording engineer (3, 4, 6, 8)
- Felix Davis – mastering engineer
- Matthew Kent – immersive mix engineer
- Lia Metcalfe and Paul Crilly – producer (12)

== Charts ==
Chart performance for Afraid of Tomorrows
Chart (2024)	Peak position
Scottish Albums (Official Charts)	2
UK Albums (Official Charts)	11
