= Move Through the Dawn =

Studio album by the Coral
- Released: 10 August 2018
- Studio: Parr Street
- Genre: Psychedelia, folk rock
- Length: 34:13
- Label: Ignition
- Producer: The Coral, Rich Turvey

The Coral chronology
Distance Inbetween (2016)	Move Through the Dawn (2018)	Coral Island (2021)

Singles from Move Through the Dawn
- 1. "Sweet Release" Released: 1 February 2019

Move Through the Dawn is the ninth studio album by English rock band the Coral. It was released on 10 August 2018, under Ignition Records.

== Background and production ==
The Coral released their eighth studio album Distance Inbetween in March 2016, through Ignition Records. It marked the introduction of guitarist Paul Molloy, who took over permanently from Lee Southall after he had left two years prior. Over the course of the next two years, the band toured, operated their own label Skeleton Key Records and ran Parr Street Studios. Frontman James Skelly spent sometime producing albums for the Blossoms, while keyboardist Nick Power released an album and book, both titled Caravan (2017).

The Coral wrote an album's worth of material in the vein of Distance Inbetween and almost recorded those songs until they changed their minds. They felt they were "playing it too safe" and decided to do the opposite, focusing on melody and writing pop songs. From there, it took them another six months before they entered a studio. Move Through the Dawn was recorded at Parr Street in Liverpool, England, with the band and Rich Turvey acting as producers; Turvey also served as the engineer. They mixed the recordings, before the album was mastered by Robin Schmidt at 24–96 Mastering.

== Composition and lyrics ==
Musically, the sound of Move Through the Dawn has been described as psychedelia, and folk rock, with influence from Merseybeat and Motown. In contrast to the heavier, 1970s-indebted Distance Inbetween, Move Through the Dawn sees the band explore 1980s Jeff Lynne-styled production, full of clipping drums, vocal harmonies and a Mellotron. Several of the band's friends contributed to the recordings: Jack Prince played a Moog on "Reaching Out for a Friend" and "Sweet Release", and tapped his foot on "After the Fair"; Turvey added keyboards to "Eyes Like Pearls", "Sweet Release", "Love or Solution" and "After the Fair", and handclaps on "Reaching Out for a Friend"; Charlie Salt of Blossoms sung backing vocals on "Sweet Release"; Niamh Rowe of the Sundowners sung backing vocals on "Eyes of the Moon"; and Zak McDonnell of the Mysterines did handclaps on "Reaching Out for a Friend".

James Skelly wrote the majority of the album by himself, co-writing the remainder with Turvey, Mike Halls of Clean Cut Kid, Power, drummer Ian Skelly, or Molloy. James Skelly said the album had a loose theme about "trying to find something real when the world is getting more digital. [...] How we’re becoming dehumanised". The title refers to "reaching out for a friend. How much better it is talking to someone and trying to find some common ground rather than arguing about it on Twitter". The opening track, "Eyes Like Pearls", features jangly guitarwork, with influence from krautrock, and deals with optimism. The near-new wave "Reaching Out for a Friend" was seen by one critic as the "sonic cousin" of "Holy Mountain" (2017) by Noel Gallagher's High Flying Birds. James Skelly said the track discussed "looking for something in common with someone, rather than looking for something to fall out about". "Sweet Release" evokes the works of Greta Van Fleet and Super Furry Animals.

"She's a Runaway" is an electroacoustic song about a girl running away from home, and is followed by the psychedelic soul track "Strangers in the Hollow". "Love or Solution" sees Skelly singing in a falsetto, backed by an organ and a Southern rock guitar riff. The tracks sees the narrator questions his own rationale for a romantic life. "Eyes of the Moon", which talks about a femme fatale, features a flute and echoes the sound of their second studio album Magic and Medicine (2003). The bossa nova drum pattern in "Undercover of the Night" earned it a comparison to "Another Satellite" (1986) by XTC. "Outside My Window" and "Stormbreaker" evoke the heavier sound of Distance Inbetween; the former also recalls 1960s psychedelia, most notably early Pink Floyd, while the latter leans towards British Invasion acts. The album closes with "After the Fair", an acoustic ballad with a Mellotron. It evolved out of a rendition of Bert Jansch's version of "Blues Run the Game" (1965) by Jackson C. Frank; "After the Fair" dates back to the era of the band's sixth studio album Butterfly House (2010).

== Release ==
On 20 April 2018, Move Through the Dawn was announced for release in four months' time. Coinciding with this, a music video was released for "Sweet Release", which was directed by James Slater. Around this time, the band supported the Manic Street Preachers on their UK tour. Following this, they appeared at Bearded Theory Festival and Neighbourhood Weekender. On 28 June 2018, a music video was released for "Eyes Like Pearls"; it was directed by Neil Mclean, and described by the band as "like a cross between Button Moon and Short Circuit". A music video was released for "After the Fair" on 3 August 2018, which was also directed by Slater and shot in Llandudno. Originally scheduled for 17 August 2018, Move Through the Dawn was released a week earlier on 10 August through Ignition Records.

They supported Ocean Colour Scene at a one-off show, and appeared at the Camper Calling and Electric Fields festivals. A music video was released for "Reaching Out for a Friend" on 31 August 2018, directed by drummer Ian Skelly and Dom Foster. It is an animated video showcasing a psychedelic-tinged world, complete with smiling ladybirds, human-faced flowers and fish that have human heads. Skelly was inspired by The Poddington Peas, in an attempt to make something akin to the show "[but] on acid"; he drew 60 characters that were then animated by Foster. In September 2018, the band headlined their own festival, dubbed the Skeleton Coast Festival; the following month, they went a tour of the UK, with She Drew the Gun and Cut Glass Kings. "Sweet Release" was released as a single on 1 February 2019, with "Today" as an extra track. In July 2019, the band headlined Llanfest.

== Reception ==
Professional ratings
Aggregate scores
Source	Rating
AnyDecentMusic?	6.7/10
Metacritic	67/100
Review scores
Source	Rating
AllMusic	4/5 stars
Clash	5/10
DIY	4/5 stars
The Guardian	4/5 stars
God Is in the TV	8/10
The Irish Times	4/5 stars
Louder Than War	4/5 stars
musicOMH	3/5 stars
PopMatters	6/10
Record Collector	4/5 stars

Move Through the Dawn was met with generally favourable reviews from music critics. At Metacritic, which assigns a normalized rating out of 100 to reviews from mainstream publications, the album received an average score of 67, based on 10 reviews. AnyDecentMusic? gave it a score of 6.7, based on 12 reviews.

AllMusic reviewer Tim Sendra complimented the "carefully constructed" production, with James Skelly's voice "fit[ting] well in the updated surroundings; he delivers the songs here just as powerfully as he did" on the Coral's earlier releases. He noted that while they "may have done some drastic reshuffling and tried some new things" with the album, "it's a Coral record at its core and it's one of their most satisfying, too." DIY writer Dan Owens said that the band "may have been at this game for nigh-on two decades but there's scarcely a moment here that seems tired or phoned-in", proposing that they "added another fascinating work to their canon." The Guardian critic Dave Simpson wrote that there was "nothing here that pushes the envelope for pop, or even for the Coral, but there doesn’t always need to be." He added that it was "another lovely, solid effort from one of Britain’s most enduring bands." God Is in the TV contributor Tim Russell found that aside from a "poptastic" first third of the album, it does a "wonderful pivot" into a "vintage Coral album" for the remainder of its length. He said it "captures summer in a bottle and will help you handle autumn", declaring it the band's best effort since their fourth studio album Roots & Echoes (2007).

Eamon Sweeney of The Irish Times said that the band managed to "hit a mid-career high" with Through the Dawn Record Collector writer Oregano Rathbone said it took multiple listens for "the potions on Move Through The Dawn to take effect", as the "patiently insistent refrains are apparently lodgers for life in whatever constitutes your mind palace." Louder Than War's Nathan Whittle said each track "stands out from the rest in its own way, marking its own territory, much in the same way as those on their debut", with the main difference being "the maturity in their songwriting [and] the lush arrangements". musicOMH writer Neil Dowden wrote that the album was "laden with sweet melodies", however, "the songs tend to be on the bland side so that you long for something to spice them up." He added that "this slightly over-polished album glides along serenely without grabbing you by the ears." PopMatters reviewer Richard Driver wrote that the album featured "some compelling hooks, but ultimately feels like a forgettable sidestep away from its dynamic predecessor." Clash's Gareth James wrote that the album had to "work twice as hard to impress after the initial horror of its ghastly artwork." He complimented the "unshakeably direct guitar licks of old", and Skelly's voice staying as "warmly melodic as ever, but the elusive spark is largely absent."

Move Through the Dawn reached number 14 in both the UK and Scotland, number 150 in the Wallonia region of Belgium, number 170 in France, and number 184 in the Flanders region of Belgium.

=== Accolades ===
Accolades for Move Through the Dawn
Publication	Accolade	Rank
Gigwise	Gigwise's 51 Best Albums of 2018	19
God Is in the TV	GIITTV Album Of The Year Poll 2018	64
Louder Than War	Albums of the Year 2018	42

== Track listing ==
All tracks written by James Skelly, except where noted.

Move Through the Dawn track listing
No.	Title	Writer(s)	Length
1.	"Eyes Like Pearls"	James Skelly; Rich Turvey; Mike Halls	2:46
2.	"Reaching Out for a Friend"		2:48
3.	"Sweet Release"	J. Skelly; Nick Power	2:50
4.	"She's a Runaway"	J. Skelly; Power; Ian Skelly	3:27
5.	"Strangers in the Hollow"		2:53
6.	"Love or Solution"		3:23
7.	"Eyes of the Moon"		2:47
8.	"Undercover of the Night"		3:03
9.	"Outside My Window"	J. Skelly; Turvey; Power	2:44
10.	"Stormbreaker"	J. Skelly; Power; Paul Molloy	4:41
11.	"After the Fair"		2:51

== Personnel ==
Credits adapted from liner notes.

The Coral

- James Skelly – lead vocals, guitar
- Ian Skelly – drums, percussion, backing vocals
- Nick Power – keyboards, guitar (track 11)
- Paul Duffy – bass, backing vocals
- Paul Molloy – guitar, piano

Additional musicians

- Jack Prince – Moog (tracks 2 and 3), foot tap (track 11)
- Rich Turvey – keyboards (tracks 1, 3, 6 and 11), handclaps (track 2)
- Charlie Salt – backing vocals (track 3)
- Niamh Rowe – backing vocals (track 7)
- Zak McDonnell – handclaps (track 2)

Production and design

- The Coral – producer, mixing
- Rich Turvey – producer, mixing, engineer
- Robin Schmidt – mastering
- Ian Skelly – artwork, design
- Anna Benson – artwork
- Scott Hamill – design, layout
- Jack Prince – photography
- John Badham – photography
- Claire Meredith – photography

== Charts ==
Chart performance for Move Through the Dawn
Chart (2018)	Peak position
Belgian Albums (Ultratop Flanders)	184
Belgian Albums (Ultratop Wallonia)	150
French Albums (SNEP)	170
Scottish Albums (OCC)	14
UK Albums (OCC)	14
UK Independent Albums (OCC)	1
