= Matter Does Not Define =

Studio album by the Lathums
- Released: 28 February 2025
- Studios: Kempston Street, Liverpool
- Genres: Alternative Rock, Indie Rock
- Length: 42:35
- Label: Modern Sky UK
- Producers: John Kettle; Chris Taylor

The Lathums chronology
From Nothing to a Little Bit More (2023)	Matter Does Not Define (2025)

Singles from Matter Does Not Define
- 1. "No Direction" Released: 15 July 2024; 2. "Stellar Cast" Released: 28 October 2024; 3. "Long Shadows" Released: 6 December 2024; 4. "Heartbreaker" Released: 24 January 2025

Matter Does Not Define is the third studio album by English rock band the Lathums. The album was released on 28 February 2025 through Modern Sky UK.

The album's lead single "No Direction" was released on 15 July 2024, with the album being announced on 28 October 2024. The second single "Stellar Cast" was followed by the release of third single "Long Shadows" on 6 December 2024. The album was released a week earlier, as the original release date was 7 March.

The album cover image is looking down through the spiral staircase at the Art Deco Midland Hotel in Morecambe, Lancashire, England.

== Background ==
The band's lead singer Alex Moore spoke of the album, saying “We’ve had a lot of fun creating album three. Though only a couple of years have passed since our last album, it feels like we’ve matured immensely as musicians." He described a lyric from "Reflections of Lessons Left" as “powerful and important to the times we live in”. The lyric was the first one written for the album and Moore noted it as “the catalyst for the whole album, setting its tone and message.”

"When will they learn that it’s not matter that defines a being? It’s the reflections of the lessons they leave."

— Alex Moore, "Reflections of Lessons Left"

== Track listing ==
All tracks are written by Alex Moore, Scott Concepcion, Matt Murphy and Ryan Durrans.

No.	Title	Length
1.	"Leave No Stone Unturned"	2:55
2.	"Reflections of Lessons Left"	3:56
3.	"Stellar Cast"	3:14
4.	"Heartbreaker"	3:28
5.	"Dynamite"	3:29
6.	"Unrequited Love"	3:28
7.	"No Direction"	3:11
8.	"Until Our Bitter End"	3:23
9.	"Knocking at Your Door"	3:16
10.	"The Jester"	3:26
11.	"Surrounded By Beauty"	3:54
12.	"Long Shadows"	4:55
Total length:		42:35

Acoustic edition bonus disc
No.	Title	Length
1.	"Leave No Stone Unturned" (acoustic)	3:03
2.	"Reflections of Lessons Left" (acoustic)	4:39
3.	"Stellar Cast" (acoustic)	3:40
4.	"Heartbreaker" (acoustic)	2:59
5.	"Dynamite" (acoustic)	3:06
6.	"Unrequited Love" (acoustic)	3:42
7.	"No Direction" (acoustic)	4:16
8.	"Until Our Bitter End" (acoustic)	3:40
9.	"Knocking at Your Door" (acoustic)	4:11
10.	"The Jester" (acoustic)	3:49
11.	"Surrounded By Beauty" (acoustic)	3:04
12.	"Long Shadows" (acoustic)	5:04
Total length:		1:27:57

Live From Robin Park Edition bonus disc
No.	Title	Writer(s)	Length
1.	"No Direction" (Live from Robin Park)	Scott Concepcion; Ryan Durrans; Alex Moore; Matty Murphy; John Kettle	3:58
2.	"Knotted Bed Of Roses" (Live from Robin Park)	Concepcion; Durrans; Moore; Murphy	3:26
3.	"Foolish Parley" (Live from Robin Park)	Concepcion; Johnny Cunliffe; Durrans; Moore	4:22
4.	"The Great Escape" (Live from Robin Park)	Concepcion; Cunliffe; Durrans; Moore	4:33
5.	"Struggle" (Live from Robin Park)	Concepcion; Durrans; Moore; Murphy; Kettle	5:44
6.	"How Beautiful Life Can Be" (Live from Robin Park)	Concepcion; Cunliffe; Durrans; Moore	4:30
7.	"Simple As This" (with Jake Bugg; Live from Robin Park)	Jake Bugg; Matt Prime	4:40
8.	"You Are My Sunshine" (Live from Robin Park)	Disputed	1:20
9.	"All My Life" (Live from Robin Park)	Concepcion; Cunliffe; Durrans; Moore	4:26
10.	"Fight On" (Live from Robin Park)	Concepcion; Cunliffe; Durrans; Moore	3:32
11.	"I See Your Ghost" (Live from Robin Park)	Concepcion; Cunliffe; Durrans; Moore	3:44
12.	"Sad Face Baby" (Live from Robin Park)	Concepcion; Cunliffe; Durrans; Moore	6:55
Total length:			1:33:51

== Personnel ==
Credits adapted from Tidal.

=== The Lathums ===
- Scott Concepcion – background vocals (tracks 1–6, 8–11), electric guitar (1, 2, 5, 6, 8–12), harpsichord (1, 3, 4), xylophone (3), piano (5, 6, 12)
- Ryan Durrans – drums (all tracks), percussion (tracks 2–6, 8, 9, 11, 12), castanets (3)
- Alex Moore – vocals (all tracks), melodica (track 1)
- Matthew Murphy – bass guitar (all tracks), background vocals (tracks 1–6, 8–12)

=== Additional contributors ===
- Chris Taylor – production, mixing, engineering (all tracks), percussion (tracks 1, 2, 4, 9), keyboards (2, 5, 6), synthesizer (3, 5, 6, 8, 12), organ (6, 12), Mellotron (11)
- John Kettle – production (all tracks), electric guitar (tracks 1–6, 8–12), background vocals (3), synthesizer (4), acoustic guitar (9)
- Graeme Lynch – mastering (tracks 1–6, 8)
- Matt Colton – mastering (track 7)
- Stanley Graham – recording, engineering assistance (tracks 1–8, 10–12)
- Dom Samagaio – recording, engineering assistance (track 9)
- Simon Swarbrick – strings, string arrangement (tracks 6, 9)
- Joe Corby – trumpet (track 11)

== Charts ==
Chart performance for Matter Does Not Define
Chart (2025)	Peak position
Scottish Albums (Official Charts)	2
UK Albums (Official Charts)	3
UK Independent Albums (Official Charts)	1
