= From Nothing to a Little Bit More =

Studio album by The Lathums
- Released: 3 March 2023
- Recorded: 2022
- Genre: Indie rock
- Length: 45:21
- Label: Island
- Producer: Jim Abbiss

The Lathums chronology
How Beautiful Life Can Be (2021)	From Nothing to a Little Bit More (2023)	Matter Does Not Define (2025)

Singles from From Nothing to a Little Bit More
- 1. "Sad Face Baby" Released: 15 April 2022; 2. "Say My Name" Released: 27 October 2022; 3. "Turmoil" Released: 9 December 2022; 4. "Struggle" Released: 20 January 2023

From Nothing to a Little Bit More is the second studio album by English indie rock band The Lathums. It was released on 3 March 2023 through Island. The album reached number one on the UK Albums Chart.

== Background and recording ==
=== Working with Jim Abbiss ===
After releasing their debut record How Beautiful Life Can Be, the band went to work on their next album. After previously working with James Skelly on their debut album, the band chose the idea of bringing on Jim Abbiss as producer, who is known for producing Arctic Monkeys' debut record Whatever People Say I Am, That's What I'm Not & Editors' debut record The Back Room.

=== Johnny Cunliffe's departure ===
During the recording of the album, Johnny Cunliffe had left the band. This would be the last album to feature him on bass. The band posted a statement about his departure later on during the summer, with no real reason given. He would be replaced by Matty Murphy. He joined the band on bass guitar but he wasn't dubbed as an official member until later on down the line.

== Promotion and release ==
The album was announced on 27 October 2022, accompanied by the release of the single "Say My Name". The band referred to the album as an "act of rebellion having seen the rules of the game". A 10-date UK tour promoting the record was announced the same day.

The band promoted the album by doing a record store tour, with the group playing shows in record stores around the UK. This tour ran from 15 May, all the way to 30 May. They made an appearance on Sunday Brunch on Channel 4, performing their single, Struggle.

The album released on 3 March 2023 on both streaming services and on physical formats. Later down the line, the band released an extended edition, with live versions of some of the songs and bonus tracks, featuring Matty Murphy on bass for the first time.

== Critical reception ==
Professional ratings
Review scores
Source	Rating
Clash	8/10
Far Out	3.5/5 stars
Gigwise	7/10 stars
Rolling Stone	4/5 stars
The Telegraph	5/5 stars

The album received better reviews from critics, with The Telegraph being enthused with the album. Emma Harrison, of the Telegraph, stated that 'it's been one hell of a journey and the band have navigated their way through various difficult emotional experiences which include the breakdown of frontman Alex Moore's first ever serious relationship. Struggle, the melancholy yet hopeful opening track on the album, sets the tone; the band have found salvation in music'. Rolling Stone gave the album a four out of five, with them stating that it's been 'eighteen months after landing a number-one debut record' and saying 'here comes the varied second album from the Wigan trio.' Clash magazine stated that it was full of 'little touches' and 'flourishes' which showcase their maturity.

== Track listing ==
From Nothing to a Little Bit More – Standard edition
No.	Title	Writer(s)	Length
1.	"Struggle"	Scott Concepcion; Ryan Durrans; Alex Moore	3:54
2.	"Say My Name"	Concepcion; Durrans; Moore; John Kettle	3:50
3.	"I Know Pt 1"	Concepcion; Durrans; Moore; Kettle	3:55
4.	"Lucky Bean"	Concepcion; Durrans; Moore	2:52
5.	"Facets"	Concepcion; Durrans; Moore	2:33
6.	"Rise and Fall"	Concepcion; Durrans; Moore; Kettle	4:05
7.	"Sad Face Baby"	Concepcion; Durrans; Moore	4:18
8.	"Turmoil"	Concepcion; Durrans; Moore; Kettle	3:28
9.	"Land and Sky"	Concepcion; Durrans; Moore; Kettle	4:08
10.	"Crying Out"	Concepcion; Durrans; Moore	4:13
11.	"Undeserving"	Concepcion; Durrans; Moore	8:06
Total length:			45:22

From Nothing to a Little Bit More – Extended edition
No.	Title	Writer(s)	Length
12.	"Knotted Bed of Roses"	Concepcion; Durrans; Moore; Matty Murphy; Kettle	2:55
13.	"Humble Beginnings"	Concepcion; Durrans; Moore; Murphy; Kettle	3:13
14.	"Slowly the Wheels Are Turning"	Concepcion; Durrans; Moore; Murphy	3:06
15.	"Chills"	Concepcion; Durrans; Moore; Murphy	2:15
16.	"Say My Name" (Live at Neighbourhood Festival)	Concepcion; Durrans; Moore	4:15
17.	"I Know Pt 1" (Live at Neighbourhood Festival)	Concepcion; Durrans; Moore; Johnny Cunliffe	4:07
18.	"Facets" (Live at Neighbourhood Festival)	Concepcion; Durrans; Moore	2:45
19.	"Sad Face Baby" (Live at Neighbourhood Festival)	Concepcion; Durrans; Moore; Cunliffe	4:22
Total length:			62:20

Notes

- While not credited, Cunliffe plays bass guitar, except for the bonus tracks on the extended edition.

== Personnel ==
The Lathums

- Alex Moore – vocals (all tracks), background vocals (1–11), electric guitar (4, 5, 11, 16–19)
- Scott Concepcion – electric guitar (all tracks); acoustic guitar (1, 3, 4, 6, 7, 9), piano (2), background vocals (3, 6, 9, 11–14), synthesizer (3), organ (5, 11), Wurlitzer electric piano (6, 9), harpsichord (15)
- Ryan Durrans – drums (1–10, 12–19), percussion (1–10)
- Johnny Cunliffe – bass guitar (1–11)

Additional musicians

- Jim Abbiss – programming (1–11), acoustic guitar (2), synthesizer (3)
- Christopher David Hill – cello (2, 3, 8), double bass (8)
- Gillian Maguire – viola (2, 4, 8, 9), violin (2–4, 8, 9)
- Josh Poole – alto saxophone (4)
- John Kettle – electric guitar (4, 6, 13, 14), acoustic guitar (12–15), background vocals (14), bass guitar (14)
- Tom Berry – trombone (4)
- Roland Parsons – trumpet (4)
- Ross Stanley – piano (8)
- Matty Murphy – bass guitar (12, 15–19), background vocals (12–14)
- Chris Taylor – keyboards (13)
- Jake Dorsman – electric guitar (16)

Technical

- Jim Abbiss – production (1–11)
- John Kettle – production (12–15), engineering (13–15), additional engineering (6, 8)
- Chris Taylor – production (12–15); mixing, engineering (12–19)
- John Davis – mastering
- Mark "Spike" Stent – mixing (1, 3, 4)
- Caesar Edmunds – mixing (2, 5–11)
- Edd Hartwell – engineering (1–11)
- Tom Roach – engineering (13)
- Angelica Bjornsson – engineering assistance (1–6, 8–11)
- Harvey Townsend Jones – engineering assistance (7)

== Charts ==
=== Weekly charts ===
Chart performance for From Nothing to a Little Bit More
Chart (2023)	Peak position
Scottish Albums (OCC)	2
UK Albums (OCC)	1

=== Year-end charts ===
Year-end chart performance for From Nothing to a Little Bit More
Chart (2023)	Position
UK Cassette Albums (OCC)	14
