= Sea of Mirrors =

Studio album by The Coral
- Released: 8 September 2023
- Studio: Parr Street Studios, Liverpool
- Length: 36:48
- Label: Run On; Modern Sky UK
- Producer: Sean O'Hagan

The Coral chronology
Coral Island (2021)	Sea of Mirrors (2023)	Holy Joe's Coral Island Medicine Show (2023)

Singles from Coral Island
- 1. "Wild Bird" Released: 24 May 2023; 2. "Oceans Apart" Released: 29 June 2023; 3. "That's Where She Belongs" Released: 26 July 2023

Sea of Mirrors is the eleventh studio album by English rock band the Coral. It was released on 8 September 2023 through Run On and Modern Sky. The album was produced by Sean O'Hagan and features guest appearances by former member Bill Ryder-Jones, Cilian Murphy, John Simm and Love guitarist Johnny Echols.

== Background and composition ==
Following the critical success of their 2021 double album Coral Island, the band was invited to record at Parr Street Studios in Liverpool for a final time before it was sold. By the time it was being closed, they realised that they had created material worth of two different albums, thematically. While one of them was "telling a story", the other felt more "dream-like", akin to a "stream-of-consciousness" type of writing. As a result, Sea of Mirrors was released alongside another studio album titled Holy Joe's Coral Island Medicine, which was only released physically, not digitally. The band announced both releases on 24 May 2023. The Coral thought of Sea of Mirrors as a "kind of imaginary soundtrack to a 'lost' Spaghetti Western", citing the late composer Ennio Morricone as a main influence. The sound was described as Country rock through a "psychedelic lens". In addition, the vibe of the record gives off "a sun-baked Morricone-esque flair" combined with the band's "signature merseyside sound". Sea of Mirrors is seen as an attempt at crafting their own "surreal gun-slinging soundtrack".

== Singles ==
The lead single "Wild Bird" was released on 24 May, a song with "cinematic aspects" and a "thirst for melody". Lead singer James Skelly commented that once the album concept had been figured out, the song was written in about "five minutes", an imagining of a theme song for an Italian western "directed by Fellini with a Richard Yates-written script". The second single and closing track of the album, "Oceans Apart", was released on 29 June, featuring a vocal cameo by actor Cilian Murphy, who is also fan of the band. The collaboration was suggested by producer Sean O'Hagan. Skelly revealed that the idea behind the song came from internal questions like "Where is my life?" or "How did I get here?". A third single, "That's Where She Belongs", came out on 26 July. The song blends "subtle psych-pop aspects" with a familiar "folksy" sound. Skelly uncovered that he tried to capture the "beauty of the summer" with the song, using "some old tricks" in the process of the creating it.

== Critical reception ==
Professional ratings
Aggregate scores
Source	Rating
Metacritic	81/100
Review scores
Source	Rating
Uncut	7/10

Sea of Mirrors received a score of 81 out of 100 on review aggregator Metacritic based on five critics' reviews, indicating "generally favorable" reception. Uncut wrote that it "confirm[s] the band's Merseyside-'67 LA space-time portal, retracing familiar if melodically firm ground".

== Track listing ==
Sea of Mirrors track listing
No.	Title	Length
1.	"The Actor and the Cardboard Cowboy"	1:10
2.	"Cycles of the Seasons"	2:54
3.	"Faraway Worlds"	3:51
4.	"Wild Bird"	3:12
5.	"North Wind"	3:32
6.	"Eleanor"	0:57
7.	"Sea of Mirrors"	3:09
8.	"That's Where She Belongs"	3:24
9.	"The Way You Are"	2:37
10.	"Dream River"	3:05
11.	"Almeria"	0:29
12.	"Child of the Moon"	3:10
13.	"Oceans Apart"	5:12
Total length:		36:48

== Charts ==
Chart performance for Sea of Mirrors
Chart (2023)	Peak position
Scottish Albums (OCC)	2
UK Albums (OCC)	3
