= Coral Island (album) =

Studio album by The Coral
- Released: 30 April 2021
- Recorded: 2019–2020
- Studio: Parr Street, Liverpool; Ian Murrary's house, Merseyside
- Genre: Psychedelic folk
- Length: 25:43 (Part 1); 28:21 (Part 2); 54:04 (total)
- Label: Run On, Modern Sky UK
- Producer: The Coral, Chris Taylor

The Coral chronology
Move Through the Dawn (2018)	Coral Island (2021)	Sea of Mirrors (2023)

Singles from Coral Island
- 1. "Faceless Angel" Released: 28 January 2021; 2. "Lover Undiscovered" Released: 18 March 2021; 3. "Vacancy" Released: 15 April 2021

Coral Island is the tenth studio album by English rock band the Coral. Run On Records and Modern Sky UK released it on 30 April 2021. During the cycle for their ninth studio album Move Through the Dawn (2018), the band began stockpiling song ideas; on the way home from Blackpool, the band had the idea of making a concept album about a fictional town. With the assistance of Edwin Burdis, the band began mapping out the album. The recording sessions were held at Parr Street Studios in Liverpool, with the narration recorded at Ian Murrary's house in Merseyside; the band and Chris Taylor acted as producers. Described as a psychedelic album, it drew comparison to the Kinks' Village Green Preservation Society (1968), while the narration was reminiscent of that heard on the Small Faces' Ogdens' Nut Gone Flake (1968).

Coral Island received positive reviews from music critics, who praised the high-quality song writing. It reached number two in the UK, and charted in Germany, Scotland, and Switzerland. The album was preceded by the release of three singles: "Faceless Angel" in January 2021, "Lover Undiscovered" in March 2021, and "Vacancy" in April 2021. Coinciding with the album was the publication of a book by keyboardist Nick Power, which provided backstories for each of the characters mentioned on the album.

== Background and production ==
The Coral released their ninth studio album Move Through the Dawn in August 2018. Partway into touring to support it, the band began accumulating potential song ideas for their next album. Frontman James Skelly said the band came up with the idea of a concept album while travelling home from Blackpool, that focused on a fictional coastal town. He added that Coral Island allowed the band's ideas to coalesce under a banner; "[t]he more we sat on it, the more we were like 'you know, we could make our [version of the Beatles'] White Album'". The band brought in Edwin Burdis to aid in worldbuilding; as he worked in Cardiff, the band wrote characters based on different sections of the album. Skelly became aware of Burdis through his brother, who met Burdis at an Arctic Monkeys show. Skelly and Burdis initially talked about making a music video until the topic of Coral Island came up. Burdis built a model of the island, which inspired the band; Skelly attributed the model to "Ray Harryhausen [...] crossed with Llandudno".

The band recorded Coral Island at Parr Street Studios in Liverpool, which is owned and operated by Skelly; the band and Chris Taylor acted as producers while handling the recording. Taylor and Richard Turvey, who had worked on the band's previous releases, recorded "Change Your Mind" and "Lover Undiscovered". The acoustic performances and drum sections were recorded live-in-the-studio, and built from there; James and Ian Skelly did the majority of the backing tracks for each song. Narration by the brothers' grandfather Ian Murrary was recorded at his house in Merseyside by Liam Power, keyboardist Nick Power's brother. James Skelly said they added "a Space Echo so it sounded echoey and strange". In contrast to previous albums, each member of the band arrived at the studio at different times and worked on material separately, sometimes playing different instruments than what they were familiar with. The sessions lasted throughout most of 2019; the Coral and Taylor mixed the recordings, before Joe LaPorta mastered the album at Sterling Sound in New Jersey.

== Composition and lyrics ==
=== Overview ===
Musically, Coral Island's sound has been described as psychedelic folk, with elements of indie and pop, and compared to the Kinks' Village Green Preservation Society (1968). They added their childhoods and a documentary on The River (1980) by Bruce Springsteen inspired it. Coral Island was planned initially as two albums. These were eventually combined as a double album split into the Welcome to Coral Island and The Ghost of Coral Island discs. Skelly said they aimed to release two albums with a three-month gap in-between until Noel Gallagher suggested otherwise: "I went to see Noel's studio and I was telling him about it. He said, 'Why don't you just put it out as one album? You're over-thinking it. Fuck streaming'." The first disc centres around the coastal town's carefree success, with faster tracks aiming to emulate the atmosphere of jukeboxes and arcades. The second disc is focused on individual characters as the town is in seasonal decline. Skelly said many of the tracks were written two days prior to them being recorded.

Throughout Coral Island, Murrary is heard narrating under the guise of The Great Muriarty. Written by Power, the narration has been compared to the one heard in Ogdens' Nut Gone Flake (1968) by the Small Faces. Skelly said it was directly influenced by Ogdens as that was "one of my favourite albums ever [...] but [we've] taken [our narration] to another level", alongside poets such as Jack Kerouac, Rod McKuen and Dylan Thomas. He suggested asking spiritual medium Derek Acorah, actor Cillian Murphy, boxing champion John Conteh, or comedian Tom O'Connor to do it, until "Ian [Skelly] was like, 'we should get grandad'". James Skelly added that as Coral Island was "a world of end-of-the-pier day drinkers, kids who get where they shouldn't," and other characters, it "seemed to call for a tour guide of some kind". Films such as The Shining (1980), The Wicker Man (2006), and Suspiria (2018) influenced some of the album's darkest tracks. Several family members and long-time collaborators contributed to the recordings: Phil McKinnell played slide guitar on "Pavillions of the Mind" and "Take Me Back to the Summertime", and guitar on "The Ghost of Coral Island"; Jack Prince provided a shaker on "Lover Undiscovered"; Fiona Skelly and Niamh Rowe sang backing vocals on "Faceless Angel", "Watch You Disappear" and "Last Night at the Borders"; and Taylor added the stylophone on "Watch You Disappear".

=== Tracks ===
The opening track of disc one, "Welcome to Coral Island", is a short, 54-second long spoken word song that informs the listener about Coral Island, complete with the sounds of crashing waves and seagulls. "Lover Undiscovered" is a guitar pop track, with a soft rock atmosphere and touches of psychedelia. The track talks about rediscovering something that one takes for granted; it was the first song written for the album and originally had different lyrics and a slower tempo. The song's opening line "She wakes up" represents the island starting its day, which Skelly intended as "the beginning of something – a lover undiscovered". The La's-esque guitarwork of "Change Your Mind" is reminiscent of the works of Teenage Fanclub. "Mist on the River" is a ballad that recalls the sound of the band's second studio album Magic and Medicine (2003); the vocals have been compared to Crosby, Stills and Nash.

== Release ==
The Coral supported the Courteeners for a one-off show in November 2019, and Supergrass on their UK tour in March 2020. The band had finished working on Coral Island prior to the COVID-19 lockdowns and had postponed the release because of it; Power theorised that it would have come out around September 2020 had the pandemic not happened. In the interim, Ian Skelly released the solo album Drifter's Skyline in June 2020, while Molloy released his album The Fifth Dandelion a few months later. That same year, the band released Lockdown Sessions, an album of acoustic music that had been recorded at home during the lockdowns. Some outtakes from the Coral Island sessions were released on Lockdown Sessions as they did not fit the album's theme. During the lockdowns, James Skelly spent his time producing albums for acts such as the Blossoms and the Lathums. "Faceless Angel" was released as the lead single on 28 January 2021. Burdis directed the song's music video, which features a fairground. Coinciding with this, Coral Island was announced for release in three months' time.

"Lover Undiscovered" was released as the second single on 18 March 2021; Burdis also directed this song's music video. Skelly said it had "a lot of psychedelic colors, which are meant to represent spring and summer". "Vacancy" was released as the third single on 15 April 2021; a lyric video was released with it. Run On Records and Modern Sky UK released Coral Island on 30 April 2021. Power wrote a book to help guide the listener through the album, which he worked on during the end of the touring cycle for Move Through the Dawn. Power explained it featured short stories about each of the characters mentioned throughout the album; he considered it "a mixture between old Coney Island stuff mixed with [film] Brighton Rock, British seaside literature, comic books, in that classic tradition but with more of a modern take on it". A music video was released for "Change Your Mind" on 30 June 2021, directed by John Eaton.

== Reception ==
Professional ratings
Aggregate scores
Source	Rating
AnyDecentMusic?	8.1/10
Metacritic	85/100
Review scores
Source	Rating
The Arts Desk	4/5 stars
Clash	9/10
Classic Rock	8/10 stars
Gigwise	8/10 stars
Louder Than War	4.5/5 stars
Mojo	4/5 stars
NME	4/5 stars
Record Collector	4/5 stars
The Telegraph	4/5 stars
Uncut	7/10

Coral Island was met with universal acclaim from music critics. At Metacritic, which assigns a normalized rating out of 100 to reviews from mainstream publications, the album received an average score of 85, based on 10 reviews. AnyDecentMusic? gave it a score of 8.1, based on 11 reviews.

Louder Than War reviewer Nathan Whittle called the album a "triumph, from start to finish", with the band having made "what could well be their opus". Across the 24 songs, Whittle singled out 15 of them that were "amongst some of their best work". Clash writer Robin Murray saw it as an "extraordinary piece of world building [... that] never once wavers in quality", with a "natural flow, one that holds your attention even at the record's most sonically obtuse moments". Rhys Buchanan of NME wrote that it was a "bold move" for the Coral to release "something so intricate at this stage of their career", though if the listener immersed themselves in the album, they would be "rewarded with a nostalgic trip that showcases some of their most adventurous writing to date". In his review for The Telegraph, journalist Neil McCormick said the band seemed to be "having fun, and it shows in a carnivalesque cornucopia of strange delights – even if it never quite escapes its contrivances".

Gigwise's Kieran Macadie compared Coral Island to the Beatles' White Album in that "[b]oth records are an expansive, epic collection of tracks crammed with fresh ideas and astonishing heights of creativity". Macadie commented that the spoken word tracks affect the album's tempo, causing it to be "slower paced than it probably should be". The Arts Desk journalist Nick Hasted wrote that, "Merseyside rock's taste for glowing lysergic locales defines" the album; "[w]hat gives blood and muscle to the conceit" is the band's "abiding pop craft". Jim Wirth of Uncut said that the album "splatters familiar components over a broad canvas," and while an "occasional change of pace might be welcome," the "craftsmanship is beyond reproach". Record Collector reviewer Shaun Curran said that there were moments where the band "overstretch – the tail-end of Part One drifts like fish and chip wrapper in the breeze – but a visit to Coral Island elicits the intangible pull of a place in time etched forever in the mind". Stefan Mertlik for laut.de saw it as a "such a mammoth project" that is "convincing because it sounds ambitious, but also accessible".

Coral Island reached number two in the UK, number three in Scotland, number 52 in Germany, and number 60 in Switzerland. Mojo included the album at number seven on their list of the best 75 albums of the year.

== Track listing ==
Writing credits per booklet.

Disc one – Welcome to Coral Island
No.	Title	Writer(s)	Length
1.	"Welcome to Coral Island"	James Skelly; Nick Power	0:54
2.	"Lover Undiscovered"	J. Skelly	3:29
3.	"Change Your Mind"	J. Skelly; Rich Turvey	3:07
4.	"Mist on the River"	J. Skelly	3:35
5.	"Pavillions of the Mind"	Power; Paul Duffy	1:21
6.	"Vacancy"	J. Skelly; Power	2:43
7.	"My Best Friend"	J. Skelly; Power	2:33
8.	"Arcade Hallucinations"	Power	0:32
9.	"The Game She Plays"	J. Skelly	3:22
10.	"Autumn Has Come"	J. Skelly	3:00
11.	"The End of the Pier"	Power	1:07
Total length:			25:43

Disc two – The Ghost of Coral Island
No.	Title	Writer(s)	Length
1.	"The Ghost of Coral Island"	Power; Ian Skelly; Duffy; Phil McKinnell	1:04
2.	"Golden Age"	J. Skelly; I. Skelly	2:41
3.	"Faceless Angel"	J. Skelly	3:26
4.	"The Great Lafayette"	Power	1:09
5.	"Strange Illusions"	J. Skelly; Power	3:06
6.	"Take Me Back to the Summertime"	J. Skelly; I. Skelly	3:10
7.	"Telepathic Waltz"	Power; I. Skelly	0:53
8.	"Old Photographs"	J. Skelly; Power	2:21
9.	"Watch You Disappear"	J. Skelly	2:38
10.	"Late Night at the Borders"	Power	0:30
11.	"Land of the Lost"	J. Skelly	3:52
12.	"The Calico Girl"	Paul Molloy	2:42
13.	"The Last Entertainer"	Power	0:49
Total length:			28:21

== Personnel ==
Personnel per booklet.

The Coral

- James Skelly – lead vocals, guitar
- Paul Duffy – bass
- Paul Molloy – guitar, piano
- Nick Power – keyboards
- Ian Skelly – drums

Additional musicians

- Ian Murrary – narration
- Phil McKinnell – slide guitar ("Pavillions of the Mind" and "Take Me Back to the Summertime"), guitar ("The Ghost of Coral Island")
- Jack Prince – shaker ("Lover Undiscovered")
- Fiona Skelly – backing vocals ("Faceless Angel", "Watch You Disappear" and "Last Night at the Borders")
- Niamh Rowe – backing vocals ("Faceless Angel", "Watch You Disappear" and "Last Night at the Borders")
- Chris Taylor – stylophone ("Watch You Disappear")

Production and design

- The Coral – producer, recording (all except "Change Your Mind" and "Lover Underdiscovered"), mixing
- Chris Taylor – producer, recording, mixing
- Richard Turvey – recording ("Change Your Mind" and "Lover Underdiscovered")
- Liam Power – narration recording
- Joe LaPorta – mastering
- Edwin Burdis – artwork
- Gabriella Jackson – photography
- Simon Cardwell – band photo
- Mark El-khatib – design

== Charts ==
Chart performance for Coral Island
Chart (2021)	Peak position
German Albums (Offizielle Top 100)	52
Irish Albums (IRMA)	62
Scottish Albums (OCC)	3
Swiss Albums (Schweizer Hitparade)	60
UK Albums (OCC)	2
UK Independent Albums (OCC)	1
