= How Beautiful Life Can Be =

Studio album by The Lathums
- Released: 24 September 2021
- Recorded: 2019–2021
- Genre: Indie rock
- Length: 39:00
- Label: Island
- Producer: James Skelly

The Lathums chronology
How Beautiful Life Can Be (2021)	From Nothing to a Little Bit More (2023)

Singles from How Beautiful Life Can Be
- 1. "Oh My Love" Released: 9 April 2021; 2. "How Beautiful Life Can Be" Released: 14 July 2021; 3. "The Great Escape" Released: 30 July 2021; 4. "I'll Get By" Released: 11 August 2021

How Beautiful Life Can Be is the debut studio album by the English indie rock band the Lathums, released on 24 September 2021 by record label Island Records. The album debuted at number one on the UK Albums Chart on 1 October 2021.

== Title and background ==
The title of the album came from the fourth track on the album, which was inspired by Moore's mother, Anne. According to Moore, he told her to 'stop talking' and to 'hold onto those thoughts for one second'. He went to grab his guitar and began writing the song, which would later be fitted onto the track listing on the album.

The band's producer, the Coral's James Skelly, helped create the album, which featured some of the band's singles from 2019 and 2021. He also helped produce new songs that would appear on their debut album. Alex Moore mentioned in an interview on Radio X that during the lockdown, where they were able to socially distance from one another, they started playing the song "Circles of Faith", which they decided would be the opening track for their debut album. It was the first song recorded for How Beautiful Life Can Be. The track listing consists of some previously released songs and brand new songs recorded for the album. One track that was omitted from the list was All My Life, which Skelly had recorded, prior to the album's release.

== Release ==
The album was released on 24 September 2021 by the label Island Records.

Three days after the release date, an extended edition was released exclusively to Apple Music, with previously released songs. A month later, the band released a deluxe version of the album, with each track getting an acoustic rendition, while the title track had an acapella version.

How Beautiful Life Can Be peaked at number one in the UK Albums Chart. The album has been certified Silver in the UK on 22 March 2024, three years after the album's initial release date.

== Critical reception ==
How Beautiful Life Can Be received generally positive reviews from British Media Outlets. NME was quite enthralled with this album, giving it four out of five stars, with Damien Jones stating, "It's been quite a year for them during the pandemic". Jones also stated that it was 'a shame the band omitted rousing early anthem and live centrepiece ‘All My Life’ from the record due to “there literally being no room for it”.' He stated that it was easily one of their strongest tracks, but the fact they can leave it out and still succeed is testament to an album that brims with hope and heartbreak.

Professional ratings
Aggregate scores
Source	Rating
Metacritic	72/100
Review scores
Source	Rating
The Guardian	3/5 stars
NME	4/5 stars
Louder Than War	3.5/5
The Telegraph	3.5/5 stars

The Guardian gave the three out of five stars stating that "Its retro sensibility and guileless tone means How Beautiful Life Can Be is the guitar music equivalent of comfort food: undemanding, slightly stupefying, but immensely cheering all the same". On Metacritic, it received an average score of 72, with four positive reviews and two mixed reviews.

The Telegraph gave the album "three and a half out of five", stating that the band 'truly aspire to be the indie voice of a new generation, they are going to have to sharpen their quills or invest in a rhyming dictionary'. Louder Than War also had similar views as the Telegraph, with their outlet saying, "The Lathums are going from strength to strength now that they can get out there and play live again. Their debut album is a strong statement of the potential that they have to grow, the avenues they have to explore. For now, though, they’re just happy to finally be given the opportunity to fly once again."

== Track listing ==
All tracks are written by Moore, Concepcion, Cunliffe and Durrans, unless noted otherwise.

Track listing
No.	Title	Length
1.	"Circles of Faith"	3:30
2.	"I'll Get By"	2:31
3.	"Fight On"	2:49
4.	"How Beautiful Life Can Be"	2:47
5.	"The Great Escape"	3:49
6.	"I Won't Lie"	2:51
7.	"I See Your Ghost"	2:33
8.	"Oh My Love"	2:23
9.	"I'll Never Forget the Time I Spent with You"	3:14
10.	"I Know That Much"	3:22
11.	"Artificial Screens"	5:15
12.	"The Redemption of Sonic Beauty"	3:57
Total length:		39:01

How Beautiful Life Can B-Sides track listing
No.	Title	Writer(s)	Length
1.	"Pagans Delight"		2:27
2.	"Winstanley Manor"		3:39
3.	"Wickerman"		2:56
4.	"Up The Junction"	Chris Difford; Glenn Tilbrook	3:03
5.	"This Place O' Yours"		3:46
6.	"Crying Out"	Moore	4:20
7.	"Pagans Delight" (Acoustic)		2:22
Total length:			22:37

== Personnel ==
The Lathums

- Alex Moore – lead vocals, guitar
- Scott Concepcion – guitar, backing vocals, piano ^{(12)}
- Johnny Cunliffe – bass guitar
- Ryan Durrans – drums

Production

- John Davis - Mastering ^{(All tracks except 8)}
- Robin Schmidt - Mastering ^{(8)}
- Caesar Edmunds - Mixing
- James Skelly - Production

== Charts ==
Chart performance for How Beautiful Life Can Be
Chart (2021)	Peak position
Irish Albums (IRMA)	71
Scottish Albums (OCC)	1
UK Albums (OCC)	1

== Certifications ==
Region	Certification	Certified units/sales
United Kingdom (BPI)	Silver	60,000^{‡}
^{‡} Sales+streaming figures based on certification alone.
