= The Lathums =

British indie band

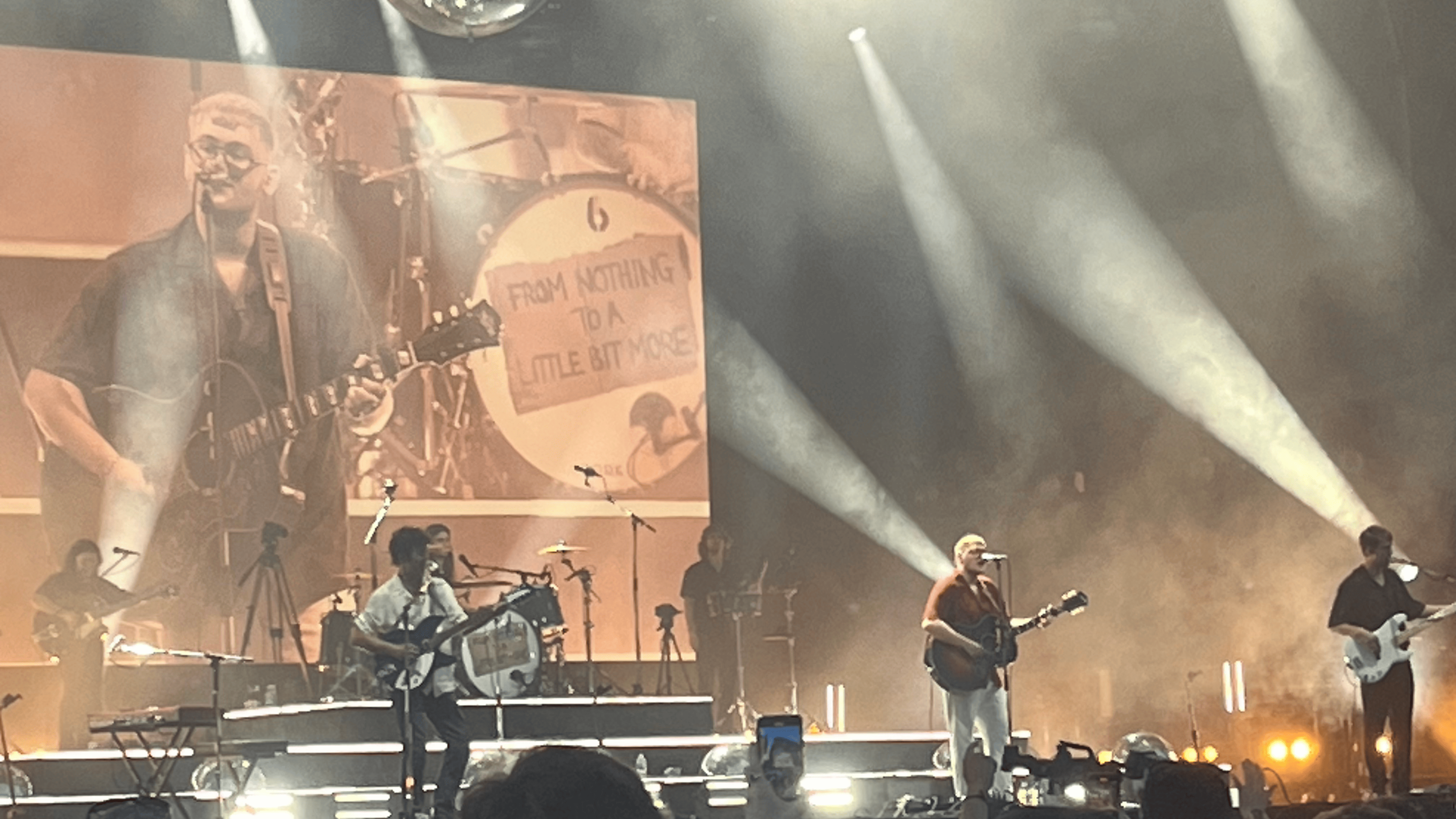
- The Lathums performing at Robin Park Arena in 2024

Background information
- Origin: Wigan, Greater Manchester, England
- Genre: Indie rock
- Years active: 2018–present
- Labels: Modern Sky; Island
- Members: Alex Moore; Scott Concepcion; Ryan Durrans; Matty Murphy
- Past members: Lewis Halliwell: Johnny Cunliffe
- Website: thelathums.com

The Lathums (/læθʌmz/) are an English indie rock band from Wigan, Greater Manchester. They are formed of singer/songwriter and guitarist Alex Moore, lead guitarist Scott Concepcion, bassist Matty Murphy and drummer Ryan Durrans, and are managed by Alfie Skelly. They were created by The Music Project, a stage school specialising in music, art, games and media, in April 2018 after their tutor placed them in the same project group, and within a year they signed with Island Records. They released their debut album, How Beautiful Life Can Be, on 24 September 2021. It debuted at number one on the UK Albums Chart on 1 October 2021.

== History ==
=== 2018–2019: Formation ===
Alex Moore, frontman of the band, first met Scott Concepcion before the band formed. The band began as a music project at college in Pemberton, Greater Manchester. The members consisted of drummer Ryan Durrans, bassist Lewis Halliwell, guitarist Scott Concepcion and singer Alex Moore. The band are named after a venue that they performed at. It's commonly pronounced as "La-thums", rather than "Lay-thums". When asked how it's pronounced, Moore stated, "It's just how we pronounce it. It's just how it was christened." Halliwell later left the band and brought on Johnny Cunliffe to replace him.

In 2018, the band wrote their first song together, "Artificial Screens", which they would self-release, along with other singles that would be re-released and remastered later down the line. In April 2019, the band released their first official single, "Crying Out". It was recorded by John Kettle and then later released as a single. Later on, the band released another single, "The Great Escape". This garnered the attention of Tim Burgess from the Charlatans. He invited the band to play a set at Kendal Calling.

=== 2020–2021: COVID-19 and How Beautiful Life Can Be ===
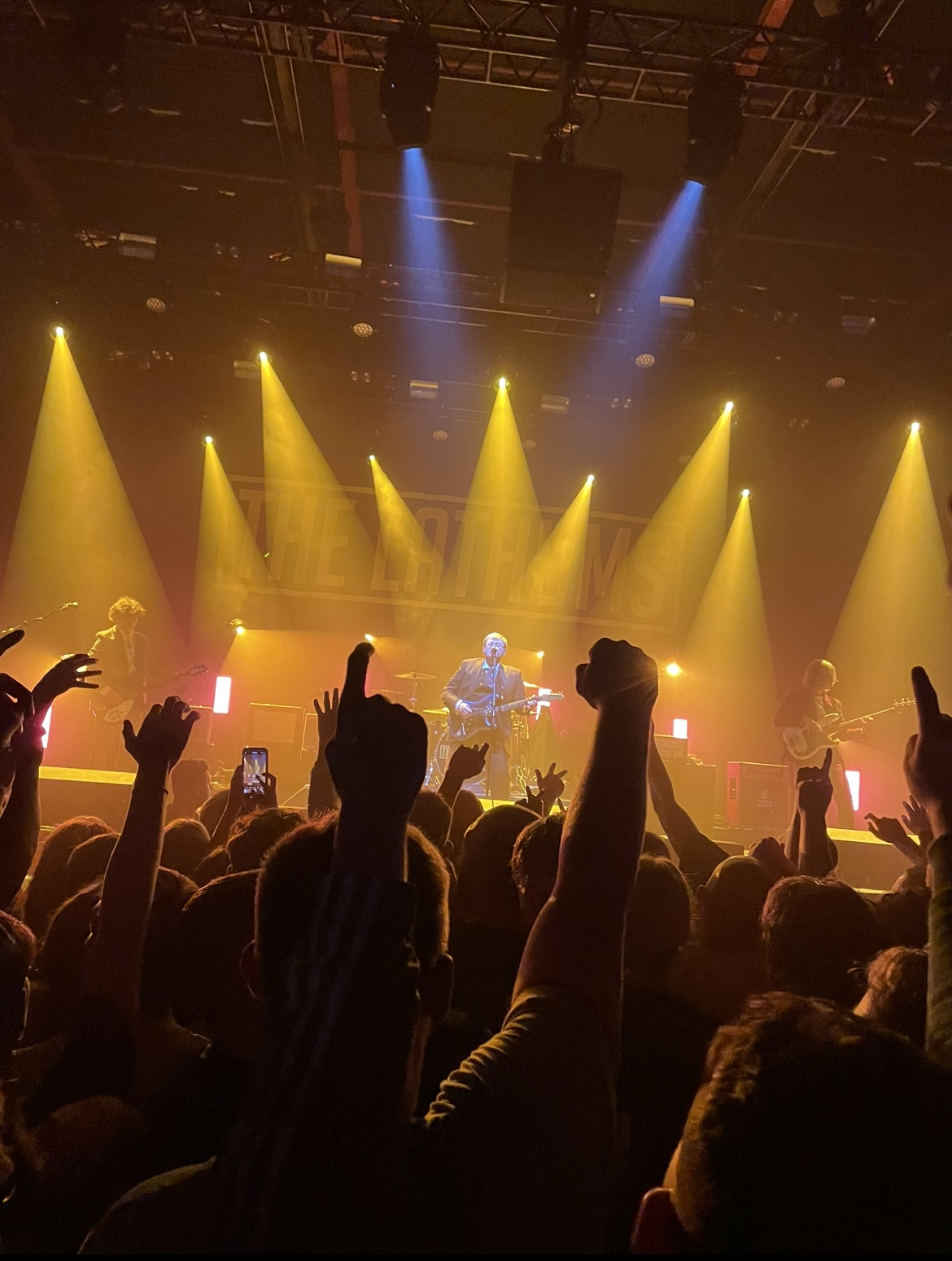
The Lathums performing at Victoria Warehouse in 2021

The Lathums were signed to Island Records in March 2020. The band were set as support acts for Paul Weller and Blossoms, but they were postponed due to the COVID-19 pandemic. During the COVID-19 lockdowns, the band released "All My Life" in July, an acoustic ballad, written by a 16-year-old Moore. It was produced by the Coral's James Skelly at Liverpool's Parr Street Studio.

In September 2021, the band released their debut album, How Beautiful Life Can Be, which featured remastered versions of previously released singles, alongside new songs.

=== 2022–2024: Cunliffe's departure and From Nothing to a Little Bit More ===
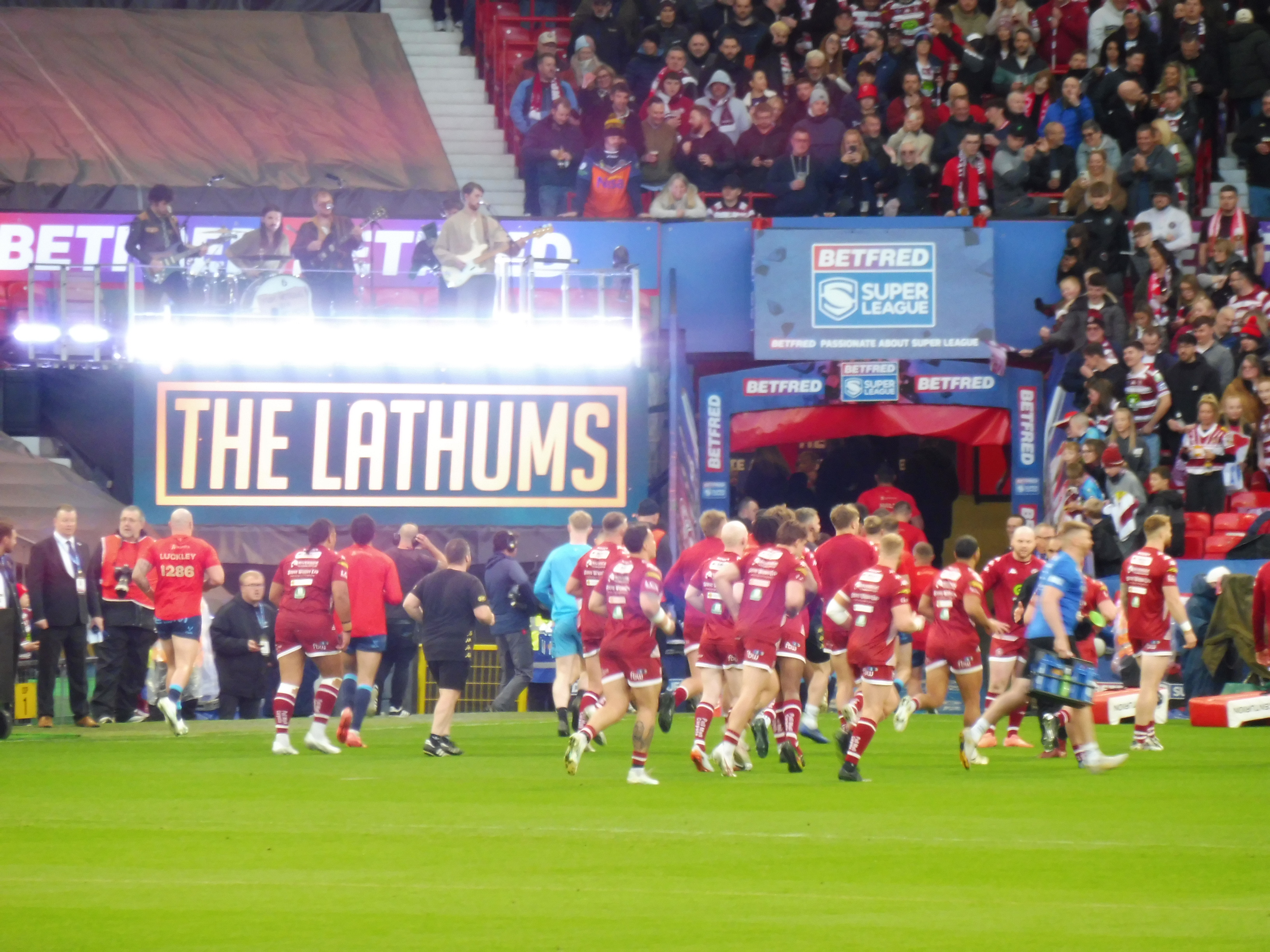
The Lathums performing pre-match at Old Trafford during the 2024 Super League Grand Final

In April 2022, the band released Sad Face Baby, the last single to feature Johnny Cunliffe on bass before his departure in 2022. Cunliffe has not publicly spoken since his departure, nor has the band directly mentioned him. The band brought on Matty Murphy as a replacement but was not officially dubbed as a member until January 2023. During the time of Cunliffe's absence, the band were a support act for The Killers. Moore got the chance to do a cover of How Beautiful Life Can Be with them on stage, with Alex on acoustic guitar and Brandon Flowers on co-lead vocals.

In November 2022, the band announced their second album, From Nothing to a Little Bit More. Following the announcement, "Say My Name" and "Turmoil" were released.

In December 2022, "Say My Name" was named the Radio X Record of the Year.

In January 2023, they released the single "Struggle." On 16 February they performed in Warrington ahead of the opening round of the Betfred Super League, Warrington Wolves vs Leeds Rhinos.

In June 2023, The Lathums made their debut on the Other Stage at Worthy Farm, Glastonbury Festival for a 45-minute set with the crowd getting bigger as each song was played.

The Lathums announced in December of 2023 that they would be playing a gig in the hometown, Wigan, accompanied by Jake Bugg, Brooke Combe, and Alex Spencer on 19 July 2024. The gig was held at Robin Park Arena and alongside the band playing there, James Arthur, Noel Gallagher's High Flying Birds and Richard Ashcroft of The Verve would be playing there during the same week. During the performance for the band, Moore was joined by Jake Bugg and covered Bugg's 'Simple as This'.

=== 2025-present: Matter Does Not Define ===
On 30 October, the band announced their forthcoming third album, Matter Does Not Define, with a single to coincide with the announcement, Stellar Cast. The band toured the album from March 2025 to April 2025.

== Band members ==
Current members

- Alex Moore – lead vocals, guitar (2018–present)
- Scott Concepcion – guitar, piano, backing vocals (2018–present)
- Ryan Durrans – drums (2018–present)
- Matty Murphy – bass guitar, backing vocals (2023–present; touring member 2022)

Former members

- Johnny Cunliffe – bass guitar (2018–2022)
- Lewis Halliwell – bass guitar (2018)

Current touring musicians

- Ryan Ellis – guitar (2023–present)

Former touring musicians

- Will Watts – bass guitar (2022)
- Jake Dorsman – guitar (2022)
- Charlie Salt – bass guitar (2026, substitute for Matty Murphy)

== Discography ==
=== Studio albums ===
List of studio albums, with selected details and chart positions
Title	Details	Peak chart positions	
Title	Details	UK	IRE
How Beautiful Life Can Be	Released: 24 September 2021; Label: Island; Formats: Digital Download, CD, 12" Vinyl, Cassette, Streaming	1	71
From Nothing to a Little Bit More	Released: 3 March 2023; Label: Island; Formats: Digital Download, CD, 12" Vinyl, Cassette, Streaming	1	—
Matter Does Not Define	Released: 28 February 2025; Label: Modern Sky; Formats: Digital Download, CD, 12" Vinyl, Cassette, Streaming	3	—

=== Live albums ===
Title	Details
Live from Sefton Park	Released: 2 June 2021; Label: Island; Formats: Digital Download, Streaming
Live at Blackpool Tower	Released: 12 June 2021; Label: Island; Formats: Digital Download, 12" Vinyl

=== Extended plays ===
Title	Details
Úp Fûk Lätum	Released: 14 August 2019; Label: Self Released; Formats: Digital Download, CD
The Lathums	Released: 24 September 2019; Label: Modern Sky UK; Formats: Digital Download, Streaming
Fight On	Released: 24 January 2020; Label: Modern Sky UK; Formats: Digital Download, Streaming
The Memories We Make	Released: 26 June 2020; Label: Modern Sky UK; Format: 12" Vinyl
Ghosts	Released: 30 October 2020; Label: Island; Formats: Digital Download, Streaming
How Beautiful Life Can B-Sides	Released: 23 September 2021; Label: Island; Formats: Digital Download, Streaming
Gull In The Wind	Released: 29 January 2026; Label: Modern Sky UK; Formats: Digital Download, Streaming, Ltd. Edition Record Store Day 10" Vinyl

=== Singles ===
Title	Year	Album / EP
"Artificial Screens"	2018	The Lathums
"The Great Escape"	2018	The Lathums
"Villainous Victorian"	2018	The Lathums
"This Place O' Yours"	2019	The Lathums
"Crying Out"	2019	Non-album single
"I Know That Much"	2019	Fight On
"Fight On"	2020	Fight On
"The Snake"	2020	Non-album single
"All My Life"	2020	Ghosts
"I See Your Ghost"	2020	Ghosts
"Oh My Love"	2021	How Beautiful Life Can Be
"How Beautiful Life Can Be"	2021	How Beautiful Life Can Be
"The Great Escape (2021 Master)"	2021	How Beautiful Life Can Be
"I'll Get By"	2021	How Beautiful Life Can Be
"Krampus"	2021	Non-album single
"Sad Face Baby"	2022	From Nothing to a Little Bit More
"Say My Name"	2022	From Nothing to a Little Bit More
"Turmoil"	2022	From Nothing to a Little Bit More
"Struggle"	2023	From Nothing to a Little Bit More
"Thoughts Of a Child"	2023	Non-album single
"No Direction"	2024	Matter Does Not Define
"Stellar Cast"	2024	Matter Does Not Define
"Long Shadows"	2024	Matter Does Not Define
"Heartbreaker"	2025	Matter Does Not Define
"Reflections Of Lessons Left (Acoustic)"	2025	Matter Does Not Define (Acoustic)
"Cobblestones"	2025	Gull In The Wind
"Vice Versa"	2026	TBC
