= The Mysterines =

British rock band

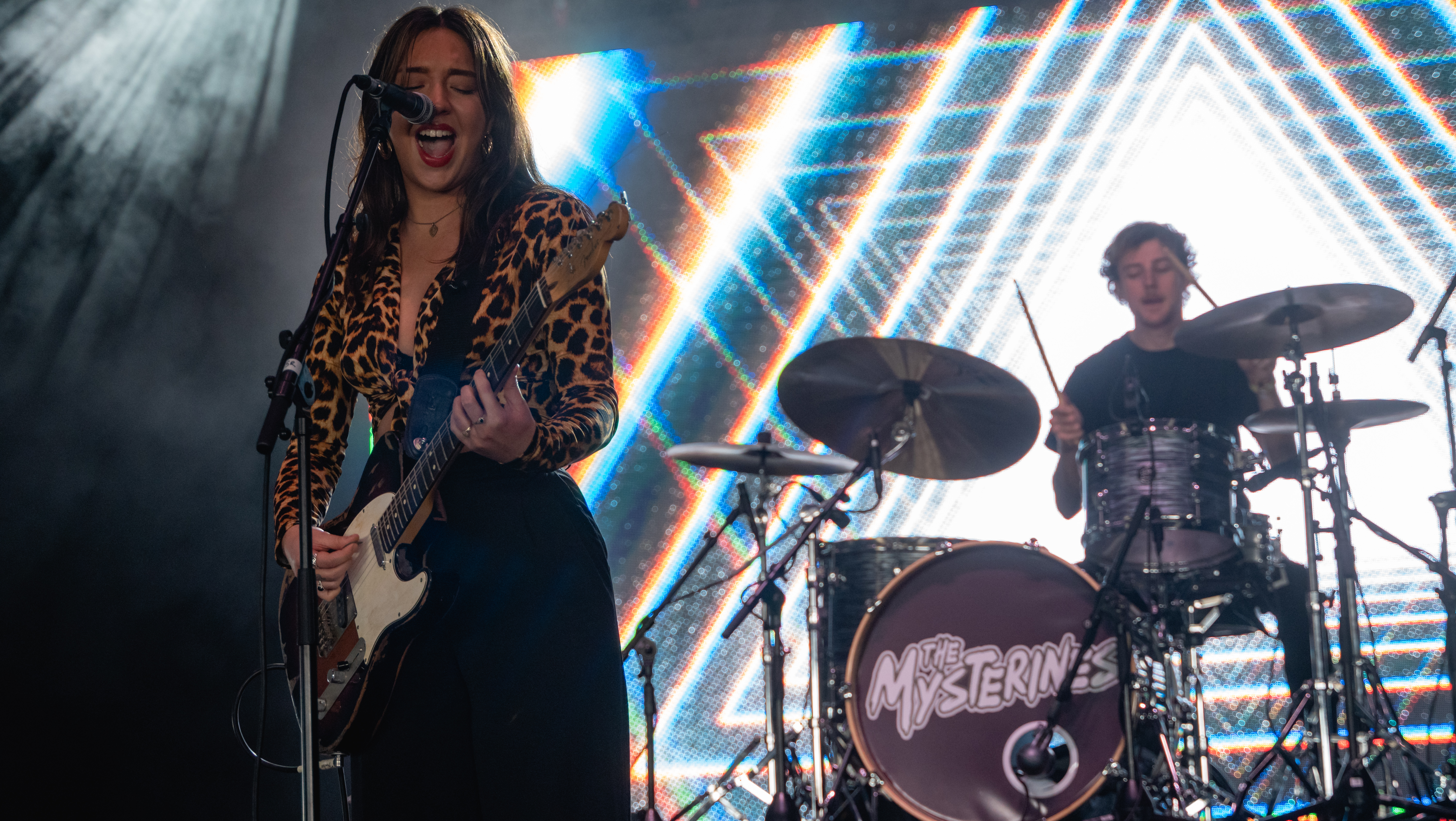
- The Mysterines performing at Boardmasters Festival in Cornwall, England, 2021

Background information
- Origin: Wirral, UK
- Genres: Alternative rock; grunge; garage rock
- Years active: 2015–2024
- Labels: Fiction, Pretty Face
- Members: Lia Metcalfe; George Favager; Callum Thompson; Paul Crilly
- Past members: Chrissy Moore
- Website: www.themysterines.com

The Mysterines were a British alternative rock band from Liverpool and the Wirral composed of Lia Metcalfe (vocals and guitar), George Favager (bass guitar), Callum Thompson (guitar and backing vocals) and Paul Crilly (drums and backing vocals). Their debut album Reeling was released on 11 March 2022 via Fiction Records and charted at number 9 on the UK Albums Chart. Their second album Afraid of Tomorrows, released 21 June 2024, reached number 11 on the UK Albums Chart.

== History ==
The band was formed by vocalist and writer Lia Metcalfe when she met bass player George Favager, both living near each other on the Wirral. The original line-up was a three piece with drummer Chrissy Moore. After Moore left in 2020, the band were augmented by Callum Thompson on guitar and backing vocals with Paul Crilly becoming the band's new drummer.

The band released a total of 7 songs across two EPs on their own Pretty Face Recordings label before signing to Fiction Records in March 2021. They released their debut album, Reeling, produced by Catherine Marks, the following year.

From May to June 2023, the band opened for the Arctic Monkeys during their UK & Ireland Tour. In June 2024, the band released their second studio album, Afraid of Tomorrows, produced by John Congleton. The album represented a shift in their sound and was well-reviewed by critics.

In February 2024, the band announced a headline tour of Europe for 16 dates through October and November 2024. However, on 31 August 2024, the band released a statement on their social media pages announcing the cancellation of all remaining tour dates "due to recent circumstances", explaining "it has been decided that it's not the best decision for us at this time".

== Discography ==
=== Studio albums ===
- Reeling (2022)
- Afraid of Tomorrows (2024)

=== Extended plays ===
- Take Control (2019)
- Love's Not Enough (2020)
- All These Things (2022)

=== Singles ===
- "In My Head" (2021)
- "Hung Up" (2021)
- "The Bad Thing" (2021)
- "Dangerous" (2022)
- "Begin Again" (2023)
- "Stray" (2024)
- "Sink Ya Teeth" (2024)
- "The Last Dance" (2024)
