= Reeling (album) =

Studio album by the Mysterines
- Released: 11 March 2022
- Genres: Grunge, garage rock
- Length: 43:28
- Label: Fiction
- Producer: Catherine Marks

The Mysterines chronology
Love's Not Enough (2020)	Reeling (2022)	All These Things (2022)

Singles from Reeling
- 1. "Love's Not Enough" Released: 5 February 2020; 2. "In My Head" Released: 13 July 2021; 3. "The Bad Thing" Released: 3 December 2021; 4. "Dangerous" Released: 12 January 2022

Reeling is the debut album by British alternative rock band the Mysterines, released 11 March 2022 via Fiction Records.

== Reception ==
Reeling ratings
Aggregate scores
Source	Rating
AnyDecentMusic?	7.5/10
Metacritic	81/100
Review scores
Source	Rating
DIY	3.5/5 stars
Dork	4/5 stars
Gigwise	8/10 stars
The Line of Best Fit	8/10
MusicOMH	3.5/5 stars
NME	4/5 stars

According to the review aggregator Metacritic, Reeling received "universal acclaim" based on a weighted average score of 81 out of 100 from 6 critic scores.

=== Year-end lists ===
Reeling year-end lists
Publication	#	Ref.
Atwood Magazine	—N/a	
Louder Than War	47	

== Track listing ==
All tracks are written by Lia Metcalfe except where noted.

Reeling track listing
No.	Title	Writer(s)	Length
1.	"Life's a Bitch (But I Like It So Much)"	Callum Thompson; Lia Metcalfe	2:50
2.	"Hung Up"	Thompson; Metcalfe	3:24
3.	"Reeling"		3:08
4.	"Old Friends / Die Hard"	Metcalfe; Nick Power	2:18
5.	"Dangerous"	Thompson; Metcalfe	3:31
6.	"On the Run"	Thompson; Metcalfe	2:38
7.	"Under Your Skin"		2:47
8.	"The Bad Thing"		4:24
9.	"In My Head"		3:54
10.	"Means to Bleed"	Thompson; Metcalfe	2:57
11.	"All These Things"	Thompson; Metcalfe	4:29
12.	"Still Call You Home"		2:29
13.	"The Confession Song"		4:32
Total length:			43:28

== Personnel ==
=== Musicians ===
- Lia Metcalfe – vocals, guitar, piano (3, 13), percussion (4, 7, 13)
- Callum Thompson – guitar (1–11, 13), backing vocals (1–7, 9–11)
- George Favager – bass guitar (1–6, 8–11, 13), backing vocals (7)
- Paul Crilly – drums (1–11, 13), percussion (4–7, 10, 11, 13), guitar (4, 11), backing vocals (4, 6, 7, 11, 13)
- Ben Harper – backing vocals (11)
- Matthew Thomson – backing vocals (13)

=== Technical ===
- Catherine Marks – producer, mixing (2–13)
- Richie Kennedy – mixing, recording engineer
- Ben Harper – assistant recording engineer
- John Davis – mastering engineer
- Alan Moulder – mixing (1)
- Tom Herbert – mixing assistant (1)
- Caesar Edmunds – mix engineer (1)

== Charts ==
Chart performance for Reeling
Chart (2022)	Peak position
UK Albums (Official Charts)	9
UK Rock & Metal Albums (Official Charts)	2
