= Crystal Days: 1979–1999 =

Box set by Echo & the Bunnymen
- Released: 17 July 2001
- Recorded: March 1979 – 15 March 1999
- Genre: Post-punk
- Label: Rhino
- Producers: Compilation; Andy Zax; Original Recordings; Lars Aldman, David Balfe, Bill Drummond, Echo & the Bunnymen, Kevin Howlett, Hugh Jones, Laurie Latham, Ray Manzarek, Gil Norton, Alan Perman

Echo & the Bunnymen chronology
Flowers (2001)	Crystal Days: 1979–1999 (2001)	Live in Liverpool (2002)

Professional ratings
Review scores
Source	Rating
Allmusic	4.5/5 stars
Entertainment Weekly	B+

Crystal Days: 1979–1999 is a four CD box set by Echo & the Bunnymen which was released in July 2001. It is a retrospective compilation of the band's work between 1979 and 1999. The first three cds include most of their singles, several album tracks, some alternate mixes, unreleased songs and B-sides published on 7-inch and 12-inch vinyls, plus versions recorded for John Peel sessions on BBC Radio 1. The fourth CD is a live cd with cover versions.

Most of the extra material, consisting of B-sides and alternate mixes, would be later included as bonus tracks on the albums CD reissues of 2003 and 2008.

This retrospective boxset omits the material released when the band was fronted by Noel Burke (1990–92).

== Track listing ==
All tracks written by Ian McCulloch, Will Sergeant, Les Pattinson and Pete de Freitas except where noted.

=== Disc one ===
1. "Monkeys" (McCulloch, Sergeant, Pattinson) (original version) – 3.04
2. "The Pictures on My Wall" (McCulloch, Sergeant, Pattinson) (original single version) – 2.51
3. "Read It in Books" (Julian Cope, McCulloch) (original single version) – 2.59
4. "Villiers Terrace" (John Peel session 15 August 1979) – 4.13
5. "Rescue" – 4.26
6. "Simple Stuff" – 2.35
7. "Stars Are Stars" – 2.47
8. "All That Jazz" – 2.47
9. "Crocodiles" – 2.40
10. "The Puppet" – 3.07
11. "Do It Clean" – 2.48
12. "Show of Strength" −4.56
13. "Over the Wall" – 6.06
14. "A Promise" – 4.04
15. "Heaven Up Here" −3.43
16. "All My Colours" – 4.02
17. "Broke My Neck" (long version) – 7.17
18. "No Hands" (John Peel session 27 January 1982) – 3.11
19. "Fuel" – 4.05
20. "The Subject" – 5.09

=== Disc two ===
1. "The Back of Love" – 3.15
2. "The Cutter" – 3.52
3. "Way Out and Up We Go" – 4.03
4. "Clay" – 4.16
5. "Heads Will Roll" – 3.33
6. "Gods Will Be Gods" (alternate version) – 5.30
7. "Never Stop (Discotheque)" – 4.46
8. "Watch Out Below" (John Peel session 19 September 1983) – 2.50
9. "The Killing Moon" (All Night version) – 9.13
10. "Silver (Tidal Wave)" – 5.12
11. "Angels and Devils" – 4.23
12. "Crystal Days" – 2.26
13. "Seven Seas" – 3.20
14. "My Kingdom" – 4.06
15. "Ocean Rain" – 5.18
16. "All You Need Is Love" (Lennon–McCartney) – 6.42

=== Disc three ===
1. "Bring on the Dancing Horses" – 4.05
2. "Over Your Shoulder" – 4.07
3. "Lover, I Love You" (McCulloch, Sergeant, Pattinson) – 4.20
4. "Satisfaction" (McCulloch, Sergeant, Pattinson) – 4.11
5. "New Direction" (original version) (McCulloch, Sergeant, Pattinson) – 4.23
6. "Ship of Fools" (McCulloch, Sergeant, Pattinson) – 4.04
7. "All My Life" (McCulloch, Sergeant, Pattinson) – 4.10
8. "The Game" (McCulloch, Sergeant, Pattinson) – 3.51
9. "Bedbugs and Ballyhoo" – 3.29
10. "Lips Like Sugar" (single mix) (McCulloch, Sergeant, Pattinson) – 4.37
11. "People Are Strange" (extended version) (Robbie Krieger, Jim Morrison) – 4.32
12. "Rollercoaster" – 4.05
13. "Don't Let It Get You Down" (McCulloch, Sergeant, Pattinson) – 3.52
14. "I Want to Be There (When You Come)" (McCulloch, Sergeant, Pattinson) – 3.39
15. "Nothing Lasts Forever" (McCulloch, Sergeant, Pattinson) – 3.56
16. "Hurracaine" (McCulloch, Sergeant, Pattinson) – 4.21
17. "Rust" (McCulloch, Sergeant, Pattinson) – 5.24
18. "What Are You Going To Do With Your Life?" (McCulloch, Sergeant, Pattinson) – 5.11

=== Disc four ===
1. "In the Midnight Hour" (Steve Cropper, Wilson Pickett) – 3.30
2. "Start Again" (live 6 November 1987) (McCulloch) – 3.26
3. "The Original Cutter – A Drop in the Ocean" – 4.00
4. "Heads Will Roll" (Summer version) – 4.25
5. "Bedbugs and Ballyhoo" (original single version) – 3.38
6. "Zimbo" (live 17 July 1982 with The Royal Burundi Drummers) – 4.57
7. "Angels and Devils" (live 25 April 1985) – 3.04
8. "She Cracked" (live 4/85) (Jonathan Richman) – 2.54
9. "It's All Over Now, Baby Blue" (live 4/85) (Bob Dylan) – 3.33
10. "Soul Kitchen" (live 25 April 1985) (John Densmore, Krieger, Ray Manzarek, Morrison) – 3.50
11. "Action Woman" (live 25 April 1985) (Warren Kendrick) – 3.21
12. "Paint It, Black" (live 25 April 1985) (Jagger/Richards) – 3.15
13. "Run Run Run" (live 25 April 1985) (Lou Reed) – 3.59
14. "Friction" (live 25 April 1985) (Tom Verlaine) – 4.44
15. "Crocodiles" (live 25 April 1985) – 6.06
16. "Heroin" (live 18 July 1983) (Reed) – 5.43
17. "Do It Clean" (live 18 July 1983) – 8.18
18. "The Cutter" (alternate version) – 4.06

== Personnel ==
=== Musicians ===
==== Echo & the Bunnymen ====
- Ian McCulloch – guitar, vocals
- Will Sergeant – guitar, harpsichord, sitar
- Les Pattinson – bass guitar
- Pete de Freitas – drums

==== Other musicians ====
- David Balfe – piano, keyboards
- Jake Brockman – keyboards
- Julian Cope – keyboards
- Liam Gallagher – backing vocals
- Michael K. Lee – drums
- London Metropolitan Orchestra – strings, brass, woodwind
- Ray Manzarek – keyboards
- Mike Mooney – guitar
- Harry Morgan – percussion
- Stephen Morris – drums
- David Palmer – drums
- Leslie Penny – woodwind
- Alan Perman – harpsichord
- Adam Peters – piano, cello, conductor, keyboards
- Guy Pratt – bass guitar
- Henry Priestman – keyboards
- Shankar – strings
- Ed Shearmur – piano
- Jeremy Stacey – drums
- Mark Taylor – keyboards
- Tim Whittaker – percussion
- Paul "Tubbs" Williams – backing vocals

=== Production ===
- Lars Aldman – original recording producer
- Shawn Amos – liner note co-ordination
- Vanessa Atkins – project assistant
- David Balfe – engineer, original recording producer
- Stuart Barry – engineer
- David Bascombe – engineer
- Michael Bergek – engineer
- John Brierly – engineer
- Hugh Brown – art direction
- Emily Cagan – project assistant
- Peter Coleman – engineer
- Pete de Freitas – engineer
- Bill Drummond – original recording producer
- Echo & the Bunnymen – engineer, mixing, original recording producer
- Colin Fairley – engineer
- David Frazer – engineer
- Daniel Goldmark – editorial research
- Paul Gomersall – engineer
- Nick Gomm – engineer
- Rachel Gutek – art direction
- Alex Haas – mixing
- Dan Hersch – remastering
- Kevin Howlett – original recording producer
- Bill Inglot – mixing, remastering, audio production
- Nick Ingman – string arrangements
- Hugh Jones – engineer, original recording producer
- Brian Kehew – mixing
- Bruce Lampcov – mixing
- Laurie Latham – original recording producer
- Henri Loustau – engineer
- David Lord – engineer
- Ray Manzarek – original recording producer
- Guy Massey – engineer
- David McLees – project assistant
- Patrick Milligan – project supervisor
- Martin Mitchell – engineer
- Jo Motta – project assistant
- Chris Nagle – engineer
- Clif Norrell – mixing
- Gil Norton – engineer, mixing, original recording producer
- Alan Perman – original recording producer
- Randy Perry – project assistant
- Adam Peters – string arrangements, orchestral arrangements
- Gary Peterson – discographical annotation
- Steve Riddle – engineer
- Don Rodenbach – mixing
- Alex Scannell – assistant engineer
- Steve Short – engineer
- Mark "Spike" Stent – mixing
- Julee Stover – editorial supervision
- Cenzo Townshend – engineer
- Amy Utstein – project assistant
- Chris Walter – photography
- Richard Woodcraft – mixing
- Dave Woolley – engineer
- Andrea Wright – assistant engineer
- Andy Zax – compilation producer
