= The Stars, the Oceans & the Moon =

Compilation album by Echo & the Bunnymen
- Released: 5 October 2018
- Studios: The Doghouse Studio, Henley on Thames, England, United Kingdom; Plato Studios, London, England, United Kingdom
- Genre: Alternative rock
- Length: 63:44
- Language: English
- Label: BMG
- Producers: Ian McCulloch; Jez Wing

Echo & the Bunnymen chronology
The Killing Moon – The Singles 1980–1990 (2017)	The Stars, the Oceans & the Moon (2018)	The John Peel Sessions 1979–1983 (2019)

The Stars, the Oceans & the Moon is a compilation album by British rock band Echo & the Bunnymen that features re-recordings of older songs from the band's catalogue and two new songs. It was released on 5 October 2018 with mixed reviews with a score of 64 out of 100 on Metacritic.

== Reception ==
Editors at AllMusic rated this album 2 out of 5 stars, with critic Tim Sendra writing that the new songs and lack of a coherent approach to re-recordings "makes for a jumbled listening experience that is sure to leave many Echo fans wondering just why the record exists". Writing for The Skinny, Alan O'Hare rated this album 3 out of 5 stars, writing that only some tracks work in re-recorded form and "it's hard to see many fans going back to these recordings instead of the originals after a curious first listen".

== Track listing ==
No.	Title	Writer(s)	Original release	Length
1.	"Bring On the Dancing Horses"	Ian McCulloch, Les Pattinson, Pete De Freitas, Will Sergeant	Songs to Learn & Sing	4:01
2.	"The Somnambulist"	McCulloch, Sergeant	New song	3:23
3.	"Nothing Lasts Forever"	McCulloch, Pattinson, Sergeant	Evergreen	4:09
4.	"Lips Like Sugar"	McCulloch, Pattinson, De Freitas, Sergeant	Echo & the Bunnymen	4:27
5.	"Rescue"	McCulloch, Pattinson, De Freitas, Sergeant	Crocodiles	4:17
6.	"Rust"	McCulloch, Pattinson, Sergeant	What Are You Going to Do with Your Life?	5:03
7.	"Angels & Devils"	McCulloch, Pattinson, De Freitas, Sergeant	"Silver" single b-side	3:39
8.	"Bedbugs & Ballyhoo"	McCulloch, Pattinson, De Freitas, Sergeant	Echo & the Bunnymen	3:25
9.	"Zimbo"	McCulloch, Pattinson, De Freitas, Sergeant	Heaven Up Here (as "All My Colours")	4:33
10.	"Stars Are Stars"	McCulloch, Pattinson, Sergeant	Crocodiles	3:30
11.	"Seven Seas"	McCulloch, Pattinson, De Freitas, Sergeant	Ocean Rain	3:43
12.	"Ocean Rain"	McCulloch, Pattinson, De Freitas, Sergeant	Ocean Rain	5:41
13.	"The Cutter"	McCulloch, Pattinson, De Freitas, Sergeant	Porcupine	4:23
14.	"How Far?"	McCulloch, Sergeant	New song	4:40
15.	"The Killing Moon"	McCulloch, Pattinson, De Freitas, Sergeant	Ocean Rain	4:59
Total length:				63:53

== Personnel ==
Echo & the Bunnymen

- Ian McCulloch – guitar, bass guitar, rhythm guitar, keyboards, vocals, production
- Will Sergeant – guitar, steel guitar

Additional personnel

- Ryan Art – design
- Barrie Barlow – drums
- Stephen Brannan – bass guitar
- Jean-Pierre Chalbos – mastering
- Gareth Huw Davies – cello
- Gavin Goldberg – engineering, production, programming
- Nick Kilroe – drums
- London Session Orchestra – strings
- Igor Outkine – accordion
- Ian Skelly – drums
- Sam Swallow – piano, string arrangement, string conducting
- Jez Wing – keyboards, programming, assistant production
- Andrea Wright – engineering, assistant production
- Andy Wright – programming, production

== Charts ==
Chart (2018)	Peak position
Belgian Albums (Ultratop Flanders)	93
Belgian Albums (Ultratop Wallonia)	139
Scottish Albums (Official Charts)	7
UK Albums (Official Charts)	11
UK Independent Albums (Official Charts)	2

== See also ==
- List of 2018 albums
