= Ballyhoo (album) =

Compilation album by Echo & the Bunnymen
- Released: 1997
- Genre: Post-punk
- Label: WEA

Echo & the Bunnymen chronology
The Cutter (1993)	Ballyhoo (1997)	Evergreen (1997)

Professional ratings
Review scores
Source	Rating
AllMusic	4.5/5 stars
NME	8/10

Ballyhoo is a compilation album by Echo & the Bunnymen, released in 1997. Liner notes were written by the group's former manager Bill Drummond.

== Track listing ==
1. "Rescue"
2. "Do It Clean"
3. "Villiers Terrace"
4. "All That Jazz"
5. "Over the Wall"
6. "A Promise"
7. "The Disease"
8. "The Back of Love"
9. "The Cutter"
10. "Never Stop"
11. "The Killing Moon"
12. "Silver"
13. "Seven Seas"
14. "Bring On the Dancing Horses"
15. "People Are Strange"
16. "The Game"
17. "Lips Like Sugar"
18. "Bedbugs and Ballyhoo"

== Charts ==
Chart (1997)	Peak position
Scottish Albums (OCC)	77
UK Albums (OCC)	59

== Certifications ==
Region	Certification	Certified units/sales
United Kingdom (BPI)	Silver	60,000^{^}
^{^} Shipments figures based on certification alone.
