= Seven Seas (album) =

Greatest hits album by Echo & the Bunnymen
- Released: 12 September 2005
- Genre: Post-punk
- Label: WEA

Echo & the Bunnymen chronology
Siberia (2005)	Seven Seas (2005)	The Fountain (2009)

Seven Seas is a compilation album of Echo & the Bunnymen songs. It was released on 12 September 2005 in the United Kingdom and 13 September 2005 in the United States where it is called Seven Seas: The Platinum Collection.

== Track listing ==
1. "The Back of Love" – 3:11
2. "Seven Seas" – 3:17
3. "All That Jazz" – 2:47
4. "Do it Clean" – 2:50
5. "Villiers Terrace" – 6:00
6. "Over the Wall" – 5:59
7. "A Promise" – 4:08
8. "The Disease" – 2:28
9. "Never Stop" – 3:31
10. "The Game" – 3:50
11. "Lips Like Sugar" – 4:52
12. "Bedbugs and Ballyhoo" – 3:28
13. "Bring On the Dancing Horses" – 3:58
14. "Silver" – 3:18
15. "The Cutter" – 3:53
