= Live in Liverpool (Echo & the Bunnymen album) =

2002 live album by Echo & the Bunnymen

Live album by Echo & The Bunnymen
- Released: 6 June 2002
- Recorded: 2001
- Genre: Post-punk
- Length: 1:09:08
- Label: Sire Records
- Producer: Echo & the Bunnymen

Echo & The Bunnymen chronology
| Crystal Days: 1979–1999 (2002) | Live in Liverpool (2002) | Siberia (2005) |

Professional ratings
Review scores
| Source | Rating |
|---|---|
| Allmusic | 3.5/5 stars |
| Pitchfork Media | (7.9/10) |

Live in Liverpool is a live album by Echo & the Bunnymen. It was released in 2002. Featuring live recordings in the band's native city of Liverpool at the Liverpool Institute for Performing Arts (LIPA) on Friday 17 and Saturday 18 August 2001. The album cover features Liverpool Cathedral.

== Track listing ==
1. "Rescue"
2. "Lips Like Sugar"
3. "King of Kings"
4. "Never Stop"
5. "Seven Seas"
6. "Buried Alive"
7. "SuperMellow Man"
8. "My Kingdom"
9. "Zimbo (All My Colours)"
10. "An Eternity Turns"
11. "The Back of Love"
12. "The Killing Moon"
13. "The Cutter"
14. "Over the Wall"
15. "Nothing Lasts Forever"
16. "Ocean Rain"

== Personnel ==
- Ian McCulloch – vocals, guitar
- Will Sergeant – guitar
- Steve Flett – bass
- Ceri James – piano, keyboards
- Vinny Jameson – drums
- Ged Malley – guitar

== Charts ==
| Chart (2002) | Peak position |
|---|---|
| UK Independent Albums (OCC) | 30 |

| Chart (2021) | Peak position |
|---|---|
| Scottish Albums (OCC) | 98 |
| UK Independent Albums (OCC) | 20 |
