= Enlighten Me (Echo & the Bunnymen song) =

Single by Echo & the Bunnymen

from the album Reverberation
- B-side: "Lady Don't Fall Backwards"
- Released: 22 October 1990
- Genre: Alternative rock
- Label: Korova
- Songwriter(s): Noel Burke, Jake Drake-Brockman, Les Pattinson, Damon Reece, Will Sergeant

Echo & the Bunnymen singles chronology
| "'New Live and Rare'" (1988) | "Enlighten Me" (1990) | "Prove Me Wrong" (1991) |

"Enlighten Me" is a single by Echo & the Bunnymen which was released in October 1990. It was the first single released by the band following Ian McCulloch's departure and subsequent replacement by Noel Burke as vocalist and it was the only single to be released from their 1990 album Reverberation.

The single only reached number 96 on the UK Singles Chart, but reached number 8 in the US on the Modern Rock Tracks chart. The single was released as a 7-inch single, a 12-inch single, and a CD single by Korova.

== Track listings ==
7-inch single (Korova KOW44)

1. "Enlighten Me"
2. "Lady Don't Fall Backwards"

12-inch single (Korova KOW44T) and CD single (Korova KOW44CD)

1. "Enlighten Me"
2. "Lady Don't Fall Backwards"
3. "Enlighten Me (12" extended remix)"

== Chart positions ==
| Chart (1990) | Peak position |
|---|---|
| UK Singles Chart | 96 |
| U.S. Modern Rock Tracks | 8 |
