= Ballyhoo (disambiguation) =

Ballyhoo is a dated slang term, commonly defined as "a noisy, attention-getting commotion lacking substance".

In biology, Ballyhoo is the name of a species of baitfish. The word may also refer to:

== Music ==
- Ballyhoo (album), a 1997 album by Echo & the Bunnymen
- Ballyhoo (South African band)
- Ballyhoo!, an American reggae rock band
- Ballyhoo, a song from the Green Day album Saviors' deluxe edition

== Magazine, games and mountain ==
- Ballyhoo (magazine), an American humor magazine published 1931–1954
- Ballyhoo (video game), published 1985
- Ballyhoo, a pinball game released in 1932
- Mount Ballyhoo, a mountain in Alaska
