= Evergreen (Echo & the Bunnymen album) =

1997 studio album

Studio album by Echo & the Bunnymen
- Released: 14 July 1997
- Recorded: January–March 1997
- Studio: Doghouse, Henley-on-Thames, England
- Genre: Alternative rock; psychedelic pop
- Length: 50:04
- Label: London
- Producer: Echo & the Bunnymen

Echo & the Bunnymen chronology
Reverberation (1990)	Evergreen (1997)	What Are You Going to Do with Your Life? (1999)

Singles from Evergreen
- 1. "Nothing Lasts Forever" Released: 20 June 1997; 2. "I Want to Be There (When You Come)" Released: September 1997; 3. "Don't Let It Get You Down" Released: November 1997

Evergreen is the seventh studio album by the English rock band Echo & the Bunnymen. It is their first album since reforming after they disbanded in 1993. Vocalist Ian McCulloch and guitarist Will Sergeant had previously worked together as Electrafixion before they were rejoined by bassist Les Pattinson under the name Echo & the Bunnymen in early 1997. The album was recorded at Doghouse Studios in Henley-on-Thames and was produced by McCulloch and the band's manager Paul Toogood but was credited to the whole band.

Following a successful return to live performances and the release of the single "Nothing Lasts Forever", the album was released in July 1997. Two further singles – "I Want to Be There" and "Don't Let It Get You Down" – followed the album's release. The album received good reviews from the music press and was received well by the public, reaching number eight on the UK Albums Chart. The album would eventually reach Gold sales in 2024.

== Background ==
After leaving Echo & the Bunnymen in 1988 to pursue a solo career, vocalist Ian McCulloch released two albums that were not commercial successes. Despite McCulloch's departure and drummer Pete de Freitas's death, guitarist Will Sergeant and bassist Les Pattinson decided to recruit three new members – Noel Burke (vocals), Jake Brockman (keyboards) and Damon Reece (drums) – and continue with the same band name, which angered McCulloch. The Bunnymen released one further album, Reverberation (1990), which critics and fans alike received poorly. WEA Records subsequently dropped the group, who went on to break-up in early 1993.

McCulloch met former Smiths guitarist Johnny Marr in 1993 and they wrote and recorded an album, tentatively titled Touch Down. The album was to be released in early 1994; however, despite McCulloch and Marr being happy with the album, Rob Dickins at WEA felt it was missing some element. Dickins suggested to McCulloch that Sergeant be brought in to do some work. McCulloch was initially sceptical because he had not spoken with Sergeant since de Freitas's funeral; however, he did give the idea some thought. Before McCulloch had chance to contact Sergeant, a mutual friend persuaded the pair to meet socially. While McCulloch and Sergeant were being reacquainted, the tapes from the McCulloch and Marr sessions disappeared. McCulloch was not upset about this as he and Sergeant had started working together as Electrafixion.

With McCulloch influenced by American alternative rock bands such as Nirvana and The Smashing Pumpkins, the group employed a heavier sound than Echo & the Bunnymen's previous work. After successfully touring the United Kingdom and refusing to play any Echo & the Bunnymen material, Electrafixion released their only album, Burned, in September 1995. Despite critics giving the album good reviews, sales of it and the follow-up singles were disappointing. After embarking on a tour of the United States in 1996, Electrafixion eventually gave in to fan pressure and began to introduce Echo & the Bunnymen material to their live set. Sergeant felt that as the band were playing Echo & the Bunnymen songs, they might as well reform Echo & the Bunnymen; however, McCulloch was initially opposed to the idea. McCulloch changed his mind and, having persuaded Pattinson to come out of retirement, Echo & the Bunnymen was reformed in mid-1996. McCulloch felt Echo & the Bunnymen could not reform without Pattinson and described the bassist's involvement as "integral". McCulloch went on to say it was important to "feel like the original group". He has also said, "Right from the first demo [of Evergreen] we realised that we'd still got that chemistry."

== Recording and packaging ==
The recording of Evergreen started at the beginning of 1997 when Echo & the Bunnymen entered Doghouse Studios in Henley-on-Thames. The production of the album was undertaken by McCulloch and Paul Toogood, the band's new manager, although it was credited to the band in the liner notes to the album. With Oasis in the next studio, Liam Gallagher contributed backing vocals to the track "Nothing Lasts Forever". McCulloch said, "We just hit it off right away, and after a few beers he ended up singing on the record." McCulloch also said that Gallagher "insisted we put tambourine on ['Nothing Lasts Forever']" which "took [it] to another level". Adam Peters, who had previously worked on the band's 1984 album Ocean Rain, was brought in to provide string arrangements for the album. Using musicians from the London Metropolitan Orchestra, Peters recorded string passages for seven tracks from the album at Abbey Road Studios in London. With Clif Norrell, who had previously worked with R.E.M., finishing the mixing of the album, the recording was completed by the end of March 1997.

The photograph used on the front cover of the album was shot by Norman Watson, who also directed the videos for two of the singles from the album – "Nothing Lasts Forever", which was to become the lead single from the album, and "I Want to Be There". The cover was shot in Marrakesh in early May 1997 and echoes the cover of the band's 1980 debut album Crocodiles. The cover picture shows the band against a backdrop of trees at night. However, in place of the band's former drummer de Freitas, who died in a motorcycle accident, the photograph shows the remaining band members with a Citroen DS.

== Releases and reception ==
Professional ratings
Review scores
Source	Rating
AllMusic	4/5 stars
Entertainment Weekly	(B−)
NME	6/10

The live debut of "Nothing Lasts Forever" was at the Cream nightclub in Liverpool in early May 1997 at Echo & the Bunnymen's first concert since reforming. This was followed by two sold-out concerts at the Mercury Lounge in New York and a number of festival appearances in the US, UK and Europe before Evergreen was released on 14 July 1997 by London Records. A limited edition version containing a bonus disc titled History of the Peel Sessions 1979–1997 was released at the same time. The bonus disc contains tracks that were recorded live for John Peel's show on BBC Radio 1 between 1979 and 1997. Following the album, two more singles were released – "I Want to Be There (When You Come)" in September 1997 and "Don't Let It Get You Down" in November 1997. The album was reissued in 1999 with the addition of four live tracks.

Reviewing Evergreen for AllMusic, Ned Raggett described it as "an attractive piece of work" when it "shines at its best". Jeremy Helligar for Entertainment Weekly was not as keen and described the reunion as having "the feel of a non-event".

Evergreen became Echo & the Bunnymen's fifth album to make the Top 10 of the UK Albums Chart when it reached number eight during its first week of release and stayed on the chart for seven weeks. "Nothing Lasts Forever" reached number eight on the UK Singles Chart, although the follow-up singles "I Want to Be There (When You Come)" and "Don't Let It Get You Down" fared less well reaching numbers thirty and fifty respectively.

== Track listing ==
All tracks are written by Echo & the Bunnymen.

Evergreen track listing
No.	Title	Length
1.	"Don't Let It Get You Down"	3:52
2.	"In My Time"	3:26
3.	"I Want to Be There (When You Come)"	3:39
4.	"Evergreen"	4:11
5.	"I'll Fly Tonight"	4:24
6.	"Nothing Lasts Forever"	3:57
7.	"Baseball Bill"	4:04
8.	"Altamont"	3:53
9.	"Just a Touch Away"	5:09
10.	"Empire State Halo"	4:00
11.	"Too Young to Kneel"	3:40
12.	"Forgiven"	5:49

1999 reissue bonus tracks
No.	Title	Length
13.	"I Want to Be There (When You Come)" (live)	3:25
14.	"Bedbugs and Ballyhoo" (live)	3:42
15.	"Rescue" (live)	3:49
16.	"Lips Like Sugar" (live)	4:40

History of the Peel Sessions 1979–1997 limited edition bonus disc
No.	Title	Length
1.	"Villiers Terrace" (live)	4:13
2.	"Read It in Books" (live)	2:31
3.	"All That Jazz" (live)	2:56
4.	"Over the Wall" (live)	4:49
5.	"All My Colours" (live)	4:28
6.	"The Back of Love" (live)	4:15
7.	"Seven Seas" (live)	3:57
8.	"Ocean Rain" (live)	3:50
9.	"Nocturnal Me" (live)	4:13
10.	"Rescue" (live)	3:48

== Personnel ==
Echo & the Bunnymen

- Ian McCulloch – vocals, guitar, piano
- Will Sergeant – guitar
- Les Pattinson – bass
- Michael Lee – drums (sessions)

with:

- Adam Peters – keyboards, arrangement (strings), conductor (strings)
- Ed Shearmur – piano on "Nothing Lasts Forever"
- London Metropolitan Orchestra – strings
- Liam Gallagher – backing vocals on "Nothing Lasts Forever"

Technical

- Echo & the Bunnymen – producer
- Mark Phythian – engineer
- Cenzo Townshend – engineer
- Markus Butler – assistant engineer
- Clif Norrell – mixing
- Richard Woodcraft – mixing assistant
- Don C. Tyler – digital editing
- Stephen Marcussen – mastering
- Guy Massey – recording (strings)
- Alex Scannell – recording assistant (strings)
- Norman Watson – photography

== Charts ==
Chart (1997)	Peak position
Scottish Albums (OCC)	16
UK Albums (OCC)	8

Chart (2022)	Peak position
Scottish Albums (OCC)	16
UK Independent Albums (OCC)	4
UK Albums (OCC)	53

== Certifications ==
Region	Certification	Certified units/sales
United Kingdom (BPI)	Gold	100,000^{‡}
^{‡} Sales+streaming figures based on certification alone.
