= Reverberation (album) =

1990 studio album by Echo & the Bunnymen

Studio album by Echo & the Bunnymen
- Released: 5 November 1990
- Recorded: May 1990
- Studio: Ridge Farm Studio, Surrey, England
- Genre: Alternative rock, psychedelia
- Length: 46:42
- Label: WEA, Sire
- Producer: Geoff Emerick

Echo & the Bunnymen chronology
Echo & the Bunnymen (1987)	Reverberation (1990)	Evergreen (1997)

Singles from Reverberation
- 1. "Enlighten Me" Released: 22 October 1990

Reverberation is the sixth studio album by the English rock band Echo & the Bunnymen. The album was released amidst a line-up change for the group, due to the departure of vocalist Ian McCulloch and the death of drummer Pete de Freitas. The remaining members, guitarist Will Sergeant and bassist Les Pattinson, were joined by ex-St. Vitus Dance singer Noel Burke, keyboard player Jake Brockman and drummer Damon Reece. The album was produced by former Beatles engineer Geoff Emerick at Ridge Farm Studio in Surrey, England, and had a more pronounced psychedelic sound than the group's previous releases.

Following the album's November 1990 release, critical reviews were not favourable; critics noted Burke to be a poor replacement for McCulloch, who they believed was an indispensable aspect of the band. After Reverberation failed to chart, the band were dropped by WEA Records and, after two independently released singles, they disbanded in 1993.

== Background and recording ==
Following a Japanese tour in April 1988, lead singer Ian McCulloch announced that Echo & the Bunnymen would split up. Following the announcement, McCulloch returned to the United Kingdom to visit his father who had just suffered two heart attacks and who died just before McCulloch was able to visit him. After five months of speculation as to whether the split was genuine, McCulloch met with the other members of the band in September 1988 and, despite attempts to change his mind, told them he was leaving. McCulloch later said "The last days of The Bunnymen consisted of a bunch of people who were more interested in changing oil in their cars than rock 'n' roll. That pissed me off. I was doing every sodding interview, writing sodding every song." After a failed attempt to record with The B-52's singers Kate Pierson and Cindy Wilson, the band advertised for a full-time replacement.

While McCulloch was recording his debut solo album, Candleland (1989), Echo & the Bunnymen promoted long-time touring keyboard player Jake Brockman to a full-time band member position. In April 1989, after listening to an album by the defunct band St. Vitus Dance which had been recommended by Geoff Davies of Probe Records in Liverpool, Sergeant felt that the band's singer Noel Burke would work well within the context of the band's sound. After a meeting with the band and being reassured that they did not want a McCulloch clone, Burke agreed to join. However, tragedy struck when on 14 June 1989 de Freitas died in a motorcycle accident on his way to the band's first rehearsal. The band recruited Damon Reece, a friend of Brockman, as drummer in de Freitas's place and began rehearsals. The new line-up played their first string of performances in mid-March 1990 with a mixture of old and new material.

The new line-up entered Ridge Farm Studio in Surrey, England in mid-May 1990 to record the new album with producer Geoff Emerick, who had previously been the engineer for several albums by The Beatles. While recording the album, Emerick would sit on the stairs outside the studio so that he could "listen to the mix properly". Emerick employed the use of instruments such as sitars and tabla as well as backwards guitar loops. The album contained many of Sergeant's favoured psychedelic influences.

== Release, reception and aftermath ==
Professional ratings
Review scores
Source	Rating
AllMusic	2.5/5 stars
Entertainment Weekly	C−
Record Mirror	2.5/5 stars

"Enlighten Me", released in October 1990, was the only single to be released from Reverberation. The single fared badly on the UK Singles Chart only reaching No. 96, although it reached number eight on the Hot Modern Rock Tracks chart in the United States. The album's release followed in early November 1990, and Echo & the Bunnymen immediately went on a seventeen-date tour that focused on the United Kingdom and Ireland. The tour received good reviews, with Melody Maker describing the band as "an object lesson in how to survive and prosper". However, the reviews of the album were not as good. Awarding the album two and a half stars out of five, Tim DiGravina, who reviewed the album for AllMusic, said, "Echo & the Bunnymen doesn't exist without the distinctive voice of Ian McCulloch". Although he added that the album would have been a "great debut" had the band decided to record under a different name. Bob Mack, reviewing the album for Entertainment Weekly was more forceful in putting the album down. He described the sound of the album as "hopelessly in thrall to the brand of pale pseudo-psychedelia [the band] helped popularise during the past decade". He went on to describe Burke and most of the songs as "nondescript". He finished his review by saying "this is a turkey best left to be gobbled up by the band's relatives, close friends, and diehard fans".

Failing to make the UK Albums Chart, Reverberation was the poorest performing Echo & the Bunnymen album at that time. Echo & the Bunnymen were dropped by WEA Records in early 1991. After touring East Asia, the band launched their own label, Euphoric Records, in October 1991 with the release of their self-produced single "Prove Me Wrong". The release of another single, "Inside Me, Inside You", followed in March 1992. With neither of the singles released on Euphoric reaching the UK Singles Chart, the band undertook an extensive tour of the United States before finally disbanding in early 1993.

== Track listing ==
All tracks written by Noel Burke, Will Sergeant, Les Pattinson, Jake Brockman & Damon Reece.

1. "Gone, Gone, Gone" – 4:13
2. "Enlighten Me" – 5:01
3. "Cut & Dried" – 3:47
4. "King of Your Castle" – 4:36
5. "Devilment" – 4:44
6. "Thick Skinned World" – 4:18
7. "Freaks Dwell" – 3:51
8. "Senseless" – 4:55
9. "Flaming Red" – 5:33
10. "False Goodbyes" – 5:40

== Personnel ==
Echo & the Bunnymen

- Noel Burke – vocals, guitar, piano
- Will Sergeant – guitar, loops, autoharp
- Les Pattinson – bass, piano
- Jake Brockman – mellotron, farfisa
- Damon Reece – drums, percussion

with:

- Shanker Ganguly – harmonium
- Punita Gupta – sitar
- John Leach – dulcimer
- John Mayer – tambura
- Adam Peters – cello, piano
- Esmail Sheikh – dholak
- Gurdev Singh – tar shahanai

Technical

- Geoff Emerick – producer
- Will Gosling – engineer
- Adrian Moore – assistant engineer
- Paul Apted – assistant engineer
