= Paper & Glue =

Paper & Glue may refer to:

- Paper & Glue, a record label
- Paper & Glue (film)
