= Don't Let It Get You Down (disambiguation) =

Don't Let It Get You Down may refer to:

- "Don't Let It Get You Down" (Echo & the Bunnymen song), a 1997 song by British post-punk band Echo & the Bunnymen, from the album Evergreen
- "Don't Let It Get You Down", a 1972 song by English singer-songwriter Kevin Ayers, from the album Bananamour
- "Don't Let It Get You Down", a song by Joe Sample from the 1973 Crusaders album, The 2nd Crusade
- "Don't Let It Get You Down", a 1989 song by English band Fine Young Cannibals, from the album The Raw & the Cooked
- "Don't Let It Get You Down", a 2002 song by American indie rock band Spoon, from the album Kill the Moonlight
- "Don't Let It Get You Down", a 2006 song by German singer Mike Leon Grosch
