= Adam Peters (composer) =

British composer

- Born: England
- Occupations: Composer, musician
- Instruments: Cello; keyboards; Piano; synthesizers

Adam Peters is a British composer. He is known for his work with various bands and artists, as well as film and television scoring.

== Career ==
=== Band ===
Peters' first band was called the Disruptive Patterns, where he played as a keyboardist. He began playing cello, piano and keyboards with Echo & the Bunnymen and during his time with the band, they released several albums, including Ocean Rain, Evergreen and Reverberation. His collaboration with lead vocalist Ian McCulloch and guitarist Will Sergeant resulted in some of the band's most beloved tracks, such as "The Killing Moon", "Seven Seas" and "Never Stop".

Peters had a collaboration with the Australian band The Triffids for the albums Born Sandy Devotional, Calenture and The Black Swan. Peters and David McComb contributed to the Leonard Cohen tribute album I'm Your Fan with a cover of "Don't Go Home With Your Hard-On" in 1991. The Flowerpot Men was an early electronic music group formed by Peters and Ben Watkins, the band released three 12-inch EPs, including the track "Beat City", which was featured in the 1986 film Ferris Bueller's Day Off.

Peters' cello was featured on The Dream Academy's albums. In 1994, he co-founded the band Family Of God, with clothing entrepreneur Chris Brick, releasing three albums: "Family Of God", "We Are The World", and "Exiter". In 1997, The New York Times described the band "mesmerizing psychedelic rock".

=== Film and television ===
Peters has also composed music for film and television. He collaborated with director such as Oliver Stone on the projects South of the Border, Savages, Snowden and The Untold History of the United States and Bryan Fogel on the documentaries Icarus, The Dissident and Icarus: The Aftermath. He wrote the orchestral arrangements for Paddington and contributed music to Rango, The Amazing Spider Man 2, Joker: Folie à Deux and Crazy, Stupid, Love.

== Selected filmography ==
=== Film ===
Year	Title
2024	Mountain Queen: The Summits of Lhakpa Sherpa
2022	Icarus: The Aftermath
2021	Paper & Glue
2021	Biggie: I Got a Story to Tell
2020	Francesco
2020	The Dissident
2019	Fantastic Fungi
2017	Sand Castle
2017	The Yellow Birds
2017	Icarus
2016	Snowden
2013	The Man Whose Mind Exploded
2012	Savages
2012	After Porn Ends
2009	South of the Border

=== Television ===
Year	Title
2023	Never Let Him Go
2022	Shantaram
2022	Hostages
2018	Phenoms
2012-2013	The Untold History of the United States
2007-2008	Bone Detectives

== Awards and nominations ==
Year	Result	Award	Category	Work	Ref.
2018	Nominated	Motion Picture Sound Editors	Outstanding Achievement in Sound Editing – Sound Effects, Foley, Dialogue and ADR for Feature Documentary	Icarus	
