= I Want to Be There (When You Come) =

1997 single by Echo & the Bunnymen

- CD#1 cover

Single by Echo & the Bunnymen

from the album Evergreen
- Released: September 1997
- Recorded: Olympic Studios, London
- Genre: Alternative rock, post-grunge, pop rock
- Length: 3:38
- Label: London
- Songwriters: Will Sergeant, Ian McCulloch, Les Pattinson
- Producer: Echo & the Bunnymen

Echo & the Bunnymen singles chronology
"Nothing Lasts Forever" (1997)	"I Want to Be There (When You Come)" (1997)	"Don't Let It Get You Down" (1997)

CD#2 cover

7" single cover

"I Want to Be There (When You Come)" is a single by Echo & the Bunnymen which was released in September 1997. It was the second single released after Ian McCulloch, Will Sergeant and Les Pattinson reformed the band. It was also the second single to be released from their 1997 album, Evergreen. It reached number 30 on the UK Singles Chart, number 26 on the US Modern Rock Tracks chart, and number 16 on the Canadian RPM Alternative 30 chart.

== Overview ==
Like their previous single, "Nothing Lasts Forever", the single was released on London Records as a 7-inch single and as two separate CD versions – apart from the title track all three releases had different track listings and each with a different cover.

The B-side to the 7-inch single and the extra tracks of the second CD are acoustic live tracks which were recorded for WHYT radio in Detroit, Michigan. The extra tracks for the first CD are tracks which were recorded for The Jo Whiley Show and were first transmitted on BBC Radio 1 on 11 June 1997.

Written by Will Sergeant, Ian McCulloch and Les Pattinson, the title track was also self-produced by the band. It was engineered by Cenzo Townsend and mixed by Mark Stent. The Jo Wiley session tracks were produced by Miti.

== Track listings ==
All tracks written by Will Sergeant, Ian McCulloch and Les Pattinson except where noted.

7-inch release (London LON399 and 850 986-7)

1. "I Want to Be There (When You Come)"
2. "The Killing Moon" (live acoustic version) (Sergeant, McCulloch, Pattinson, Pete de Freitas)

CD No. 1 release (London LONCD399)

1. "I Want to Be There (When You Come)" – 3:38
2. "The Killing Moon" (Jo Whiley session) (Sergeant, McCulloch, Pattinson, de Freitas) – 4:51
3. "Nothing Lasts Forever" (Jo Whiley session) – 4:20

CD No. 2 release (London LOCDP399)

1. "I Want to Be There (When You Come)" – 3:38
2. "Lips Like Sugar" (live acoustic version) (Sergeant, McCulloch, Pattinson, de Freitas) – 4:18
3. "I Want to Be There (When You Come)" (live acoustic version) – 3:36

== Chart positions ==
Chart (1997)	Peak position
UK Singles Chart	30
US Modern Rock Tracks	26
Canadian RPM Alternative 30	16

== Personnel ==
=== Musicians ===
- Ian McCulloch – vocals, guitar
- Will Sergeant – lead guitar
- Les Pattinson – bass

=== Production ===
- Echo & the Bunnymen – producer
- Miti – producer (Jo Whiley session tracks)
- Cenzo Townsend – engineer
- Mark Stent – mixed by
