= Elizabeth Fraser =

Scottish singer (born 1963)

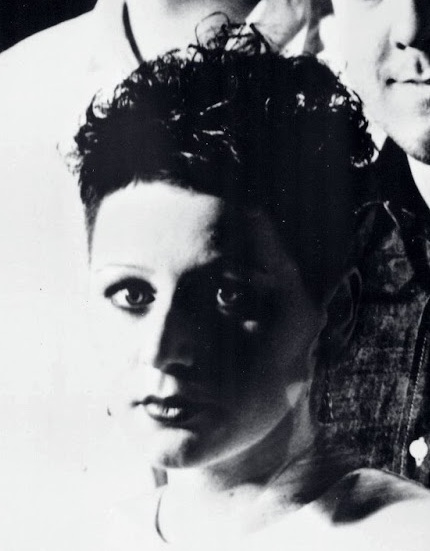
- Fraser in 1986

Background information
- Born: Elizabeth Davidson Fraser; 29 August 1963 (age 63); Grangemouth, Stirlingshire, Scotland
- Genres: Dream pop; gothic rock; post-punk; ethereal wave
- Occupations: Singer; songwriter
- Instrument: Vocals
- Years active: 1981–present
- Labels: 4AD; Relativity; Capitol; Fontana; Bella Union
- Formerly of: Cocteau Twins

Elizabeth Davidson Fraser (born 29 August 1963) is a Scottish singer, best known as the vocalist for the band Cocteau Twins with whom she achieved international recognition for her distinctive vocal style, characterised by an extensive range, melismatic phrasing and the use of abstract and often unintelligible lyrics. Her expressive and unconventional approach to singing became a defining characteristic of the band's sound and contributed to their influence on the development of dream pop and ethereal wave music. Her distinctive style has received much critical praise; she was described by critic Jason Ankeny as "an utterly unique performer whose swooping, operatic vocals relied less on any recognisable language than on the subjective sounds and textures of verbalised emotions".

The band's studio albums Victorialand (1986) and Heaven or Las Vegas (1990) reached the top ten of the UK Album Charts, while other albums, including Blue Bell Knoll (1988) and Four-Calendar Café (1993), charted on the Billboard 200 album charts in the United States and the top 20 in the UK. Their final studio album before their disbandment, Milk & Kisses (1996), peaked within the top twenty on the UK Albums Charts, the top thirty on the Scottish Albums Charts and top one hundred of the Billboard 200. Outside of the Cocteau Twins, she performed as part of the 4AD group This Mortal Coil, including the successful 1983 single "Song to the Siren", and as a guest with Massive Attack on several tracks from their 1998 album Mezzanine, most notably the commercially successful single "Teardrop", and album tracks "Black Milk" and "Group Four". She later collaborated with the band again on the track "Silent Spring", released on their 2006 compilation Collected.

When the Cocteau Twins disbanded, Fraser embarked on a solo career and provided guest vocals for other artists. She released some solo material, including the singles "Underwater" which was released in 2000, and "Moses", which was released in 2009. In 2022, Fraser released the EP Sun's Signature, which includes a reworked version of her 2000 single "Underwater". Fraser has joined Massive Attack on several of their tours, including in 2018 and most recently on their 2024 and 2026 European tours.

== Early life ==
Fraser was born and grew up in Grangemouth. She described it as "a dark and stifling industrial town". Her mother worked in a factory. She was the youngest of six children. During her teenage years, she developed eating disorders and became bulimic. In the 1990s, Fraser said she experienced childhood sexual abuse by relatives; she was later forced to leave the family house at 16 for having a punk look. Music was important and represented an escape; at that time, Fraser had portraits of her heroes like Siouxsie Sioux tattooed on her arms, which she later lasered off. She met Robin Guthrie at 17: "What brought us together was me having no ideas and opinions of my own, and him having plenty – enough for both of us. We were attracted to each other for the wrong reasons".

== Cocteau Twins (1981–1997) ==
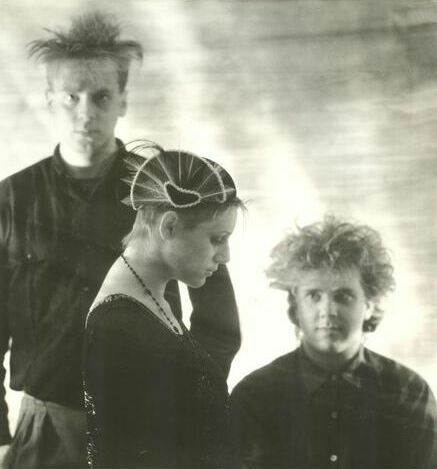
Fraser (centre) with Cocteau Twins, 1986

Fraser became the vocalist and lyricist in Cocteau Twins in 1981. Cocteau Twins was founded in 1979 by Guthrie and Will Heggie; they spotted her dancing at a club one night and asked her to join their band. At the time, she was 17 years old and had not thought of herself as a singer. After an on-off phase, the band recorded some tracks which were sent as demos to John Peel and Ivo Watts-Russell of 4AD, which led to their signing by the London-based label and a career in music. Fraser and Guthrie formed a relationship, and in 1989 had a daughter, Lucy Belle. Guthrie liberally used alcohol and drugs throughout the years they were together, and Fraser had a nervous breakdown during the recording of Four-Calendar Café. They broke up in 1993 but opted to continue a musical relationship mostly due to contractual obligations until 1998, when Cocteau Twins were disbanded.

The group released Heaven or Las Vegas in early 1990. The most commercially successful of their many recordings, the album reached number seven in the UK Albums Chart. Despite the success of the record and the subsequent concert tours, they parted ways with 4AD following Heaven or Las Vegas partly because of conflicts with the label's founder Ivo Watts-Russell, and were close to breaking up over internal problems due in large part to Guthrie's substance abuse. Heaven or Las Vegas was certified Silver by the British Phonographic Industry. It sold 235,000 copies by 1996, according to Billboard.

While part of Cocteau Twins, Fraser collaborated with numerous artists. She appeared on 4AD house band This Mortal Coil's first release (along with her Cocteau Twins bandmates), where her contributions included a cover version of Tim Buckley's "Song to the Siren". She provided one-off vocals for acts such as Felt ("Primitive Painters"), Dif Juz ("Love Insane"), The Wolfgang Press, and Ian McCulloch ("Candleland" and "Mysterio"). In 2005, Cocteau Twins were offered the opportunity to reunite and headline the Coachella festival. It was claimed that the Cocteau Twins members – Fraser, Raymonde and Guthrie – would have received £1.5 million each to perform at the concert. Speculation also began around this time that, following a performance at Coachella, the band would reunite and embark on a major tour. Fraser ultimately announced her decision not to take part in the reunion. She recalled in 2009 that she "didn't remember it being that much money and in any case that's not the reason" that she would agree to a Cocteau Twins reunion. In 2021, Raymonde confirmed that the Cocteau Twins would "never reform" to perform or record again.

Fraser had a relationship with singer Jeff Buckley and recorded a duet with him, "All Flowers in Time Bend Towards the Sun", written together, but never released commercially. She speaks about their relationship in the BBC documentary Jeff Buckley: Everybody Here Wants You. In a 2009 interview with The Guardian, Fraser claimed that she found it "difficult" to think about her former Cocteau Twins bandmates, stating "they were my life, and when you're in something that deeply, you have to remove yourself completely".

== Post–Cocteau Twins ==
=== Massive Attack, Mezzanine and OVO (1997–2006) ===
Fraser's solo career has been intermittent, featuring guest appearances with other artists, and rare solo releases and live appearances. Apart from her Cocteau Twins work, she is probably best known for her collaborations with Massive Attack, having recorded three songs for the band's Mezzanine album in 1998 (including the international hit single "Teardrop", on which she replaced the original choice of Madonna), and subsequently toured with the band in 2006, again in 2018–2019 and in 2024. She has also contributed to the soundtracks of several films, including In Dreams, Cruel Intentions, The Winter Guest, The Lord of the Rings: The Fellowship of the Ring and The Lord of the Rings: The Two Towers, and has occasionally appeared as a guest artist on other musicians' projects. In 2005, she appeared on Yann Tiersen's album Les Retrouvailles, singing on two tracks: "Kala" and "Mary".

In 2000, a white label recording, "Underwater", was released in a limited edition of 200 copies. She contributed a cover version of "At Last I Am Free" (originally by '70s band Chic, covered by Robert Wyatt) on the 2003 album Stop Me If You Think You've Heard This One Before, a celebration of 25 years of Rough Trade Records. In 2004, she was invited to participate in an audio exhibit, Shhh..., at London's Victoria and Albert Museum, for which she produced a piece called "Expectant Mood", which has not been made commercially available. Fraser has sporadically collaborated with a range of performers, including The Future Sound of London (Lifeforms EP), Elliot Goldenthal, Craig Armstrong (The Space Between Us), and Peter Gabriel (the millennium project OVO).

Billy Howerdel envisioned Fraser as his first option for A Perfect Circle's lead singer, but she was unavailable for the project. Fraser also rejected a collaboration request from Linkin Park.

=== Record deal and solo album (2006–2016) ===
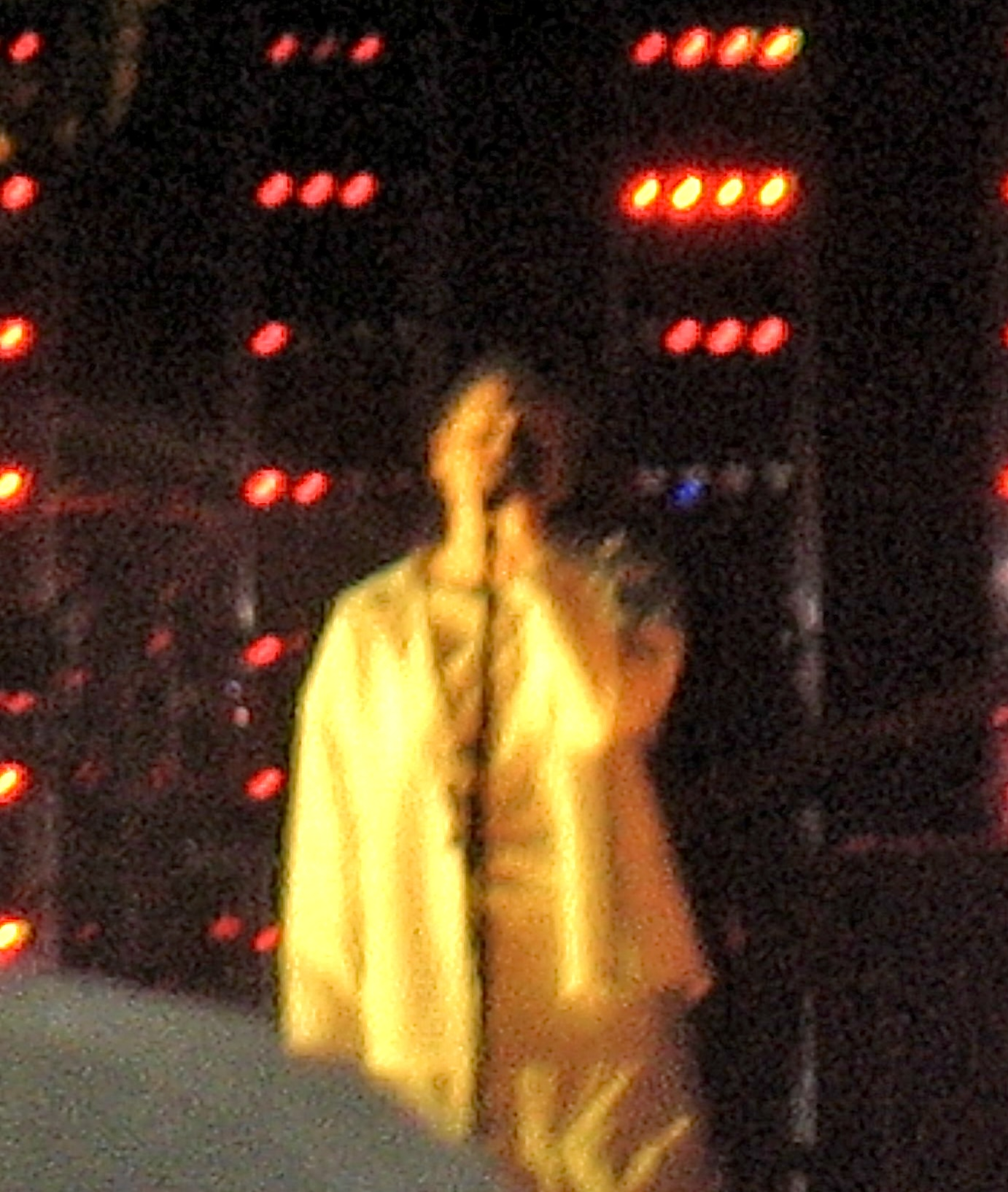
Fraser performing in 2006

She was reportedly signed to Blanco y Negro Records. In December 2006, NME reported that her solo album was due for release in early 2007. The album would have contained eight tracks, one of which was to be a cover version. No titles were announced, and the album was not released in 2007 as suggested. In June 2012, extracts from the as-yet-unreleased album were played on BBC Radio 4. In November 2009, Fraser released a solo single, "Moses", available on 12" and download through Rough Trade. The single was recorded with Damon Reece and Jake Drake-Brockman, and was a memorial to the latter.

In addition to Damon Reece on drums and percussion, Fraser's backing band featured three other former or current members of Spiritualized – Sean Cook (guitar), Martin Shellard (guitar), Thighpaulsandra (keyboards) – and two backing vocalists (Jo Goldsmith-Eteson and Lucy Potterton, both from The Swingle Singers).

=== The Nightmare Worlds of H. G. Wells (2016–2022) ===
In August 2012, Fraser performed at Royal Festival Hall for two nights as part of the Meltdown Festival at London's Southbank Centre, curated by Anohni. Prior to the concerts, she confirmed that she had assembled an album's worth of material and would showcase these at the event, in addition to performing re-interpretations of some Cocteau Twins songs. She also referred to the physical exertion involved in her singing against the wall of sound in many of the Cocteau Twins songs, of which she said it was "like an endurance test. I don't intend to do that again. I've been using my voice more gently." Prior to her appearance at Meltdown, she played a warm-up concert at Bath Pavilion on 4 August.

The 2016 drama series, The Nightmare Worlds of H. G. Wells, carried a score composed by Fraser and Reece. Also in 2016, she collaborated with The Insects on the soundtrack to the BBC TV series The Living and The Dead. She could be heard singing "She Moves Through the Fair" in episode 1, and "The Lover's Ghost" over the end titles in episode 4. The soundtrack has been made available as a digital download.

Fraser made a rare appearance at the Royal Albert Hall on 23 July 2017, in conversation with John Grant. They discussed the Cocteau Twins' 1988 album Blue Bell Knoll, with all proceeds from the event going to the gay rights charity Stonewall. During the conversation, Fraser responded to a question from the audience about a potential collaboration with John Grant, saying, "He doesn't need to persuade me!" Speaking of her insecurity about recording and performing, Fraser said, "I get it in the studio, it's a horror, but it's part of the journey... I don't think I was confident, especially when I stopped singing. That's when the voice kicks in, really nagging you, telling you what a horrible person you are and 'what do you think you're doing'. But then you sing and it shuts up that voice; the other voice is louder…" On 3 September 2018, Fraser performed an intimate, invitation-only performance at the "Society of the Golden Slippers" showcase in Soho, where she was joined by John Grant on harmonies for "Oh Shenandoah".

Fraser appeared as a guest artist on folk singer Sam Lee's single "The Moon Shines Bright", released in December 2019, and subsequently on Sam Lee's album Old Wow, released in January 2020. She sings a fragment of lyrics from the traditional Scottish folk song "Wild Mountain Thyme".

=== Sun's Signature and Massive Attack tours (2022–present) ===
Under the project Sun's Signature with her partner Damon Reece, Fraser was set to release a self-titled extended-play album on 23 April 2022, via Rough Trade Records. It was later announced that the album would be released on 18 June via Partisan Records, with the single "Golden Air" released on 6 April.

In June 2022, Fraser, as part of Sun's Signature with partner Damon Reece, released the extended play entitled Sun's Signature via Partisan Records. The duo also provided the soundtrack for Graham Duff's TV miniseries The Nightmare Worlds of H. G. Wells. The release of the EP marked Fraser's first release in thirteen years, according to Rolling Stone. Between 2024 and 2026, Fraser joined Massive Attack for several live shows.

== Artistry ==
Fraser's lyrics in many of the Cocteau Twins' songs range from straightforward English to abstract mouth music. For some recordings, she has said she used foreign words without knowing their meaning – the words acquired meaning for her only as she sang them. She has a soprano vocal range. Her vocals have been described as "mesmerising," and her high notes have been called "angelic." Her vocal ability led to her being dubbed "the voice of God" and "the voice from another world" by The Telegraph.

Fraser credits Nina Simone as a major influence on her career, songwriting, and recording.

== Legacy ==
Nolan James of Pacific Lutheran University said: "Elizabeth Fraser is one of the greatest vocalists of any pop music group; the fact that [Massive Attack] turned down Madonna to feature Fraser on their hit "Teardrop" is proof enough of that." In 2023, the International Astronomical Union named the asteroid 622398 Fraser after her.

Fraser, and the Cocteau Twins, were said to be "loved" by artist Madonna, and Prince wished to sign the band to his record label.

== Personal life ==
Fraser lives with her partner, drummer Damon Reece (Lupine Howl, Echo & the Bunnymen, Massive Attack) in Bristol. She has two daughters, the first with her former partner Robin Guthrie (born in 1989) and the second with Reece (born in 1998).

Fraser and her bandmate Guthrie were in a relationship from 1980 to 1993. Fraser said the relationship fell apart following challenges with parenthood, Guthrie’s addiction to drugs and alcohol, and her own mental health struggles.

Fraser was in a relationship with American musician Jeff Buckley from 1994 to 1995. Fraser says her collaboration with Massive Attack, “Teardrop,” is about Buckley, who died while the song was being recorded.

Fraser was close friends with English musician Jake Drake-Brockmann (Echo & the Bunnymen).

== Discography ==
Credited as Elizabeth Fraser

- The Moon and the Melodies (1986)

Credited as Cocteau Twins

- Garlands (1982)
- Head over Heels (1983)
- Treasure (1984)
- Victorialand (1986)
- Blue Bell Knoll (1988)
- Heaven or Las Vegas (1990)
- Four-Calendar Café (1993)
- Milk & Kisses (1996)

== Awards and nominations ==
As a member of the Cocteau Twins, Fraser has received several awards in recognition of the bands contribution to music. In 2008, the band received the Q Awards' Inspiration Award, which Elizabeth Fraser described as the first award the group had won. In 2022, the band received the Visionary Award from the Ivors Academy, recognising their innovative contribution to music and songwriting. That same year, their 1990 album Heaven or Las Vegas received the Modern Scottish Classic Award at the Scottish Album of the Year Award.

Year	Organisation	Award	Recipient	Result
2008	Q Awards	Inspiration Award	Cocteau Twins	Won
2022	The Ivors Academy	Visionary Award	Cocteau Twins	Won
2022	Scottish Album of the Year Award	Modern Scottish Classic Award	Heaven or Las Vegas	Won
