= Live in Liverpool =

Live in Liverpool may refer to:

- Live In Liverpool, a 1989 concert video by The Shadows
- Live in Liverpool (Echo & the Bunnymen album)
- Live in Liverpool (Gossip album)
- Live in Liverpool, album by P.P. Arnold
