= The Cutter (album) =

Compilation album by Echo & the Bunnymen
- Released: 15 March 1993
- Genre: Post-punk
- Length: 45:44
- Label: WEA

Echo & the Bunnymen chronology
BBC Radio 1 Live in Concert (1992)	The Cutter (1993)	Ballyhoo (1997)

Professional ratings
Review scores
Source	Rating
Allmusic	2.5/5 stars

The Cutter is a compilation album of Echo & the Bunnymen songs, which was released in 1993.

== Track listing ==
All tracks written by Ian McCulloch, Will Sergeant, Les Pattinson and Pete de Freitas except where noted.

1. "The Cutter" – 3:56
2. "Bombers Bay" – 4:23
3. "Paint it Black" (live) (Jagger/Richards) – 3:13
4. "All You Need is Love" (Lennon–McCartney) – 6:43
5. "Ashes to Ashes" (aka "Stars Are Stars") – 2:46
6. "All My Life" – 4:09
7. "A Promise" – 3:40
8. "Read It in Books" (McCulloch, Julian Cope) – 2:32
9. "Crocodiles" – 2:37
10. "Crystal Days" – 2:26
11. "Ocean Rain" – 5:10
12. "My Kingdom" – 4:04

== Personnel ==
- Ian McCulloch – guitar, vocals
- Will Sergeant – guitar
- Les Pattinson – bass, drums
- Pete de Freitas – drums
