= Carnglaze Caverns =

Artificial caves in Cornwall, UK

Coordinates: 50.4726°N 4.5565°W

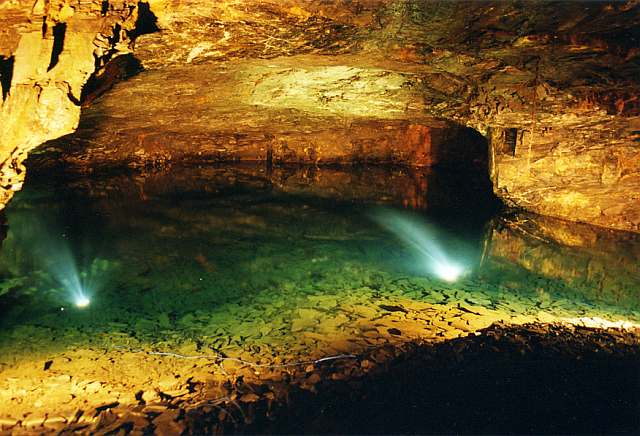
The underground lake in Carnglaze Caverns

Carnglaze Caverns consists of three man-made caverns formed as part of a slate quarry in the Loveny Valley, near the village of St Neot, Liskeard, Cornwall, England, UK.

The first of the caverns, the Rum Store, is so called because it was used by the Royal Navy during the Second World War to store its supply of rum. In 2001 it was converted into an auditorium with seating for 400.

The lowest of the three caverns has a lake, which was where the cover image for Echo & the Bunnymen's LP Ocean Rain was shot.

The caverns have been used as an unusual concert venue, with performances from folk-rock artists such as Fish and Fairport Convention, as well as bands such as Embrace (in 2004), and British Sea Power (in 2005 and 2007). The site has also hosted craft and mineral shows.

== In popular culture ==
In early October 2025, scenes for the upcoming Harry Potter series were filmed here.
