= Inside Me, Inside You =

1992 single by Echo & the Bunnymen

Single by Echo & the Bunnymen
- B-side: "Wigged-Out World"
- Released: 2 March 1992
- Genre: Alternative rock
- Label: Euphoric

Echo & the Bunnymen singles chronology
"Prove Me Wrong" (1991)	"Inside Me, Inside You" (1992)	"Nothing Lasts Forever" (1997)

"Inside Me, Inside You" is a single by Echo & the Bunnymen which was released in 1992. It was the third and final single to be released by the band with Noel Burke as the vocalist. It was released on Euphoric Records as both a CD single (E002CD) and a 12-inch single (E002T).

Like their previous single, "Prove Me Wrong", it failed to chart. The band would split up after the release of this single, with Will Sergeant and Ian McCulloch reuniting as Electrafixion for one album, ultimately reforming Echo & the Bunnymen with Les Pattinson in 1997.

== Track listings ==
1. "Inside Me, Inside You"
2. "Wigged-Out World"
