= Prove Me Wrong =

1991 single by Echo & the Bunnymen

Single by Echo & the Bunnymen
- B-side: "Fine Thing", "Reverberation"
- Released: 28 October 1991
- Genre: Alternative rock
- Length: 3:59
- Label: Euphoric
- Producer: The Bunnymen

Echo & the Bunnymen singles chronology
"Enlighten Me" (1990)	"Prove Me Wrong" (1991)	"Inside Me, Inside You" (1992)

"Prove Me Wrong" is a song by Echo & the Bunnymen which was released in 1991. It was the second single released by the band with Noel Burke as the vocalist. It was also the band's first release with their new record label, Euphoric Records. The single was released as both a CD single (E001CD) and a 12-inch single (E001T) and it was self-produced by the band. The extra/B-side tracks, "Fine Thing" and "Reverberation" were recorded live by BBC Manchester.

== Track listings ==
1. "Prove Me Wrong"
2. "Fine Thing" (live)
3. "Reverberation" (live)
