= October Noir =

American band

- Origin: Pensacola, Florida, U.S.
- Genres: Gothic metal, doom metal, gothic rock
- Years active: 2016–present
- Labels: Independent
- Members: Tom Noir; Doug Lane; Tyler Fleming; Trey Ozinga
- Website: octobernoir.org

October Noir is an American gothic/doom metal band formed in Pensacola, Florida, in 2016. They have released four full-length albums.

== Background ==
October Noir was founded by Tom Noir in late 2016. The band released their first debut album, The Haunting and the Powerful, on October 19, 2017. Drummer Daniel "Stickz" Bryant, guitarist Troy Lambert, and keyboardist Jackie "Jaxxx" Daniel, joined Tom for live performances. In 2018, October Noir released two singles both covers: "Pictures of Matchstick Men (RIPeter)", a Status Quo/Type O Negative track, on April 14, 2018, and "Lips Like Sugar", an Echo & the Bunnymen cover, on July 5, 2018.

On October 1, 2019, their second album, Thirteen, was released. Seven days later, guitarist Doug Lane and keyboardist Justin Thompson joined the band, completing the quartet. On January 14, 2020, a cover of Chris Isaak's "Wicked Game" was released, marking the first October Noir song where instruments were credited to each member of the quartet. They released two additional singles in 2020: "Race War", a Carnivore cover, and "Cry Little Sister", a Gerard McMahon cover.

On April 14, 2021, the Type O Negative cover "Love You to Death" was released to coincide with the 11-year anniversary of Peter Steele's death. In late June 2021, keyboardist Justin Thompson left the band for personal reasons. October Noir released their third album, Fate, Wine, & Wisteria, on September 22, 2021. One month prior, one of their tracks, "Windows", was released as a single, the band's first single taken from any of their albums.

On March 30, 2022 October Noir released the song "Crimson and Clover", a cover of Tommy James and The Shondells. On September 22, 2023, October Noir released their fourth album, Letters to Existence.

== Style ==
The band's sound is influenced by gothic metal pioneers Type O Negative, from whom they also derive much of their aesthetic and lyrical inspiration, as well as from additional bands like The Cure, Def Leppard, My Dying Bride, Tool, and The Cult.

== Members ==
Current members

- Tom Noir – bass, vocals (2016–present)
- Doug Lane – guitars (2019–2022), keyboards (2022–present)
- Tyler Fleming – drums (2021–present)
- Trey Ozinga – guitars (2022–present)

Former members

- Troy Lambert – guitars (2017–2019)
- Jaxxx Daniel – keyboards (2017–2019)
- Justin Thompson – keyboards (2019–2021)
- Daniel "Stickz" Bryant – drums (2017–2021)

== Discography ==
=== Studio albums ===
- The Haunting and the Powerful (2017)
- Thirteen (2019)
- Fate, Wine, & Wisteria (2021)
- The Haunting and the Powerful (Remaster) (2022)
- Letters to Existence (2023)

=== Singles ===
- "Pictures of Matchstick Men (RIPeter)" (2018)
- "Lips Like Sugar" (2018)
- "Wicked Game" (2020)
- "Race War" (2020)
- "Cry Little Sister" (2020)
- "Love You to Death" (2021)
- "Windows" (2021)
- "Crimson and Clover" (2022)
- "Nights In White Satin" featuring "Denis Pauna" (2022)
- "Endless Lonely" (2022)
- "Forever Haunt" (2023)
