= Echo & the Bunnymen (album) =

1987 eponymous studio album

Studio album by Echo & the Bunnymen
- Released: 6 July 1987
- Recorded: Conny's (Cologne); ICP (Brussels); The Workhouse (London); Amazon (Liverpool)
- Genres: Alternative rock; post-punk
- Length: 45:46
- Labels: Warner Bros.; Sire
- Producer: Laurie Latham

Echo & the Bunnymen chronology
Ocean Rain (1984)	Echo & the Bunnymen (1987)	Reverberation (1990)

Singles from Echo & the Bunnymen
- 1. "The Game" Released: 1 June 1987; 2. "Lips Like Sugar" Released: 20 July 1987; 3. "Bedbugs and Ballyhoo" Released: 1987

Echo & the Bunnymen is the fifth studio album by the English rock band Echo & the Bunnymen. It was their last with drummer Pete de Freitas, who died in 1989 in a motorcycle accident, aged 27. The album was produced by Laurie Latham; the sessions took place in Germany, Belgium, London and Liverpool, following an aborted attempt at recording the tracks without de Freitas and with producer Gil Norton. With Latham being an exacting producer, and lead vocalist Ian McCulloch receiving star treatment and drinking heavily, the recording was more difficult than the band had initially hoped. The album made more use of keyboards than their previous studio albums, which had been string-heavy. Three singles were issued: "The Game", "Lips Like Sugar" and "Bedbugs and Ballyhoo".

Upon its release, Echo & the Bunnymen received mixed reviews from the music press. However, the album was successful in the United Kingdom and, to a lesser degree, the United States: it reached number four on the UK Albums Chart and has been certified silver by the BPI, and in North America it reached number 51 on the United States Billboard 200 and number 51 on the Canadian RPM 100 Albums. In Europe, it stayed in the European Top 100 Albums for eight weeks, peaking at number 36 on its fourth week.

== Background ==
Echo & the Bunnymen took time off from touring, writing and recording after the release of the critically acclaimed Ocean Rain in 1984, because the band's manager, the fabled prankster Bill Drummond, felt that a year off would help the band write different kinds of songs in preparation for the next album. During the time off, drummer Pete de Freitas travelled through Spain and France on his motorcycle, bassist Les Pattinson worked on his new boat, and lead vocalist Ian McCulloch released a solo single, "September Song", leaving guitarist Will Sergeant as the only band member to spend the time doing nothing. Even though the band enjoyed an excellent and creative working relationship with Drummond, by the end of 1984 they had mutually parted company as the band were not making enough money.

Under the new management of Mick Hancock, Duran Duran's tour manager, the band returned to work in May 1985 with a tour of Scandinavia. They also made a headline appearance at the Glastonbury Festival on 21 June 1985, when they played live for the first time two new songs that would later be included on the album—"Satellite" and "All in Your Mind". Now ready to start recording, they entered the studio with Clive Langer and their former producer Ian Broudie to record the songs they had played at Glastonbury, as well as "Like a Rollercoaster" and "Jimmy Brown". Not liking the results of this session, the band considered Eddy Grant and ABBA's production team before settling on Laurie Latham as their producer. McCulloch had been impressed by the sharp quality of Latham's production on the Stranglers' single "Skin Deep". The band met with Latham in Brussels, Belgium, and recorded "All in Your Mind", "Like a Rollercoaster" and "Jimmy Brown", which was renamed "Bring On the Dancing Horses". "Bring On the Dancing Horses" appeared on the compilation album Songs to Learn & Sing in November 1985, and was released as a single in the same month. An early version of "Bedbugs and Ballyhoo", a song that would appear on the album, appeared on the B-side to the 12" version.

On 31 December 1985, de Freitas went to New Orleans with the road crew on a drug binge and there announced his resignation from the band. Hence, the band faced 1986 with a commitment to record an album, but without their drummer—a musician who was considered fundamental to the band's creative success. They hired former Haircut One Hundred drummer Blair Cunningham for the spring 1986 tour of the United States; however, he did not fit in, and left after the tour to join the Pretenders. The band then hired former ABC drummer David Palmer, and recorded a few sessions with producer Gil Norton for the new album. However, Palmer decided by July 1986 that he did not want to remain with the band. As he left the band, de Freitas returned to the United Kingdom and expressed a wish to rejoin. Uncertain of de Freitas's commitment to the band, and his fragile mental state, they took him back as a session musician rather than a full member. Now with the line-up that would record Echo & the Bunnymen, the band gave a live television appearance for the BBC in September 1986 when they played two new songs, "The Game" and "Lips Like Sugar". According to Will Sergeant, the band were under pressure from Warner Music chairman Rob Dickins to produce an album that would replicate the success of Peter Gabriel's recent number one album So (1986): "I couldn't believe it when Rob Dickins brought us into his office and played us Peter Gabriel's album: 'I want you to sound like this!' I think he escaped with his life that day."

== Recording, production and music ==
Recording of the tracks that were to appear on Echo & the Bunnymen began at Conny Plank's studio in Cologne, Germany. Both Echo & the Bunnymen and their label, Warner Bros. Records, were unhappy with the results of the Norton sessions with Palmer playing drums. Keen to record again with de Freitas, the band decided to scrap the Norton sessions and to start recording a new album with Latham who had previously worked with the band on their 1985 single "Bring On the Dancing Horses". The sessions moved from Cologne to ICP Studios in Brussels, Belgium before returning to Cologne and finishing off at The Workhouse in London and Amazon Studios in Liverpool. The band hoped that the album would be a collection of simple songs; however, Latham was very specific and exacting, and he would work on one song for as long as a month. Recording was also complicated by the star treatment received by McCulloch. This, along with his heavy drinking, alienated him from the rest of the band. In a 1995 interview, band guitarist Will Sergeant said of McCulloch's treatment, "We just found it all ridiculous. He had people running around behind him, basically wiping his arse." McCulloch later said in a 1997 interview: "I knew I was losing it. I was on another planet but then I didn't want to be on the one [the other Bunnymen] were on."

"They're one of my favourite bands. Ian McCulloch is an excellent poet. He's dark and moody and mysterious."

— Ray Manzarek of the Doors

While making the album, the band recorded a cover version of the Doors' 1967 single "People Are Strange" for the soundtrack of the 1987 film The Lost Boys. Ray Manzarek, former keyboardist with the Doors, was brought in to provide keyboards on the song. While in the studio, he also contributed keyboards to a re-recording of "Bedbugs and Ballyhoo", which had previously been the B-side of the 12" single version of "Bring On the Dancing Horses". Once Echo & the Bunnymen had been recorded the band's management company, Direct Management, decided to have it mixed by Bruce Lampcov in the United States. While the album was mixed, the band was on tour in Brazil and listened to the finished tracks over the phone.

Latham moved the band away from the use of strings, which featured heavily on Ocean Rain and to a lesser extent on Porcupine (1983), and introduced keyboards to the melody of the tracks. De Freitas's drumming was contained and discreet and McCulloch's vocals were more restrained. Although the album contained hook-heavy tracks such as "Lips Like Sugar", the guitars on tracks such as "Lost and Found" are more representative of the album as a whole.

The resulting album was disliked by the entire band. Describing in 1987 what he thought of as the over-production of the album, Sergeant described it as "an overcooked fish"; bassist Les Pattinson said "I like the songs, just hated the mixes"; and in 1995, McCulloch said "It still sounds crap."

== Release ==
After previewing the album with a short concert on top of the HMV shop on Oxford Street in London, Echo & the Bunnymen was first released on 6 July 1987 as an LP and CD, by Warner Bros. Records in the United Kingdom and elsewhere and by Sire Records in the United States. The album reached a peak of number four on the UK Albums Chart. The album became the band's most successful in the United States where it reached number fifty-one on the Billboard 200. The album also reached number fifty-one on the Canadian RPM 100 Albums chart and number twenty-two on the Swedish Albums Chart. It also entered into the top 30 albums chart in the Netherlands and New Zealand. The album has also been certified silver by the British Phonographic Industry (BPI) for having shipped more than 60,000 copies.

Three tracks from the album were released as singles. The first of these was "The Game", which was released on 1 June 1987. This was followed by "Lips Like Sugar", which was released in August 1987. The final single to be released from the album was "Bedbugs and Ballyhoo", which was also released before the year's end in the United States and Germany. "The Game" and "Lips Like Sugar" reached numbers 28 and 36 respectively on the UK Singles Chart.

Along with the other four of the band's first five studio albums, Echo & the Bunnymen was remastered and reissued on CD in 2003 – these were released for the band's twenty-fifth anniversary. Seven bonus tracks were added to the album and included early versions of "Bring On the Dancing Horses" (titled "Jimmy Brown"), "The Game" and "Bedbugs and Ballyhoo". Also included was a cover version of the Doors' "Soul Kitchen", an extended version of "Bring on the Dancing Horses" and the previously unreleased track "Hole in the Holy". The reissued album was produced by Andy Zax and Bill Inglot and released by Rhino Entertainment.

== Critical reception ==
Professional ratings
Review scores
Source	Rating
AllMusic	4.5/5 stars
Blender	2/5 stars
Pitchfork	7.6/10
Record Mirror	3/5 stars

In his 1987 review of the album for Rolling Stone magazine, music journalist J. D. Considine described Latham's production of the album as "ineffectual" and "well mannered". He went on say that there was no "anxious energy or knife-edged irony that made the group's earlier albums so compelling". He finishes his review by saying the album is "as vacant as it is pretty". Reviewing the 2003 remastered album, Andrew Harrison for Blender magazine's website said, "Egomania and off-message electronics experiments sank their eponymous 1987 comedown..." Taking a more positive stance in a retrospective review, David Cleary for AllMusic describes the album as "the hookiest and most memorable the band would ever write". Having described de Freitas's drumming as solid and veering toward the danceable, and McCulloch's singing as "restrained and tasteful", Cleary added that "The production values were excellent, with many subtle touches that do not detract from the album's overall directness." Although he stated that the production "watered the band's sound down", Joe Tangari for Pitchfork said, "The band's attempt to reach a wider audience worked out."

== Track listing ==
All tracks are written by Will Sergeant, Ian McCulloch and Les Pattinson, except where noted.

No.	Title	Writer(s)	Length
1.	"The Game"		3:50
2.	"Over You"		4:01
3.	"Bedbugs and Ballyhoo"	Sergeant, McCulloch, Pattinson, Pete de Freitas	3:28
4.	"All in Your Mind"	Sergeant, McCulloch, Pattinson, de Freitas	4:32
5.	"Bombers Bay"		4:22
6.	"Lips Like Sugar"		4:52
7.	"Lost and Found"		3:37
8.	"New Direction"		4:45
9.	"Blue Blue Ocean"		5:08
10.	"Satellite"	Sergeant, McCulloch, Pattinson, de Freitas	3:04
11.	"All My Life"		4:07
Total length:			45:46

Additional tracks

2003 Bonus tracks

No.	Title	Writer(s)	Length
12.	"Jimmy Brown"	Sergeant, McCulloch, Pattinson, de Freitas	4:07
13.	"Hole in the Holy"		4:44
14.	"Soul Kitchen"	Jim Morrison, Robby Krieger, Ray Manzarek, John Densmore	3:56
15.	"The Game" (demo)		3:57
16.	"Bedbugs and Ballyhoo" (early version)	Sergeant, McCulloch, Pattinson, de Freitas	3:41
17.	"Over Your Shoulder"		4:10
18.	"Bring On the Dancing Horses" (extended mix)	Sergeant, McCulloch, Pattinson, de Freitas	5:50

== Personnel ==
Echo & the Bunnymen

- Ian McCulloch – vocals, guitar
- Will Sergeant – guitar
- Les Pattinson – bass guitar
- Pete de Freitas – drums

Additional musicians

- Henry Priestman – keyboards
- Jake Brockman – keyboards
- Ray Manzarek – keyboards ("Bedbugs and Ballyhoo")
- Stephen Morris – drums ("Soul Kitchen")

Technical

- Laurie Latham – producer
- Bruce Lampcov – mixing
- Alex Haas – mixing assistant
- Don Rodenbach – mixing assistant
- Paul Gomersall – engineering
- Stuart Barry – engineering
- Brian Gardner – mastering
- Anton Corbijn – photography
- Gil Norton – producer ("All My Life" and "Soul Kitchen")
- Echo & the Bunnymen – producer ("All My Life" and "Soul Kitchen")
- Andy Zax – producer (reissue)
- Bill Inglot – producer (reissue)
- Rachel Gutek – cover design (reissue)

== Charts ==
Chart (1987)	Peak position
Australian Albums (Kent Music Report)	70
Canada Top Albums/CDs (RPM)	51
Dutch Albums (Album Top 100)	30
Finnish Albums (The Official Finnish Charts)	36
New Zealand Albums (RMNZ)	26
Swedish Albums (Sverigetopplistan)	22
UK Albums (Official Charts)	4
US Billboard 200	51

== Certifications ==
Region	Certification	Certified units/sales
United Kingdom (BPI)	Silver	60,000^{^}
^{^} Shipments figures based on certification alone.
