= The Moon Shines Bright =

English folk song

Song
- Genre: English folk song

"The Moon Shines Bright" carol is an English folk song which has been recorded by The Valley Folk, Shirley Collins, Ram's Bottom, and Sam Lee (in collaboration with Elizabeth Fraser) and The Furrow Collective

Being a well-documented song publicised by EFDSS, Mudcat, and Mainly Norfolk, the song was recorded by Jon Boden and Oli Steadman for inclusion in their respective lists of daily folk songs "A Folk Song a Day" and "365 Days of Folk".

It is also used as a religious hymn.

== History ==
Lucy Broadwood found two versions of "The Moon Shines Bright" in 1893:

- A May Day Song: Collected in Weston, near Hitchin.
- A New Year Carol: Collected in Sussex and Surrey.
