= Jake Drake-Brockman =

British musician (1955–2009)

- Also known as: Fifth Bunnyman
- Born: James Ralph Drake-Brockman; 18 November 1955; Borneo
- Origin: Bristol, England
- Died: 1 September 2009 (aged 53) Isle of Man
- Instruments: Keyboards, guitar

James Ralph "Jake" Drake-Brockman (18 November 1955 – 1 September 2009) was a Bristol-based English musician and sound recordist. Drake-Brockman was known to fans as "the fifth Bunnyman", as he had been associated with the Liverpool group Echo & the Bunnymen since the 1980s and became a full-time member, as keyboardist, in 1989, using the professional name Jake Brockman.

== Life ==
James Ralph Drake-Brockman was born in Borneo in 1955. He studied at the Bristol Old Vic Theatre School. A keen musician, he formed BOM, a dance band, with fellow Bristol-based musician Damon Reece. Drake-Brockman toured with Echo & the Bunnymen for several years in the eighties, and played on their 1984 single "Seven Seas" and their 1987 Echo & the Bunnymen album. In 1989 he joined the band as a full-time member as keyboard player. He played on the 1990 album Reverberation.

From 2004 onwards, Drake-Brockman worked as a sound recordist, mainly for the BBC's Natural History Unit on several projects, including Last Chance to See, Coast and British Isles: A Natural History. During filming of Everest: Beyond the Limit, Drake-Brockman lost 18% of his body weight, a record among the crew members.

Drake-Brockman married photographer Sally A. Mundy in 2004. He maintained his interest in music, playing in the band The Hook 'Em Boys along with Sean Cook (Spiritualized, Lupine Howl), Alex Lee (Goldfrapp, Placebo), Damon Reece (Echo & the Bunnymen, Massive Attack) and John Baggot (Portishead, Massive Attack, Robert Plant).

Drake-Brockman was a classic motorcycle enthusiast, and died on the Isle of Man on 1 September 2009 while visiting the island for the Manx Grand Prix, when the BSA motorcycle he was riding was in collision with a converted ambulance. The inquest into his death was opened and adjourned on 10 September; the full inquest was delayed until police enquiries into the accident were completed. He was the second member of Echo and the Bunnymen to die as a result of a motorcycle accident, the band's original drummer, Pete de Freitas having died under similar circumstances 20 years earlier).

In November 2009, Cocteau Twins singer Elizabeth Fraser released her first solo single "Moses" as a tribute to Drake-Brockman, who had been a close friend.
