= Voyager One (band) =

- Origin: Seattle, Washington, U.S.
- Genres: Indie rock, shoegazing, space rock, post-rock, experimental rock, electronic
- Years active: 1998–2011
- Labels: Loveless, Arnold, Tokyoidaho
- Past members: Jeramy Koepping; Peter Marchese; Dayna Loeffler; John Hollis; Tony Zuniga; Cody Burns; Matthew Campbell; Rick Lewis; Jasun Hadaway; Elliott Nutt; Dallas Guier; Bo Gilliland; Peter Kerrick

Voyager One was an American indie rock band from Seattle, Washington formed in 1998. AllMusic compared the band's musical style to the shoegazing music played by Ride, Swervedriver and Catherine Wheel.

== Band history ==
The band was formed in late 1998 by guitarist Jeramy Koepping and Peter Marchese on guitar and vocals. They recruited bassist Dayna Loeffler and a series of drummers before John Hollis joined the band. The band recorded a demo record Zeroes and Ones, Parts One and Two in 1999, which received airplay on Seattle independent radio station KCMU (now KEXP) leading to the band being signed to Loveless Records.

Their debut record From the New Nation of Long Shadows was released in 2000. Monster Zero followed in 2002 on Loveless Records, then followed by Dissolver on Tokyoidaho Records in 2005, and Afterhours in the Afterlife on Loveless Records in 2008. Several EPs have also been released as well as appearing on various compilations.

Voyager One live shows typically included visual effects from several 16mm film projectors operated by Projectorhead. The projectors show spliced-together clips of salvaged short films on the wall behind the band. Projectorhead collects the source material for and assembles the films. Two video recordings of Projectorhead's work have been released on DVD, Shadows and Daydreams and Magic Time Bomb.

Voyager One toured the U.S. west coast several times and toured the southeast states with Black Rebel Motorcycle Club on their Howl tour in 2006. The band also made several trips to festivals such as CMJ in New York City and SXSW in Austin.

Voyager One went on an indefinite hiatus in 2011. At that time, the line-up included Jasun Hadaway and Elliott Nutt. Peter Marchese, Jasun Hadaway, and Elliott Nutt then formed a new band, Tokyoidaho.

Jeramy Koepping, who had started the band Grand Hallway with Tomo Nakayama in 2007, continued working with that band until 2011. He now works with Matthew Emerson Brown (Trespassers William) and Joshua Morrison to score films and release music under the name St Kilda.

Jasun Hadaway and former drummer Tony Zuniga are currently members of Seattle band, Black Nite Crash.

== Band members ==
The following musicians were members of Voyager One at various times:

- Jeramy Koepping – guitar, bass, keyboards, loops, vocals
- Peter Marchese – guitar, vocals, bass, keyboards, drums, loops
- Dayna Loeffler – bass
- John Hollis – drums
- Tony Zuniga – drums
- Cody Burns – bass
- Matthew Campbell – keyboards
- Rick Lewis – keyboards
- Jasun Hadaway – keyboards, sequencers
- Elliott Nutt – drums
- Dallas Guier – bass
- Bo Gilliland – bass
- Peter Kerrick – drums

== Discography ==
Studio albums

- From the New Nation of Long Shadows (2000, Loveless)
- Monster Zero (2002, Loveless)
- Dissolver (2005, Tokyoidaho)
- Afterhours in the Afterlife (2008, Loveless)

Demos and EPs

- Zeroes and Ones, Parts One and Two (1999, Self-released)
- The Magic Garden EP (2002, Arnold)
- Bed of Sound EP (2007, Tokyoidaho)
- Reassembled EP (2009, Tokyoidaho)
- Geography EP (2010, Tokyoidaho)
