= Ballyhoo (South African band) =

Ballyhoo is a South African musical group, who had a charts-topping hit in South Africa in 1981 with "Man on the Moon", which spent 19 weeks on the charts.

The band was formed in Johannesburg in 1974. The original line-up consisted of:

- Derrick Dryan - vocals
- Attie van Wyk - keyboards
- Mick Matthews - guitar and vocals
- Fergie Ferguson - bass and vocals
- Cedric Samson - drums

The current line-up is a three-piece:

- Ashley Brokensha
- Derrick Dryan
- Fergie Ferguson

== Discography ==
- Ballyhoo (1976)
- Standing Room Only (1977)
- Man On The Moon (1981)
- Ballyhoo Too (1982)
- Alive (1989)
