= Ballyhoo (video game) =

1985 video game

- Developer: Infocom
- Publisher: Infocom
- Designer: Jeff O'Neill
- Engine: Z-machine
- Platforms: Amiga, Amstrad CPC, Apple II, Atari 8-bit, Atari ST, Commodore 64, MS-DOS, Mac, TI-99/4A, TRS-80, TRS-80 Color Computer
- Release: December 18, 1985
- Genre: Interactive fiction
- Mode: Single-player

Ballyhoo is an interactive fiction game designed by Jeff O'Neill and published by Infocom in 1985. The circus-themed game was released for ten systems, including MS-DOS, Atari ST, and Commodore 64. Ballyhoo was labeled as "Standard" difficulty. It is Infocom's nineteenth game.

== Plot ==
The player's character is bedazzled by the spectacle of the circus and the mystery of the performer's life. After attending a show of Tomas Munrab's "The Travelling Circus That Time Forgot", the player loiters near the tents instead of rushing through the exit. Maybe some clowns will practice a new act, or perhaps at least one of the trapeze artists will trip...

Instead, the player overhears a strange conversation. The circus' owner has hired a drunken, inept detective to find his daughter Chelsea, who has been kidnapped. Munrab is convinced that it was an outside job; surely his loyal employees would never betray him like this!

As the player begins to investigate the abduction, it soon becomes clear that the circus workers don't appreciate the intrusion. Their reactions range from indifference to hostility to attempted murder. In order to unravel the mystery, the player engages in a series of actions straight out of a circus fan's dream: dressing up as a clown, walking the high wire, and taming lions.

== Release ==
Packaging details ("feelies")

Ballyhoo included the following physical items in the package:

1. An "Official Souvenir Program" from The Traveling Circus That Time Forgot describing each of the featured acts and listing common circus slang
2. A ticket to the circus
3. A toy balloon imprinted with the circus' name and logo (blue was the most common color, although a few orange or black ones were also shipped)
4. A trade card for "Dr. Nostrum's Extract", a fictitious patent medicine hailed as a "wondrous curative" containing 19% alcohol

== Reception ==
Compute!'s Gazette in 1986 called Ballyhoo "richly evocative, often exasperating, and very clever". The magazine approved of the splendid feelies and "surprisingly flexible" parser. Noting its difficulty, Antic concluded that it "supplies enough escapist entertainment to make it seem as if you have [run away to the circus]".

== Legacy ==
The Lost Treasures of Infocom bundled 20 Infocom releases, including Ballyhoo. This package as shipped lacked some information necessary to complete the game; the final page of the souvenir program was omitted. This page was an ad for a classical music radio station; at one point in the game, the player must tune a radio to the frequency listed in the ad (AM 1170) in order to proceed.
