= Bone Detectives =

American television series

Bone Detectives is a television series that made its debut on The Discovery Channel on December 29, 2007, at 10 p.m. Eastern time/ 9 p.m. Central time. Afterward, its regular timeslot became Mondays at 10 p.m., starting on January 14, 2008. It is also shown on Discovery Channel (Canada) Fridays at 9 p.m. An article on the series states that it "will follow teams of scientists and explorers as they attempt to unlock the secrets of burial and mummification... Archaeologist Scotty Moore and Discovery Channel Producer Tom Golden from Hot Springs, Arkansas will lead each of Bone Detective's expeditions, which will explore the burial techniques used by some of the world's most ancient civilizations. Billed as a mix of 'anthropology and adventure,' Bone Detectives will also use the burial techniques to reveal portions of the past that have since been forgotten."
