= Paper & Glue (film) =

2021 film directed by JR

- Theatrical release poster
- Directed by: JR
- Produced by: Sara Bernstein; Justin Wilkes; Dallas Brennan; Marc Azoulay
- Starring: JR
- Edited by: Keiko Deguchi
- Music by: Adam Peters
- Production companies: Impact Partners; Imagine Documentaries; Shark Island Productions; Time Studio; Artemis Rising Foundation; Chicago Media Project
- Distributed by: MSNBC Films; Abramorama (United States); Universal Sony Pictures Home Entertainment (Australia)
- Release dates: June 19, 2021 (Tribeca); December 10, 2021 (United States)
- Running time: 95 minutes
- Countries: United States; Australia; France; Mexico; Brazil
- Language: English

Paper & Glue is a 2021 American documentary film, directed by JR. It follows JR's intention of giving a global voice to everyday people through art. Brian Grazer and Ron Howard serve as executive producers under their Imagine Documentaries banner.

It had its world premiere at the Tribeca Film Festival on June 19, 2021. It premiered on December 10, 2021, by MSNBC Films and Abramorama.

== Synopsis ==
The film follows artist JR giving a global voice to everyday people through art.

== Production ==
In April 2021, it was announced JR had directed and starred in a documentary film revolving around his art, with Ron Howard set to executive produce under his Imagine Documentaries banner, with Impact Partners, Artemis Rising Foundation, Shark Island Productions, Time Studio, Chicago Media Project producing.

== Release ==
MSNBC Films acquired distribution rights to the film in June 2021. The Tribeca Film Festival hosted the world premiere of the film on June 19, 2021. It premiered on December 10, 2021.
