= Don't Let It Get You Down =

1997 single by Echo & the Bunnymen

- CD#1 cover

Single by Echo & the Bunnymen

from the album Evergreen
- Released: November 1997
- Genre: Alternative rock
- Length: 3:53 (CD#1); 3:54 (CD#2)
- Label: London
- Songwriters: Will Sergeant, Ian McCulloch, Les Pattinson
- Producer: Echo & the Bunnymen

Echo & the Bunnymen singles chronology
"I Want to Be There" (1997)	"Don't Let It Get You Down" (1997)	"(How Does It Feel to Be) On Top of the World" (1998)

CD#2 cover

7" single cover

"Don't Let It Get You Down" is a single by Echo & the Bunnymen which was released in November 1997. It was the third single released after Ian McCulloch, Will Sergeant and Les Pattinson reformed the band. It was also the third single to be released from their 1997 album, Evergreen. It reached number 50 on the UK Singles Chart.

== Overview ==
Like their previous two singles, "Nothing Lasts Forever" and "I Want to Be There", the single was released on London Records as a 7-inch single and as two separate CD versions – apart from the title track all three releases had different track listings and each with a different cover.

The B-side to the 7-inch single is a demo version of the title track and the extra tracks of both CDs are live tracks taken from their 1997 appearance at the Glastonbury Festival.

Written by Will Sergeant, Ian McCulloch and Les Pattinson, the title track was also self-produced by the band. It was mixed by Clif Norrell. The photography for the CD covers was done by Norman Watson.

== Track listings ==
All tracks written by Will Sergeant, Ian McCulloch and Les Pattinson except where noted.

7-inch release (London LON406 and 570 044-7)

1. "Don't Let It Get You Down"
2. "Don't Let It Get You Down" (demo version)

CD No. 1 release (London LONCD406)

1. "Don't Let It Get You Down" – 3:53
2. "Rescue" (live) (Sergeant, McCulloch, Pattinson, Pete de Freitas) – 4:04
3. "Altamont" (live) (Sergeant, McCulloch, Pattinson, de Freitas) – 3:37

CD No. 2 release (London LOCDP406)

1. "Don't Let It Get You Down" – 3:54
2. "The Back of Love" (live) (Sergeant, McCulloch, Pattinson, de Freitas) – 3:10
3. "Over the Wall" (live) (Sergeant, McCulloch, Pattinson, de Freitas) – 6:55

== Chart positions ==
Chart (1997)	Peak position
UK Singles Chart	50

== Personnel ==
=== Musicians ===
- Ian McCulloch – vocals, guitar
- Will Sergeant – lead guitar
- Les Pattinson – bass

=== Production ===
- Echo & the Bunnymen – producer
- Clif Norrell – mixed by
- Norman Watson – photography
