= Ocean Rain =

1984 album by Echo & the Bunnymen

Coordinates: 50.4726°N 4.5565°W

Studio album by Echo & the Bunnymen
- Released: 4 May 1984
- Recorded: 1983–1984
- Studios: Studio des Dames, Paris; Studio Davout, Paris; Crescent Studio, Bath; Amazon Studios, Liverpool
- Genres: Post-punk; new wave; neo-psychedelia; symphonic rock; orchestral pop
- Length: 36:36
- Label: Korova
- Producers: Echo & the Bunnymen; Gil Norton; Henri Loustau

Echo & the Bunnymen chronology
| Porcupine (1983) | Ocean Rain (1984) | Echo & the Bunnymen (1987) |

Singles from Ocean Rain
- 1. "The Killing Moon" Released: 20 January 1984; 2. "Silver" Released: 13 April 1984; 3. "Seven Seas" Released: 6 July 1984

Ocean Rain is the fourth studio album by the English post-punk band Echo & the Bunnymen. It was released on 4 May 1984 by Korova and reached number four on the UK Albums Chart, number 87 on the United States Billboard 200, number 41 on the Canadian RPM 100 Albums and number 22 on the Swedish chart. Since 1984 the album has been certified gold by the British Phonographic Industry. Ocean Rain includes the singles "The Killing Moon", "Silver" and "Seven Seas".

The band wrote the songs for the new album in 1983. In early 1984 they recorded most of the album in Paris using a 35-piece orchestra, with other sessions taking place in Bath and Liverpool. Receiving mixed reviews upon release but retrospectively praised, the album was originally released as an LP and a cassette in May 1984 before it was reissued on CD in August. The album was reissued on CD in 2003, along with the other four of the band's first five studio albums, having been remastered and expanded before again being reissued in 2008 with a live bonus disc. The artwork for the album was designed by Martyn Atkins and the photography was by Brian Griffin. Echo & the Bunnymen played a number of concerts in 2008 where they performed Ocean Rain in full and with the backing of an orchestra.

== Background ==
Following the poor reception of Echo & the Bunnymen's third album, 1983's Porcupine, the band recorded the single "Never Stop". The title track of the single was produced by Hugh Jones, who had produced the band's second album, 1981's Heaven Up Here. The single introduced a new sound for the band with an expanded arrangement including congas, marimbas, violins and cellos. After "Never Stop" was released on 8 July 1983 the band toured the Outer Hebrides in Scotland before two successful concerts at the Royal Albert Hall in London on 18 and 19 July. Also that month, the band was filmed by RPM Productions for the Channel 4 documentary series Play at Home. Filmed in a café used by the band they recorded acoustic versions of two old songs, "Stars Are Stars" and "Villiers Terrace", as well as two new songs, "The Killing Moon" and "Silver", for their episode of Play at Home titled "Life at Brian's".

After spending some time in Liverpool writing new songs for the album, the band recorded their sixth session for John Peel's radio show on BBC Radio 1 on 6 September 1983. The songs recorded were "Nocturnal Me", "Ocean Rain", "My Kingdom" and "Watch Out Below", which would all later appear on the band's fourth album Ocean Rain – "Watch Out Below" was later renamed "The Yo Yo Man". When the band's John Peel session was broadcast on 10 October 1983, the punk zine Jamming said, "[The songs] hint at a readjustment and a period of new positive recovery."

Echo & the Bunnymen were booked to headline a two-week youth festival at the Royal Shakespeare Theatre in Stratford-upon-Avon on the evening of 23 October 1983. Due to a high demand for tickets a matinee performance was added. The matinee concert at Stratford-upon-Avon saw the live debut of "Seven Seas". With representatives from the band's record company and lead singer Ian McCulloch's mother in the audience, the performance was nervous and uncertain; although the evening performance, without the record company representatives and McCulloch's mother, was much improved.

At the end of 1983 Echo & the Bunnymen recorded a live special called A Crystal Day for the Channel 4 programme The Tube. Ignoring their old material, the band played "The Killing Moon", "Nocturnal Me", "Ocean Rain" – which had now developed into a ballad – and an early version of "Thorn of Crowns" called "Cucumber".

== Recording and music ==
The band recorded and self-produced "The Killing Moon" – which was released on 20 January 1984 – at Crescent Studio in Bath, Somerset. After catching a cold, McCulloch completed the recording of the vocals for the song at Amazon Studio in Liverpool, where Pete de Freitas also completed the drumming. The band then went to Paris where they were booked into Les Studios des Dames and Studio Davout. Henri Loustau, the engineer at des Dames, assisted on the string passages and Adam Peters provided the string arrangements and played cello and piano. McCulloch, not happy with the lead vocals he had recorded in Paris, re-recorded most of the vocals at Amazon Studio in Liverpool.

Continuing the band's prominent use of strings – which began with the 1982 single "The Back of Love" – the group recorded Ocean Rain using a 35-piece orchestra. Lead guitarist Will Sergeant said, "We wanted to make something conceptual with lush orchestration; not Mantovani, something with a twist. It's all pretty dark. 'Thorn of Crowns' is based on an eastern scale. The whole mood is very windswept: European pirates, a bit Ben Gunn; dark and stormy, battering rain; all of that." Kristen Blanton of Paste Magazine said that "Ocean Rain’s expansive string arrangements allowed McCulloch to sooth his metaphysical melodies into a portrait of lush eroticism." During recording De Freitas used xylophones and glockenspiels in addition to his usual percussion, bass player Les Pattinson used an old reverb machine at des Dames and Sergeant's solo on "My Kingdom" was played using a Washburn acoustic guitar which he distorted through a valve radio.

== Artwork ==
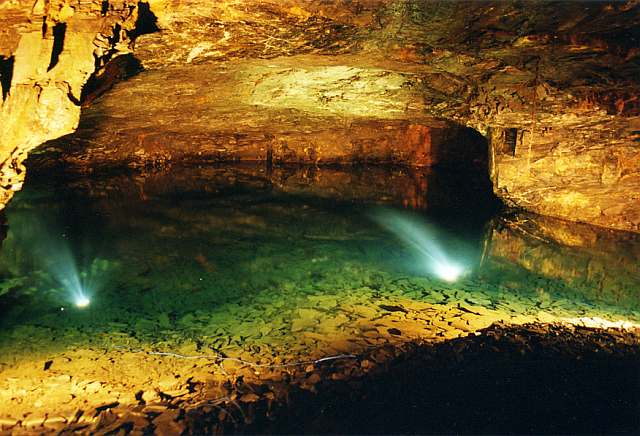
Carnglaze Caverns in Cornwall, where the cover photo for Ocean Rain was shot.

As with their previous albums, the album cover was designed by Martyn Atkins and the photography was by Brian Griffin. With the band wanting to continue the elemental theme of the previous three albums, the photograph used on the front cover of the album is a picture of the band in a rowing boat which was taken inside Carnglaze Caverns, Liskeard, Cornwall. In his 2002 book Turquoise Days: The Weird World of Echo & the Bunnymen, author Chris Adams describes the cover as "a perfect visual representation of arguably the Bunnymen's finest album".

The picture on the front cover of the original album was kept for the 2003 reissue. However, the design was altered slightly by graphic designer Rachel Gutek of the design company guppyart. This release contains an expanded booklet written by music journalist Max Bell giving the background to the album. The booklet contains a number of photographs which are credited to Sergeant and Pattinson.

== Releases ==
Ocean Rain was first released on 4 May 1984 as an LP and on cassette by Korova in Europe. It was subsequently released by Sire Records in the United States on 14 May and on CD in Europe and the United States on 24 August 1984. The album was marketed as "the greatest album ever made" and McCulloch later said it was because they believed it was, although he later claimed it was meant as a joke: "That wasn't my idea! I was on the phone to [Rob Dickins, managing director of Warner Bros.], just joshing and I said 'Oh, it's the greatest album ever made.' And he used it on the poster." In a 2005 interview for Record Collector magazine, Sergeant asked, "Why not?". After wondering "what all the fuss was about", he went on to ask, "Doesn't every band think that way when they've got a new record out?"

Along with the other four of the band's first five albums, Ocean Rain was remastered and reissued on CD in 2003—these releases were marketed as 25th anniversary editions. Eight bonus tracks were added to the album: "Angels and Devils", which had been recorded at The Automatt in San Francisco, was the B-side to the single "Silver" and was produced by The Bunnymen and Alan Perman; five Life at Brian's – Lean and Hungry tracks ("All You Need Is Love", "The Killing Moon", "Stars Are Stars", "Villiers Terrace" and "Silver"), which had been recorded for the Channel 4 programme Play at Home; and two live tracks ("My Kingdom" and "Ocean Rain"), which were recorded for A Crystal Day, a Channel 4 special for The Tube. The Life at Brian's – Lean and Hungry track, "Silver", and the two A Crystal Day tracks had previously been unreleased. The 2003 reissue was produced by Andy Zax and Bill Inglot.

A collector's edition was released in October 2008 which, while still including "Angels and Devils", replaced the bonus tracks of the 25th anniversary edition with the extended 12-inch single versions of "Silver" and "The Killing Moon". The collector's edition also includes a bonus disc containing a recording of the band's 1983 Royal Albert Hall concert, omitting only two encore tracks, "Heroin" and "Do It Clean", which are included on the Crystal Days box set.

Three tracks from the original Ocean Rain album were released as singles: "The Killing Moon", released on 20 January 1984; "Silver", released on 13 April 1984; and "Seven Seas", released on 6 July 1984. This was the first time Echo & the Bunnymen had released more than two singles from one album.

== Critical reception ==
The album was released to mixed reviews. Describing Echo & the Bunnymen's change from the more rock sound of their previous albums to the lighter sound of Ocean Rain, music journalist Max Bell said in his 1984 review for The Times newspaper, "This time vocalist Ian McCulloch has tempered his metaphysical songs with a romantic sweetness and the band's melodies are more to the fore. Acoustic guitars, brushes and sparingly used keyboards all add to the album's optimistic warmth and there is a consistency of atmosphere in songs like 'Seven Seas' and 'Silver', the current single, which justifies the departure."

However, Parke Puterbaugh of Rolling Stone rated the album two out of five stars and described it as "too often a monochromatic dirge of banal existential imagery cloaked around the mere skeleton of a musical idea". While finding that the album had some "nifty choruses and nice atmospheres", he went on to say it "evinces too little melodic development and too much tortured soul-gazing". In his 1984 review for NME, Biba Kopf said, "... Ocean Rain has been designed to buttress the notion of the group's importance. Not unnaturally the results have the opposite effect." He went on to criticise McCulloch's lyrics, which he described as "tired juxtapositions of mysterious buzzwords, nonsense, and banality", and the music, "mellotron-style wash of strings and bleating wood winds".

Ocean Rain reached number four on the UK Albums Chart in its first week of release and stayed on the chart for 26 weeks. In the United States it entered the Billboard 200 at number 172 on 9 June 1984 and stayed on the chart for 11 weeks, reaching a peak of number 87. It entered the Canadian RPM 100 Albums chart at number 89 before it reached a peak of number 41. Staying on the Swedish chart for three weeks the album reached a peak of number 22. As of 1984, Ocean Rain has been certified gold by the British Phonographic Industry for having sold more than 100,000 copies.

Of the singles from the album; "The Killing Moon", which was released on 20 January 1984, reached number nine on the UK Singles Chart and number seven on the Irish Singles Chart; "Silver", released on 13 April 1984, reached number 30 on the UK Singles Chart and number 14 on the Irish Singles Chart; and "Seven Seas", released on 6 July 1984, reached number 16 on the UK Singles Chart and number 10 on the Irish Singles Chart.

== Legacy ==
Retrospective professional ratings
Review scores
| Source | Rating |
|---|---|
| AllMusic | 5/5 stars |
| Blender | 4/5 stars |
| Classic Pop | 4.5/5 stars |
| The Guardian | 4/5 stars |
| Mojo | 4/5 stars |
| Pitchfork | 8.6/10 |
| Q | 4/5 stars |
| Record Collector | 5/5 stars |
| The Rolling Stone Album Guide | 3.5/5 stars |
| Uncut | 9/10 |

Over the years since its release, the album has attracted more positive commentary and also sometimes more nuanced views. In a highly praising retrospective review on AllMusic, Jason Ankeny gave the album a 5-star rating. He described it as "dramatic and majestic", praising the "sweeping string arrangements and hauntingly evocative production." He felt that in comparison to the band's previous studio album Porcupine, the "conventional and simple structural parameters" of Ocean Rain made it Echo & the Bunnymen's "most beautiful and memorable effort" and he asserted that "The Killing Moon" was the band's "unrivalled pinnacle".

"The Killing Moon" is featured in the original theatrical version of the opening sequence of the 2001 cult film Donnie Darko. However, in the director's cut version of the film, the song is replaced by INXS's "Never Tear Us Apart", with "The Killing Moon" being placed later in the movie.

When reissued in 2003, Andrew Harrison in Blender described the album as "a portrait of splendid derangement with spectacular orchestrations". Keith Cameron of Mojo said the album had "effervescent songs, sympathetically orchestrated". Pitchfork critic Joe Tangari found that on Ocean Rain, the band had "mellowed to a degree... but all it did was cause them to get weirder"; he described the album as "stuffed with queasy midtempo tracks and bizarre orchestration", yet also "by no means impenetrable", concluding that "a chilly, haunted ambience settles over the whole recording like a fine dust."

In his 2005 book Rip It Up and Start Again: Post Punk 1978–1984, British music journalist Simon Reynolds describes the album as "lush, orchestrated and [...] overtly erotic". Mark Blacklock, in Robert Dimery's 1001 Albums You Must Hear Before You Die, wrote that the album's confidence, lush strings, romance, warmth and poetry means that "it stands the test of time better than any other Bunnymen album".

"Ocean Rain stood out for me as a unique and special album the first time I heard it. It captured a great band at the perfect moment and has a lasting, timeless quality which still reverberates in every song."

— Ian Broudie

Reviewing the collector's edition for the BBC, Chris Jones described the album as both "the last truly great record they made" and "the point where the cracks began to show, but were masked with such beauty as to hardly matter". Jones went on to say how the 35-piece orchestra helped on tracks such as "Nocturnal Me" but made others, such as "The Yo-Yo Man", "flounder under the weight of intrusive arrangements". Adam Sweeting wrote that Ocean Rain was "only half a classic album", adding: "If you picture it in its original LP format, side two is superb, while side one sounds like a few extra songs they hastily knocked off to go with it".

In 2013, NME ranked Ocean Rain at number 276 in its list of the 500 Greatest Albums of All Time.

In the first season of Stranger Things, the fifth episode, "The Flea and Acrobat" featured "Nocturnal Me" in the end credits. The Swedish heavy metal band Ghost covered "Nocturnal Me" for their 2016 Popestar EP, which consisted mainly of cover versions. Also in 2016, Kristen Blanton of Paste Magazine said the album was "a voyage in sonic proportions." She said: "Cleverly chaotic, the album capitalizes on the rolling blankets of warmth that soon follow an ocean rain."

== Ocean Rain tour ==
The poster used to advertise the Royal Albert Hall concert

On 16 September 2008, Echo & the Bunnymen played a concert at the Royal Albert Hall in London playing the album with the backing of a 16-piece orchestra. Two similar concerts subsequently took place at Radio City in New York City on 1 October 2008 and at the Liverpool Arena on 27 November 2008. These concerts were played with a 10-piece orchestra which was conducted by Rupert Christie. The posters used to advertise the concerts have the image of the band from the cover of the album overlaying an image of the venue. Further concerts took place in Europe and North America during 2009.

The concerts were received well. Simon O'Hagan, reviewing the London concert in The Independent, described it as "a moving, memorable evening" and went on to describe McCulloch's voice as "torn silk" and "magnificent". Giving the London concert five out of five stars, Angus Batey, writing in The Guardian, described "The Killing Moon" as a "dizzying high" which was "topped by 'Ocean Rain' itself, where the strings are held back until the end of the second verse so that they hit with a euphoric punch of almost physical intensity, sunny melodic optimism piercing the lyrics' chiaroscuro of storm clouds and 'blackest thoughts'." However, Adam Sweeting, for The Daily Telegraph, said the orchestra "often didn't add much beyond a vague sonic sludge".

Reviewing the New York concert for Rolling Stone, Jim Allen described Radio City as an "appropriately dramatic, grandiose setting", and added that McCulloch "was in fine voice, growling and sneering wondrously". Reviewing the Liverpool concert, Jade Wright wrote in the Liverpool Echo that McCulloch "was on form – one part Lou Reed, one part Oliver Reed, with a bit of Jim Morrison thrown in for good measure."

== Track listing ==
All tracks written by Will Sergeant, Ian McCulloch, Les Pattinson and Pete de Freitas except where noted.

Original album

1. "Silver" – 3:22
2. "Nocturnal Me" – 4:57
3. "Crystal Days" – 2:24
4. "The Yo Yo Man" – 3:10
5. "Thorn of Crowns" – 4:52
6. "The Killing Moon" – 5:50
7. "Seven Seas" – 3:20
8. "My Kingdom" – 4:05
9. "Ocean Rain" – 5:12

2003 bonus tracks

10. "Angels and Devils" – 4:34
11. "All You Need Is Love" (Lennon–McCartney) – 6:44
12. "The Killing Moon" (live) – 3:27
13. "Stars are Stars" (live) – 3:07
14. "Villiers Terrace" (live) – 6:00
15. "Silver" (live) – 3:22
16. "My Kingdom" (live) – 4:01
17. "Ocean Rain" (live) – 5:18

2008 bonus tracks

10. "Angels and Devils" – 4:23
11. "Silver (Tidal Wave)" – 5:11
12. "The Killing Moon (All Night Version)" – 9:11

2008 bonus disc

1. "Going Up/With A Hip" – 5:14
2. "Villiers Terrace" – 3:12
3. "All That Jazz" – 2:47
4. "Heads Will Roll" – 3:57
5. "Porcupine" – 4:07
6. "All My Colours (Zimbo)" – 4:12
7. "Silver" – 3:21
8. "Simple Stuff" – 2:38
9. "The Cutter" – 3:40
10. "The Killing Moon" – 3:02
11. "Rescue" – 4:06
12. "Never Stop" – 4:37
13. "The Back of Love" – 3:14
14. "No Dark Things" – 3:35
15. "Heaven Up Here" – 3:54
16. "Over the Wall" – 6:51
17. "Crocodiles" – 7:00

== Personnel ==
Echo and the Bunnymen

- Ian McCulloch – vocals
- Will Sergeant – guitar, harpsichord ("Angels and Devils"), sitar (Life at Brian's sessions)
- Les Pattinson – bass
- Pete de Freitas – drums

Additional musicians

- Adam Peters – piano, cello
- Alan Perman – harpsichord (Life at Brian's sessions)
- Luvan Kiem – clarinet (Life at Brian's sessions)

Production

- The Bunnymen – producer, mixing
- Gil Norton – producer, engineer, mixing
- Henri Loustau – producer, engineer
- Jean-Yves – assistant engineer
- Adam Peters – orchestral arrangements
- David Lord – recorded by ("The Killing Moon")
- Brian Griffin – photography
- Martyn Atkins – cover design
- Andy Zax – producer (reissue)
- Bill Inglot – producer (reissue), remastering (reissue)
- Dan Hersch – remastering (reissue)
- Alan Perman – producer ("Angels and Devils")
- David Frazer – engineer ("Angels and Devils")
- Rachel Gutek – cover design (reissue)

== Charts ==
| Chart (1984) | Peak position |
|---|---|
| Australian Albums (Kent Music Report) | 58 |
| Canada Top Albums/CDs (RPM) | 41 |
| Dutch Albums (Album Top 100) | 49 |
| New Zealand Albums (RMNZ) | 10 |
| Swedish Albums (Sverigetopplistan) | 22 |
| UK Albums (Official Charts) | 4 |
| US Billboard 200 | 87 |

| Chart (2021) | Peak position |
|---|---|
| Scottish Albums (Official Charts) | 42 |

== Certifications ==
| Region | Certification | Certified units/sales |
|---|---|---|
| United Kingdom (BPI) | Gold | 100,000^{^} |
^{^} Shipments figures based on certification alone.
