= The Game (Echo & the Bunnymen song) =

1987 single by Echo & the Bunnymen

Single by Echo & the Bunnymen

from the album Echo & the Bunnymen
- B-side: "Lost and Found", "Ship of Fools"
- Released: 1 June 1987
- Genre: Post-punk, alternative rock
- Length: 3:50
- Label: WEA
- Songwriters: Will Sergeant, Ian McCulloch, Les Pattinson, Pete de Freitas
- Producer: Laurie Latham

Echo & the Bunnymen singles chronology
"Bring on the Dancing Horses" (1985)	"The Game" (1987)	"Lips Like Sugar" (1987)

"The Game" is a song by the English rock band Echo & the Bunnymen. It was released on 1 June 1987 as the first single from their eponymous album of that year; this reached number 28 on the UK singles chart.

The single was released on WEA Records in 7-inch and 12-inch formats. The B-side is "Lost and Found"; the additional track on the 12-inch single is "Ship of Fools", which was produced by the group and Gil Norton.

The video was shot in Rio de Janeiro, Brazil.

== Track listings ==
All tracks written by Will Sergeant, Ian McCulloch, Les Pattinson and Pete de Freitas.

7-inch (WEA YZ 134)

1. "The Game" – 3:50
2. "Lost and Found" – 3:52

12-inch release (WEA YZ 134T)

1. "The Game" – 3:50
2. "Lost and Found" – 3:52
3. "Ship of Fools" – 4:06

== Chart positions ==
Chart (1987)	Peak position
UK Singles Chart	28

== Personnel ==
=== Musicians ===
- Ian McCulloch – vocals, guitar
- Will Sergeant – lead guitar
- Les Pattinson – bass
- Pete de Freitas – drums

=== Production ===
- Laurie Latham – producer on "The Game" and "Lost and Found"
- The Bunnymen – producer on "Ship of Fools"
- Gil Norton – producer and engineer on "Ship of Fools"
- Paul Gomersall – engineer on "The Game" and "Lost and Found"
- Stuart Barry – engineer on "The Game" and "Lost and Found"
- Bruce Lampcov – mixing on "The Game" and "Lost and Found"
