= Lupine Howl =

English rock band

Lupine Howl were a rock band formed in Bristol, England in 1999, by Sean Cook (vocalist, bassist), Mike Mooney (guitarist) and Damon Reece (drummer). The three had been dismissed from their respective roles in Spiritualized by that band's frontman, Jason Pierce.

The first single, "Vaporizer" was released in 2000 on their own Vinyl Hiss record label. It peaked at No. 68 in the UK Singles Chart. This was followed by a deal with Beggars Banquet Records and an LP, The Carnivorous Lunar Activities of Lupine Howl in 2001. The Bar at the End of the World followed in 2002, with Jonny Mattock replacing Damon Reece on drums.

Cook now also records as The Flies releasing All Too Human in 2007, and Mooney works with the Wild Swans and Applecraft.

== Miscellanea ==
Lupine Howl spent some time working with fellow Bristolians Massive Attack in 2000, assisting them with recording sounds for their upcoming fourth album, which was eventually released as 100th Window in 2003. However, Massive Attack opted to not use any of the material from those sessions.

The band received some attention following their acrimonious split with Pierce, after Courtney Love had claimed Mike Mooney had taken her virginity while she followed The Teardrop Explodes in Liverpool in the 1980s, a claim which he denied.
