= Silver (Echo & the Bunnymen song) =

1984 single by Echo & the Bunnymen

Single by Echo & the Bunnymen

from the album Ocean Rain
- B-side: "Angels and Devils"
- Released: 13 April 1984
- Studio: Studio Des Dames, Paris; Amazon Studios, Liverpool; The Automat, San Francisco
- Genre: Post-punk; alternative rock
- Length: 3:19 (7"); 5:09 (12")
- Label: Korova (UK); WEA (Germany)
- Songwriters: Will Sergeant; Ian McCulloch; Les Pattinson; Pete de Freitas
- Producers: The Bunnymen; Gil Norton; Henri Loustau

Echo & the Bunnymen singles chronology
"The Sound of Echo" (1984)	"Silver" (1984)	"Seven Seas" (1984)

"Silver" is a single by the English rock band Echo & the Bunnymen which was released on 13 April 1984. It was the second single to be released from their fourth studio album, Ocean Rain (1984). It stayed on the UK singles chart for five weeks, reaching a peak of number 30. It also reached number 14 on the Irish Singles Chart.

The B-side to the 7" is "Angels and Devils". The 12" version of the single was extended by one minute and 50 seconds and called "Silver (Tidal Wave)" and the B-side is the 7" version and "Angels and Devils". The 7" and 12" versions of the title track were recorded at the Studio Des Dames in Paris and the Amazon Studio in Liverpool, while "Angels and Devils" was recorded at The Automat in San Francisco on 18 March 1984.

== Reception ==
In a retrospective review for AllMusic, Dave Thompson praised the "lavish arrangement" for the song "Silver", stating that the band's production had created "a sumptuous atmosphere". Thompson added: "Even if the lyrics are amongst McCulloch's more preposterous, his rhymes are clever and his imagery is as vivid as it is surreal."

== Track listings ==
All tracks written by Will Sergeant, Ian McCulloch, Les Pattinson and Pete de Freitas.

7" release (Korova KOW 34)

1. "Silver" – 3:19
2. "Angels and Devils" – 4:24

12" release (Korova KOW 34T)

1. "Silver (Tidal Wave)" – 5:09
2. "Silver" – 3:19
3. "Angels and Devils" – 4:24

== Chart positions ==
Chart (1984)	Peak position
UK Singles Chart	30
Irish Singles Chart	14

== Personnel ==
=== Musicians ===
- Ian McCulloch – vocals, guitar
- Will Sergeant – lead guitar
- Les Pattinson – bass
- Pete de Freitas – drums
- Adam Peters – piano, cello

=== Production ===
- The Bunnymen – producer, mixed by
- Gil Norton – producer, engineer, mixed by
- Henri Loustau – producer, engineer
- David Frazer – engineer
- Jean-Yves – assistant engineer
- Adam Peters – orchestral arrangement
