= Bedbugs and Ballyhoo =

1987 single by Echo & the Bunnymen

Single by Echo & the Bunnymen

from the album Echo & the Bunnymen
- B-side: "Over You" (WEA); "Run, Run, Run" (Sire)
- Released: 1987
- Genre: Post-punk, alternative rock
- Label: WEA, Sire
- Songwriters: Will Sergeant, Ian McCulloch, Les Pattinson, Pete de Freitas
- Producer: Laurie Latham

Echo & the Bunnymen singles chronology
"Lips Like Sugar" (1987)	"Bedbugs and Ballyhoo" (1987)	"People Are Strange" (1987)

Music video
- "Bedbugs and Ballyhoo on YouTube

"Bedbugs and Ballyhoo" is a single by Echo & the Bunnymen that was released in 1987. It was the third single from their 1987 eponymous album. The single was released as a 7-inch single and a 12-inch single by WEA Records and by Sire Records.

== Overview ==
The song was first released as the B-side of the 12" version of the 1985 "Bring on the Dancing Horses" single. It was re-recorded for the 1987 eponymous album. Ray Manzarek of The Doors plays keyboards on the 1987 version.

The B-side of the WEA 7-inch single is "Over You", and that of the Sire 7-inch single is a live recording of a cover version of Lou Reed's "Run, Run, Run". The WEA 12-inch single has the track "New Direction" added to the B-side; the Sire 12-inch single has a club remix of the title track and the LP version of it on the A-side, and the B-side includes additional live performances of The Rolling Stones' "Paint It Black" and Television's "Friction".

"Bedbugs and Ballyhoo" and "Over You" were produced by Laurie Latham, and "Run, Run, Run", "Paint It Black" and "Friction", which were recorded live at the Karen in Gothenburg for the Swedish National Radio programme Bommen, were produced by Lars Aldman.

"Bedbugs and Ballyhoo" was covered by the American group Voyager One on their 2002 album Monster Zero.

The song was featured on Miami Vice season 4 finale, "Mirror Image".

== Track listings ==
All tracks written by Will Sergeant, Ian McCulloch, Les Pattinson, and Pete de Freitas except where noted.

WEA 7-inch single (248135-7)

1. "Bedbugs and Ballyhoo"
2. "Over You"

WEA 12-inch single (248134-0)

1. "Bedbugs and Ballyhoo"
2. "Over You"
3. "New Direction"

Korova/WEA 12-inch EP (248150-CR)

1. "Bedbugs and Ballyhoo (Club Mix)"
2. "Bedbugs and Ballyhoo (LP Version)"
3. "Run, Run, Run" (Reed)
4. "Paint It Black" (Jagger/Richards)
5. "Friction" (Tom Verlaine)

Sire 7-inch single (7-28113)

1. "Bedbugs and Ballyhoo"
2. "Run, Run, Run" (Lou Reed)

Sire 12-inch single (0-20838)

1. "Bedbugs and Ballyhoo (Club Mix)"
2. "Bedbugs and Ballyhoo (LP Version)"
3. "Run, Run, Run" (Reed)
4. "Paint It Black" (Jagger/Richards)
5. "Friction" (Tom Verlaine)

== Personnel ==
=== Musicians ===
- Ian McCulloch – vocals, guitar
- Will Sergeant – lead guitar
- Les Pattinson – bass
- Pete de Freitas – drums
- Ray Manzarek – keyboards

=== Production ===
- Laurie Latham – producer
- Bruce Lampcovc – mixing
- Ivan Ivan – remixing
