= Damon Reece =

English drummer (born 1967)

- Born: 16 February 1967 (age 59); London, England
- Origin: Liverpool, England
- Genres: Alternative rock, trip hop
- Occupation: Drummer
- Instruments: Drums, electronic percussion

Damon Reece (born 16 February 1967) is an English drummer who has been a member of Spiritualized, Echo & the Bunnymen and Lupine Howl.

== Career ==
Growing up in Croydon and drumming in the indie band Abdul & the Casbah Cruisers, Reece moved to Liverpool at the age of eighteen and played in various local bands there. Following the death of Pete de Freitas, Reece joined the re-formed Echo & the Bunnymen, appearing on the album Reverberation (1990). This incarnation of the band met with little success and disbanded shortly afterwards. Reece later joined Spiritualized, but an internal dispute with Jason Pierce following the release of Ladies and Gentlemen We Are Floating in Space (1997) resulted in Reece leaving to form Lupine Howl. Reece has also worked with Massive Attack and Goldfrapp.

== Personal life ==
He lives in Bristol with his partner Elizabeth Fraser (former lead singer of Cocteau Twins), and their daughter Lily (born in 1998).
