= Nothing Lasts Forever (Echo & the Bunnymen song) =

1997 single

Single by Echo & the Bunnymen

from the album Evergreen
- Released: 20 June 1997
- Genre: Alternative rock, dream pop
- Label: London
- Songwriters: Will Sergeant, Ian McCulloch, Les Pattinson
- Producer: Echo & the Bunnymen

Echo & the Bunnymen singles chronology
"Inside Me, Inside You" (1992)	"Nothing Lasts Forever" (1997)	"I Want to Be There" (1997)

Alternative cover
- Alternate CD cover

"Nothing Lasts Forever" is a single by Echo & the Bunnymen which was released in 1997. It was the first single released after Ian McCulloch, Will Sergeant and Les Pattinson reformed the band. It was also the first single to be released from their 1997 album, Evergreen. It reached number 8 on the UK Singles Chart. The single was released as a 7-inch single and as two separate CD versions – apart from the title track all three releases had different track listings. The French and German versions of the CD releases also had different track listings.

The video was shot in Marrakesh, Morocco.

It was the last song to be played by Janice Long on her final show on Radio 2, on 26 January 2017. It was also the last song played on The Christian O'Connell Breakfast Show on Absolute Radio on 18 May 2018.

== Track listings ==
All tracks written by Will Sergeant, Ian McCulloch and Les Pattinson.

UK 7-inch release (London LON396)

1. "Nothing Lasts Forever"
2. "Hurracaine"
3. "Jonny"

UK CD release (London LONCD396)

1. "Nothing Lasts Forever" – 3:53
2. "Watchtower" – 4:25
3. "Polly" – 4:17

UK alternate CD release (London LOCDP396)

1. "Nothing Lasts Forever" – 3:55
2. "Colour Me In" – 4:00
3. "Antelope" – 2:44

French/German CD release (London 8509612)

1. "Nothing Lasts Forever"
2. "Colour Me In"
3. "Antelope"
4. "Jonny"

French/German alternate CD release (London 8509592)

1. "Nothing Lasts Forever"
2. "Watchtower"
3. "Polly"
4. "Hurracaine"

== Chart positions ==
Chart (1997)	Peak position
UK Singles Chart	8

== Personnel ==
=== Musicians ===
- Ian McCulloch – vocals, guitar
- Will Sergeant – lead guitar
- Les Pattinson – bass
- Liam Gallagher – backing vocals and handclaps ("Nothing Lasts Forever")
- Paul “Bonehead” Arthurs – handclaps

=== Production ===
- Echo & the Bunnymen – producer
- Markus Butler – engineer ("Watchtower", "Polly", "Colour Me In", "Jonny")
- Clif Norrell – mixed by ("Nothing Lasts Forever")
- Norman Watson – photographer
