= Bring On the Dancing Horses =

1985 single by Echo & the Bunnymen

Single by Echo & the Bunnymen

from the album Songs to Learn & Sing
- B-side: "Over Your Shoulder", "Bedbugs and Ballyhoo"
- Released: 7 October 1985
- Genre: Alternative rock; post-punk; neo-psychedelia; dream pop
- Length: 3:59 (7"); 5:37 (12")
- Label: Korova
- Songwriters: Will Sergeant; Ian McCulloch; Les Pattinson; Pete de Freitas
- Producers: Laurie Latham; The Bunnymen

Echo & the Bunnymen singles chronology
| "Seven Seas" (1984) | "Bring On the Dancing Horses" (1985) | "The Game" (1987) |

Music video
- "Bring On the Dancing Horses" on YouTube

"Bring On the Dancing Horses" is a single by the English rock band Echo & the Bunnymen, released on 7 October 1985. It was the only single from their compilation album Songs to Learn & Sing (1985) and was recorded for the John Hughes teen romantic comedy-drama film Pretty in Pink (1986). The song reached number 21 on the UK singles chart and number 15 on the Irish Singles Chart.

== Background ==
The band's lead singer Ian McCulloch said of the song: "When I write, the words tend to come first and the meaning later. It's a romantic single, not in a wishy-washy way, but in a big powerful way."

== Releases ==
The single was released as a 7" single, a 12" single and a shaped picture disc. On the 7" single and the picture disc the title track is three minutes and 59 seconds long and the B-side is "Over Your Shoulder". The title track was extended by one minute and 38 seconds for the 12-inch single, to five minutes and 37 seconds, and an extra track, "Bedbugs and Ballyhoo", was added to the B-side. The 7" single was also released as a limited edition with an extra disc containing "Villiers Terrace" and "Monkeys" from the August 1979 Peel Session. Laurie Latham produced the title track and the Bunnymen produced the B-sides. The singles were released on Korova in the United Kingdom and on WEA elsewhere.

== Critical reception ==
AllMusic journalist Stewart Mason praised the song's "dreamily catchy chorus" and "nice melody", adding that the layers of synths and Ian McCulloch's overdubbed vocals on the chorus add to the "psychedelic haze of the track".

John Leland at Spin said, "the only new song on Echo and the Bunnymen's best-of album, goes for the massive, resonant whoosh of [ the Smiths's] "How Soon Is Now?" and [ U2's] "Pride (In the Name of Love)", but comes up empty. The inane rhymes on the chorus don't help."

== Track listings ==
All tracks written by Will Sergeant, Ian McCulloch, Les Pattinson and Pete de Freitas.

7-inch (Korova KOW 43, WEA S248933-7) and picture disc (Korova KOW 43P, WEA 248933–7)

1. "Bring On the Dancing Horses" – 3:59
2. "Over Your Shoulder" – 4:04

12-inch (Korova KOW 43T, WEA 248932–0)

1. "Bring On the Dancing Horses" – 5:37
2. "Bedbugs and Ballyhoo" – 3:35
3. "Over Your Shoulder" – 4:04

== Personnel ==
Echo & the Bunnymen

- Ian McCulloch – vocals, guitar
- Will Sergeant – lead guitar
- Les Pattinson – bass
- Pete de Freitas – drums

Technical

- Laurie Latham – producer
- The Bunnymen – producer

== Chart positions ==
| Chart (1985–6) | Peak position |
|---|---|
| Australia (Kent Music Report) | 78 |
| Belgium (Ultratop 50) | 19 |
| Irish Singles Chart | 15 |
| Netherlands (Single Top 100) | 45 |
| New Zealand (Recorded Music NZ) | 31 |
| UK singles chart | 21 |
