= Seven Seas (song) =

1984 single by Echo & the Bunnymen

Single by Echo & the Bunnymen

from the album Ocean Rain
- A-side: "Seven Seas" / "All You Need Is Love"
- B-side: "The Killing Moon" / "Stars Are Stars" / "Villiers Terrace"
- Released: 6 July 1984
- Genre: Post-punk; alternative rock; jangle pop
- Length: 3:19
- Label: Korova (UK); WEA (Worldwide)
- Songwriters: Will Sergeant; Ian McCulloch; Les Pattinson; Pete de Freitas
- Producer: The Bunnymen

Echo & the Bunnymen singles chronology
"Silver" (1984)	"Seven Seas" (1984)	"Bring on the Dancing Horses" (1985)

Music video
- ”Seven Seas” on YouTube

Life at Brian's – Lean and Hungry
- 12" ep cover

"Seven Seas" is a single by the English rock band Echo & the Bunnymen, which was released on 6 July 1984 by Korova. It was the third single to be released from their fourth studio album Ocean Rain (1984). It reached number 16 on the UK singles chart and number 10 on the Irish Singles Chart.

In a retrospective review of the song, AllMusic journalist Dave Thompson said: "Regardless of the surreal lyrics, their enigmatic meaning dovetails marvelously with the mood of this exquisite piece."

== Overview ==
The single was released as a 7-inch single and a 12-inch single. The A-side of the 7-inch single was the title track, "Seven Seas", and the B-side was a live cover version of the Beatles' song "All You Need Is Love". The A-side of the 12-inch single consisted of the title track and "All You Need Is Love". The B-side consisted of "The Killing Moon", "Stars Are Stars" and "Villiers Terrace".

"All You Need Is Love", "The Killing Moon", "Stars Are Stars" and "Villiers Terrace" were recorded live at Liverpool Cathedral for the Channel 4 programme Play at Home.

A numbered limited edition 7-inch EP was also available on two discs, with all the tracks of the 12-inch single release and with the added title on the cover of Life at Brian's – Lean and Hungry.

In the US, a 7-inch single was released on Sire Records with the song "Angels and Devils" on the b-side.

American indie rock group Velocity Girl released a cover version of "Seven Seas" as a single on Heaven Records in 1995.

== Track listings ==
All tracks written by Will Sergeant, Ian McCulloch, Les Pattinson and Pete de Freitas unless otherwise noted.

7-inch single (Korova KOW 35, WEA 249 321-7)

1. "Seven Seas" – 3:19
2. "All You Need Is Love" (Lennon–McCartney) – 6:41

12-inch single (Korova KOW 35T, WEA 249 320-0) and 7-inch EP (Korova KOW 35F)

1. "Seven Seas" – 3:19
2. "All You Need Is Love" (Lennon–McCartney) – 6:41
3. "The Killing Moon" – 3:17
4. "Stars Are Stars" – 3:05
5. "Villiers Terrace" – 6:52

US 7-inch single (Sire 7-29288)

1. "Seven Seas" – 3:18
2. "Angels and Devils" – 4:07

== Chart positions ==
Chart (1984)	Peak position
UK Singles Chart	16
Irish Singles Chart	10

== Personnel ==
=== Musicians ===
==== Echo & the Bunnymen ====
- Ian McCulloch – vocals, guitar
- Will Sergeant – lead guitar
- Les Pattinson – bass
- Pete de Freitas – drums

==== Additional ====
- Adam Peters – piano, cello
- Tim Whittaker – bongos
- Khien Luu – clarinet, alto saxophone
- Alam Perman – harpsichord
- James Drake-Brockman – harpsichord

=== Production ===
- The Bunnymen – producer, mixed by
- Gil Norton – engineer, mixed by
- Henri Loustau – engineer
- Jean-Yves – assistant engineer
- Adam Peters – orchestral arrangement
- Anton Corbijn – photography
