= The Killing Moon =

Single by Echo & the Bunnymen

Single by Echo & the Bunnymen

from the album Ocean Rain
- B-side: "Do It Clean"
- Released: 20 January 1984
- Recorded: December 1983
- Studio: Amazon Studios (Liverpool); Crescent Studio (Bath)
- Genre: Post-punk; synth-pop; neo-psychedelia
- Length: 5:47
- Label: Korova
- Songwriters: Will Sergeant; Ian McCulloch; Les Pattinson; Pete de Freitas
- Producer: David Lord

Echo & the Bunnymen singles chronology
"Never Stop" (1983)	"The Killing Moon" (1984)	"The Sound of Echo" (1984)

Music video
- "The Killing Moon" on YouTube

"The Killing Moon" is a song by the English rock band Echo & the Bunnymen. It was released on 20 January 1984 by Korova as the lead single from their fourth studio album, Ocean Rain (1984). It is one of the band's highest-charting hits, reaching number 9 in the UK singles chart, and often cited as the band's greatest song. Ian McCulloch has said: "When I sing 'The Killing Moon', I know there isn't a band in the world who's got a song anywhere near that." In a retrospective review of the song, AllMusic journalist Stewart Mason wrote: "The smart use of strings amplifies the elegance of the tune, bringing both a musical richness and a sense of quiet dignity to the tune."

The song appeared on the soundtrack to the 2001 science fiction film Donnie Darko, and in the movie Gia (1998), starring Angelina Jolie.

== Lyrics ==
According to the liner notes of Echo & the Bunnymen's box set Crystal Days: 1979–1999 (2001), Ian McCulloch woke up one morning with the phrase "fate up against your will" in mind. In a 2015 interview, McCulloch said: "I love (the song) all the more because I didn't pore over it for days on end. One morning, I just sat bolt upright in bed with this line in my head: 'Fate up against your will. Through the thick and thin. He will wait until you give yourself to him.' You don't dream things like that and remember them. That's why I've always half credited the lyric to God. It's never happened before or since." McCulloch attributed the use of astronomical imagery in the song to a childhood interest in space.

== Music ==
The chords of the song were based on David Bowie's "Space Oddity", played backwards. The arrangement of the song was partially inspired by balalaika music that Les Pattinson and Will Sergeant had heard in Russia. The guitar solo had been recorded separately by Sergeant whilst tuning up and was inserted in the song at the suggestion of producer David Lord. The strings on the track are a combination of Adam Peters' cello and keyboards played by the producer. The song is in Aeolian dominant.

== Track listing ==
- UK 12"
1. "The Killing Moon" (All Night Version) – 9:11
2. "The Killing Moon" – 5:50
3. "Do It Clean" (Recorded live at the Royal Albert Hall London 18 July 1983) – 6:36

== Charts ==
=== Weekly charts ===
Weekly chart performance for "The Killing Moon"
Chart (1984)	Peak position
Australia (Kent Music Report)	96
Irish Singles Chart	7
New Zealand (Recorded Music NZ)	12
UK Singles Chart	9

=== Year-end charts ===
1984 year-end chart performance for "The Killing Moon"
Chart (1984)	Peak position
New Zealand (Recorded Music NZ)	46

== Certifications ==
Certifications and sales for "The Killing Moon"
Region	Certification	Certified units/sales
United Kingdom (BPI)	Gold	400,000^{‡}
^{‡} Sales+streaming figures based on certification alone.

== Other media and cover versions ==
"The Killing Moon" was featured in the 2001 film Donnie Darko, setting the tone for the opening scene as Donnie Darko (Jake Gyllenhaal) enters the town. Richard Kelly had originally planned to use "Never Tear Us Apart" by INXS in this scene, but was unable to secure the rights for the theatrical release. For the director's cut of the film in 2004, "Never Tear Us Apart" is featured in the opening scene and "The Killing Moon" is used later in the film. The Digital Fix film review opined that the Bunnymen song worked much better in the opening scene.

The song was featured in the 1997 film Grosse Pointe Blank, the 1998 film Gia about Gia Carangi played by (Angelina Jolie), as well as the 2004 film The Girl Next Door.

Both the original version and a cover version by Nouvelle Vague (band) were featured in the series Yellowjackets (TV series).

Notable covers of the song include those by Pavement on their 1999 EP Major Leagues, Chvrches in 2021, and Thea Gilmore on her favorites album These Quiet Friends (2025).

One of the two endings in Phantom Liberty (2023), the expansion for Cyberpunk 2077, is named after the song because of its own symbolism related to the moon.
