= Noel Burke =

Northern Irish singer

- Born: Noel Andrew Burke; 29 November 1962 (age 63); Belfast, Northern Ireland
- Instruments: vocals, guitar
- Years active: 1987–present

Noel Andrew Burke (born 29 November 1962 in Belfast) is an Irish singer, who is best known for replacing Ian McCulloch as the lead singer with Echo & the Bunnymen from 1989 to 1993.

Burke's first band was St. Vitus Dance, who released the album Love Me, Love My Dogma in 1987. The band split and Burke was contacted by Will Sergeant, who invited him to join Echo & the Bunnymen as lead vocalist. The band released Reverberation (1990) to mostly negative reviews, though the album has subsequently garnered some acclaim. The Bunnymen formally announced their disbandment in 1993, later reforming with McCulloch back on vocals.

In 2005, Burke reformed St. Vitus Dance for some live shows. An album of new material, Glyphotheque, was released in 2008.

== Album discography ==
=== With St. Vitus Dance ===
- Love Me Love My Dogma (1987)
- Glyphotheque (2008)
- Bystanders (2012)

=== With Echo & the Bunnymen ===
- Reverberation (1990)
