= Laurie Latham =

British rock producer

Laurie Latham (born 1954) is a British record producer. Some of his most notable productions include the albums New Boots & Panties by Ian Dury & the Blockheads (1977), No Parlez by Paul Young (1983), Cosi Fan Tutti Frutti by Squeeze (1985), Echo & the Bunnymen by Echo & the Bunnymen (1987), amongst more relatively recent productions for Stereophonics and the Maccabees.

== Career ==
Latham began his career in 1973 at Maximum Sound Studios, learning sound engineering whilst attending Surrey University, where he was inspired by guest lecturers such as George Martin. Following a period of engineering late night reggae sessions for artists such as Alton Ellis, Latham was advanced to chief engineer and recorded sessions with Vivien Stanshall, Jimmy Webb and the opportunity to record music for the Monty Python and the Holy Grail soundtrack with George Harrison and the Monty Python team.

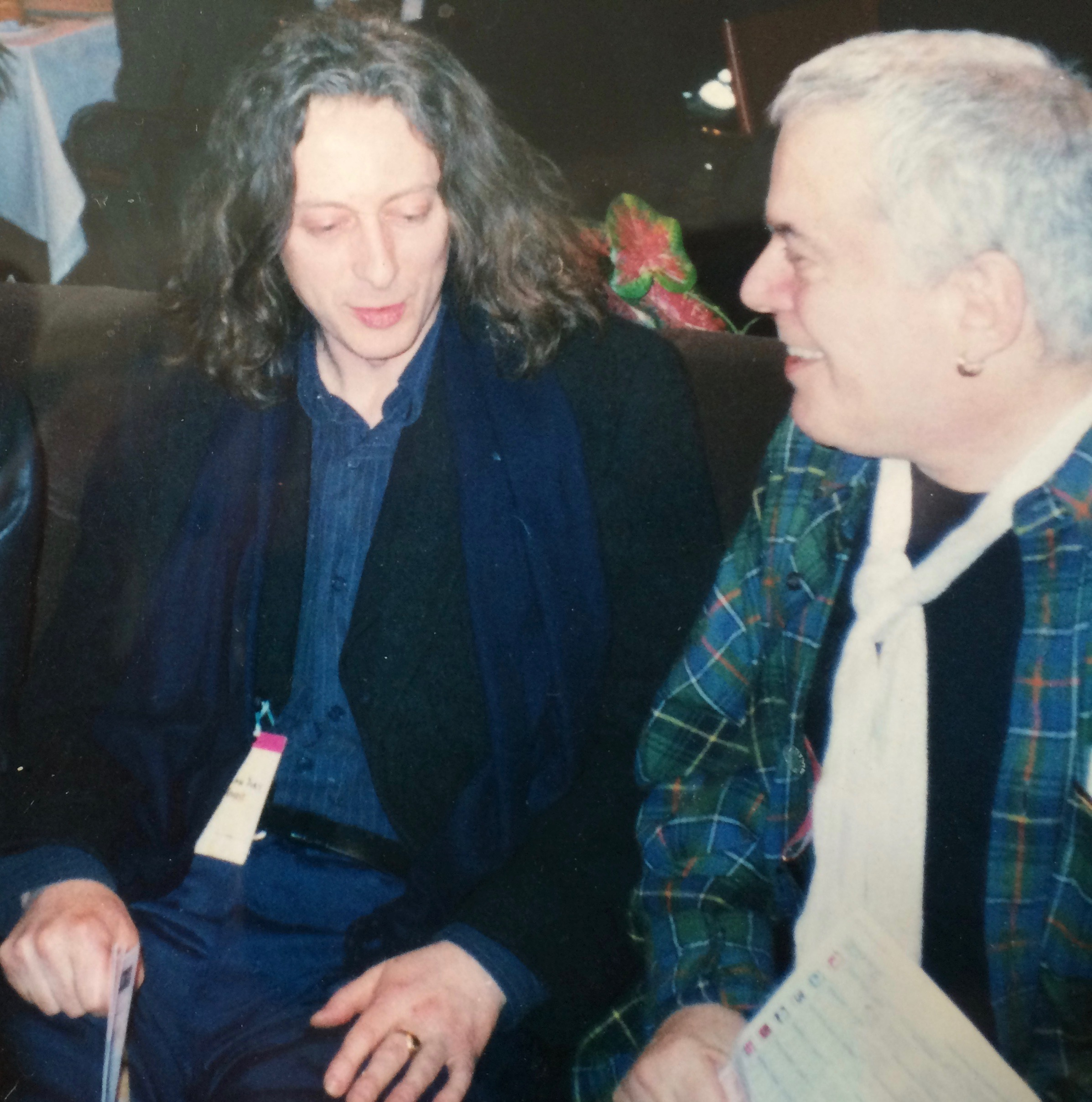
Laurie Latham reunited with Ian Dury in 1998

By the mid-1970s, Latham had forged a prolific working relationship with Manfred Mann, which included engineering the hit cover version of Bruce Springsteen's "Blinded by the Light" by Manfred Mann's Earth Band – reaching the number one spot in the US in February 1977. He was the producer and engineer for Ian Dury's New Boots and Panties!! and produced the singles "What a Waste" and "Hit Me with Your Rhythm Stick", which went to number one in the UK in 1979.
