= Lips Like Sugar =

1987 single by Echo & the Bunnymen

Single by Echo & the Bunnymen

from the album Echo & the Bunnymen
- B-side: "Rollercoaster"
- Released: 20 July 1987
- Genre: Post-punk; new wave
- Length: 4:52 (album version); 3:59 (single edit)
- Label: WEA; Sire
- Songwriters: Will Sergeant; Ian McCulloch; Les Pattinson
- Producers: Laurie Latham; The Bunnymen; Gil Norton

Echo & the Bunnymen singles chronology
| "The Game" (1987) | "Lips Like Sugar" (1987) | "Bedbugs and Ballyhoo" (1988) |

Music video
- "Lips Like Sugar" on YouTube

"Lips Like Sugar" is a single by the English rock band Echo & the Bunnymen, which was released in July 1987. It was the second single from their eponymous fifth studio album (1987).

Initially dismissed by Ian McCulloch as too commercial, "Lips Like Sugar" became a chart success in the UK, Ireland, and New Zealand. Despite not charting in the US, the song has become one of their most famous songs in America, thanks in part to college radio airplay and its music video directed by Anton Corbijn, which was regularly broadcast on MTV's 120 Minutes programme.

The song has since been covered by multiple artists and has been positively received by critics.

== Background ==
Ian McCulloch wrote the lyrics to "Lips Like Sugar" and "Rollercoaster", while the music is credited to McCulloch, Will Sergeant and Les Pattinson. "Lips Like Sugar" was produced by Laurie Latham.

McCulloch was initially dismissive of the song, saying in 1992, "It was an OK song, I suppose, but it didn't sound like us ... We just got sucked into a new mentality on that last album, the sound of Radio America." He softened his attitude toward the song in a 2005 interview, saying "It may have a few synthetic twinkles on it, but the song itself was strong enough to shine through."

== Release ==
"Lips Like Sugar" was released as the second single from Echo & the Bunnymen, backed with "Rollercoaster". The song was a chart success, reaching number 36 in the UK, number 24 in Ireland, and number 43 in New Zealand. The song did not chart in the US, despite "how much attention it seemed to garner at the time of its initial release and how it’s so often held up as the band's signature song in the States". The song largely saw success on college radio.

Will Sergeant credited the song as a turning point in the band's success, saying "It just started started building. It was building naturally, and then we ended up doing the Greek Theater in Hollywood and the sheds and places like that. All of the sudden the crowd started changing - they'd become, like really young kids. You're thinking, Why? It was just weird. I'd be walking around with Les [Pattinson, bass] and Pete [de Freitas, drums] in the crowd and no one knew who we were. It all changed. It was just odd. Right around 'Lips Like Sugar,' it really changed."

A British 12-inch single of the song was released, with "Lips Like Sugar" and "Rollercoaster" on the A-side, and a cover version of the Doors' "People Are Strange" on the B-side, which was recorded for the soundtrack of the film The Lost Boys and was released as a single in its own right the following year. The US 12-inch single had the same A-side as the British 12-inch single, with two other mixes of the title track on the B-side.

A music video for the song, directed by Anton Corbijn, features the band performing the song and ends with the band "transport[ing] from the sound studio to a garish set straight out of Star Trek, where the Bunnymen are hunted by a couple of women in lurid space suits". The video is filmed in a "minimalist, grainy black-and-white" style typical of Corbijn's work.

=== Packaging ===
The 7-inch single came in a gate-fold sleeve with a picture of McCulloch on the front cover, Sergeant on the back cover and Pattinson and de Freitas on the two inside covers. The 7-inch single was also available in a limited edition boxed packaging containing the single and three postcards. The 12-inch single and the boxed 7-inch single had the same picture on the front covers as the standard edition 7-inch single.

=== Critical reception ===
Pitchfork described the track as a "hook-heavy reverb bomb". David Cleary of AllMusic noted that "Pete de Freitas' solid drumming at times veered toward the danceable" on the track.

== Cover versions ==
A photo gallery accompanied by audio of Coldplay performing "Lips Like Sugar" live in Paris is included on their 2002 DVD single "The Scientist". This audio track was also included on the Australian release of their 2003 single "God Put a Smile upon Your Face". McCulloch notably performed the song live with Coldplay in 2003 at the Scottish T in the Park festival.

Seal recorded a version of the song featuring the reggae singer Mikey Dread for the soundtrack of the 2004 film 50 First Dates. A version of the song, performed by Solina, is included on the 2005 Spanish tribute album Play the Game: Un Tributo a Echo & the Bunnymen. The Smashing Pumpkins covered "Lips Like Sugar" on their 2008 Europe and Australian tour. A performance of the song was recorded on Australia's MTV.

David Hasselhoff recorded a version of the song featuring A Flock of Seagulls on his 2019 album Open Your Eyes.

October Noir recorded a version of the song and was released as a non-album single in 2018.

== Track listings ==
All tracks written by Will Sergeant, Ian McCulloch and Les Pattinson, except where noted.

7-inch release (WEA YZ144)

1. "Lips Like Sugar"
2. "Rollercoaster" (Sergeant, McCulloch, Pattinson, Pete de Freitas)

UK 12-inch release (WEA YZ144T)

1. "Lips Like Sugar"
2. "Rollercoaster" (Sergeant, McCulloch, Pattinson, de Freitas)
3. "People Are Strange" (Robby Krieger, Jim Morrison)

US 12-inch release (Sire 0-20784)

1. "Lips Like Sugar (12" mix)"
2. "Rollercoaster" (Sergeant, McCulloch, Pattinson, de Freitas)
3. "Lips Like Sugar (dub)"
4. "Lips Like Sugar (single mix)"

== Chart positions ==
| Chart (1987) | Peak position |
|---|---|
| UK Singles Chart | 36 |
| Irish Singles Chart | 24 |

== Personnel ==
=== Musicians ===
- Ian McCulloch – vocals; guitar
- Will Sergeant – lead guitar
- Les Pattinson – bass
- Pete de Freitas – drums
- Henry Priestman – piano

=== Production ===
- Laurie Latham – producer ("Lips Like Sugar")
- The Bunnymen – producer ("Rollercoaster")
- Gil Norton – producer ("Rollercoaster"); engineer ("Rollercoaster")
- Ray Manzarek – producer ("People Are Strange")
- Bruce Lampcov – mixing ("Lips Like Sugar"); remix ("Lips Like Sugar (12" mix)")
- François Kevorkian – remix ("Lips Like Sugar (dub)" and "Lips Like Sugar (single mix)")
- Michael R. Hutchinson – remix ("Lips Like Sugar (dub)" and "Lips Like Sugar (single mix)")
