= Straight from the Desk =

Live album by Ian Dury and the Blockheads
- Released: 2001
- Recorded: 23 December 1978
- Venues: Ilford Odeon, Ilford, East London
- Genre: Rock
- Length: 1:13:21

Ian Dury and the Blockheads chronology
Mr. Love Pants (1997)	Straight from the Desk (2001)	Ten More Turnips from the Tip (2002)

Straight from the Desk is a live album by Ian Dury and the Blockheads recorded on 23 December 1978 at the Ilford Odeon, Ilford, East London.

There is little information available about the album, other than what can be heard on the record. During the performance of "Billericay Dickie" the audience break the venue's floor, presumably in excitement causing Dury to warn the audience to mind the hole as an introduction to "Hit Me with Your Rhythm Stick" and mention it repeatedly later in the set. Dury forgets the words totally on "There Ain't Half Been Some Clever Bastards" forcing the Blockheads to carry on playing while he remembers them and gets back in time.

Also featured at the concert was a 'Blockheads light' that was presumably a piece of on-stage equipment that falls over and fails to work at the same time Ian Dury breaks his microphone. This can be heard at the start of "My Old Man".

Although the set features "Sex & Drugs & Rock & Roll", lasting over 12 minutes, the song is played mostly as a long instrumental featuring band introductions and their respective solos with only the song's first verse and an end repetition of the title. "Clevor Trever" features a lengthy instrumental break, including a saxophone solo by Davey Payne and also an ad-lib name checking West Ham United F.C. and Gants Hill, Ilford, Romford, Barking and Dagenham, Dagenham is also name-checked in the performance "Hit Me with Your Rhythm Stick". These are all areas near the venue.

The album was the first time a recording of "I Made Mary Cry" was released. A song written during Dury's time with Ian Dury & the Kilburns, the latter-day incarnation of his influential pub rock band Kilburn and the High Roads with Rod Melvin (who also co-wrote his first hit single "What a Waste") and a song that Ian Dury continued with the Blockheads as late as 1979. This version, like other live versions with the Blockheads, features a much happier ending than the studio version with the song's protagonist, a criminal, being released rather than dying on the floor of his cell. Also included is a version of Kilburn & The Highroads song "Upminster Kid", like "You're More Than Fair" Dury sings it in his own regional dialect rather than the accent used on the studio recordings.

== Track listing ==
All tracks composed by Ian Dury and Chaz Jankel, except where indicated.

1. "Wake Up and Make Love With Me" – 4:33
2. "I'm Partial To Your Abracadabra" – 3:00
3. "Upminster Kid" (Dury, Russell Hardy) – 4:08
4. "Clevor Trever" – 7:41
5. "This Is What We Find" (Dury, Mickey Gallagher) – 4:52
6. "You're More Than Fair" (Dury, Hardy) – 2:46
7. "Blackmail Man" (Dury, Steve Nugent) – 2:42
8. "Billericay Dickie" (Dury, Nugent) – 3:16
9. "Hit Me with Your Rhythm Stick" – 4:55
10. "There Ain't Half Been Some Clever Bastards" (Dury, Hardy) – 3:48
11. "Plaistow Patricia" (Dury, Nugent) – 6:10
12. "I Made Mary Cry" (Dury, Rod Melvin) – 4:03
13. "What a Waste" (Dury, Melvin) – 3:34
14. "My Old Man" (Dury, Nugent) – 5:08
15. "Sex & Drugs & Rock & Roll" – 12:27

== Personnel ==
Ian Dury and the Blockheads

- Ian X – vocals
- Chaz Jankel – guitar, keyboards
- Norman Watt-Roy – bass
- John Turnbull – guitar
- Davey Payne – saxophones
- Charley Charles – drums
- Mickey Gallagher – keyboards

== Sources ==
- Sex And Drugs And Rock And Roll: The Life of Ian Dury by Richard Balls, first published 2000, Omnibus Press
- Ian Dury & The Blockheads: Song By Song by Jim Drury, first published 2003, Sanctuary Publishing.
