= Mick Gallagher =

English keyboardist (born 1945)

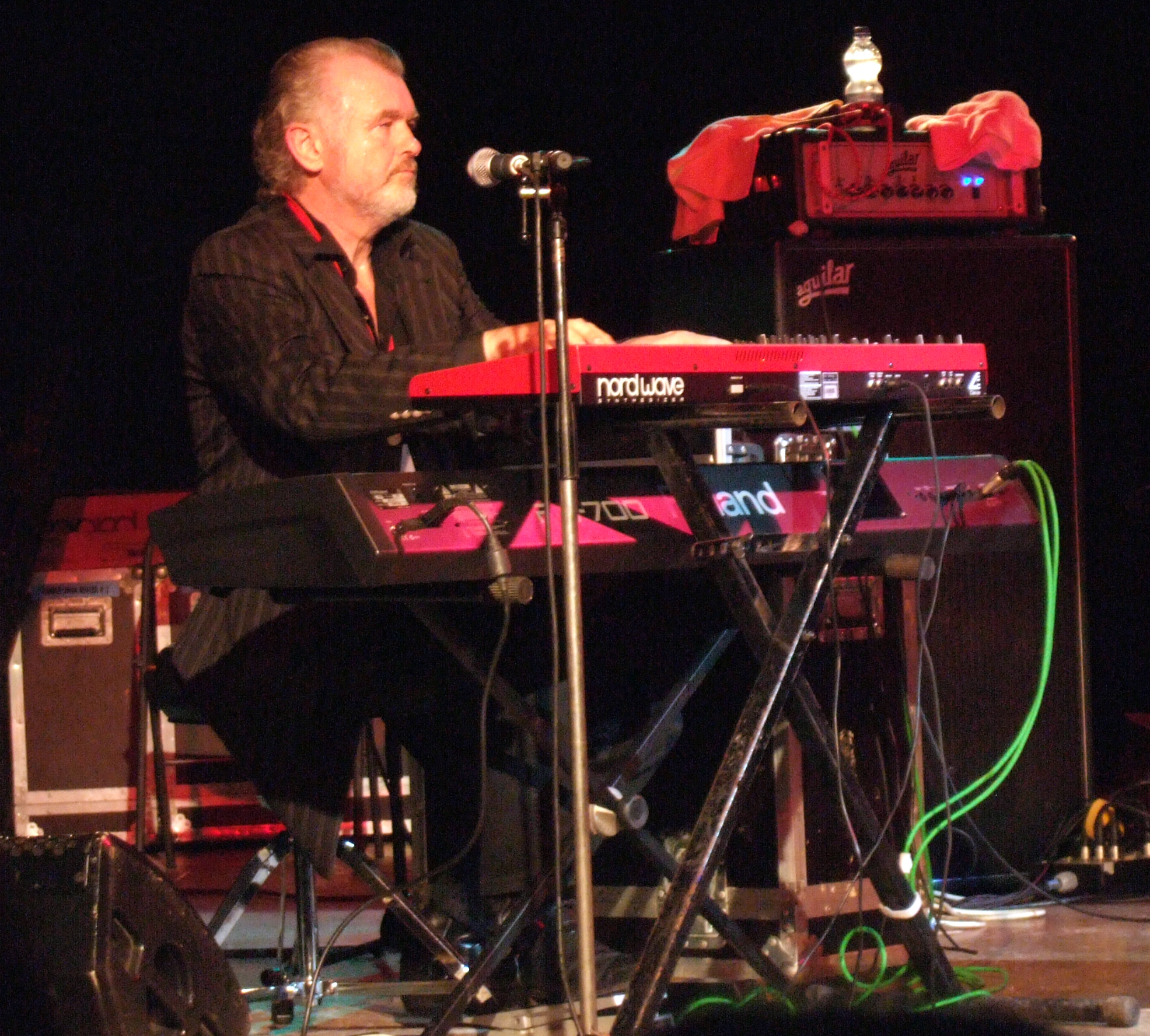
- Gallagher on tour with Animals & Friends in France, 2008

Background information
- Also known as: Mickey Gallagher
- Born: Michael William Gallagher; 29 October 1945 (age 80); Fenham, Newcastle upon Tyne, England
- Origin: London, England
- Genres: Rock; punk rock; reggae; rock and roll
- Occupations: Musician; composer
- Instrument: Keyboards
- Years active: 1965–present
- Member of: The Blockheads
- Formerly of: The Animals; Skip Bifferty; Cochise; Arc; The Animals and Friends; Loving Awareness; The Chosen Few

Michael William Gallagher (born 29 October 1945) is an English Hammond organ, piano and synthesiser player best known as a member of Ian Dury and the Blockheads and for his contributions to albums by the Clash. He has also written music for films such as Extremes (1971) and After Midnight (1990), and the Broadway play Serious Money (1987).

== Early band work ==
Mick Gallagher started his musical career in Newcastle with The Unknowns in the early 1960s. He played with the Animals during 1965, replacing their founding member Alan Price. He moved on to form The Chosen Few, where he played alongside Alan Hull, who later formed Lindisfarne. Other associations include Skip Bifferty, Peter Frampton's Camel and Cochise.

In 1977 Gallagher was playing in a band called Loving Awareness, including John Turnbull, Charley Charles and Norman Watt-Roy. Charles and Watt-Roy worked as session musicians with Ian Dury, and when the group went on tour, Gallagher and Turnbull were invited along. This band became the Blockheads.

== Ian Dury and the Blockheads ==
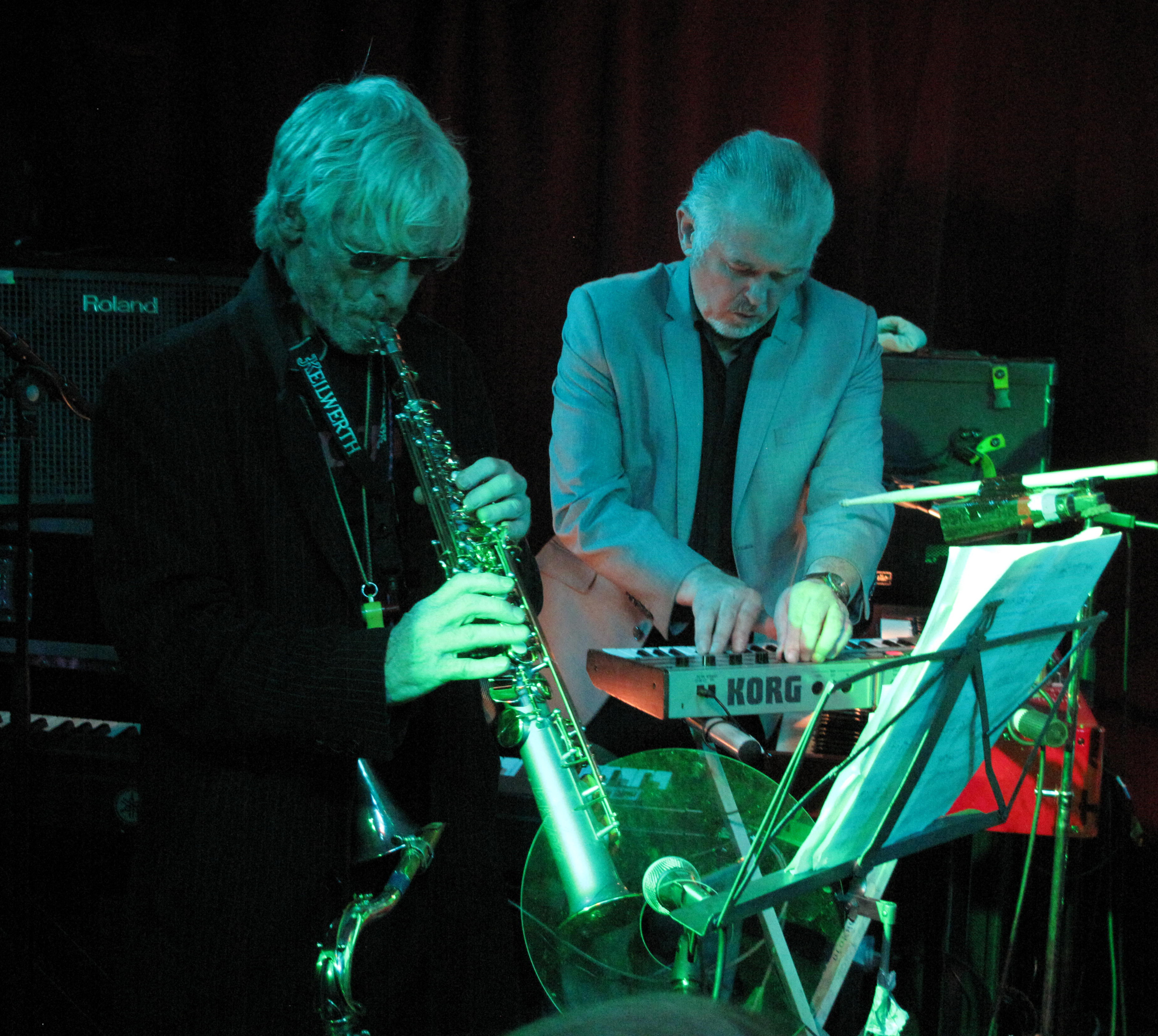
Gallagher (right) and Davey Payne with the Blockheads in 2011

Under the management of Andrew King and Peter Jenner, the original managers of Pink Floyd, Ian Dury and the Blockheads quickly gained a reputation as one of the top live acts of new wave music. The Blockheads' sound drew from its members' diverse musical influences, which included jazz, rock and roll, funk, reggae and Dury's love of music hall. Gallagher's Hammond sound was a major contribution to the band.

The single "Sex & Drugs & Rock & Roll", released 26 August 1977, marked Blockheads' Stiff debut. Although it was banned by the BBC, it was named Single of the Week by NME on its release. The single issue was soon followed at the end of September by the album New Boots and Panties!!, which, although it did not include the single, achieved platinum status.

In October 1977 Gallagher and the band started performing as Ian Dury & the Blockheads, when the band signed on for the Stiff "Live Stiffs Tour" alongside Elvis Costello & the Attractions, Nick Lowe, Wreckless Eric and Larry Wallis. The tour was a success, and Stiff launched a concerted Ian Dury marketing campaign, resulting in the Top Ten hit "What a Waste", and the hit single "Hit Me with Your Rhythm Stick", which reached No. 1 in the UK at the beginning of 1979, selling just short of a million copies. Again, "Hit Me" was not included on the original release of the subsequent album Do It Yourself. Both the single and its accompanying music video featured Davey Payne playing two saxophones simultaneously during his solo, in evident homage to jazz saxophonist Rahsaan Roland Kirk, whose "trademark" technique this was. With their hit singles, the band built up a dedicated following in the UK and other countries, and their next single "Reasons to be Cheerful, Part 3" made number three in the UK.

The band's second album, Do It Yourself, was released in June 1979 in a Barney Bubbles-designed sleeve of which there were over a dozen variations, all based on samples from the Crown wallpaper catalogue. Bubbles also designed the Blockhead logo.

Chas Jankel left the band temporarily and relocated to the U.S. after the release of "What a Waste" (his organ part on that single was overdubbed later) but he subsequently returned to the UK and began touring sporadically with the Blockheads, eventually returning to the group full-time for the recording of "Hit Me with Your Rhythm Stick"; according to Gallagher, the band recorded 28 takes of the song, but eventually settled on the second take for the single release. Partly due to personality clashes with Dury, Jankel left the group again in 1980 after the recording of the Do It Yourself LP, and he returned to the US to concentrate on his solo career.

The group worked solidly over the eighteen months between the release of "Rhythm Stick" and their next single, "Reasons to Be Cheerful", which returned them to the charts, making the UK Top 10. Jankel was replaced by former Dr. Feelgood guitarist Wilko Johnson, who also contributed to the next album Laughter (1980) and its two hit singles, although Gallagher recalls that the recording of the Laughter album was difficult and that Dury was drinking heavily in this period.

The Blockheads briefly reformed in June 1987 to play a short tour of Japan, and then disbanded again. In September 1990, following the death from cancer of drummer Charley Charles, they reunited for two benefit concerts in aid of Charles' family, held at The Forum, Camden Town, with Steven Monti on drums. In December 1990, augmented by Merlin Rhys-Jones on guitar and Will Parnell on percussion, they recorded the live album Warts & Audience at the Brixton Academy.

The Blockheads (minus Jankel, who returned to California) toured Spain in January 1991, then disbanded again until August 1994 when, following Jankel's return to England, they were invited to reform for the Madstock! Festival in Finsbury Park; this was followed by sporadic gigs in Europe, Ireland, the UK and Japan through late 1994 and 1995.

In March 1996 Dury was diagnosed with cancer and, after recovering from an operation, he set about writing another album. In early 1998 he reunited with the Blockheads to record the album Mr Love-Pants. In May, Ian Dury & the Blockheads hit the road again, with Dylan Howe replacing Steven Monti on drums. Davey Payne left the group permanently in August and was replaced by Gilad Atzmon; this line-up gigged throughout 1999, culminating in their last performance with Dury on 6 February 2000 at the London Palladium. Dury died six weeks later on 27 March 2000.

Gallagher continued with the Blockheads after Dury's death, contributing to the tribute album Brand New Boots And Panties, then Where's The Party. The Blockheads still tour, and in 2009 released Staring Down the Barrel. They currently comprise Watt-Roy, Jankel, Gallagher, Turnbull, John Roberts on drums, Gilad Atzmon and Dave Lewis on saxes. Derek "The Draw" Hussey (who was Dury's friend and minder) is now writing songs with Jankel as well as singing. They are aided and abetted by Lee Harris, who is their "aide de camp".

== Other work ==
Gallagher played on two of the most influential Clash albums, London Calling (1979) and Sandinista! (1980), and made live appearances with the band, also playing on their last album Cut the Crap (1985), for which he never received a credit.

Gallagher worked with the Clash's drummer Topper Headon again in a short-lived band called Samurai, and again when they recorded Headon's Waking Up (1986), appearing with Bobby Tench and Jimmy Helms. Samurai guitarist Henry Padovani briefly described Gallagher in his memoir: "He had a family, was the serious one of the group, never snorted any coke and managed to somehow control Topper [Headon] a little. Playing with this talented musician was a pleasure." Gallagher has also performed and recorded with Paul McCartney, Roger Daltrey, Robbie Williams, Dave Stewart and Annie Lennox. More recently he returned to perform with The Blockheads and John Steel's The Animals and Friends.

Gallagher has also written music for films such as Extremes (1971) and After Midnight (1990), and the Broadway play Serious Money (1987).

== Personal life ==
Gallagher has three children, Luke, Ben and Maria. In 1980, the three children sang on the Clash's fourth studio album, Sandinista!. Luke and Ben sang on "Career Opportunities" while Maria sang on "The Guns of Brixton" which was featured at the end of the song "Broadway".
