= What a Waste =

Single by Ian Dury and the Blockheads
- B-side: "Wake Up and Make Love with Me"
- Released: April 1978 (U.K.)
- Recorded: 1977
- Studio: The Workhouse Studio, London
- Genre: Funk punk; new wave
- Length: 3:25
- Label: Stiff
- Songwriters: Ian Dury; Rod Melvin
- Producer: Laurie Latham

Ian Dury singles chronology
"Sweet Gene Vincent" (1977)	"What a Waste" (1978)	"Hit Me with Your Rhythm Stick" (1978)

Official video
- "What a Waste" on YouTube

"What a Waste" is a song and single by Ian Dury and the Blockheads, originally released in 1978 on the Stiff Records single BUY 27 "What a Waste" / "Wake Up and Make Love with Me". The song has remained in The Blockheads' set following Dury's death.

Essentially a song about being in a job that makes you happy, Dury claimed in a 1984 interview with Penthouse, that while not condemning 9-to-5 jobs, he had written the song to make people question their lives, echoing the sentiments of his earlier single "Sex & Drugs & Rock & Roll". The song's verses list a number of jobs the song's narrator could have done, from a driver, poet, teacher or soldier to an inmate in a long-term institution and the ticket man at Fulham Broadway station before the chorus reveals that instead he chose to "play the fool in a six-piece band" highlighting some of the pitfalls of this, specifically loneliness, before deciding that "rock and roll don't mind".

The song was written following the break-up of Kilburn and the High Roads in a lull between the formation of Ian Dury & the Kilburns and was written with Rod Melvin in mid-1975, two years before it was released. Originally a third writing credit was given to Chaz Jankel (Dury's long-term songwriting companion): this third writing credit has gradually been phased out and the 2004 Edsel Records re-issue of Do It Yourself credits the song to Dury/Melvin solely. However, in Ian Dury & The Blockheads: Song By Song, Blockheads guitarist John Turnbull claims that the middle instrumental section was brought over from one of the songs four of the Blockheads had written while they were in their previous band, Loving Awareness.

Dury's first hit, "What a Waste / Wake Up and Make Love with Me" was released in April 1978 just before the start of a headlining tour, entering the Top 75 on 29 April and spent 12 weeks there. It peaked at number 9 in the UK singles chart, becoming Stiff Records' biggest selling single to date. A very limited 12" pressing was also released.

The single may have contributed to the confusion over exactly which Ian Dury songs are by him alone and which are by Ian Dury and The Blockheads. The B-side, "Wake Up and Make Love with Me" is not a new version of the song re-recorded by the band, but the original version from Dury's debut solo album New Boots and Panties!! (although some of the band do play on it). "What a Waste", however, is a Blockheads track.

== Reception ==
The song was ranked at No. 3 among the top "Tracks of the Year" for 1978 by NME.

== Re-releases and versions ==
=== Re-releases ===
The song was omitted from Do It Yourself in keeping with Dury's then policy of not including singles on albums: the song was not available again until the compilation album Jukebox Dury. The song can be found in abundance today, not only on Dury compilations but on various punk, new wave and rock albums.

"What a Waste" is included as the final track on the Demon Records re-issue of New Boots and Panties!!, and as the first track on the Edsel Records re-issue of Do It Yourself.

=== Versions ===
Live versions can be found on both Warts 'n' Audience and Straight from the Desk. Dury re-recorded the song with Curve in 1993 for the Peace Together album. The recording was also included on Curve's 2004 compilation album The Way of Curve.

Although the original single omits the exclamation mark, "What a Waste" is sometimes written with one, including on Live! Warts 'n' Audience.

Part of the bridge section of "What a Waste" was sampled by A Tribe Called Quest on their 1991 single "Can I Kick It?".

On their 1998 eponymous album, English indie rock band, theaudience quote the song in the chorus of the track "Running Out Of Space": 'It's high time for summer and for honesty / when you're drunk you will sing What A Waste', followed by a short phrase on keyboards based on the chorus guitar riff.

== Personnel ==
- Ian Dury – vocals

The Blockheads

- Chaz Jankel – keyboards, guitars, musical direction
- John Turnbull – guitars
- Mick Gallagher – keyboards
- Davey Payne – saxophones
- Norman Watt-Roy – bass
- Charley Charles – drums
