= New Boots and Panties!! =

Studio album by Ian Dury
- Released: 30 September 1977
- Recorded: 1977
- Studios: Workhouse Studio, Old Kent Road, London
- Genres: Punk rock; pub rock; disco; music hall
- Length: 37:20
- Label: Stiff
- Producers: Peter Jenner; Laurie Latham; Rick Walton

Ian Dury chronology
Handsome (1975)	New Boots and Panties!! (1977)	Do It Yourself (1979)

Singles from New Boots and Panties!!
- 1. "Sweet Gene Vincent" Released: 25 November 1977; 2. "Wake Up and Make Love with Me" Released: 1978

New Boots and Panties!! is the debut studio album by Ian Dury, released in the UK on Stiff Records on 30 September 1977. The record covers a diverse range of musical styles which reflect Dury's influences and background in pub rock, taking in funk, disco, British music hall and early rock and roll, courtesy of Dury's musical hero Gene Vincent. Consisting mostly of love songs and character stories based on the working-class people of the East End and Essex Estuary areas where he grew up, the songs are frequently ribald and profane, but also contain humour and affection for his characters.

Widely considered to be the best album of Dury's career, it is also his biggest selling, having been certified platinum status in the UK for 300,000 sales. Sales of the album during the first few months after its release were modest, and the album's only single, "Sweet Gene Vincent", failed to chart. Subsequently, three stand-alone singles, "What a Waste", "Hit Me with Your Rhythm Stick" and "Reasons to Be Cheerful, Part 3", all reached the top ten of the UK Singles Chart, and their success kept the album in the spotlight and ensured consistent sales over the next two years.

New Boots and Panties!! was among the UK's top 30 best selling albums of both 1978 and 1979, and eventually peaked at number five in the UK Albums Chart in February 1979, 17 months after its release, after "Hit Me with Your Rhythm Stick"'s chart-topping success.

The album's title derives from Dury's habit of buying clothes second hand and refers to the only items of clothing he insisted on buying new. According to Ian Dury & the Blockheads: Song By Song, the name was chosen by Dury from a list of twenty potential titles drawn up by compere Kosmo Vinyl.

New Boots and Panties!! has been reissued several times, including a three-disc edition for its 30th anniversary and a five-disc box set for its 40th anniversary.

== Background ==
Much of the album was written by Dury, nearly a year before its release, at Oval Mansions (the top floor flat at 40, Oval Mansions, Kennington, London, which he shared with Denise Roudette, and which he nicknamed 'Catshit Mansions') and was written in partnership with Chas Jankel. Some of the tracks were co-written with Steve Nugent.

Dury and Jankel recorded demo tapes of many of the songs in April 1977, joined in the session by Nugent, at Alvic Studios, Wimbledon (run by two musicians, Al James and Vic Sweeney). Jankel played the bass, guitar and piano; Dury sang and played drums. These recordings have since been included as part of Edsel's re-issue of the album. The studio engineer at Alvic told Dury about a rhythm section who were acting as session musicians to earn extra money; bassist Norman Watt-Roy and drummer Hugh "Charley" Charles. As well as playing on New Boots and Panties!! the two became key members of The Blockheads.

According to Wreckless Eric (aka Eric Goulden), the song "Sweet Gene Vincent" was composed on 1 December 1976, the same day as the Sex Pistols' appearance on the Today show hosted by Bill Grundy.

== Recording ==
A week after the demos were finished the final album was recorded in the Workhouse Studio on the Old Kent Road. Dury's management company Blackhill – who would also manage the Clash – owned a 50 per cent share in the studio (along with the group Manfred Mann), and put up the £4,000 to pay for the group to record the album in 'dead time' (that is, when the studio was empty – usually late at night).

The album was produced by Peter Jenner, Laurie Latham, and Rick Walton. Jenner was one of the two partners in Blackhill Management, and had been producing since the late 1960s, having worked with Kevin Ayers and David Bedford among others. Although Jenner was the experienced producer at The Workhouse, in practice he left most of the production for New Boots and Panties!! to his young protégée Latham, who had joined the studio four years previously and who also engineered the album, with Walton carrying out production duties on those occasions when Latham was unavailable. Latham later recalled that Jenner's technical input on the album had been minimal and that he had more of an overseeing role:

"Peter would sit there rolling joints all day and I'd do all the bloody work, but in fairness I also have to say that he taught me an awful lot. He wasn't particularly hands-on, but he would always say things like, 'Laurie, are you sure the bass drum's loud enough? Maybe you should nudge it a bit.' It was always the bass drum or the bass, and if you think about it, the rhythm section is what really defines that record ... I think [Peter] was really undervalued in the end. He recognised that the bass drum and bass were potent, very integral ingredients of the overall sound – the idiosyncratic, mad Cockney-type thing on top of this quite slick, funky sort of rhythm section. And he was also very good at making sure that Ian was on the ball in terms of his vocals."

"Blockheads"
They've got womanly breasts under pale mauve vests
Shoes like dead pigs' noses
Cornflake packet jacket, catalogue trousers
A mouth what never closes

You must have seen Blockheads in raucous teams
Dressed up after work
Who screw their poor old Eileens
Get sloshed, and go berserk

Rotary accessory watches
Hire-purchase signet rings
A beauty to the bully boys
No lonely vestige clings

— "Blockheads" (1977)

Davey Payne and Ed Speight of Dury's old band Kilburn and the High Roads were invited to fill out the sound of the album. Payne, who played saxophone, would stay with Dury for much of the rest of his career. Geoff Castle, who played Moog synthesizer on "Wake Up and Make Love with Me" and "Blockheads", was a friend of Speight's who was asked in to help out. During these sessions a chance remark by Charley Charles would later give the name of the Blockheads to the band; while reading the words to the song "Blockheads", the name stuck after the Stiff tour; exactly how is the source of some disagreement.

== Release and promotion ==
Attempts to find a record label to publish the completed album were initially unsuccessful. Dury's lack of commercial appeal and his unorthodox look worked against him even in the year of the punk rock explosion. It was eventually licensed to Stiff Records, who leased office space directly below the offices of Blackhill Management. Stiff already had Elvis Costello and the Damned on their books, and would go on to score hits not only with Dury, but with Madness, the Pogues, Kirsty MacColl and others. Licensing the album meant there would be no question of who owned it, or its masters.

New Boots and Panties!! was released on 30 September 1977, following the release of the single "Sex & Drugs & Rock & Roll". The single was not a commercial success, nor was it included on the album's original pressing (Dury expressed a strong desire for singles not to be included on the album, and therefore the song and its B-side "Razzle in My Pocket" were omitted) although a later pressing included the track, uncredited, at the start of the second side of the album. At that time it was quite normal to issue 'stand alone singles' and public reaction to the album was unaffected. The album did not reach the top of the UK Albums Chart but it did go platinum on 4 June 1979. Its follow-up, Do It Yourself, reached number two.

== Artwork ==
The photograph for the album's cover was taken by Chris Gabrin outside Axfords underwear and lingerie shop at 306 Vauxhall Bridge Road, Westminster, close to Victoria Station. Gabrin's Mini van and the Woolworths store on the opposite side of the road can be seen reflected in the shop window, although Gabrin was careful to position himself so that Dury would hide his own reflection. The child next to Dury on the cover photograph is his son Baxter Dury. Ian Dury said Baxter ran into shot just as the photograph was taken, but in adulthood Baxter said the photograph appears too posed to be impromptu. Gabrin said, "I only shot 24 exposures and Baxter was in just four of them. As soon as the films were developed Ian came round and we immediately chose the same shot. We were so excited by the picture that we went straight into my darkroom and made the first print. The album title New Boots and Panties was subsequently coined by Ian."

Dury and Stiff's in-house designer Barney Bubbles cropped the photo and added the hand-drawn lettering on the front and back covers, which was written by Stiff's receptionist Cynthia Lole using a magic marker. The phrase 'There's nothing wrong with it!!' appears on the back cover below the track listing: this was apparently the reaction of the Blockheads upon hearing the first playback of the finished record.

Dury later discovered that, unknown to him at the time, his father Bill had died in 1968 in a bedsit just around the corner from where the photograph was taken. Axfords closed its London store in 1990 to concentrate on running the family business from its Brighton factory.

Hi-Fi+ magazine wrote in 2007 that, had the Parental Advisory sticker existed in 1977, it would have been used for New Boots and Panties!!, particularly for the opening line of "Plaistow Patricia". The 2015 re-release of the album from Edsel Record uses the sticker for those offended by the use of "cunt".

== Critical reception ==
Professional ratings
Review scores
Source	Rating
AllMusic	4.5/5 stars
Classic Rock	10/10
Mojo	4/5 stars
Q	4/5 stars
Record Collector	5/5 stars
Record Mirror	4/5 stars
The Rolling Stone Album Guide	4/5 stars
Sounds	5/5 stars
Uncut	9/10
The Village Voice	A−

New Boots and Panties!! received good reviews from the music press upon its release. Allan Jones in Melody Maker described the album as "a tense, harrowing account of urban degradation, that conveys with more vocal, musical and lyrical vehemence than any so-called 'new wave/punk' combo has yet been able to muster, the desperation and squalor of the social conditions (and the effects of those conditions upon individual personalities) it so provocatively illustrates." In Sounds Vivien Goldman gave the record a five-star rating, saying, "Lawless brats from council flats have finally found a voice that speaks from, of and about the people. A voice that combines passion with the vernacular 'she got into a mess with the NHS' – sage street advice, plus cinematic observation, plus humour." Record Mirror's Tim Lott observed that "if you can grapple with the sheer unorthodoxy of it it's easy to fall in love with for its quaintness, its limerick simplicity ... The character of New Boots and Panties is indomitable, like Dury. It's a curiosity piece and a pop album and a good joke and sometimes a bad pun and a shot of Bohemian romantics and a load of crap and totally fascinating." Roy Carr in the NME said:

.. it's impossible to bag Ian Dury, except to say that he has taken the essence of the Cockney music hall and utilised rock as a contemporary means of expression. On occasions, Ray Davies has dallied with a similar approach, but Dury has none of the self-conscious pretentions that Davies exposed in his flawed Flash Harry caricature. Ian Dury feels no need to adopt a transatlantic voice to comply with his subject matter, preferring to deliver ribald and bittersweet monologues in the tone of voice he was born with ... Whether or not you buy New Boots and Panties at least make hearing the album a priority. It's your loss if you pass.

In The Guardian Robin Denselow praised the honesty of Dury's songwriting, saying that the singer "has refined (if one can use such a word of Dury) his early style into a remarkable, distinctively London-orientated blend of cockney music hall, rock, and Bowie-style electronics. This is mixed, with no nonsense and no frills, with a set of powerful, forthright and honest lyrics that will send self-consciously daring punks scurrying back to the safety of their dole queue clichés. I admire him for the way he throws himself full tilt into his emotions, using a backdrop as squalid as the worst of the East End for songs of unashamed sexuality, admiration, or hate. The tribute songs – straight and never mawkish – are to Gene Vincent and to Dury's father, and equally honest are the demented, stream of consciousness tirades."

The album was not a hit in the US, but reviews by American critics were also positive. The music critic Robert Christgau was impressed by the album, writing, "The tenacious wit and accuracy of his lyrics betray how uncommon he believes his blockheaded protagonists really are, and his music rocks out in the traditional blues-based grooves without kissing the past's ass. Tender, furious, sexy, eccentric, surprising." Rolling Stone said, "A provocative combination of Toulouse-Lautrec and Chas Bukowski, Dury punks out in a laughingly distasteful way even as he sits on a cushion of personal warmth, feigning indifference. Whatever you choose to make of his talents, you won't be left untouched." In 1983's The New Rolling Stone Record Guide, John Swenson deemed it a "great" album.

Contemporary reviews have similarly praised the album. AllMusic said

Ian Dury's primary appeal lies in his lyrics, which are remarkably clever sketches of British life delivered with a wry wit. Since Dury's accent is thick and his language dense with local slang, much of these pleasures aren't discernible to casual listeners, leaving the music to stand on its own merits. On his debut album, New Boots and Panties!!, Dury's music is at its best, and even that is a bizarrely uneven fusion of pub rock, punk rock, and disco. Still, Dury's off-kilter charm and irrepressible energy make the album gel.

Reviewing the 1998 reissue, Tom Doyle of Q believed that "New Boots and Panties!! remains the creative yardstick he [Dury] can never quite measure up to", while in 2012 BBC Music stated, "Dury's work quickly mellowed (well, relatively), but the combination of cheeky ire, libertarianism and jazzed-up music hall punk on New Boots... was defiant, original and, 35 years later, stands as a mighty missing link between the Kinks and Blur." The Encyclopedia of Popular Music calls New Boots and Panties!! "the late Ian Dury's greatest album; rarely has a musical artist been so loved and respected ... He should be remembered for his dynamite band the Blockheads and this necessary album".

Critical reviews of the 40th anniversary box set in 2017 continued to praise the album. Terry Staunton of Uncut called New Boots and Panties!! "a calling card that dabbled in jazz, music hall, retro rock'n'roll and Kinks-ian character studies. [Dury] could have been dismissed as a Dickensian cartoon, were it not for the eloquence of his lyrics, his sly humour and the formidable musical range of his partner Chaz Jankel, whose playful arrangements brought depth and ballast to the odd-looking bloke at the mic." He concluded that neither of Dury's following two albums on Stiff Records "could match his debut's invention and charm". Record Collector's Daryl Easlea described the 40th anniversary edition as "a joy to behold" and that New Boots and Panties!! "remains a truly singular album full of magic and wonder. No small thanks to its coterie of characters, real and imaginary, that Dury brought along to so capture the imagination." Mark Blake of Q said, "You can hear late-'70s London all over these songs... Yet New Boots... is more than a period piece. It has endured. Punk's DIY ethos and rejection of conventional pop star glamour enabled Ian Dury rather than dictated to him. The man and his songs were too contrary to fit into any box or era." Summing up the record, he stated, "Forty years on, New Boots and Panties!! has lost few of its brilliant imperfections".

=== Accolades ===
New Boots and Panties!! was ranked at number 2 in the NME writers' list of the albums of the year for 1977 and at number 7 by Sounds.

In June 2000 Q magazine placed New Boots and Panties!! at number 66 in its list "The 100 Greatest British Albums ... Ever!" A similar list in July 2004 titled "50 Best British Albums Ever!" ranked New Boots and Panties!! at number 39. In its April 1998 list of the "50 Best Albums of the '70s" Q placed the album at number 43. In October 2013 NME placed New Boots and Panties!! at number 240 in its poll of writers past and present for The 500 Greatest Albums of All Time. It is ranked number 495 in the 2005 book version of Rolling Stone's 500 Greatest Albums of All Time. It was also listed in the book 1001 Albums You Must Hear Before You Die.

== Track listing ==
All tracks composed by Ian Dury and Chaz Jankel except where noted.

=== 1977 UK & Europe release ===
Side one

1. "Wake Up and Make Love with Me" – 4:23
2. "Sweet Gene Vincent" – 3:33
3. "I'm Partial to Your Abracadabra" – 3:13
4. "My Old Man" (Dury, Steve Nugent) – 3:40
5. "Billericay Dickie" (Dury, Nugent) – 4:17

Side two

6. "Clevor Trever" – 4:53
7. "If I Was with a Woman" – 3:24
8. "Blockheads" – 3:30
9. "Plaistow Patricia" (Dury, Nugent) – 4:13
10. "Blackmail Man" (Dury, Nugent) – 2:14
- "Sex & Drugs & Rock & Roll" appeared as the first track on side two of early repressings of the album, including a gold vinyl pressing in 1978, but was not credited on the sleeve or label.

=== 1978 & 2012 US & Canada releases ===
Includes all tracks from the UK version. "Sex & Drugs & Rock & Roll" appears as the first track on side two of all North American pressings, and is credited on the sleeve and on the label.
Side one

1. "Wake Up and Make Love with Me" – 4:23
2. "Sweet Gene Vincent" – 3:33
3. "I'm Partial to Your Abracadabra" – 3:13
4. "My Old Man" (Dury, Steve Nugent) – 3:40
5. "Billericay Dickie" (Dury, Nugent) – 4:17

Side two

6. "Sex & Drugs & Rock & Roll" – 3:04
7. "Clevor Trever" – 4:53
8. "If I Was with a Woman" – 3:24
9. "Blockheads" – 3:30
10. "Plaistow Patricia" (Dury, Nugent) – 4:13
11. "Blackmail Man" (Dury, Nugent) – 2:14

=== 1998 Hit Label/Repertoire/CNR Music bonus tracks ===
11. "Sex & Drugs & Rock & Roll" (single, August 1977) – 3:12
12. "Razzle in My Pocket" (B-side of "Sex & Drugs & Rock & Roll") – 2:55
13. "You're More Than Fair" (Dury, Russell Hardy) (B-side of "Sweet Gene Vincent") – 2:58
14. "England's Glory" [Live] (Dury, Rod Melvin) (performed by Ian and the Kilburns) – 3:27
15. "What a Waste" (Dury, Melvin) (single, April 1978) – 3:26

=== 2005 Edsel/Fuel 2000/True North 2-CD set ===
Bonus tracks

11. "Sex & Drugs & Rock & Roll" – 3:12
12. "Razzle in My Pocket" – 2:56
13. "You're More Than Fair" (Dury, Hardy) – 2:57
14. "England's Glory" [Live] (Dury, Melvin) – 3:29

Second disc (demo versions)

1. "Wake Up and Make Love with Me" – 4:03
2. "Sink My Boats" – 3:13
3. "Apples" – 4:05
4. "England's Glory" (Dury, Melvin) – 4:04
5. "Tell the Children" (Dury, Melvin) – 4:03
6. "I Made Mary Cry" (Dury, Hardy) (performed by Ian and the Kilburns) – 4:45
7. "Sweet Gene Vincent" [Backing Track] – 5:36
8. "Blackmail Man" (Dury, Nugent) – 2:10
9. "My Old Man" (Dury, Nugent) – 3:24
10. "Something's Going to Happen in the Winter" (Dury, Nugent) – 4:38
11. "Wifey" – 3:55
12. "Sink My Boats" [Alternate Version] – 4:19
13. "I'm Partial to Your Abracadabra" – 2:52
14. "If I Was with a Woman" – 3:22
15. "Sex & Drugs & Rock & Roll" – 3:44
16. "Clevor Trever" – 5:13
17. "Blockheads" – 4:16

=== 2007 Edsel 30th Anniversary CD/DVD ===
Bonus tracks

11. "Sex & Drugs & Rock & Roll" – 3:12
12. "Razzle in My Pocket" – 2:55
13. "Close to Home" (demo, January 1977) – 4:12
14. "Two Steep Hills" (performed by Ian and the Kilburns) – 2:52

DVD

Recorded at Queen Mary College, London on 10 December 1977 for the BBC television series Sight and Sound in Concert (series 2, episode 11).

1. "Sex & Drugs & Rock & Roll"
2. "I'm Partial to Your Abracadabra"
3. "Wake Up and Make Love with Me"
4. "Clevor Trever"
5. "Billericay Dickie"
6. "Sweet Gene Vincent"
7. "Blockheads"

=== 2017 40th anniversary box set ===
Disc one

As original album.

Disc two

1. "Sex & Drugs & Rock & Roll"
2. "Razzle in My Pocket"
3. "You're More Than Fair"
4. "England's Glory" (live)
5. "Close to Home"
6. "Two Steep Hills"
7. "Sex & Drugs & Rock & Roll" (BBC John Peel Session)*
8. "Clevor Trever" (BBC John Peel Session)*
9. "Sweet Gene Vincent" (BBC John Peel Session)*
10. "Blockheads" (BBC John Peel Session)*

*Recorded 30 November 1977, broadcast 12 December 1977

Disc three – Demo versions

1. "Wake Up and Make Love with Me" – 4:03
2. "Sink My Boats" – 3:13
3. "Apples" – 4:05
4. "England's Glory" (Dury, Melvin) – 4:04
5. "Tell the Children" (Dury, Melvin) – 4:03
6. "I Made Mary Cry" (Dury, Hardy) (performed by Ian and the Kilburns) – 4:45
7. "Sweet Gene Vincent" [Backing Track] – 5:36
8. "Blackmail Man" (Dury, Nugent) – 2:10
9. "My Old Man" (Dury, Nugent) – 3:24
10. "Something's Going to Happen in the Winter" (Dury, Nugent) – 4:38
11. "Wifey" – 3:55
12. "Sink My Boats" [Alternate Version] – 4:19
13. "I'm Partial to Your Abracadabra" – 2:52
14. "If I Was with a Woman" – 3:22
15. "Sex & Drugs & Rock & Roll" – 3:44
16. "Clevor Trever" – 5:13
17. "Blockheads" – 4:16

Disc four – Live at the Paris Theatre, London 01/07/1978

1. "Sex & Drugs and Rock and Roll"
2. "Wake Up and Make Love with Me"
3. "Clevor Trever"
4. "Plaistow Patricia"
5. "I Made Mary Cry"
6. "What a Waste"
7. "Blockheads"
8. "If I Was with a Woman"
9. "Upminster Kid"
10. "Sweet Gene Vincent"
11. "Sex & Drugs and Rock and Roll (Reprise)"

Vinyl

As original album.

== Personnel ==
- Ian Dury – vocals
- Chaz Jankel – guitars, keyboards
- Norman Watt-Roy – bass
- Charley Charles – drums

Additional personnel:

- Davey Payne – saxophones
- Edward Speight – ballad guitar
- Geoff Castle – Moog synthesizer
- Chris Gabrin – photography
- Barney Bubbles – brush lettering

Personnel on "You're More Than Fair", "England's Glory" and "I Made Mary Cry" (performed by Ian and the Kilburns):

- Ian Dury – vocals
- Giorgi Dionsiev – bass
- John "Irish" Earle – saxophone
- Malcolm Mortimore– drums
- Ed Speight – guitar

Credits on 2005 and 2017 'demo versions' discs:

- Charley Charles – drums on tracks 12, 15, 16 and 17
- Ian Dury – drums on tracks 8–11, 13 and 14
- Kuma Harada – bass on tracks 1–5
- Chaz Jankel – lead vocals on track 10, backing vocals on tracks 1–5, 12 and 14, guitar on tracks 1–5 and 7–17, bass on tracks 10, 13 and 14, keyboards on tracks 1–6 and 12, piano on tracks 13 and 15–17
- Steve Nugent – guitar on track 11
- Peter Van Hooke – drums on tracks 1–5
- Norman Watt-Roy – bass on tracks 12 and 15–17
- Tracks 1–5 recorded at Livingstone Studios, Barnet, London, July 1976
- Track 7 recorded at Pebble Beach Studios, Worthing, 1 December 1976
- Tracks 8–10 recorded at Alvic Studios, Wimbledon, London, February/March 1977
- Track 11 recorded at Alvic Studios, Wimbledon, 1976
- Tracks 12–17 recorded at Alvic Studios, Wimbledon, early 1977

== Re-releases ==
Edsel Records re-released the album in 2004 as part of a series of 2-Disc Ian Dury re-issues. The album was first reissued for the American market where "Sex & Drugs & Rock & Roll" was added to its track-list. Its initial CD re-issue on the Demon record label included an interview with Ian Dury that was on a 12" record packaged free with the original album.

Since then all CD re-issues have added the bonus tracks "Sex & Drugs & Rock & Roll", its B-side "Razzle in My Pocket", "You're More Than Fair" a re-recording of an old Kilburn & The Highroads song originally released on the B-side of the "Sweet Gene Vincent" single, and a live version of "England's Glory" by Ian Dury & The Kilburns (the final phase of Kilburn & The Highroads) that was originally released on a rare re-pressing of "Sex & Drugs & Rock & Roll", given away free by the New Musical Express. Also included on previous versions was "What a Waste" the first single credited to 'Ian Dury & the Blockheads' that included "Wake Up and Make Love with Me" as its B-side/double A-side. Edsel removed this from their version and instead included it on their re-issue of Do It Yourself.

Edsel's 2-Disc re-issue included a bonus disc of additional demos and recordings by Ian Dury and The Kilburns, including songs that would later appear on his albums Do It Yourself (1979) and Apples (1989) and an old Kilburn & The Highroads song "I Made Mary Cry" that would be continued with by Dury as late as 1978, with a live version appearing on his Straight From The Desk live album, released in 2001.

The album was again released in 2017 as a 4-CD and vinyl album box set to celebrate its 40th anniversary. A limited edition of 500 copies available exclusively through Amazon UK had the vinyl disc pressed on clear vinyl rather than the standard black vinyl.

== Charts ==
Chart (1977–79)	Peak position
Australian Albums (Kent Music Report)	13
German Albums (Offizielle Top 100)	29
New Zealand Albums (RMNZ)	7
Swedish Albums (Sverigetopplistan)	40
UK Albums (Official Charts)	5

== Certifications ==
Region	Certification	Certified units/sales
United Kingdom (BPI)	Platinum	300,000^{^}
^{^} Shipments figures based on certification alone.

== Release history ==
Region	Date	Label	Format	Catalog
United Kingdom & Europe	30 September 1977	Stiff	LP	SEEZ 4
United Kingdom & Europe	30 September 1977	Stiff	cassette	ZSEEZ 4
United States & Canada	1978	Stiff	LP (1st pressing)	STF 0002
United States & Canada	1978	Stiff America	LP (2nd pressing)	USE-2
United Kingdom	1986	Demon	LP	FIEND 63
United Kingdom	1986	Demon	cassette	FIEND CASS 63
United Kingdom	1986	Demon	CD	FIEND CD 63
United Kingdom	1998	The Hit Label	CD	AHLCD 57
Germany	1998	Repertoire	CD	REP 4546-WY
Europe	1998	CNR Music	CD	ARC 10029-2
United States	14 June 2005	Fuel 2000	2-CD set	302 061 478 2
United Kingdom	12 September 2005	Edsel	2-CD set	MEDCD 751
Canada	4 October 2005	True North	2-CD set	TND 387
United Kingdom	22 October 2007	Edsel	CD + DVD	EDSX 3001
United Kingdom	11 April 2011	Simply Vinyl	180-gram vinyl LP	SVLP 510
United States	17 July 2012	Drastic Plastic	180-gram vinyl LP	DPRLP24
United Kingdom	27 October 2017	Edsel	4-CD + vinyl box set	NBAPBOX01

== Brand New Boots and Panties ==
After Dury's death, the album was remade in 2001 as a tribute album under the title Brand New Boots And Panties. Except for "My Old Man" and "Billericay Dickie", the Blockheads played on all the tracks, with vocals provided by various others:

1. Sinéad O'Connor: "Wake Up and Make Love with Me" – 4:59
2. Robbie Williams: "Sweet Gene Vincent" – 4:07
3. Paul McCartney: "I'm Partial to Your Abracadabra" – 3:31
4. Madness: "My Old Man" – 3:13
5. Billy Bragg & the Blokes: "Billericay Dickie" – 4:43
6. Wreckless Eric: "Clevor Trever" – 6:15
7. Cerys Matthews: "If I Was with a Woman" – 3:34
8. Grant Nicholas: "Blockheads" – 4:07
9. Shane MacGowan: "Plaistow Patricia" – 4:03
10. Keith Allen: "Blackmail Man" – 2:14

The album was produced by Dury's long-time producer Laurie Latham, with the exceptions of "My Old Man" (produced by Madness' usual producers Clive Langer and Alan Winstanley), "Billericay Dickie" (produced by Bragg's producer Grant Showbiz) and "Clevor Trever", which Latham co-produced with Wreckless Eric.

Billy Bragg & the Blokes chose to give "Billericay Dickie" a more Indian feel, a style they used on Bragg's album England, Half-English the following year: the song was subsequently included as the opening track on the bonus disc of the 2006 re-issue of the album. Madness' "My Old Man" was likewise performed much more in their style than that of the Blockheads'. Sinéad O'Connor chose to change the words of "Wake Up and Make Love with Me" so the sex of the song's narrator was a woman; Cerys Matthews chose not to do the same with "If I Was with a Woman". Wreckless Eric, for whom "Clevor Trever" was originally written, meandered and mumbled during the latter half of the song, over a long instrumental extemporisation, extending it to nearly double its original length. Other musicians featured on the album include Jools Holland (piano), Steve Sidwell (trumpet), Sam Brown (vocals), Steve Howe (guitar), Dylan Howe (drums). The album's cover art featured a painting of Ian Dury by pop artist Peter Blake, a former teacher and long-time friend of Dury's.

== Bibliography ==
- Balls, Richard (2000). Sex and Drugs and Rock and Roll: The Life of Ian Dury. London: Omnibus Press. ISBN 978-0-7119-7721-1.
- Drury, Jim (2004). Ian Dury and the Blockheads: Song by Song. London: Sanctuary Publishing. ISBN 978-1-86074-557-7.
- Kent, David (1993). Australian Chart Book 1970–1992. St Ives, NSW, Australia: Australian Chart Book. ISBN 0-646-11917-6.
- Larkin, Colin (2011). "Dury, Ian". The Encyclopedia of Popular Music (5th concise ed.). London: Omnibus Press. ISBN 978-0-85712-595-8.
- Levy, Joe, ed. (2005). Rolling Stone's 500 Greatest Albums of All Time. New York: Wenner Books. ISBN 978-1-932958-01-0.
- Swenson, John (1983). "Ian Dury". In Marsh, Dave; Swenson, John (eds.). The New Rolling Stone Record Guide (2nd ed.). New York: Random House/Rolling Stone Press. ISBN 0-394-72107-1.
- Original copy of the vinyl LP. Cat No SEEZ 4
