= Hit Me with Your Rhythm Stick =

Single by Ian and the Blockheads
- B-side: "There Ain't Half Been Some Clever Bastards"
- Released: 1 December 1978
- Recorded: 1978
- Studio: The Workhouse Studio, London
- Genre: New wave; pub rock; disco; funk; post-punk; dance-rock
- Length: 3:43
- Label: Stiff
- Songwriters: Ian Dury; Chaz Jankel
- Producer: Laurie Latham

Ian and the Blockheads singles chronology
"What a Waste" (1978)	"Hit Me with Your Rhythm Stick" (1978)	"Reasons to be Cheerful, Part 3" (1979)

Official video
- "Hit Me with Your Rhythm Stick" on YouTube

"Hit Me with Your Rhythm Stick" is a song by Ian Dury and the Blockheads, first released as a single on Stiff Records in the UK on 1 December 1978 and credited to "Ian & the Blockheads". Written by Dury and the Blockheads' multi-instrumentalist Chaz Jankel, it is the group's most successful single, reaching number one on the UK singles chart in January 1979 as well as reaching the top three in Ireland, Australia and New Zealand, and it was also a top 20 hit in several European countries.

"Hit Me with Your Rhythm Stick" was named the 12th best single of 1978 by the writers of British music magazine NME, and best single of 1979 in the annual 'Pazz & Jop' poll organised by music critic Robert Christgau in The Village Voice. It was also named the 3rd best post-punk 7" ever made by Fact magazine. By September 2017, it had sold over 1.29 million copies in the UK, making it the 114th biggest selling single of all time in the UK.

== Composition ==
Co-writer Chaz Jankel has repeated a story both in Sex & Drugs & Rock & Roll: The Life of Ian Dury and Ian Dury & The Blockheads: Song by Song that the song was written in Rolvenden, Kent during a jamming session between him and Dury. Jankel relates that the music was inspired by a funky piano part near the end of "Wake Up and Make Love with Me", the opening track on Dury's 1977 debut album New Boots and Panties!!

Dury mentioned a number of origins for his lyrics, including claiming that he had written them up to three years earlier and it had just taken him all that time to realise their quality. Blockheads guitarist John Turnbull gives a different account, claiming the lyrics were written while on tour in America six months prior to the song's recording and that he was still adjusting in-studio.

Whilst researching his book Ian Dury: The Definitive Biography, Will Birch discovered that Dury wrote the lyrics for "Hit Me with Your Rhythm Stick" as early as 1976. Ian's typed manuscript, which differs only slightly from the later recorded version and with hand written notes about arrangement and instrumentation ('drums and fuzz bass doing Roy Buchanan volume trick' after first chorus, for example), was posted to a friend in September of that year. The 'lunatic' line reads 'one two three fourithmatic'. 'O'er the hills and far away' was originally 'down to Hammersmith Broadway'. The manuscript, complete with handwritten annotations, was reproduced in Hallo Sausages, the book of Dury's lyrics compiled by his daughter Jemima. According to Jemima it appeared that the origins of the song could be traced as far back as 1974.

The song is noted for a complex 16-notes-to-the-bar bassline played by Norman Watt-Roy, and the saxophone solo in the instrumental break in which Davey Payne plays two saxophones simultaneously. It mentions endangered languages of Canadian First Nations Peoples in the lyrics, "Eskimo, Arapaho / Move their body to and fro" While the former is now dated and considered offensive, this has led to it spreading awareness of Arapaho and other Algonquian and Indigenous Canadian languages.

== Recording ==
The song was recorded in The Workhouse Studio on the Old Kent Road, London, the same place Dury's debut album New Boots and Panties!! had been recorded. It was produced by Laurie Latham, who had been producing Dury's records since his debut solo single "Sex & Drugs & Rock & Roll" in August 1977, although Latham is uncredited on the single. The song was recorded live with all the Blockheads placed in different positions in the studio's live area, with Jankel playing a Bechstein grand piano, Mickey Gallagher playing the Hammond organ, and Dury sat on a stool in the centre singing into a hand-held microphone.

At least 11 takes of the song were recorded before one, reportedly an early take, was chosen for the single release. Gallagher remains jaded about this method, and much of the band as well as producer Latham remain unhappy with the chosen take's mix, claiming it to be too dominated by piano and vocals. Latham said later:

"I was never happy with the mix anyway. My authority had diminished [since the recording of New Boots and Panties!!] and it was a complete free-for-all, with the whole band in there while Chaz basically took over and pushed faders around ... I myself wasn't entirely happy because I didn't think we could hear enough bass, but then I'm never happy with mixes ... The piano sound was another thing I was unhappy with. Because we did it live, I didn't have enough compressors – God knows why we didn't hire more equipment. On a track like that the piano needs a bit of compression and dynamically some sorting out. Well, to me it sounds like it's getting lost in certain places where it shouldn't, such as [the end of the saxophone solo]. The piano sort of disappears at that point. It gets very roomy and ambient. Still, in the end I suppose all these blemishes give the track a certain character, and if people do talk about the bass then that suggests they can hear it."

Despite this, Chaz Jankel often re-tells the story that after recording it he phoned his mother and told her, "I've just recorded my first number one."

== Release and promotion ==
On radio "Hit Me with Your Rhythm Stick" was a popular song from its release, but in the UK the single was initially kept from the number one position on the charts for two weeks by the Village People's hit "Y.M.C.A.", which was number one for three consecutive weeks. On 27 January 1979, however, Turnbull, Watt-Roy and drummer Charley Charles were waiting outside the Gaumont State Cinema, Kilburn, London, listening to a car radio when it was announced that "Hit Me with Your Rhythm Stick" was the new number one. Dury was on holiday in Cannes, and was at the beach when the hotel staff brought him a bottle of champagne and told him the news. For their appearance on the British music television programme Top of the Pops, the whole band bought Moss Bros suits. The promotional video for the single was made by Laurie Lewis, a friend of Dury's from Walthamstow Art School who had been studying film-making. The video simply showed the band performing on stage.

As sales of the single approached the one million mark, in February 1979 Stiff announced that the record would be deleted when it reached the milestone, and the dealer ordering the millionth copy of the single would receive a "mystery prize". However, sales stalled at 979,000 during the single's original chart run, and it was not until downloads were made eligible for inclusion on the UK singles chart, from 2004 onwards, that "Hit Me with Your Rhythm Stick" finally became a million-seller.

The song has been used for numerous purposes since its release including various adverts (including one in 2006 for financial company Capital One) and in numerous films and television programmes including the Doctor Who episode "Tooth and Claw" and the 1979 film adaption of Porridge.

Like many of Ian Dury's standalone singles, and in keeping with his policy then of not including singles on his albums, the song was omitted from Do It Yourself, the next Ian Dury & the Blockheads album.

Though none of the 11+ takes of the original song have been released, two live versions exist on Dury's two live albums Warts 'n' Audience and Straight from the Desk, both including ad libs in the song's third verse; the Warts 'n' Audience version name checking Brixton Academy and the Straight from the Desk version name checking Dagenham Heathway.

Paul Hardcastle remixed the track in 1985, stripping all the instrumental tracks and using only Dury's vocal, and re-recording the instrumental parts with keyboards. The remix reached number 55 on the UK Singles Chart. Another remix of the track by Dean Thatcher and Jagz Kooner was released in 1991 which reached number 73 on the chart.

The song was re-released on 12" green vinyl for Record Store Day 2021.

== B-side ==
The B-side was "There Ain't Half Been Some Clever Bastards", written by Dury and Russell Hardy, his co-writer from their time in the pub-rock band Kilburn and the High Roads. The song affectionately describes the achievements of Noël Coward, Vincent van Gogh and Albert Einstein in a working class (specifically Cockney) manner and amusingly describes Leonardo da Vinci as an 'Italian geezer'. According to Jemima Dury, her father had deliberately chosen to put one of the Kilburns' old songs on the B-side, knowing that the single was likely to be a big hit and that Hardy and their previous managers (who part-owned the publishing company to which Dury and Hardy had been signed) would benefit financially.

== Track listings ==
All tracks written and composed by Ian Dury and Chaz Jankel, except where indicated.

=== 1978 original release ===
- 7" single
1. "Hit Me with Your Rhythm Stick" – 3:43
2. "There Ain't Half Been Some Clever Bastards" (Dury, Russell Hardy) – 2:59
- 12" single
1. "Hit Me with Your Rhythm Stick" – 3:58
2. "There Ain't Half Been Some Clever Bastards" (Dury, Hardy) – 2:59

The 12" version of the single features a different mix of "Hit Me with Your Rhythm Stick" to the 7" version. The two sides of the single are labelled "A Wing" and "B Wing", in reference to prison blocks. The A-side has the caption "6_ Tricks, Points %✓" while the B-side has the captions "Late start high on fence" and "Segovia rules" printed on the label. "Hit Me with Your Rhythm Stick" is credited to "Ian & the Blockheads – Under the musical direction of Chaz Jankel", while "There Ain't Half Been Some Clever Bastards" is credited to the musicians individually as "Michael Gallagher, John Turnbull, Davey Payne, Norman Watt-Roy, Charlie Charles, Chaz Blockhead and Ian Blockhead".

The cover of the single credits "There Ain't Half Been Some Clever Bastards" to "ID and the Blocks". The cover was designed by Stiff's Barney Bubbles, anonymously as usual.

=== 1979 US & Canada "Disco Single" release ===
- 12" single
1. "Hit Me with Your Rhythm Stick" (disco version) – 5:20
2. "Reasons to be Cheerful, Part 3" (Dury, Davey Payne, Jankel) – 4:53

=== 1985 remix ===
All tracks remixed by Paul Hardcastle.

- 7" single
1. "Hit Me with Your Rhythm Stick" – 4:11
2. "Sex & Drugs & Rock & Roll" – 3:20
- 12" single
1. "Hit Me with Your Rhythm Stick" – 4:11
2. "Sex & Drugs & Rock & Roll" – 3:20
3. "Reasons to be Cheerful" (Dury, Payne, Jankel) – 4:48
4. "Wake Up (And Make Love to Me)" – 2:53

=== 1991 remix ===
Remixed by Dean Thatcher and Jagz for Flying Vinyl.

- 7" single
1. "Hit Me with Your Rhythm Stick '91" (The Flying remix) – 3:54
2. "Hit Me with Your Rhythm Stick" (original version) – 3:42
- 12" single
1. "Hit Me with Your Rhythm Stick '91" (The Flying remix) – 6:50
2. "Hit Me with Your Rhythm Stick" (original version) – 3:42
3. "Hit Me with Your Rhythm Stick" (live version) – 5:18
- CD single
1. "Hit Me with Your Rhythm Stick '91" (The Flying remix 7" version) – 3:54
2. "Hit Me with Your Rhythm Stick '91" (The Flying remix 12" version) – 6:50
3. "Hit Me with Your Rhythm Stick" (original version) – 3:42
4. "Hit Me with Your Rhythm Stick" (live version) – 5:18

== Charts and certifications ==
=== Weekly charts ===
Weekly chart performance for "Hit Me with Your Rhythm Stick"
Chart (1978–1979)	Peak position
Australia (Kent Music Report)	2
Austria (Ö3 Austria Top 40)	12
Belgium (Ultratip Bubbling Under Flanders)	14
Ireland (IRMA)	3
Netherlands (Dutch Top 40)	9
Netherlands (Single Top 100)	9
New Zealand (Recorded Music NZ)	3
Norway (VG-lista)	7
Sweden (Sverigetopplistan)	9
UK Singles (Official Charts)	1
West Germany (GfK)	22

Weekly chart performance for "Hit Me with Your Rhythm Stick"
Chart (1985)	Peak position
UK Singles (OCC)	55

Weekly chart performance for "Hit Me with Your Rhythm Stick"
Chart (1991)	Peak position
UK Singles (OCC)	73
UK Dance (Music Week)	42

=== Year-end charts ===
Year-end chart performance for "Hit Me with Your Rhythm Stick"
Chart (1979)	Position
Australia (Kent Music Report)	27
Netherlands (Dutch Top 40)	97
UK Singles (OCC)	13

=== Certifications ===
Certifications for "Hit Me with Your Rhythm Stick"
Region	Certification	Certified units/sales
United Kingdom (BPI)	Gold	1,129,369

== Bibliography ==
- Balls, Richard (2000). Sex and Drugs and Rock and Roll: The Life of Ian Dury. London, England: Omnibus Press. ISBN 978-0-7119-7721-1.
- Drury, Jim (2004). Ian Dury and the Blockheads: Song by Song. London, England: Sanctuary Publishing. ISBN 978-1-86074-557-7.
- Birch, Will (2010). Ian Dury: The Definitive Biography. London, England: Pan. ISBN 978-0-330-51148-3.
