= Do It Yourself (Ian Dury & the Blockheads album) =

Studio album by Ian Dury & the Blockheads
- Released: 18 May 1979
- Recorded: 1978
- Studios: The Workhouse, Old Kent Road, London
- Genres: Pub rock; disco; funk
- Length: 40:48
- Labels: Stiff (UK & US), Epic (US)
- Producers: Chaz Jankel; Laurie Latham

Ian Dury chronology
New Boots and Panties!! (1977)	Do It Yourself (1979)	Laughter (1980)

Singles from Do It Yourself
- 1. "Inbetweenies" Released: 1979

Professional ratings
Review scores
Source	Rating
AllMusic	4.5/5 stars
Smash Hits	9/10
The Village Voice	B

Do It Yourself is a 1979 album by Ian Dury & the Blockheads. It was the first album to be credited to Ian Dury & the Blockheads rather than Ian Dury alone, although Dury had used the full band name for the "What a Waste" 7" single of 1978. The album was released in the wake of the chart-topping hit single "Hit Me with Your Rhythm Stick", and reached number two in the charts, behind ABBA's Voulez-Vous. Do It Yourself sold around 200,000 copies, and was Dury's second Platinum album (after its predecessor New Boots and Panties!!).

== Background and recording ==
Like New Boots and Panties!! before it, much of Do It Yourself was written at Dury's home, no longer a flat near the Oval cricket ground, but now a rented home in Rolvenden, Kent. Even though he declined point blank his management's attempts to get him to dust off and re-record old Kilburn & the High Roads songs like "England's Glory" Dury did resurrect one old song, "Sink My Boats", the very first song he and Chaz Jankel wrote together. In fact, a number of other songs pre-date the rehearsal and songwriting sessions for Do It Yourself; the instrumentals for "Quiet", "This Is What We Find" and "Uneasy Sunny Day Hotsy Totsy" were all arranged by Blockheads members while they were still in their band Loving Awareness.

The recording session at Dury's house that also produced "Hit Me with Your Rhythm Stick" was used to demo some of the new songs. These demos, later released on Edsel Records' 2-CD re-issue of the album, were for "This Is What We Find", "Inbetweenies", "Quiet" and "Uneasy Sunny Day Hotsy Totsy", along with the first version of "Duff 'Em Up and Do 'Em Over (Boogie Woogie)", a song that would remain unreleased but would eventually become the song "Oh Mr. Peanut" on the next album, Laughter.

Do It Yourself was recorded in the Workhouse Studios on the Old Kent Road, the same place where New Boots and Panties!! had been recorded two years earlier, under the production of Jankel and Latham, though Latham's credit was as 'recording engineer'.

In keeping with Dury's policy of not including singles on albums, "Hit Me with Your Rhythm Stick" was omitted, and no singles were released from the album either (his next British single would be "Reasons to be Cheerful, Part 3"). Most retrospective interviews with band and management bemoan this. and nearly all suggest the opening track "Inbetweenies" as the ideal choice of single; "Inbetweenies" was released in Europe, backed with "Dance of the Screamers". The lack of singles on the album did not greatly affect its chart performance.

== Packaging ==
Do It Yourself was released on 18 May 1979 with an unusually large publicity drive; in addition to widespread print advertising in the music press, Stiff Records released the album with at least 34 known alternative sleeves, each one featuring a different Crown Wallpaper design. Each sleeve has the Crown catalogue number for the particular wallpaper design in the bottom left hand corner. Crown also wallpapered all of the sets for the Blockheads' subsequent promotional tour. The numerous sleeves greatly helped sales, and there were reports of 'completist' fans travelling to different towns and even importing more sleeves that were only released abroad. In addition, Stiff commissioned a wide variety of promotional merchandise, with various badges, combs, watches, paint brushes, paints pots, bags, clocks and wallpaper distributed.

The sleeve and all the promotional material were the creations of graphic designer Barney Bubbles, who also created the Blockheads' 'clockface' logo. A number of the promotional items designed by Bubbles can be seen in the booklet for Ian Dury & the Blockheads' final album Ten More Turnips from the Tip.

== Re-issues ==
The album was reissued by Edsel Records as part of an Ian Dury 2-disc re-issue series. Previously it had been reissued by Demon Records, once without bonus tracks, then again by Repertoire with "Hit Me With Your Rhythm Stick", "There Ain't Half Been Some Clever Bastards", "Reasons to be Cheerful, Part 3", "Common As Muck", "I Want To Be Straight", "That's Not All" (the A and B sides of the three singles released around the time of Do It Yourself and the 12" extended mix of "Reasons To Be Cheerful" as bonus tracks. Edsel changed the bonus tracks, removing "I Want To Be Straight" and its B-side "That's Not All" and replacing them with "What A Waste". This is, in fact, a more fitting set of bonus tracks, as "I Want To Be Straight" was released nearly a year after Do It Yourself and features a different Blockheads line-up (including Dr. Feelgood's Wilko Johnson), the same line-up that plays on the album Laughter (Edsel's re-issue of Laughter includes both tracks), whereas "What A Waste" was played by the original Blockheads line-up that plays on Do It Yourself.

Edsel's current re-issue also features a bonus disc that includes the demos recorded at Dury's house in Kent and 10 tracks recorded on the Stiff's Live Stiff's tour in 1977. These songs are different from the three included on the LP of the tour released the previous year.

== Track listing ==
All lyrics are written by Ian Dury; all music is composed by Chaz Jankel except where indicated.

Side 1
No.	Title	Music	Length
1.	"Inbetweenies"		5:18
2.	"Quiet"	John Turnbull, Mick Gallagher, Norman Watt-Roy, Charley Charles	3:31
3.	"Don't Ask Me"		3:17
4.	"Sink My Boats"		4:12
5.	"Waiting for Your Taxi"		2:52

Side 2
No.	Title	Music	Length
6.	"This Is What We Find"	Gallagher	4:10
7.	"Uneasy Sunny Day Hotsy-Totsy"	Turnbull	2:10
8.	"Mischief"	Watt-Roy, Gallagher	3:33
9.	"Dance of the Screamers"		6:40
10.	"Lullaby for Francis/Frances"		5:02

- Track 10 is listed on the cover and original side 2 label with "i" above the rest of the title and "e" below it. Some reissues of the album (like the 2CD Edsel release) print it as "Franci/es" on the back cover.

=== Bonus tracks (1996 Repertoire release) ===
No.	Title	Music	Length
11.	"Hit Me with Your Rhythm Stick" (Non-album single, 1978)		3:42
12.	"There Ain't Half Been Some Clever Bastards" (B-side of "Hit Me with Your Rhythm Stick")	Russell Hardy	3:01
13.	"Reasons to Be Cheerful, Part 3" (Non-album single, 1979)	Jankel, Davey Payne	4:44
14.	"Common as Muck" (B-side of "Reasons to Be Cheerful, Part 3")		3:58
15.	"I Want to Be Straight" (Non-album single, 1980)	Gallagher	3:17
16.	"That's Not All" (B-side of "I Want to Be Straight")	Payne	2:47
17.	"Reasons to Be Cheerful, Part 3" (12" version)	Jankel, Payne	6:40

=== Bonus tracks (2004 2-CD Edsel release) ===
No.	Title	Music	Length
11.	"What a Waste" (Non-album single, 1978)	Rod Melvin	3:26
12.	"Hit Me with Your Rhythm Stick"		4:05
13.	"There Ain't Half Been Some Clever Bastards"	Hardy	3:01
14.	"Reasons to Be Cheerful, Part 3"	Payne, Jankel	4:44
15.	"Common as Muck"		3:58
16.	"Reasons to Be Cheerful, Part 3" (12" version)	Payne, Jankel	6:40

=== Bonus disc (2004 2-CD Edsel release) ===
Demos
No.	Title	Music	Length
1.	"This Is What We Find"	Gallagher	4:48
2.	"Boogie Woogie" (aka "Duff 'Em Up")	Gallagher	4:02
3.	"Quiet"	Turnbull, Gallagher, Watt-Roy, Charles	3:50
4.	"Inbetweenies" (backing track)		5:25
5.	"Babies Kept Quiet" (aka "Uneasy Sunny Day Hotsy Totsy")	Turnbull	2:54
6.	"Blow" (instrumental)	Jankel, Turnbull, Gallagher, Watt-Roy, Payne, Charles	5:21

From the "Stiff’s Live Stiffs" tour, 1977
No.	Title	Music	Length
7.	"Sex & Drugs & Rock & Roll" (live)		5:29
8.	"I'm Partial to Your Abracadabra" (live)		3:06
9.	"Wake Up and Make Love with Me" (live)		4:31
10.	"Clevor Trever" (live)		5:20
11.	"Sweet Gene Vincent" (live)		4:25
12.	"Billericay Dickie" (live)	Steve Nugent	3:41
13.	"My Old Man" (live)	Nugent	3:46
14.	"If I Was with a Woman" (live)		4:07
15.	"Blockheads" (live)		4:02
16.	"Plaistow Patricia" (live)	Nugent	4:10
17.	"Blackmail Man" (live)	Nugent	4:04

- Tracks 1–6 recorded at Ian Dury's house, Rolvenden, Kent, November 1978
- Tracks 7–17 recorded live at Leicester University, 22 October 1977

== Personnel ==
Ian Dury & the Blockheads

- Ian Dury – vocals
- Chaz Jankel – keyboards, guitars, musical direction
- John Turnbull – guitars
- Mick Gallagher – keyboards
- Davey Payne – saxophones
- Norman Watt-Roy – bass
- Charley Charles – drums
- The Breezeblocks – backing vocals

Technical

- Chaz Jankel – producer
- Laurie Latham – producer, engineer
- Edwin Cross – second engineer
- Barney Bubbles – sleeve design

Additional musician

- Wilko Johnson – guitar on "I Want to Be Straight" and "That's Not All"

== Sources ==
- Sex and Drugs and Rock and Roll: The Life of Ian Dury by Richard Balls, first published 2000, Omnibus Press
- Ian Dury & the Blockheads: Song by Song by Jim Drury, first published 2003, Sanctuary Publishing
- Reasons to Be Cheerful 2-Disc compilation first released 1996, Repertoire Records
