= Billericay Dickie =

Song by Ian Dury

from the album New Boots and Panties
- Released: 1977
- Recorded: 1977
- Genre: Music hall
- Length: 4:24
- Label: Stiff Records
- Songwriters: Ian Dury, Steve Nugent
- Producers: Peter Jenner, Laurie Latham, Rick Walton

Official audio
- "Billericay Dickie" on YouTube

"Billericay Dickie" is a song by Ian Dury, from his debut album New Boots and Panties!!. It is narrated by a bragging bricklayer from Billericay, and is filled with name-checks for places in Essex. The song is based around naughty rhymes such as:

I had a love affair with Nina
in the back of my Cortina
A seasoned up hyena
could not have been more obscener
She took me to the cleaners
and other misdemeanours;
but I got right up between her
rum and her ribena.

Each verse tells a different short story, relating one of Dickie's sexual conquests around south-eastern England, while in the choruses the character insists he is a caring, conscientious lover and 'not a thickie', even giving the names of two girls ("a pair of squeaky chickies") as references to attest this. Dickie is a character most commonly referred to in the media as an 'Essex lad'. The song, perhaps the best example of Dury's 'Englishness' and 'Essexness', was given its oompah, fairground like arrangement by an American, Steve Nugent.

Ian Dury stated on numerous occasions (as mentioned in both his biographies, Sex and Drugs and Rock and Roll: The Life of Ian Dury and Ian Dury & The Blockheads: Song By Song) that he saw Dickie as a pathetic figure. He would reflect this on-stage by breaking down, as if he were about to cry during the final part of the song, before returning to normal, to shout the final lines of the final verse. The song was rarely used as an opening track for live sets (another song from New Boots and Panties!!, "Wake Up and Make Love with Me", was used instead), but it does open the set recorded live at the Hammersmith Odeon, in 1985, that was released as the Hold Onto Your Structure VHS/DVD. Live versions can be found on both of Dury's live albums Warts 'n' Audience and Straight from the Desk.

I believe I, Anthony Stacey, was the inspiration for this song, although I have no evidence or proof of such. I met Ian Dury and a friend of his in South Green Billericay, I believe in 1971. I always remember his club foot and his professed profession as a poet. As for me, a founder member of the Billericay Bastards, dressed in what ordinary people would describe as a Hells Angel, we engaged in conversation, when, he said something along the lines of, "how do you fare with the birds, dressed like that!" I reeled off several female names that I had had liaisons with that week and finished off with, "I think I'm doing rather Well." This coincides with the contents of the song, but like I say, I only have my memory as proof.

In Australia, the song formed the basis of the jingle in ads for cleaning product Ajax Spray n' Wipe. The ad campaign ran from 1988 to 2010.

== Sources ==
- Balls, Richard (1 September 2000). Sex And Drugs And Rock And Roll: The Life Of Ian Dury. Omnibus Press. ISBN 1849387729.
- Dury, Jim (7 March 2005). Ian Dury and the Blockheads: Song by Song (Sanctuary Encores). Sanctuary Publishing Ltd. ISBN 1860746489.
- Reasons To Be Cheerful 2-Disc Compilation first released 1996, Repertoire Records "Ian Dury And The Blockheads – Reasons To Be Cheerful". Discogs. August 1996.
- New Boots And Panties!! — label credit on Stiff Records SEEZ 4, released 1977 "Ian Dury – New Boots And Panties!!". Discogs. 30 September 1977.
