= Reasons to Be Cheerful, Part 3 =

Single by Ian Dury and the Blockheads
- B-side: "Common as Muck"
- Released: 27 July 1979
- Studio: Eretcia Studios (Rome)
- Genre: Proto-rap
- Length: 4:43, 6:41 (12" version)
- Label: Stiff
- Songwriters: Ian Dury; Chaz Jankel; Davey Payne
- Producer: Chaz Jankel

Ian Dury and the Blockheads singles chronology
"Hit Me with Your Rhythm Stick" (1978)	"Reasons to Be Cheerful, Part 3" (1979)	"I Want to Be Straight" (1980)

Music video
- "Reasons To Be Cheerful, Pt. 3" (Official Lyrics Video) on YouTube

"Reasons to Be Cheerful, Part 3" is a song by Ian Dury and the Blockheads, initially released as the single "Reasons to be Cheerful, Part 3 / Common as Muck" on 27 July 1979, which reached number 3 on the UK singles chart the following month. It is the last single to be released by the band in their original line-up. Parts 1 and 2 do not exist.

== Recording ==
"Reasons to Be Cheerful, Part 3" was not recorded at The Workhouse, Old Kent Road with the material that made up the Do It Yourself album, but instead at Eretcia Studios (owned by RCA) in Rome during a break in a long European tour. According to its writer, Ian Dury, the song was inspired by a near-fatal accident involving a lighting roadie. Roadie Charley almost got electrocuted in Italy by a microphone stand while leaning over a mixing desk. Another roadie saved his life, hence "no electric shocks" is included in the song's lyrics. The incident led to the Italian shows being cancelled. There was almost a fight with a gang of youths outside a venue. The song was written in the band's hotel in Rome during the aftermath of the electrical incident. Dury said, "there were two songs that we didn't put on Do it Yourself that were even more miserable than the ones that we did put on it. So, it seemed sensible to cheer up a bit. In a way, it was inspired by the Sergeant Pepper's sleeve... just a load of nice people. I write quite a lot of songs that are just lists."

Saxophonist Davey Payne was upset about the financial disparities within Dury's band, so in order to placate him, Dury told co-writer Chaz Jankel to incorporate a sax solo in the middle, which Payne could improvise and thus earn a share in the song.

== Composition ==
The song has been described as a "shopping-list song". It is a simple list of a number of reasons to be cheerful. In that respect it is almost identical to an older Ian Dury track, "England's Glory", a song that he had refused to revive when asked the previous year. The list of reasons to be cheerful includes:

- Rock 'n' roll singer Buddy Holly
- Little Richard's 1956 hit "Good Golly, Miss Molly"
- Hammersmith Palais, London
- The Bolshoi Ballet of Moscow, Russia
- British automobile company Scammell (specifically their 18-wheeler truck)
- Equal voting rights
- Piccadilly Circus, London
- Genitalia ("Fanny Smith and Willy")
- Oatmeal breakfast cereal ("porridge oats")
- Generosity and politeness
- Yellow socks
- Carrot juice
- Wine (specifically claret)
- Elvis (Presley) and Scotty (Moore), his guitarist
- Going to the toilet ("sitting on the potty")
- A cure for smallpox
- The National Health Service's free prescription glasses
- Male and female prostitutes ("gigolos and brasses")
- Smoking a bong ("lighting up the chalice")
- Skiffle singer Wee Willie Harris
- Steve Biko
- Jamaican trombonist Rico Rodriguez, who would go on to play with Coventry band the Specials the same year as "Reasons to be Cheerful"'s release
- The Marx Brothers ("Harpo, Groucho, Chico")
- Popular British sandwich ("cheddar cheese and pickle")
- British motorcycle manufacturer Vincent Motorcycles (pronounced in the song as "motorsickle", to rhyme with pickle and tickle)
- Sex ("slap and tickle")
- American comedian Woody Allen
- Spanish painter Salvador Dalí
- Russian composer Dmitri Shostakovich
- The opera Don Pasquale by Gaetano Donizetti
- The popular song "Volare"
- Soul singer Smokey Robinson
- Being released from prison ("Coming out of chokey")
- Saying "okey-dokey"
- Being naked ("Being in my nuddy")
- Jazz saxophonist John Coltrane, specifically his soprano saxophone playing
- Italian singer-songwriter Adriano Celentano
- 1940s and 1950s film actor Bonar Colleano
- Self-education ("something nice to study")

The single's B-side, "Common as Muck", is a celebration of being "common" (working class). Like its A-side, it is filled with name checks of disparate celebrities, including Lionel Blair, Evonne Goolagong, Patience Strong, Jack Palance, Sydney Tafler, Fred Astaire, Shirley Abicair, Victor Hugo, Dirk Bogarde and Nellie Melba. Nellie Dean refers to the well-known music hall song of that name, while Rodney Reigate is a purely fictitious character.

== Re-releases and versions ==
In keeping with his singles policy at the time, "Reasons to Be Cheerful" was omitted from the next album (Laughter) and was not made available again. It first re-appeared on the compilation album Jukebox Dury two years later in 1981. The song has since appeared on every Dury compilation, as with "Hit Me with Your Rhythm Stick" before it.

Demon Records added "Reasons to Be Cheerful" as the sole bonus track to its CD re-issue of Laughter. This was an unusual choice, considering it has no relation to that album, which was recorded by another line-up of the band that included former Dr. Feelgood guitarist Wilko Johnson, and that the song had already been included as a bonus track on their re-issue of Do It Yourself.

Edsel Records included "Reasons to Be Cheerful" and the extended mix of the song on its two-disc edition of Do It Yourself.

== Versions ==
The 12" version of the single contained a longer remixed version of the track. This was later included as a bonus track for both the Demon and Edsel Records CD re-issues of the Do It Yourself album.

A live version of "Reasons to Be Cheerful" omitted from the original record was added as a bonus track to the CD re-issue of Ian Dury and the Blockheads' live album Warts 'n' Audience. It closed the band's set and featured Dury promising to make an album in the near future.

As the finale to Charlie Brooker's 2014 Wipe, the Blockheads played an adaptation called "Reasons to Be Fearful '14", with Brooker providing alternative lyrics relating to the events of 2014.

The song provides the title for the 2010 musical Reasons to Be Cheerful by the Graeae Theatre Company.

== Title ==
Similar to "Sex and Drugs and Rock and Roll", "Reasons to Be Cheerful" can be found spelt various ways, including on some official Ian Dury records. Variations included "Reasons to Be Cheerful Part 3", with no comma, "Reasons to Be Cheerful (Part 3)", "Reasons to Be Cheerful pt. 3", "Reasons to Be Cheerful (Pt. 3)", and simply "Reasons to Be Cheerful". The original single spells it "Reasons to Be Cheerful, Part 3" on the label of the 7" pressing, "Reasons to Be Cheerful, Pt. 3" on the label of the 12" but "Reasons to Be Cheerful (Part Three)" on the cover of both pressings.
