= Ian Dury =

British new wave singer (1942–2000)

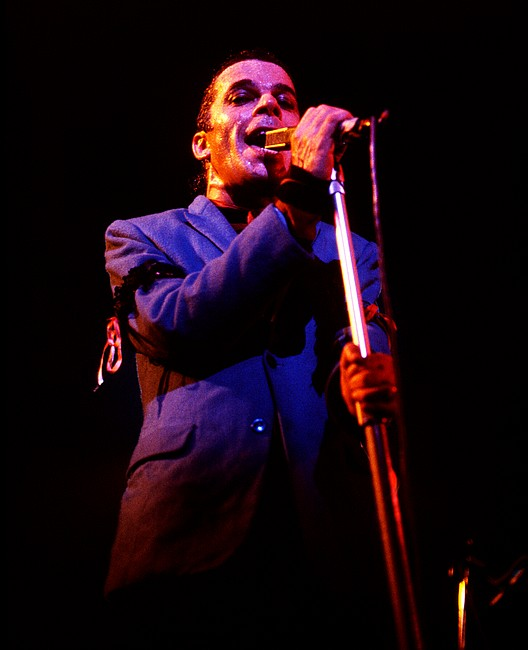
- Dury performing at the Roundhouse, London, in 1978

Background information
- Born: Ian Robins Dury; 12 May 1942; Harrow, Middlesex, England
- Died: 27 March 2000 (aged 57) Hampstead, London, England
- Education: Royal College Of Art (MA)
- Genres: New wave; punk rock; post-punk; funk; disco; pub rock
- Occupations: Singer; songwriter; actor
- Years active: 1970–2000
- Labels: Dawn; Stiff; Polydor; Demon; Ronnie Harris
- Formerly of: Kilburn and the High Roads; The Blockheads
- Spouse(s): Elizabeth Rathmell (m. 1967; div. 1985) Sophy Tilson (m. 1998)
- Website: iandury.co.uk

Ian Robins Dury (12 May 1942 – 27 March 2000) was an English singer, songwriter and actor best remembered as the frontman of Ian Dury and the Blockheads. Described by The Guardian as "one of few true originals of the English music scene", Dury drew from music hall and punk traditions, often incorporating observational humour and word play in his lyrics.

Dury initially performed with the pub rock band Kilburn and the High Roads before signing to the new wave-oriented independent record label Stiff in 1977. With the Blockheads, he scored several UK singles chart hits in the late 1970s, among them "What a Waste", "Reasons to Be Cheerful, Part 3" and the chart-topper "Hit Me with Your Rhythm Stick". In the 1980s, Dury initiated an acting career in film and television. His best-known later recordings include "Profoundly in Love with Pandora", written for the 1985 ITV series The Secret Diary of Adrian Mole, Aged 13¾, and the 1981 single "Spasticus Autisticus". The latter, a protest song reflecting Dury's life with polio and his opposition to contemporary attitudes about disability, was performed during the opening of the London 2012 Paralympics.

== Early life and education ==
Ian Dury was born at 43 Weald Rise in Harrow, at that time in Middlesex. His early years were spent in Harrow Weald (although it is often misreported that he was born in Upminster, Essex, an impression he often encouraged) and in Mevagissey, Cornwall, during the Blitz. His father, William George Dury (born 23 September 1905 in Southborough, Kent, died 25 February 1968 in Victoria, London), was a former boxer, coach and bus driver, and chauffeur for Rolls-Royce. His mother, Margaret "Peggy" Cuthbertson Walker (born 17 April 1910, Rochdale, Lancashire, died 20 December 1994 in Hampstead, London), was a health visitor, a doctor's daughter and the granddaughter of an East Donegal Ulster Protestant landowner. Bill and Peggy married in 1939 and set up home in Belsize Park, London.

Bill Dury was absent for work for long periods, so Peggy often took Ian to stay with her parents in Mevagissey. After the Second World War, the family moved briefly to Switzerland, where Ian's father was chauffeuring for a millionaire and the Western European Union. In 1946, Peggy brought Ian back to England and they relocated to Cranham, near Upminster in Essex, to live with Peggy's sisters. Although he saw his father on visits, they were never to live together again. At age seven, Dury contracted polio, most likely, he believed, at Westcliff Swimming Pool in Southend-on-Sea during the 1949 polio epidemic. After six weeks of isolation in the Royal Cornwall Infirmary, Truro, Ian was moved by ambulance back to Essex, to Black Notley Hospital in Braintree, where he spent eighteen months regaining his strength and mobility. Polio caused paralysis on the left-hand side of his body which led to a permanent disability.

Ian attended Chailey Heritage Craft School, East Sussex, from 1951 till 1954. Chailey was a hospital school for disabled children that had an ethos of toughening up its students, often by leaving the less physically able to find their own way up off the floor. Arguably, this harsh approach contributed to the tough and determined person Dury became. Chailey taught trades such as cobbling and printing, but Dury's mother wanted him to focus on academic studies, so Aunt Moll (Mary Walker), a Buckinghamshire Education Officer, arranged for him to attend the Royal Grammar School, High Wycombe. Ian found this school a challenge and recounted being punished for misdemeanours by being forced by prefects to learn long tracts of poetry until a housemaster found him sobbing and put a stop to it:

I had to go into a box room where the suitcases were stored and learn 80 lines of Ode to Autumn by yer man Keats. If I got a word wrong I had to go back, they added that to the end of the sentence and after five nights of this my head had definitely gone.

He left school at 16, having achieved GCE 'O' levels in English Language, English Literature and Art to study art and design at Walthamstow College of Art, where he met lifelong friend, pop artist and teacher Peter Blake. In 1963 Ian began an MA in painting at the Royal College of Art, graduating in 1966.

== Art career ==
In 1967 Dury took part in a group exhibition, "Fantasy and Figuration", alongside his soon-to-be wife Elizabeth Rathmell, Pat Douthwaite, Herbert Kitchen and Stass Paraskos at the Institute of Contemporary Arts in London.

Between 1966 and 1973 he was an art teacher at Luton College of Technology and at Canterbury College of Art. He also painted commercial illustrations for The Sunday Times in the early 1970s.

== Music career ==
=== Kilburn and the High Roads (1971–1975) ===
Dury formed Kilburn and the High Roads (a reference to the road in North West London) in 1971, and they played their first gig at Croydon School of Art on 5 December 1971. Dury was vocalist and lyricist, co-writing with pianist Russell Hardy and later enrolling into the group a number of the students he was teaching at Canterbury College of Art and Medway College of Design (now the University for the Creative Arts), including bassist Humphrey Ocean.

Managed first by Charlie Gillett and Gordon Nelki and latterly by fashion entrepreneur Tommy Roberts, the Kilburns were popular on London's pub rock circuit and signed to Dawn Records in 1974 but, despite favourable press coverage and a tour opening for rock band The Who, the group failed to rise above cult status and disbanded in 1975.

Kilburn and the High Roads recorded two albums, Handsome and Wotabunch!.

=== Going solo (August – September 1977) ===
The single "Sex & Drugs & Rock & Roll", released 26 August 1977, marked Dury's Stiff Records debut. Although it was banned by the BBC, it was named Single of the Week by NME on its release. The single issue was soon followed, at the end of September, by the album New Boots and Panties!! which achieved platinum status. "Sex & Drugs & Rock & Roll" was not listed on the album's track list, yet it was nonetheless present as track 1 on side 2 of some later 1977 pressings).

=== The Blockheads ===
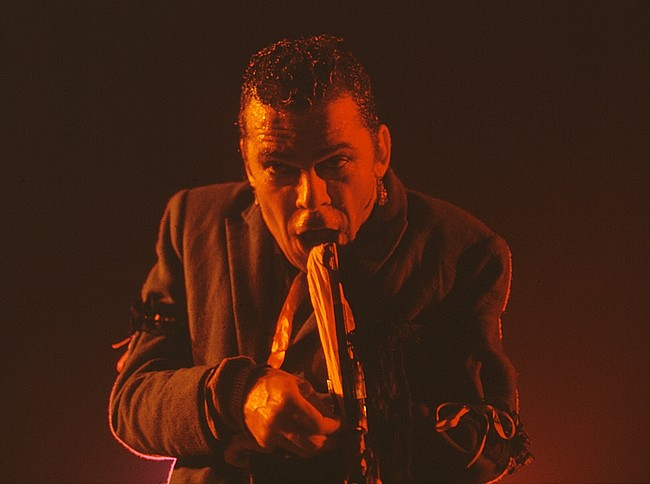
Live at The Roundhouse, Chalk Farm, London, 1978

Under the management of Andrew King and Peter Jenner, the original managers of Pink Floyd, Ian Dury and the Blockheads quickly gained a reputation as one of the top live acts of new wave music.

The Blockheads' sound drew from its members' diverse musical influences, which included jazz, rock and roll, funk, and reggae, and Dury's love of music hall. The band was formed after Dury began writing songs with pianist and guitarist Chaz Jankel (the brother of music video, TV, commercial and film director Annabel Jankel). Jankel took Dury's lyrics, fashioned a number of songs, and they began recording with members of Radio Caroline's Loving Awareness Band – drummer Charley Charles (born Hugh Glenn Mortimer Charles, Guyana 1945), bassist Norman Watt-Roy, keyboard player Mick Gallagher, guitarist John Turnbull and former Kilburns saxophonist Davey Payne.

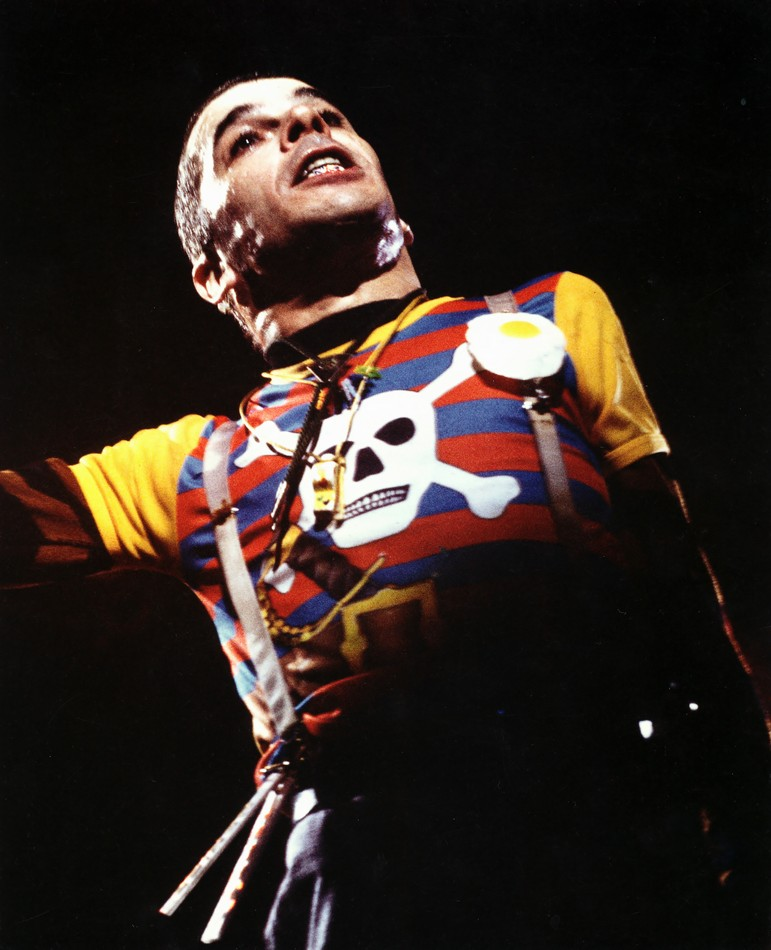
Live at The Roundhouse, Chalk Farm, London, 1978

In October 1977 Dury and his band started performing as Ian Dury and the Blockheads, when the band signed on for the Stiff "Live Stiffs Tour" alongside Elvis Costello & the Attractions, Nick Lowe, Wreckless Eric, and Larry Wallis. The tour was a success, and Stiff launched a concerted Ian Dury marketing campaign, resulting in the Top Ten hit "What a Waste" and the hit single "Hit Me with Your Rhythm Stick", which reached No. 1 in the UK at the beginning of 1979, selling just short of a million copies. Again, "Hit Me" was not included on the original release of the subsequent album Do It Yourself. With their hit singles, the band built up a dedicated following in the UK and other countries and their next single "Reasons to be Cheerful, Part 3" made number three in the UK. The band's second album Do It Yourself was released in June 1979 in a Barney Bubbles-designed sleeve of which there were over a dozen variations, all based on samples from the Crown wallpaper catalogue. Bubbles also designed the Blockhead logo.

Jankel left the band temporarily and relocated to the US after the release of "What a Waste" (his organ part on that single was overdubbed later) but he subsequently returned to the UK and began touring sporadically with the Blockheads, eventually returning to the group full-time for the recording of "Hit Me with Your Rhythm Stick"; according to Mickey Gallagher, the band recorded 28 takes of the song but eventually settled on the second take for the single release. Partly due to personality clashes with Dury, Jankel left the group again in 1980, after the recording of the Do It Yourself LP, and he returned to the US to concentrate on his solo career.

The group worked solidly over the 18 months between the release of "Rhythm Stick" and their next single, "Reasons to Be Cheerful, Part 3", which returned them to the charts, making the UK Top 10. Jankel was replaced by former Dr. Feelgood guitarist Wilko Johnson, who also contributed to the next album Laughter (1980) and its two hit singles, although Gallagher recalls that the recording of the Laughter album was difficult and that Dury was drinking heavily in this period.

In 1980–81 Dury and Jankel teamed up again with Sly and Robbie and the Compass Point All Stars to record Lord Upminster (1981). The Blockheads toured the UK and Europe throughout 1981, sometimes augmented by jazz trumpeter Don Cherry, ending the year with their only tour of Australia. The Blockheads disbanded in early 1982, after Dury secured a new recording deal with Polydor Records through A&R man Frank Neilson. Choosing to work with a group of young musicians which he named the Music Students, he recorded the album Four Thousand Weeks' Holiday. This album marked a departure from his usual style and was not as well received by fans for its American jazz influence.

The Blockheads briefly reformed in June 1987 to play a short tour of Japan, and then disbanded again. In September 1990, following the death from cancer of drummer Charley Charles, they reunited for two benefit concerts in aid of Charles' family, held at The Forum, Camden Town, with Steven Monti on drums. In December 1990, augmented by Merlin Rhys-Jones on guitar and Will Parnell on percussion, they recorded the live album Warts & Audience at the Brixton Academy.

The Blockheads (minus Jankel, who returned to California) toured Spain in January 1991, then disbanded again until August 1992 when, following Jankel's return to England, they were invited to reform for the Madstock! Festival in Finsbury Park; this was followed by sporadic gigs in Europe, Ireland, the UK and Japan in late 1994 and 1995. In the early 1990s, Dury appeared with English band Curve on the benefit compilation album Peace Together. Dury and Curve singer Toni Halliday shared vocals on a cover of the Blockheads' track "What a Waste".

In March 1996 Dury was diagnosed with cancer and, after recovering from an operation, he set about writing another album. In late 1996 he reunited with the Blockheads to record the album Mr. Love Pants (1998). Ian Dury and the Blockheads resumed touring, with Dylan Howe replacing Steven Monti on drums. Davey Payne left the group permanently in August and was replaced by Gilad Atzmon; this line-up gigged throughout 1999, culminating in their last performance with Ian Dury on 6 February 2000 at the London Palladium. Dury died six weeks later on 27 March 2000.

The Blockheads have continued after Dury's death, and continue to play live gigs as of 2023.

=== Other solo work ===
Dury continued to record other work without the Blockheads, including Lord Upminster (1981); Apples (1989) and The Bus Driver's Prayer & Other Stories (1992). He also released a single album with the Music Students, 4,000 Weeks' Holiday (1984). His 1981 song "Spasticus Autisticus" – written to show his disdain for that year's International Year of Disabled Persons, which he saw as patronising and counter-productive – was banned by the BBC from being broadcast by the BBC before 6 pm. The lyrics were uncompromising:

So place your hard-earned peanuts in my tin
And thank the Creator you're not in the state I'm in
So long have I been languished on the shelf
I must give all proceedings to myself

The song's refrain, "I'm spasticus, autisticus", was inspired by the response of the rebellious Roman gladiators in the film Spartacus, who, when instructed to identify their leader, all answered, "I am Spartacus", to protect him. According to George McKay, in his 2009 article "Crippled with nerves" (an early Dury song title), for Popular Music:

Ian Dury, that 'flaw of the jungle', produced a remarkable and sustained body of work that explored issues of disability, in both personal and social contexts, institutionalisation, and to a lesser extent the pop cultural tradition of disability. He also, with the single "Spasticus Autisticus" (1981), produced one of the outstanding protest songs about the place of disabled people in what he called 'normal land'.

Dury described the song as "a war cry" on Desert Island Discs. The song was used at the opening of the London 2012 Paralympics. In 1984, Dury was featured in the music video for the minor hit single "Walking in My Sleep" by Roger Daltrey of The Who.

== Musical influences and style ==
Dury's self-styling and chief musical influence was his hero since childhood, American rock and roll and rockabilly artist Gene Vincent. After hearing Vincent's hit single "Be-Bop-a-Lula" in the 1956 musical comedy film The Girl Can't Help It, he idolised him. Vincent also wore a leg brace, although Dury said he did not know this until later. Vincent is mentioned in one of Dury's earliest songs, "Upminster Kid" (on the 1975 Kilburn and the High Roads album Handsome), with the words "Well Gene Vincent Craddock remembered the love of an Upminster rock 'n' roll teen". Vincent had died four years earlier.

More well-known is the single "Sweet Gene Vincent" from his first solo album, New Boots and Panties!! in 1977. He wrote the lyrics after spending six weeks of research on Vincent, which included reading two biographies. His songwriting partner Chas Jankel had to trim it considerably, after Dury's original version, Jankel joked, "would have taken around 15 minutes to perform". The opening lyrics to the song were:

Blue Gene baby / Skinny white sailor, the chances were slender / The beauties were brief / Shall I mourn your decline with some Thunderbird wine / And a black handkerchief? / I miss your sad Virginia whisper / I miss the voice that called my heart.

Dury was a lover of music hall, another of his heroes being Max Wall. Dury developed a unique style that mixed music hall with punk and rock and roll, and crafted an on-stage persona that entertained his audiences.

Dury's lyrics are a combination of lyrical poetry, word play, observation of British everyday life, character sketches, and sexual humour: "This is what we find ... Home improvement expert Harold Hill of Harold Hill, Of do-it-yourself dexterity and double-glazing skill, Came home to find another gentleman's kippers in the grill, So he sanded off his winkle with his Black & Decker drill". The song "Billericay Dickie" rhymes "I had a love affair with Nina, In the back of my Cortina" with "A seasoned-up hyena Could not have been more obscener".

== Acting and other activities ==
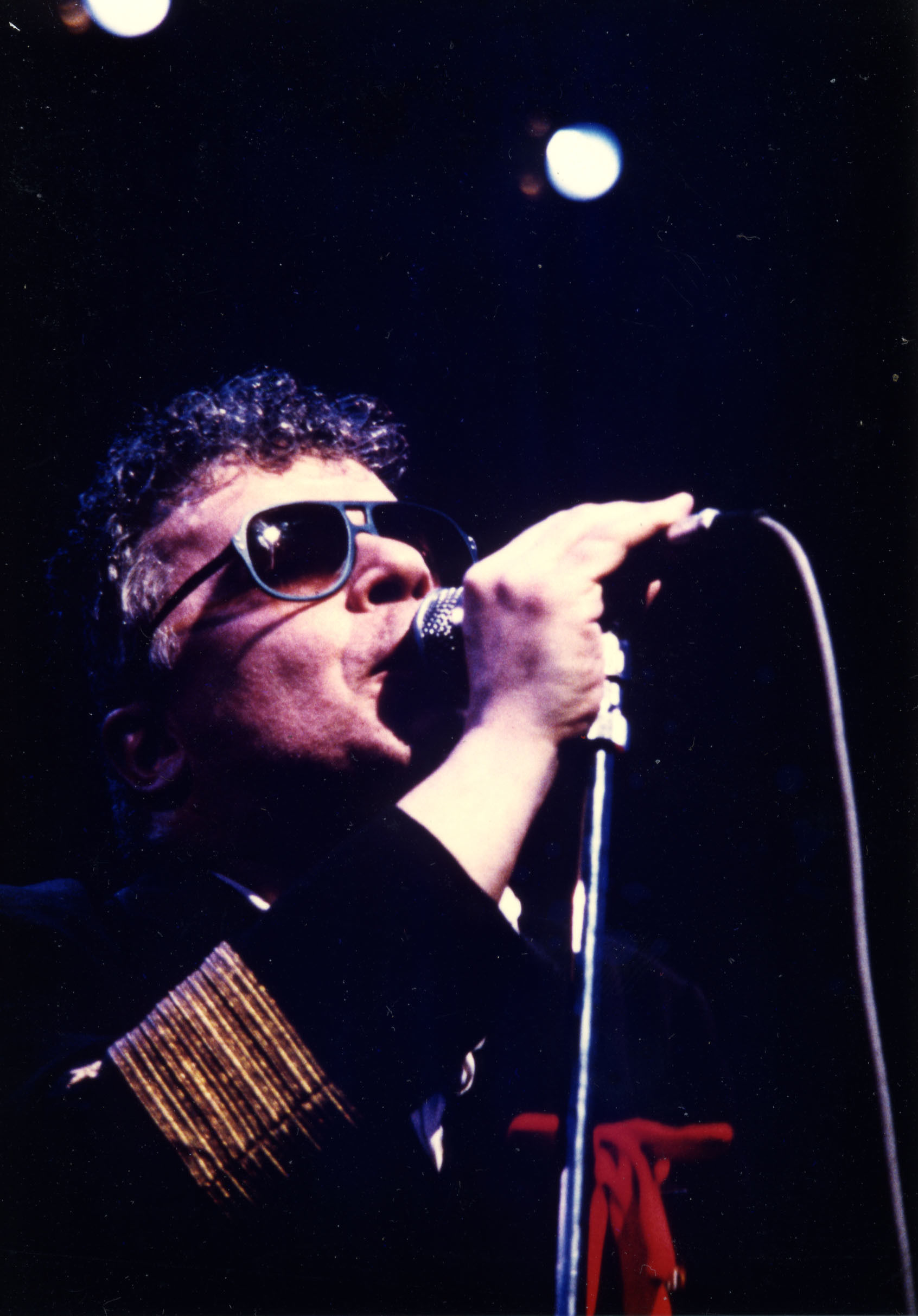
Dury in concert

Dury's confident and unusual demeanour caught the eyes of producers and directors of drama. His first important and extensive role was in Farrukh Dhondy's mini-series for the BBC King of the Ghetto (1986), a drama set in London's multi-racial Brick Lane area with a cast led by a young Tim Roth.

Dury had small parts in several films, probably the best known of which was Peter Greenaway's The Cook, the Thief, His Wife & Her Lover (1989), as well as a cameo appearance in Roman Polanski's Pirates (1986). He also appeared in the Eduardo Guedes film Rocinante (1986), the German comedy (lead) Brennende Betten (Burning Beds) (1988), Alejandro Jodorowsky's The Rainbow Thief (1990), and the Sylvester Stallone science fiction film Judge Dredd (1995). His other film appearances included roles in Number One (1985) starring Bob Geldof, the Bob Hoskins film The Raggedy Rawney (1988), and Split Second (1992) starring Rutger Hauer and Kim Cattrall. He also appeared alongside fellow lyricists Bob Dylan and Tom Waits, respectively, in the movies Hearts of Fire (1987) and Bearskin: An Urban Fairytale (1990), also by Eduardo Guedes. His later films included the comedy Different for Girls (1996), and The Crow: City of Angels (1996), directed by Tim Pope, who had directed a few of Dury's music videos.

Dury also wrote a musical, Apples, staged in London's Royal Court Theatre. In 1987 he appeared as the narrator (Scullery) in Road, also at the Royal Court. Among the cast was actress and singer Jane Horrocks, who cohabited with Dury until late in 1988, although the relationship was kept discreet.

Dury wrote and performed the theme song "Profoundly in Love with Pandora" for the television series The Secret Diary of Adrian Mole, Aged 13¾ (1985), based on the book of the same name by Sue Townsend, as well as its follow-up, The Growing Pains of Adrian Mole (1987). Dury turned down an offer from Andrew Lloyd Webber to write the libretto for Cats (from which Richard Stilgoe reportedly earned millions). The reason, said Dury, "I can't stand his music."

... I said no straight off. I hate Andrew Lloyd Webber. He's a wanker, isn't he? ... [E]very time I hear 'Don't Cry for Me Argentina' I feel sick, it's so bad. He got Richard Stilgoe to do the lyrics in the end, who's not as good as me. He made millions out of it. He's crap, but he did ask the top man first!

When HIV/AIDS first came to prominence in the mid-1980s, Dury was among celebrities who appeared on UK television to promote safe sex, demonstrating how to put on a condom using a model of an erect penis. In the 1990s, he became an ambassador for UNICEF, recruiting stars such as Robbie Williams to publicise the cause. The two visited Sri Lanka in this capacity to promote polio vaccination. Dury appeared with Curve on the Peace Together concert and CD (1993), performing "What a Waste", with benefits to the Youth of Northern Ireland. He also supported the charity Cancer BACUP.

Dury appeared in the Classic Albums episode that focused on Steely Dan's album Aja. Dury commented that the album was one of the most "upful" he had ever heard, and that the album "lifted [his] spirits up" whenever he played it.

Dury also appeared at the end of the Carter USM track "Skywest & Crooked" narrating from the musical Man of La Mancha.

== Illness and death ==
Dury was diagnosed with colorectal cancer in 1996 and underwent surgery, but tumours were later found in his liver, and he was told that his condition was terminal. In 1998, his death was incorrectly announced on XFM radio by Bob Geldof, possibly due to hoax information from a listener. In 1999, Dury collaborated with Madness on their first original album in fourteen years on the track "Drip Fed Fred". It was one of his last recordings, though he also performed again with the Blockheads in mid-1999 at Ronnie Scott's in Soho. This was a special performance recorded for LWT's South Bank Show and the audience were invited fans and friends of the band and crew. His deteriorating condition was evident and he had to take rests between takes and be helped on and off stage.

Ian Dury and the Blockheads' last public performance was a charity concert in aid of Cancer BACUP on 6 February 2000 at the London Palladium, supported by Kirsty MacColl and Phill Jupitus. Dury was noticeably ill and again had to be helped on and off stage. Dury died of metastatic colorectal cancer on 27 March 2000, aged 57, in Hampstead, London. He was cremated after a humanist funeral at Golders Green Crematorium with 250 mourners at the service, including fellow musicians Suggs and Jools Holland as well as Member of Parliament Mo Mowlam. An obituary in The Guardian called him "one of few true originals of the English music scene". Suggs, the lead singer of Madness, called him "possibly the finest lyricist we've seen". The Ian Dury website opened an online book of condolence shortly after his death, which was signed by hundreds of fans.

== Legacy ==
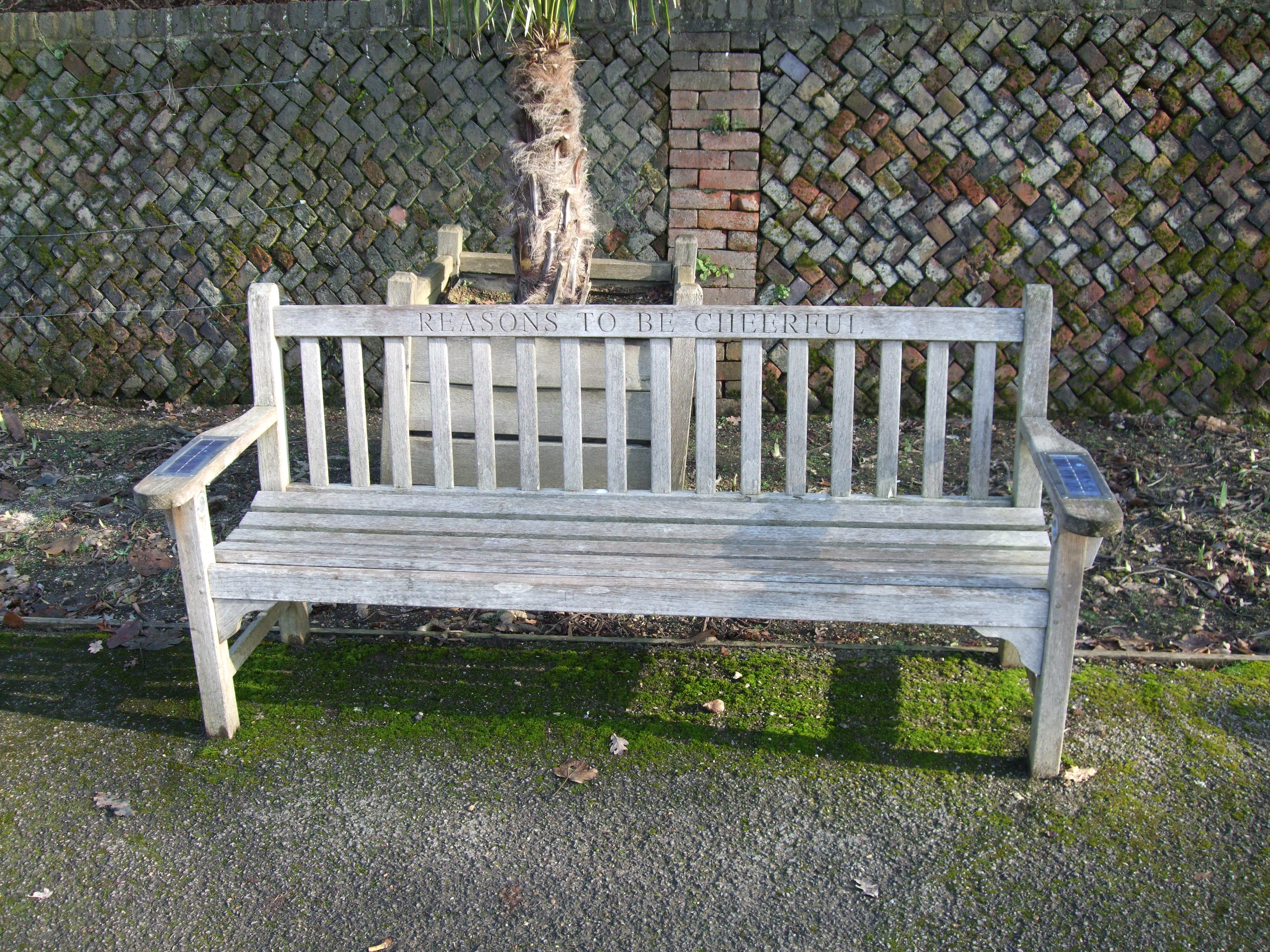
Ian Dury memorial bench in Richmond Park, southwest London

Dury's son, Baxter Dury, is also a singer. He sang a few of his father's songs in 2000 at the wake after the funeral. Since 2002, he has released nine of his own albums, including It's a Pleasure (2014), Prince of Tears (2017) and The Night Chancers (2020).

In 2002, Dury's daughter Jemima Dury organised a "musical bench" designed by Mil Stricevic to be placed in a favourite viewing spot of Dury's near Poets' Corner, in the gardens of Pembroke Lodge, in Richmond Park, south-west London. The back of the bench is inscribed with the words "Reasons to Be Cheerful", the title of one of Dury's songs. The QR codes on the arms of the bench allow visitors to listen to a track listing of his songs on one side and his appearance on Desert Island Discs on the other.

In 1999 the autobiographical documentary On My Life, directed by Mike Connolly, was released. The film, in which Dury recalls his life and career, intercut with concert footage, includes contributions from painter Peter Blake, Jemima and Baxter Dury, and members of the Blockheads. The programme was first broadcast in 1999, then again in August 2009 and March 2025 on BBC Four.

Between 6 January and 14 February 2009 a musical about his life, entitled Hit Me! The Life & Rhymes of Ian Dury, was premiered and ran at the Leicester Square Theatre in London.

A biopic titled Sex & Drugs & Rock & Roll starring Andy Serkis as Dury was released on 8 January 2010, and was nominated for several awards. Ray Winstone and Naomie Harris also appeared. The title of the film is derived from Dury's 1977 7" single "Sex & Drugs & Rock & Roll". Also in 2010 music journalist Will Birch published Ian Dury: The Definitive Biography which was well received.

A musical, Reasons to be Cheerful, was produced by the Graeae Theatre Company in association with Theatre Royal Stratford East and New Wolsey Theatre. Set in 1979 the musical featured Dury classics in a "riotous coming-of-age tale". The 2010 production was supported by the Blockheads, while Sir Peter Blake donated a limited edition print of the "Reasons to be Cheerful" artwork.

Interviewed by the Evening Standard in 2010, son Baxter said his father "was like a "Polaris missile"... "He would seek out someone's weakness in seconds, and then lock onto it. That's how he controlled his environment. It was very funny, in a gruesome kind of way ... if it wasn't you he was picking on. But it was a strange obsession, too. Like, why do you want to be like that? He was never really physically violent – he was a small disabled guy – but there was a lot of mental violence."

Speaking to BBC Radio 2 in February 2021, English pop star Robbie Williams cited Dury as his biggest inspiration as a lyricist. Williams sings on the final track of the posthumously released album Ten More Turnips from the Tip.

== Personal life ==
Dury married Elizabeth "Betty" Rathmell on 3 June 1967 in Barnstaple, Devon, and they had two children, Jemima (born 1969) and Baxter (born 1971). In 1973 Dury left the family, who were living at the time in a Buckinghamshire village, and moved back to London to pursue his music career.

He lived with his partner Denise Roudette for six years after he moved back to London, renting 40 Oval Mansions in Kennington, which The Guardian referred to as "one of London's most notorious squatted buildings" and Dury himself dubbed "Catshit Mansions".

Dury and Rathmell divorced in 1985 but remained close. Starting in 1986 he had a year-long relationship with actress Jane Horrocks, whom he met while they both performed in Jim Cartright's play Road, and they remained friends until his death.

Dury married sculptor Sophy Tilson in 1998, with whom he had two children, Bill and Albert. Both have musical projects based in London—Rifle and Bill Dury and the Healers.

== Discography ==
Studio albums

- Handsome (1975, with Kilburn and the High-Roads)
- New Boots and Panties!! (1977, solo)
- Do It Yourself (1979, with the Blockheads)
- Laughter (1980, with the Blockheads)
- Lord Upminster (1981, solo)
- 4,000 Weeks' Holiday (1984, with the Music Students)
- Apples (1989, solo)
- The Bus Driver's Prayer & Other Stories (1992, solo)
- Mr. Love Pants (1998, with the Blockheads)
- Ten More Turnips from the Tip (2002, with the Blockheads)

== Acting credits ==
Year	Title	Role	Notes
1981	Fundamental Frolics	Himself	
1984	Deus Ex Machina	The Fertiliser	Video game, Voice
1985	Number One	Teddy Bryant	TV movie
1986	Pirates	Meat Hook	
1986	King of the Ghetto	Sammy	4 episodes
1986	Rocinante	Jester	
1987	O Paradeisos anoigei me antikleidi	Acrobat	
1987	Hearts of Fire	Bones	
1988	The Raggedy Rawney	Weazel	
1988	Brennende Betten	Harry Winfield	Shot in Germany
1989	The Voice	Kowalski	
1989	The Cook, the Thief, His Wife & Her Lover	Terry Fitch	
1989	Bearskin: An Urban Fairytale	Charlie	
1990	The Rainbow Thief	Bartender	
1990	After Midnight	Harry	
1992	Split Second	Jay Jay	
1994	Screen Two	Rendle	Episode: "Skallagrigg"
1995	Judge Dredd	Geiger	
1996	Different for Girls	Recovery Agent	
1996	The Crow: City of Angels	Noah	
1998	Underground	Rat's Dad	
1998	Middleton's Changeling	De Flores	Final film role
