= Sweet Gene Vincent =

Single by Ian Dury

from the album New Boots and Panties!!
- B-side: "You're More Than Fair"
- Released: 27 November 1977 (U.K.)
- Recorded: 1976
- Genre: Punk rock; rock and roll
- Length: 3:41
- Label: Stiff Records
- Songwriters: Ian Dury; Chas Jankel
- Producers: 'Nobody'; Pete Jenner

Ian Dury singles chronology
"Sex and Drugs and Rock and Roll" (1977)	"Sweet Gene Vincent" (1977)	"What a Waste" (1978)

Official audio
- "Sweet Gene Vincent" on YouTube

"Sweet Gene Vincent" is a song and single by Ian Dury. Taken from his first solo album New Boots and Panties!! it was his second solo single and third solo release and is a tribute to Rock 'n' Roll singer Gene Vincent. It was released November 1977 on the single BUY 23 Sweet Gene Vincent / You're More Than Fair and there was no picture sleeve released.

"Sweet Gene Vincent" remained in Ian Dury's set list for almost his entire career, even after other faster paced songs like "Plaistow Patricia" and "Blackmail Man" had been dropped because of the singer's worsening health and was played at his final concert at the London Palladium in February 2000. As of 2007, the Blockheads continue to use the song in their sets.

== Ian Dury and Gene Vincent ==
Ian Dury was a fan of Gene Vincent since his early to mid teens and claims to have bought every single Vincent produced. In an interview reprinted in Sex And Drugs And Rock And Roll: The Life of Ian Dury, Dury says that he first heard of Vincent via "Be-Bop-A-Lula"'s inclusion in film The Girl Can't Help It and admitted to being reduced to tears by the single as an adolescent. For his whole career Dury would talk very sentimentally, sometimes poetically about Gene Vincent.

It was Vincent's death in 1971 that was a major prompt for Dury to make Kilburn and the High Roads a serious endeavour and his stage clothes of the time often reflected Vincent's influence, notably black leather gloves. He also namechecked the singer in one of his earliest original songs "Upminster Kid", albeit under the singer's 'full' name Gene Vincent Craddock.

Curiously, Dury constantly denied that identification with the singer, also crippled and forced to wear a leg brace, was in any way an attraction. He apparently hadn't even known Vincent was crippled when he first became a fan. What drew Dury's attention to the singer was his voice and his look.

Dury chose Vincent's first single, "Woman Love", as one of his eight songs when he appeared on BBC Radio 4's Desert Island Discs show.

== Lyrics ==
Ian Dury spent six weeks researching his lyric and read two biographies of Gene Vincent before finishing it and handing it to the song's co-writer, Chas Jankel. Had it been kept in its original draft, Jankel jokes, it would have taken 15 minutes to sing.

Dury's research and knowledge allowed a large percentage of the lyric, which tells the rough life-story of Vincent, to be made up of references and/or extracts from Vincent's songs. For instance the Song's opening line Blue Gene Baby is a faithful re-creation of the first line of "Blue Jean Bop" and the line Who, who, who slapped John? spoken as the song speeds up to its full tempo is directly lifted from "Who Slapped John". Another line 'and you lay that pistol down' is a bastardisation of a lyric from "Pistol Packin' Mama" used to reference Vincent's partiality for waving guns around in-studio (an act that once scared The Beatles). "Be-Bop-A-Lula" is also referenced at least once, as one character in the song "Uncanny Annie" is 'the one with the flying feet', 'she's the one with the flying feet' being a line in "Be-Bop-A-Lula".

Referencing Dury's interest in Vincent's look, the song contains two sections solely focussing on Vincent's typical black and white dress. Dury would constantly forget the second set Black gloves, white frost, black crepe, white lead, white sheet, black knight, jet black, dead white when singing "Sweet Gene Vincent" live and replace them often with totally different lyrics.

Suggs, the lead singer of Madness and a fan of Dury, included several references to the lyrics of "Sweet Gene Vincent" in his tribute song to Ian Dury, "Oranges and Lemons", which he recorded with Jools Holland and his Rhythm and Blues Orchestra for the Small World, Big Band Volume 1 album. Suggs also quoted the song's lyrics in his introduction for re-runs of On My Life, a documentary about Ian Dury.

== B-side ==
The song's B-side, "You're More Than Fair", was written some years before its eventual release while Ian Dury was a member of his pub-rock band Kilburn & The Highroads where it was a live favourite and was frequently in their set. As of 2008, it still appears in The Blockheads’ set.

The song features Ian Dury singing in a mock-Jamaican accent (such as, for instance, the Kinks' "Apeman") to a reggae tune and tells the amusing story of a couple having sex as they move through the house, with foreplay beginning in the hall and the song ending with the male's ejaculation on the roof. Its lyrics are still noteworthy even by modern standards where songs are much more sexually explicit because of its unusual use of the word 'clitoris'.

Earlier versions of the song, recorded with Kilburn & The Highroads feature different lyrics that do not keep up the 'sexual act in a location in the home' theme and replace 'clitoris' with the more crude term 'fanny' (in Britain fanny is used to mean the vagina, rather than the backside as it is in America).

== Reception ==
"Sweet Gene Vincent" was ranked at No. 13 among the top "Tracks of the Year" for 1977 by NME, with New Boots and Panties!! ranked at No. 2 among the year's top albums.

== Re-releases ==
"Sweet Gene Vincent" was the only single to be released from New Boots and Panties!! (although the album's opening track "Wake Up And Make Love With Me" was included on the "What A Waste" single) and was previously available as the album's second track, and is still included on its CD-reissues. It has constantly featured on Ian Dury compilations since including his first, Jukebox Dury.

== Versions ==
A live version of the song can be found on Dury's Warts 'N' Audience album, it is preceded by a short introduction by Dury in the form of him singing another song and Dury shouting 'Oi oi! to the crowd. It features a totally different verse replacing the second set of 'black/white' lyrics and Wilko Johnson on guitar. Another version has been released, recorded live after Ian Dury's death appears on The Blockhead's first release without their former lead singer Straight From The Desk - 2. Another live performance at the Hammersmith Odeon, featuring Mick Jones of the Clash on guitar, was part of the Concert For Kampuchea, on 27 December 1979; Dury teasingly tells Jones "Listen, we got four chords in this song, Michael."

Robbie Williams sings the song on Brand New Boots and Panties, a re-creation of New Boots and Panties!! with various other lead singers that acted as a tribute album to Ian Dury. Williams and Dury met while working for UNICEF and Williams adds an additional repetition of the song's title near his version's close; Dury often did this live.

The backing track to Sweet Gene Vincent (that is, an instrumental version) has recently been released on Edsel Records' 2-Disc re-issue of New Boots and Panties!!.

The bit before the first chorus is sung by Andy Serkis in the ending of the Ian Dury biography film Sex & Drugs & Rock & Roll.

The song is also featured on the soundtrack of the Christopher Petit film Radio On.
