= Norman Watt-Roy =

English musician (born 1951)

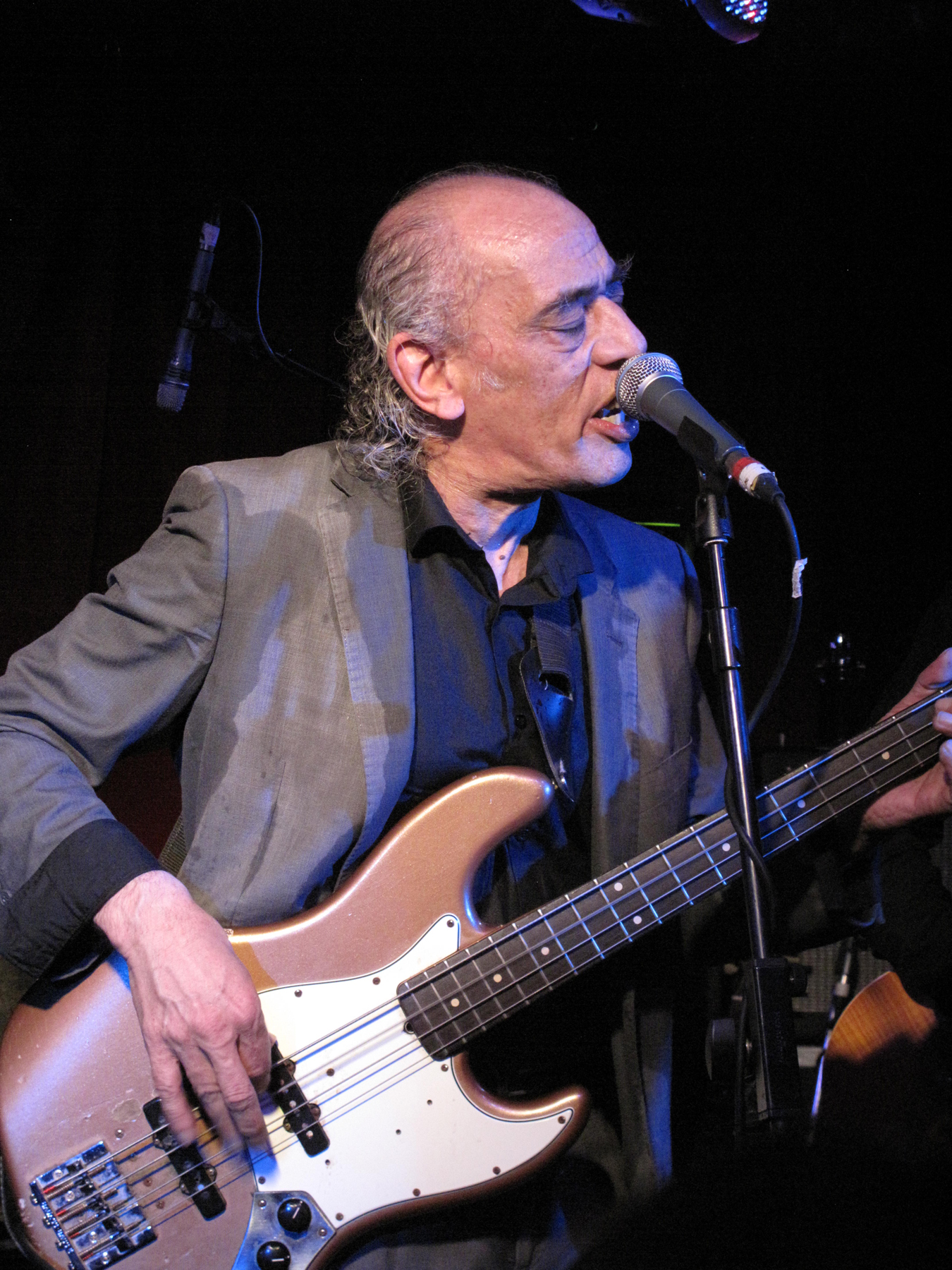
- Watt-Roy performing at The Water Rats, 2011

Background information
- Born: Norman Joseph Watt-Roy; 15 February 1951 (age 75); Bombay, India (now Mumbai)
- Origin: Harlow, Essex, England
- Genres: Post-punk; new wave; funk; progressive rock; disco; jazz
- Occupations: Musician; arranger; composer
- Instruments: Bass guitar; vocals
- Years active: 1967–present
- Label: Stiff

Norman Joseph Watt-Roy (born 15 February 1951) is an English musician, arranger and composer.

Watt-Roy's music career spans more than 40 years. He came to prominence in the late 1970s, during the punk and new wave era of rock music as the bass player for Ian Dury and the Blockheads. He had previously been a member of the Greatest Show on Earth.

In addition to his work with the Blockheads, Watt-Roy has been a session musician and has released one solo album.

== Early life ==
Norman Joseph Watt-Roy was born into an Anglo-Indian family on 15 February 1951, in Bombay, India. In November 1954, the Watt-Roy family, including Norman, his older brother Garth Watt-Roy (born Garth Philip Watt-Roy, December 1947, Bombay, India), and his sister moved to England. They settled in Highbury, North London, where Norman went to St. Joan of Arc Primary School, Blackstock Road. When Norman was 8, the family moved to Harlow, Essex. At the age of 8, he learned a few guitar chords from his father, and played in high school bands with his older brother Garth, who started playing the lead guitar in 1961. Norman left high school at the age of 15, and briefly studied art at Harlow Technical College, and then moved back to London.

== Early band work ==
In early 1967, Norman Watt-Roy formed the band the Living Daylights with his brother Garth and released a single on the Philips label titled "Let's Live for Today" (April 1967) and did regular gigs in venues such as the Angel Blues Rooms in Edmonton, London. In 1968 Norman and Garth Watt-Roy formed a nine-piece soul band and toured U.S. military bases in Germany, backing American soul singers such as Sonny Burke and played a summer residency at the Maddocks Club in Spain.

By this time the band was known as the Greatest Show on Earth and by 1969 had won a recording contract with Harvest. This led to the release, in February 1970, of the single "Real Cool World", which was a hit in Europe, reaching number-one in Switzerland. The band's debut album Horizons was followed by a second album The Going's Easy, both issued in 1970 and another single "Tell the Story". In 1970 Garth joined the progressive rock / hard rock band Fuzzy Duck.

== Pre-Blockheads ==
In 1972, Watt-Roy joined the band Glencoe, and met guitarist John Turnbull. The quartet released two albums, Glencoe, and The Spirit of Glencoe, along with three singles, and four recorded John Peel radio sessions before breaking up, and in 1974 they got together with keyboardist Mick Gallagher to form the nucleus of a band which, with the addition of drummer Charlie Charles, would become Loving Awareness (managed by Radio Caroline guru Ronan O'Rahilly). It was during a session with Charles for a friend in 1976 that they met both Ian Dury and Chaz Jankel and went on to play on the album New Boots and Panties!!, which was released in 1977 on the Stiff label.

== Ian Dury and the Blockheads ==
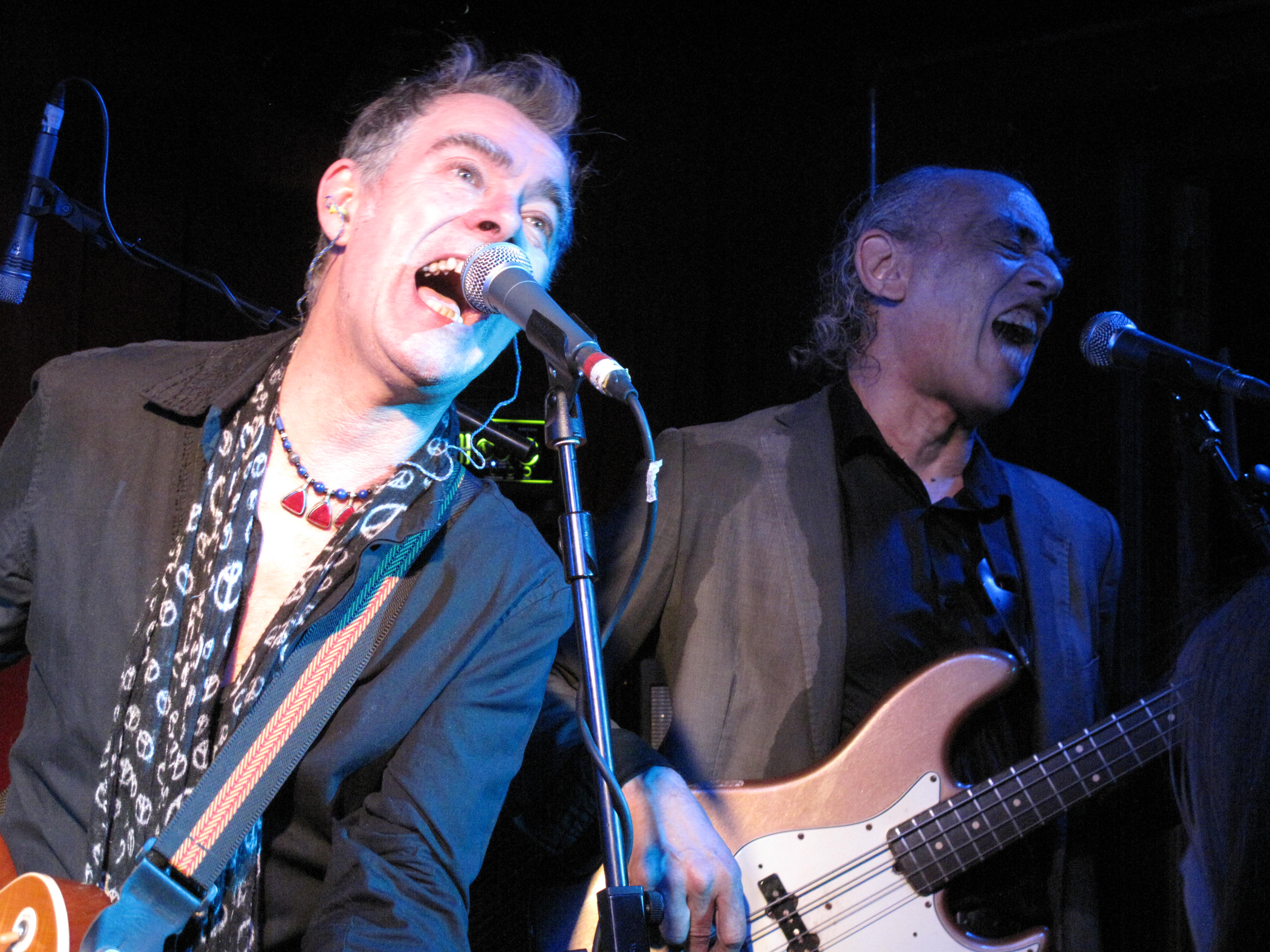
John Turnbull and Watt-Roy performing live at The Water Rats, 2011

The Loving Awareness quartet were later to join up with Dury and Jankel for the first Stiff Tour of UK and became known as Ian Dury and the Blockheads. Under the management of Andrew King and Peter Jenner, the original managers of Pink Floyd, Ian Dury and the Blockheads quickly gained a reputation as one of the top live acts of new wave music. They released two more albums on Stiff and several singles, achieving a UK number one in 1979 with "Hit Me with Your Rhythm Stick".

In 1980, Wilko Johnson replaced Jankel for a while, which led to a rapport between Johnson and Watt-Roy. This resulted in Watt-Roy becoming a regular member of Johnson's own band by 1985.

== Other work ==
During the 1970s and 1980s, Watt-Roy did session work, appearing on albums such as Nick Lowe's Jesus of Cool, Rachel Sweet's Fool Around and Jona Lewie's single "You'll Always Find Me in the Kitchen at Parties". He also made an appearance on the Selecter's 1981 album Celebrate the Bullet and played on the Clash's Sandinista! album along with fellow Blockhead Mick Gallagher on keyboards. Watt-Roy performed on the Sandinista! tracks recorded at Electric Lady Studios in New York City, including "The Magnificent Seven", "Hitsville UK", and others. Watt-Roy also played bass on their Cut the Crap recordings.

In 1983, Watt-Roy provided basslines for the Frankie Goes to Hollywood single "Relax" during a session which included Blockheads John Turnbull, Mick Gallagher and Charlie Charles. This version however, was not used for the final release of the song. In 1984, he teamed up with Gallagher again for Wreckless Eric's Captains of Industry's 1985 album A Roomful of Monkeys.

In 1984, he provided bass on all tracks to the Who's Roger Daltrey's solo album, Parting Should Be Painless. The album had one minor hit single, "Walking in My Sleep", which featured Watt-Roy and Ian Dury in its music video.

In 2001, Watt-Roy completed sessions with members of Madness and also joined them sporadically for live work. He also worked with the ex-producer of Depeche Mode, who had recorded him jamming with drummer Steve Monti meaning to sample the results. Since then, he has found work with Nick Cave on Cave's solo shows, without the Bad Seeds, and continued as bass player for Wilko Johnson.

Watt-Roy guested on Viv Albertine's The Vermillion Border on Cadiz Music in 2012. In 2013 he released a solo album, Faith & Grace, also on Cadiz, with guests including former Blockheads drummer Dylan Howe.

Since 2024, Watt-Roy has been making regular live appearances with Welsh guitarist James Oliver.

On 10 September 2026, he performed the entire album Blues Breakers with Eric Clapton by John Mayall (popularly known as the Beano Album), with Sonny Flint's Beano Bluesbreakers. The band was formed by drummer Sonny Flint (son of original Blues Breakers drummer Hughie Flint) and featuring guitarist Lee Harris of Nick Mason's Saucerful of Secrets and vocalist Laine Hines (son of Denny Laine), alongside a selection of guest musicians.

== Discography ==
=== The Greatest Show on Earth ===
- Horizons (1970)
- The Going's Easy (1970)
- The Greatest Show on Earth (1975)

=== The Blockheads ===
- New Boots and Panties!! (1977)
- Do It Yourself (1979)
- Laughter (1980)
- Live! Warts 'n' Audience (1990)
- The Bus Driver's Prayer and other Stories (1994)
- Mr. Love Pants (1998)
- Straight from the Desk (2001)
- Ten More Turnips from the Tip (2002)
- Where's the Party? (2004)
- 30 – Live at The Electric Ballroom (2008)
- Staring Down the Barrel (2009)
- Same Horse Different Jockey (2013)
- Beyond the Call of Dury (2017)
