= Sex & Drugs & Rock & Roll =

Single by Ian Dury
- B-side: "Razzle in My Pocket"/"Close to Home"
- Released: 26 August 1977 (UK)
- Recorded: 1976
- Genre: Punk-funk; new wave
- Length: 3:14
- Label: Stiff
- Songwriters: Ian Dury, Chaz Jankel
- Producer: "Nobody"

Ian Dury singles chronology
"Crippled with Nerves" (1974)	"Sex & Drugs & Rock & Roll" (1977)	"Sweet Gene Vincent" (1977)

Official audio
- "Sex & Drugs & Rock & Roll" on YouTube

"Sex & Drugs & Rock & Roll" is a song and single by the English singer Ian Dury. It was originally released as a Stiff Records single on 26 August 1977. The song was released under the single name "Ian Dury", but three members of the Blockheads appear on the record – the song's co-writer and guitarist Chaz Jankel, Norman Watt-Roy on bass and drummer Charlie Charles. The B-side was "Razzle in My Pocket", a song about shoplifting pornographic magazines in Romford.

== History ==
The song was written by Ian Dury and Chaz Jankel in Dury's flat in Oval Mansions, London (nicknamed "Catshit mansions" by Dury) that overlooked The Oval cricket ground. The pattern of work adopted by the pair involved Dury presenting Jankel with his hand-typed lyric sheets. According to Jankel in Sex and Drugs and Rock and Roll: The Life of Ian Dury he would be repeatedly given the lyric for "Sex and Drugs and Rock and Roll" but Jankel kept rejecting the song, only for it to be at the top of the pile again the next time, only to be rejected again. This went on until Dury sang the song's guitar riff to Jankel and sang the song's title in time with Jankel's riff.

Later, Jankel heard the Ornette Coleman tune "Ramblin'" (from his 1959 album Change of the Century, which included also Charlie Haden and Don Cherry) and heard exactly the same bass riff being played by Haden. Dury once apologised to Coleman for lifting the riff but, as Coleman explained, he (or possibly Haden) had lifted it himself from a Kentucky folk tune called "Old Joe Clark". An alternative version to this story exists: as Dury explained when he guested on BBC Radio 4's Desert Island Discs, he had apologised at Ronnie Scott's Club for the riff lift to Haden, who responded by saying there was no need for an apology as he had lifted it from an old Cajun tune.

The single did not chart, selling around 19,000 copies (a small amount for a single in 1977) but won critical acclaim. The original single was deleted after only two months. "That was the company's policy at the time: to go for fast sales on every single and then to delete it", Jankel recalled. "So we didn't get much chance to climb up the main chart."

Released as it was in the height of the popularity of punk rock, the song was misinterpreted (as it often is to this day) as a song about excess as its title and chorus would suggest. Although the single was banned by the BBC, a number of Radio 1 disc jockeys, including Annie Nightingale and John Peel, continued to promote the record, also playing the B-side. Dury himself, however, maintained that the song was not a punk anthem and said he was trying to suggest that there was more to life than a 9-to-5 existence (such as in his track-by-track comments in the sleeve-notes of Repertoire Records' Reasons to Be Cheerful: The Best of Ian Dury & the Blockheads compilation). The verses themselves are at times somewhat riddle-like, although always suggestive of an alternative lifestyle:

Here's a little bit of advice, you're quite welcome, it is free
Don't do nothing that is cut-price, you'll know what they'll make you be
They will try their tricky device, trap you with the ordinary
Get your teeth into a small slice, the cake of liberty

Although the song made the phrase "Sex & Drugs & Rock & Roll" more popular, it has been around at least since the late 1960s and early 1970s.

=== Re-releases ===
The song has become a staple on punk rock, new wave and Ian Dury compilations but initially the song was not available in the abundance it is today. In keeping with Dury's own policy of not including his singles on his albums, the track was not officially included on his debut album New Boots and Panties!!, though a 12-inch version of the single was released in France in November 1977, with both tracks from his next single "Sweet Gene Vincent"/"You're More Than Fair" replacing "Razzle in My Pocket" as the B-side, and again in December as a free giveaway to guests at the NME's Christmas party that year (of which only 1,000 were pressed). This time "Razzle in My Pocket" was replaced by "England's Glory" and "Two Steep Hills", two tracks recorded live by Ian Dury & The Kilburns, the final phase of Dury's pub-rock band Kilburn & The Highroads. Five hundred more copies of the NME's version of the single were re-pressed for a competition the magazine ran but following this it was not available until Juke Box Dury, an Ian Dury singles collection released in 1981 by Stiff Records. Since then it has appeared on every Ian Dury compilation.

=== Versions ===
Stiff Records organised a joint tour for Nick Lowe, Ian Dury, Wreckless Eric, Larry Wallis, and Elvis Costello, five of their biggest acts at the time, with the intention of having the bands alternating as the headlining act. Ian Dury and the newly formed Blockheads soon became the stars of the tour (it was surmised that Elvis Costello would be the main attraction, having had chart success) and the nightly encore became "Sex & Drugs & Rock & Roll". A version can be heard on the Live Stiffs Live (1978) compilation live LP released after the tour called "Sex & Drugs & Rock & Roll & Chaos", credited to Ian Dury and Stiff Stars. It features four drummers and four keyboard players, plus vocals by Wallis, Wreckless Eric, Edmunds, Lowe, and Dury, and by the end (at 5 minutes and 22 seconds).

Another live version can be found on the Ian Dury & the Blockheads live album Straight from the Desk (2001), though much of it is not the song but Ian Dury introducing the band and their respective solos, with only the first half of the song and a repetition of the title at the song's climax included.

When the track was re-released the New Boots and Panties!! (1977) album on the bonus disc. It features two later Blockheads members, Norman Watt-Roy and Charley Charles.

== Allusions ==
Variations of the phrase are often used in media:

- The 2005 book Sex, Drugs, Einstein & Elves by Clifford A. Pickover
- The 2003 book Sex, Drugs, and Cocoa Puffs by Chuck Klosterman
- The 1999 novel Sex and Drugs and Sausage Rolls by Robert Rankin
- The 1991 film Sex, Drugs, Rock & Roll featuring Eric Bogosian.
- The podcast The SDR Show starring Big Jay Oakerson

The opening lines of the song are sung in the introduction to the 1990 "Ain't No Right" by Jane's Addiction

== Other sources ==
- Sex and Drugs and Rock and Roll: The Life of Ian Dury by Richard Balls, first published 2000, Omnibus Press
- Ian Dury & The Blockheads: Song by Song by Jim Drury, first published 2003, Sanctuary Publishing.
- Reasons to Be Cheerful 2-Disc Compilation first released 1996, Repertoire Records
