= Davey Payne =

English saxophonist (born 1944)

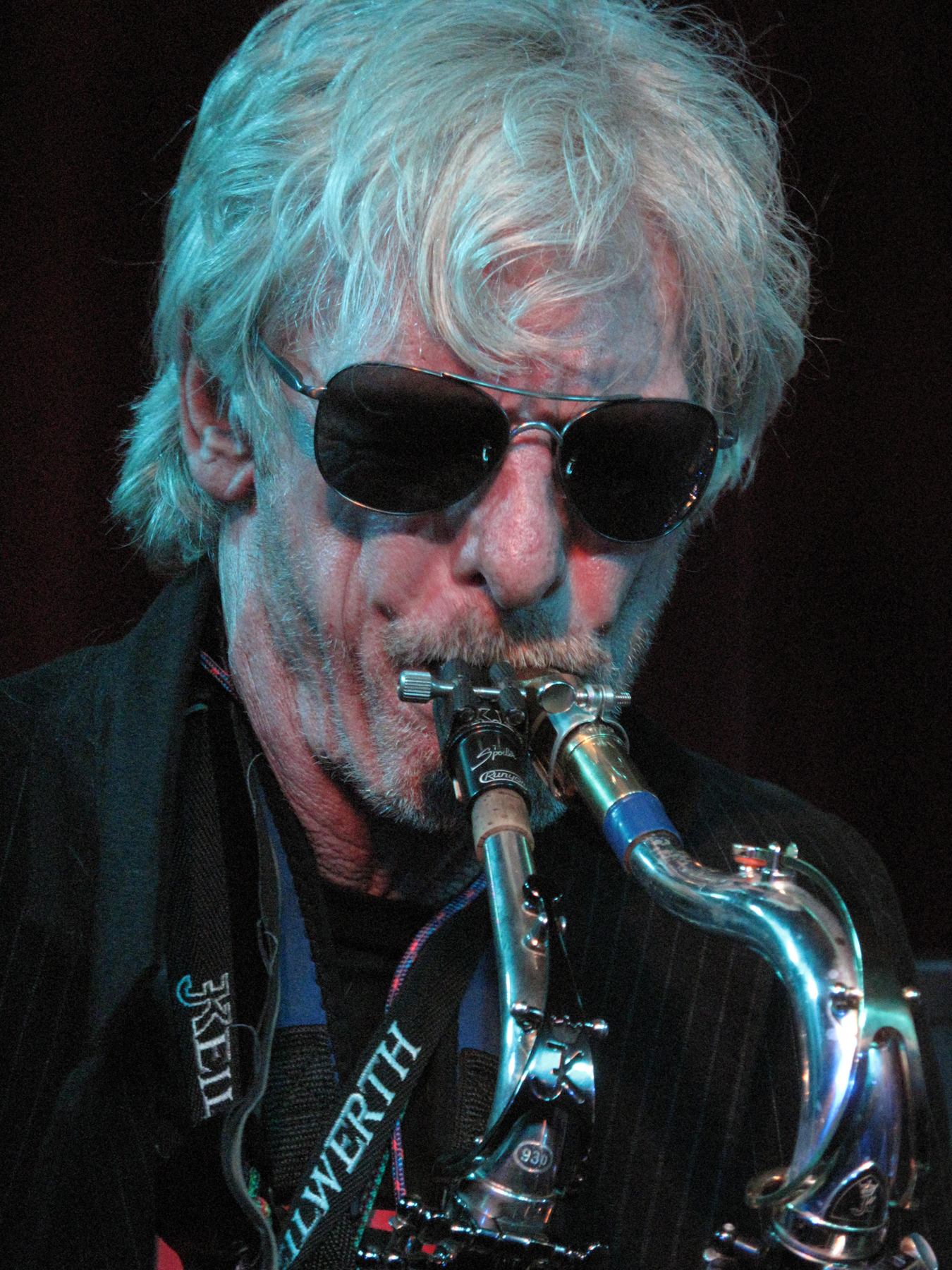
- Payne at Water Rats, 2011

Background information
- Born: David Stanley Payne; 11 August 1944 (age 81); Willesden, London, England
- Origin: Clacton-on-Sea, Essex, England
- Genres: Rock; jazz
- Occupation: Musician
- Instruments: Alto saxophone; tenor saxophone; soprano saxophone
- Years active: 1960s–present
- Label: Stiff
- Website: theblockheads.com

David Stanley Payne (born 11 August 1944) is an English saxophonist best known as a member of Ian Dury's backing band The Blockheads, and for his twin saxophone solo on their 1978 UK No. 1 single "Hit Me with Your Rhythm Stick". He also appeared on the first version of Nico's fifth studio album Drama of Exile (1981).

According to Pete Frame's Rock Family Trees, Payne grew up in Clacton-on-Sea, Essex and started playing the clarinet because of his enjoyment of Dixieland jazz. On hearing swing, bebop and Dexter Gordon in the 1960s he moved to London, and began taking lessons and going to jazz clubs. He also took up the soprano saxophone, and began playing in mixed media events. He was drawn into The People Band, and moved with them to the Netherlands.

He met Ian Dury when he visited London in late 1970—"He thought I was a junkie, I thought he was an idiot"—and returned to the Netherlands. After the People Band played a gig in London with Dury's proto-punk Pub Rock band Kilburn and the High Roads in 1971, he was coerced into joining them for a jam at their home, and ended up staying with the band until it broke up in June 1975. He thereafter returned to Clacton; he played two gigs with Ronnie Lane, and a few with The Fabulous Poodles. In the meantime Dury launched a solo career, and Payne contributed to a few songs on Dury's first album, New Boots and Panties!!, in 1977. Payne, however, joined Wreckless Eric's band.

After the completion of his album and its success, Dury badgered Payne into rejoining his band, now called The Blockheads, full-time; Payne did, and became co-composer of numerous songs in their catalogue. He left the band in August 1998 but returned for an exclusive performance of New Boots And Panties!! on 17 April 2008, and on 30 April 2009 for two shows at The Electric Ballroom in Camden.

== Discography ==
=== Albums ===
- Handsome – Kilburn and the High Roads (1975)
- Wotabunch! – Ian Dury & The Kilburns (1977)
- New Boots and Panties!! – Ian Dury (1977)
- Wreckless Eric – Wreckless Eric (1978)
- Do It Yourself – Ian Dury & The Blockheads (1979)
- Laughter – Ian Dury & The Blockheads (1980)
- Drama of Exile – Nico (1981)
- It's Personal – City Boy (1981)
- The Best Of Kilburn & The High Roads – Kilburn and the High Roads (EP, 1983)
- 4,000 Weeks' Holiday – Ian Dury & The Music Students (1984)
- Hold On To Your Structure – Ian Dury & The Blockheads (VHS- Live Video, 1985)
- Apples – Ian Dury (1989)
- Live! Warts 'n' Audience – Ian Dury & The Blockheads (live album, 1990)
- The Bus Driver's Prayer & Other Stories – Ian Dury (1992)
- Mr. Love Pants – Ian Dury & The Blockheads (1998)
- Ten More Turnips from the Tip – Ian Dury & The Blockheads (2002)
