= Ian Dury discography =

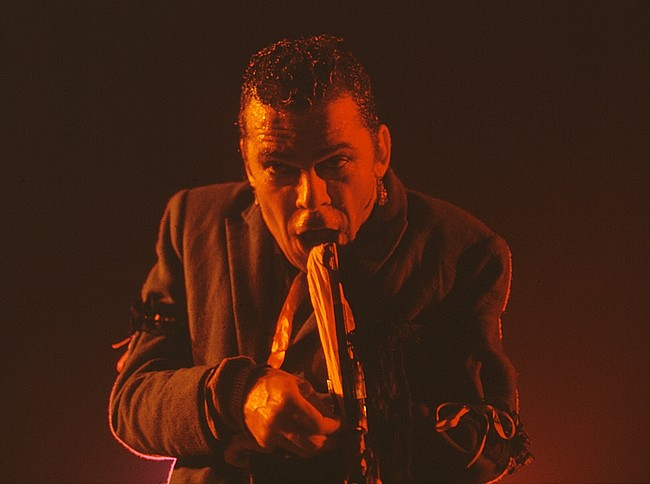
- Dury performing in London, 1978
- Studio albums: 11
- Extended plays: 2
- Live albums: 4
- Compilation albums: 14
- Singles: 30
- Video albums: 3
- Box sets: 4

This is the discography of British musician Ian Dury, including with Kilburn and the High Roads and the Blockheads.

== Albums ==
=== Studio albums ===
Title	Album details	Peak chart positions										Certifications
Title	Album details	UK	AUS	CAN	GER	NL	NOR	NZ	SPA	SWE	US	Certifications
Handsome	Released: 23 May 1975; Label: Dawn; Formats: LP; As part of Kilburn and the High Roads	—	—	—	—	—	—	—	—	—	—	
New Boots and Panties!!	Released: 30 September 1977; Label: Stiff; Formats: LP, MC, 8-track	5	13	—	29	—	—	7	—	40	168	UK: Platinum
Wotabunch!	Released: October 1978; Label: Warner Bros.; Formats: LP, MC; As part of Kilburn and the High Roads	—	—	—	—	—	—	—	—	—	—	
Do It Yourself	Released: 18 May 1979; Label: Stiff; Formats: LP, MC, 8-track; With the Blockheads	2	19	59	23	38	12	18	—	8	126	UK: Gold
Laughter	Released: 28 November 1980; Label: Stiff; Formats: LP, MC; With the Blockheads	48	27	—	—	—	—	—	—	29	159	UK: Silver
Lord Upminster	Released: 14 September 1981; Label: Polydor; Formats: LP, MC	53	44	—	—	—	—	—	26	32	—	
4,000 Weeks' Holiday	Released: 27 January 1984; Label: Polydor; Formats: LP, MC; With the Music Students	54	—	—	—	—	—	—	—	—	—	
Apples	Released: October 1989; Label: WEA; Formats: CD, LP, MC	—	—	—	—	—	—	—	—	—	—	
The Bus Driver's Prayer & Other Stories	Released: 10 November 1992; Label: Demon; Formats: CD, MC	—	—	—	—	—	—	—	—	—	—	
Mr. Love Pants	Released: 29 June 1997; Label: CNR Music, Ronnie Harris; Formats: CD; With the Blockheads	57	—	—	—	—	—	—	—	—	—	
Ten More Turnips from the Tip	Released: 18 March 2002; Label: Ronnie Harris; Formats: CD, LP; With the Blockheads	60	—	—	—	—	—	—	—	—	—	
"—" denotes releases that did not chart or were not released in that territory.

=== Live albums ===
Title	Album details
Live! Warts 'n' Audience	Released: April 1991; Label: Demon; Formats: CD, LP, MC; With the Blockheads
Straight from the Desk	Released: June 2001; Label: Blockhead; Formats: CD; With the Blockheads
Live at Rockpalast 1978	Released: 27 July 2012; Label: MIG; Formats: CD, digital download; With the Blockheads
Live at the Old Waldorf, San Francisco 1978	Released: 15 September 2017; Label: Vogon; Formats: CD; With the Blockheads

=== Compilation albums ===
Title	Album details	Peak chart positions			Certifications
Title	Album details	UK	AUS	NZ	Certifications
Jukebox Dury	Released: 20 November 1981; Label: Stiff; Formats: LP, MC	—	42	20	UK: Silver
Sex & Drugs & Rock & Roll	Released: 4 May 1987; Label: Demon; Formats: CD, LP, MC	—	—	—	
Souled Out to Rock	Released: 1990; Label: Polydor; Formats: CD, MC	—	—	—	
Sex & Drugs & Rock & Roll: The Best Of	Released: 5 May 1992; Label: Rhino; Formats: CD, MC	—	—	—	
The Very Best of Ian Dury & the Blockheads – Reasons to Be Cheerful	Released: 1 October 1999; Label: Papillon/EMI; Formats: CD, MC	40	—	—	UK: Gold
Sex and Drugs and Rock 'n' Roll – Greatest Hits	Released: 2004; Label: Landmark; Formats: 2xCD	—	—	—	
Reasons to Be Cheerful – The Best of Ian Dury	Released: 26 September 2005; Label: Music Club Deluxe; Formats: 2xCD	80	—	—	UK: Gold
Essex Boy: An Introduction to Ian Dury	Released: September 2006; Label: Music Club; Formats: CD	—	—	—	
The Best of Sex & Drugs & Rock & Roll	Released: 13 November 2007; Label: The Great American Music Company; Formats: CD	—	—	—	
Sex & Drugs & Rock & Roll - The Essential Collection	Released: 5 February 2010; Label: DMG TV; Formats: CD	51	—	—	
Greatest	Released: 25 May 2015; Label: Crimson; Formats: CD	—	—	—	
What a Waste – The Collection	Released: 17 February 2017; Label: Music Club Deluxe; Formats: CD	—	—	—	
Greatest Hits	Released: 22 June 2018; Label: Demon; Formats: LP	—	—	—	
Hit Me! The Best of Ian Dury	Released: 16 October 2020; Label: BMG; Formats: 3xCD, 2xLP, digital download	—	—	—	
"—" denotes releases that did not chart or were not released in that territory.

=== Box sets ===
Title	Album details
Boxed	Released: 1991; Label: Demon; Formats: 3xCD
The Stiff Singles / The Promo Videos / The Peel Session	Released: 27 October 2008; Label: Edsel; Formats: 8xCD+DVD
Classics	Released: 25 October 2010; Label: Edsel; Formats: 5xCD
The Stiff Recordings 1977–1980	Released: 11 November 2018; Label: Demon; Formats: 4xLP

=== Video albums ===
Title	Album details
Hold On to Your Structure – Live at the Hammersmith Odeon	Released: 1985; Label: EMI; Formats: VHS
Rare and Unseen	Released: 12 April 2010; Label: Wienerworld; Formats: DVD
Live at Rockpalast 1978	Released: 27 July 2012; Label: MIG; Formats: DVD

== EPs ==
Title	EP details
The Best of Kilburn & the High Roads Featuring Ian Dury	Released: November 1977; Label: Bonaparte
The Pub Ska EP	Released: 2010; Label: 2 Stick; Limited release

== Singles ==
Title	Year	Peak chart positions										Album
Title	Year	UK	AUS	BEL (FL)	GER	IRE	NL	NOR	NZ	SWE	US Dance	Album
"Rough Kids" (as Kilburn and the High Roads)	1974	—	—	—	—	—	—	—	—	—	—	Handsome
"Crippled with Nerves" (as Kilburn and the High Roads)	1975	—	—	—	—	—	—	—	—	—	—	Handsome
"Sex & Drugs & Rock & Roll"	1977	—	—	12	—	—	11	—	—	12	—	Non-album single
"Sweet Gene Vincent" (with the Blockheads)	1977	—	—	—	—	—	—	—	—	—	—	New Boots and Panties!!
"Wake Up and Make Love with Me"	1978	—	—	26	—	—	32	—	—	—	—	New Boots and Panties!!
"What a Waste" (with the Blockheads)	1978	9	—	—	—	—	—	—	—	—	—	Non-album single
"Billy Bentley" (as Kilburn and the High Roads featuring Ian Dury)	1978	—	—	—	—	—	—	—	—	—	—	Wotabunch!
"Hit Me with Your Rhythm Stick" (with the Blockheads)	1978	1	2	14	22	3	9	7	3	9	79	Non-album single
"Inbetweenies" (with the Blockheads; Continental Europe-only release)	1979	—	—	—	—	—	—	—	—	—	—	Do It Yourself
"Reasons to Be Cheerful, Part 3" (with the Blockheads)	1979	3	65	—	—	20	27	—	—	24	—	Non-album singles
"I Want to Be Straight" (with the Blockheads)	1980	22	18	—	—	—	—	—	—	—	—	Non-album singles
"Sueperman's Big Sister" (with the Blockheads)	1980	51	90	—	—	—	—	—	—	—	—	Laughter
"Spasticus Autisticus"	1981	—	50	—	—	—	48	—	—	—	32	Lord Upminster
"Funky Disco (Pops)" (Spain and Australia-only release)	1981	—	—	—	—	—	—	—	—	—	—	Lord Upminster
"Ban the Bomb" (New Zealand-only release)	1982	—	—	—	—	—	—	—	—	—	—	4.000 Weeks' Holiday
"Really Glad You Came"	1983	98	—	—	—	—	—	—	—	—	—	4.000 Weeks' Holiday
"Very Personal" (with the Music Students)	1984	—	—	—	—	—	—	—	—	—	—	4.000 Weeks' Holiday
"Hit Me with Your Rhythm Stick" (with the Blockheads; Paul Hardcastle remix)	1985	55	—	—	—	—	—	—	28	—	—	Non-album singles
"Profoundly in Love with Pandora"	1985	45	—	—	—	—	—	—	—	—	—	Non-album singles
"Average" (by Box of Frogs featuring Ian Dury)	1986	—	—	—	—	—	—	—	—	—	—	Strange Land (by Box of Frogs)
"Burning Beds Salsa" (with Pia Frankenberg)	1988	—	—	—	—	—	—	—	—	—	—	Non-album single
"Apples"	1989	—	—	—	—	—	—	—	—	—	—	Apples
"Hit Me with Your Rhythm Stick" (with the Blockheads; The Flying remix)	1991	73	—	—	—	—	—	—	—	—	—	Apples
"Itinerant Child" (with the Blockheads)	1997	—	—	—	—	—	—	—	—	—	—	Mr. Love Pants
"Mash It Up Harry" (with the Blockheads)	1998	—	—	—	—	—	—	—	—	—	—	Mr. Love Pants
"Sex & Drugs & Rock'n'Roll" (with the Blockheads; Klubbheads remix)	1999	—	—	—	—	—	—	—	—	—	—	Non-album singles
"Y2K the Bug Is Coming" (with Jim's Super Stereoworld and Fuzz Townshend)	1999	—	—	—	—	—	—	—	—	—	—	Non-album singles
"Drip Fed Fred" (Madness featuring Ian Dury)	2000	55	—	—	—	—	—	—	—	—	—	Wonderful (by Madness)
"Dance Little Rude Boy" (with the Blockheads)	2002	—	—	—	—	—	98	—	—	—	—	Ten More Turnips from the Tip
"One Love" (with the Blockheads)	2002	—	—	—	—	—	—	—	—	—	—	Ten More Turnips from the Tip
"—" denotes releases that did not chart or were not released in that territory.

== See also ==
- The Blockheads discography
