= The Blockheads discography =

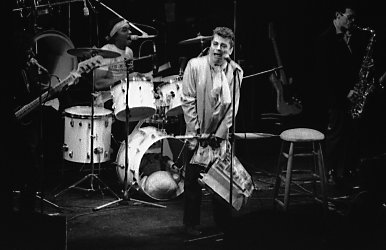
- Studio albums: 6
- Compilation albums: 3
- Singles: 10
- Video albums: 1

Formed in 1977 to promote Ian Durys' album New Boots and Panties!! on the first Stiff Records tour of the UK, Chaz Jankel, Norman Watt-Roy, Charlie Charles, John Turnbull and Mick Gallagher became known as 'The Blockheads' (a reference to a song on Dury's album). As 'Ian Dury & The Blockheads' they went back out on tour, this time without Jankel, and in 1978 released "What a Waste"/"Wake Up and Make Love with Me" a single that reached number five in the UK charts. They were then joined by saxophonist Davey Payne and toured the US supporting Lou Reed across North America, ending with their own dates in California (with backline roadie Pete Rush).

In late 1978 Jankel returned to the fold and composed "Hit Me with Your Rhythm Stick" with Dury. The band recorded it in The Workhouse Studios, Old Kent Road, London and in 1979 had a number one hit record with it in the UK. Ian Dury & The Blockheads went on to record the Do It Yourself (1979) album, toured Europe and the UK recording in Rome "Reasons to be Cheerful, Part 3", which was released as a single in late 1979 reaching number three in the UK charts.

In 1980 Jankel, once again, left the band to pursue solo projects in California and former Dr. Feelgood guitarist Wilko Johnson joined Dury, Watt-Roy, Turnbull, Charles, Gallagher and Payne to record and release a third album for Stiff Records called Laughter (1980) and released "I Want to be Straight" and "Supermans Big Sister" as singles. They toured throughout 1981 in the UK and Europe, sometimes augmented by Don Cherry on trumpet, ending the year with a tour of Australia.

In 1982 Ian Dury & The Blockheads disbanded and were not to play together again until 1987, when they went out to Japan in June to play three shows in four days, disbanding again until 1990, when the death of Charles in September of that year re-united them to play two Benefit gigs at The Forum, Camden Town, in aid of Charles' family. Jankel returned from America and Steven Monti picked up the drumsticks. The band, now augmented by Merlin Rhys-Jones on guitar and Will Parnell on percussion, recorded a live album Warts & Audience at the Brixton Academy in December 1990.

Jankel returned to California and the band toured Spain in January 1991. Once again the band stopped working until August 1994 when, with the return to England of Jankel, the band were invited to play the Madstock Festival in Finsbury Park in August, which led to a series of hit-and-run gigs in Europe, Ireland, the UK and Japan throughout the rest of 1994 and 1995. In March 1996 Dury was diagnosed with cancer and, after recovering from an operation, was determined to write another album.

== Studio albums ==
Year of release	Album title	Notes
1979	Do It Yourself	
1980	Laughter	Final Album with Charley Charles
1997	Mr. Love Pants	
2002	Ten More Turnips from the Tip	Final Studio Album with Ian Dury
2001	Brand New Boots and Panties	A tribute album, a re-recording of New Boots with guest singers
2004	Where's the Party?	
2009	Staring Down the Barrel	
2013	Same Horse Different Jockey	
2017	Beyond the Call of Dury	

== Live albums ==
Year of release	Album title	Notes
1990	Live! Warts 'n' Audience	
2001	Straight from the Desk	Recorded in 1978
2003	Straight from the Desk – 2	Live at Patti Pavilion
2006	Live in Colchester	(exclusively available via iTunes)
2008	30 (30th Anniversary Show)	(exclusively available via iTunes)

== Compilation albums ==
Year	Title	Notes
1978	Live Stiffs Live	
2005	Reasons to be Cheerful	
2010	Sex & Drugs & Rock & Roll	

== Videos ==
Year	Title	Notes
1978	Live at Rockpalast 1978	MIG – MIG 90517
1985	Hold on to Your Structure	
2006	Live in Colchester DVD	

== Singles ==
Year	Title	Peak chart positions										Album	Notes
Year	Title	UK	AUS	BEL (FL)	GER	IRE	NL	NOR	NZ	SWE	US Dance		
1977	"Sex & Drugs & Rock & Roll"	—	—	12	—	—	11	—	—	12	—		
1977	"Sweet Gene Vincent"	—	—	—	—	—	—	—	—	—	—		
1977	"Billericay Dickie"	—	—	—	—	—	—	—	—	—	—		
1978	"What a Waste"	9	—	—	—	—	—	—	—	—	—		
1978	"Hit Me with Your Rhythm Stick"	1	2	14	22	3	9	7	3	9	79		
1979	"Reasons to be Cheerful, Part 3"	3	65	—	—	20	27	—	—	24	—		
1980	"Sueperman's Big Sister"	51	90	—	—	—	—	—	—	—	—	Laughter	
1982	"Twist & Shout"	—	—	—	—	—	—	—	—	—	—		Released 10 December produced by Laurie Latham; B-side: "Take Out the Lead"
1985	"Hit Me with Your Rhythm Stick"	55	—	—	—	—	—	—	28	—	—		
1999	"Dance Little Rude Boy"	—	—	—	—	—	—	—	—	—	—	Ten More Turnips from the Tip	

== See also ==
- Ian Dury discography
