= Apples (album) =

Studio album by Ian Dury
- Released: October 1989
- Recorded: July 1989
- Length: 40:19
- Label: WEA
- Producer: Ian Horne; Mick Gallagher; Ian Dury

Ian Dury chronology
| 4,000 Weeks' Holiday (1984) | Apples (1989) | The Bus Driver's Prayer & Other Stories (1992) |

Singles from Apples
- 1. "Apples/Byline Browne" Released: 16 October 1989

Apples is the sixth studio album by Ian Dury, released in October 1989 by WEA. It was the soundtrack to his short-lived stage-show of same name though it was recorded before the show opened. The album contains twelve of the twenty tracks from the show. The album was reissued with no bonus tracks on 31 October 2011 by Edsel Records.

== Stage show ==
Apples was a stage show written by Dury with music co-written by Blockheads member Mick Gallagher on the request of Max Stafford-Clark. The show opened for ten days of previews on 6 October 1989 and to the public 12 days later. All the shows were held at the Royal Court Theatre in London and were directed by Simon Curtis, who Dury had worked with previously.

The show only lasted 10 weeks before closing and reviews were not favourable, nor were they for the album of same name. The most common complaint about the show was Dury's script. Gallagher echoed this sentiment in Sex And Drugs And Rock And Roll: The Life of Ian Dury. The play was about Byline Brown, a journalist played by Dury himself investigating a corrupt minister Hugo Sinister.

In the original Ian Dury and the Kilburns version of Apples, the stall owner's name is Baxter, and the dancer from Soho's name is Jemima. This was changed to Simpson and Delilah for the final version. Baxter and Jemima are the names of Ian Dury's eldest children.

=== Setlist ===
Act 1

- You Are Here
- Byline Browne
- Courtroom Song
- Sinister Minister Theme
- Bus Drivers' Prayer
- Apples
- Love Is All
- Still Waters
- Another Dark Day for Derek
- Sally
- Looking for Harry
- Bit of Kit
- Game On
- The Right People
- On Top On Top On Top

Act 2

- England's Glory
- All Those Who Say Okay
- Sinister Minister Theme Reprise
- George and Reenie
- Sally
- On the Game
- P.C. Honey
- It's You
- The Right People Reprise
- Love Is All Reprise
- Riding the Outskirts of Fantasy

== Recording the album ==
WEA gave Dury and Gallagher £70,000 for recording costs. According to Gallagher in Song By Song, most of the recording was done for £25,000 with Dury's vocals costing around £30,000 on their own. Dury was still drinking heavily at this time but following this session his behaviour would steadily improve. Recording took place at Liquidator and Westside Studios under the production of Ian Horne, who had been Dury's sound engineer on his Stiff Records releases, Do It Yourself and Laughter. It was not made by the "Apple Blossom Orchestra" that played on the stage shows (they were formed after the album's completion) though some players on the record were part of that band.

In addition to the show's leading lady Frances Ruffelle who sang vocals on "Looking for Harry", "Game On", and the humorous duet "Love Is All", Dury's long-time friend and former Stiff Records artist Wreckless Eric also appeared to perform nearly all of the vocals for "PC Honey"', a song reportedly inspired by a policewoman who came backstage after an argument between Dury and his then girlfriend while touring with the Music Students to promote 4,000 Weeks' Holiday, his previous album five years earlier. Much of the band Kokomo also appear on backing vocals.

The final line of the album's credits is 'remembering Pete Rush'. Pete Rush was Ian Dury's personal assistant and minder for some years until Dury was forced to let Rush go because his antics were causing too many problems on tour. Rush died before the album's recording. Dury would later write a song about him, "The Ballad of the Sulphate Strangler", which would eventually be included on the posthumous Ten More Turnips From The Tip album. Dury also mentions Rush in version of "England’s Glory" on Apples.

Even though The Bus Driver's Prayer And Other Stories is named after the track, this is Dury's first recording of the song.

== Critical reception ==
Professional ratings
Review scores
| Source | Rating |
|---|---|
| AllMusic | 3/5 stars |
| Record Collector | 3/5 stars |

It is common for reviewers to unfavourably compare an artist's new work to their old, and this was the case with Apples with critics pointing out the songs were not as good as Dury's 'old stuff'. Ironically, two of the tracks, "Apples" and "England's Glory", were written over 13 years earlier while Dury was still in Kilburn and the High Roads. A studio recording of "Apples" (with slightly different lyrics) and a live version of "England's Glory" by Ian Dury and the Kilburns (the final phase of Dury's influential pub-rock outfit) are included on Edsel's re-issue of New Boots and Panties!!. When Dury was beginning work on Do It Yourself, the New Boots' follow up, his management begged him to revive old Kilburns numbers; Peter Jenner (one of his management) stated in Ian Dury & The Blockheads: Song By Song that "England's Glory" was a "hit in the making". Likewise "Byline Brown" had been written around 8 years before.

== Track listing ==
All tracks are written by Ian Dury and Mick Gallagher, except where noted.

| No. | Title | Writer(s) | Length |
|---|---|---|---|
| 1. | "Apples" | Dury, Rod Melvin, Chas Jankel | 4:18 |
| 2. | "Love Is All" | | 4:34 |
| 3. | "Byline Brown" | | 3:06 |
| 4. | "Bit O' Kit" | Dury | 2:07 |
| 5. | "Game On" | | 3:08 |
| 6. | "Looking For Harry" | | 3:34 |
| 7. | "England's Glory" | Dury, Melvin | 4:14 |
| 8. | "Bus Driver's Prayer" | Traditional, arranged and adapted by Dury | 0:56 |
| 9. | "PC Honey" | | 3:21 |
| 10. | "The Right People" | | 2:55 |
| 11. | "All Those Who Say Okay" | | 3:51 |
| 12. | "Riding The Outskirts of Fantasy" | | 4:08 |

== Personnel ==
- Ian Dury – vocals
- Frances Ruffelle – vocals
- Mick Gallagher – keyboards, backing vocals
- Merlin Rhys-Jones – guitars, backing vocals
- Davey Payne – saxophones
- Michael McEvoy – bass, synthesisers, backing vocals
- Ray Cooper – percussion
- Steve White – drums, percussion
- Frank Collins – backing vocals
- Dyan Birch – backing vocals
- Paddie McHugh – backing vocals
- Carol Kenyon – backing vocals
- Ian Horne – backing vocals

Additional personnel

- Wreckless Eric – lead vocal on "PC Honey"
- Ed Speight – guitar
- Steve Nieve – piano
- David Dixon – backing vocals
- James Sparkle – backing vocals
- Delphi Newman – backing vocals
- Markus Dravs – backing vocals
- John Land – backing vocals
- Ben – backing vocals

Technical

- Ian Horne – producer, engineer
- Mick Gallagher – producer
- Ian Dury – producer
- Richard Sullivan – engineer
- James Sparkle – assistant engineer
- Markus Dravs – assistant engineer
- Len – assistant engineer
- Peter Blake – cover illustration
- Séan Hampson – layout

== Sources ==
- Sex And Drugs And Rock And Roll: The Life of Ian Dury by Richard Balls, first published 2000, Omnibus Press
- Ian Dury & The Blockheads: Song By Song by Jim Drury, first published 2003, Sanctuary Publishing.
- On My Life BBC2 Documentary first broadcast 25 September 1999
