= Mr. Love Pants =

Studio album by Ian Dury and the Blockheads
- Released: 29 June 1998
- Recorded: October–November 1996; Mixed March 1997
- Studio: AIR (London)
- Genres: New wave; pub rock; funk
- Length: 46:44
- Labels: East Central One; Ronnie Harris
- Producers: Ian Dury; The Blockheads

Ian Dury and the Blockheads chronology
The Bus Driver's Prayer & Other Stories (1992)	Mr. Love Pants (1998)	Straight from the Desk (2001)

Singles from Mr. Love Pants
- 1. "Mash It Up Harry" Released: 1998

Professional ratings
Review scores
Source	Rating
Allmusic	4.5/5 stars

Mr. Love Pants is a 1998 album by Ian Dury and the Blockheads, released on East Central One under Dury's own label Ronnie Harris Records (named after his accountant).

== History ==
The album would be the last studio album Dury would make before his death in 2000 of colorectal cancer. It was his first studio album for five years following The Bus Driver's Prayer & Other Stories in 1992 and his first studio album with the Blockheads for 17 years since Laughter in 1980 (though they had produced a live album Warts 'n' Audience in 1991) and is considered by many to be the true successor to his 1977 album New Boots and Panties!! - on his BBC documentary Dury dismissed all of the albums between Do It Yourself and Mr. Love Pants as inferior.

The album took around four years to complete and the writing commenced at Acre Farm, Twyford, near Reading, Berkshire, in 1993. Initially Chaz Jankel worked with Ian Dury after returning from living in America for most of the 1980s, but arguments between the two and soundman Ian Horne led to Jankel leaving. However, at least two songs, "Itinerant Child" and "Bed O' Roses No. 9", were written before he left. Deserted, Dury called Merlin Rhys-Jones who had been in the Music Students (Ian Dury's band for the album 4,000 Weeks' Holiday). They wrote ten songs together before arguments over money caused Rhys-Jones to leave. Two of these would eventually make the album: "Jack Shit George" and "Cacka Boom".

It is generally considered that Ian Dury's first bout with cancer is what prompted him to reform the Blockheads and work with them solely, which he would do for the rest of his life. Dury's new minder, Derek Hussey a.k.a. Derek the Draw, managed to get Jankel and Dury talking again, if only for a bizarre phonecall from Dury regarding touring America and a fictitious uncle of Jankel's. This led to Jankel having his solicitor write to Dury and keyboardist Mickey Gallagher saying he would never play with the band again, though he relented after discovering Dury had cancer.

The album was recorded at Air Studios, which was also being used by Michael Jackson and was surprisingly trouble free compared to the troublesome recording sessions usually caused by Dury, again his personality changes are attributed to his first bout with cancer - the only major incident being Dury randomly deciding to replace new drummer Steve Monti with Bernard Purdie but after constant opposition from his band Dury relented.

"Itinerant Child" was to be released as Ian Dury & the Blockhead's first single in 17 years (since 1980's "Sueperman's Big Sister") and a video was recorded but East Central One nixed the idea. In the end "Mash it Up Harry" was released instead on both CD and 12" record.

== Track listing ==
All tracks are written by Ian Dury and Chaz Jankel; except where indicated.

No.	Title	Writer(s)	Length
1.	"Jack Shit George"	Dury, Merlin Rhys-Jones	4:23
2.	"The Passing Show"		4.24
3.	"You're My Baby"		3:30
4.	"Honeysuckle Highway"		4:49
5.	"Itinerant Child"		4:46
6.	"Geraldine"	Dury, Mick Gallagher	3:37
7.	"Cacka Boom"	Dury, Merlin Rhys-Jones	4:49
8.	"Bed O. Roses No. 9"		5:19
9.	"Heavy Living"		5:08
10.	"Mash It Up Harry"		5:55

2015 CD reissue bonus track
No.	Title	Length
1.	"Mash It Up Harry" ('Future Funk Squad' radio remix from "Mash It Up Harry" CD single)	4:31

== Personnel ==
Ian and the Blockheads

- Ian Dury - vocals
- Chaz Jankel - guitar, keyboards, arrangements
- Mick Gallagher - keyboards
- Davey Payne - saxophones, flute
- John Turnbull - guitar
- Norman Watt-Roy - bass
- Steve Monti - drums

with:

- The Breezeblocks - backing vocals

Technical

- The Blockheads - producer
- Rupert Coulson - engineer
- Jon Bailey - engineer, mixing assistant
- Kevin Paul - engineer
- Huw - engineer
- Eon - engineer
- Laurie Latham - mixing
- Storm Thorgerson - cover design
- Sam Brooks - cover design assistant, dog photographs
- Hannah Evans - cover design assistant
- Jon Crossland - graphics, illustrations
- 'Duncan Poundcake' - band photographs
- Rupert Truman - dog photographs

== Sources ==
- Sex and Drugs and Rock and Roll: The Life of Ian Dury by Richard Balls, first published 2000, Omnibus Press
- Ian Dury & The Blockheads: Song By Song by Jim Drury, first published 2003, Sanctuary Publishing.
