= Free Seed Films =

British film company

- Industry: Film; Music; Radio
- Founded: 2012
- Website: freeseedfilms.com

Free Seed Films is an independent film company. The company has contributed to the No More Page 3 campaign, creating the official advert and campaign song which charted in December 2014. Months later, the concept of the page was removed.

The company has also created music videos for British punk band The Blockheads for their singles Express Yourself and Boys will be Boys, from the album Same Horse Different Jockey.

The company also has a weekly show on Soho Radio, produced by Steve Harcourt (who is also a member of 90s band Collapsed Lung). The show is hosted by Miss Baby Sol and Ben Ramble.
