= International Year of Disabled Persons =

1981 year of disabled people

The year 1981 was proclaimed the International Year of Disabled Persons (IYDP) by the United Nations. It called for a plan of action with an emphasis on equalization of opportunities, rehabilitation and prevention of disabilities. The slogan of IYDP was "a wheelchair in every home", defined as the right of persons with disabilities to take part fully in the life and development of their societies, enjoy living conditions equal to those of other citizens, and have an equal share in improved conditions resulting from socio-economic development.

A major outcome of the International Year of Disabled Persons was the formulation of the World Programme of Action Concerning Disabled Persons adopted by the UN General Assembly in December 1982. This also is recognized by the Preamble (f) of the Convention on the Rights of Persons with Disabilities.

The International Decade of Disabled Persons ran from 1983 to 1993. It was closed by a speech in the General Assembly by Dr. Robert R. Davila, then an Assistant Secretary in the U.S. Department of Education who declared that "before the year is up, we expect the number of disabled persons to double".

December 3 each year, since 1992, is identified by the United Nations as the International Day of Persons with Disabilities.

British new wave singer-songwriter Ian Dury, himself a disabled person, released a song titled "Spasticus Autisticus" in 1981, which he intended as a scathing critique of the International Year, which he viewed as "patronising" and "crashingly insensitive".

== See also ==
- International observance
