= The Bus Driver's Prayer & Other Stories =

Studio album by Ian Dury
- Released: 1992
- Recorded: 1991, 1992
- Studios: Liquidator Studios, London; Joe's Garage, London
- Length: 47:06
- Label: Demon
- Producer: none credited

Ian Dury chronology
Apples (1989)	The Bus Driver's Prayer & Other Stories (1992)	Mr. Love Pants (1998)

The Bus Driver's Prayer & Other Stories is the seventh solo studio album by the English singer Ian Dury, released in 1992 by Demon. Despite being recorded after the successful live reunion of Ian Dury and the Blockheads, inspired by the death of their drummer, Charley Charles, the album is not a Blockheads record. All of the band, however, except bassist Norman Watt-Roy, appear on the album.

== History ==
The album has its origins in a 1991 Irish film After Midnight. When asked to produce music for the film, Dury recruited Blockhead Mick Gallagher and Music Students member Merlin Rhys-Jones. Two songs, "O'Donegal" and "Quick Quick Slow", along with another, "Bye Bye Dublin", were written around this time, and at least the latter two were recorded in Shepherd's Bush, London along with incidental music for the film.

Dury's in-studio behavior had become notably better than during the 1980s and would steadily improve. One notable drink-fueled event, however, while recording the album, on the Mile End Road, London (owned by the brother of Madness keyboard player Mike Barson), is recounted often by Gallagher and Rhys-Jones. Dury, drunk on Budweiser became furious, allegedly after a technician named Frasier erased Gallagher's keyboard part for "Quick Quick Slow", and threatened to burn the studio down. When he wouldn't calm down, the police were called and after spitting at them and calling them 'homosexuals', Dury was arrested.

Bus Driver's Prayer is almost always considered a 'return to form' for Dury as a lyricist, and is considered as such by both Dury biographies Ian Dury & The Blockheads: Song by Song and Sex & Drugs & Rock & Roll: The Life of Ian Dury. The most commonly quoted songs to illustrate this are "Poor Joey" and "Poo-Poo in the Prawn".

Was a very hungry fella

I defrosted my Paella
Came down with Salmonella
Three weeks intensive care
They failed to send technicians in
To check the air conditioning
Which was unfortunately transmissioning

A case of Legionnaire's

— from "Poo-Poo in the Prawn"

Demon Records was unhappy with the final album and hardly promoted it, despite favorable reviews, including a March 1993 issue of Vox, where it was awarded six out of ten stars. Mick Gallagher continues to praise the album as one of his favorites and noted in Song by Song that it was the album by which he personally mourned Dury, following the singer's death in 2000. The album has received criticism, however, for its use of a drum machine.

== Reception ==
Professional ratings
Review scores
Source	Rating
AllMusic	3/5 stars

AllMusic's Stephen Thomas Erlewine called the album "an engaging collection of character sketches and stories," and added that "the album may lack strong hooks and melodies, yet Dury diehards will find that his wry observations are just as subtle and humorous as ever."

== Track listing ==
Songwriting credits adapted from the 2015 vinyl edition liner notes.

All tracks are written by Ian Dury and Mick Gallagher; except where indicated.

No.	Title	Writer(s)	Length
1.	"That's Enough of That"	Ian Dury, Mick Gallagher, Merlin Rhys-Jones	4:49
2.	"Bill Haley's Last Words"	Ian Dury, Mick Gallagher, Merlin Rhys-Jones	3:12
3.	"Poor Joey"		3:50
4.	"Quick Quick Slow"		3:14
5.	"Fly in the Ointment"		2:55
6.	"O'Donegal"		3:53
7.	"Poo-Poo in the Prawn"		3:17
8.	"London Talking"		1:15
9.	"Have a Word"	Ian Dury, Mick Gallagher, Merlin Rhys-Jones	3:57
10.	"D'Orine the Cow"		3:18
11.	"Your Horoscope"		4:00
12.	"No Such Thing as Love"	Ian Dury, Merlin Rhys-Jones	3:38
13.	"Two Old Dogs Without a Name"		4:43
14.	"Bus Driver's Prayer"	Traditional; arranged and adapted by Ian Dury	0:59

2004 CD reissue bonus disc - album outtakes
No.	Title	Writer(s)	Length
1.	"Amerind"	Dury, Chaz Jankel	4:24
2.	"I Believe"		3:27
3.	"Cowboys"	Dury, Jankel	4:32
4.	"One Love"	Dury, Jankel	3:32
5.	"Grape and Grain"	Dury, Jankel	5:32
6.	"The Writer"	Dury, Jankel	5:11
7.	"Whale"	Dury, Jankel	5:04
8.	"Itinerant Child"	Dury, Jankel	4:56

== Personnel ==
- Ian Dury – lead vocals
- Mick Gallagher – keyboards
- Merlin Rhys-Jones – guitar

Additional personnel

- Chaz Jankel – keyboards, guitars
- Michael McEvoy – bass, synthesizers on "Bus Driver's Prayer"
- Steve White – drums, percussion on "Bus Driver's Prayer"
- John Turnbull – guitars
- Davey Payne – saxophones
- Will Parnell – percussion
- Ray Cooper – percussion on "Bus Driver's Prayer"
- Chris London (courtesy Joe's Garage)

Technical

- Simon Osbourne – engineer
- Ian Horne – engineer
- Bruce Ingman – cover painting (from a design by Mike Krage)
- John Millar – photographs

Note: the album sleeve does not give information on who plays what on which track

== Re-releases ==
Problems have occurred with The Bus Driver's Prayer & Other Stories CD re-issues. Initially Demon Record's CD version did not contain any writing credits for the songs, its booklet simply included five poems written by Dury.

Edsel Records' 2004 2-CD re-issue fixed this, including writing credits above each song's lyric as with the other albums in the reissue campaign, however it erroneously lists "London Talking" as track 9 and "Have A Word" as track 8, both on the track list on the back of the CD case and in the booklet, also placing the lyrics in the wrong order.

Edsel Record's re-issue also includes a bonus disc with eight bonus tracks: unreleased tracks "Amerind", "Whale", "Grape and Grain" and "The Writer", plus four songs that would later appear on later albums with the Blockheads, "Itinerant Child" (which would appear on Mr. Love Pants) and "One Love", "Cowboys" and "I Believe" (later to be included on Ten More Turnips from the Tip).

== Trivia ==
- The voice of "Joey the Budgie" is, according to Song by Song, not Ian Dury, but Chas Jankel.
- Even though the album is named after the track, this is Ian Dury's second recording of "Bus Driver's Prayer", the original appearing on his 1989 album Apples.

== Sources ==
- Sex And Drugs And Rock And Roll: The Life Of Ian Dury by Richard Balls, first published 2000, Omnibus Press
- Ian Dury & The Blockheads: Song By Song by Jim Drury, first published 2003, Sanctuary Publishing.
- Booklet to Edsel Records 2004 CD re-issue of The Bus Driver's Prayer and Other Stories.
