= Bus Driver's Prayer =

Wordplay on the Lord's Prayer, using place names

The Bus Driver's Prayer, also known as the Busman's Lord's Prayer, is a parody of the Lord's Prayer that takes the bus driver around Greater London and the Home Counties. The words are apocryphal and have been around since at least 1960. The word play, making extensive use of puns on English place names, is typical of English humour. A Metropolitan police officer's version, entitled "The Law's Prayer", has also been devised.

== Ian Dury's version ==
The Bus Driver's Prayers has been popularised following Ian Dury's recording, originally on the soundtrack album Apples (1989) and later on The Bus Driver's Prayer & Other Stories (1992), who only used place names that referred to locations in London.

Below is a version predating Dury's recording, with alternative versions given in the notes.

Our Farnham, who art in Hendon
Harrow be Thy name.
Thy Kingston come; thy Wimbledon
In Erith as it is in Hendon.
Give us this day our daily Brent
And forgive us our Westminster
As we forgive those who Westminster against us.
And lead us not into Thames Ditton
But deliver us from Yeovil.
For Thine is the Kingston, the Purley, and the Crawley,
For Esher and Esher.
Crouch End.

== Earlier version ==
An earlier version, undated and possibly apocryphal, is provided by Nancy Lyon. This undated version is linked with the development of stations on the London Underground

Our Farnham, who art in Hendon,
Holloway, Turnpike Lane
Thy Kingston come; thy Wimbledon,
On Erith as it is in Hendon.
Give us this day our Maidenhead.
And lead us not into Penge station
But deliver us from Esher.
For Thine is the Kingston, the Tower and the Horley
For Iver and Iver
Crouch End.

Also (Anon):

Our Farnham who art in Hendon/ Harrow, Turnpike Lane/ Thy Kingston Coombe/ Thy Wimbledon/ On Erith as it is in Hemel Hempstead/ Give us this day our Maidenhead/ And forgive us our Westminsters/ As we forgive those who Thames Path against us/ And lead us not into Thames Ditton/ But deliver us from Ealing/ For Thine is the Kingston/ The Purley and the Horley/ For Iver and Iver/ Crouch End

== The Law's Prayer version ==
Our sergeant, who art in Hendon, Harrow Road be thy name,
Thy Kingston Coombe, thy Wimbledon
In Erith as it is in Hendon,
Give us this day our daily Brent and forgive us our train passes
as we forgive those who Thames Path against us.
Lead us not into Thames Ditton but deliver us from Ewell
For thine is the Kingston, the Tower and the Hornsey,
For Epsom and Esher,
Amen Corner

== See also ==
- List of songs about London
- Word play
- Puns
- Place name origins
