= Lord Upminster =

Studio album by Ian Dury
- Released: September 1981
- Recorded: April – May 1981
- Studio: Compass Point Studios, Nassau, Bahamas
- Genre: New wave, funk
- Length: 36:04
- Label: Polydor
- Producer: Chas Jankel; Steven Stanley; Ian Dury

Ian Dury chronology
Laughter (1980)	Lord Upminster (1981)	4,000 Weeks' Holiday (1984)

Singles from Lord Upminster
- 1. "Spasticus Autisticus" Released: August 1981

Lord Upminster is the second solo studio album by the English rock and roll singer-songwriter Ian Dury. It was released by Polydor Records in September 1981.

It was recorded over a period of one month at Compass Point Studios in Nassau, Bahamas with his old writing partner Chas Jankel and the reggae duo Sly and Robbie. It is also the first Dury album distributed by Polydor. It was his first solo album in four years, since New Boots and Panties!! (1977), and like that album covers a diverse range of musical styles reflecting Dury's influences and background in pub rock, taking in funk, disco, British music hall and early rock and roll, courtesy of Dury's musical hero Gene Vincent.

Unlike New Boots..., however, the album was received negatively by the majority of music critics, while other reviewers noted good points to the album. It was a commercial disappointment failing to make the Top 40, and the album's only single, "Spasticus Autisticus", failed to chart in the UK.

== Composition and recording ==
=== Background ===
Island Records' founder Chris Blackwell suggested that Dury and Chas Jankel (who had returned from America and temporarily buried the hatchet with Dury) fly to Nassau and record with Sly Dunbar and Robbie Shakespeare, the duo who were renowned as both reggae musicians and producers, and were also on Island Records.

However, Dury and Jankel were greatly unprepared and without enough material for a new album, so they wrote much of the album either on the plane or at their destination. The final album was eight tracks long, and both of them were ultimately disappointed with it.

While recording the album Dury and Jankel were mobbed by Jamaican band Smokey, who mistook a line from his hit "Reasons to be Cheerful, Part 3" to be about them. The reference to "sing-alonga Smokey" was actually about Smokey Robinson. Dury politely agreed to listen to their new album while his co-writer sneaked away.

Beside "Spasticus", another noteworthy track appears on the album; "Girls (Watching)" is the only officially released cover version Ian Dury recorded; it was written by Sly Dunbar. However, MP3s of Dury, performing the Stranglers single "Peaches" and "Bear Cage" live, along with Hazel O'Connor and members of the Stranglers can be found on some download services. As well as being found on two Stranglers live albums And Then There Was Three and The Stranglers and Friends – Live in Concert both CDs are of the same gig, when Hugh Cornwell was in prison, various artists including Dury took turns to sing.

Dury himself later admitted that the only track he would have listened to again was "Spasticus". Chas Jankel was a little kinder and continues to praise "Lonely (Town)" as an underrated gem on the album. "The (Body Song)" and "Funky Disco (Pops)" are the tracks most currently selected for greatest hits compilations (along with "Spasticus").

== Critical reception ==
Professional ratings
Review scores
Source	Rating
AllMusic	2.5/5 stars
Robert Christgau	B−
Daily Express	2/5 stars
Record Mirror	4/5 stars

Lord Upminster received negative reviews from contemporary music critics.

In a contemporary review music critic Robert Christgau gave the album a "B−" and panned that "Spasticus Autisticus is every bit as startling as Dury must have hoped after Laughter got lost in the hustle" but added that "I suppose the idea is to let the riddims of Steve Stanley, Chaz Jankel, and Sly & Robbie turn jingles into rallying cries"

=== Retrospective reviews ===
In a retrospective review, Stephen Thomas Erlewine of AllMusic wrote that "Lord Upminster turned out to be a set of uninspired funk that lacks the joyful energy of his three previous records." Emma Greatrex of the Daily Express gave the album two stars writing that the album was "largely overlooked", but also noted that "many of the songs are repetitive and indistinguishable from each other".

== Track listing ==
All songs written and composed by Ian Dury and Chas Jankel, except where noted.

=== UK edition ===
Side one
No.	Title	Writer(s)	Length
1.	"Funky Disco (Pops)"		3:30
2.	"Red (Letter)"		3:47
3.	"Girls (Watching)"	Sly Dunbar	4:28
4.	"Wait (For Me)"		3:41

Side two
No.	Title	Length
5.	"The (Body Song)"	5:08
6.	"Lonely (Town)"	4:10
7.	"Trust (Is A Must)"	6:20
8.	"Spasticus (Autisticus)"	4:57

=== US edition ===
Side one
No.	Title	Length
1.	"Spasticus (Autisticus)"	4:57
2.	"Red (Letter)"	3:47
3.	"The (Body Song)"	5:08
4.	"Lonely (Town)"	4:10

Side two
No.	Title	Writer(s)	Length
5.	"Trust (Is a Must)"		6:20
6.	"Funky Disco (Pops)"		3:30
7.	"Girls (Watching)"	Dunbar	4:28
8.	"Wait (For Me)"		3:41

2013 reissue bonus tracks
No.	Title	Writer(s)	Origin	Length
9.	"Spasticus (Autisticus)" (Version) (as the Seven Seas Players)		"Spasticus Autisticus" 12"	7:01
10.	"Johnny Funk" (Master Mix)		Previously unreleased	3:45
11.	"Johnny Funk" (New Lead Vox)		Previously unreleased	5:54
12.	"Rock N Roll Shoes" (Mix 4)	Chuck Willis	Previously unreleased	2:22
13.	"Polydor Conference 1981 Interview"	N/A	Previously unreleased	20:37
Total length:				78:15

Notes

- Some compilations mistakenly do not use parts of the song titles that are in brackets (especially "Spasticus"), it is a 'theme' of the titles on the album and all of them do have words in brackets as shown above.

== Personnel ==
- Ian Dury – vocals
- Chas Jankel – guitar, keyboards, backing vocals, arrangements
- Robbie Shakespeare – bass guitar, arrangements
- Sly Dunbar – drums, arrangements
- Tyrone Downie – Clavinets, Prophet-5, Steinway & Sons pianos, backing vocals
- Tina Weymouth – backing vocals
- Laura Weymouth – backing vocals
- Harold Dorsett – backing vocals
- Gina – backing vocals

Technical

- Ian Dury – production
- Chas Jankel – production
- Steven Stanley – production, engineering, mixing
- Harold Dorsett – engineering, assistant mixing
- Paul Kaye – cover photography

== Charts ==
Chart performance for Lord Upminster
Chart	Peak position	Total weeks
Swedish Albums Chart	32	1
UK Albums Chart	53	4

== Release history ==
Release history and formats for Lord Upminster
Territory	Release date	Format	Label	Cat. no.
Europe	September 1981	Vinyl, cassette	Polydor	2383 617/POLD 5042
United States	November 1981	Vinyl, cassette	Polydor	PD-1-6337/2383 617
Yugoslavia	1982	Vinyl, cassette	PGP-RTB	2220946
United Kingdom	December 1989	CD	Great Expectations	PIPCD 005
Japan	25 July 2007	CD	Universal	UICY-93269
United Kingdom	3 June 2015	CD	Salvo	SALVOCD056

== Sources ==
- Sex and Drugs and Rock and Roll: The Life of Ian Dury by Richard Balls, first published 2000, Omnibus Press
- Ian Dury & The Blockheads: Song By Song by Jim Drury, first published 2003, Sanctuary Publishing.
- On My Life BBC2 Documentary first broadcast 25 September 1999
