= Spasticus Autisticus =

Single by Ian Dury

from the album Lord Upminster
- B-side: "Instrumental Version"
- Released: 1981
- Recorded: April–May 1981
- Studio: Compass Point Studios (Bahamas)
- Genre: Post-punk; new wave; post-disco
- Length: 5:00
- Label: Polydor
- Songwriters: Ian Dury; Chas Jankel
- Producers: Jankel; Dury

Ian Dury singles chronology
| "Sueperman's Big Sister" (1980) | "Spasticus Autisticus" (1981) | ""Really Glad You Came"" (1983) |

Official audio
- "Spasticus Autisticus" (Live) on YouTube

"Spasticus Autisticus" is a song written by Ian Dury and co-written by Chaz Jankel, released both as a single and on Dury's second solo studio album Lord Upminster (1981).

== History and ban by the BBC ==
"Spasticus Autisticus" was written in 1981 as a protest against the International Year of Disabled Persons, which Dury considered to be patronising. Dury was himself disabled by polio contracted in his youth. Fed up with repeated requests to get involved with charitable causes, Dury wrote an "anti-charity" song.

The song was a cross between a battle cry and an appeal for understanding: "Hello to you out there in normal land. You may not comprehend my tale or understand." The repeated refrain "I'm Spasticus, I'm Spasticus, I'm Spasticus Autisticus" made explicit reference to the line "I'm Spartacus" from the 1960 film Spartacus. Dury had been considering touring under the name "Spastic and the Autistics", playing on his disability and the term "blockhead", before his friend Ed Speight suggested: "No, it should be Spasticus Autisticus - he's the freed slave of the disabled."

The title and lyrics were deliberately provocative, as the word spastic, a name for people with cerebral palsy and then used as the title for the charitable Spastics Society (now known as Scope), was becoming taboo in Britain due to its use as a derogatory term. The BBC deemed the lyrics offensive ("I dribble when I piddle 'cos my middle is a riddle") and along with other radio stations denied it airplay. The record also received little promotion from the record company Polydor.

The song was performed live on television and broadcast worldwide during the opening ceremony of the 2012 Summer Paralympics, by Orbital and members of the Graeae Theatre Company.

== Personnel ==
- Ian Dury – vocals
- Chaz Jankel – guitars, keyboards, backing vocals, arrangements
- Robbie Shakespeare – bass guitars, arrangements
- Sly Dunbar – drums, arrangements
- Tyrone Downie – clavinets, Prophet-5, Steinway & Sons pianos, backing vocals
- Tina Weymouth – backing vocals
- Laura Weymouth – backing vocals
- Harold Dorsett – backing vocals
- Gina – backing vocals
