= 4,000 Weeks' Holiday =

Studio album by Ian Dury
- Released: 27 January 1984
- Recorded: 1983
- Genre: Disco; funk
- Length: 37:40
- Label: Polydor
- Producer: Adam Kidron

Ian Dury chronology
Lord Upminster (1981)	4,000 Weeks' Holiday (1984)	Apples (1989)

Singles from 4,000 Weeks' Holiday
- 1. "Really Glad You Came" Released: November 1983; 2. "Very Personal" Released: February 1984

Professional ratings
Review scores
Source	Rating
AllMusic	2/5 stars
Robert Christgau	B+

4,000 Weeks' Holiday is a studio album by Ian Dury and the Music Students, released on 27 January 1984 by Polydor Records. It is Dury's only studio album with the Music Students and his fifth overall (including releases with the Blockheads).

== Production and printings ==
Its title is a reference to the length of an average human lifespan (4000 weeks). In 1984 Ian Dury was an official face for the Campaign for Nuclear Disarmament (CND) in Britain and went so far as to shave its symbol, the peace sign, into his hair. This can be seen on both the cover to the album and on the "Ban the Bomb" single. The album's song credits and lyrics are hand written. Accompanying each song's information are strange catchphrases such as "when flies fly, flies fly behind flies", "a gaudy morning bodes a wet afternoon" and most bizarre of all "my, how we apples swim quoth the dogshit".

4,000 Weeks Holiday was not reissued on CD in the UK until 2013, but was released in that format in Japan in 2007.

== History ==
If accounts by Dury himself and Music Student member Merlin Rhys-Jones (who would continue to work with Dury and co-write songs with him until his death) from Sex and Drugs and Rock and Roll: The Life of Ian Dury are correct, it would appear that it was Polydor Records who suggested and insisted on Dury working with young musicians. Contradictorily, Ian Dury & the Blockheads: Song by Song purports that Polydor had wanted the Blockheads to play on the album, with the group rejecting the idea after learning they wouldn't be paid due to Dury spending most of his advance on his previous solo effort Lord Upminster (1981). Song by Song's account is corroborated by Norman Watt-Roy (bassist for the Blockheads). Both versions are questionable. (source?)

Chaz Jankel, Dury's primary songwriting partner, was busy with his solo career in America and with no Blockheads present, Dury turned to his old songwriting partner from his pub rock days Russell Hardy (and another Rod Melvin it would seem), and worked with a young American songwriter/multi-instrumentalist Michael McEvoy, who had been introduced to him by Blockheads and Kilburn and the High Roads member Davey Payne after McEvoy had played on the saxophonist's solo album for Stiff Records. Adam Kidron, who had produced Payne's album, had hired McEvoy as on a number of projects (including Orange Juice's debut album and Scritti Politti's Songs to Remember) which he produced before 4000 Weeks Holiday.

Rehearsals for the album began in 1982 in Hammersmith, London, not very far from Dury's current flat in luxurious Thames-side apartments, and was recorded the following year in Basing Street Studios, Notting Hill and later The Townhouse. Though Jankel did not write any of the songs, he did play lead guitar as a guest. Ed Speight and Geoff Castle, who had played on Dury's seminal New Boots and Panties!! LP in 1977, guested on guitar and Moog synthesizer. The sessions also featured an extra special guest, celebrated reggae/ska trombone player Rico Rodriguez MBE (known to UK youth from the Specials), but most of the recordings were performed by the 'Music Students', i.e. McEvoy, Rhys-Jones, drummer Tag Lamche and saxophonist Jamie Talbot. Critically the album is often considered the weakest of Dury's output.

Dury was forced by Polydor to remove one of the album's stronger (and controversial) songs "Fuck off Noddy" (and another about Billy Butlin) because of high-profile paedophile and child pornography cases at the time (there was also rumours of a proposed lawsuit by the estate of Enid Blyton). The song puts down children's television and contained such lines as:

Winnie-the-Pooh is having a wank
And what are you up to? Said Tommy the Tank

And

Fuck off Noddy you stupid prat
Fuck off Noddy in your rotten hat

Dury was determined not to cut the song (an illegal MP3 can be found on some download services) and arguments about it delayed the record's release for over half a year. The single "Really Glad You Came / (You're My) Inspiration" was released during that time, the songs were two different lyrics put to an almost identical tune (by McEvoy) and the single was a total failure (though these are the two tracks most often used on Greatest Hits compilations) and its follow up single "Ban the Bomb / Very Personal" was actually mocked by critics, the first time this had happened to Ian Dury in his career thus far. Despite heavy promotion and touring by Ian Dury and the Music Students, including a week's residency in Tel Aviv, Israel and an appearance on influential music show The Tube the album's sales were poor, though the album reached number 54 in the UK Album Charts.

The album also contains a noteworthy track: "Peter the Painter" was written (with McEvoy) on request from British Pop artist Peter Blake, Blake had been Dury's teacher at London's Royal College of Art and the two remained good friends until Dury's death in 2000. Blake was having his own exhibition at The Tate Gallery, London and asked Dury to compose a theme tune for it. "Peter the Painter" was that theme tune.

== Track listing ==
Side 1
No.	Title	Writer(s)	Length
1.	"(You're My) Inspiration"	Ian Dury, Michael McEvoy	4:15
2.	"Friends"	Dury, Russell Hardy	2:57
3.	"Tell Your Daddy"	Dury, Rod Melvin	2:47
4.	"Peter the Painter"	Dury, McEvoy	3:54
5.	"Ban the Bomb"	Dury, Hardy	4:20

Side 2
No.	Title	Writer(s)	Length
1.	"Percy the Poet"	Dury, McEvoy	3:28
2.	"Very Personal"	Dury, Hardy	3:55
3.	"Take Me to the Cleaners"	Dury, McEvoy	2:37
4.	"The Man With No Face"	Dury, Hardy	4:48
5.	"Really Glad You Came"	Dury, McEvoy	4:36

Original proposed 1983 track list

Side 1
No.	Title	Writer(s)	Length
1.	"Take Me to the Cleaners"	Dury, McEvoy	2:37
2.	"Friends"	Dury, Hardy	2:57
3.	"Tell Your Daddy"	Dury, Melvin	2:47
4.	"Peter the Painter"	Dury, McEvoy	3:54
5.	"Ban the Bomb"	Dury, Hardy	4:20

Side 2
No.	Title	Writer(s)	Length
1.	"Percy the Poet"	Dury, McEvoy	3:28
2.	"Very Personal"	Dury, Hardy	3:55
3.	"Noddy Harris"	Dury, Hardy	2:55
4.	"The Man With No Face"	Dury, Hardy	4:48
5.	"Really Glad You Came"	Dury, McEvoy	4:36

2013 reissue bonus tracks

No.	Title	Writer(s)	Origin	Length
11.	"The Sky's the Limit"	Dury, Hardy	B-side of "Very Personal" 12"	3:36
12.	"You're My Inspiration" (long version)	Dury, McEvoy	Previously unreleased	5:19
13.	"Peter the Painter" (long version)	Dury, McEvoy	Previously unreleased	5:03
14.	"I Weighed Myself Up"	Dury, McEvoy	Previously unreleased	4:08
15.	"I Weighed Myself Up" (Trident 1 March 1983 – long version)	Dury, McEvoy	Previously unreleased	4:50
16.	"Percy the Poet" (full version)	Dury, McEvoy	Previously unreleased	5:28

== Personnel ==
Credits adapted from the album's liner notes.

Ian Dury and the Music Students

- Ian Dury – vocals (credited by the pseudonym 'D. Poundcake' on "Peter the Painter")
- Michael McEvoy – bass, keyboards, synthesizers, brass arranger, lead guitar on "Tell Your Daddy" and "Take Me to the Cleaners", drums on "Tell Your Daddy"
- Merlin Rhys-Jones – guitar
- Tag Lamche – drums, percussion on "Friends"
- Ray Cooper – percussion
- Jamie Talbot – saxophones, clarinet on "The Man with No Face"

Additional personnel

- Steve Sidwell – trumpet
- Neil Sidwell – trombone
- Geoff Castle – synthesisers
- Rod Melvin – piano and backing vocals on "Tell Your Daddy"
- Chaz Jankel – lead guitar on "Percy the Poet"
- Ed Speight – lead guitar on "Ban the Bomb", "Take Me to the Cleaners" and "Really Glad You Came"
- Chris Taylor – drums on "Peter the Painter"
- Rico Rodriguez – trombone on "Friends"
- Davey Payne – saxophones on "Peter the Painter"
- Duncan Hornking – French horn on "The Man with No Face"
- Jackie Challenor, Lorenza Johnson, Mae McKenna, Humphrey Dorsett, Andy Fairweather-Low – backing vocals

Technical

- Adam Kidron – producer
- Alan Douglas – engineer
- Keith Nixon – assistant engineer
- Barney Bubbles – design
- Bob Bromide – photography

== Release history ==
Label	Cat. No.		Format	Date
Polydor	815 327-1/POLD 5112	^{EU}	Vinyl, Cassette	27 January 1984
Great Expectations	PIPCD 004	^{FR}	CD	December 1989
Universal	UICY-93270	^{JP}	CD	25 July 2007
Salvo	SALVOCD057	^{UK}	CD	3 June 2013

== Sources ==
- Sex and Drugs and Rock and Roll: The Life of Ian Dury by Richard Balls, first published 2000, Omnibus Press
- Ian Dury & The Blockheads: Song By Song by Jim Drury, first published 2003, Sanctuary Publishing
