= Sueperman's Big Sister =

1980 song performed by Ian Dury

Single by Ian Dury & The Blockheads

from the album Laughter
- B-side: "You'll See Glimpses"
- Released: October 1980
- Genre: New wave
- Length: 2:48
- Label: Stiff
- Songwriters: Ian Dury, Wilko Johnson

Ian Dury singles chronology
"I Want to Be Straight" (1980)	"Sueperman's Big Sister" (1980)	"Spasticus Autisticus" (1981)

"Sueperman's Big Sister" is a song and a 1980 single by Ian Dury & The Blockheads. Its title purposefully misspells 'Superman' with an extra 'e' to avoid any copyright issues with DC Comics.

Released as a single (BUY 100) to promote Ian Dury & The Blockheads upcoming album Laughter, it was a commercial failure, reaching 51 in the UK Singles Chart, but the Sueperman's Big Sister / You'll See Glimpses 7" single has the added significance of being Stiff Records' 100th Single. To mark this occasion the record had special labels printed. These labels were copies of Stiff's first single Nick Lowe's "So It Goes" / "Heart Of The City", that had been adjusted as if by someone writing on them with biro or black marker all of the information from the sticker is crossed out, and replaced with the correct information for the single (i.e. "So It Goes" is crossed out and "Sueperman's Big Sister" is written by it).

The inspiration behind the song is supposedly a picture of a 'Teddy Girl' (a female counterpart for Teddy Boys), possibly the same image used for the single's sleeve, and its lyric tells the story of a chauvinistic, cocky man whose ideas on the opposite sex are radically changed by a relationship with a woman so imposing she could well be 'superman's big sister'. At one point she is so rough/domineering with him he even considers homosexuality ('if I'd gone on the turn dear') the two eventually break-up but remain friends, according to the song's narrator, for fear of repercussions if they did not.

Ironically Ian Dury, who wrote the song's lyrics, as he would with every song he would release bar one, had been falsely accused of misogyny two years earlier because of the track "If I Was With A Woman", a song appearing on his solo debut New Boots and Panties!! in contrast "Sueperman's Big Sister" gives an anti-misogyny/pro-Woman's Liberation message. With its narrator who thinks that 'a bit of treatment' (sex) is all that's needed is shown the error of his ways by a dominant, independent woman.

The song is co-written by Wilko Johnson, formerly of influential pub-rock band Dr. Feelgood, who had joined the band as a replacement for Ian Dury's former co-writer Chas Jankel, who had left to pursue a solo career, and features string arrangements by Ivor Raymonde (who also composed the string arrangements for "Fucking Ada", the song's B-side on its 12" release).

== Sources ==
- Sex And Drugs And Rock And Roll: The Life Of Ian Dury by Richard Balls, first published 2000, Omnibus Press
- Ian Dury & The Blockheads: Song By Song by Jim Drury, first published 2003, Sanctuary Publishing.
