= Wilko Johnson =

English musician (1947–2022)

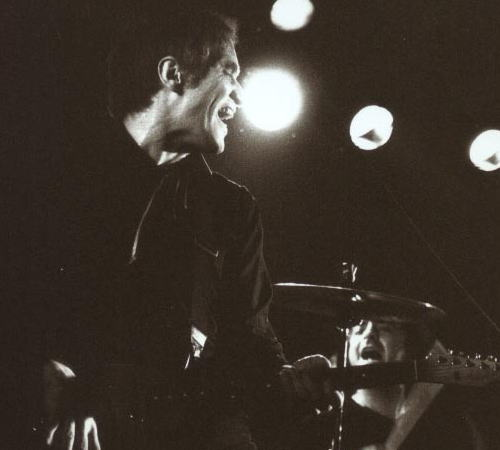

Background information
- Born: John Andrew Wilkinson; 12 July 1947; Canvey Island, Essex, England
- Died: 21 November 2022 (aged 75) Westcliff-on-Sea, Essex, England
- Genres: Rock; pub rock; rhythm and blues; proto-punk
- Occupations: Musician; actor; guitarist; songwriter
- Instruments: Guitar; vocals; piano
- Years active: 1970–2022
- Label: United Artists
- Formerly of: Dr. Feelgood; The Blockheads
- Website: wilkojohnson.com

John Andrew Wilkinson (12 July 1947 – 21 November 2022), better known by the stage name Wilko Johnson, was an English guitarist, singer, songwriter and occasional actor. He was a member of the pub rock/rhythm and blues band Dr. Feelgood in the 1970s. Johnson was known for his distinctive guitar playing style, which he achieved by not using a plectrum but playing fingerstyle. This enabled him to play rhythm guitar and riffs or solos at the same time creating a highly percussive guitar sound.

Johnson and Dr. Feelgood were an influence on the English punk movement. Paul Weller said of Johnson: "Wilko may not be as famous as some other guitarists, but he's right up there. And there are a lot of people who'll say the same. I can hear Wilko in lots of places. It's some legacy."

In 2011 and 2012 he appeared in the HBO fantasy series Game of Thrones, as the mute executioner Ser Ilyn Payne.

== Career ==
=== Music career ===
Born on 12 July 1947 in Canvey Island, Essex, Johnson went to Westcliff High School for Boys and played in several local groups, before attending Newcastle University to study for a BA in English Language and Literature. His undergraduate courses included Anglo-Saxon and ancient Icelandic sagas.

After graduating, he travelled overland to India before returning to Essex to play with the Pigboy Charlie Band. The band evolved into Dr. Feelgood – a mainstay of the 1970s pub rock movement. After returning from Goa, he worked in 1972 as an English teacher. It was then that he adopted the stage name Wilko Johnson, a close anagram of John Wilkinson.

In 1965 Johnson bought his first Fender Telecaster guitar from a shop in Southend, Essex, for £90 (equivalent to £1,501 in 2025). He later played a vintage 1962 Fender Telecaster with rosewood fingerboard which he bought in 1974, shortly after Dr. Feelgood signed their first record deal.

Johnson developed his own image, coupling jerky movements on stage, his so-called "duck walk" (inherited from Chuck Berry), with a choppy guitar style, occasionally raising his guitar to his shoulder like a gun, and a novel dress sense: he favoured a black suit and a pudding bowl haircut. He achieved his playing style by not using a pick but instead relying on fingerstyle. This enabled him to play rhythm guitar and riffs or solos at the same time creating a highly percussive guitar sound. It evolved from a failed attempt to copy Mick Green of Johnny Kidd & the Pirates, a guitarist whom Johnson greatly admired. His Bo Diddley-influenced style formed the essential driving force behind Dr. Feelgood during their initial years, including the band's first four albums, Down by the Jetty, Malpractice, Stupidity, and Sneakin' Suspicion, all released between 1975 and 1977.

The live album, Stupidity, reached number one in the UK Albums Chart, but although Johnson played on Dr. Feelgood's first five single releases, including "Roxette" and "Back in the Night", the only single to chart during his membership of the band was "Sneakin' Suspicion". He left the band in April 1977, following disagreements over the tracks to be included in the Sneakin' Suspicion album. The remaining band members claimed that Johnson had left voluntarily. But Johnson subsequently insisted: "I didn't leave, they threw me out and then told the newspapers that I'd left."

In 1977, he was a founding member of Solid Senders, with keyboardist John Potter, bassist Steve Lewins, and drummer Alan Platt. They signed to Virgin in 1978 and released the album, Solid Senders that year. The Wilko Johnson Band played at the 'Front Row Festival', a three-week event at the Hope and Anchor, Islington in late November and early December 1977, featuring many early punk rock acts. This resulted in the inclusion of two tracks by The Wilko Johnson Band ("Dr. Feelgood" and "Twenty Yards Behind"), on a hit double album of recordings from the festival. The Hope & Anchor Front Row Festival compilation album (March 1978) which reached number 28 in the UK Albums Chart.

In 1980, Johnson joined Ian Dury's band, the Blockheads. Around 1984 he then re-formed The Wilko Johnson Band, joined by Blockhead bassist Norman Watt-Roy and Italian born drummer Salvatore Ramundo. 'Sav' Ramundo left the band in June 1999 and was replaced by Steve Monti (future Curve and the Jesus and Mary Chain drummer). Johnson's second album, Ice on the Motorway, was released in 1981, and his EP "Bottle Up and Go!" with Lew Lewis followed in 1983. Several albums were released on European labels over the next decade. In 1992, Johnson appeared at the Eurockéennes music festival, and the following year at GuilFest. The album Going Back Home appeared on the Chess label in 1998. He began to cut back on his concert appearances in 1999, and released the album Don't Let Your Daddy Know (Live in Japan 2000) the following year.

The studio album Red Hot Rocking Blues was released in 2005; this contained covers of classics by the likes of Van Morrison, Bob Dylan, Ray Charles, Sonny Boy Williamson, and Lead Belly. Throughout 2005 and 2006 the band teamed up with the Hamsters and John Otway to take part in 'The Mad, the Bad & the Dangerous' tour.

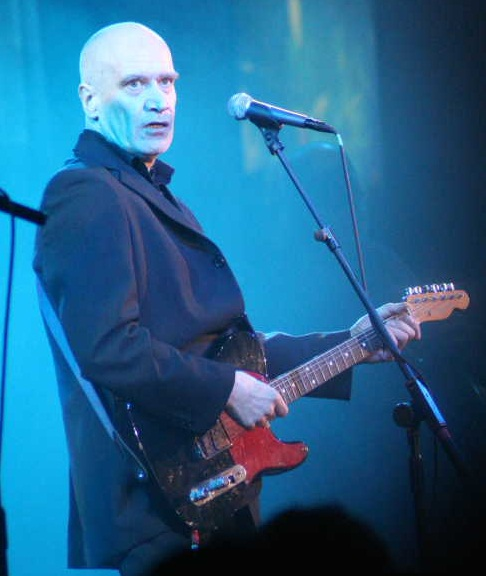
Johnson at Rock`n`Blues Jan 2008, Butlins Skegness

Johnson appeared in the Julien Temple-directed documentary film Oil City Confidential (2009), where he related his memories of Canvey Island and Dr. Feelgood. The reviewer Philip French described Johnson as "a wild man, off stage and on, funny, eloquent and charismatic", while Temple described Johnson as "an extraordinary man – one of the great English eccentrics". Reviewing the film for The Guardian, Peter Bradshaw called it "the best rockumentary yet" and said that "the most likeable thing about this very likeable film is the way it promotes Wilko Johnson as a 100–1 shot for the title of Greatest Living Englishman".

On 2 October 2010, it was announced that Johnson was to support the Stranglers on their 'Black & Blue' UK tour starting in March 2011. In April 2011, he played several sold-out shows as part of the Kilkenny Rhythm & Roots Festival in Ireland.

Johnson published his autobiography, co-authored with Zoë Howe and titled Looking Back at Me, at the end of May 2012. He appeared in the BBC4 documentaries Evidently... John Cooper Clarke and Punk Britannia in May 2012. On 24 August 2012, Johnson and his band were due to headline the Blues stage at Rhythm Festival, but the festival was cancelled on 3 August due to poor ticket sales.

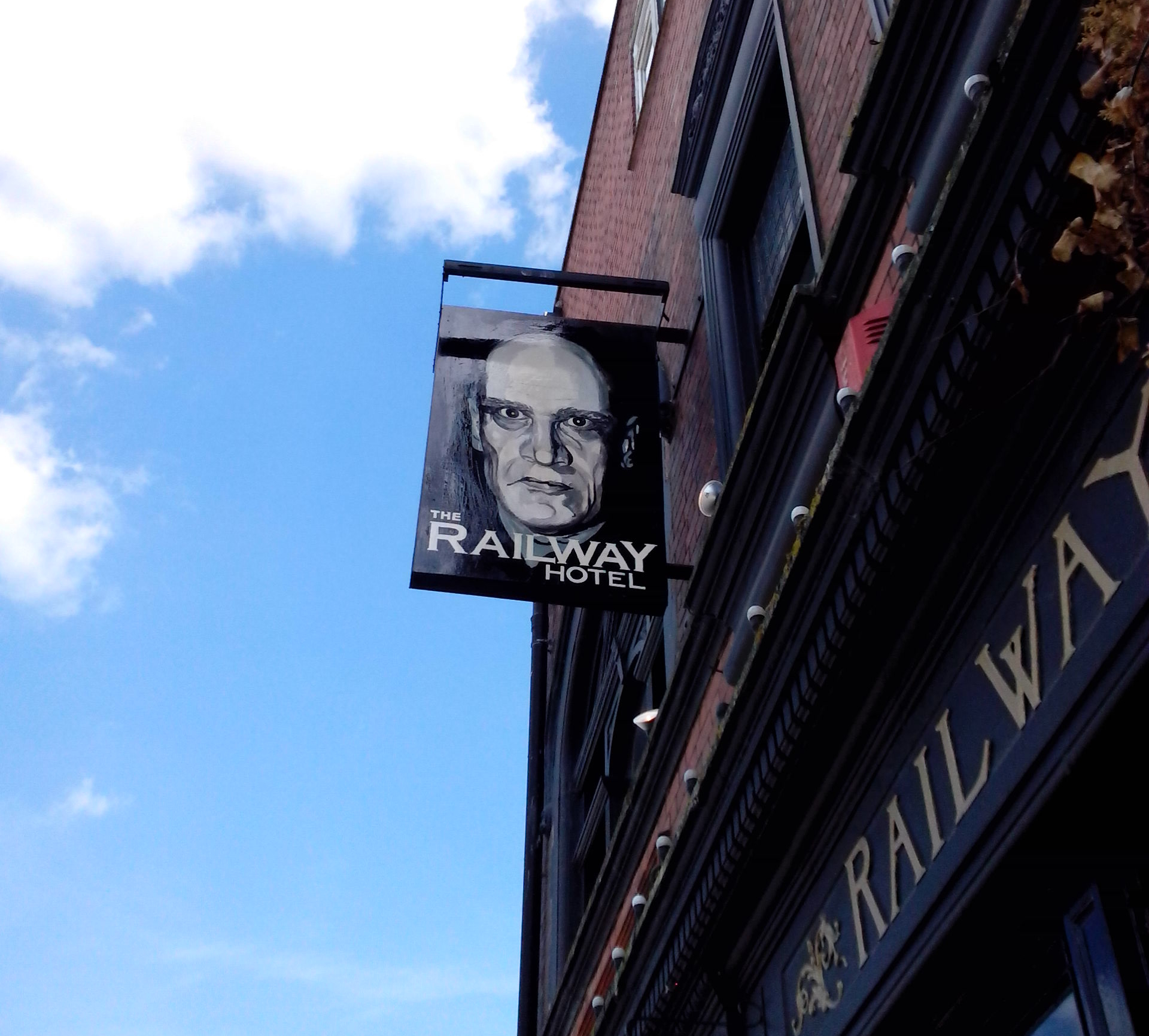
Railway Hotel, Southend-on-Sea, pub sign featuring portrait of Wilko Johnson

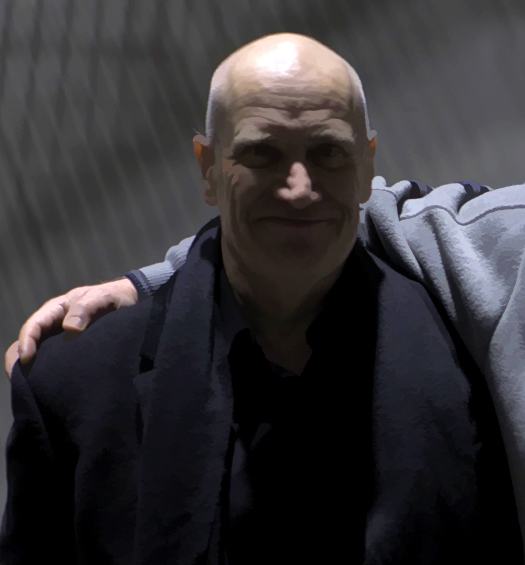
Johnson in 2014

Johnson stated in early 2013 that he had terminal cancer, and announced he was going on a farewell tour. On 22 March 2013, he played what was announced as his final show guesting with Madness on the television programme Madness Live: Goodbye Television Centre which was broadcast on BBC Four. Afterwards he stated that he would not be able to perform his two final homecoming shows at Canvey Island due to ill health and would not be performing again.

However, on 13 July 2013, he performed an unannounced hour-long live set with Norman Watt-Roy and Dylan Howe at the Village Green Festival in his home town of Westcliff-on-Sea. In addition, he occasionally performed informal unannounced sets at his local pub, the Railway Hotel in Southend. In July 2013, the pub replaced their sign with a portrait of him painted by local artist Jack Melville, in honour of his long-term support of the south-east Essex music scene.

Johnson also played a set on the final night at Wickham Festival in Hampshire on Sunday 4 August 2013, where he was invited by the Blockheads on stage to play a song. Johnson announced a further tour with Howe and Watt-Roy during the spring of 2014.

In March and April 2014, Wilko, together with Watt-Roy and Howe, appeared on several UK dates as support to the "Frantic Four" (the classic line-up of Status Quo on what was billed as their last ever tour). In September 2014, after a meeting in Southend-on-Sea with Alan McGee, who described Wilko as "one of his all time heroes, and a national treasure", Wilko signed to Creation Management. He performed "All Through the City" and "Going Back Home", with his classic duckwalk, at Jools Holland's annual Hootenanny for New Year, 2014–15.

==== Later career, cancer and death ====
Johnson was forced to cancel a show in November 2012 when he was rushed to hospital with an undisclosed ailment. He was diagnosed in January 2013 with late stage pancreatic cancer, and elected not to receive any chemotherapy.

On 25 January 2013, he gave an interview to John Wilson on the BBC Radio 4 arts programme Front Row. He discussed his cancer and said doctors had told him he had nine or ten months to live. He also talked about his "farewell tour" of the UK set for March and how his diagnosis had made him feel "vividly alive". After the tour was over, he announced he would spend his final days recording a farewell album with The Who's lead singer Roger Daltrey. The album, Going Back Home, was released in March 2014. "I thought that was going to be the last thing I ever did", he later told BBC News entertainment correspondent Colin Paterson in October 2014. According to Variety, "The album, rather shockingly, proved the most commercially successful recording for either collaborator in more than 30 years."

However, Johnson did not have the more common adenocarcinoma of the pancreas. It was later discovered that he had a pancreatic neuroendocrine tumour (PanNET), a less aggressive and more treatable form of the disease. Johnson underwent radical surgery to treat his illness, and the doctors were hopeful that his prognosis would be good. At the Q Awards on 22 October 2014, Johnson accepted the "Icon Award" and announced that he was "cancer-free" having undergone "removal of his pancreas, spleen, part of his stomach, small and large intestines and the removal and reconstruction of blood vessels relating to the liver". Johnson said: "It was an 11-hour operation… This tumour weighed 3kg – that's the size of a baby! Anyway, they got it all. They cured me. It's so weird and so strange that it's kind of hard to come to terms with it in my mind. Now, I'm spending my time gradually coming to terms with the idea that my death is not imminent, that I am going to live on". He added that he was still recovering from the operation and when asked what he would do next replied: "I don't know really".

In 2015, Julien Temple released his second documentary about Johnson, The Ecstasy of Wilko Johnson, which featured Johnson’s tour of Japan and his album with Roger Daltrey. The film records Johnson’s successful medical treatment and coming to terms with the fact that he did not have terminal cancer. Variety reviewed the film: "Julien Temple’s characteristically playful, pop-culture savvy approach to the documentary form might seem ill-suited to the subject of mortality, but veteran English axman Johnson’s unexpectedly buoyant response to very bad news makes for a film about saying goodbye that is itself void of grief, fear or regret."

In 2016 he received an Honorary Doctor of Arts award at Anglia Ruskin University in a ceremony at Cambridge Corn Exchange.

Johnson died on 21 November 2022, at his home in Westcliff-on-Sea, at the age of 75. Following the announcement of Johnson's death, Billy Bragg said, "His guitar playing was angry and angular, but his presence – twitchy, confrontational, out of control – was something we'd never beheld before in UK pop. Rotten, Strummer and Weller learned a lot from his edgy demeanour." Alex Kapranos, lead singer of Franz Ferdinand said, "His unique, wired playing & stage presence thrilled & inspired many guitarists, myself included." Broadcaster Bob Harris said "Wilko was absolutely unique. His energy and spirit were incredible."

=== Acting career ===
For his acting debut, Johnson was cast in the role of mute executioner Ser Ilyn Payne, in both the first and second season of the HBO fantasy series Game of Thrones, from April 2011, after the producers had seen him in Oil City Confidential. He related that "'They said they wanted somebody really sinister who went around looking daggers at people before killing them. That made it easy. Looking daggers at people is what I do all the time, it's like second nature to me'." He appeared in four episodes.

== Personal life ==
Johnson lived in Westcliff-on-Sea, Essex. He married his childhood sweetheart Irene Knight when they were teenagers, and the couple had two sons, Matthew and Simon. Johnson was widowed in 2004 after his wife's death from cancer. He was interested in astronomy, painting and poetry. Johnson's son Simon is also a guitarist, playing in Southend-based band Eight Rounds Rapid.

He was involved in politics as a student at Newcastle University, and had been a member of the Young Communist League before university.

== Legacy ==
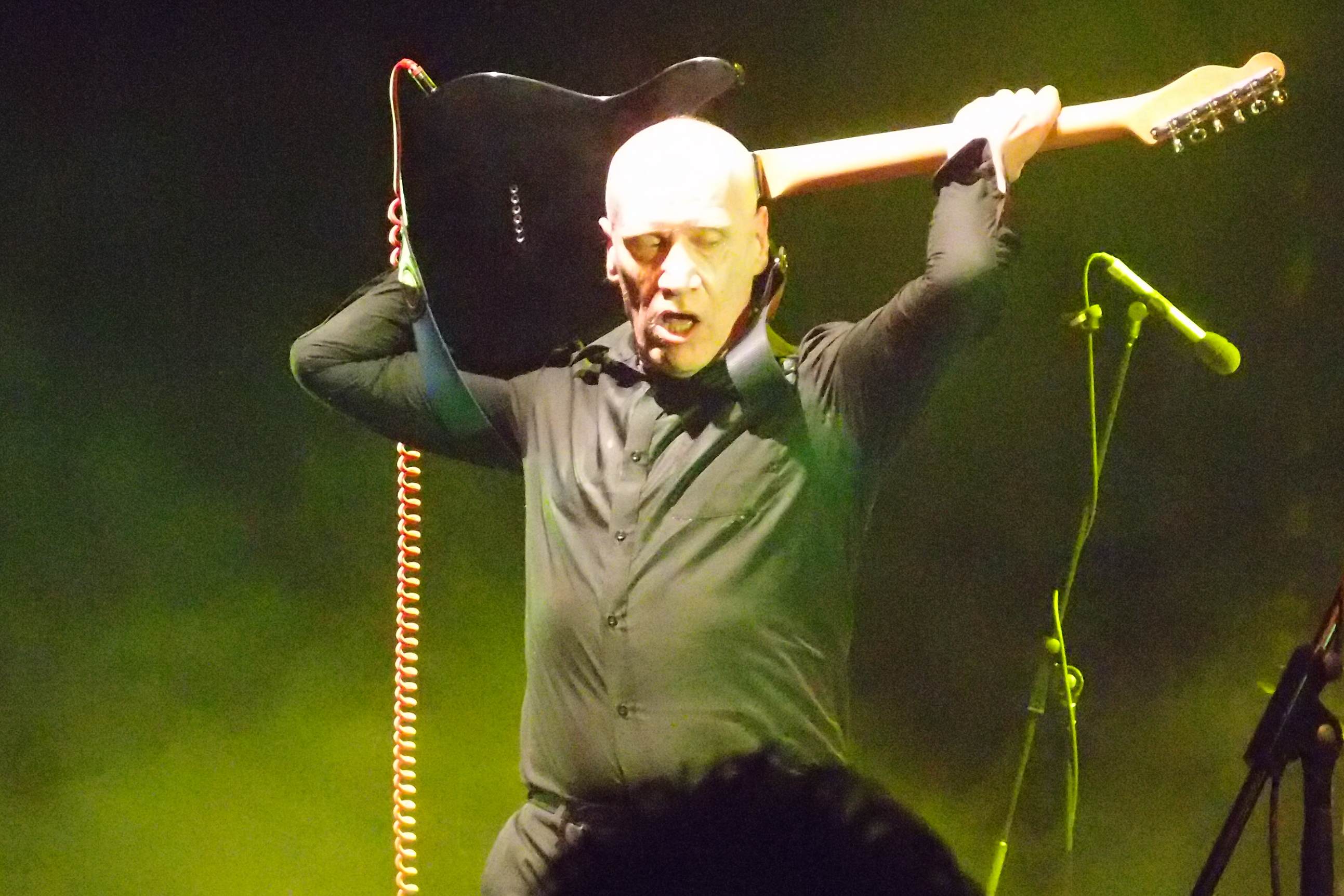
Johnson in 2012 at the Waterside Arts Centre in Sale

Johnson's musical style underpinned the early years of Dr. Feelgood. His style has been cited as one of the founding influences of the British punk movement. Jean-Jacques Burnel of The Stranglers says "I often say to journalists there is a bridge between the old times and the punk times. That bridge is exclusively the Feelgoods, it allowed us to go from one thing to another. That's the connection, the DNA." This influence was explored in the 2009 documentary about Dr. Feelgood, Oil City Confidential. Reviewing Johnson's autobiography, Mark Blake of Q magazine said "In the mid-70s the band's brutish R&B and their guitarist's eye-popping thousand-yard stare inspired a young John Lydon, Paul Weller, and Suggs from Madness. Looking Back at Me secures the man born John Wilkinson's reputation as one of British rock's most unique characters. Wilko recalls his childhood on Canvey Island and how he followed the '60s hippy trail to Goa ... before helping invent punk with Dr Feelgood." The BBC4 three-part documentary series Punk Britannia, first aired in May 2012, also stressed the importance of Dr. Feelgood as "pub rockers, a generation of bands sandwiched between 60s hippies and mid-70s punks who will help pave the way towards the short, sharp shock of punk".

Notable guitarists who have cited Johnson as an influence include Echo & the Bunnymen's Will Sergeant and Gang of Four's Andy Gill.

In February 2017, The Wave Pictures released a vinyl EP titled Canvey Island Baby, which featured five covers of Johnson-penned tracks and an additional song, the title track written by the band's singer/guitarist David Tattersall.

In 2024 the play Wilko by Jonathan Maitland, focusing on Johnson's recovery from cancer, was performed at the Queen's Theatre, Hornchurch, with Johnson Willis in the lead role.

On 9 June 2025 Johnson was honoured by train operator c2c with a train being named after him. The nameplate, reading "Wilko Johnson 1947 – 2022 He did it right", was unveiled by his son Simon Johnson.

== Discography ==
=== Albums and EPs (as a band member) ===
==== Dr. Feelgood ====
- Down by the Jetty (January 1975)
- Malpractice (October 1975) – UK No. 17
- Stupidity (1976) – UK No. 1
- Sneakin' Suspicion (1977) – UK No. 10
- All Through the City (With Wilko 1974–1977) (2012: box set of all four Dr Feelgood albums Johnson wrote and played on plus unreleased material, "much of it garnered from Wilko's understairs cupboard.")

==== Solid Senders ====
- Solid Senders (1978) – AUS 79

==== The Wilko Johnson Band (selected) ====
- Ice on the Motorway (1981)
- Pull the Cover (1984)
- Call It What You Want (1987)
- Barbed Wire Blues (1988)
- Going Back Home (1998)
- Don't Let Your Daddy Know (Live in Japan 2000) (2000)
- Red Hot Rocking Blues (2005)
- Portobello Shuffle: A Testimonial to Boss Goodman and Tribute to the Deviants & Pink Fairies contribute a cover of The Pink Fairies "Portobello Shuffle" [2010, Easy Action, EARSBOSS001]
- Blow Your Mind (2018)
- The Best of Wilko Johnson (2019, Cadiz Music)

==== Ian Dury & the Blockheads ====
- Laughter (1980)

==== With Roger Daltrey ====
- Going Back Home (2014) UK No. 3
