= Laughter (Ian Dury & The Blockheads album) =

Studio album by Ian Dury and the Blockheads
- Released: 28 November 1980
- Recorded: 1980
- Studios: The Producers Workshop, London
- Genre: Pub rock
- Length: 38:29
- Label: Stiff
- Producers: 'Chips off the Old Block & Crooks' (Ian Dury & the Blockheads)

Ian Dury chronology
Do It Yourself (1978)	Laughter (1980)	Lord Upminster (1981)

Professional ratings
Review scores
Source	Rating
AllMusic	3.5/5 stars
Robert Christgau	B+

Laughter is the third studio album by Ian Dury and the Blockheads; released on 28 November 1980, it was the last studio album Dury made for Stiff Records. It was also the last studio album he made with the Blockheads, until 1998's Mr. Love Pants, though a live album Warts 'n' Audience was produced in 1991.

== History ==
The Blockheads had undergone a significant personnel change since the previous album, Do It Yourself. Chaz Jankel, who played keyboards and guitar, and co-wrote most of that album's songs, had left in the wake of a stressful tour. Jankel's place on guitar was taken by Wilko Johnson of Dr. Feelgood. Johnson had considered retiring from the music business until he was asked by Davey Payne and Dury, old friends from their pub rock days, to join the Blockheads. The new-line up first appeared on the "I Want To Be Straight" single, which was released before the album, and reached number 22 in the UK Singles Chart.

Although Ian Dury was becoming harder to work with, the production of Laughter had started out as a relaxed affair, without the presence of Jankel and Dury. Rehearsals commenced in early 1980 at Milner Sound in Fulham, after keyboard player Mick Gallagher had returned from an American tour with The Clash. The group was, at that time, on hiatus after the gruelling promotional tour in support of Do It Yourself. Spurred on by recording commitments, Dury took over the rehearsals to form the basis of his new album and brought in Wilko Johnson, all without consulting the rest of the band.

At that time Dury was an alcoholic, and also addicted to Mogadon, a brand of sedative. Coupled with his bad reaction to celebrity, and his bouts of depression, these addictions caused him to be cantankerous, confrontational, argumentative and controlling. Although these traits had come out during the recording of the group's previous album, they were at their peak during the record sessions for Laughter. Attempts to question Dury's judgment would cause explosions of defensiveness and aggression. He also insisted on synchronising the instruments to a click-track, which aggravated a number of the musicians, especially Wilko Johnson. To make matters worse, guitarist Johnny Turnbull suffered a head injury and was afflicted with mood swings. He eventually had a nervous breakdown.

The album was preceded by the single "Sueperman's Big Sister", intentionally spelt wrong so to avoid any copyright issues with DC Comics. The 7" release included an exclusive track "You'll See Glimpses", while the 12" included the album's final track "Fucking Ada". The single, Stiff Records' 100th, employed the label for Stiff's very first (Nick Lowe's "Heart of the City") with the track names crossed out and the correct titles and artist (for "Sueperman's Big Sister") written in, as if by ballpoint pen. Laughter was released the same month, November 1980, but the album was not well received by critics and its sales were mediocre. The "Soft as a Baby's Bottom" tour to support it, however, was a sell-out success. Stiff and Ian Dury parted ways afterwards and he signed a short-lived deal with Polydor Records without the Blockheads.

== Style ==
A number of Laughter's songs appear to deal with Dury's personal problems and demons. Although he always denied that "Delusions Of Grandeur" was about himself, most who knew him at the time felt certain it was. Others, such as "Uncoolohol" (about alcoholism), "Manic Depression (Jimi)" and "Fucking Ada" (both about depression) also seem to make clear references to his troubles at the time. "Hey, Hey, Take Me Away" is confirmed to have been about the time he spent at Chailey's Special School while stricken with polio.

In an interview years later, Dury admitted of the album: "I called it Laughter to cheer myself up."

== Track listing ==
No.	Title	Writer(s)	Length
1.	"Sueperman's Big Sister"	Ian Dury, Wilko Johnson	2:49
2.	"Pardon"	Dury, Norman Watt-Roy	2:39
3.	"Delusions of Grandeur"	Dury, Mick Gallagher	2:51
4.	"Yes and No (Paula)"	Dury, Davey Payne	3:06
5.	"Dance of the Crackpots"	Dury, John Turnbull	2:35
6.	"Over The Points"	Dury, Turnbull	4.08
7.	"(Take Your Elbow Out of the Soup) You're Sitting on the Chicken"	Dury, Gallagher	2:34
8.	"Uncoolohol"	Dury, Charley Charles	3:01
9.	"Hey, Hey, Take Me Away"	Dury, Gallagher	2:27
10.	"Manic Depression (Jimi)"	Dury, Gallagher	3:48
11.	"Oh Mr. Peanut"	Dury, Johnson	3:49
12.	"Fucking Ada"	Dury, Turnbull	5:59

Bonus track (Demon edition)
No.	Title	Writer(s)	Length
13.	"Reasons to Be Cheerful, Part 3" (non-album single, 1979)	Dury, Chaz Jankel, Payne

=== Bonus tracks (Edsel 2-CD edition) ===
Disc 1 (Singles)
No.	Title	Writer(s)	Length
13.	"I Want to Be Straight" (non-album single, 1980)	Dury, Gallagher	3:18
14.	"That’s Not All" (B-side of "I Want to Be Straight")	Dury, Payne	2:47
15.	"You’ll See Glimpses" (B-side of "Superman's Big Sister")	Dury, Watt-Roy, Turnbull	3:42

Disc 2 (Album outtakes and demo instrumentals by the Blockheads)
No.	Title	Writer(s)	Length
1.	"Duff ‘Em Up and Do ‘Em Over (Boogie Woogie)" (album outtake)	Dury, Gallagher	3:30
2.	"You Are Here" (album outtake)	Dury, Gallagher	3:26
3.	"Come in No. 9" (album outtake)	Dury, Gallagher	2:13
4.	"Chicken" ("Take Your Elbow Out of the Soup") (demo)	Gallagher	4:08
5.	"CC's Rock" (demo)	Charles, Gallagher, Payne, Turnbull, Watt-Roy	2:44
6.	"I Know Your Name" (demo)	Payne	2:03
7.	"Public Party" ("Dance of the Crackpots") (demo)	Turnbull	3:19
8.	"Black and White" ("Yes and No (Paula)") (demo)	Payne	3:57
9.	"Manic Depression" (demo)	Gallagher	2:52
10.	"More Turns for Everyone" (demo)	Charles, Gallagher, Payne, Turnbull, Watt-Roy	4:08
11.	"Blue Light" ("That’s Not All") (demo)	Payne	2:30
12.	"Back to Y-Front" (demo)	Charles, Gallagher, Payne, Turnbull, Watt-Roy	3:46
13.	"Fatback" (demo)	Charles, Gallagher, Payne, Turnbull, Watt-Roy	3:00
14.	"On the Spot (Do the Block)" (demo)	Charles, Gallagher, Payne, Turnbull, Watt-Roy	4:31
15.	"Duff ‘Em Up and Do ‘Em Over (Boogie Woogie)" ("Oh Mr Peanut") (demo)	Gallagher	3:16
16.	"Peter Gunn" (demo)	Henry Mancini	3:26

== Personnel ==
Ian Dury & the Blockheads

- Ian Dury – vocals
- Wilko Johnson – guitars, backing vocals
- Johnny Turnbull – guitars, backing vocals
- Mick Gallagher – piano, keyboards
- Norman Watt-Roy – bass
- Charley Charles – drums
- Davey Payne – saxophones, harmonica, flute

Additional Personnel

- Don Cherry – pocket trumpet
- Will Gaines – tap dance on "Dance of the Crackpots"
- Ray Cooper – percussion
- Ivor Raymonde – strings

Technical

- Ian Horne – sound engineer, mixing
- Richard Wernham – assistant engineer
- Chris Killip – photography
- Ray Gregory – album design
- Brain Love – album design

== Re-releases ==
The album was re-released by Edsel Records in 2004 as part of a series of 2-CD Ian Dury re-issues. Previously the album had been re-issued to CD by Demon Records, initially with no bonus tracks then with the addition of "Reasons to be Cheerful, Part 3" – a song that had no real relation to the album and featured a different band line-up. Edsel's 2004 re-issue replaced the track with "I Want To be Straight" and "That's Not All", both sides of the first single with the Blockheads line-up that recorded the album and "Superman's Big Sister's" B-side "You'll See Glimpses".

Edsel's re-issue also included a bonus disc of mainly instrumentals mostly recorded by the Blockheads before Dury became involved with the project and three songs, including the final version of "Duff 'Em Up and Do 'Em Over (Boogie Woogie)" the song "Oh Mr. Peanut" began life as. Despite being considered of good quality, Dury and Stiff compere Kosmo Vinyl were worried it might become an anthem for football hooligans or the small percentage of yob culture that followed him and bands like Sham 69 and Dury scrapped the lyric.

== Sources ==
- Sex and Drugs and Rock and Roll: The Life of Ian Dury by Richard Balls, first published 2000, Omnibus Press
- Ian Dury & The Blockheads: Song By Song by Jim Drury, first published 2003, Sanctuary Publishing.
