= The Blockheads =

English rock band

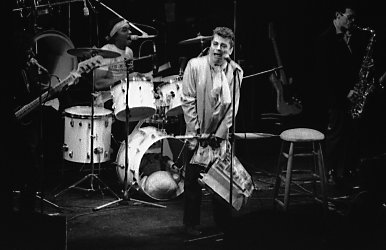
- The Blockheads performing in 1978. Left to right: Norman Watt-Roy (bass), Charley Charles (drums), Ian Dury (vocals) and Davey Payne (saxophone)

Background information
- Also known as: Ian Dury and the Blockheads
- Origin: London, England, United Kingdom
- Genres: New wave; funk; punk rock; pub rock
- Works: The Blockheads discography
- Years active: 1977–present
- Labels: Stiff; Statik; Demon; Ronnie Harris; Blox; EMI
- Members: Chaz Jankel; Nathan King; John Turnbull; Mick Gallagher; John Roberts; Mike Bennett; Occasional: Davey Payne; Dave Lewis; Terry Edwards; Gilad Atzmon
- Past members: Norman Watt-Roy; Ian Dury; Charley Charles; Stephen Monti; Derek Hussey; Merlin Rhys-Jones; Will Parnell; Dylan Howe; Wilko Johnson; Lee Harris
- Website: theblockheads.com

The Blockheads are an English rock band formed in London in 1977. Originally fronted by lead singer Ian Dury as Ian Dury and the Blockheads or Ian and the Blockheads, the band has continued to perform since Dury's death in 2000. As of March 2023 members included Chaz Jankel (guitar and keyboards), Nathan King (bass), Mick Gallagher (keyboards and piano), John Turnbull (vocals and guitar), John Roberts (drums), and Mike Bennett (lead vocals). There is a rolling line-up of saxophonists that includes Gilad Atzmon, Terry Edwards, Dave Lewis, and from time to time, the original sax player, Davey Payne. Between 2000 and 2022, the band's lead vocalist and main lyricist was Derek Hussey.

The band may be best known for their hit singles (recorded with Dury), "What a Waste", "Hit Me with Your Rhythm Stick", "Reasons to Be Cheerful, Part 3", and "Sex & Drugs & Rock & Roll".

== History ==
=== Formation and early years ===
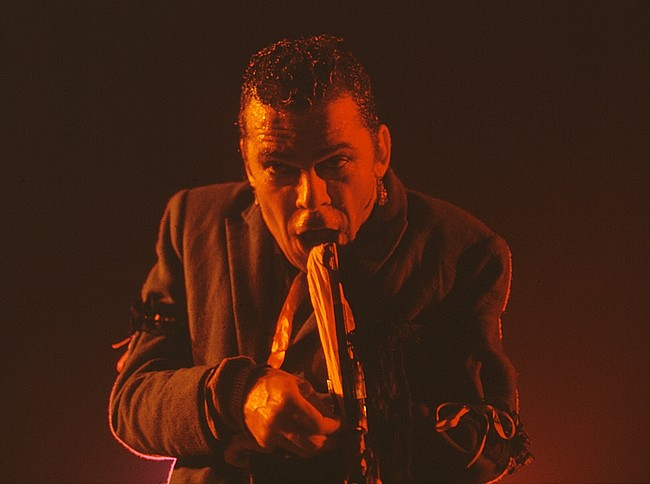
Dury fronting the band at The Roundhouse, Chalk Farm, London, 1978

In 1974, Radio Caroline's Ronan O'Rahilly set up a pop group, the Loving Awareness Band, comprising John Turnbull (guitar) and Mick Gallagher (keyboards; both formerly of 1960s psychedelic rock band Skip Bifferty), along with the session musicians Norman Watt-Roy (bass) and Charley Charles (drums; born Hugh Glenn Mortimer Charles, Guyana, 1945). In 1976, the Loving Awareness Band released their only album, Loving Awareness (ML001), on O'Rahilly's label More Love Records. The album has appeared on CD more than once, although these reissues have been sourced from a mint vinyl pressing rather than from the original master tapes.

The Loving Awareness Band broke up in 1977, and Watt-Roy and Charles joined a new band being formed by Ian Dury, who had begun writing songs with pianist and guitarist Chaz Jankel (the brother of noted music video, TV, commercial and film director Annabel Jankel). With Jankel fashioning Dury's lyrics into number of songs, the two began recording with Charles, Watt-Roy, Gallagher, Turnbull and former Kilburn and the High Roads saxophonist Davey Payne. An album was recorded, but was of no interest to major record labels. Next door to Dury's manager's office, however, was the newly formed Stiff Records, a perfect home for Dury's maverick style.

The band was invited by Stiff to join the "Live Stiffs Tour", and the band Ian Dury and the Blockheads was born, with the name ostensibly taken from the song of the same name which portrayed a drunken Essex stereotype:

They've got womanly breasts under pale mauve vests
Shoes like dead pigs' noses
Cornflake packet jacket, catalogue trousers
A mouth what never closes

- from "Blockheads" (1977)

The tour, which also featured Elvis Costello and the Attractions, Nick Lowe, Wreckless Eric and Larry Wallis, was a great success, and Stiff launched a concerted Ian Dury marketing campaign.

=== Commercial success ===
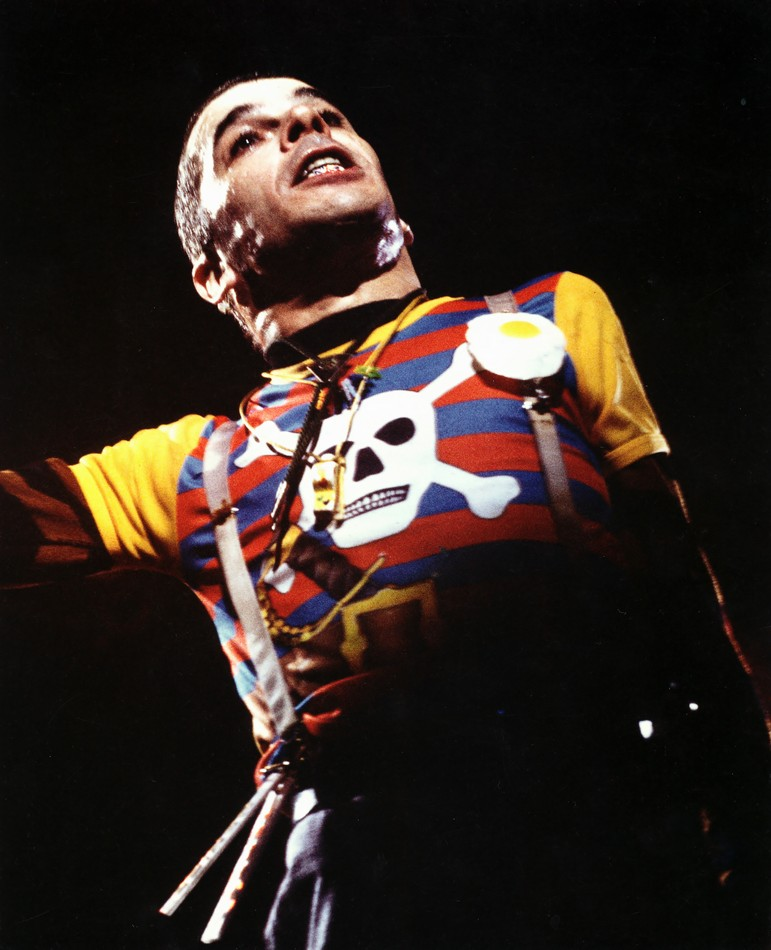
Dury fronting the band at The Roundhouse, Chalk Farm, London, 1978

Under the management of Andrew King and Peter Jenner (the original managers of Pink Floyd) Ian Dury and the Blockheads quickly gained a reputation as one of the top live new wave music acts. Their first single, "Sex & Drugs & Rock & Roll", marked Dury's Stiff debut and although it was banned by the BBC it was named Single of the Week by NME on its release. It was soon followed by the album New Boots and Panties!!, which was eventually to achieve platinum status. (Although it has been claimed that Dury coined the phrase "Sex & Drugs & Rock & Roll", there is evidence that it was already in common use and a very similar phrase had been used by Australian band Daddy Cool for the title of their 1972 second album Sex, Dope & Rock'n'Roll: Teenage Heaven.) A parallel precursor is the longstanding and widely used phrase, wine, women and song. The tune is based on part of Charlie Haden's bass solo on "Ramblin'" on Ornette Coleman's 1959 album Change of the Century.

Dury and the band built up a dedicated following in the UK and other countries and scored several hit singles, including "What a Waste", "Hit Me with Your Rhythm Stick" (which was a UK number one at the beginning of 1979, selling just short of a million copies) and "Reasons to Be Cheerful, Part 3" (number three in the UK in 1979).

The band's second album, Do It Yourself, was released in June 1979 in a Barney Bubbles-designed sleeve of which there were over a dozen variations, all based on samples from the Crown wallpaper catalogue. Bubbles also designed the Blockhead logo, which received international acclaim and which continues to be used by the band as, for example, on their Live in Colchester 2004 DVD.

The hit single "Hit Me With Your Rhythm Stick" was notably not included, however, on the original release of the album. The single and its accompanying music video featured a Davey Payne sax solo with dual saxophones, in evident homage to jazz saxophonist Rahsaan Roland Kirk, who had made this his trademark technique.

The Blockheads' sound drew from its members' diverse musical influences, which included jazz, rock and roll, funk, and reggae, and Dury's love of music hall.

=== Departure of Jankel ===
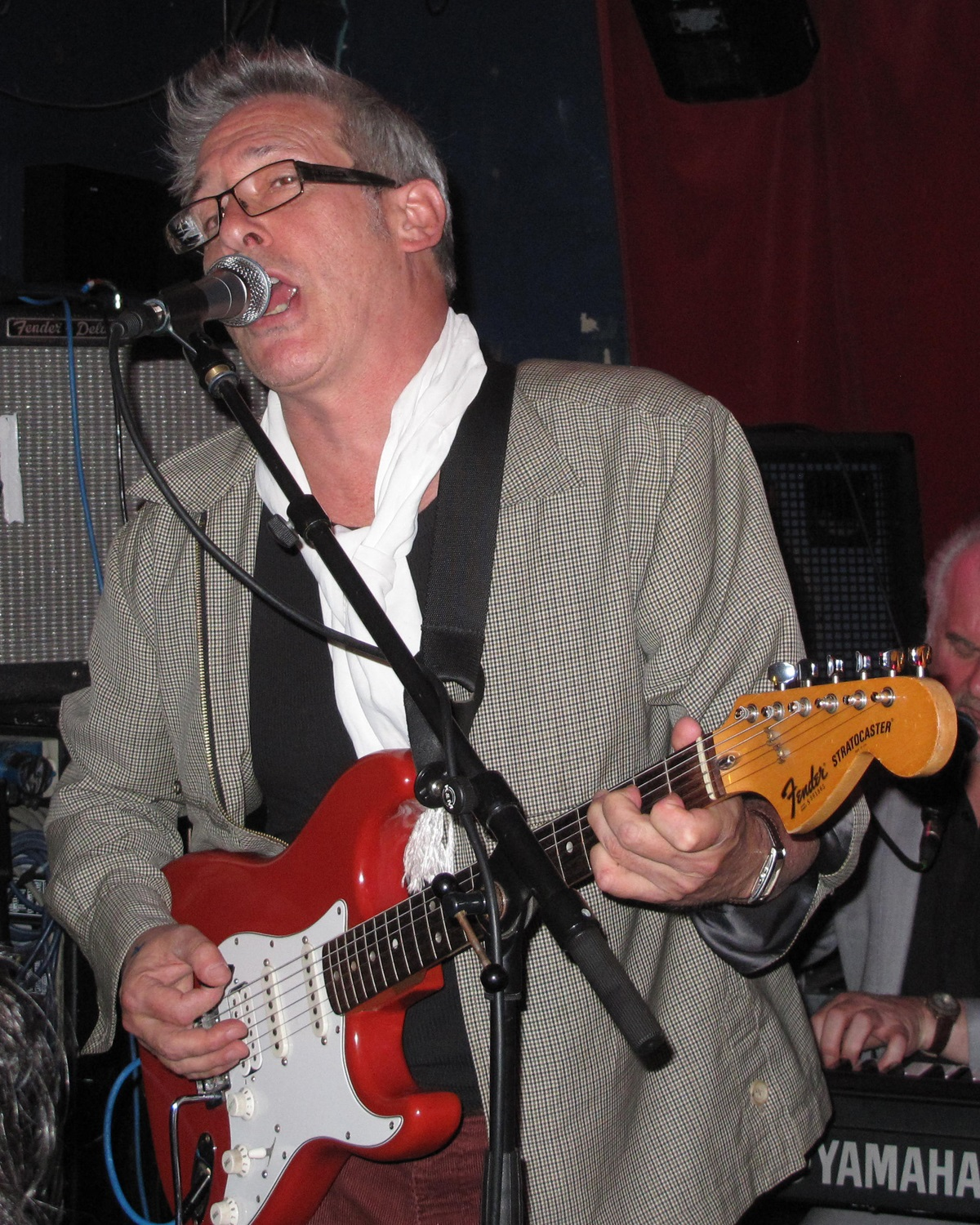
Chas Jankel at Water Rats, July 2011

Jankel left the band temporarily and relocated to the U.S. after the release of "What A Waste" but he subsequently returned to the UK and began touring sporadically with the Blockheads, eventually returning to the group full-time for the recording of "Hit Me With Your Rhythm Stick"; according to Mick Gallagher, the band recorded 28 takes of the song but eventually settled on the second take for the single release. Partly due to personality clashes with Dury, Jankel quit the group again in 1980, after the recording of the Do It Yourself LP, and he returned to the U.S. to concentrate on his solo career. The group worked solidly over the 18 months between the release of "Rhythm Stick" and their next single, "Reasons to Be Cheerful", which returned them to the charts, making the UK Top 10. Jankel was replaced by former Dr. Feelgood guitarist Wilko Johnson, who also contributed to the next album Laughter and its two minor hit singles, although Gallagher recalls that the recording of the Laughter album was difficult and that Dury was drinking heavily in this period. In 1980-81, Dury and Jankel teamed up again with Sly and Robbie and the Compass Point All Stars to record Lord Upminster. The Blockheads toured the U.K. and Europe throughout 1981, sometimes augmented by Don Cherry on trumpet, ending the year with their only tour of Australia.

The Blockheads disbanded in early 1982 after Dury secured a new recording deal with Polydor Records through A&R man Frank Neilson. Choosing to work with a new group of young musicians which he named The Music Students, he recorded the album Four Thousand Weeks' Holiday. This album marked a departure from his usual style and was not as well received by existing fans for its dance music influence.

=== Later years ===
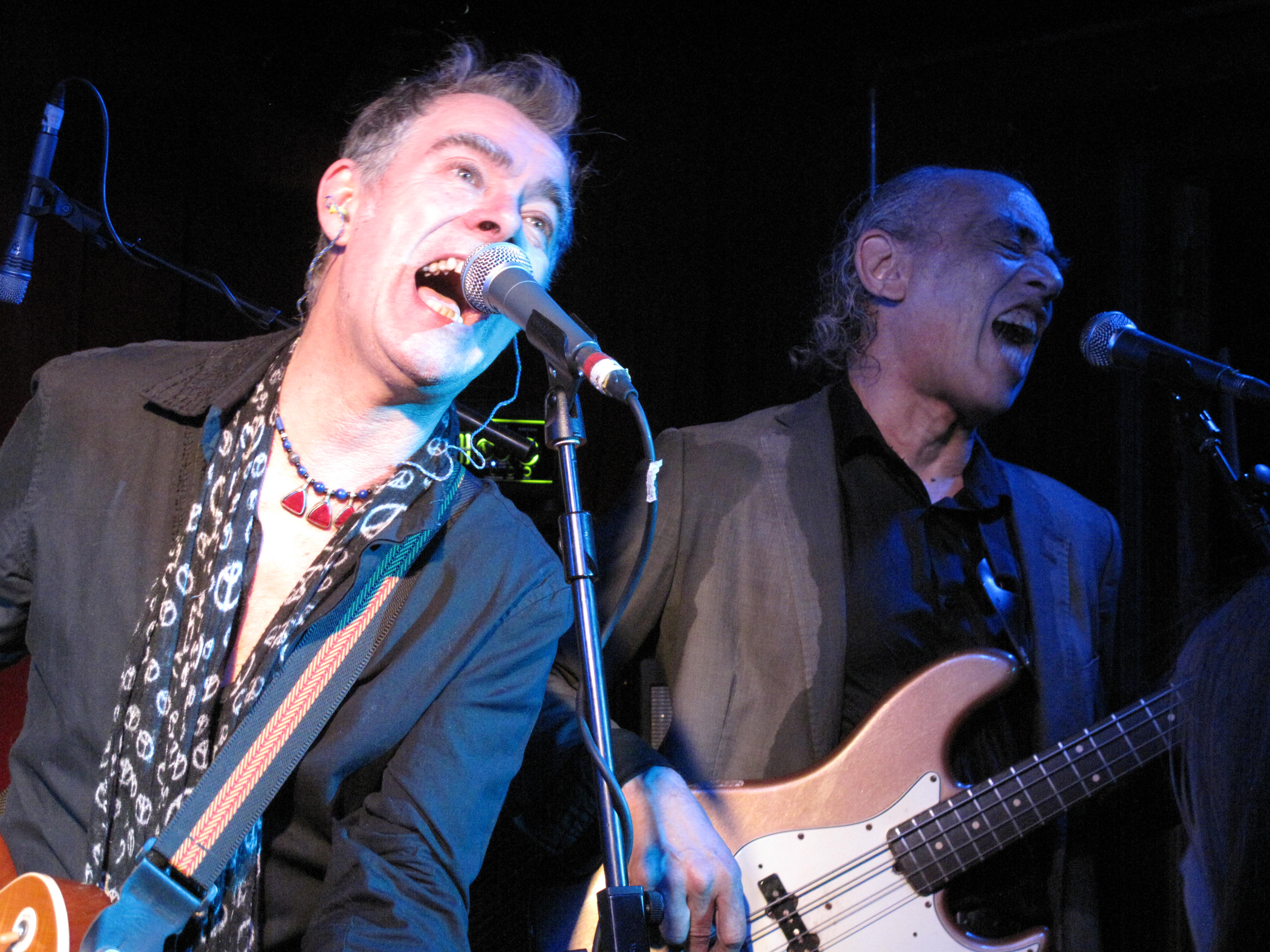
John Turnbull and Norman Watt-Roy at Water Rats, London, July 2011

The Blockheads briefly reformed in June 1987 to play a short tour of Japan and then disbanded again. In September 1990, following the death from colorectal cancer of drummer Charley Charles, they reunited for two benefit concerts in aid of Charles' family, held at The Forum, Kentish Town, with Steven Monti on drums. In December 1990, augmented by Merlin Rhys-Jones on guitar and Will Parnell on percussion, they recorded the live album Warts & Audience at the Brixton Academy.

The Blockheads (without Jankel, who returned to California) toured Spain in January 1991, then disbanded again until August 1994 when, following Jankel's return to England, they were invited to reform for the Madstock Festival in Finsbury Park; this was followed by sporadic gigs in Europe, Ireland, the UK and Japan through late 1994 and 1995. In the early 1990s, Dury appeared with English band Curve on the benefit compilation album Peace Together. Dury and Curve singer Toni Halliday shared vocals on a cover of the Blockheads' track "What a Waste".

In March 1996, Dury was diagnosed with cancer. After his recovery from surgery, he set about writing another album. In late 1996 he reunited with the Blockheads to record the well-received Mr. Love Pants. Ian Dury and the Blockheads toured again, with Dylan Howe replacing Steven Monti on drums. Davey Payne left the group in August and was replaced by Gilad Atzmon. This amended line-up gigged throughout 1999 and performances culminated in their last performance with Dury on 6 February 2000 at the London Palladium. Dury died six weeks later on 27 March 2000.

=== Without Dury (2000–present) ===
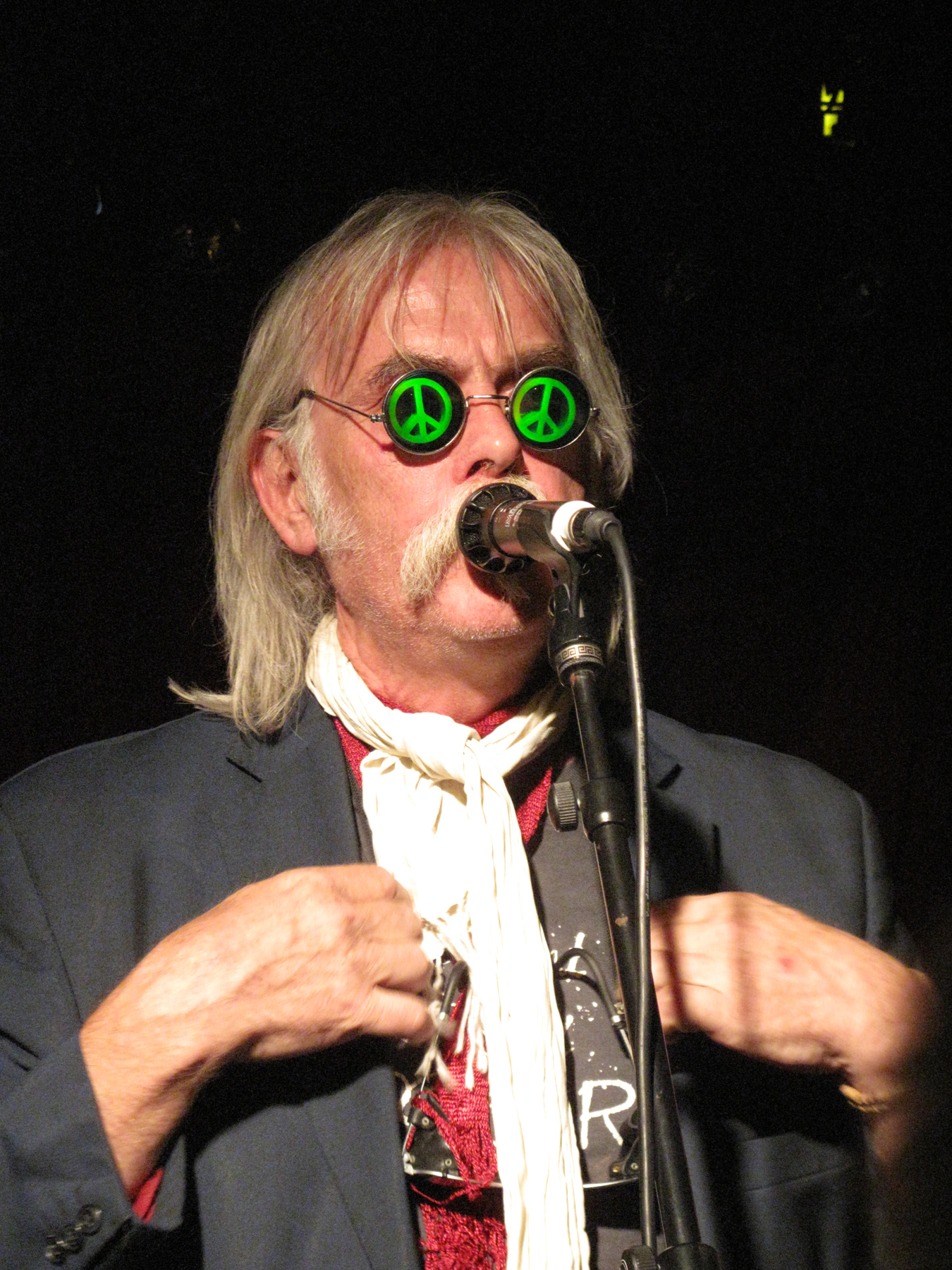
Derek "the Draw" Hussey at Water Rats, London, July 2011

The Blockheads have continued after Dury's death. The band contributed to the 2001 tribute album Brand New Boots and Panties, then releasing Where's the Party (2004), Staring Down the Barrel (2009), and the live album 30 Live At the Electric Ballroom (2008) to mark the 30th anniversary of New Boots and Panties!!.

Derek Hussey, aka "Derek The Draw", who was Dury's friend and minder, joined the band in 2000. He became the main lyricist and Blockhead storyteller, writing songs with Jankel and also singing lead vocals. Hussey died in February 2022.

John Roberts joined as drummer in 2001.

On 23 November 2013, the band released the studio album Same Horse Different Jockey, 35 years to the day from when the band's only number one "Hit Me with Your Rhythm Stick" was released. The promotional video for the album, featuring the song "Greed", was directed and photographed by cinematographer Stuart Harris and included cameo appearances by Martin Freeman, Toby Jones and Rowland Rivron.

In December 2014, the band performed a parody of "Reasons to Be Cheerful, Part 3" at the conclusion of Charlie Brooker's Charlie Brooker's 2014 Wipe on BBC Two.

Gilad Atzmon who, despite being an Israeli born Jew, has since revoked his Jewish identity, and has called himself a "proud self-hating Jew". This led to problems in 2018 when the Blockheads were planning on performing a gig in Islington, and it was announced that after complaints from a Jewish local that Atzmon was to be banned from playing with the Blockheads at the venue.

Mike Bennett joined on vocals in May 2022. Nathan King took over from Norman Watt-Roy on bass in 2022.

As of April 2023, The Blockheads are still touring. Their line-up includes Mickey Gallagher (keyboards), Chaz Jankel (guitar, vocals, keyboards), John Turnbull (guitar), John Roberts (drums), Dave Lewis (sax), Nathan King (bass), and Mike Bennett (vocals). There is a rolling line-up of saxophonists that includes Gilad Atzmon, Terry Edwards, Dave Lewis, and from time to time, the original sax player, Davey Payne.

== Musical style ==
The Blockheads' style has been described as encompassing new wave, post-punk, funk, disco, pub rock, and punk.

== Documentary film ==
In 2015, Free Seed Films launched a crowdfunding campaign to raise £50,000 in order to fund a documentary film, Beyond the Call of Dury, about the careers of the four original members of the band (Gallagher, Jankel, Turnbull and Watt-Roy), from their early days in the 1960s, including their work with Dury, until the present. On 3 July 2018 a performance by The Blockheads was filmed for the documentary, with the soundtrack recorded straight to vinyl. The band were live streamed for Soho Radio, with an interview following the music. The film was due for release in November 2018; however, due to various problems, including copyright issues for some of the material, gaining access to some of the subjects who were interviewed, the COVID-19 pandemic in England, the film had not yet been released as of April 2023.

== Notable hits ==
=== "Sex & Drugs & Rock & Roll" ===
The song was written by Dury and Jankel in Dury's flat in Oval Mansions, London (nicknamed "Catshit mansions" by Dury) that overlooked The Oval cricket-ground. Dury typically presented Jankel with his hand-typed lyric sheets. According to Chas in Sex And Drugs And Rock And Roll: The Life of Ian Dury, he would be repeatedly given the lyric for "Sex And Drugs And Rock And Roll" but kept rejecting the song only for it to be at the top of the pile in the next batch of songs, only to be rejected again. This went on until Dury sang the song's title in time with the intended guitar riff. Sometime later Jankel heard "Ramblin", a tune by Ornette Coleman (from the album Change of the Century, which also featured Charlie Haden and Don Cherry), and heard exactly the same bass riff being played by Haden.

Dury once apologised to Coleman for lifting the riff but, as Coleman explained, he (or possibly Haden) had lifted it himself from a Kentucky folk tune called "Old Joe Clark". An alternative version to this story exists: as Dury explained when he guested on BBC Radio 4's Desert Island Discs, he had apologised to Haden at Ronnie Scott's Club for the riff lift, who responded by saying there was no need for an apology as he himself had lifted it from an old Cajun tune.

The single did not chart, selling only around 19,000 copies (a small number for a single in 1977) but won critical acclaim. One factor of the poor sales performance may have been Stiff Records' singles deletion policy designed to promote initial sales and as such, chart success - the single was deleted after only two months.

Released, as it was, at the height of the popularity of punk rock, the song was misinterpreted (and often is to this day) as a song about excess, as its title and chorus might suggest. Although the single was banned by the BBC, a number of Radio 1 disc jockeys, including Annie Nightingale and John Peel, continued to promote the record by playing the mildly salacious B-side "Razzle In My Pocket". Dury himself maintained, however, that the song was not a punk anthem and said he was trying to suggest that there was more to life than a 9-to-5 existence (as in, for example, his track-by-track comments for the sleeve-notes of Repertoire Records' Reasons To Be Cheerful: The Best Of Ian Dury & The Blockheads compilation). The verse lyrics are at times somewhat inscrutable, although always suggestive of an alternative lifestyle:

Here's a little bit of advice, you're quite welcome, it is free
Don’t do nothing that is cut-price, you'll know what that'll make you be
They will try their tricky device, trap you with the ordin'ry
Get your teeth into a small slice [of] the cake of liberty.

The title of the song became part of the English language and was later used in many other song lyrics.

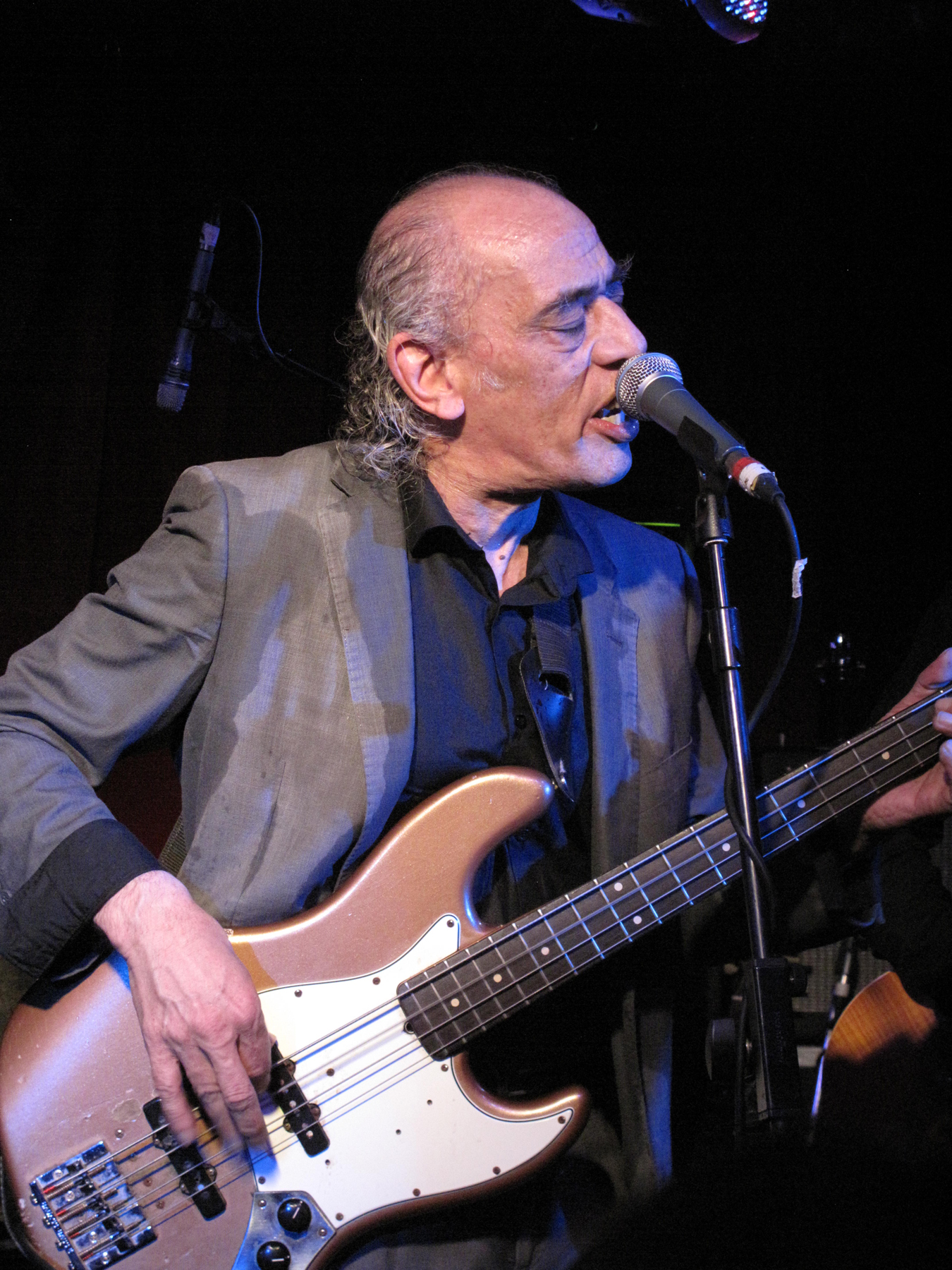
Norman Watt-Roy at Water Rats, July 2011

=== "Billericay Dickie" ===
Narrated by a bragging bricklayer from Billericay, the song is filled with name-checks for places in Essex and features a number of suggestive rhymes:

I had a love affair with Nina
In the back of my Cortina
A seasoned-up hyena
Could not have been more obscener

Each verse tells a different short story, relating one of Dickie's sexual conquests in southeastern England, while the choruses see him insisting he is a caring, conscientious lover and "not a thickie", even giving the names of two girls ("a pair of squeaky chickies") as references who would attest to this. Dickie is a character most commonly referred to in the media as an "Essex lad". The song, perhaps the best example of Dury's "Englishness" or "Essexness", was given its fairground-like arrangement by American Steve Nugent.

Dury frequently stated (as, for example, in both his biographies Sex And Drugs And Rock And Roll: The Life Of Ian Dury and Ian Dury & The Blockheads: Song By Song) that he saw Dickie as a pathetic figure. He would reflect this on-stage by breaking down in the final part of the song, as if about to cry, before returning to shout the final lines. The song was rarely used as an opener for live sets ("Wake Up And Make Love With Me" commonly being used instead), but it does open the 1985 set recorded live at the Hammersmith Odeon that was released as the Hold Onto Your Structure VHS/DVD. Live versions can also be found on the two live albums Warts 'n' Audience and Straight from the Desk.

=== "What a Waste" ===
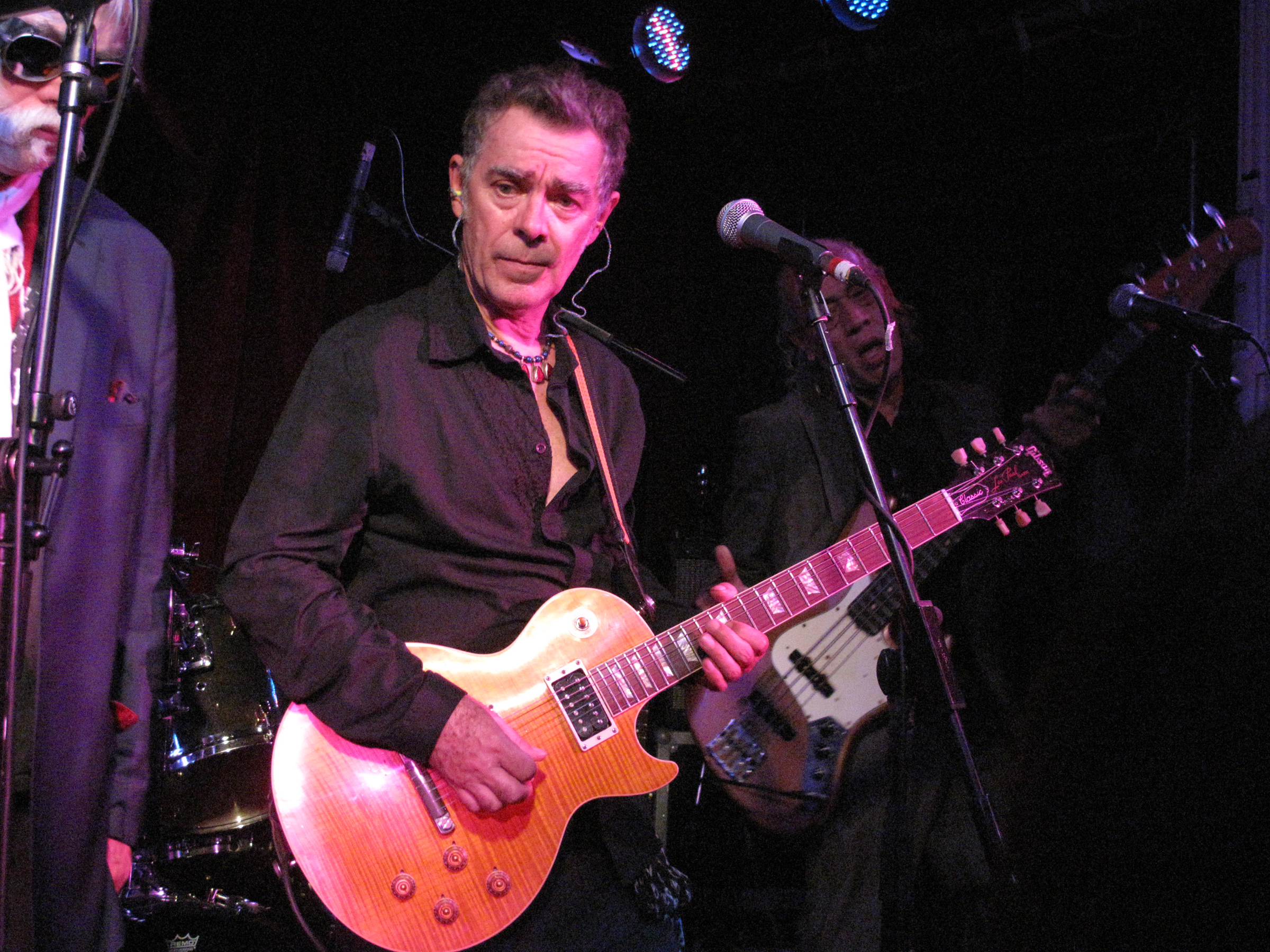
John Turnbull at Water Rats, London, July 2011

Essentially the song is about being in a job that makes you happy. Dury claimed, in a 1984 interview with Penthouse magazine that, while not condemning 9-to-5 jobs, he had written the song to make people question their lives, echoing the sentiments of his earlier single "Sex and Drugs and Rock and Roll". The song's verses list a number of occupations that the narrator could have taken, including driver, poet, teacher and soldier, even an inmate in a long-term institution and the ticket man at Fulham Broadway tube station. The chorus reveals that instead he chose to "play the fool in a six-piece band", highlighting some of its disadvantages, particularly loneliness, before deciding that "rock 'n' roll don't mind".

The song was written with Rod Melvin in mid-1975, two years before its eventual release. It was written following the break-up of Kilburn and the Highroads, and in a lull between the formation of Ian Dury & the Kilburns. Originally a third writing credit was given to Jankel, Dury's long-term songwriting companion, but this credit has gradually been phased out and the 2004 Edsel Records re-issue of Do it Yourself credits the song solely to Dury/Melvin. In the 2004 book Ian Dury & The Blockheads: Song By Song by Jim Drury and Phill Jupitus, however, guitarist John Turnbull claims that the middle instrumental section was brought over from one of the songs which four Blockhead members had written between them while in their previous band Loving Awareness.

The song, Dury's first hit, was released in April 1978, just before the start of a headlining tour, entering the Top 75 on 29 April and spending 12 weeks there. It peaked at No. 9 in the UK Single Charts, becoming Stiff Records' biggest-selling single. A very limited 12" pressing was also released. Although the song is seen as specifically a Blockheads song, the B-side, "Wake Up and Make Love with Me", was taken from Dury's New Boots and Panties!! album.

=== "Hit Me with Your Rhythm Stick" ===
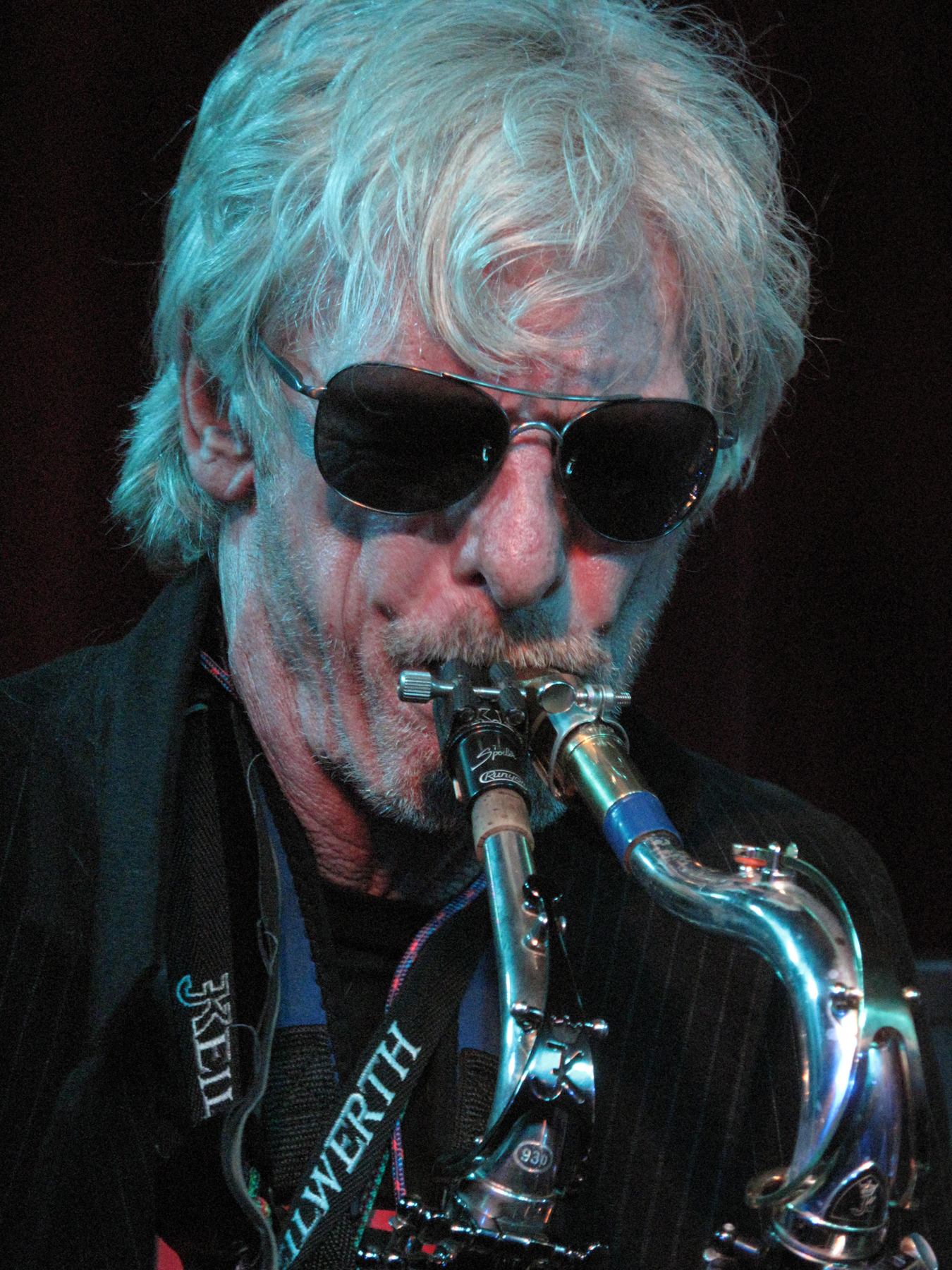
Davey Payne at Water Rats, 2011

First released as the Stiff Records 7" single BUY 38, "Hit Me With Your Rhythm Stick"/"There Ain't Half Been Some Clever Bastards" was Number One in the UK Singles Chart in January 1979 and is the band's most successful single. It also was named the best single of 1979 in the Pazz & Jop poll.

Its lyrics mix various locations across the world and a number of phrases in non-English languages (including French and German). According to Dury the song has an anti-violence message.

=== "Reasons to Be Cheerful, Part 3" ===
Released on 20 July 1979, the single "Reasons to Be Cheerful, Part 3"/"Common as Muck" reached No. 3 in the UK Singles Chart the following month. It was the last single to be released by the band with their original line-up.

== Members ==
=== Current ===
- John Turnbull – guitar, vocals (1977–1982, 1987, 1990–1991, 1994–1995, 1996–present)
- Mick Gallagher – keyboards, organ (1977–1982, 1987, 1990–1991, 1994–1995, 1996–present)
- Davey Payne – saxophone, harmonica, flute (1977–1982, 1987, 1990–1991, 1994–1995, 1996; occasional shows)
- Chaz Jankel – guitar, keyboards, piano, vocals (1977–1978, 1978–1980, 1987, 1990, 1994–1995, 1996–present)
- Gilad Atzmon – saxophone (1996–?; occasional shows)
- John Roberts – drums (2001–present)
- Mike Bennett – vocals (2022–present)
- Nathan King – bass (2022–present; substitute beforehand)
- Terry Edwards – saxophone (occasional shows)
- Dave Lewis – saxophone (occasional shows)

=== Former ===
- Norman Watt-Roy – bass, backing vocals (1977–1982, 1987, 1990–1991, 1994–1995, 1996–2022)
- Ian Dury – lead vocals (1977–1982, 1987, 1990–1991, 1994–1995, 1996–2000; his death)
- Charley Charles – drums, backing vocals (1977–1982, 1987; died 1990)
- Wilko Johnson – guitar, backing vocals (1980–1982; died 2022)
- Steven Monti – drums (1990–1991, 1994–1995)
- Merlin Rhys-Jones – guitar (1990–1991)
- Will Parnell – percussion (1990–1991)
- Dylan Howe – drums (1996–2001)
- Derek Hussey – vocals (2000–2022; his death)

== Discography ==
- New Boots and Panties!! (1977)
- Do It Yourself (1979)
- Laughter (1980)
- Live! Warts 'n' Audience (1990)
- The Bus Driver's Prayer and other Stories (1994)
- Mr. Love Pants (1998)
- Straight from the Desk (2001)
- Ten More Turnips from the Tip (2002)
- Where's the Party? (2004)
- 30 – Live at The Electric Ballroom (2008)
- Staring Down the Barrel (2009)
- Same Horse Different Jockey (2013)
- Beyond the Call of Dury (2017)
