= Mr Maserati 2001–2021 =

Compilation album by Baxter Dury
- Released: 10 June 2022
- Length: 46:16
- Label: Heavenly
- Producer: Baxter Dury

Baxter Dury chronology
The Night Chancers (2020)	Mr Maserati 2001–2021 (2022)	I Thought I Was Better Than You (2023)

Singles from Mr Maserati 2001–2021
- 1. "D.O.A." Released: 12 October 2021

Mr Maserati 2001–2021 is a best-of album by the English musician Baxter Dury, released on 10 June 2022 via Heavenly Recordings. As his first-ever compilation, it contains songs from each of Dury's six solo albums up to that point, plus "D.O.A.", an original song which led the record as a single and was written and recorded with his son, Kosmo. It was met with positive critical reception, and upon its delayed release, it peaked on the UK Independent and Scottish Albums Charts at no. 13 and no. 56, respectively.

== Content and title ==
Mr Maserati 2001–2021 contains twelve songs, eleven of which were selected from each of Dury's six solo albums from his two-decade-long career. It also includes one new song, the hip-hop-influenced "D.O.A.", recorded with his son, Kosmo. He referred to it as a "provincial nod" to artists such as Kendrick Lamar, Frank Ocean, and Tyler the Creator, all of whom he had begun listening to because of his son during lockdown. According to Baxter Dury, he wrote the lyrics, while Kosmo wrote everything that he himself did not possess "the musical skills for". The compilation's title comes from a line in its opener, "Miami"; in the song, the narrator refers to himself as "Mr. Maserati".

== Single and release ==
The album was announced on 12 October 2021 and led by the single "D.O.A.", accompanied with a music video directed by Tom Beard. Mr Maserati 2001–2021 was originally scheduled to be released the following 13 December by Heavenly Recordings, but due to vinyl shortages, Dury announced via social media that it was delayed to 11 February 2022, just to be delayed further back to 10 June 2022. The record marks his first-ever compilation. It subsequently peaked on the UK Independent and Scottish Albums Charts at no. 13 and no. 56, respectively.

== Critical reception ==
Professional ratings
Review scores
Source	Rating
Clash	8/10
The Irish Times	3/5 stars
Record Collector	4/5 stars

In an eight out of ten review for Clash, Megan Walder said that Dury "manages to flip the script" in that, unlike many best-of compilations, it doesn't stick mostly to material from his most successful album. Additionally, in praise of new track "D.O.A.", they said "you can see why Dury has all the confidence in his son [Kosmo]'s developing career." Tony Clayton-Lea of The Irish Times, rating it three stars out of five, stated that Dury's frequent takes on both high and low society on the album demonstrate that he did well in living up to his father's legacy. Louder Than War's Ryan Walker opined that the compilation is both straightforward and accessible, demonstrating a musically-diverse career and "remind[ing] us why we fell for the artist ... in the first place". As criticism, Walker thought that the choice to only include twelve tracks caused it to feel "a little sparse at times".

== Track listing ==
All lyrics are written by Baxter Dury, except "Leak at the Disco" (with Madelaine Hart and Mike Moore) and "Claire" (with Hart and Mark Neary); all music is composed by Baxter Dury, with additional composers noted below.

Mr Maserati 2001–2021 track listing
No.	Title	Music	Original album	Length
1.	"Miami"	Ben Gallagher; Madelaine Hart	Prince of Tears (2017)	4:34
2.	"I'm Not Your Dog"	Lee Canham; Hart; Shaun Paterson	The Night Chancers (2020)	2:58
3.	"Leak at the Disco"	Hart	Happy Soup (2011)	5:12
4.	"Cocaine Man"	Michael Mooney; Chris Newton; Damon Reece	Floor Show (2005)	3:53
5.	"Palm Trees"	Fabienne Débarre; Mike Moore	It's a Pleasure (2014)	4:21
6.	"Oi"		Prince of Tears	2:22
7.	"Oscar Brown"	Lou Reed	Len Parrot's Memorial Lift (2002)	5:36
8.	"Claire"	Hart; Mike Neary	Happy Soup	3:35
9.	"Other Men's Girls"	Débarre; Moore	It's a Pleasure	3:45
10.	"Carla's Got a Boyfriend"	Hart; Paterson	The Night Chancers	3:47
11.	"Prince of Tears"	Gallagher; Hart	Prince of Tears	3:05
12.	"D.O.A."	Kosmo Dury		3:08
Total length:				46:16

== Personnel ==
Credits are adapted from the CD liner notes.

- Baxter Dury – production (except track 7)
- Ash Workman – production (1, 6, 11)
- Craig Silvey – production (2–4, 8, 10), mixing (except 12)
- Nick Terry – production (4, 7)
- Mike Moore – production (5, 9)
- Kosmo Dury – production (12)
- David Wrench – mixing (12)
- Steve Gullick – reverse cover photograph
- Hannah Martin – chain
- Louise Mason for Sawn-Off – cover photograph, layout

== Charts ==
Chart performance for Mr Maserati 2001‍–‍2021
Chart (2022)	Peak position
Scottish Albums (OCC)	56
UK Albums Sales (OCC)	60
UK Independent Albums (OCC)	13
