= Different Recordings =

- Parent company: PIAS
- Founded: 1996
- Distributor: Virgin Music Group
- Genre: Various
- Country of origin: Belgium
- Official website: http://www.differentrecordings.com/

Different Recordings is an electronic music label owned by the PIAS, an international independent music company. After a three-year hiatus, the label returned in 2015 with a family of new signings from Claptone, Anna of the North, Vessels, KLLO, Infinity Ink and Denney. The label looks to champion a fresh crop of forward thinking, electronic artists.

It was launched during the emergence of the French house scene and over the years has represented a broad range of electronic music with releases by artists such as Etienne de Crecy, Alex Gopher, Alan Braxe, Tiga, The Hacker, Felix Da Housecat, MSTRKRFT, Crystal Castles and Vitalic.

== History ==
The label's first release in 1996 was the album Pansoul by Motorbass, a project of producers Etienne de Crecy and Philippe Zdar of Cassius. De Crecy’s next project, Superdiscount, was released a year later and is still considered by some as the first album of the French house genre.

With the signing of acts like The Hacker, Tiga and Vitalic the label started to develop a broad electronic artist roster.

In 2008 Different Recordings licensed and released the eponymous debut album by Crystal Castles which was named by the NME as one of the best albums of the decade with the band featuring on the magazine’s cover twice in one year.

In November 2022, Universal Music Group purchased 49% stake in [PIAS] (including Different).

== Artists ==
Different currently has Anna Of The North, Claptone, DBFC, DNKL, Henry Krinkle, Infinity Ink, Innerspace Orchestra, Kllo, Shadow Child, TÂCHES and Vessels on their roster.

Previous artists include Abstraxion, Agoria, Alex Gopher, Alex Martin Ensemble, Alexander Kowalski, Bloody Beetroots, Crystal Castles, Crystal Fighters, D/R/U/G/S, Etienne de Crecy, Felix Da Housecat, Harissa, Kiko, Kris Menace and DJ Pierre, Lifelike, Matt & Kim, Max Bitt, Motorbass, Mr. No, M.S.K., MSTRKRFT, Mustang, Neven, Padded Cell, Terence Fixmer, T.D.R., The Hacker, Rina Sawayama, Super Discount, Tiga, Villeneuve, Vitalic and Xenia Beliayeva.

== See also ==
- [PIAS]
