= Super Discount 3 =

Studio album by Étienne de Crécy
- Released: 16 January 2015
- Genre: House; electro-pop
- Length: 40:16
- Label: Pixadelic; A+lso; Sony
- Producer: Étienne de Crécy

Étienne de Crécy studio albums chronology
Super Discount 2 (2004)	Super Discount 3 (2015)	B.E.D (2018)

Super Discount 3 is the fourth studio album by French DJ and producer Étienne de Crécy, released on 16 January 2015 through Pixadelic, A+lso and Sony Music. The album is the third in de Crécy's Super Discount series and follows 2004's Super Discount 2.

The album includes collaborations with Madeline Follin of Cults, Pos & Dave, Alex Gopher, Tom Burke, Julien Delfaud, Kilo Kish and Baxter Dury.

== Background ==
Super Discount 3 marks the first time de Crécy has worked with singers, and combines samples and synthesizers, which Crécy used separately on Super Discount (1996) and Super Discount 2 (2004) respectively. The songs were recorded quickly and constructed so that de Crécy could play them in his DJ sets.

== Critical reception ==
Professional ratings
Review scores
Source	Rating
AllMusic	4/5 stars
The Arts Desk	3/5 stars

David Jeffries of AllMusic opined that Super Discount 3 "electro pops and thumps like its predecessor, and offers a variety of moods" with "crafted bits of cool dance [that] offer instant gratification". Reviewing the album for The Arts Desk, Caspar Gomez found the album melds "fizzing 21st-century electro-pop that's the calling card of everyone from Robyn to La Roux with a bangin' four-to-the-floor club agenda".

Guido Farnell of The Music wrote that the album contains "instantly gratifying dancefloor kicks", and while "Thick beats and rubbery bass are his trademark[, ...] this time around De Crécy has worked with vocalists achieving an almost electro-pop vibe on this release". Michael Smith of Renowned for Sound felt that "the album is full of strong instrumentals with memorable hooks and little tricks to differentiate tracks" with strong melodies "and some curveballs [...] thrown throughout, some great and some less so".

== Track listing ==
Super Discount 3 track listing
No.	Title	Length
1.	"Night (Cut the Crap)"	5:22
2.	"You" (with Madeline Follin)	3:34
3.	"WTF" (with Pos & Dave)	3:33
4.	"Hashtag My Ass"	3:11
5.	"Smile" (with Alex Gopher)	4:32
6.	"Sunset" (with Tom Burke)	4:07
7.	"Amazing" (with Julien Delfaud)	4:02
8.	"Follow" (with Kilo Kish)	3:33
9.	"Love"	4:18
10.	"Family" (with Baxter Dury)	4:04
Total length:		40:16

== Charts ==
Chart performance for Super Discount 3
Chart (2015)	Peak position
Belgian Albums (Ultratop Flanders)	56
Belgian Albums (Ultratop Wallonia)	103
French Albums (SNEP)	40
Swiss Albums (Schweizer Hitparade)	99
