= I Thought I Was Better Than You =

Studio album by Baxter Dury
- Released: 2 June 2023
- Studio: Hoxa; Deptford Beat Cabin
- Genre: Hip-hop
- Length: 27:27
- Label: Heavenly; PIAS
- Producer: Paul White; Baxter Dury

Baxter Dury chronology
| Mr Maserati 2001–2021 (2022) | I Thought I Was Better Than You (2023) | Allbarone (2025) |

Singles from I Thought I Was Better Than You
- 1. "Aylesbury Boy" Released: 7 March 2023; 2. "Leon" Released: 5 April 2023; 3. "Celebrate Me" Released: 2 May 2023

I Thought I Was Better Than You is the seventh studio album by English musician Baxter Dury. It was produced by Paul White together with Dury and was released through Heavenly Recordings on 2 June 2023. It was Dury's first album since his 2021 memoir Chaise Longue.

== Promotion and singles ==
Alongside the announcement for the album, the lead single, "Aylesbury Boy", was released on 7 March 2023. Featuring the vocalist JGrrey, the song was also accompanied by a music video directed by Noel Paul. The second single "Leon", which also features JGrrey, was released on 5 April 2023, and according to Dury, the song is a semi-autobiographical story about himself and a former classmate. He revealed the album's third and final single "Celebrate Me" on 2 May 2023.

== Release ==
I Thought I Was Better Than You was released on 2 June 2023 through Heavenly Recordings. The album debuted and peaked at no. 41 on the UK Albums Chart, Dury's highest position to date.

== Critical reception ==
Professional ratings
Aggregate scores
| Source | Rating |
|---|---|
| Metacritic | 81/100 |
Review scores
| Source | Rating |
| AllMusic | 3.5/5 stars |
| The Arts Desk | 5/5 stars |
| Buzz | 4/5 stars |
| Classic Rock | 8/10 |
| DIY | 4/5 stars |
| Hot Press | 7/10 |
| The Line of Best Fit | 8/10 |
| Loud and Quiet | 8/10 |
| Mojo | 4/5 stars |
| Uncut | 8/10 |

I Thought I Was Better Than You received a score of 81/100 on the review aggregator website Metacritic based on 7 critics, indicating "universal acclaim".

In a five star review for The Arts Desk, Kathryn Reilly said that despite the relatively short running time of the album, it does not lack "in emotional insight. ... Here we have the characteristic all-consuming melancholy that oozes from Baxter Dury but without the menace of Prince of Tears. Reviewing the album for Mojo, Andrew Perry lauded I Thought... as "Baxter's third cracking album in a row, a consistency which eluded even papa Ian." Tim Sendra, in a review for AllMusic, praised Dury's stylistic shift towards "hip-hop and R&B" while noting that "he and White make it work without lapsing into rip-off territory."

Zara Hedderman of Loud and Quiet said in a four star review that I Thought... "serves as a companion piece to his 2021 memoir, Chaise Longue; the two share characters, and musically it complements the text very well." In The Line of Best Fit, Janne Oinonen came to a similar conclusion, adding "Dury's talents require no piggybacking on anyone else's fame: this is the real deal."

=== Year-end lists ===
| Publication | List | Rank | Ref. |
|---|---|---|---|
| Rough Trade UK | Albums of the Year 2023 | 7 | |
| Under the Radar | Top 100 Albums of 2023 | 96 | |

== Track listing ==
All tracks are written by Baxter and Kosmo Dury, except where noted.

I Thought I Was Better Than You track listing
| No. | Title | Writer(s) | Length |
|---|---|---|---|
| 1. | "So Much Money" | | 2:37 |
| 2. | "Aylesbury Boy" (feat. JGrrey) | | 3:31 |
| 3. | "Celebrate Me" | | 3:17 |
| 4. | "Leon" (feat. JGrrey) | | 2:48 |
| 5. | "Crashes" | Baxter Dury | 3:08 |
| 6. | "Sincere" | Baxter Dury | 1:03 |
| 7. | "Pale White Nissan" (feat. JGrrey) | Baxter Dury; Fishmans (Note: "Pale White Nissan" contains piano and guitar samples from Long Season by Fishmans.) | 2:56 |
| 8. | "Shadow" | Baxter Dury; Paul White; Psymun | 2:06 |
| 9. | "Crowded Rooms" | | 3:09 |
| 10. | "Glows" | | 2:52 |
| Total length: | | | 27:27 |

== Personnel ==
Credits are adapted from the I Thought I Was Better Than You LP.

=== Musicians ===
- Baxter Dury – vocals (except track 6), synths (except 3, 9), piano (1, 6, 9), strings (4, 9), bass (5, 7), drum programming (6)
- Madelaine Hart – vocals (1, 3–7, 10)
- Paul White – drum programming (1–2, 4–5, 7), synths (4, 7, 9), backing track (8)
- Kosmo Dury – bass (3–4, 6), guitars (3–4, 10), strings (1, 3), piano (2), synths (3), vocals (3), flute (10)
- Billy Fuller – bass (1–2, 4, 9)
- JGrrey – vocals (2, 4, 9)
- Marley Mackie – bass (1)
- Eska – vocals (8)
- Psymun – backing track (8)

=== Technical and design ===
- Paul White, Baxter Dury – production
- Jimmy Hogarth – extra production on "So Much Money"
- David Wrench – mixing
- Matt Colton – mastering
- Tom Beard – photography
- Louise Mason – design

== Charts ==
| Chart (2023) | Peak position |
|---|---|
| Scottish Albums (OCC) | 10 |
| French Albums (SNEP) | 200 |
| UK Albums (OCC) | 41 |
| UK Albums Chart Update (OCC) | 17 |
| UK Albums Sales (OCC) | 11 |
| UK Independent Albums (OCC) | 5 |
