= B.E.D (album) =

Studio album by Baxter Dury, Étienne de Crécy, and Delilah Holliday
- Released: 26 October 2018
- Recorded: 2017–early 2018
- Genre: Electronic
- Length: 19:12
- Labels: Heavenly; PIAS Le Label
- Producers: Étienne de Crécy; Baxter Dury

Baxter Dury chronology
Prince of Tears (2017)	B.E.D (2018)	The Night Chancers (2020)

Étienne de Crécy studio albums chronology
Super Discount 3 (2015)	B.E.D (2018)	Warm Up (2025)

Singles from B.E.D
- 1. "White Coats" Released: 10 September 2018

B.E.D is a collaborative album by the English musician Baxter Dury, the French producer Étienne de Crécy, and Delilah Holliday of the London band Skinny Girl Diet. Preceded by the single "White Coats", it was released on 26 October 2018 on Heavenly Recordings and PIAS Le Label and was produced by de Crécy and Dury. The album was mostly met with positive reviews upon release.

== Background and recording ==
Dury previously collaborated with de Crécy on the song "Family" for the latter's album Super Discount 3 (2015). After Dury recorded Prince of Tears (2017) in 2016 and spent time in Paris, the prospect of making a record together became more feasible. Eventually, the pair sought to enlist a second vocalist for the project. When Dury was shooting the cover for Prince of Tears, his photographer Tom Beard, aware that they were looking for a singer, recommended Delilah Holliday of the band Skinny Girl Diet. Delilah and her sister Ursula Holliday were subsequently invited to Paris via Eurostar on a three-day trip.

B.E.D, an acronym for the member's first initials, was recorded from 2017 to early 2018 in de Crécy's Paris studio. De Crécy produced most of the record, with Dury producing the remainder. As a side project, Dury did not think to release it until he listened to the recordings later and his PR agent Matt Fogg convinced him otherwise. In Record Collector, years later, Dury spoke of the experience of being in a band, as opposed to working as a solo artist:

It was fine at first, gentle and easy – we worked very quickly. Once it became real and there was pressure, we turned into a band. Instantly, it fell apart, and I realised why I've never been in a band with anyone else because we all had our own opinions and you really need a pre-nup ... I'm quite bossy, and that's fine on my records but it's a different dynamic in a group.

== Composition ==
In comparison to Dury's previous album Prince of Tears, B.E.D is a departure from the guitar, bass, and drums combination, favouring an electronic approach, consisting of de Crécy's minimalistic beats, basslines, and synthesisers. Meanwhile, the vocals consist of Dury's intoned narration and Holliday's sung choruses, with a few exceptions. On "Fly Away" and "But I Think", Holliday takes the lead vocals.

Lyrical themes revolve around betrayal, disdain, and self-loathing. According to Dury, whom wrote most of the lyrics, much of the inspiration came from "an experience I had in Paris that I can't talk about in detail because there are various parties involved". The album opens with "Tais Toi" (French for "Shut Your Mouth"), a phrase told to the narrator by his lover. On "Only My Honesty Matters", Dury laments about aspects of modern society.

== Single and release ==
On 10 September 2018, the trio announced the album and led it with the single "White Coats". B.E.D was released on 26 October on Heavenly Recordings and on PIAS Le Label. While considered an album, B.E.D is considerably short, totalling nineteen minutes with tracks around two minutes long.

In Dury and Holliday's native UK, the album did not place on the main UK Albums Chart, but it peaked on the UK Independent Albums Chart at no. 21. In de Crécy's native France, the album was a minor hit on the SNEP album chart, peaking at no. 153.

== Critical reception ==
Professional ratings
Aggregate scores
Source	Rating
Metacritic	81/100
Review scores
Source	Rating
AllMusic	4/5 stars
The Arts Desk	5/5 stars
DIY	4/5 stars
Loud and Quiet	7/10
Mojo	4/5 stars
Q	4/5 stars
Uncut	7/10

According to the review aggregator Metacritic, B.E.D received "universal acclaim" based on a weighted average score of 81 out of 100 from 5 critic scores.

In a pair of four-star reviews, Victoria Segal of Q called the album a "Short, sharp menace-a-trois", and Lisa Wright of DIY thought that the three musicians' differing approaches to the music "combine to an unexpectedly cohesive whole ... that's more than the sum of their parts." Similarly, AllMusic's Tim Sendra said that the overall premise for the collaboration "seems like it wouldn't work", but they manage "to fit their individual skills into a cohesive unit"; their sole point of criticism was that it was not long enough.

Rating B.E.D five stars for The Arts Desk, Joe Muggs lauded the trio's "consistency" and "absolute dedication" in not deviating "from the sheer dead-eyed sleaze sonically, lyrically and vocally" and concluded their review by calling it "A sticky, tarry, grubby work of magic". Greg Cochrane, in a 7 out of 10 review for the magazine Loud and Quiet, described de Crécy's electronic backing tracks as "crisp and unfussy", comparing them to Metronomy in their earlier period. In a relatively negative review in the Hot Press, Pat Carty said the record was a "slight step backwards" in comparison to Dury's previous album Prince of Tears, citing the "fairly predictable" accompaniments.

== Track listing ==
All lyrics are written by Baxter Dury, except "Fly Away" and "Centipedes" (by Dury and Delilah Holliday); all music is composed by Dury and Étienne de Crécy.

B.E.D track listing
No.	Title	Length
1.	"Tais Toi"	2:30
2.	"Walk Away"	2:24
3.	"How Do You Make Me Feel"	2:05
4.	"Fly Away"	2:37
5.	"White Coats"	2:03
6.	"Only My Honesty Matters"	2:31
7.	"Centipedes"	1:29
8.	"But I Think"	2:11
9.	"Eurostars"	1:22
Total length:		19:12

== Personnel ==
- Étienne de Crécy – programming, synthesisers, production, mixing, artwork
- Baxter Dury – vocals, production
- Delilah Holliday – vocals

== Charts ==
Chart performance for B.E.D
Chart (2018)	Peak position
Belgian Albums (Ultratop Wallonia)	108
French Albums (SNEP)	153
Scottish Albums (OCC)	97
UK Independent Albums (OCC)	21
