= Allbarone =

Studio album by Baxter Dury
- Released: 12 September 2025
- Recorded: December 2024–January 2025
- Studios: The Church, London
- Genres: Electronic; pop
- Length: 34:32
- Label: Heavenly
- Producer: Paul Epworth

Baxter Dury chronology
| I Thought I Was Better Than You (2023) | Allbarone (2025) |

Singles from Allbarone
- 1. "Allbarone" Released: 6 May 2025; 2. "Return of the Sharp Heads" Released: 17 June 2025; 3. "Schadenfreude" Released: 29 July 2025; 4. "Mockingjay" Released: 9 September 2025

Allbarone is the eighth studio album by English musician Baxter Dury, produced by Paul Epworth. Preceded by four singles, it was released on 12 September 2025 through Heavenly Recordings.

== Background and recording ==
While on tour in promotion for his album I Thought I Was Better Than You (2023), Dury met the producer Paul Epworth (Adele, U2) after a set at the 2024 Glastonbury Festival. Expressing interest to the producer that he wished to make a record in a similar pop vein to Charli XCX's Brat (2024), the pair made arrangements to record at Epworth's recording studio the Church in London, finishing the record between December 2024 and the following January. The duo established a modus operandi that primarily consisted of Epworth constructing the music, Dury writing around the compositions, and then recording, all in quick succession.

In an interview with the NME, Dury explained that the live response to his 2021 collaboration with Fred Again, the dance-oriented "Baxter (These Are My Friends)", caused him to rethink his approach, saying "Before, making narrative-based indie music is a bit of a thoughtful thing and that gets a bit tiring. ... Fred Again.. caused a little bit of a shift and I definitely learned a lot about dance music."

== Promotion and singles ==
On 6 May 2025, Dury released a single entitled "Allbarone" with a music video filmed in Venice, Italy and directed by Tom Beard. Accompanied by the song was the announcement of the album, with details including the cover art, track listing, and release date. According to Dury, the title track was the first that he recorded with Epworth. The song, which features vocalist JGrrey, revolves around the UK bar chain All Bar One, from which the single also derives its title.

After releasing "Return of the Sharp Heads" on 17 June, also featuring JGrrey, Dury revealed the third single "Schadenfreude" on 29 July 2025 with a music video directed by Gareth Bowen and produced by Blinkink. On 9 September, just three days before the album's release, Dury released "Mockingjay", a Hunger Games-inspired track yet again featuring JGrrey on vocals.

Dury later appeared on the BBC Two programme Live... with Jools Holland on 2 November 2025 to perform the title track.

== Release ==
Allbarone was released on 12 September 2025 through Heavenly Recordings. It debuted on the UK Albums Chart at no. 93, faring considerably better on the Scottish and UK Independent Albums Charts at no. 10 and no. 2, respectively.

=== Allbarone (Remixes) ===
On 2 December 2025, Dury released a three-track EP entitled Allbarone (Remixes), containing a remix of the title track by Parrot and Cocker Too, a remix of "Schadenfreude" by Marie Davidson, and an instrumental version of the Davidson remix. Another Parrot and Cocker Too remix of the title track, dubbed the "Meal Deal Mix", was separately released on 30 April 2026.

=== Allbarone Versions ===
On 22 June 2026, Dury announced another EP of remixes, entitled Allbarone Versions, consisting of five extended, dance-oriented versions of Allbarone tracks. The remixes were created by the original album's producer, Paul Epworth, who intended for his versions to be played on the dancefloor. The announcement was accompanied by the "Alpha Dog" remix; upon full release, the EP will also include "Kubla Khan", "Allbarone", "Schadenfreude", and "Return of the Sharp Heads". Allbarone Versions is scheduled to be released digitally on 24 July 2026 through Heavenly Recordings.

== Critical reception ==
Professional ratings
Aggregate scores
| Source | Rating |
|---|---|
| AnyDecentMusic? | 8.2/10 (Note: On the critical review aggregator website Metacritic, the score displayed for Beats Per Minute was 87 out of 100, but on Beats Per Minute's website, Allbarone was given 78%. Additionally, both Metacritic and AnyDecentMusic? – another aggregator – included the reviews from Record Collector and The Quietus, both written by the same author, Jeremy Allen.) |
| Metacritic | 88/100 |
Review scores
| Source | Rating |
| AllMusic | 4/5 stars |
| The Arts Desk | 5/5 stars |
| Classic Pop | 4/5 stars |
| Hot Press | 7.5/10 |
| The Line of Best Fit | 8/10 |
| Mojo | 4/5 stars |
| Record Collector | 4/5 stars |
| Rock & Folk | 4/5 stars |
| The Skinny | 5/5 stars |
| Uncut | 9/10 |

According to the review aggregator Metacritic, Allbarone received "universal acclaim" based on a weighted average score of 88 out of 100 from 10 critic scores. AnyDecentMusic?, another aggregator, gave it an average of 8.2 out of 10 based on 12 critical reviews.

In a 9 out of 10 review for Uncut magazine, Daniel Dylan Wray said that while "Dury's wry, sardonic and comical wordplay is still plentiful", the songs "are really boosted and supercharged here by Epworth's electronic touch. It's a highly potent and undeniably successful combination." AllMusic's Tim Sendra said, "The smooth textures, state of the art synths, and shimmering atmosphere Epworth creates is the perfect setting for Dury's stories of decadence, regret, and rage. ... This record plays like his shot for glory, and with tracks as hooky and well-constructed as "Mockingjay" or the title track, there's no reason he shouldn't hit the big time." In Mojo, Jim Wirth called Allbarone "Dazzle-bright and direct," adding that it "might lack the intimacy of its immediate predecessors, but Epworth helps to deliver a more powerful (if slightly less cerebral) hit." In The Line of Best Fit, Janne Oinonen considering it to be "a deeply satisfying, simultaneously deeply daft and strangely profound cross-pollination of belly-laughs and tear-stained tragedy", and while "Dury undeniably shares the family trait of loving the sound, texture, feel and taste of words and phrases, ... the scenarios depicted throughout Allbarone could only possibly derive from Baxter Dury's vivid and potently odd imagination."

In Record Collector, Jeremy Allen thought that "Allbarone sees Dury bouncing back ... with his most compelling album" since Prince of Tears (2017), and in The Quietus, Allen also thought that it is his most "cohesive" since then, arguing that Epworth's contributions were musically well-suited to Dury's sensibilities and that the record is "the rawest and truest manifestation of Baxter Dury yet." In The Skinny, Jamie Wilde went as far as to call it "the best work of their career", elaborating in a five star review that "You get the sense that Allbarone is an album that Dury has always had in his locker. Now it's come to fruition, Aylesbury's own Serge Gainsbourg shines more singular, enigmatic and full of life than ever." Kathryn Reilly of The Arts Desk—whose favourite album of 2023 was Dury's I Thought I Was Better Than You—found Allbarone "much more immediately digestible" than its predecessor and praised JGrrey's "soaring vocals" for "helping to balance Dury's bleakness. It's particularly powerful when she sings some of his unfiltered lyrics in the sweetest of ways".

=== Year-end lists ===
| Publication | List | Rank | Ref. |
|---|---|---|---|
| AllMusic | Favorite Singer/Songwriter Albums | N/A | |
| Mojo | The 75 Best Albums of 2025 | 21 | |
| PopMatters | The 80 Best Albums of 2025 | 30 | |
| Record Collector | The Best of 2025: New Albums Top 25 | 10 | |
| Uncut | Best New Albums of 2025 | 19 | |
| Under the Radar | Top 100 Albums of 2025 | 44 | |

== Track listing ==
All tracks are written by Baxter Dury and Paul Epworth, except "The Other Me" (Baxter Dury) and "Hapsburg" and "Mr W4" (Baxter Dury, Epworth, and Kosmo Dury).

Allbarone track listing
| No. | Title | Length |
|---|---|---|
| 1. | "Allbarone" (with JGrrey) | 4:28 |
| 2. | "Schadenfreude" | 3:30 |
| 3. | "Kubla Khan" | 3:08 |
| 4. | "Alpha Dog" | 4:30 |
| 5. | "The Other Me" | 2:13 |
| 6. | "Hapsburg" | 4:50 |
| 7. | "Return of the Sharp Heads" (with JGrrey) | 5:05 |
| 8. | "Mockingjay" (with JGrrey) | 3:01 |
| 9. | "Mr W4" | 3:47 |
| Total length: | | 34:32 |

== Personnel ==
Credits adapted from the CD liner notes.

=== Musicians ===
- Baxter Dury – vocals
- Paul Epworth – programming, percussion, synthesisers, guitar, Mellotron, vocals
- JGrrey – vocals (1, 4–8)
- Fabienne Débarre – vocals (2, 9), synthesisers (4–6)
- Madelaine Hart – vocals (4, 6, 9)
- Georgie Jesson – vocals (3, 5)
- Damon Reece – drums (4–5, 7), percussion (6)
- Billy Fuller – bass (4–9)
- Mike Moore – guitar (4)
- Luke Pickering – percussion, vocals (4–5, 9)
- Kosmo Dury – vocals (9)

=== Technical and design ===
- Paul Epworth – production
- Luke Pickering – engineering
- David Wrench – mixing
- Matt Colton – mastering
- Tom Beard – photography
- Margaux Ract – design

== Charts ==
Chart performance for Allbarone
| Chart (2025) | Peak position |
|---|---|
| French Albums (SNEP) | 127 |
| French Rock & Metal Albums (SNEP) | 9 |
| Scottish Albums (OCC) | 10 |
| UK Albums (OCC) | 93 |
| UK Independent Albums (OCC) | 2 |
