= Young God =

Young God or Young Gods may refer to:

- Young God Records
- Young God (EP), by Swans
- The Young Gods, a band
- Young Gods (comics), a group of superheroes in the Marvel Universe
- Young God (producer), one half of hip-hop production duo Blue Sky Black Death
- Young Gods (film), a 2003 Finnish film
- "Young God", a song by Halsey from Badlands
- "Young Gods", a song by Baxter Dury from Floor Show
- "Young Gods", a song by Devin Townsend from Transcendence
- Young Gods, 1991 album by Little Angels
