= Am I Wrong (disambiguation) =

"Am I Wrong" is a 2013 song by Nico & Vinz.

Am I Wrong may also refer to:

== Music ==
- "Am I Wrong" (Étienne de Crécy song), 2000
- "Am I Wrong", a 1988 song by Witness
- "Am I Wrong", a 1994 song by Keb' Mo' from Keb' Mo'
- "Am I Wrong", a 1994 song by Love Spit Love from Love Spit Love
- Am I Wrong?, a 1998 album by Gitane DeMone
- "Am I Wrong", a 2003 song by Mull Historical Society from Us
- "Am I Wrong", a 2013 song by the Cat Empire from Steal the Light
- "Am I Wrong", a 2015 song by Anderson .Paak from Malibu
- "Am I Wrong", a 2016 song by BTS from Wings

== Other uses ==
- Am I Wrong, a sister website of Am I Right

== See also ==
- "Am I Very Wrong?", a song by Genesis from the 1969 album From Genesis to Revelation
