= Super Discount 2 =

Studio album by Étienne de Crécy
- Released: 27 September 2004
- Genre: Electronica
- Length: 59:32
- Label: Disques Solid
- Producer: Étienne de Crécy

Étienne de Crécy studio albums chronology
Tempovision (2000)	Super Discount 2 (2004)	Super Discount 3 (2015)

Professional ratings
Review scores
Source	Rating
AllMusic	4.5/5 stars

Super Discount 2 is the third solo album by French DJ and producer Étienne de Crécy. It was released on 27 September 2004 through Disques Solid. The album is a sequel to de Crécy's influential 1996 album Super Discount.

Each track title is the name of a peer to peer file sharing protocol, some of which are no longer operating. Production credits are also given to other major French house producers. On "Poisoned" de Crécy is joined by Philippe Zdar from French house duo Cassius. On "Fast Track" Alex Gopher and Julien Delfaud are credited. Gopher also co-produced "Overnet". The late DJ Mehdi worked on "Gifted" and Boombass on "Bit Torrent". "G2" was the sole work of Mr. Learn with de Crécy not credited on the track.

== Track listing ==
Super Discount 2 track listing
No.	Title	Length
1.	"Poisoned" (feat. Philippe Zdar)	5:37
2.	"Fast Track" (feat. Julien Delfaud & Alex Gopher)	7:38
3.	"Grokster"	6:29
4.	"Morpheus"	3:33
5.	"Bit Torrent" (feat. Boombass)	5:48
6.	"Audio Galaxy"	5:06
7.	"Soul Seek"	5:37
8.	"Gifted" (feat. DJ Mehdi)	3:52
9.	"G2" (feat. Mr. Learn)	1:02
10.	"Limewire"	5:51
11.	"Overnet" (feat. Alex Gopher)	8:53
Total length:		59:32

== Charts ==
Chart performance for Super Discount 2
Chart (2004)	Peak position
Belgian Albums (Ultratop Flanders)	70
French Albums (SNEP)	72
