= Sister, Sister =

Sister, Sister may refer to:

- Sister, Sister (TV series), a television sitcom starring Tia and Tamera Mowry
- Sister, Sister (1982 film), a TV movie starring Diahann Carroll
- Sister, Sister (1987 film), a thriller starring Eric Stoltz
- Sister, Sister (book), by Andrew Neiderman
- Sister Sister (drag queen), a drag performer in RuPaul's Drag Race UK (series 2)
- "Sister Sister", a song by Baxter Dury from the album Floor Show
