= Prince of Tears =

Prince of Tears may refer to:

- Prince of Tears (album), by Baxter Dury, 2017
- Prince of Tears (film), 2009
