= Astralwerks =

Record label owned by Universal Music Group

- Parent company: Thorn EMI (1993–1996); EMI (1996–2012); Universal Music Group (2012–present)
- Founded: July 1993; 33 years ago
- Founder: Brian Long
- Distributors: Capitol Music Group (US); EMI (United Kingdom); Universal Music Group (international)
- Genre: Electronic
- Country of origin: United States
- Location: Los Angeles, California, U.S.
- Official website: astralwerks.com

Astralwerks (or Astralwerks Records) is an American record label primarily focused on electronic music that is now owned by Universal Music Group. Its material is distributed via Capitol Music Group in the United States. The label was founded in 1993 and, in its early years, featured prominent British acts like The Future Sound of London, Fatboy Slim and The Chemical Brothers. In recent years, its roster has expanded to include acts like Halsey, Marshmello, Porter Robinson, Illenium, Zhu and numerous others. In 2018, Astralwerks' headquarters were moved from its original home of New York City to Los Angeles.

== History ==
Astralwerks was founded in New York City in July 1993 by Brian Long as an electronic and dance imprint of Caroline Records. Long had previously helped curate an electronic music compilation that was released on Caroline called Excursions in Ambience. Caroline's parent company, Virgin Records, sold the label to Thorn EMI soon after Astralwerks' foundation. The first album released on Astralwerks was Tales of Ephidrina by Amorphous Androgynous, an alter ego of The Future Sound of London. In 1994, Peter Wohelski was brought on as the head of A&R. Wohelski is credited with discovering the Chemical Brothers and bringing them into the Astralwerks fold. Their 1995 debut studio album, Exit Planet Dust, sold 750,000 copies in the United States. The duo's 1997 follow-up, Dig Your Own Hole, reached number 14 on the Billboard 200 chart.

Other albums released under Astralwerks in its first five years included Seefeel's Quique (1994), Soul Oddity's Soul Oddity (1996), μ-Ziq's Lunatic Harness (1997), Photek's Modus Operandi (1997), and Fatboy Slim's You've Come a Long Way, Baby (1998), among many others. 1999 saw the releases of Basement Jaxx's Remedy and Cassius' 1999, the latter of which had three singles peak in the top 30 of the U.S. Dance chart. That year, Peter Wohelski also left his position as general manager of the label and was replaced by Errol Kolosine. In the early 2000s, Astralwerks releases included Air's 2001 album, 10 000 Hz Legend (which reached number 88 on the Billboard 200) and the 2003 re-issue of Motorbass' Pansoul. In 2005, the label released Kraftwerk's first live album, Minimum-Maximum, and a Brian Eno compilation called, More Music for Films.

In 2007, EMI reorganized its distribution arm, which ultimately saw Glenn Mendlinger take over for Errol Kolosine as the label's general manager. In 2009, the label released David Guetta's One Love. The lead single off that album, "When Love Takes Over," would go on to win a Grammy Award. In 2012, the label released Swedish House Mafia's Until Now which featured the single "Don't You Worry Child." The album reached number 14 on the Billboard 200 while the single made it to number 6 on the Billboard Hot 100.

That year, the Universal Music Group (UMG) purchased EMI, bringing Astralwerks under UMG control where it remains today. As part of the corporate restructuring, Astralwerks became an imprint under the Capitol Music Group. In 2013, the label signed both Porter Robinson and Deadmau5 (along with his Mau5trap imprint). The following year, Astralwerks signed singer Halsey to a record deal. Also that year, Robinson released his debut studio album, Worlds and Deadmau5 also released his Astralwerks debut, While(1<2). Halsey's debut studio album, Badlands, came in 2015 and peaked at number 2 on the Billboard 200. Her 2017 follow-up, Hopeless Fountain Kingdom, would top the chart.

=== 2018–present: Relaunch and relocation ===
In 2018, it was announced that Astralwerks would move from New York City to its current home base of Los Angeles. Glenn Mendlinger also stepped down as general manager and was replaced by Toby Andrews. In September 2018, the label announced that it had "relaunched" with a spate of new signings and a new staff at their Los Angeles offices. The new signings included Axwell & Ingrosso and Illenium. Marshmello, another recent Astralwerks signee, released the song "Happier" featuring Bastille which reached number 2 on the Billboard Hot 100 and topped several Billboard charts. In October 2018, the label partnered with gaming personality Ninja on a compilation album that was released in December and featured original songs from Tycho, Alesso, and 3lau, among others. In 2021, Astralwerks and Blue Note Records collaborated on a series of jazz/electronica albums titled Bluewerks.

In 2023, Astralwerks announced that it would enter into a partnership with SIZE Records, distributing all of the label's future recordings in addition to handling its back catalog prior to the distribution deal.
