= Baxter Dury =

English musician (born 1971)

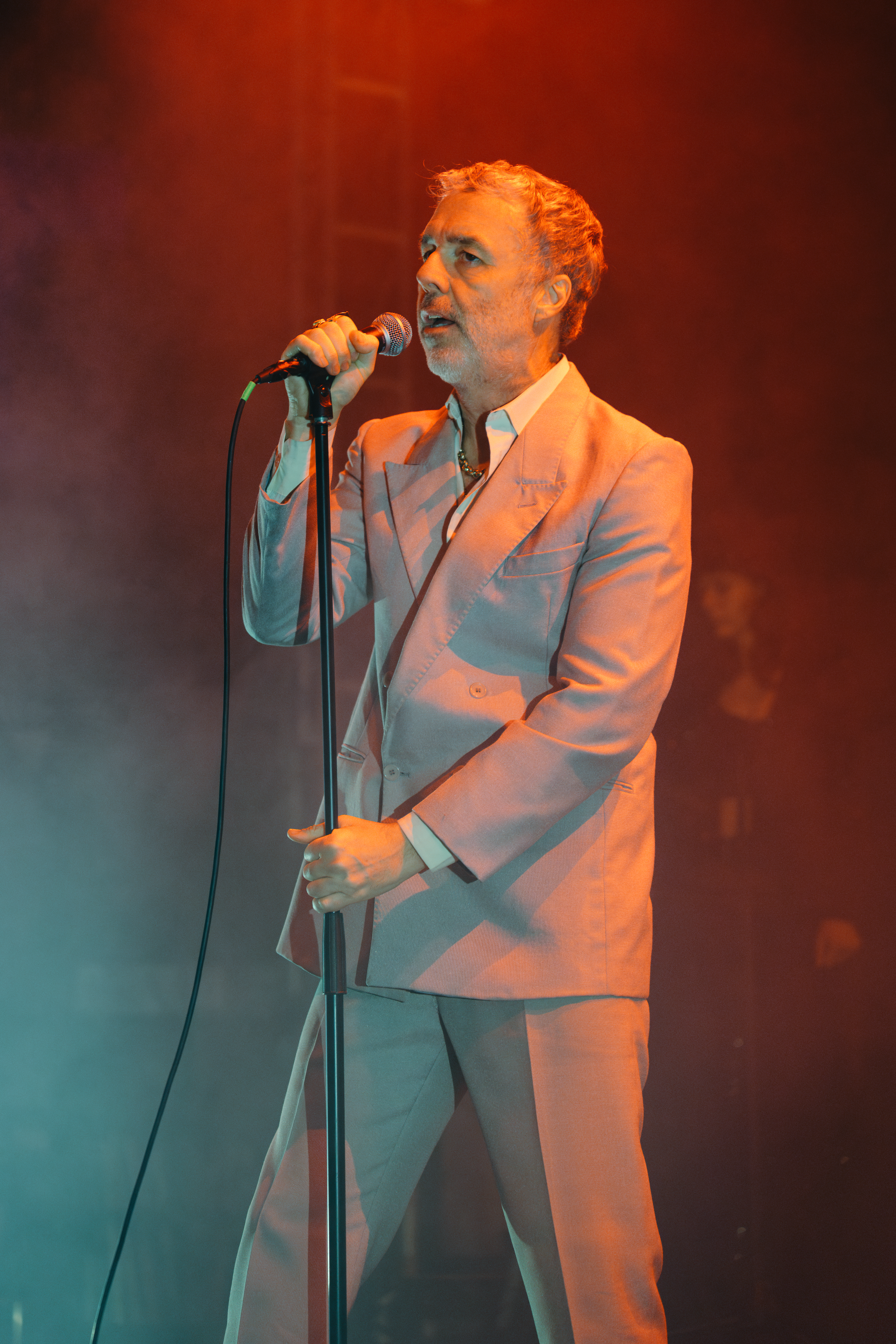
- Dury at the O_{2} Academy Leeds in 2025

Background information
- Born: 18 December 1971 (age 54)
- Origin: Wingrave, Buckinghamshire, England
- Genres: New wave; indie rock; indietronica; alternative pop; post-disco
- Occupation: Vocalist
- Instruments: Vocals, guitar, keyboards
- Years active: 2001–present
- Labels: Rough Trade Records, Parlophone, PIAS, Heavenly Recordings

Baxter Dury (born 18 December 1971) is an English indie musician, originally signed to Rough Trade Records.

== Early life ==
Baxter Dury is the son of Ian Dury and his wife Elizabeth "Betty" Rathmell and was born in Wingrave, Buckinghamshire, England, on 18 December 1971.

As a young boy he appeared on the front cover of Dury's 1977 album New Boots and Panties!! He left school at the age of fourteen. The Ian Dury biopic Sex & Drugs & Rock & Roll (2010) features Bill Milner as Baxter.

== Career ==
=== 2001–2016: Oscar Brown EP to It's a Pleasure ===
In 2002 Dury's Oscar Brown EP was "Record of the Week" in NME.

In 2014 he signed a new recording contract with PIAS subsidiary Le Label and released a new album It's a Pleasure.

=== 2017: Prince of Tears ===
In August 2017, Dury signed to independent record label Heavenly Recordings. The signing was celebrated with a special Fred Perry curated show at London venue the 100 Club, with support from label mates The Orielles. The same month, Dury previewed the release of his fifth studio album Prince of Tears with the release of the single "Miami" alongside a video produced by Roger Sargent. The track was later remixed by Jarvis Cocker and Parrot.

The second single, title track "Prince of Tears", was released in October 2017, also with a video by Roger Sargent. The video depicts Dury being "beaten to a pulp" in a boxing ring. Sargent is quoted as saying: "Baxter trained for 2 weeks to prepare for the video...Though some trickery is involved, 80 percent of the punches are real – and hurt! We wanted that realism to be the spine of the shoot, so that Baxter's acting would be all the more real. It still gets me emotionally every time I watch!"

Co-produced by Dury & Ash Workman and mixed by longstanding collaborator Craig Silvey, the album Prince of Tears was released in October 2017. It featured guest appearances from Jason Williamson of Sleaford Mods (on the track "Almond Milk") and Rose Elinor Dougall (on "Porcelain"), as well as long-term collaborator Madelaine Hart providing backing vocals across numerous tracks. The album received wide acclaim, and was a Sunday Times Album of the Week, Guardian Album of the Week and Rough Trade Shops No. 20 Album of the Year. Writing in The Guardian, Alexis Petridis commented that "Everything on Prince of Tears is a little sharper, a little more pointed than on Dury's previous works." Mojo magazine described it as "a career best album". The final single from the album was "Listen", and also featured a video directed by Roger Sargent.

Dury headlined London's KOKO on 29 November 2017 and went on to support Noel Gallagher's High Flying Birds in April and May 2018 in the UK & Ireland. A UK headline tour in the autumn culminated in a sold out show at London's Shepherd's Bush Empire.

=== 2018–2022: B.E.D and The Night Chancers ===
On 10 September 2018, Dury announced B.E.D, a collaboration with French producer Étienne de Crécy and Delilah Holliday of Skinny Girl Diet with the lead single "White Coats". The album was released on the following 26 October. Produced primarily de Crécy, the album was recorded in his Paris studio.

In March 2019 Dury appeared on the Fat White Family single "Tastes Good with the Money", also appearing in the video. Dury performed live with the band at Glastonbury Festival during their televised set on The Park Stage in June 2019.

On 19 November 2019 Dury announced his sixth studio album The Night Chancers alongside the video and single "Slumlord". The Night Chancers was co-produced by Dury and long-time collaborator Craig Silvey, and was recorded at Hoxa Studios West Hampstead in May 2019. On 2nd March 2020, second single "I'm Not Your Dog" was released alongside a video directed by Tom Haines and produced by Agile Films. The Night Chancers was released on 20 March 2020 to critical acclaim, including in The Guardian, The Quietus, Record Collector, and The Line of Best Fit.

In August 2021 Dury combined with producer Fred Again for the single "Baxter (These Are My Friends)". The same month, his memoir, Chaise Longue, described as "a candid portrayal of teenage life from the heart of rock 'n' roll Bohemia", was published by Little, Brown. Chaise Longue was an Uncut Book of the Year 2021, and featured in the Evening Standard's Best Non-fiction 2021 list, as well as The Times's Books of the Year 2021, and Rough Trade Shops No. 2 Book of the Year, 2021, and was favourably reviewed in the Guardian and the Times.

Dury released the single "D.O.A." on 10 October 2021 and announced the best-of compilation Mr Maserati 2001–2021, which was originally scheduled to be released on 3 December 2021. However, in late November, Dury announced via social media that due to vinyl shortages, the compilation was delayed to 11 February 2022, then it was later delayed again to 10 June 2022.

On 2 December 2022, Dury performed as part of a Concert Celebrating Sir Peter Blake's 90th Year at the Royal Albert Hall in London, alongside Madness, The Who, Noel Gallagher, Paul Weller, and Chrissie Hynde.

=== 2023–2024: I Thought I Was Better Than You ===
On 7th March 2023 Dury announced his seventh studio album I Thought I Was Better Than You alongside the single "Aylesbury Boy", featuring JGrrey. The video was produced by Noel Paul. I Thought I Was Better Than You was produced by Paul White, celebrated for his work as one half of the duo Golden Rules and with the likes of Charli XCX and Danny Brown. The album featured guest vocals from singer-songwriters Eska and JGrrey, in addition to Dury's regular vocalist Madelaine Hart. Ahead of the album, singles "Leon" and "Celebrate Me" were released. The video for "Celebrate Me" was also produced by Noel Paul. I Thought I Was Better Than You was released on 2 June 2023. The record received favourable reviews, and featured at No. 7 in Rough Trade Shops' Albums of the Year list.

In the summer of 2023 Dury supported Pulp on their UK reunion shows at Finsbury Park, Castlefield Bowl and Cardiff International Arena. He toured Europe and the UK, including a sold out show at the Roundhouse, Camden on 18 October 2023.

Tracks from I Thought I Was Better Than You were remixed by Maximum Security, AKA Austin Brown of Parquet Courts, and released as special edition 12" for Rough Trade Shops in December 2023.

Dury performed a televised set at Glastonbury Festival on Sunday 28 June 2024. Dury also played multiple EU festivals including Best Kept Secret, Rock En Seine and OFF Festival. He supported Future Islands at Crystal Palace in August 2023 and performed a main stage set at End of the Road Festival.

=== 2025–present: Allbarone ===
Following a UK and Irish tour supporting Primal Scream, Dury announced his eighth studio album Allbarone, produced by Paul Epworth, on 6 May 2025, with a lead single of the same name. Allbarone was released on Heavenly Recordings on 12 September 2025, alongside an extensive UK and EU headline tour.

== Personal life ==
He has one son, Kosmo Korda Dury (born 2002), whose mother is the granddaughter of Zoltan Korda.

== Discography ==
Baxter Dury discography
- Studio albums: 8
- Extended plays: 1
- Compilation albums: 1
- Singles: 22
- Collaborative albums: 1
- Remixes: 7

The discography of Baxter Dury consists of eight studio albums, one extended play, one compilation album, one collaborative album, twenty-two singles, and seven remixes.

=== Studio albums ===
List of studio albums, with selected chart positions
Album	Year	Peak positions						
Album	Year	UK	UK Indie	BEL (Fl)	BEL (Wa)	FRA	SCO	SWI
Len Parrot's Memorial Lift	Released: 29 July 2002; Label: Rough Trade	—	—	—	—	—	—	—
Floor Show	Released: 22 August 2005; Label: Rough Trade	—	—	—	—	167	—	—
Happy Soup	Released: 15 August 2011; Label: Regal	110	—	—	100	89	—	—
It's a Pleasure	Released: 2014; Label: PIAS Le Label	—	44	163	59	42	—	—
Prince of Tears	Released: 2017; Label: PIAS Le Label, Heavenly	49	4	193	116	65	51	—
The Night Chancers	Released: 2020; Label: PIAS Le Label, Heavenly	73	5	122	—	87	18	86
I Thought I Was Better Than You	Released: 2023; Label: PIAS Le Label, Heavenly	41	5	—	—	200	10	—
Allbarone	Released: 2025; Label: Heavenly	93	2	—	—	127	10	—
"—" denotes a recording that did not chart or was not released in that territory.

=== EPs ===
- Oscar Brown EP (2001)

=== Compilation albums ===
List of compilation albums, with selected chart positions
Album	Year	Peak positions	
Album	Year	UK Indie	SCO
Mr Maserati 2001–2021	Released: 10 June 2022; Label: Heavenly	13	56

=== Collaborative albums ===
List of collaborative albums, with selected chart positions
Album	Year	Peak positions			
Album	Year	UK Indie	BEL (Wa)	FRA	SCO
B.E.D (with Étienne de Crécy and Delilah Holliday)	Released: 26 October 2018; Label: PIAS Le Label, Heavenly	21	108	153	97

=== Singles ===
List of singles with selected chart positions, excluding promotional singles and remixes
Year	Title	Peak chart positions	Album	Ref.
Year	Title	UK Phys.	Album	Ref.
2002	"Gingham Smalls 2" / "Lucifer's Grain"	—	Len Parrot's Memorial Lift	
2006	"Love in the Garden" / "Cocaine Man"	—	Non-album single / Floor Show	
2011	"Claire"	—	Happy Soup	
2011	"Trellic"	—	Happy Soup	
2011	"Isabel"	—	Happy Soup	
2014	"Pleasure"	—	It's a Pleasure	
2014	"Palm Trees"	—	It's a Pleasure	
2017	"Miami"	16	Prince of Tears	
2017	"Prince of Tears"	—	Prince of Tears	
2018	"White Coats" (with Étienne de Crécy and Delilah Holliday)	—	B.E.D	
2019	"Slumlord"	—	The Night Chancers	
2019	"Carla's Got a Boyfriend"	—	The Night Chancers	
2020	"I'm Not Your Dog"	—	The Night Chancers	
2021	"Baxter (These Are My Friends)" (with Fred again..)	—	Non-album single	
2021	"D.O.A."	—	Mr Maserati 2001–2021	
2023	"Aylesbury Boy" (feat. JGrrey)	—	I Thought I Was Better Than You	
2023	"Leon" (feat. JGrrey)	—	I Thought I Was Better Than You	
2023	"Celebrate Me"	—	I Thought I Was Better Than You	
2025	"Allbarone" (feat. JGrrey)	—	Allbarone	
2025	"Return of the Sharp Heads" (feat. JGrrey)	—	Allbarone	
2025	"Schadenfreude"	—	Allbarone	
2025	"Mockingjay" (feat. JGrrey)	—	Allbarone	

==== As featured artist ====
- "Slugboy" by Holybones (2026)

=== Remixes ===
- "Miami" (Dennis Bovell Dub) (2017)
- "Miami" (Parrot and Cocker Too Remix) (2017)
- Say Nothing Remixes EP (2020)
- "Crowded Rooms" (Maximum Security Remix) (2023)
- Allbarone (Remixes) EP (2025)
- "Allbarone" (Parrot and Cocker Too Meal Deal Mix) (2026)
- Allbarone Versions EP (scheduled for 2026)

== Awards and nominations ==
Award Ceremony	Year	Work	Category	Result
Berlin Music Video Awards	2023	Aylesbury Boy	Best Low Budget	Nominated
