= Étienne de Crécy =

French DJ and record producer (born 1969)

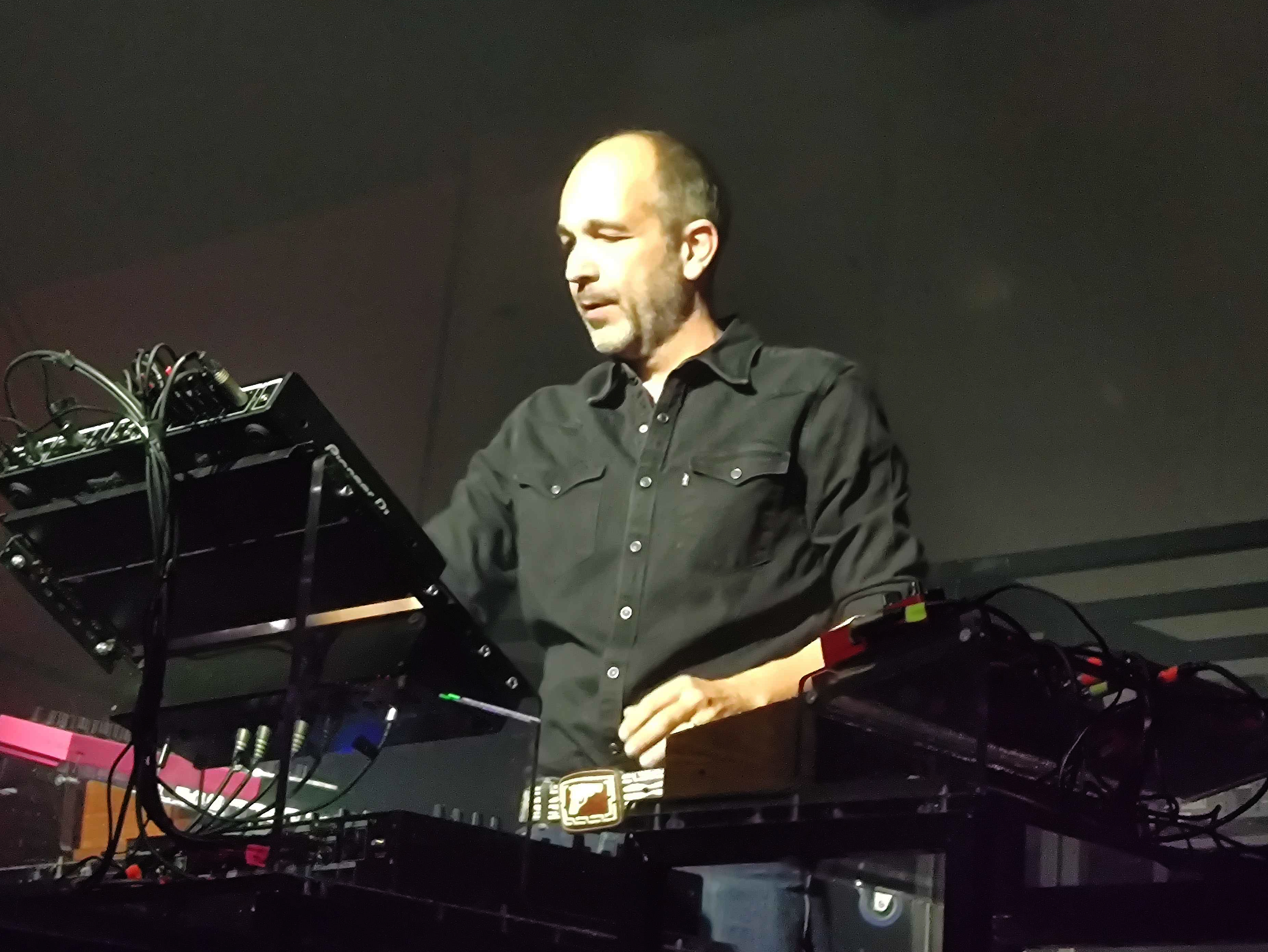
- Étienne de Crécy performing in 2025

Background information
- Born: Étienne Bernard Marie de Crécy; 25 February 1969 (age 57); Lyon, France
- Genres: Trip hop; electronic; downtempo; French house
- Years active: 1992–present
- Labels: Different; Disques Solid; V2 Records; Pixadelic; A+lso; Sony Music; Heavenly Recordings; PIAS
- Relatives: Nicolas de Crécy (brother); Geoffroy de Crécy (brother)
- Website: etiennedecrecy.com

Étienne Bernard Marie de Crécy (French pronunciation: [etjɛn bɛʁnaʁ maʁi də kʁesi]; born 25 February 1969) is a French DJ and producer who produces electronic music, primarily house. He has also produced under the names EDC, Superdiscount, Minos Pour Main Basse (Sur La Ville) and Mooloodjee.

== Biography ==
Crécy was born in Lyon, but moved to Versailles from Marseille in the mid-1980s, attending the same Jules Ferry college as Air and Alex Gopher, with whom he later created the Solid label. He then worked in Paris as a sound engineer at studio +XXX ("plus thirty") where he met Philippe Zdar of Cassius, with whom he worked as Motorbass for the album Pansoul, a preview of what would be his first solo album, Super Discount, released in 1996, with Air, Alex Gopher and other French artists on Solid. De Crécy has been involved in various music projects where he worked as a producer.

== Releases ==
Super Discount was de Crécy's first release, including the singles "Tout doit disparaître" ("Everything Must Go") and "Prix Choc" ("Shock Price").

Four years after Super Discount, de Crécy released Tempovision. Unlike Super Discount, Tempovision is a mature album. In de Crécy's opinion it was a blues album, differing from some of his earlier and more recent work.

The Tempovision track "Am I Wrong" used a sample of Millie Jackson's voice singing "Am I wrong to hunger...", from the song "(If Loving You Is Wrong) I Don't Want to Be Right". "Am I Wrong" peaked at No. 44 on the UK Singles Chart in January 2001.

The three 3D animated videos to accompany singles from the Tempovision album were directed by Étienne's brother, Geoffroy de Crécy.

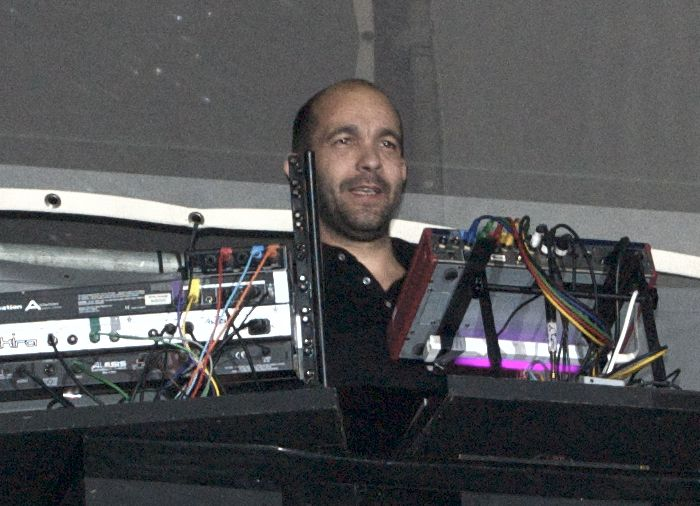
Étienne de Crécy live at Scopitone, Nantes in 2008

Eight years after the first Super Discount album came Super Discount 2 with the original team, and the addition of Cassius. For this album, he used only old analog instruments, for example a TB-303, and produced twelve electro-house-pop-new wave songs designed for clubs, in the continuity of the first Super Discount. Pursuing the 'discount' concept of the first album, all the tracks are named after peer-to-peer clients: "Overnet", "Limewire", and so on.

De Crécy's more recent tracks have focused more on an electronic sound. They had also begun to be released on the Pixadelic label.

== Selected discography ==
Étienne de Crécy discography
- Étienne de Crécy's logo
- Studio albums: 5
- Extended plays: 19
- Live albums: 2
- Compilation albums: 2
- Remix albums: 2
- Singles: 15

The discography of Étienne de Crécy consists of five studio albums, two live albums, two compilation albums, eighteen extended plays and fifteen singles.

=== Studio albums ===
- Super Discount (1997, Different)
- Tempovision (2000, Solid) - FR No. 57
- Super Discount 2 (2004, Solid) - FR No. 72, BE (FL) No. 70
- Super Discount 3 (2015, Pixadelic/A+LSO/Sony Music) - FR No. 40, BE (FL) No. 56, BE (WA) No. 103, SWI No. 99
- Warm Up (2025, Pixadelic, collaboration with Alexis Taylor, Peter von Poehl, Master Peace, Frank Leone, Olivia Merilahti, Sports, Sugar Pit, Kero Kero Bonito, Caroline Rose and Damon Albarn)

=== Collaborative albums ===
- B.E.D (2018, PIAS, collaboration with Baxter Dury and Delilah Holliday) - FR No. 153, BE (WA) No. 108

=== Live albums ===
- Live on Neptune (2007, Pixadelic) (digital only)
- Space Echo (Live) (2019)

=== Compilation albums ===
- Beats'n'Cubes Vol. 1 (2011, Dim Mak)
- My Contribution to the Global Warming (2012, Pixadelic)

=== Remix albums ===
- Tempovision Remixes (2002, Solid)
- Warm Up Remixes (2026, Pixadelic)

=== Singles and EPs ===
| Year | Title | Chart positions | | | | Album |
| Year | Title | FR | BE | NL | UK | Album |
|---|---|---|---|---|---|---|
| 1997 | "Le Patron Est Devenu Fou!" | — | — | — | 118 | Super Discount |
| 1998 | Super Discount – ¥ | — | — | — | — | Super Discount |
| 1998 | Super Discount – F | — | — | — | — | Super Discount |
| 1998 | Super Discount – $ | — | — | — | — | Super Discount |
| 1998 | Super Discount – £ | — | — | — | — | Super Discount |
| 1998 | "Prix Choc (Remixes)" | — | — | — | 60 | Super Discount |
| 2000 | "Am I Wrong" | — | 15 (WA) | — | 44 | Tempovision |
| 2000 | "3 Day Week-End" | — | — | — | — | Tempovision |
| 2001 | "Scratched" | — | — | 96 | 80 | Tempovision |
| 2001 | "Tempovision" | — | — | — | — | Tempovision |
| 2004 | Super Discount 2 – ¥ | — | — | — | — | Super Discount 2 |
| 2004 | Super Discount 2 – € | — | — | — | — | Super Discount 2 |
| 2004 | Super Discount 2 – $ | — | — | — | — | Super Discount 2 |
| 2004 | Super Discount 2 – £ | — | — | — | — | Super Discount 2 |
| 2005 | "Someone Like You" (Fast Track Vocal Mix) | — | 8 (FL) | — | 140 | Super Discount 2 |
| 2006 | Commercial E.P.1 | — | — | — | — | |
| 2007 | Commercial E.P.2 | — | — | — | — | |
| 2009 | "Hannukah" (with Monsieur Jo) | — | — | — | — | |
| 2010 | Welcome EP | — | — | — | — | |
| 2010 | Hope EP | 94 | — | — | — | |
| 2010 | Binary EP | 84 | — | — | — | |
| 2010 | No Brain EP | — | — | — | — | |
| 2011 | "All Right" (digital only) | — | — | — | — | |
| 2013 | "Beatcrush" | — | — | — | — | |
| 2014 | "Hashtag My Ass" (digital only) | 181 | — | — | — | Super Discount 3 |
| 2014 | "Night (Cut the Crap)" (digital only) | — | — | — | — | Super Discount 3 |
| 2014 | "You" (featuring Madeline Follin) | 121 | 40 (FL) | — | — | Super Discount 3 |
| 2015 | "Smile" (with Alex Gopher) | 96 | — | — | — | Super Discount 3 |
| 2015 | "New Wave" (with Jason Glasser – digital only) | — | — | — | — | |
| 2017 | After EP 1 | — | — | — | — | |
| 2017 | After EP 2 | — | — | — | — | |
| 2017 | After EP 3 | — | — | — | — | |
| 2018 | After EP 4 | — | — | — | — | |
| 2021 | Commercial E.P.3 | — | — | — | — | |
| 2026 | "Sexy Magic" (with Ca7riel & Paco Amoroso, PinkPantheress, and Fred Again) | — | — | — | — | Grand Theft Auto VI: The Album |
