= Tempovision =

Studio album by Étienne de Crécy
- Released: 23 October 2000
- Genre: French house
- Length: 59:55
- Label: Disques Solid; V2
- Producer: Étienne de Crécy

Étienne de Crécy studio albums chronology
Super Discount (1996)	Tempovision (2000)	Super Discount 2 (2004)

Tempovision is the second studio album by French DJ and producer Étienne de Crécy, released on 23 October 2000 through Disques Solid and V2 Records. It includes the singles "Am I Wrong", "Scratched" and "Tempovision", which had 3D computer-animated videos made for them by de Crécy's brother, Geoffroy de Crécy. "Am I Wrong" and "Scratched" charted at numbers 44 and 80 on the UK Singles Chart, respectively.

== Critical reception ==
Professional ratings
Review scores
Source	Rating
AllMusic	4/5 stars

Dean Carlson of AllMusic wrote that "Squiggling past looping divas, afternoon glares, and funkadelic body bops, De Crecy manages to manufacture a trail of songs that reach for that Anglo-French brass ring with nothing but admirable gravitas". He found "Out of My Hands" to have "bouncing squelches in the Zombie Nation-vein" and "Relax" to have "classically skewed big beat stomps", and concluded that the album is "probably a response to seeing De Crecy's own Air/Daft Punk disciples get the coiffured crossover treatment", hence its "pop diva production". Blender felt that listening to the album is "all in all, time well spent".

Reviewing the album for musicOMH, Michael Hubbard found that "really on the whole it is chill-out room material, full of time signature changes (When Jack Met Jill) and random relaxing rhythms (Noname)", calling "Am I Wrong" the exception as it is "full of flangey synth, a riotous beat, diva-esque backing vocals and funky bass". Hubbard concluded that the listener should "switch off the lights and let [their] mind switch off", as "it is in such an environment that Tempovision comes across best".

== Track listing ==
Tempovision track listing
No.	Title	Length
1.	"Intronection"	0:53
2.	"Relax"	3:58
3.	"Out of My Hands"	5:15
4.	"Am I Wrong"	3:51
5.	"Noname"	4:51
6.	"When Jack Met Jill"	5:35
7.	"Tempovision"	6:11
8.	"Scratched"	4:03
9.	"3 Day Week-End"	6:37
10.	"Rhythm & Beat"	4:32
11.	"Hold the Line"	14:09
Total length:		59:55

Sample credits

- Tracks 2, 6, 7 and 8 include vocals by Belita Woods.
- "Out of My Hands" contains a sample of "I Don't Want to Do Wrong" by Esther Phillips.
- "Am I Wrong" contains a sample of "(If Loving You Is Wrong) I Don't Want to Be Right" by Millie Jackson.
- "Tempovision" and "Hold the Line" contain a sample of "From a Whisper to a Scream" by Esther Phillips.
- "Tempovision" also contains a sample of "To Lay Down Beside You" by Esther Phillips.
- "3 Day Week-End" contains a sample of "What Went Wrong Last Night" by Millie Jackson.

== Charts ==
Chart performance for Tempovision
Chart (2000)	Peak position
French Albums (SNEP)	57
