= Warm Up (album) =

Studio album by Étienne de Crécy
- Released: 14 March 2025
- Genres: French house; electropop
- Length: 38:44
- Label: Pixadelic
- Producer: Étienne de Crécy

Étienne de Crécy studio albums chronology
B.E.D (2018)	Warm Up (2025)

Professional ratings
Review scores
Source	Rating
MusicOMH	3.5/5 stars
Ondarock	7/10

Warm Up is the fifth solo studio album by French DJ and producer Étienne de Crécy, released on 14 March 2025 through Pixadelic. It serves as his first album since his work on the collaborative album B.E.D (2018). The album features artists such as Alexis Taylor, Master Peace, Olivia Merilahti, Kero Kero Bonito, Caroline Rose, and Damon Albarn.

== Track listing ==
Warm Up track listing
No.	Title	Length
1.	"World Away" (featuring Alexis Taylor)	4:28
2.	"Brass Band" (with Peter von Poehl)	3:29
3.	"With You" (featuring Frank Leone and Master Peace)	2:52
4.	"Karma" (featuring Olivia Merilahti)	3:20
5.	"Take It Back" (featuring Sports)	3:34
6.	"Outside" (featuring Frank Leone)	3:09
7.	"Ignition" (featuring Sugar Pit)	3:32
8.	"Small Screen" (featuring Kero Kero Bonito)	3:10
9.	"Monte Carlo" (featuring Frank Leone)	3:01
10.	"We Can Have Fun" (featuring Caroline Rose)	3:46
11.	"Rising Soul" (featuring Damon Albarn)	4:23
Total length:		38:44

== Charts ==
Chart performance for Warm Up
Chart (2025)	Peak position
French Albums (SNEP)	163
