= The Night Chancers =

Studio album by Baxter Dury
- Released: 20 March 2020
- Recorded: May 2019
- Studio: Hoxa Studios
- Length: 30:24
- Labels: LE LABEL [PIAS] France and Heavenly
- Producer: Craig Silvey

Baxter Dury chronology
B.E.D (2018)	The Night Chancers (2020)	Mr Maserati 2001–2021 (2022)

Professional ratings
Aggregate scores
Source	Rating
AnyDecentMusic?	8.1/10
Metacritic	86/100
Review scores
Source	Rating
AllMusic	4/5 stars
DIY	4/5 stars
Gigwise	8/10
The Guardian	4/5 stars
The Line of Best Fit	9/10
MusicOMH	4.5/5 stars

The Night Chancers is the sixth studio album by English musician Baxter Dury. It was released on 20 March 2020 under [PIAS] France LE LABEL for the world and under Heavenly Recordings for the UK, Ireland and USA.

== Background ==
The album was recorded in May 2019 at Hoxa Studios in West Hampstead, England.

== Critical reception ==
The Night Chancers was met with universal acclaim from critics. At Metacritic, which assigns a weighted average rating out of 100 to reviews from mainstream publications, this release received an average score of 86, based on 13 reviews. The aggregator AnyDecentMusic? gave the album 8.1 out of 10, based on its assessment of the critical consensus. Album of the Year assessed the critical consensus 82 out of 100, based on 13 reviews.

== Track listing ==
No.	Title	Writer(s)	Length
1.	"I'm Not Your Dog"	Baxter Dury, Lee Canham, Shaun S. Paterson, Madelaine Hart	2:58
2.	"Slumlord"	Dury, Paterson, Hart	3:24
3.	"Saliva Hog"	Dury, Paterson, Delilah Holliday	3:06
4.	"Samurai"	Dury, Ben Gallagher, Rose Elinor Dougall	3:22
5.	"Sleep People"	Dury, Gallagher, Dougall	2:55
6.	"Carla's Got a Boyfriend"	Dury, Paterson, Hart	3:47
7.	"The Night Chancers"	Dury, Paterson	3:04
8.	"Hello, I'm Sorry"	Dury, Gallagher, Hart	2:21
9.	"Daylight"	Dury	2:42
10.	"Say Nothing"	Dury, Gallagher, Hart	2:45

== Charts ==
Chart performance for The Night Chancers
Chart (2020)	Peak position
Belgian Albums (Ultratop Flanders)	122
French Albums (SNEP)	87
Scottish Albums (Official Charts)	18
Swiss Albums (Schweizer Hitparade)	86
UK Albums (Official Charts)	73
UK Album Downloads (Official Charts)	29
UK Independent Albums (Official Charts)	5
