= It's a Pleasure (album) =

Studio album by Baxter Dury
- Released: 20 October 2014
- Studios: Tickle Rooms; Dan Carey's Studio; ICP; 290 Ladbroke; State of Ark
- Length: 33:31
- Label: PIAS
- Producers: Baxter Dury; Mike More

Baxter Dury chronology
Happy Soup (2011)	It's a Pleasure (2014)	Prince of Tears (2017)

Singles from It's a Pleasure
- 1. "Pleasure" Released: 9 July 2014; 2. "Palm Trees" Released: 16 September 2014

It's a Pleasure is the fourth studio album by English musician Baxter Dury. The majority of the album was produced by Dury and Mike More, and it was released on 20 October 2014.

== Critical reception ==
Professional ratings
Aggregate scores
Source	Rating
AnyDecentMusic?	6.2/10
Metacritic	70/100
Review scores
Source	Rating
AllMusic	3/5 stars
The Irish Times	3/5 stars
The Line of Best Fit	7/10
Mojo	3/5 stars
musicOMH	3/5 stars
NME	3/5 stars
Record Collector	4/5 stars

It's a Pleasure received a score of 70/100 on the review aggregator website Metacritic based on 7 critics, indicating "generally favorable reviews". Another aggregator AnyDecentMusic? gave the album 6.2/10 based on a different sample of 7 critical reviews.

In a four star review for Record Collector, Jamie Atkins described It's a Pleasure as a "record [that] appears to be the distilled essence of Dury: world-weary songs full of hooks, absolutely no filler, and chock-a-block with memorable lyrics." Christopher Monk, writing for musicOMH, was slightly less positive, stating "there is the sense that this is a very good EP nestled within a merely good album"; Monk drew comparisons to OMD, Depeche Mode and Metronomy. Rating the album 7/10 for The Line of Best Fit, Laurence Day believed the album to be a display of Baxter Dury's evolution since his previous studio venture Happy Soup (2011), adding "Dury's not exactly ecstatic about much, but his newfound nonchalant devil-may-care attitude is refreshing."

In the French magazine Les Inrockuptibles, It's a Pleasure was ranked number 14 in its list of the best albums of 2014.

== Track listing ==
All lyrics are written by Baxter Dury; all music is composed by Dury and Mike More, with additional composers noted.

It's a Pleasure track listing
No.	Title	Music	Length
1.	"Pleasure"		2:22
2.	"Palm Trees"	Fabienne Débarre	4:20
3.	"Other Men's Girls"	Débarre	3:45
4.	"Police"	Débarre	3:05
5.	"Lips"		3:05
6.	"Whispered"	Ben Gallagher	4:17
7.	"Petals"	Gallagher	2:26
8.	"White Men"	Débarre	3:55
9.	"Wintery Kisses"	Débarre	2:25
10.	"Babies"		3:51
Total length:			33:31

== Personnel ==
Credits are adapted from the It's a Pleasure LP.

- Baxter Dury – vocals, keyboards, drums (track 4)
- Mike More – guitars, bass (1, 5, 7–8), backing vocals (4, 7), percussion (7), keyboards (8)
- Fabienne Débarre – backing vocals (except 7), keyboards (except 1, 4), vocals (8)
- Mark Neary – bass (2–4, 6, 10)
- Drew McConnell – bass (9)
- Adam Gammage – drums (3, 6, 9–10)
- Damon Reece – drums (2)
- Adam Falkner – drums (8)
- Patrick Walden – guitar (9)

Technical and design

- Baxter Dury – production (except 2)
- Mike More – production (except 2, 8)
- Craig Silvey – production (3, 6, 9–10), mixing
- Dan Carey – production (2)
- Cameron Craig – production (8)
- Ryan Smith – mastering
- Margaux Ract – photography, design, art direction

== Charts ==
Chart (2014)	Peak position
Belgian Albums (Ultratop Flanders)	163
Belgian Albums (Ultratop Wallonia)	59
French Albums (SNEP)	42
UK Independent Albums (OCC)	44
