= Happy Soup =

Studio album by Baxter Dury
- Released: 15 August 2011
- Studio: The Kilburn Love Cabin; The Garden (London); The Pool (London); Count Brigante's Mountain (Ibiza, Spain)
- Genre: Indie pop
- Length: 35:57
- Label: Regal
- Producer: Baxter Dury; Craig Silvey

Baxter Dury chronology
Floor Show (2005)	Happy Soup (2011)	It's a Pleasure (2014)

Singles from Happy Soup
- 1. "Claire" Released: 1 July 2011; 2. "Trellic" Released: 17 October 2011; 3. "Isabel" Released: 19 December 2011

Happy Soup is the third studio album by the English musician Baxter Dury, released on 15 August 2011 through Regal Recordings. It was produced by Dury and Craig Silvey, with additional production by Cameron Craig.

== Background and recording ==
Dury began recording the album in Ibiza, Spain at Count Brigante's Mountain, continuing in London at The Garden and The Pool and at another studio called The Kilburn Love Cabin. He had decided to retain Craig Silvey as his producer, whom he had worked with for his first two albums Len Parrot's Memorial Lift (2002) and Floor Show (2005). Before its release, Silvey had also worked on records for bands including Arcade Fire, Arctic Monkeys, and the Horrors. Happy Soup marks Dury's first album on a major record label.

== Promotion and singles ==
On 1 July 2011, "Claire" was officially released as the album's lead single, following a series of unofficial releases on Dury's MySpace page, first as a demo in 2008 and later with "The Sun" in early 2010. In a collaboration between EMI Records (Regal's then-parent label) and MetFilm School, ten students were chosen to make a video for each of the album's ten tracks with only lyrics as a starting point, and whomever produced Dury's favourite video was to be awarded £1,000 in cash. DIY magazine separately premiered each video chronologically from 26 to 30 September. Following Happy Soup's release in August 2011, both "Trellic" and "Isabel" were released as singles on 17 October and 19 December, respectively.

== Release ==
Happy Soup was released on 15 August 2011 through Regal Recordings, roughly six years after his previous album Floor Show (2005). It charted at no. 100 and 89 in Wallonia and France, respectively.

== Critical reception ==
Professional ratings
Aggregate scores
Source	Rating
AnyDecentMusic?	7.0/10
Review scores
Source	Rating
AllMusic	3.5/5 stars
DIY	3.5/5 stars
The Guardian	4/5 stars
The Irish Times	3/5 stars
The London Evening Standard	3/5 stars
MusicOMH	3.5/5 stars
NME	4/5 stars
Record Collector	3/5 stars
The Telegraph	4/5 stars
Uncut	3/5 stars

The review aggregator AnyDecentMusic? gave Happy Soup a weighted average rating of 7.0 out of 10 from a sample of 14 critical reviews.

=== Year-end lists ===
Publication	List	Rank	Ref.
Les Inrocks	Top 100 Albums of 2011	13	
Q	Top 50 Albums of 2011	15	

== Track listing ==
All tracks are written by Baxter Dury, with additional writers noted.

Happy Soup track listing
No.	Title	Add. writers	Length
1.	"Isabel"	Ben Gallagher; Madelaine Hart; Mike Moore	3:46
2.	"Claire"	Hart; Mark Neary	3:36
3.	"Leak at the Disco"	Hart; Moore	5:13
4.	"Afternoon"	Neary	2:37
5.	"Happy Soup"		3:46
6.	"Trellic"	Moore	2:55
7.	"Picnic on the Edge"	Gallagher; Moore	2:31
8.	"Hotel in Brixton"	Hart; Neary	3:54
9.	"The Sun"	Gallagher	3:10
10.	"Trophies"	Hart; Neary	4:29
Total length:			35:57

== Personnel ==
Credits adapted from the CD liner notes.

- Baxter Dury – vocals, keyboards (all tracks); guitar (3)
- Madelaine Hart – backing vocals (1–7), vocals (8–10)
- Mike Moore – lead guitar (1, 3), keyboards (1, 5), glockenspiel (1), guitar (5–7, 10)
- Mark Neary – bass (2, 4–5, 8–10)
- Billy Fuller – bass (1, 3, 6–7)
- Adam Gammage – drums (1, 3, 6–7)
- Damon Reece – drums (2, 8–9)
- Jamie Morrison – drums, percussion (5, 10); glockenspiel, xylophone (10)
- Adrian Utley – rhythm guitar (2), guitar (9)
- Ben Gallagher – rhythm guitar (1)

Technical and design

- Baxter Dury – production
- Craig Silvey – production (except 5, 10), mixing
- Cameron Craig – production (5, 10)
- Count Brigante – engineering (2, 9)
- George Marino – mastering
- Tom Beard – photography
- Alex Cowper – design, art direction

== Charts ==
Chart performance for Happy Soup
Chart (2011)	Peak position
Belgian Albums (Ultratop Wallonia)	100
French Albums (SNEP)	89
UK Albums (OCC)	110
