= Am I Wrong (Étienne de Crécy song) =

2000 song by Étienne de Crécy

Single by Étienne de Crécy

from the album Tempovision
- Released: 2000
- Genre: French house
- Length: 3:58
- Label: Pixadelic
- Songwriters: Homer Banks; Millie Jackson; Carl Hampton
- Producer: Etienne de Crécy

Étienne de Crécy singles chronology
"Prix Choc" (1998)	"Am I Wrong" (2000)	"3 Day Week-End" (2000)

"Am I Wrong" is a 2000 house song by Étienne de Crécy. The track is mainly instrumental except for sampling the phrase "am I wrong" from Millie Jackson's voice singing "Am I wrong to hunger...", from the song "(If Loving You Is Wrong) I Don't Want to Be Right". The song was the lead single from his album Tempovision, and its 3D animated video gained significant airplay in Europe. "Am I Wrong" charted on European dance and house charts, and peaked at No. 44 on the UK Singles Chart in January 2001. The song is best remembered for its prize-winning video clip.

== Video ==
Still from the 3D video by Geoffroy de Crécy.

De Crécy commissioned his brother, Geoffroy, to make three animated videos using 3D computer graphics for the album singles "Am I Wrong", "Scratched" and "Tempovision". The "Am I Wrong" video was in large part critical commentary on the food industry and the then current scandal of mad cow disease. The video for "Am I Wrong" was entered in several European film festivals. The video went on to win the best video for 2000 at the 2001 Victoires de la musique.

== Charts ==
Weekly chart performance for "Am I Wrong"
Chart (2000–01)	Peak position
Belgium (Ultratip Bubbling Under Wallonia)	15
UK Singles (Official Charts)	44

Annual chart performance for "Am I Wrong"
Chart (2000)	Rank
European Airplay (Border Breakers)	80
