= Super Discount =

Studio album by Étienne de Crécy
- Released: 16 October 1996
- Genre: House; electronic
- Length: 61:56
- Label: Different
- Producer: Étienne de Crécy

Étienne de Crécy chronology
Super Discount (1996)	Tempovision (2000)

Super Discount is the debut album by French DJ and producer Étienne de Crécy, released on 16 October 1996 by record label Different. Although the track listing lists several artists, the majority of the credited artists are aliases for de Crécy alone or in collaboration. The album was followed in 2004 by the sequel release Super Discount 2.

== Reception ==
Professional ratings
Review scores
Source	Rating
AllMusic	3/5 stars

In 1997, Q ranked the album in their list of "The 25 Best Dance Albums Ever".

== Track listing ==
No.	Title	Music	Length
1.	"Le Patron Est Devenu Fou!" ("The Boss Has Gone Mad!")	Minos Pour Main Basse (Sur La Ville)	10:06
2.	"Prix Choc" ("Price Shock")	Étienne de Crécy	8:51
3.	"Super Disco"	Alex Gopher	6:34
4.	"Soldissimo (EDC Remix)" ("Super Sale")	Air	5:23
5.	"Affaires à Faire" ("Bargains Galore")	La Chatte Rouge	5:36
6.	"Tout Doit Disparaître" ("Everything Must Go")	Minos Pour Main Basse (Sur La Ville)	6:23
7.	"Tout à 10 Balles" ("Everything at 10 Francs")	DJ Tall	0:09
8.	"Liquidation Totale" ("Total Liquidation")	Étienne de Crécy	6:17
9.	"Les 10 Jours Fous" ("10 Days of Madness")	Mooloodjee	8:30
10.	"Destockage Massif" ("Massive Stock Clearance")	Alex Gopher	3:39
11.	"Fermeture Définitive" ("Closing Down Sale")	Mr Learn	0:15

2002 reissue bonus CD
No.	Title	Music	Length
1.	"Prix Choc" (Ultra Dark Mix By Étienne de Crécy)		6:27
2.	"Prix Choc" (Ultra Bright Mix by La Funk Mob)		7:49
3.	"Le Patron Est Devenu Fou!" (Peace From Chicago Mix by Harrison Crump)		9:16
4.	"Prix Choc" (Manasseh's Real Cloudy Mix)		6:03
5.	"Visible, Solution Pour Verres De Contacts"	Mr. Learn & Fisherman	4:22
6.	"Le Patron Est Devenu Fou!" (Video)
7.	"Prix Choc" (Video)

2016 reissue bonus tracks
No.	Title	Length
12.	"Prix Choc" (Radio Edit) (High Mix)	3:55
13.	"Prix Choc" (Free Tax Mix by Alex Gopher)	5:45
14.	"Prix Choc" (Ultra Bright Mix by La Funk Mob)	7:47
15.	"Prix Choc" (Ultra Dark Mix by Étienne De Crécy)	6:27
16.	"Prix Choc" (Cosmo Vitelli Paye Tout Avec Sa Carte De Crécy Mix)	5:25
17.	"Prix Choc" (Roy's Love 4 Paris by Roy Davis Jr.)	8:25
