= Motorbass =

French house music duo, part of French Touch edm movement

- Also known as: La Chatte Rouge
- Origin: Paris, France
- Genres: French house; Deep house
- Years active: 1992–1997
- Labels: Virgin; Different Recordings
- Past members: Philippe Zdar; Étienne de Crécy

Motorbass was a French house duo originating from Paris and consisting of Philippe Zdar (later of Cassius) and Étienne de Crécy. According to AllMusic, their "romping '70s updates released on the Cassius and Source labels have been instrumental in reviving the Parisian underground dance music scene and bringing to it international attention."

== Discography ==
=== Studio albums ===
- 1996 : Pansoul

=== EP and singles ===
- 1993 : 1st EP
- 1993 : Transphunk E.P.
- 1996 : Ezio / Les Ondes

=== Remixes and collaborations ===
- 1993 : MC Solaar - Qui Sème Le Vent Récolte Le Tempo (Motor Bass Mix)
- 1994 : La Funk Mob - Motor Bass Get Phunked Up
- 1995 : Björk - Isobel (Transfunk Mix)
- 1995 : Écouter, Fumer for the compilation Source Lab (with the aliases La Chatte Rouge)
- 1995 : Alex Gopher - Le Turbo Personnel (Motorbass Edit)
- 1996 : Norma Jean Bell - I'm the Baddest Bitch (Motorbass Mix)
- 1996 : Affaires à Faire for the compilation Super Discount (with the aliases La Chatte Rouge)
- 1997 : Herbert - Non-Stop (Motorbass Mix)
- 1997 : Depeche Mode - It's No Good (Motorbass Mix)
- 1997 : Daft Punk - Around the World (Motorbass Vice Mix)
- 1997 : Daft Punk - Around the World (Motorbass Miami Mix)
