= Pansoul =

Studio album by Motorbass
- Released: July 1, 1996
- Genre: French house
- Label: Motorbass; Different; Ed Banger
- Producer: Philippe Zdar; Étienne de Crécy

Pansoul is the only album by French house duo Motorbass, released in July 1996 under the record label Motorbass. It was reissued in 2003 and then again on October 21, 2021, by the record label Ed Banger to mark the 25th anniversary of the album's release. It is credited as being one of the first and most important albums in the French house genre.

== Critical reception ==
Professional ratings
Review scores
Source	Rating
AllMusic	4/5 stars
Muzik	5/5 stars
Uncut	4/5 stars

In its review of the 2003 reissue, Uncut magazine called it "the starting point for the French dance movement, and therefore one of that decade's most important records. Yet the spaces its 10 tracks inhabit are far darker than anything Daft Punk or Air have achieved." Keith Farley of AllMusic called it a "solid LP of retro-disco".

== Legacy ==
Pansoul placed at number 49 in NME's list of "100 Lost Albums You Need to Know". Pansoul was placed at number 10 in Spin magazine's list of the twenty best albums released by record label Astralwerks, in which it was called "the most important album in French house".

== Track listing ==
=== Different CD: DIF 001 ===
All tracks are written by Philippe Zdar and Étienne de Crécy (except tracks 2, 3, 6, and 10 written by Philippe Zdar).

No.	Title	Length
1.	"Fabulous"	6:10
2.	"Ezio"	8:39
3.	"Flying Fingers"	4:49
4.	"Les Ondes"	7:48
5.	"Neptune"	6:03
6.	"Wan Dence"	7:51
7.	"Genius"	5:50
8.	"Pariscyde"	7:06
9.	"Bad Vibes (D.Mix)"	5:18
10.	"Off"	0:55

=== Motorbass LP: MB 003 ===
Side A
No.	Title	Length
1.	"Ezio"	8:39
2.	"Flying Fingers"	4:50

Side B
No.	Title	Length
1.	"Les Ondes"	7:51
2.	"Neptune"	6:01

Side C
No.	Title	Length
1.	"Wan Dence"	7:51
2.	"Genius"	5:50

Side D
No.	Title	Length
1.	"Pariscyde"	7:05
2.	"Bad Vibes (D.Mix)"	5:16
