= Len Parrot's Memorial Lift =

Studio album by Baxter Dury
- Released: 29 July 2002
- Studio: Sanctuary Westside, London; Stanley House, London; State of Art, Bristol
- Genre: Psychedelic; folk rock
- Length: 40:16
- Label: Rough Trade
- Producer: Baxter Dury; Craig Silvey

Baxter Dury chronology
Oscar Brown EP (2001)	Len Parrot's Memorial Lift (2002)	Floor Show (2005)

Singles from Len Parrot's Memorial Lift
- 1. "Gingham Smalls 2" / "Lucifer's Grain" Released: October 2002

Len Parrot's Memorial Lift is the debut studio album by the English musician Baxter Dury, released on 29 July 2002 through Rough Trade Records. It was primarily produced by Dury and Craig Silvey, with additional production by Nick Terry and Geoff Barrow.

== Background and recording ==
Baxter, son of singer Ian Dury, initially sought out a life outside of music. However, by his twenties, after working various jobs including work in a watch shop and in independent films, he began to write songs of his own with Ben Gallagher (son of Mickey Gallagher, a member of Ian's backing band the Blockheads). He nearly had a record deal with Island Records, but after that failed to materialise, he later managed to get the support of the independent label Rough Trade Records when he befriended its founder, Geoff Travis.

Ian Dury, suffering from cancer, died in March 2000, and in April, Baxter performed live for the first time at his father's wake, singing "My Old Man", a song Ian had written about his father. In June 2001, after spending some time songwriting in Austin, Texas, he released his debut record, the Oscar Brown EP in Europe. It was positively received upon release, with the NME awarding it Single of the Week and comparing it to groups such as Mercury Rev and Spiritualized. The title track borrows from the song "Oh! Sweet Nuthin'" by the Velvet Underground. In 2024, Dury told Record Collector that Rough Trade Records had not originally asked the song's writer Lou Reed for permission, and as a result, once Reed learned of the song, he took most of the royalties.

In 2002, Dury returned with his first full-length record, containing "Oscar Brown" and other songs taken from the sessions that also produced the EP. It was recorded in London between Sanctuary Westwide Studios and Stanley House, and in Bristol at State of Art. Some of the musicians who contributed to the album include Dylan Howe and Norman Watt-Roy (The Blockheads), Adrian Utley and Geoff Barrow (Portishead), Richard Hawley (Pulp), Damon Reece (formerly of Spiritualized), singer Johanna Hussey, and Henry Olsen (Beth Orton). "Gingham Smalls 2" was produced by Barrow, while the rest was produced by Dury, with Nick Terry on "Oscar Brown" and with Craig Silvey on the remainder.

== Composition ==
Len Parrot's Memorial Lift has been described as both a psychedelic and folk album, or, more specifically, folk rock. Much of the record leans toward an atmospheric approach, with the exception of tracks such as "Gingham Smalls 2", which is more reminiscient of the pub rock that Dury's father was known for. Lyrically, the album most heavily focuses on character-based narratives on the songs "Fungus Hedge" and "Auntie Jane".

Baxter's often falsetto vocals are generally delivered in a near-whispered tone, a significant difference when compared to his father's vocal style. Contemporary groups such as Mercury Rev and the Flaming Lips were often cited as a stylistic point of comparison to the album.

== Single and release ==
Len Parrot's Memorial Lift was originally released on 29 July 2002 through Rough Trade Records. To promote the album, Dury released "Gingham Smalls 2" and "Lucifer's Grain" together on a CD single in October, which additionally contained the non-album track "Older". The album was later issued in the U.S. on 4 February 2003.

== Critical reception ==
Professional ratings
Review scores
Source	Rating
AllMusic	3/5 stars
Blender	3/5 stars
The Encyclopedia of Popular Music	4/5 stars
The Great Indie Discography	6/10
The Guardian	4/5 stars
Mojo	4/5 stars

Contemporary reviews were mostly positive. In a four-star review for The Guardian, Dave Simpson, reminded of Baxter's father, talked about the "glorious juxtaposition of an impossibly pretty tune" with Baxter's lyrics. Hot Press writer Jackie Hayden said that, "with lots of atmospheric noises, shuffling rhythms and shifting arrangements", the songs "have you on the edge of your seat for most of the album"; Hayden highlighted "Oscar Brown" as the best track and praised Johanna Hussey's "sinister, sultry voice" as "an admirable foil for Dury" on "Lucifer Grain".

In the CMJ New Music Report, Antonia Santangelo said that Dury "effortlessly strolls through character-driven compositions, ... delivering just the lift that its title implies". Elsewhere, in CMJ New Music Monthly, Doug Levy described it as possessing a "masterful depth" and said the combination of Dury's "wistful falsetto" with "hazy melodies" is "so alluring in its sadness, it becomes uplifting." In a more mixed assessment, Billboard's Craig M. Roseberry thought that "Dury's frequent flights into indiscernible falsetto are unnerving, but when they work, they are haunting and mesmerizing", concluding their review by calling the album "bold" but "suffering from too much self-indulgence."

In a short four-star retrospective review for Mojo, Victoria Segal said that "regardless of his parentage, his debut's dreamy psychedelic music hall wouldn't have languished unloved for long." AllMusic's MacKenzie Wilson called it "a meaningful piece of work from Dury Jr." and added that while he "does a good job" in his efforts to establish his own musical identity, "he is Ian's son through and through in a way that music brings alive."

== Track listing ==
All tracks are written by Baxter Dury, with additional writing by Lou Reed on "Oscar Brown" (which contains elements of "Oh! Sweet Nuthin'") and Adrian Utley and Geoff Barrow on "Gingham Smalls 2".

Len Parrot's Memorial Lift track listing
No.	Title	Length
1.	"Beneath the Underdog"	4:11
2.	"Oscar Brown"	5:36
3.	"Lucifer's Grain"	3:14
4.	"Fungus Hedge"	4:34
5.	"Auntie Jane"	4:38
6.	"Gingham Smalls 2"	3:52
7.	"Bachelor"	4:04
8.	"Len Parrot's Memorial Lift"	5:12
9.	"Boneyard Dogs"	4:55
Total length:		40:16

== Personnel ==
Credits are adapted from the CD liner notes, except where noted.

=== Musicians ===
- Baxter Dury – vocals, Rhodes (1–3, 8), piano (1–2, 5), Juno (1, 8), bongos (2), acoustic guitar and footpedal bass (3), organ (5), keyboards (6), Hammond (7)
- Johanna Hussey – backing vocals (1–2, 4–5, 8), verse vocals (3)
- Richard Hawley – guitar (1)
- Dylan Howe – drums (1, 5, 7–8)
- Norman Watt-Roy – bass (1, 5, 7–9)
- Henry Olsen – guitar, bass, and strings (2), backing vocals (4, 7), acoustic guitars (8)
- Andy Peace – drums (2)
- Jason Hazeley – strings (3, 9), keyboards (3), piano (9)
- Adrian Utley – guitar (4, 6, 8), bass (4, 6)
- Clive Deamer – drums (4)
- Geoff Barrow – drums (6)
- Damon Reece – drums (9)

=== Technical and design ===
- Baxter Dury – production (except 6)
- Craig Silvey – production and engineering (except 2, 6), mixing (except 2)
- Nick Terry – production, engineering, and mixing (2)
- Geoff Barrow – production (6)
- Stuart Matthews – engineering (6), studio assistance at State of Art
- Frank Arkwright – mastering at Town House Studios
- Ben Dobie – studio assistance at Sanctuary Westside Studios
- Cesar Gimeno – studio assistance at Stanley House
- Jeff Teader – sleeve design
- Daniel Farmer – photography
