= Skinny Girl Diet =

British political punk band

- Origin: London, England
- Genres: Punk rock, grunge
- Years active: c. 2010–present
- Members: Delilah Holliday, Ursula Holliday
- Past members: Amelia Cutler
- Website: www.facebook.com/skinnygirldiet/

Skinny Girl Diet is a British political punk band, often described as riot grrrl, formed in London, England. The group consists of singer, songwriter and guitarist Delilah Holliday and drummer Ursula Holliday.

== Biography ==
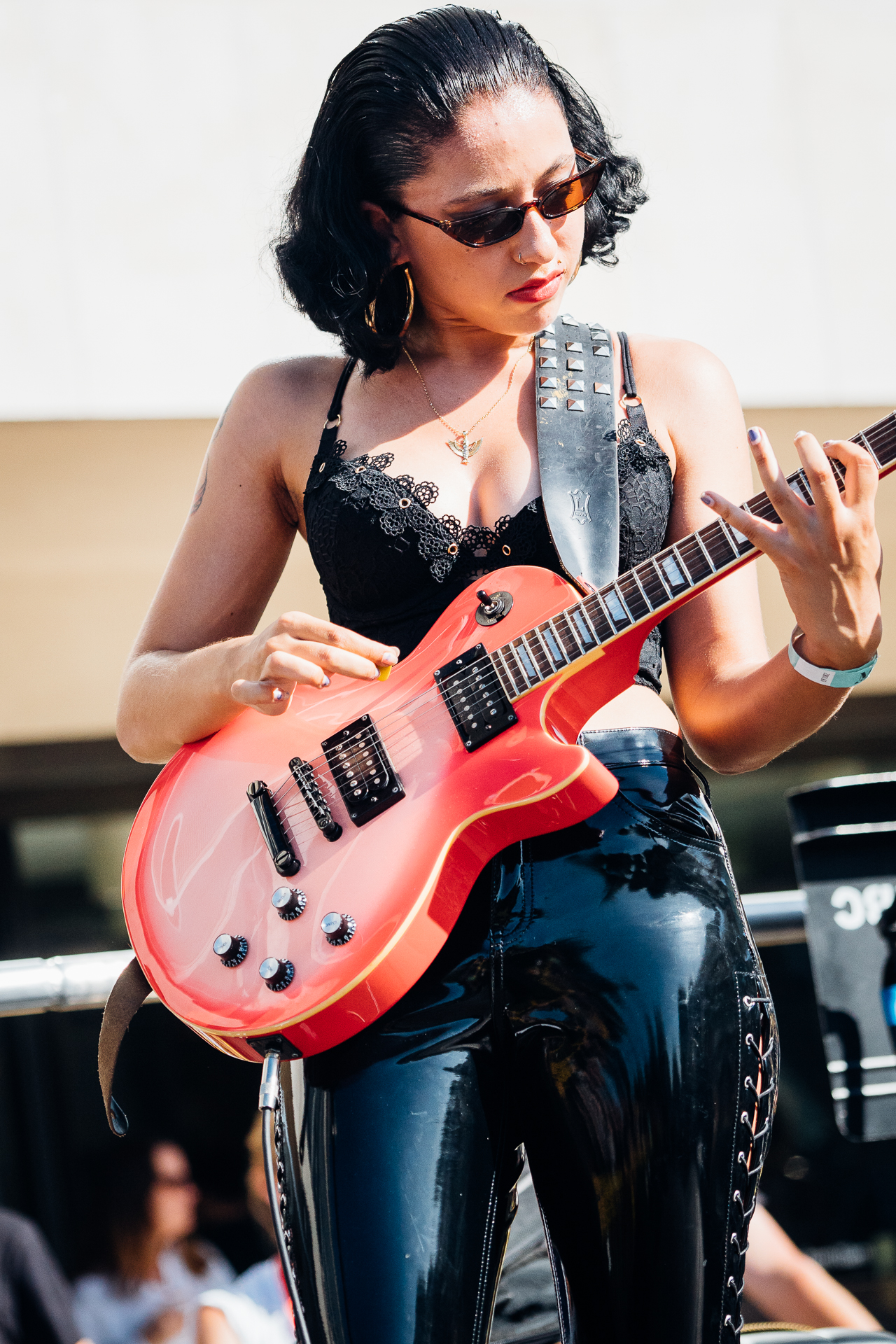
Delilah Holliday as Skinny Girl Diet performs at the 2018 Meltdown Festival.

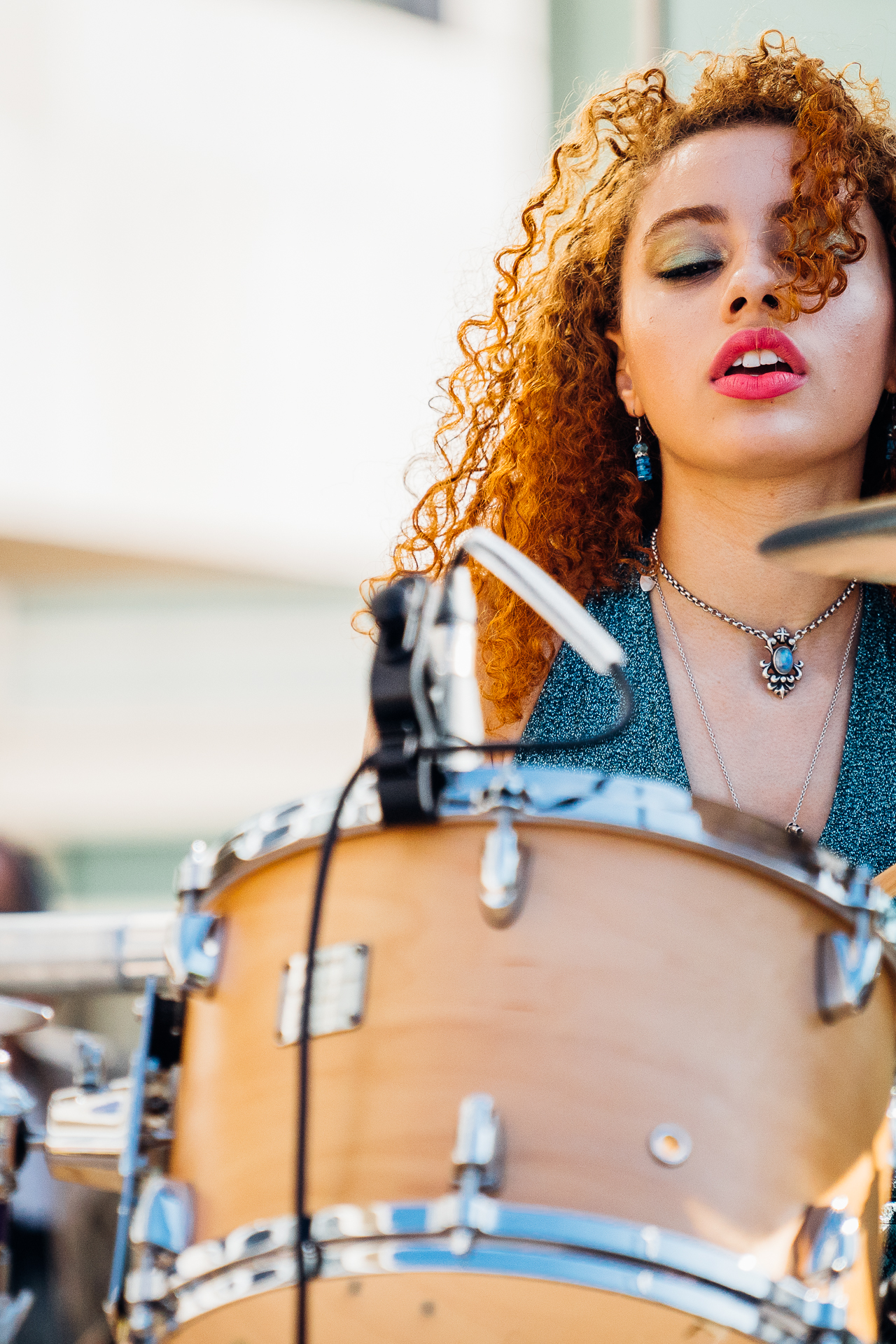
Ursula Holliday as Skinny Girl Diet performs at the 2018 Meltdown Festival.

Sisters Delilah and Ursula Holliday had played together in a two-piece called Typical Girls, before forming Skinny Girl Diet with their cousin Amelia Cutler around 2010 whilst all were in their early teens. The name is a reference to feminist critique of the dieting industry. Amelia left the band in 2017; the Holliday sisters continue as a two-piece.

Skinny Girl Diet performed their first gig in their early teens as the opening act for former Slits guitarist Viv Albertine. Since then, they have become known for bringing an updated approach to the feminist art punk ideals associated with the riot grrrl Movement of the 1990s. They have been vocal about addressing the lack of female musicians that still exists in today's music industry, as well as other issues of equality under a contemporary feminist context.

The group also contributed work to the "Female Matters" exhibition to raise funds and awareness about the fight against FGM.

In 2015, they were featured on Billboard.com's list of "20 All-Female Bands You Need To Know." and featured on the cover of The Beat Magazine's Spring Issue.

== Influences ==
The band cites a range of musical influences, ranging from Japanese metal, punk, to David Bowie. Their influences also include Clara Rockmore, Sister Rosetta Tharpe, Memphis Minnie, MC5, Pussy Galore and The Breeders.

== Releases ==
Skinny Girl Diet released a split EP with the Ethical Debating Society in 2013, on HHBTM Records, featuring Skinny Girl Diet's tracks "DMT" and "Homesick".

In July 2014, Skinny Girl Diet released their EP "Girl Gang State of Mind." They have collaborated with fashion designer Claire Barrow and the pop-punk band Matches, along with producing various DIY zines.

In March 2015, Skinny Girl Diet released "Nadine Hurley" as part of Faris Badwan's Raft Records EP1, along with fellow London bands Niqab, Puffer, and Jet Black.

Their third self-released EP, Reclaim Your Life was released October 16, 2015 on Fiasco Recordings.

Their first full-length album was released in September 2017.

== Discography ==
=== Albums ===
- Heavy Flow - Fiasco Recordings (UK) | HHBTM Records (USA), 12" LP, CD, MP3 (2016)
- Ideal Woman - Fiasco Recordings (UK) | HHBTM Records (USA), 12" LP, CD, MP3 (2019)

=== Extended plays ===
- Skinny Girl Diet - Mïlk Records, Cassette (2012)
- Skinny Girl Diet - Self Released, CDr (2013)
- Girl Gang State of Mind - Fiasco Recordings, CDr (2014)
- Reclaim Your Life - Fiasco Recordings, CDr (2015)

=== Split releases ===
- Split with the Ethical Debating Society - HHBTM Records, 7", MP3 (2013)
- Split with Niqab, Jet Black & Puffer - Raft Records, Double 7" (2015)
