= Prince of Tears (album) =

Studio album by Baxter Dury
- Released: 27 October 2017
- Recorded: 2016
- Studio: Hoxa HQ, London
- Length: 29:43
- Label: PIAS Le Label; Heavenly
- Producer: Baxter Dury; Ash Workman

Baxter Dury chronology
It's a Pleasure (2014)	Prince of Tears (2017)	B.E.D (2018)

Prince of Tears is the fifth studio album by English musician Baxter Dury, released in October 2017 through PIAS Le Label and Heavenly Recordings. It was produced by Dury and Ash Workman, with additional production by Mike Moore. Jason Williamson of Sleaford Mods features on the track "Almond Milk", and Rose Elinor Dougall provides the lead vocals for "Porcelain".

== Critical reception ==
Professional ratings
Aggregate scores
Source	Rating
AnyDecentMusic?	7.2/10
Metacritic	78/100
Review scores
Source	Rating
AllMusic	3.5/5 stars
The Arts Desk	3/5 stars
Clash	7/10
The Guardian	4/5 stars
Loud and Quiet	7/10
Mojo	4/5 stars
NME	4/5 stars
Record Collector	4/5 stars
The Times	4/5 stars
Under the Radar	7/10

According to the review aggregator Metacritic, Prince of Tears received "generally favorable reviews" based on a weighted average score of 78 out of 100 from 8 critic scores. Another aggregator, AnyDecentMusic?, gave it an average of 7.2 out of 10 based on 9 critics.

=== Year-end lists ===
Publication	List	Rank	Ref.
BrooklynVegan	Top 50 Albums of 2017	36	
The Guardian	The Best Albums of 2017	38	
Q	The 50 Albums of the Year 2017	8	
Under the Radar	Top 100 Albums of 2017	49	

== Track listing ==
All tracks are written by Baxter Dury, with additional lyrics by Jason Williamson on "Almond Milk" and additional composers noted below.

Prince of Tears track listing
No.	Title	Add. composers	Length
1.	"Miami"	Ben Gallagher, Madelaine Hart	4:34
2.	"Porcelain"	Gallagher, Rose Elinor Dougall	4:02
3.	"Mungo"	Gallagher, Hart	3:45
4.	"Listen"	Hart	3:04
5.	"Almond Milk" (feat. Jason Williamson)	Gallagher	1:48
6.	"Letter Bomb"	Gallagher	1:43
7.	"Oi"		2:22
8.	"August"		3:03
9.	"Wanna"	Dougall	2:17
10.	"Prince of Tears"	Gallagher, Hart	3:05
Total length:			29:43

== Personnel ==
Credits are adapted from the LP liner notes.

=== Musicians ===
- Baxter Dury – vocals (except track 2), piano (2–4, 9), synth (5–6, 8), Wurlitzer (5, 8), Hammond organ (6)
- Mike Moore – guitar (all tracks)
- Damon Reece – drums (all tracks)
- Billy Fuller – bass (except 7)
- Madelaine Hart – vocals (except 7)
- Ben Gallagher – synth (1)
- Fabienne Débarre – synth (2, 7–8), piano (9–10)
- Rose Elinor Dougall – lead vocals (2)
- Jason Williamson – vocals (5)

=== Orchestra ===
- Joseph Davies - string arrangement and conducting
- Zosia Jagodzinska, Sergio Lopez, Ben Trigg, Valerie Welbanks – cello (1–4, 8, 10)
- Jennifer Ames, Anisa Arslanagic, Richard Jones, Joanne Miller – viola (1–4, 8, 10)
- Flora Curzon, Mandhira de Saram, Paloma Deike, Phil Granell, Adam Hill, Jamie Hutchinson, Rowena Kennally, Clare Taylor – violin (1–4, 8, 10)

=== Technical ===
- Baxter Dury, Ash Workman – production
- Mike Moore – additional production
- Dani Spragg – engineering
- Craig Silvey – mixing
- Greg Calbi – mastering at Sterling Sound, New York
- Jimmy Hogarth – recording at Hoxa HQ, London
- Cameron Craig – recording of strings at The Church, London
- Richard Jones – orchestra fixer

=== Design ===
- Tom Beard – photography
- Mike Title – back sleeve photo art direction
- Alex Cowper – design and layout

== Charts ==
Chart performance for Prince of Tears
Chart (2017)	Peak position
Belgian Albums (Ultratop Flanders)	193
Belgian Albums (Ultratop Wallonia)	116
French Albums (SNEP)	65
Scottish Albums (OCC)	51
UK Albums (OCC)	49
UK Independent Albums (OCC)	4
