= PIAS Group =

British independent record company

PIAS
- Type: Private
- Founded: 1982; 44 years ago in Brussels, Belgium
- Founders: Kenny Gates; Michel Lambot
- Headquarters: Brussels, Belgium
- Number of locations: 19
- Area served: Worldwide
- Owner: Universal Music Group
- Number of employees: 250+
- Divisions: [PIAS] Recordings [PIAS] Artist & Label Services
- Website: www.pias.com

PIAS, stylized [PIAS], is a Belgian corporation that specialises in independent music recording, licensing, distribution, sales, and marketing. The company was founded in 1982 by Kenny Gates and Michel Lambot in Brussels, Belgium. It has over 250 employees, with 19 offices around the world. The group funds and partners with independent labels and artists.

In November 2022, Universal Music Group acquired 49% shareholding of the PIAS Group, then, in October 2024, acquiring the rest of shares owned by the company's founders Kenny Gates and Michel Lambot, effectively making PIAS a Universal Music Group subsidiary. PIAS Label Group (PIAS Recordings) division will continue to operate autonomously, while Integral (formerly PIAS Artist & Label Services) will be integrated with Universal's Virgin Music Group division.

== Divisions ==
- PIAS Recordings, which launched in 1999, is the group's in-house recorded music division, comprising eight labels, headquartered in [PIAS]'s UK office in Bermondsey, London.
- PIAS Artist & Label Services is the sales & distribution division, providing custom marketing, sales, and distribution services to labels and artists on a national and international level. PIAS rebranded its distribution service to [Integral] in 2021.

=== Sublabels ===
Within PIAS Recordings are:

- Play It Again Sam
- Different Recordings, the electronic music imprint with Etienne de Crecy, Vitalic, Motorbass, Tiga, Crystal Castles and Crystal Fighters
- Le Label
- Urban
- Harmonia Mundi
- Inertia
- Jazz Village
- World Village
- V2 Records

== History ==
Michel Lambot and Kenny Gates met circa September 1981 at Lambot's record store then called "Casablanca Moon", exclusively selling records from independent labels, and they quickly became friends.

In June 1982, Casablanca Moon was closed down and they made plans to start an import company named "Play It Again Sam". (Note: as a nod to a misquoted line from the film Casablanca) The company started importing from the UK in October 1982 and was based in the basement of Gates' parents' house in Brussels, Belgium. Lambot and Gates were then respectively 21 and 19 years old. The company was incorporated in March 1983 with a starting capital of €5000. Their strategy rapidly became to be a "distributor" rather than an importer / wholesaler; this meant offering a full range of services to labels, such as promotion and marketing. Their activities were then extended to production through the creation of their own label in 1984.

In 1990, PIAS set up offices in Hilversum, Holland, and took over Vital in 1993 (which was renamed PIAS UK in 2008). PIAS offices were set up in Paris and London in 1994, in Hamburg in 1995, in Madrid in 2000, and in New York in 2013, as well as two joint ventures, PIAS Nordic in Scandinavia and PIAS Australia.

In early 2013, PIAS acquired Cooperative Music (and the Coop-owned V2 Records label) from Universal Music Group, for a fee in the region of £500,000 forming the new business division [PIAS] Cooperative. The same year, PIAS acquired Rough Trade Distribution in the Benelux.

PIAS and Universal Music entered into a strategic global alliance on 9 June 2021. The agreement will see UMG finance PIAS in addition to accessing the company's international distribution network.

In November 2022, Universal Music Group purchased a 49 percent stake in PIAS. As part of the deal, the catalogues of several Universal artists were transferred to PIAS, including Jurassic 5, DJ Shadow, The Dandy Warhols, Texas, and Eels. The PIAS-Universal alliance was further extended with the Universal Music's acquisition of the existing shareholding owned by the company's founders Gates and Lambot, announced on 15 October 2024.

== 2011 warehouse fire ==
On 8 August 2011, during the 2011 riots in England, a Sony DADC warehouse in the London Borough of Enfield which also acted as PIAS' primary distribution centre was destroyed by fire. Most of PIAS' inventory was considered lost including records from the over 100 British independent labels which PIAS distributes. Several album and single releases were affected by the fire, including the Arctic Monkeys single "The Hellcat Spangled Shalalala", the Battles single "My Machines" and the Charlie Simpson album Young Pilgrim. The total stock loss was reported to be between 3.5 million and 25 million units.

== Distributed labels ==
PIAS distributes and services over 100 independent labels including the following:

=== [Integral] Distribution Services ===
- Acid Jazz Records
- ACT Music
- All Saints Records
- Aparté
- Arising Empire
- Asthmatic Kitty
- ATO Records
- Bedroom Community
- Beggars Group
  - 4AD
  - Matador Records
    - True Panther Sounds
  - Rough Trade Records
  - XL Recordings
  - Young
- Big Brother Recordings
- BMG Rights Management
  - Infectious Music
- Brainfeeder
- Bronze Rat Records
- Captured Tracks
- Chemikal Underground
- Cocoon Recordings
- DFA Records
- Domino Recording Company
- Drag City
- Fabric
- Fat Possum Records
- Fearless Records
- Grönland Records
- Heavenly Recordings
- Hi Records
- Hopeless Records
- Ignition Records
- InFiné
- Invada Records
- Ipecac Recordings
- London Philharmonic Orchestra
- London Symphony Orchestra
- Memphis Industries
- Mirare
- Motéma Music
- Mute Records
- New West Records
- Ninja Tune
  - Big Dada
- Nuclear Blast
- On-U Sound Records
- Partisan Records
- Phantasy
- Pure Noise Records
- Real World Records
- Rock Action Records
- Secretly Group
  - Dead Oceans
  - Jagjaguwar
  - Secretly Canadian
- Soul Jazz Records
- Spinefarm Records
- Stones Throw Records
- Sub Pop
- Thrill Jockey
- Touch and Go Records
  - Quarterstick Records
- Transgressive Records
- Transmission Recordings
- Tzadik Records
- Victory Records
- The Vinyl Factory
- Warp

=== Cooperative ===
- 37 Adventures
- Astral People Recordings
- Bella Union
- Blue Flowers Music
- The Point of Departure Recording Co.
- Prolifica Inc.
- Research
- Speedy Wunderground
- Wichita Recordings
