= Floor Show (album) =

Studio album by Baxter Dury
- Released: 22 August 2005
- Genre: Psychedelic
- Length: 35:31
- Label: Rough Trade
- Producer: Baxter Dury; Craig Silvey; Nick Terry

Baxter Dury chronology
Len Parrot's Memorial Lift (2002)	Floor Show (2005)	Happy Soup (2011)

Singles from Floor Show
- 1. "Love in the Garden / Cocaine Man" Released: 2006

Floor Show is the second studio album by English musician Baxter Dury, released on 22 August 2005 through Rough Trade Records and produced by Dury, Craig Silvey, and Nick Terry. It is a considerably darker record than its predecessor, Len Parrot's Memorial Lift (2002), and has been described as a largely psychedelic album, in part due to contributions from former members of Spiritualized. It was met with positive reviews upon release and was a minor hit in France.

== Background and composition ==
In comparison to his debut, Floor Show is a considerably darker record overall. Around the time of its release, Dury had revealed in interviews that before work had begun on his second album, he had been through a breakup with his partner, with whom he had a child. Lyrically, the album's subject matter deals with fractured relationships, drug addiction, and general discontent, delivered by Dury's often deadpan or spoken word vocals.

Floor Show has also been frequently described as a psychedelic album. During the recording process, Dury was joined by a number of other musicians, notably drummer Damon Reece and guitarist Mike Mooney, both of whom are former members of the space rock group Spiritualized. Their presence on Floor Show was described by critic Stewart Mason of AllMusic as a main contributing factor to the album's more psychedelic elements. Otherwise, the album focuses more on a rock-oriented approach on tracks like "Cages" or piano ballads like on "Young Gods". Dury wrote the music to "Francesca's Party", the title track, and "Dirty Water" with Ben Gallagher, who is the son of Mick Gallagher, a member of Baxter Dury's father's band Ian Dury and the Blockheads.

== Artwork ==
In the album's liner notes, the painting on the front cover is credited to "Duncan Poundcake". The name is an alias that Baxter's father, Ian Dury, had occasionally used, such as on the Hugh Cornwell and Robert Williams album Nosferatu (1979).

== Single and release ==
Floor Show was released on 22 August 2005 through Rough Trade Records, and it was a minor hit in France, peaking at no. 167 on the French Albums Chart. The subsequent year, the non-album track "Love in the Garden" was released as part of a double A-side single on 1965 Records whose flip side was "Cocaine Man".

== Critical reception ==
Professional ratings
Review scores
Source	Rating
AllMusic	3.5/5 stars
The Encyclopedia of Popular Music	3/5 stars
The Guardian	4/5 stars
The Irish Times	4/5 stars

Rating Floor Show four stars for The Guardian, Maddy Costa described it as an album that "isn't so much a step forward from his 2002 debut ... as a retreat into the darkest nights of his soul", concluding their review by saying that Dury "knows that the worst always does happen. This beautiful album is the sound of him surviving it." Similarly, AllMusic's Stewart Mason found the album to be "Fairly relentless in its darkness", but praised Dury's lyrics for their "plainspoken honesty" and "dry wit" and said "It may not be an easy listen, but Floor Show is a fulfilling one."

In a four-star review for The Irish Times, Siobhán Long opined that "it's the muted stories that make the deepest impression" and called the album "a whispered gem that'll urge you to tilt your eardrums ever closer." Sam Shepherd of MusicOMH highlighted the "superb character study" of "Cocaine Man" as being the "stand out track", and overall, they thought that Floor Show is an album "you can get completely lost in."

== Track listing ==
All tracks are written by Baxter Dury, except with Chris Newton on "Cocaine Man" and with additional composition by Ben Gallagher on tracks 1, 7, and 9.

Floor Show track listing
No.	Title	Length
1.	"Francesca's Party"	3:14
2.	"Cocaine Man"	3:54
3.	"Lisa Said"	3:40
4.	"Waiting for Surprises"	3:02
5.	"Young Gods"	4:53
6.	"Sister Sister"	4:41
7.	"Floor Show"	3:47
8.	"Cages"	4:09
9.	"Dirty Water"	4:11
Total length:		35:31

== Personnel ==
Credits are adapted from Apple Music, except where noted.

=== Musicians ===
- Baxter Dury – vocals (all tracks), guitar (except 2), keyboards (2, 7), piano (5), bass (7)
- Chris Newton – vocals (except 1)
- Damon Reece – drums (except 1)
- Mike Mooney – bass (except 1, 7), guitar (except 1, 3)
- Rupert Sheehan – guitar (2–3)
- Adrian Utley – guitar (6)
- Jason Hazeley – arrangement (6)

=== Technical and design ===
- Baxter Dury – production, design
- Craig Silvey – production, mixing
- Nick Terry – production (except 3)
- Duncan Poundcake – cover painting
- Jeff Teader – design

== Charts ==
Chart performance for Floor Show
Chart (2005)	Peak position
French Albums (SNEP)	167
