= Evergreen (French band) =

French pop band

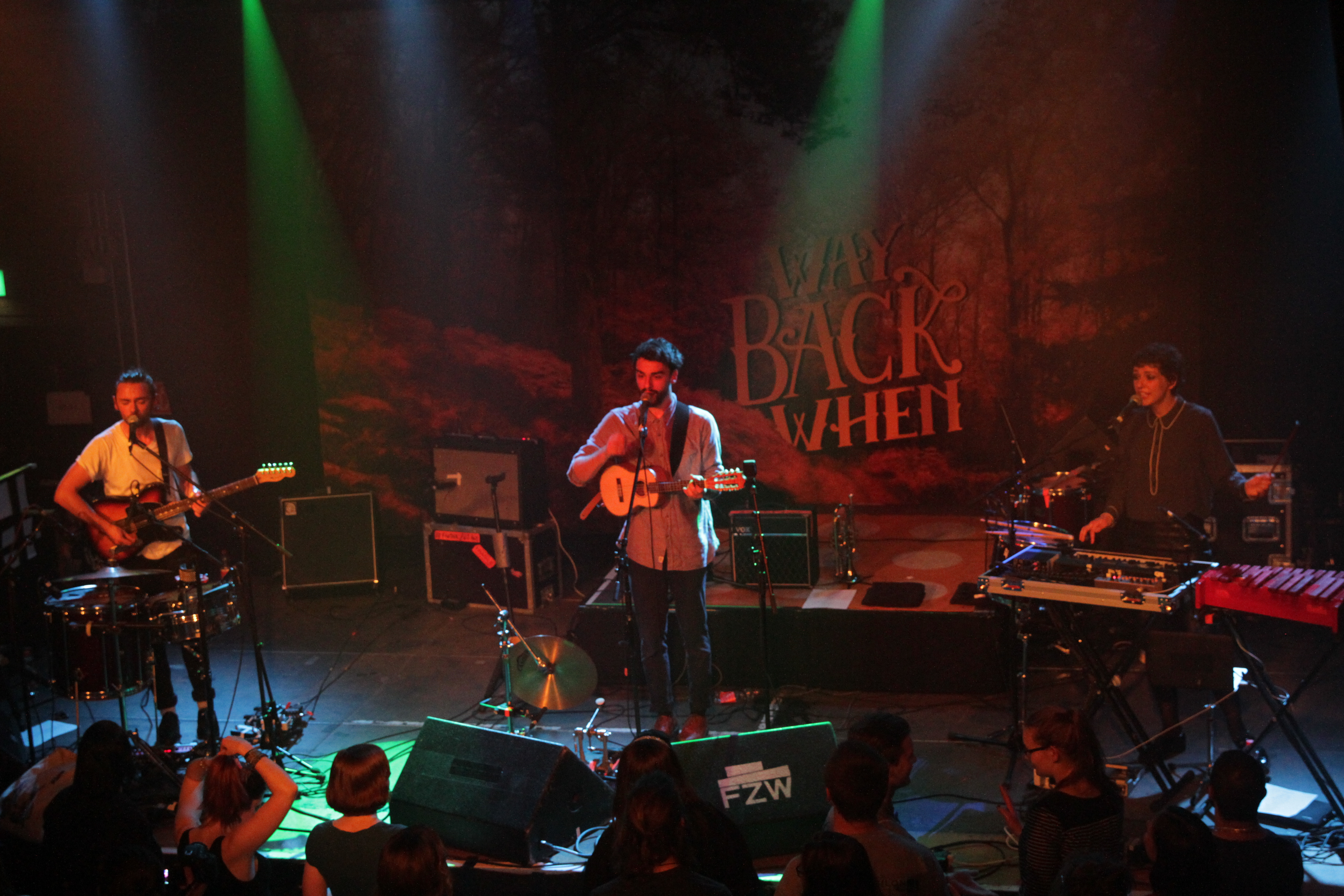

Background information
- Origin: Paris, France
- Genres: Indie pop
- Years active: 2008–present
- Members: Michael Liot; Fabienne Débarre; Jon Reich
- Past members: William Serfass
- Website: Official website

Evergreen (formerly known as We Were Evergreen) is a French indie pop group. The band formed in Paris in 2008 and are now based between Paris and London, UK. They've been described as "shape-shifting pop blend[ing] folk melodies, electro beats and exotic rhythms". Their debut album, Towards, was released on 5 May 2014. Their second album, Overseas, was released on 15 June 2018.

== History ==
The band was formed in 2008 in Paris by then-literature-students Michael Liot (vocals, strummed instruments) and Fabienne Débarre (vocals, keyboards, xylophone). They were very quickly joined by William Serfass (vocals, percussions, bass, electric guitar).

After releasing two self-produced EPs (We Were Evergreen, Flings) in France, they moved to London where they released a third EP, Leeway.

Evergreen wrote and recorded the soundtrack to 2013 French film Fonzy.

William Serfass left the band between the release of their second album, Overseas (2018), and their single, Quarantine (2020).

The band signed with Moshi Moshi Records in 2021.

Their cover of Jacques Dutronc's song 'J'aime les filles' was chosen as the soundtrack to Longchamp's 2023 campaign.

In 2024, French musician Jon Reich, who produced their EP "Sign In" and mini album "Sign Out", joined the band as a member.

Evergreen is now based between Paris and London.

== Discography ==
=== Albums ===
- Towards (2014)
- Overseas (2018)
- Sign Out (2023)

Towards was released on 5 May 2014 by Island Records in the UK and Because Music in France, Belgium and Switzerland. It was recorded and mixed in Brixton's Iguana Studios, with Charlie Andrew (producer of Alt-J, Sivu and Marika Hackman). The album was described as "smart pop that keeps its charm" (Clash), "considered but playful" (The 405), "a sublime, varied LP that's a perfect accompaniment to the impending sun-pecked skies" (music OMH). The first three singles from the album were "Daughters", "False Start" and "Best Thing". The video for "Daughters", directed by Dominique Rocher, is a take on the Danaids myth based on overlapping choreography, and shot in a single take as well as a single room.

Their second album "Overseas" was produced and mixed by Ash Workman in Ramsgate, UK. The album was released on 15 June 2018 by Because Music. It contains songs both in English and in French and is centered around themes such as identity, language and borders.

Sign Out (2023) was released as a mini-album concluding a diptych started with the Sign In EP (2021). The songs from both releases were written during the COVID-19 pandemic and have been described by the band as "a collection of songs obsessed with human connections and disconnections, infused with Y2K-era nostalgia and escapist grooves". Both releases were recorded and produced by Jon Reich, who has since joined the band as an official member. Sign In and Sign Out were released on independent labels Kidding Aside & Empty Streets Records.

=== Extended plays ===
- We Were Evergreen (2010)
- Flings (2010)
- Leeway (2013)
- Aux Echos (2017)
- Sign In (2021)

=== Singles ===
Year	Single	Peak positions	Album
Year	Single	FRA	Album
2012	"Baby Blue"	–	Leeway EP
2013	"Leeway"	6	Leeway EP
2014	"Daughters"	–	Towards
2014	"False Start"	–	Towards
2014	"Best Thing"	–	Towards
2017	"Aux Echos"	–	Overseas
2018	"Comme Si"	–	Overseas
2022	"J'aime les filles"	–	
2022	"At Least I Tried"	–	Sign Out
2022	"Aidono"	–	Sign Out
2022	"Voices In Your Head"	–	Sign Out
2022	"La tendresse"	–	
