= Alex Gopher =

French DJ and audio engineer

- Birth name: Alexis Latrobe
- Origin: Versailles, France
- Genres: EDM, funk, house, dance-pop
- Years active: 1994–present
- Labels: V2
- Website: www.alexgophermastering.com

Alexis Latrobe (French pronunciation: [alɛksi latʁɔb]), known professionally as Alex Gopher, is a French mastering engineer, electronic musician and producer. He worked as a sound engineer at Translab Studio, notably for Angèle, Clara Luciani, Lomepal, -M-, Mr. Oizo, Gesaffelstein and Etienne Daho. Latrobe has contributed a great amount to the French touch movement of the 1990s.

== Career ==
Latrobe began his musical career playing bass in the band Orange with future Air members Jean-Benoît Dunckel and Nicolas Godin. After the group split, he began to create electronic music and embarked on a successful solo career.

Latrobe's musical style mainly consists of sampling, along with recruiting vocal talent. His track "Brain Leech (Bugged Mind Remix)" has been featured in Grand Theft Auto IV, playing on the Electro-Choc radio station. "The Child" was featured in the movie Amélie; it samples from Billie Holiday's "God Bless the Child".

A remix of Jamiroquai's "Black Capricorn Day" was released on their sampler EP An Online Odyssey in 2001; the track in question is listed as "Black Capricorn Day" (White Knights Remix).

== Discography ==
=== Charting albums ===
List of albums, with French and Australian chart positions
Title	Album details	Peak chart positions	
Title	Album details	FRA	AUS
Poumtchak #2	Released: 1997	-	-
You, My Baby & I	Released: 1999; Format: CD, LP; Label: Disques Solid	69	100
Wuz (with Demon)	Released: 2002; Format: CD, LP; Label: Disques Solid	142	-
Alex Gopher	Released: 2007; Format: CD, LP; Label: Disques Solid	146	-
Motorway (soundtrack) (with Xavier Jamaux)	Released: 2012; Format: CD, LP, Digital; Label: Go 4 Music,	-	-
