= Operation Mincemeat (film) =

2021 British World War II drama film by John Madden

- UK theatrical release poster
- Directed by: John Madden
- Screenplay by: Michelle Ashford
- Based on: Operation Mincemeat by Ben Macintyre
- Produced by: Charles S. Cohen; Iain Canning; Emile Sherman; Kris Thykier
- Starring: Colin Firth; Matthew Macfadyen; James Fleet; Kelly Macdonald; Penelope Wilton; Johnny Flynn; Jason Isaacs
- Cinematography: Sebastian Blenkov
- Edited by: Victoria Boydell
- Music by: Thomas Newman
- Production companies: FilmNation Entertainment; Cross City Films; See-Saw Films; Cohen Media Group; Archery Films
- Distributed by: Warner Bros. Pictures (United Kingdom and Ireland); Netflix (North and Latin America)
- Release dates: 5 November 2021 (British Film Festival); 15 April 2022 (United Kingdom); 11 May 2022 (United States)
- Running time: 128 minutes
- Countries: United Kingdom; United States
- Language: English
- Budget: $6.3 million
- Box office: $15.7 million

Operation Mincemeat is a 2021 war drama film directed by John Madden. It is based upon Ben Macintyre's 2010 book of the same name recounting the British Operation Mincemeat during the Second World War. The film stars Colin Firth, Kelly Macdonald, Matthew Macfadyen, James Fleet, Penelope Wilton, Johnny Flynn and Jason Isaacs. This was Paul Ritter's final film appearance, and was dedicated to his memory.

Operation Mincemeat had its world premiere at the 2021 British Film Festival in Australia, and was released in the United Kingdom on 15 April 2022 by Warner Bros. Pictures. It was released on Netflix in North American and South American countries on 11 May 2022. The film received generally positive reviews from critics and grossed $15.7 million worldwide against a $6.3 million budget.

== Plot ==
Lieutenant Commander Ewen Montagu, a Jewish barrister, remains in England during World War II while his wife Iris and their children travel to safety in the United States. Montagu is appointed to the Twenty Committee and takes his secretary, Hester Leggett, with him.

Prime Minister Winston Churchill has promised the US that the Allies will invade Sicily by July of that year. Admiral John Godfrey suggests that Britain deceive Nazi Germany into believing the Allies will invade Greece to prevent a heavy Wehrmacht presence on Sicily. Charles Cholmondeley proposes an operation from the Trout Memo, which would entail planting false documents on a corpse where German intelligence could find them. Montagu and Cholmondeley plan the operation with Lieutenant Commander Ian Fleming.

The body of a vagrant named Glyndwr Michael, who died by possible suicidal poisoning, is obtained and given the false identity of Major William Martin, Royal Marines, with identification papers revealing a detailed backstory. A widowed secretary in the office, Jean Leslie, offers a photo of herself to serve as Martin's fake fiancée, "Pam". Theatre tickets, personal bills and a love letter from "Pam" written by Hester are added for verisimilitude. Cholmondeley has a crush on Jean, but soon realises that Montagu and Jean share romantic feelings. This causes Cholmondeley to grow jealous and occasionally lash out at Montagu. Complications ensue when Michael's sister arrives to claim his body, but she is turned away.

Godfrey suspects that Montagu's brother, Ivor, is a spy for the USSR. Godfrey incentivises Cholmondeley to spy on Montagu and, in return, Godfrey will locate and return the remains of Cholmondeley's brother, who was killed in action in Chittagong, Bengal. Cholmondeley reluctantly agrees.

Specialist MI5 driver St John "Jock" Horsfall transports Montagu, Cholmondeley and the corpse to the submarine base at Holy Loch where it is loaded onto HMS Seraph. The submarine drops the corpse into the ocean in the Gulf of Cádiz and it is located by fishermen in Huelva, Spain. The mission is hampered by bad luck, as the Spanish have resisted Nazi influence more than expected. Captain David Ainsworth, the British naval attaché in Madrid, meets with Colonel Cerruti of the Spanish secret police in one last attempt to get the papers to the Germans. When Martin's personal items are returned to London, a specialist determines the documents have been tampered with, giving the Operation Mincemeat staff hope that Germany retrieved the false information. The team then intercept an encrypted communication from General Jodl who believes the Allies will invade Greece.

Jean is threatened by Teddy, a waiter at a club the team has frequented, claiming to be a spy for a German anti-Hitler plot. She tells him that Major Martin was travelling under an alias but the classified information was genuine. After Teddy leaves, Jean informs Montagu and Cholmondeley. They come to believe that Colonel Alexis von Roenne, who controls intelligence in the German Army High Command, sent Teddy to verify information so Roenne could undermine Hitler but they have no way of being sure. Montagu takes Jean to his home for protection, but she accepts a job in SOE and leaves London.

The Allied invasion of Sicily proceeds with limited casualties, and a viable beachhead is quickly formed. Cholmondeley admits he received his brother's remains in return for spying on Montagu. Feeling sympathetic and relieved that Operation Mincemeat was a success, Montagu offers to buy Cholmondeley a drink even though it is eight in the morning. The epilogue says that Montagu reunited with Iris after the war, Jean married a soldier, Hester continued as Director of the Admiralty Secretarial Unit and Cholmondeley remained with MI5 until 1952, later married and travelled widely. Major William Martin's identity was revealed to be Glyndwr Michael in 1997 when an epitaph, with his real name, was added to Martin's headstone in Spain.

== Cast ==
- Colin Firth as Ewen Montagu
- Matthew Macfadyen as Charles Cholmondeley
- Kelly Macdonald as Jean Leslie
- Penelope Wilton as Hester Leggatt
- Johnny Flynn as Ian Fleming
- Jason Isaacs as Admiral John Godfrey
- Mark Gatiss as Ivor Montagu
- Hattie Morahan as Iris Montagu
- Mark Bonnar as Jock Horsfall
- Paul Ritter as Bentley Purchase
- Alex Jennings as John Masterman
- Simon Russell Beale as Winston Churchill
- James Fleet as Charles Fraser-Smith
- Nicholas Rowe as Capt David Ainsworth (based on Alan Hillgarth, the naval attaché in Madrid)
- Will Keen as Salvador Gomez-Beare (based on British vice-consul Francis Haselden)
- Charlotte Hamblin as Patricia Trehearne
- Lorne MacFadyen as Sgt Roger Dearborn and William Martin
- Rufus Wright as Lt Bill Jewell
- Jonjo O'Neill as Teddy
- Ruby Bentall as Connie Bukes
- Ellie Haddington as Hilda Georgina Cholmondeley

In addition, other notable historical figures are briefly included in the film, with Alexander Beyer as Karl Kuhlenthal, Nico Birnbaum as Colonel Alexis von Roenne and Pep Tosar as Admiral Salvador Moreno.

== Production ==
It was announced in May 2019 that the film would be directed by John Madden, and Colin Firth would star. Kelly Macdonald joined the film in October. In December, Matthew Macfadyen, Penelope Wilton, Johnny Flynn, Tom Wilkinson, Hattie Morahan, Simon Russell Beale, Paul Ritter and Mark Gatiss were added to the cast. Jason Isaacs was announced as part of the cast in March 2020.

Principal photography began in December 2019 between London and Spain. Filming locations include a battle scene at Saunton Beach in North Devon in February 2020 and a scene in Málaga in March 2021.

== Historicity ==
Although the main thrust of the film is historically accurate, the filmmakers made some omissions and additions that were not in MacIntyre's book, including the creation of a fictional sub-plot involving a love triangle between Montagu, Cholmondeley and Leslie. As well, in real life the false love letters for Operation Mincemeat may or may not have been written by Hester Leggatt (whose last name was actually Leggatt not Leggett); according to Ben Macintyre these were written by Leggatt, but Denis Smyth identifies the author as Paddy Bennett, later Lady Ridsdale, who claimed she had written them.

== Release ==
In February 2021, Warner Bros. International acquired the distribution rights to the film in the UK, Republic of Ireland, France, Germany, Spain, Italy and Benelux. The film had its world premiere at the 2021 British Film Festival in Australia, and was released in cinemas on 15 April 2022. Netflix purchased the rights to the film in North and Latin America, and it was released on the streaming service in those territories on 11 May 2022.

== Reception ==
=== Box office ===
Operation Mincemeat has grossed $6,936,873 in the United Kingdom and a worldwide total of $15,710,164.

=== Critical response ===
On the review aggregator website Rotten Tomatoes, 83% of 115 critics' reviews are positive, with an average rating of 6.6/10. The website's critical consensus reads, "If its fact-based story proves more fascinatingly outlandish than it's presented here, Operation Mincemeat remains an engaging and well-acted wartime drama." Metacritic, which uses a weighted average, assigned the film a score of 65 out of 100 based on 27 critics, indicating "generally favorable reviews".

Christy Lemire, writing for RogerEbert.com, assigned the film a three out of four, stating that "The story itself is so absurd and is told with enough surprises and dry humor that it's constantly engaging." Stefan Pape of Common Sense Media, giving it four out of five, praises director John Madden and says "This drama—based on real events—is such a brilliantly cinematic story, it almost feels as if it would have been impossible to get wrong. That said, Operation Mincemeat still required an accomplished, deft hand to bring it to life, and do it the justice it deserves. Thankfully director John Madden more than delivers."

The Guardian's Peter Bradshaw gave it a mixed review of three out of five, praising the performances but criticising it as "another of the 'home front wartime' Britfilms". He goes on to call the film "watchable enough, but [it] perhaps can't find a fictional way into the stranger-than-fiction outrageousness of the scheme itself".

== See also ==
- The Man Who Never Was – 1956 film based on Ewen Montagu's book of the same name about Operation Mincemeat
- Operation Mincemeat (musical) – musical based on the historical event.
