= Hester Leggatt =

MI5 employee (1905–1995)

- Born: Hester May Murray Leggatt; 20 December 1905; India
- Died: 26 July 1995 (aged 89); Chilton, Buckinghamshire, England
- Citizenship: British
- Occupation: Secretary
- Employer: MI5
- Known for: Operation Mincemeat
- Relatives: Bill Leggatt (brother)

Hester May Murray Leggatt (20 December 1905 – 26 July 1995) was a British MI5 employee. During World War II, she was an administrative assistant in the department managing Double Cross agents.

According to some historians, Leggatt contributed false love letters to the deception mission Operation Mincemeat. In popular culture, she was originally portrayed by Jak Malone in the musical Operation Mincemeat and by Penelope Wilton in the film of the same name.

== Life and career ==
Leggatt was born in British India in 1905, the youngest child of parents Ernest Hugh Every Leggatt and Jessie Murray. Her brother, Bill Leggatt, was a lieutenant colonel in the British Army, serving in the Royal Artillery during the Second World War. Before the First World War, her family returned to the United Kingdom, where she attended Tormead School and Wycombe Abbey. She completed secretarial training at St James' Secretarial College in London. In the early 1930s, Leggatt worked as a secretary for Osbert Sitwell and for the Golden Cockerel Press.

During the Second World War, she worked as an administrative assistant for the B1a section of MI5, which was responsible for managing Double Cross agents. According to an account by Jean Leslie, a younger secretary in the section, Leggatt headed the secretarial unit with the utmost seriousness, demanding "absolute obedience and perfect efficiency" from the other administrative assistants.

As the most senior woman in the department, Leggatt may have been tasked with writing false love letters for the British deception mission Operation Mincemeat. According to Ben Macintyre these were written by Leggatt; Denis Smyth identifies the author as Paddy Bennett, later Lady Ridsdale, who claimed she had written them. The letters, alongside fake intelligence documents, were planted on a corpse dressed as a Royal Marine major in a ruse to trick Hitler into moving troops out of Sicily. Although Leggatt was unmarried, and would remain so for the rest of her life, the letters she may have written in the guise of a fictional fiancée named Pam were described as "chattering pastiches of a young woman madly in love, and with little time for grammar".

I do think dearest that seeing people like you off at railway stations is one of the poorer forms of sport. A train going out can leave a howling great gap in ones life & one had to try madly – & quite in vain – to fill it with all the things one used to enjoy a short five weeks ago. That lovely golden day we spent together oh! I know it has been said before, but if only time could stand still for just a minute – But that line of thought is too pointless. Pull your socks up Pam & don't be a silly little fool

— Part of one of the false love letters written by 'Pam'

The love letters acted as corroborative details that helped sell the fiction that the corpse was a real British soldier. The official report on Operation Mincemeat described the letters as achieving "the thrill and pathos of a war engagement with great success". After the war, Leggatt worked for the British Council. Leggatt never married. After retiring, she moved to Chilton, Buckinghamshire, where she died aged 89 in a nursing home on 26 July 1995.

== In popular culture ==
Leggatt was first portrayed by Jak Malone in the stage musical Operation Mincemeat, which premiered in 2019 and is currently running both in the West End and on Broadway as of January 2026. Malone's portrayal of Leggatt won a 2024 Olivier Award and a 2025 Tony Award. Some lyrics in the musical's song "Dear Bill" were intentionally lifted directly from the Operation Mincemeat letters. Penelope Wilton played the role of Leggatt in the 2021 film Operation Mincemeat.

== Historical research ==
Leggatt's possible contributions to Operation Mincemeat were first brought to mainstream attention by Ben Macintyre's 2010 book Operation Mincemeat, though the book misspelled her name as "Leggett".

A group of fans of the stage musical were inspired to research into the real life of Leggatt, portrayed as a character in the play, as little was known about her. They contacted MI5 and were able to find out some key information about her, including the correct spelling of her surname (Leggatt not Leggett), and that she worked for Osbert Sitwell in the 1930s, for MI5 during the Second World War, and later for the British Council. In December 2023, a plaque was installed at the Fortune Theatre in commemoration of Leggatt.

A book about Leggatt was published in June 2025. It was written by theatre archivist Erin Edwards and is titled Finding Hester: The Incredible Story of the Hidden Woman Whose Love Letters Changed World War II in Operation Mincemeat.
