= Ivor Montagu =

British film maker (1904–1984)

The Honourable Ivor Montagu
- Ivor Montagu in middle age
- Born: Ivor Goldsmid Samuel Montagu; 23 April 1904; Kensington, London, England
- Died: 5 November 1984 (aged 80); Watford, Hertfordshire, England
- Known for: Filmmaker, critic, table tennis player, spy
- Relatives: Ewen Montagu (brother)
- Awards: Lenin Peace Prize; International Table Tennis Foundation Hall of Fame

Ivor Goldsmid Samuel Montagu (23 April 1904 – 5 November 1984) was an English filmmaker, screenwriter, producer, film critic, writer, table tennis player, and Communist activist and spy in the 1930s. He helped to develop a lively intellectual film culture in Britain during the interwar years, and was also the founder of the International Table Tennis Federation.

== Life and career ==
Montagu was born into wealth, as the third son of Gladys (née Goldsmid) and Louis Montagu, 2nd Baron Swaythling, members of a Jewish banking dynasty with a mansion in Kensington. He attended Westminster School and King's College, Cambridge, where he contributed to Granta. He became involved in zoological research.

With Sidney Bernstein he established the London Film Society in 1925, the first British film association devoted to showing art films and independent films. Montagu became the first film critic of The Observer and the New Statesman. He did the post-production work on Alfred Hitchcock's The Lodger in 1926 and was hired by Gaumont-British in the 1930s to work as producer on several of Hitchcock's thrillers. His 1928 silent slapstick movie Bluebottles (slang for police) is included in the British Film Institute's History of the Avant-Garde – Britain in the Twenties. The story was by H. G. Wells, and the stars of the film were Charles Laughton and Elsa Lanchester, while the remaining cast were his friends including Norman Haire (also Montagu's doctor), Sergei Nolbandov and Joe Beckett.

Montagu joined the Fabian Society in his youth, then the British Socialist Party, and then the Communist Party of Great Britain. This brought him into contact with the Russian film makers who were transforming the language of editing and montage in the 1920s. In 1930, he accompanied his friend Sergei Eisenstein to New York and Hollywood; later in the decade Montagu made compilation films, including Defence of Madrid (1936) and Peace and Plenty (1939) about the Spanish Civil War. He directed the documentary Wings Over Everest (1934) with Geoffrey Barkas. As a political figure and for a time a communist, much of his work at the time was on low budget, independent political films. By World War II, however, he made a film for the Ministry of Information.

In 1933, Montagu was a founder member of the Association of Cinematograph and Television Technicians, holding positions in the union until the 1960s. He also held post on the World Council of Peace. In 1934, he was founder of the Progressive Film Institute. After the war, Montagu worked as a film critic and reviewer.

Montagu had a keen interest in wildlife conservation, and was a council member of the Fauna Preservation Society for several years. He was friends with the eminent Soviet conservationist and zoologist Prof. Andrei Bannikov. He had contacts in Mongolia, and was a champion for the conservation of the endangered Przewalski's horse.

On 10 January 1927, he married Eileen Hellstern (1904–1984), the daughter of Francis Anton Hellstern, a boot maker from Camberwell. Although the couple did not have any children together, Ivor adopted Eileen's young daughter, Rowna Barnett, née Hellstern (1922–1996).

== Table tennis ==
Montagu was a champion table tennis player, representing Britain in matches all over the world. He also helped to establish and finance the first world championships in London in 1926.

Montagu founded the International Table Tennis Federation that same year, and was president of the group for more than forty years, not retiring until 1967. He helped expel apartheid South Africa from the Federation during the 1950s.

He also founded the English Table Tennis Association (ETTA), and served several terms as chairman and president.

Montagu was inducted into the International Table Tennis Foundation Hall of Fame in 1995.

== Recruited by Soviet intelligence ==
His older brother Ewen Montagu, a barrister in civilian life, became a naval intelligence officer during World War II, privy to the secrets of top-secret Ultra and the mastermind of the successful deception that launched the invasion of Sicily, Operation Mincemeat. He later wrote a best-selling account of that adventure, The Man Who Never Was.

A 25 July 1940 cable from Simon Davidovitch Kremer, Secretary to the Soviet Military Attaché in London, identified him as the somewhat reluctant new recruit who was supposed to create an "X Group" of like-minded friends. By the following year, Hitler had invaded Russia and the Soviet Union became an ally of Britain.

Ivor knew of his elder brother's intelligence work, but it seems doubtful his brother knew of his. Counter-espionage agents at MI5, however, even Ewen's boss John Masterman, seem to have suspected Ivor in general because of his outspoken Communist politics, his hanging around with "scruffy" Russians and housing a Jewish refugee in his house in the country. By far the greatest suspicions were aroused by Ivor's passionate support of international ping-pong, which seemed so eccentric to MI5 that they assumed it had to be a cover for something else. They even tapped his phone and opened his mail, creating three volumes on him by early 1942, but found nothing specific, much to Ewen's relief, since he was always worried that his own career in Naval Intelligence would be adversely affected by the activities of his younger brother.

Only after the decryption in the 1960s of Venona telegraphs from March 1940 through April 1942 was he purportedly identified as "Ivor Montagu, the well known local communist, journalist and lecturer," code name "Intelligentsia", in communications from the Soviet GRU. The Venona decrypts, which were declassified in 1995, are a highly contested and confusing archive of information, with a welter of code-names, which were frequently changed and not explicitly identified with their real names; hence these decrypts were never used in any American or British trials for treason, despite their availability to prosecutors from the late 1940s.

If "Intelligentsia" was, indeed, Ivor Montagu, his work for Soviet intelligence had little of the impact of the Cambridge Five, which included Kim Philby, recruited as idealistic anti-Fascists in the 1930s, who continued to work at the height of the Cold War. In 1952, MI5 intercepted a telegram from Ivor Montagu telling Charlie Chaplin how sorry he was to miss him in London when the star visited England that year; the British agency had agreed to spy on Chaplin for the FBI, who were looking for ways to keep him out of America at the height of McCarthyism. Apart from that, they left Montagu and his ping-pong tournaments alone.

Montagu was awarded the prestigious Lenin Peace Prize in 1959, given by the Soviet government to recipients whose work furthers the cause of socialism, primarily outside of the USSR.

== Writing ==
Montagu wrote many pamphlets and books, such as Film World (1964), With Eisenstein in Hollywood (1968), and The Youngest Son (1970). He wrote two books about table tennis: Table Tennis Today (1924) and Table Tennis (1936).

== See also ==
- List of select Jewish table tennis players
