= Pocket litter =

Materials left in a person's pockets

Pocket litter is material, including notes scribbled on scraps of paper, that accumulates in an individual's pockets. It can include identity cards, transportation tickets, personal photographs, computer files and similar material.

Counter-terrorism analysts report that the analysis of pocket litter can be an important tool for confirming or refuting suspects' accounts of themselves.

The term was used as early as 1973, by Watergate conspirator E. Howard Hunt.

The Combating Terrorism Center celebrated the first anniversary of the killing of Osama bin Laden by releasing documents seized from Osama bin Laden's Abbottabad home. The Associated Press reported that SEAL Team 6 had been specially trained to search for documents and pocket litter "that might produce leads to other terrorists."

In Operation Mincemeat of World War II, false pocket litter (a photograph of a supposed girlfriend, forged receipts, and so forth) was planted on a corpse to deceive the Germans into believing that it was actually that of one "Major William Martin" of the Royal Marines (a person who did not actually exist), and thus that the false secret documents carried by "Martin" were genuine.

== See also ==
- Garbology#Investigative_uses, the overall gathering of intelligence from waste material.
