= HMS Dasher (D37) =

1942 Avenger-class escort carrier of the Royal Navy

Coordinates: 55°36′38″N 5°00′06″W

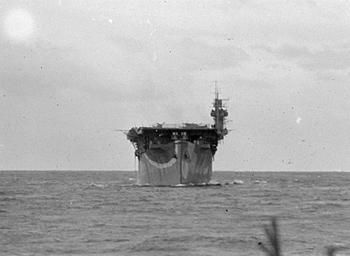
- HMS Dasher (note that this image appears to be reversed: the bridge was on the starboard side.)

History

United Kingdom
- Name: HMS Dasher
- Builder: Sun Shipbuilding
- Yard number: 189, USMC hull #62
- Laid down: 14 March 1940
- Launched: 11 April 1941
- Acquired: Delivered USMC 22 November 1941
- Commissioned: 2 July 1942
- Renamed: Built as Rio de Janeiro, renamed Dasher 2 July 1942
- Fate: Sunk by internal explosion 27 March 1943

General characteristics
- Class & type: Avenger-class escort carrier
- Displacement: 8,200 tons
- Length: 492 ft 3 in (150.04 m)
- Beam: 66 ft 3 in (20.19 m)
- Draught: 23 ft 3 in (7.09 m)
- Installed power: 8,500 bhp (6,300 kW)
- Propulsion: 4 × William Doxford & Sons diesels; 1 × shaft
- Speed: 16.5 knots (30.6 km/h; 19.0 mph)
- Complement: 555
- Armament: 3 × 4 inch DP, AA guns in single mounts; 15 × 20 mm anti-aircraft cannons in single or twin mounts
- Aircraft carried: 15
- Aviation facilities: Hangar 190 ft (58 m) x 47 ft (14 m); one 42 feet (13 m) x 34 feet (10 m) lifts; 9 arrestor wires

HMS Dasher (D37) was a British Royal Navy aircraft carrier, of the Avenger class of converted merchant vessels, and one of the shortest-lived escort carriers. She served in the Second World War and sank on 27 March 1943.

== Design and description ==
The Avenger-class escort carriers were converted U.S. Maritime Commission (USMC) type C3 American merchant ships. Their design was based on the United States Navy's Long Island class (AVG1). To differentiate between the two classes, the Royal Navy ships were prefixed with a 'B' (BAVG).

HMS Dasher (BAVG4) was built by the Sun Shipbuilding and Drydock Company, Chester, Pennsylvania. The ship was originally named Rio de Janeiro, intended for passenger/cargo service with Moore-McCormack Lines, laid down as yard hull 189, USMC hull 62 on 14 March 1940, launched on 11 April 1941. She was converted to an escort aircraft carrier in the Tietjen & Lang shipyards New Jersey and commissioned into the Royal Navy on 2 July 1942.

Dasher had a complement of 555 men and an overall length of 492 ft 3 in (150.04 m), a beam of 66 ft 3 in (20.19 m) and a draught of 23 ft 3 in (7.09 m). She displaced 8,200 long tons (8,300 t) at normal load and 9,000 long tons (9,100 t) at deep load. Propulsion was provided by four diesel engines connected to one shaft giving 8,500 bhp (6,300 kW), which could propel the ship at 16.5 knots (30.6 km/h; 19.0 mph).

Aircraft facilities were a small combined bridge–flight control on the starboard side and above the 410 ft (120 m) long wooden flight deck, one aircraft lift 43 by 34 ft (13 by 10 m), one aircraft catapult and nine arrestor wires. Aircraft could be housed in the 190 by 47 ft (58 by 14 m) half hangar below the flight deck. Armament comprised three single-mounted 4-inch dual-purpose guns, two forward and one aft, and fifteen 20 mm cannon on single or twin mounts. She had the capacity for 15 aircraft which could be a mixture of Grumman Martlet or Hawker Sea Hurricane fighters and Fairey Swordfish biplane torpedo bombers.

== Service history ==
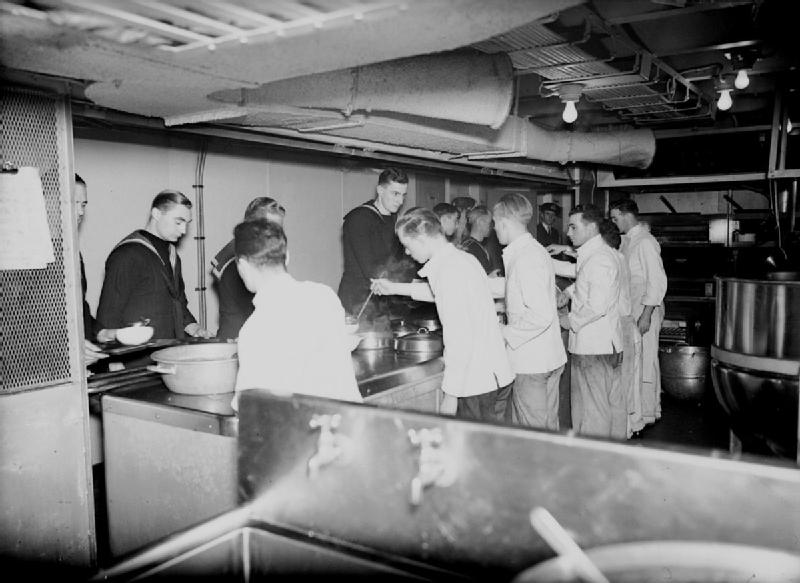
Inside the galley, sailors being served at the cafeteria counter

The ship was transferred to the Royal Navy and commissioned into RN service as HMS Dasher (D37) on 2 July 1942. She participated in Operation Torch, with her sister ship Biter, carrying Sea Hurricanes of 804 Naval Air Squadron. After aircraft ferry duties in the Mediterranean, Dasher sailed to the Clyde in March 1943 and, having had her flight-deck lengthened by 42 ft (13 m), she embarked Fairey Swordfish aircraft. She escorted one convoy successfully, but shortly after leaving with the second, Dasher suffered engine trouble and turned back. Shortly after getting to the Firth of Clyde on 27 March 1943, she suffered a major internal explosion and sank.

=== Loss ===
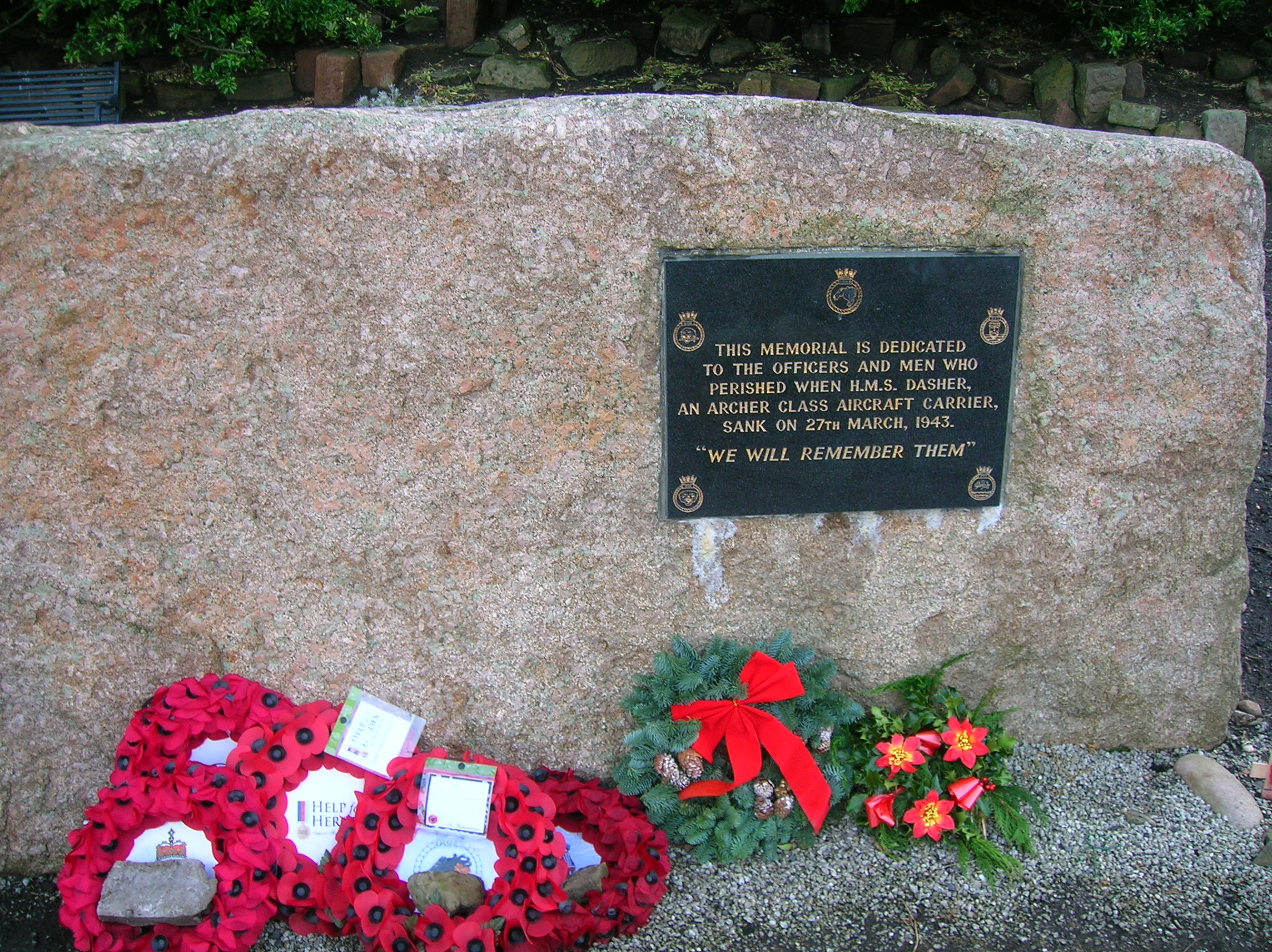
The memorial at Ardrossan seafront

Various possible causes have been suggested, including one of her aircraft crashing onto the flight deck and igniting petrol fumes from leaking tanks. Much of what happened remains unknown. The death toll, 379 out of 528 crewmen, despite rapid response and assistance from ships and rescue craft from Brodick and Lamlash on the Isle of Arran and from Ardrossan and Greenock on the Scottish mainland, was amongst the highest in British home waters. Many escaped from the ship but died of hypothermia or of burns suffered when escaped fuel ignited on the water. Most of the dead were buried at Ardrossan or Greenock.

The British blamed the bad design of fuel stowage and handling, while the US blamed the disaster on poor Royal Navy petrol-handling procedures. There were merits in both arguments, but thereafter the stowage on her British-operated sister ships was reduced from 75,000–88,000 US gal (280,000–330,000 L) down to 36,000 US gal (140,000 L), and the USN reduced theirs also but not as drastically. The government of the time, eager to avoid damage to morale and anxious to avoid any suggestion of faulty US construction, tried to cover up the sinking. The local media were ordered to make no reference to the tragedy.

There were rumours that the authorities ordered the dead to be buried in an unmarked mass grave, but none had been found as of 2021, and the Royal Navy said that a mass unmarked grave would have been against Admiralty policy and that all sources relating to the sinking of HMS Dasher are in the public domain. A witness said in 2021 that survivors had told her that there was a mortuary where they were taken to identify about fifty bodies laid out, "just dumped". People living nearby saw the bodies over a high wall, "then they all disappeared". Furious relatives protested and some of the dead were returned to their families for burial. The survivors were ordered not to talk about what happened. This policy subsequently attracted much criticism. There are now memorials to those lost at both Ardrossan and Brodick. The wreck site lies approximately halfway on the Caledonian MacBrayne ferry route between Ardrossan and Brodick and is a controlled site under the Protection of Military Remains Act.

Teak boards from the flight deck of Dasher washed up on the beach at Ardrossan in 1999. They were riddled with tubes made by burrowing teredo worms. A section of this wood featured in the "Flotsam and Jetsam" exhibition in the Millennium Dome and another piece is held by the North Ayrshire Heritage Centre in Saltcoats.

There was speculation that one corpse from the sinking was used during the British deception Operation Mincemeat ("The Man Who Never Was"). The case was argued by authors John and Noreen Steele in their 2002 book The Secrets of HMS Dasher. However, it was later determined that the body used was that of Glyndwr Michael, a vagrant who died after ingesting rat poison. His identity was uncovered in 1996 by Roger Morgan, who discovered supporting evidence in the Public Record Office.

== Sources ==
- Andrew, Christopher (2010). The Defence of the Realm. London: Penguin Books. ISBN 978-0-14-102330-4.
- Cocker, Maurice (2008). Aircraft-Carrying Ships of the Royal Navy. Stroud, Gloucestershire: The History Press. ISBN 978-0-7524-4633-2.
- Macintyre, Ben (2010). Operation Mincemeat. London: Bloomsbury. ISBN 978-1-4088-0921-1.
- Morgan, Roger (November 1996). "The Second World War's Best Kept Secret Revealed". After the Battle (94).
- Poolman, Kenneth (1972). Escort Carrier 1941–1945. London: Ian Allan. ISBN 0-7110-0273-8.
- Smyth, Denis (2010). Deathly Deception: The Real Story of Operation Mincemeat. London: Oxford University Press. ISBN 978-0-19-923398-4.
