= Trout memo =

1939 document possibly by Ian Fleming

The Trout memo, written in 1939, is a document comparing the deception of an enemy in wartime with fly fishing. Issued under the name of Admiral John Godfrey, Britain's director of naval intelligence, according to the historian Ben Macintyre it bore the hallmarks of having been written by Godfrey's assistant Ian Fleming, who later created the James Bond series of spy novels.

== The memo ==
The memo read, in part: "The Trout Fisher casts patiently all day. He frequently changes his venue and his lures. If he has frightened a fish he may 'give the water a rest for half-an-hour,' but his main endeavour, to attract fish by something he sends out from his boat, is incessant." The memo lists 54 ways that the enemy, like trout, may be fooled or lured.

The 28th suggestion, inspired by a novel written by Basil Thomson, was titled "A Suggestion (not a very nice one)." This idea was the inspiration for Operation Mincemeat, a World War II plan developed by British military officers Charles Cholmondeley and Ewen Montagu, to plant misleading documents on a dead body to convince the Germans that the Allies would attack Greece and Sardinia rather than Sicily in 1943. When the operation succeeded, confirmation was sent to Churchill: "Mincemeat swallowed rod, line and sinker."
