= Jak Malone =

English stage actor (born 1994)

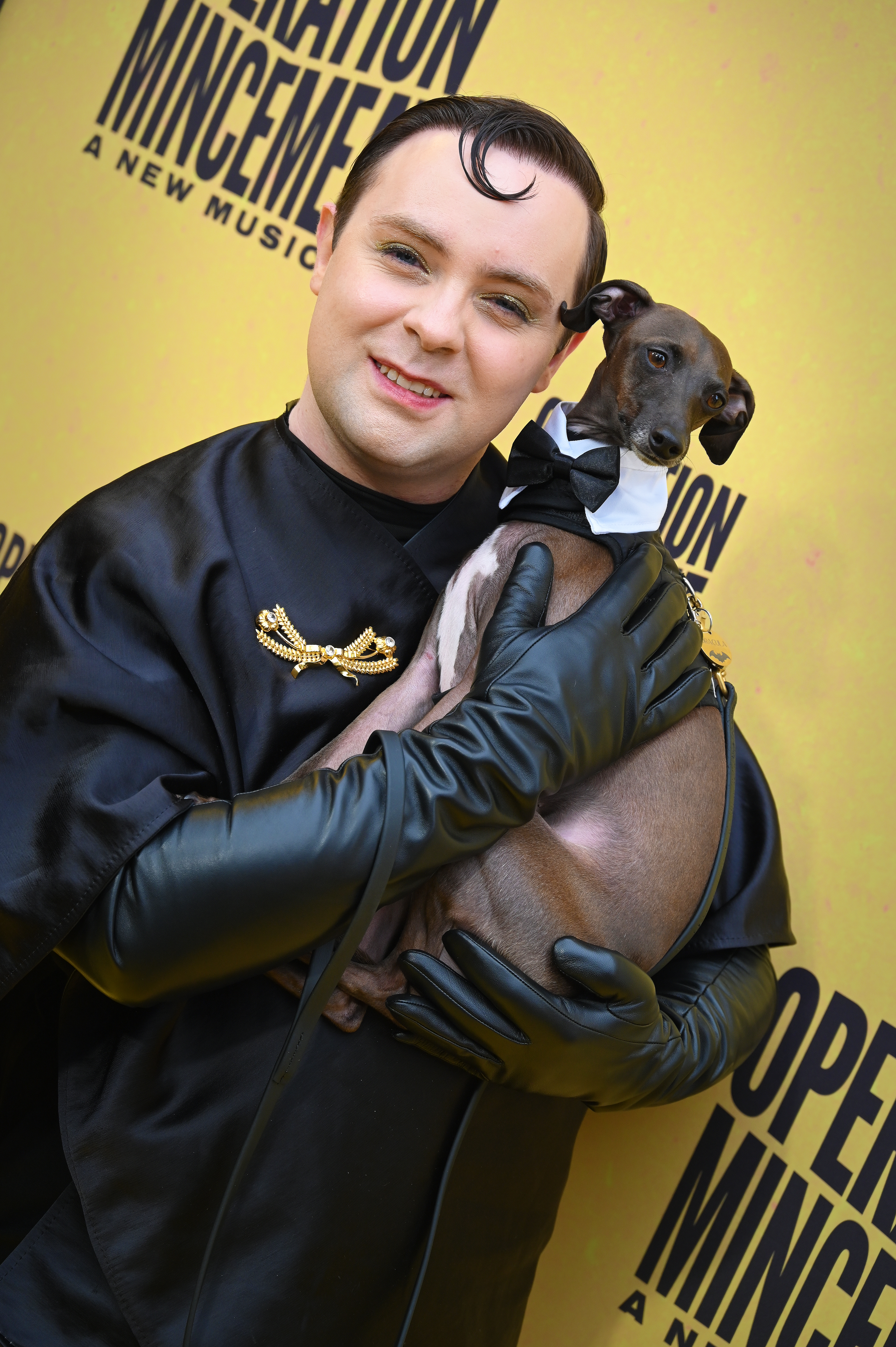
- Jak Malone at Operation Mincemeat’s opening night on Broadway with Italian greyhound Dracula, 2025
- Born: December 1993 (age 32)
- Education: The Liverpool Institution For Performing Arts
- Years active: 2018–present

Jak Malone (born December 1993) is an English actor known for his roles on West End and Broadway stages. He is best known for originating the role of Hester Leggatt & others in the musical Operation Mincemeat, which earned him a Tony Award and a Laurence Olivier Award for his performance.

== Early life ==
Malone grew up in Merseyside, England. His mother was a nurse and his father worked in a soap factory. He first discovered a love of theatre because his grandmother worked as a dresser. He trained in acting at The Liverpool Institute For Performing Arts and graduated in 2018.

== Acting career ==
Upon graduating, Malone played the role of “Dim” in a production of A Clockwork Orange at The Liverpool Everyman Theatre. The following year he joined the cast of Operation Mincemeat for its first run at The New Diorama Theatre. In 2020, Malone was due to appear in the UK premier production of Diva: Live From Hell but the run was cancelled the night before performances were scheduled to begin due to the COVID 19 Pandemic. Malone continued his involvement with Operation Mincemeat through multiple runs at the Southwark Playhouse and Riverside Studios until he made his West End debut with the show at the Fortune Theatre in 2023. Malone has received great critical reception for his performance in Operation Mincemeat and won a Laurence Olivier Award for Best Actor in a Supporting Role in a Musical for his portrayal of Hester Leggatt and others. In 2025, Malone opened with Operation Mincemeat on Broadway at the Golden Theatre, once again to critical acclaim, which his performance earned him multiple awards including a Tony Award.

== Personal life ==
Malone is in a long term relationship with his partner, Jasmine. He is queer and has been outspoken about LGBTQ+ rights.

"If you watched our show and found yourself believing in Hester, well then I am so glad to tell you, intentionally or otherwise, you might have just bid farewell to cynicism, to outdated ideas, to that rotten old binary, and opened yourself up to a world that is out there in glorious technicolor and isn’t going away anytime soon."

— Jak Malone, 2025 Tony Award acceptance speech

Malone has an Italian Greyhound named Dracula, who became the first dog officially thanked in a Tony acceptance speech.

== Acting credits ==
Year	Title	Role	Venue	Ref
2018	A Clockwork Orange	Dim	Everyman, Liverpool	
2019	Operation Mincemeat	Hester Leggatt and Others	New Diorama Theatre	
2019	Max and Ivan: Fugitives	Dimitri	Storyglass	
2020, 2021, 2022	Operation Mincemeat	Hester Leggatt and Others	Southwark Playhouse	
2022	Operation Mincemeat	Hester Leggatt and Others	Riverside Studios	
2023-24	Operation Mincemeat	Hester Leggatt and Others	Fortune Theatre	
2024	Sondheim on Sondheim	Self	Alexandra Palace	
2025-2026	Operation Mincemeat	Hester Leggatt and Others	John Golden Theatre	

== Awards and nominations ==
Year	Work	Award	Category	Result
2022	Operation Mincemeat	West End Wilma Awards	Best Performer in an Off-West End Show	Nominated
2023	Operation Mincemeat	West End Wilma Awards	Best Performer in a West End Show	Nominated
2023	Operation Mincemeat	West End Wilma Awards	Rising Star	Won
2024	Operation Mincemeat	WhatsOnStage Awards	Best Supporting Performer in a Musical	Nominated
2024	Operation Mincemeat	Laurence Olivier Awards	Best Actor in a Supporting Role in a Musical	Won
2025	Operation Mincemeat	Drama League Awards	Distinguished Performance	Nominated
2025	Operation Mincemeat	Outer Critics Circle Awards	Outstanding Featured Performer in a Broadway Musical	Won
2025	Operation Mincemeat	Drama Desk Awards	Outstanding Featured Performance in a Musical	Won
2025	Operation Mincemeat	Dorian Awards	Outstanding Featured Performance in a Broadway Musical	Won
2025	Operation Mincemeat	Tony Awards	Best Performance by a Featured Actor in a Musical	Won

== See also ==
- List of British actors
