= Karl-Erich Kühlenthal =

German spy (1908–1975)

Major Karl-Erich Kühlenthal (1908 – October 25, 1975) was a German spy and one of the most senior Abwehr agents in Spain during World War II.

Although the head of German intelligence in Spain was then Wilhelm Leissner, alias "Gustav Lenz"codename "Heidelberg", Admiral Wilhelm Canaris had taken a shine to Kühlenthal to the extent that Leissner was effectively superseded. Kühlenthal's reports were very well received in Berlin, albeit that (from a British point of view) Kühlenthal was so easily duped that he "was the ideal spy to pass (dis)information, because he was worse than useless."

Kühlenthal was a Mischling—"a half-blood Jew" with a Jewish grandmother—but Canaris had managed to secure an Aryan certificate for him in 1941. (Note: "In his MI5 file, the British noted an anomaly: Kühlenthal was 'a half blood Jew.' Canaris had him legally declared an Aryan in 1941, but the conversion didn't sit well with Kühlenthal's peers.")

In 1943, when the body of "Major William Martin"—a Royal Marine attached to Combined Operations—had washed up on a beach in Spain after a possible plane crash, Kühlenthal thought he had found important classified documents on the British major's body. In fact, the documents were false and the body was part of a fake persona to lend credibility. These were part of Operation Mincemeat, a plan to convince the Germans that the Allies planned to invade Greece and Sardinia instead of Sicily. It is not certain if Kühlenthal was convinced by the documents, but he passed them on to his superiors, who "swallowed Mincemeat whole".

== Bibliographies ==
- Macintyre, B. (2010). Operation Mincemeat. The True Spy Story that Changed the Course of World War II. London: Bloomsbury. ISBN 9780747598688.
- Talty, S. (2012). Agent Garbo: The Brilliant, Eccentric Secret Agent Who Tricked Hitler and Saved D-Day. Boston: Houghton Mifflin. ISBN 9780547614816.
