= Paddy Ridsdale =

British spy (1921–2009)

Dame Victoire Evelyn Patricia Ridsdale, Lady Ridsdale, DBE (née Bennett; 11 October 1921 – 16 December 2009), known as Dame Paddy Ridsdale, was a British secretary and intelligence operative. She was author Ian Fleming's secretary during World War II and was the model for the character Miss Moneypenny, being M.'s loyal, long-suffering secretary, who is smitten with James Bond.

== Career ==
Paddy Ridsdale served as an intelligence operative during World War II. It was later disclosed that she may have assisted Fleming's counter-intelligence efforts during World War II by helping create a fictitious identity for a body in Operation Mincemeat. The body was "disguise[d] as that of a naval officer, complete with totally convincing "secret" papers showing a different plan of attack ... [t]he body, appearing to be a casualty from a shot-down plane, would then be floated ashore in Spain, where local German spies would find it ... Fleming's task was to make the body totally convincing. The book covers the minute attention paid to detail, which included placing theatre tickets and love letters in "Major Martin's" pockets." Ridsdale is one of two probable authors of those love letters, the other being Hester Leggatt. According to Ben Macintyre they were written by Leggatt; Denis Smyth identifies the author as Ridsdale, who claimed she had written them.

== Personal life and death ==
She was the wife of Sir Julian Ridsdale. She was chairwoman of the Conservative MPs' Wives club for which she was appointed a DBE in 1991, ten years after her husband's knighthood. She survived her husband, who died in 2004; they had been married since 1942 and had one daughter, Penny.

Ridsdale died in 2009, aged 88.
