= Ewen Montagu =

British intelligence analyst (1901–1985)

Captain The Honourable Ewen Montagu CBE QC DL
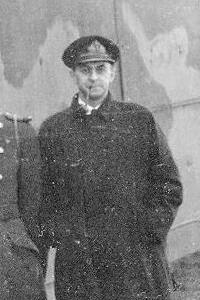

Personal details
- Born: Ewen Edward Samuel Montagu; 29 March 1901
- Died: 19 July 1985 (aged 84)
- Occupation: Naval intelligence officer
- Known for: Operation Mincemeat

Ewen Edward Samuel Montagu CBE QC DL (29 March 1901 – 19 July 1985) was a British judge, Naval intelligence officer, and author.

He is best known for his leading role in Operation Mincemeat, a critical military deception operation that misdirected German forces' attention away from the Allied invasion of Sicily ("Operation Husky").

Montagu was president of the United Synagogue from 1954 to 1962, and President of the Anglo-Jewish Association from December 1949.

== Life and career ==
Montagu was born in 1901, the second son of Gladys, Baroness Swaythling (née Goldsmid) and Louis Montagu, 2nd Baron Swaythling. His family was Jewish. He was educated at Westminster School before becoming a machine gun instructor during the First World War at a United States Naval Air Station. After the war he studied at Trinity College, Cambridge and at Harvard University. He was admitted to the Middle Temple on 22 November 1920 and was called to the bar on 14 May 1924. One of his more celebrated cases as a junior barrister was the defence of Alma Rattenbury in 1935 against a charge of murdering her 30-years-older husband, the architect Francis Rattenbury, who was savagely beaten with a mallet at the Villa Madeira in Bournemouth. He took silk in 1939.

== Naval intelligence ==
Montagu was a keen yachtsman, and enlisted in the Royal Navy Volunteer Reserve in 1938. Because of his legal background he was reassigned to specialized study. From there he was assigned to the Royal Navy's East Yorkshire headquarters at Hull as an assistant staff officer in intelligence. Montagu served in the Naval Intelligence Division of the British Admiralty, rising to the rank of Lieutenant Commander RNVR. He was the Naval Representative on the XX Committee, which oversaw the running of double agents.

=== Operation Mincemeat ===
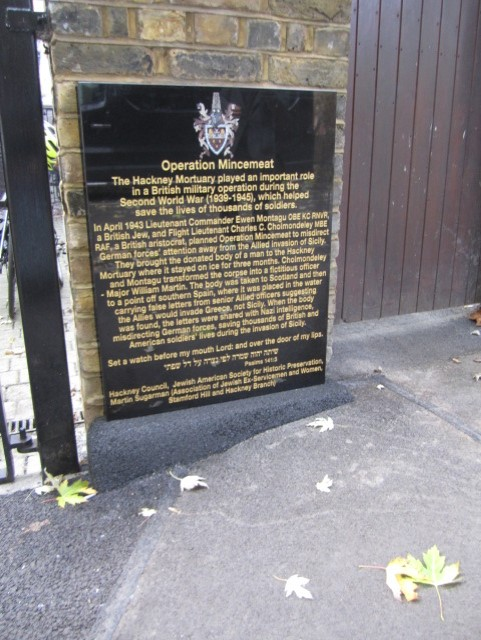
Mincemeat plaque at Hackney Mortuary

While Commanding Officer of NID 17M, Montagu and Squadron Leader Charles Cholmondeley RAFVR conceived Operation Mincemeat, a major deception operation. Montagu had the idea of having a corpse dressed as a British officer wash ashore in Spain, carrying faked papers revealing plans for invasion of Greece (the real target was Sicily). The location chosen was where pro-German Spanish officials would show the papers to German agents. Montagu manufactured a false identity, "William Martin", for the body of Glyndwr Michael to have in his pockets: military ID, theatre ticket stubs, love letters and a photo of his fiancée, bills from a tailor and jeweller. To follow the normal wartime procedure that dead or missing officers were required to be listed in the obituary column of The Times, Acting Major William Martin was so listed in the edition of 4 June 1943.

The Germans were fooled completely. German documents found after the war showed that the false information went all the way to Hitler's headquarters, and led to German forces being diverted to Greece. The invasion of Sicily was a success. Historian Hugh Trevor-Roper called it the best deception in the history of military deception. For his role in Operation Mincemeat, Montagu was appointed to the Military Division of the Order of the British Empire. In November 2021 the Jewish American Society for Historic Preservation, working with the Association of Jewish Ex-Servicemen and Women and the London Borough of Hackney, placed a memorial at the Hackney Mortuary, where the corpse had been prepared.

== Later career ==
From 1945 to 1973 Montagu held the position of Judge Advocate of the Fleet. He wrote The Man Who Never Was (1953), an account of Operation Mincemeat, which was adapted as a theatrical film three years later. Montagu also wrote Beyond Top Secret Ultra, which focused more on the information technology and espionage tactics used in World War II. He was a governor of a public health project, the Peckham Experiment, in 1949.

Before the Courts Act 1971 Montagu was Chairman of the Quarter Sessions for the Middlesex area of Greater London and recorder in the County of Hampshire. He was appointed Deputy Lieutenant of the County of Southampton.

Montagu was president of the United Synagogue from 1954 to 1962, and President of the Anglo-Jewish Association from December 1949.

== Family ==
Montagu's youngest brother, Ivor Montagu, was a film maker and Communist. Ewen Montagu married Iris, the daughter of the painter Solomon J. Solomon, on 14 June 1923. They had a son, Jeremy (b. 1927), who became an authority on musical instruments, and a daughter, Jennifer, who became an art historian.

Montagu was a first cousin once removed of comedian Christopher Guest, through Montagu's maternal grandparents.

== In popular culture ==
Montagu has been portrayed on screen twice relating to Operation Mincemeat. In the 1956 film The Man Who Never Was, he was portrayed by Clifton Webb. In the 2021 film Operation Mincemeat, he was played by Colin Firth. Montagu himself appeared in The Man Who Never Was, playing an air-vice marshal questioning the Ewen Montagu character in a briefing.

Montagu has also appeared as a character in at least one adaptation of the real life murder of Francis Rattenbury. The best known is the Terence Rattigan radio play (1975), stage play (1977) and TV movie (1987) Cause Célèbre. Montagu was played by Rory Fleck-Byrne in the original BBC Radio 4 radio play and the stage adaptation and by Adam Blackwood in the later TV movie. An earlier television play based on the case, Killer In Close-Up: The Rattenbury Case (1958), written by George F. Kerr and produced by Melbourne television station ABV-2, but as the recording is no longer known to exist, it is not clear if the defence barrister was identified as Montagu, nor who played him.

In the musical Operation Mincemeat, the role of Montagu was originated on the West End by co-creator Natasha Hodgson, who also reprised the role on Broadway.

== Bibliography ==
- Montagu, Ewen (1954). The Man Who Never Was. Philadelphia: Lippincott.
- Montagu, Ewen (1974). The Archer-Shee Case. Newton Abbot: David and Charles. ISBN 0-7153-6774-9.
- Montagu, Ewen (1977). Beyond Top Secret ULTRA. Coward McGann and Geoghegan. ISBN 0-698-10882-5.
