= Operation Mincemeat =

British Second World War deception operation

- Part of Operation Barclay
- Operational scope: Tactical deception
- Location: Spain
- Planned: 1943
- Planned by: Ewen Montagu; Charles Cholmondeley
- Objective: Deceive German officials into believing that the Allied invasion of southern Europe would be in Greece and not Sicily
- Date: April 1943
- Executed by: Military Intelligence, Section 5 (MI5); Royal Navy (from HMS Seraph)
- Outcome: Successful

Operation Mincemeat was a successful British deception operation of the Second World War to disguise the 1943 Allied invasion of Sicily. Two members of British intelligence obtained the body of Glyndwr Michael, a tramp who died from eating rat poison, dressed him as an officer of the Royal Marines and placed personal items on him identifying him as the fictitious Captain (Acting Major) William Martin. Correspondence between two British generals that suggested that the Allies planned to invade Greece and Sardinia, with Sicily as merely the target of a diversionary attack, was also placed on the body.

Part of the wider Operation Barclay, Mincemeat was based on the 1939 Trout memo, written by Rear Admiral John Godfrey, the director of the Naval Intelligence Division, and his personal assistant, Lieutenant Commander Ian Fleming. With the approval of the British prime minister, Winston Churchill, and the American military commander in the Mediterranean, General Dwight D. Eisenhower, the body was transported to the southern coast of Spain by submarine and releasing it close to shore, where it was picked up the following morning by a Spanish fisherman. The nominally neutral Spanish government shared copies of the documents with the Abwehr, the German military intelligence organisation, before returning the originals to the British. Forensic examination showed they had been read and Ultra decrypts of German messages showed that the Germans fell for the ruse. German reinforcements were shifted to Greece and Sardinia before and during the invasion of Sicily; Sicily received none.

The full effect of Operation Mincemeat is not known, but Sicily was liberated more quickly than anticipated and losses were lower than predicted. The events were depicted in Operation Heartbreak, a 1950 novel by the former cabinet minister Duff Cooper, before one of the intelligence officers who planned and carried out Mincemeat, Ewen Montagu, wrote a history in 1953. Montagu's book formed the basis for the 1956 British film The Man Who Never Was. A second British film was released in 2021, titled Operation Mincemeat. The story has also has been adapted into a musical.

== Background ==
=== Inspiration for Mincemeat ===
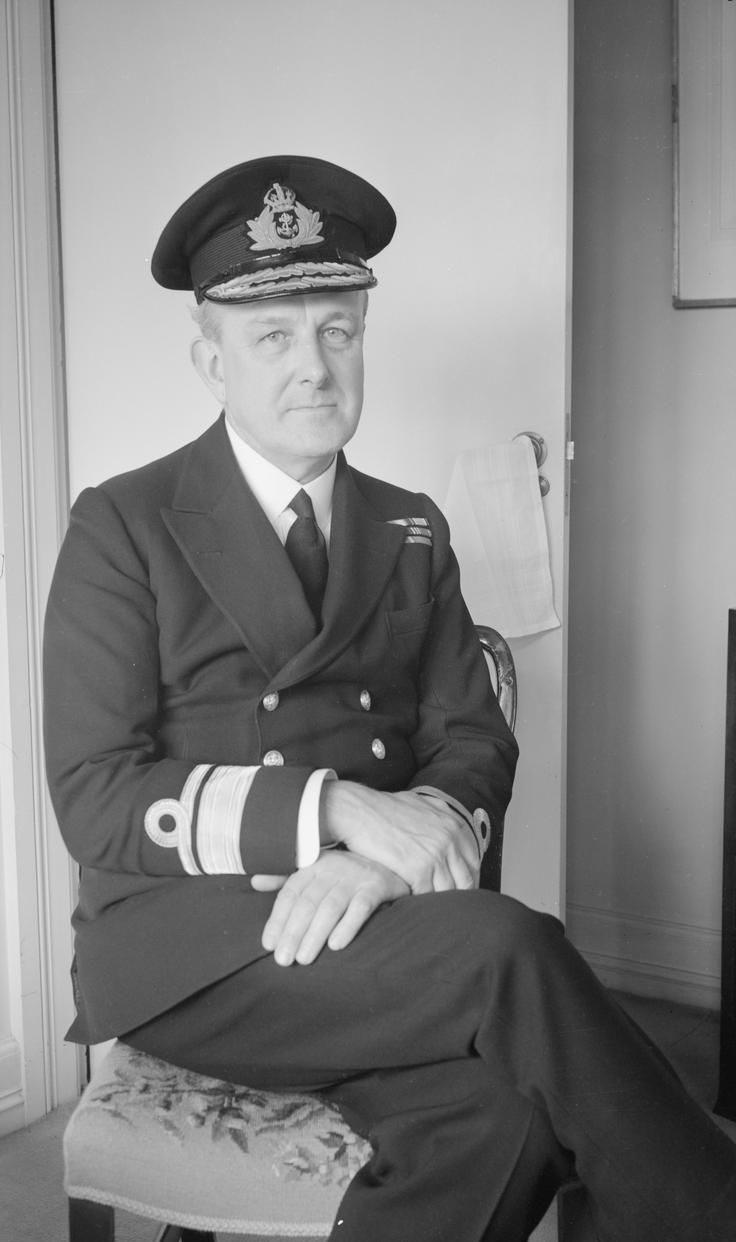
Rear Admiral John Godfrey, in whose name the Trout memo was circulated

On 29 September 1939, soon after the start of the Second World War, Rear Admiral John Godfrey, the Director of Naval Intelligence, circulated the Trout memo, a paper that compared the deception of an enemy in wartime to fly fishing. The journalist and author Ben Macintyre observes that, although the paper was published under Godfrey's name, it "bore all the hallmarks of ... Lieutenant Commander Ian Fleming", Godfrey's personal assistant. (Note: After the war Fleming went on to write the James Bond series of books; he based much of Bond's superior, M, on Godfrey, although Godfrey thought the character was "unsavoury".) The memo contained a number of schemes to be considered for use against the Axis powers to lure U-boats and German surface ships towards minefields. Number 28 on the list was titled: "A Suggestion (not a very nice one)"; it was an idea to plant misleading papers on a corpse that would be found by the enemy.

The following suggestion is used in a book by Basil Thomson: a corpse dressed as an airman, with despatches in his pockets, could be dropped on the coast, supposedly from a parachute that has failed. I understand there is no difficulty in obtaining corpses at the Naval Hospital, but, of course, it would have to be a fresh one.

The deliberate planting of fake documents to be found by the enemy was not new; known as the Haversack Ruse, it had been practised by the British and others in the First and Second World Wars. In August 1942, before the Battle of Alam el Halfa, a corpse was placed in a blown-up scout car, in a minefield facing the German 90th Light Division. On the corpse was a map purportedly showing the locations of British minefields; the Germans used the map, and their tanks were routed to areas of soft sand where they bogged down.

In September 1942 an aircraft flying from Britain to Gibraltar crashed off Cádiz. All aboard were killed, including Paymaster-Lieutenant James Hadden Turner – a courier carrying top secret documents – and a French agent. Turner's documents included a letter from General Mark Clark, the American deputy commander of the Allied Expeditionary Force, to General Noel Mason-MacFarlane, British governor and commander in chief of Gibraltar, informing him that General Dwight D. Eisenhower, the Supreme Commander, would arrive in Gibraltar on the eve of Operation Torch's "target date" of 4 November. Turner's body washed up on the beach near Tarifa and was recovered by the Spanish authorities. When the body was returned to the British, the letter was still on it, and technicians determined that the letter had not been opened. Other Allied intelligence sources established that the notebook carried by the French agent had been copied by the Germans, but they dismissed it as being disinformation. To British planners, it showed that some material that was obtained by the Spanish was being passed to the Germans.

=== British Intelligence and the inspiration for the plan ===
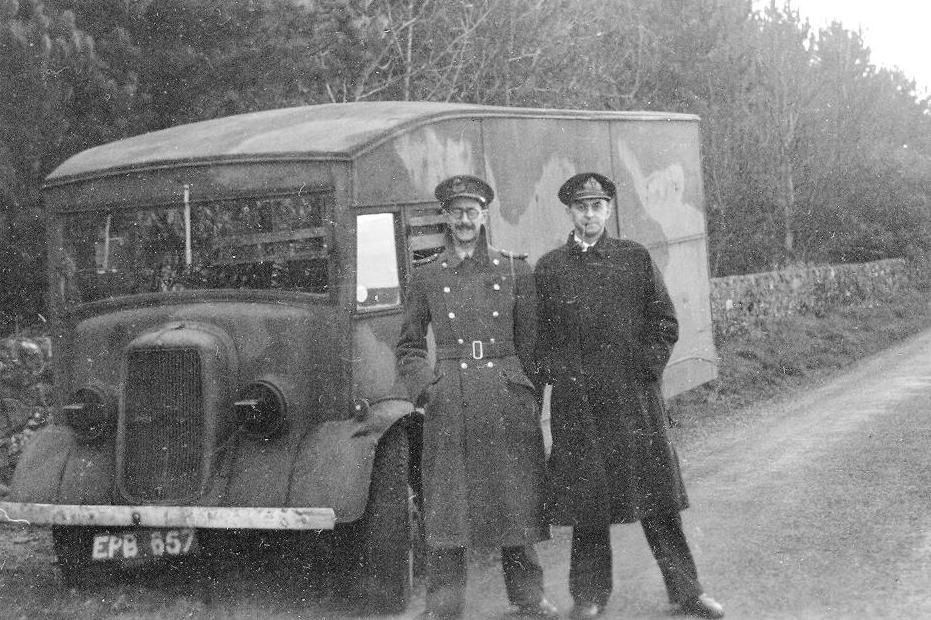
Charles Cholmondeley and Ewen Montagu on 17 April 1943, transporting the body to Scotland

A month after the Turner crash, the British intelligence officer Charles Cholmondeley (Note: Cholmondeley is pronounced Chumly.) outlined his own variation of the Trout memo plan, codenamed Trojan Horse, after the Achaean deception from the Trojan War. His plan was:

A body is obtained from one of the London hospitals ... The lungs are filled with water and documents are disposed in an inside pocket. The body is then dropped by a Coastal Command aircraft ... On being found, the supposition in the enemy's mind may well be that one of our aircraft has either been shot or forced down and that this is one of their passengers.

Cholmondeley was a flight lieutenant in the Royal Air Force (RAF) who had been seconded to MI5, Britain's domestic counter-intelligence and security service. He had been appointed as the secretary of the Twenty Committee, a small inter-service, inter-departmental intelligence team in charge of double agents. (Note: The Twenty Committee gained its name from the Roman numeral XX (twenty), a visual pun on the phrase "double cross".) In November 1942 the Twenty Committee turned down Cholmondeley's plan as being unworkable, but thought there may have been some potential in the idea. As there was a naval connection to the plan, John Masterman, the chairman of the committee, assigned Ewen Montagu, the naval representative, to work with Cholmondeley to develop the plan further. Montagu – a peacetime lawyer and King's Counsel who had volunteered at the outbreak of the war – worked under Godfrey at the Naval Intelligence Division, where he ran NID 17(M), the sub-branch which handled counter-espionage work. Godfrey had also appointed Montagu to oversee all naval deception involving double agents. As part of his duties, Montagu had been briefed on the need for deception operations to aid the Allied war aims in a forthcoming invasion operation in the Mediterranean.

=== Military situation ===
Sicily (in red) in relation to North Africa, Greece and the Italian mainland

In late 1942, with the Allied success in the North African campaign, military planners turned their attention to the next target. British planners considered that an invasion of France from Britain could not take place until 1944 and the prime minister, Winston Churchill, wanted to use the Allied forces from North Africa to attack Europe's "soft underbelly". There were two possible targets for the Allies to attack. The first option was Sicily; control of the island would open the Mediterranean Sea to Allied shipping and allow the invasion of continental Europe through Italy. The second option was to go into Greece and the Balkans, to trap the German forces between the British and American invaders and the Soviets. (Note: American planners favoured either a cross-channel invasion into northern France in 1943, or to increase pressure in the Pacific War; the American president Franklin D. Roosevelt was undecided on either of the two options, and was persuaded by Churchill to support the invasion of Sicily.)

At the Casablanca Conference in January 1943, Allied planners agreed on the selection of Sicily – codenamed Operation Husky – and decided to undertake the invasion no later than July. There was concern among the Allied planners that Sicily was an obvious choice – Churchill is reputed to have said "Everyone but a bloody fool would know that it's Sicily" – and that the build-up of resources for the invasion would be detected.

Adolf Hitler was concerned about a Balkan invasion, as the area had been the source of raw materials for the German war industry, including copper, bauxite, chrome and oil. The Allies knew of Hitler's fears, and they launched Operation Barclay, a deception operation to play upon his concerns and to mislead the Germans into thinking the Balkans were the objective, diverting resources from Sicily. The deception reinforced German strategic thinking about the likely British target. To suggest the eastern Mediterranean was the target, the Allies set up a headquarters in Cairo, Egypt, for a fictional formation, the Twelfth Army, consisting of twelve divisions. Military manoeuvres were conducted in Syria, with numbers inflated by dummy tanks and armoured vehicles to deceive observers. Greek interpreters were recruited and the Allies stockpiled Greek maps and currency. False communications about troop movements were generated from the Twelfth Army headquarters, while the Allied command post in Tunis – which was to be the headquarters of the Sicily invasion – reduced radio traffic by using landlines wherever possible.

== Development ==
=== Examining the practicalities; locating a corpse ===
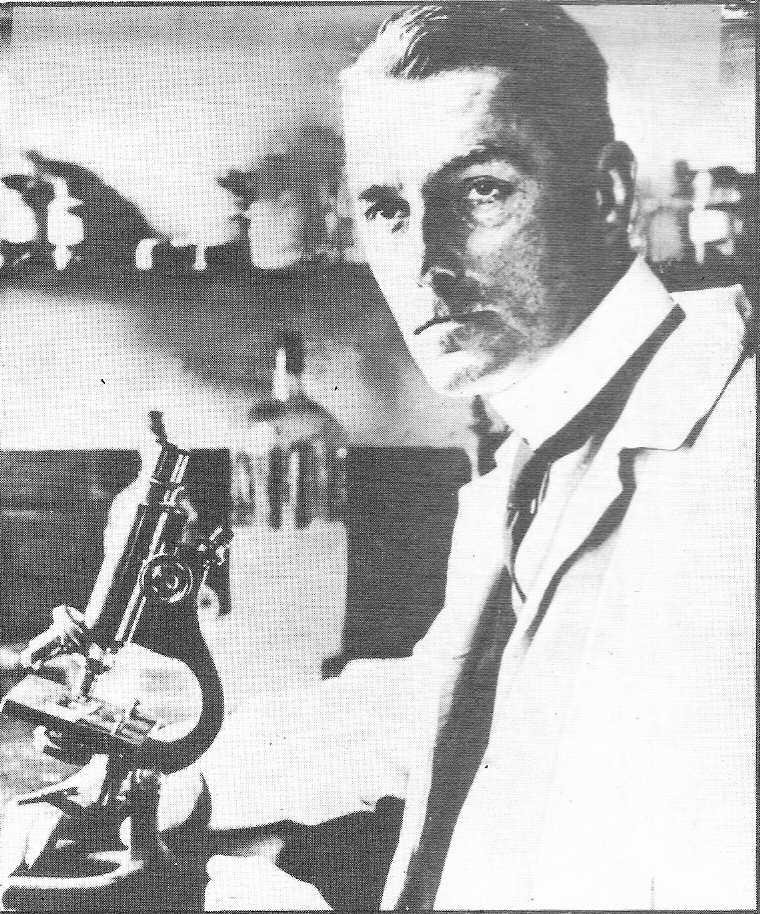
The pathologist Sir Bernard Spilsbury, who assisted with the operation

Montagu and Cholmondeley were assisted by an MI6 representative, Major Frank Foley, as they examined the practicalities of the plan. Montagu approached the pathologist Sir Bernard Spilsbury to determine what kind of body they needed and what factors they would need to take into account to fool a Spanish pathologist. Spilsbury informed him that those who died in an air crash in water often did so from shock and not drowning; the lungs would not necessarily be filled with water. He added that "Spaniards, as Roman Catholics, were averse to post-mortems and did not hold them unless the cause of death was of great importance". Spilsbury advised that a person could have suffered one of many different causes of death, which could be misconstrued in an autopsy. Montagu later wrote

If a post mortem examination was made by someone who had formed the preconceived idea that the death was probably due to drowning there was little likelihood that the difference between this liquid, in lungs that had started to decompose, and seawater would be noticed.

This meant that not only would they have a better degree of success than they previously thought, but that there would be a larger number of corpses potentially available for selection when the time came. When Montagu discussed the possibility of obtaining a corpse with Bentley Purchase, the coroner for the Northern District of London, he was told there would be practical and legal difficulties: "I should think bodies are the only commodities not in short supply at the moment [but] even with bodies all over the place, each one has to be accounted for". Purchase promised to look out for a body that was suitable, with no relatives who would claim the corpse for burial.

On 28 January 1943 Purchase contacted Montagu with the news he had located a suitable body, probably that of Glyndwr Michael, a tramp who died from eating rat poison that contained phosphorus. Purchase informed Montagu and Cholmondeley that the small amount of poison in the system would not be identified in a body that was supposed to have been floating in the sea for several days. When Montagu commented that the under-nourished corpse did not look like a fit field officer, Purchase informed him that "he does not have to look like an officer – only a staff officer", more used to office work. Purchase agreed to keep the body in the mortuary refrigerator at a temperature of 4 °C (39 °F) – any colder and the flesh would freeze, which would be obvious after the body defrosted. He warned Montagu and Cholmondeley that the body had to be used within three months, after which it would have decomposed past the point of usefulness.

==== Identity of the corpse ====
Montagu refused to identify the individual and described him as "a bit of a ne'er-do-well, and that the only worthwhile thing that he ever did he did after his death". In 1996 Roger Morgan, an amateur historian from London, uncovered evidence in the Public Record Office that the identity of the corpse was Michael. An alternative theory to the corpse's identity was suggested in the history book The Secrets of HMS Dasher (2004) that in March 1943 there was an explosion on HMS Dasher, which sank, killing 379 men; one of these corpses was purportedly used. The military historian Denis Smyth dismisses the suggestion and observes that the official records of the operation state that Glyndwr Michael was the body.

=== Developing the plan; the corpse's new identity ===
Montagu selected the code name Mincemeat from a list of centrally held available possibilities. (Note: It was the second time the name Mincemeat had been used; the first had been for a mine-laying operation in 1941.) On 4 February 1943 Montagu and Cholmondeley filed their plan for the operation with the Twenty Committee; it was a re-working of Cholmondeley's Trojan Horse plan. The Mincemeat plan was to place documents on the corpse, and then float it off the coast of Spain, whose nominally neutral government was known to co-operate with the Abwehr, the German military intelligence organisation. The plan was passed by the committee, who passed it up the chain of command to the senior Allied strategists; Montagu and Cholmondeley were ordered to continue with their preparations for the operation.

Montagu and Cholmondeley began to create a "legend" – a fictitious background and character – for the body. The name and rank chosen was Captain (Acting Major) William Martin, of the Royal Marines assigned to Combined Operations Headquarters. The name "Martin" was selected because there were several men with that name of about that rank in the Royal Marines. As a Royal Marine, Major Martin came under Admiralty authority, and it would be easy to ensure that all official inquiries and messages about his death would be routed to the Naval Intelligence Division. Additionally, Royal Marines would wear battledress, which was easily obtainable and came in standard sizes. (Note: This was as opposed to an officer of the Royal Navy, who would travel in full service dress that was made-to-measure.) The rank of acting major made him senior enough to be entrusted with sensitive documents, but not so prominent that anyone would expect to know him.

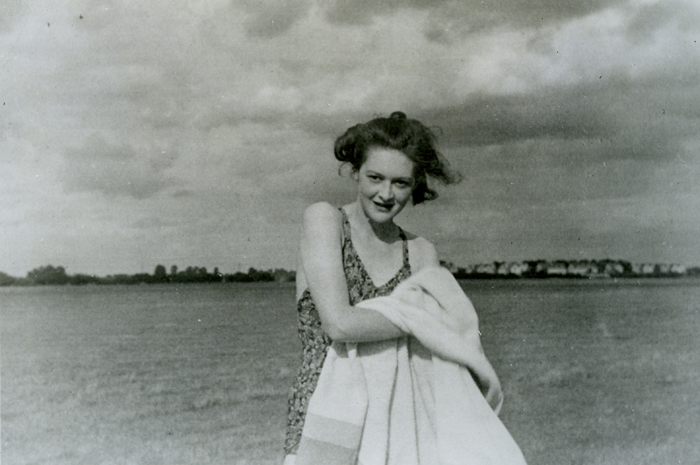
Photograph of the fictitious girlfriend Pam, carried by Martin

To reinforce the impression of Martin being a real person, Montagu and Cholmondeley provided corroborative details to be carried on his person – known in espionage circles as wallet or pocket litter. These included a photograph of an invented fiancée named Pam; the image was of an MI5 clerk, Jean Leslie. Two love letters from Pam were included in the pocket litter, (Note: According to Macintyre these were written by Hester Leggatt, Leslie's head of section; Smyth identifies the author as Paddy Bennett, later Lady Ridsdale, who claimed she had written them.) as was a receipt for a diamond engagement ring costing £53 10s 6d (Note: £53 10s 6d is approximately equivalent to £2109 in 2025) from a Bond Street jewellery shop. Additional personal correspondence was included, consisting of a letter from the fictitious Martin's father – described by Macintyre as "pompous and pedantic as only an Edwardian father could be" – which included a note from the family solicitor, and a message from Lloyds Bank, demanding payment of an overdraft of £79 19s 2d. (Note: £79 19s 2d is approximately equivalent to £3152 in 2025) To ensure that the letters would remain legible after immersion in seawater, Montagu asked MI5 scientists to conduct tests on different inks to see which would last longest in the water, and they provided him with a suitable list of popular and available ink brands.

Other items of pocket litter placed on Martin included a book of stamps, a silver cross and a St. Christopher's medallion, cigarettes, matches, a pencil stub, keys and a receipt from Gieves for a new shirt. To provide a date that Martin had been in London, ticket stubs from a London theatre and a bill for four nights' lodging at the Naval and Military Club were added. Along with the other items placed on him, an itinerary of his activity in London could be constructed from 18 to 24 April.

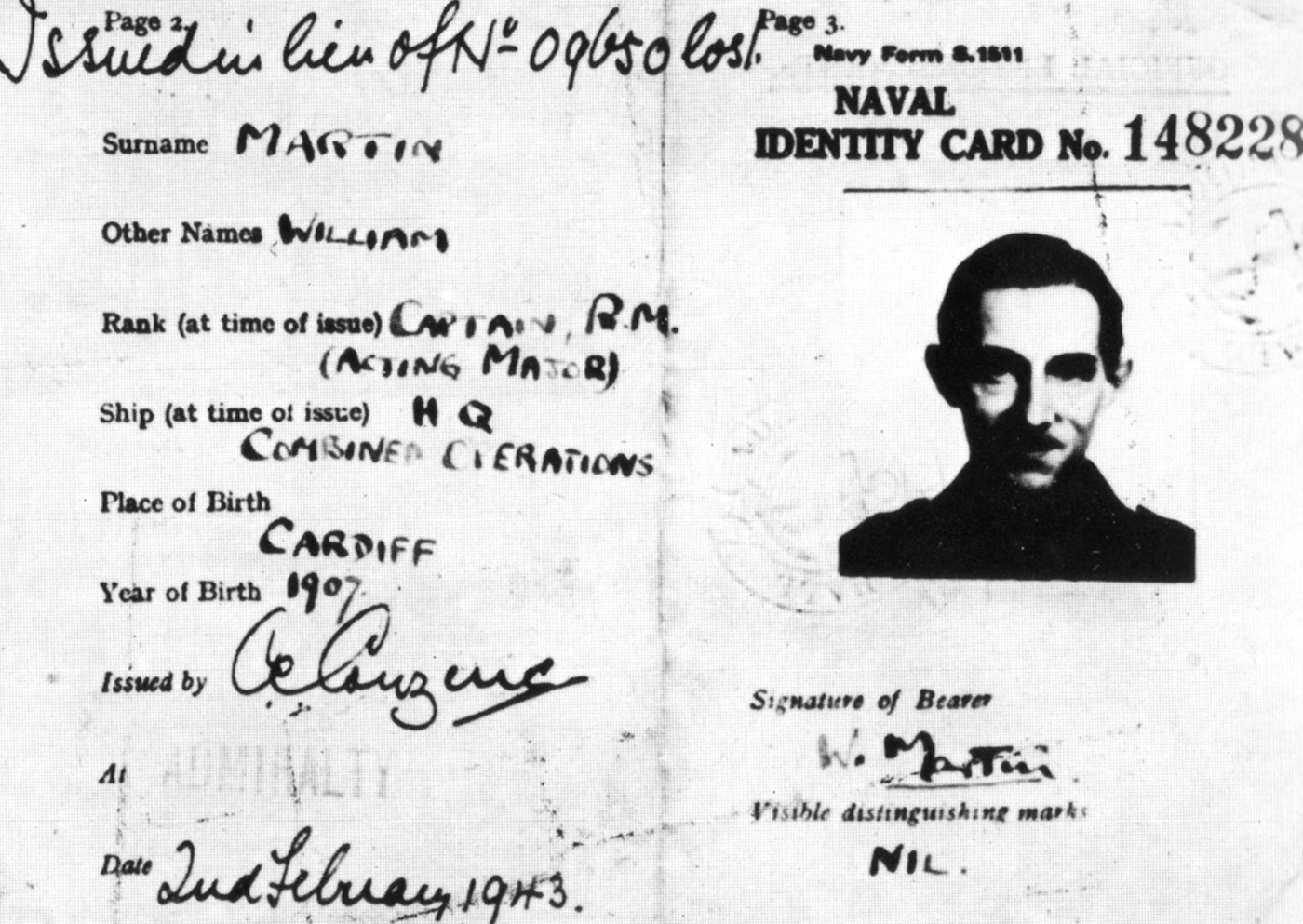
Naval identity card of Major Martin with photograph of Captain Ronnie Reed

Attempts were made to photograph the corpse for the naval identity card Martin would have to carry, but the results were unsatisfactory, and it was obvious that the images were of a cadaver. Montagu and Cholmondeley conducted a search for people who resembled the corpse, finding Captain Ronnie Reed of MI5; Reed agreed to be photographed for the identity card, wearing a Royal Marine uniform. As the three cards and passes needed to look not too new for a long-serving officer, they were issued as recent replacements for lost originals. Montagu spent the next few weeks rubbing all three cards on his trousers to provide a used sheen to them. To provide a used look to the uniform, it was worn by Cholmondeley, who was about the same build. The only non-issue part to the uniform was the underwear, which was in short supply in war-rationed Britain, so a pair of good-quality woollen underwear, owned by the late Herbert Fisher, the Warden of New College, Oxford, was used.

=== Deception documents ===
Montagu outlined three criteria for the document that contained the details of the falsified plans to land in the Balkans. He said that the target should be casually but clearly identified, that it should name Sicily and another location as cover, (Note: Montagu's thinking was that if the Germans thought that the document was part of a deception, Sicily should not be the obvious alternative. He thought there was a second advantage to this, that "if the Germans heard an accurate 'leak' about an invasion of Sicily, they might merely think that that was a part of our deception".) and that it should be in an unofficial correspondence that would not normally be sent by diplomatic courier, or encoded signal.

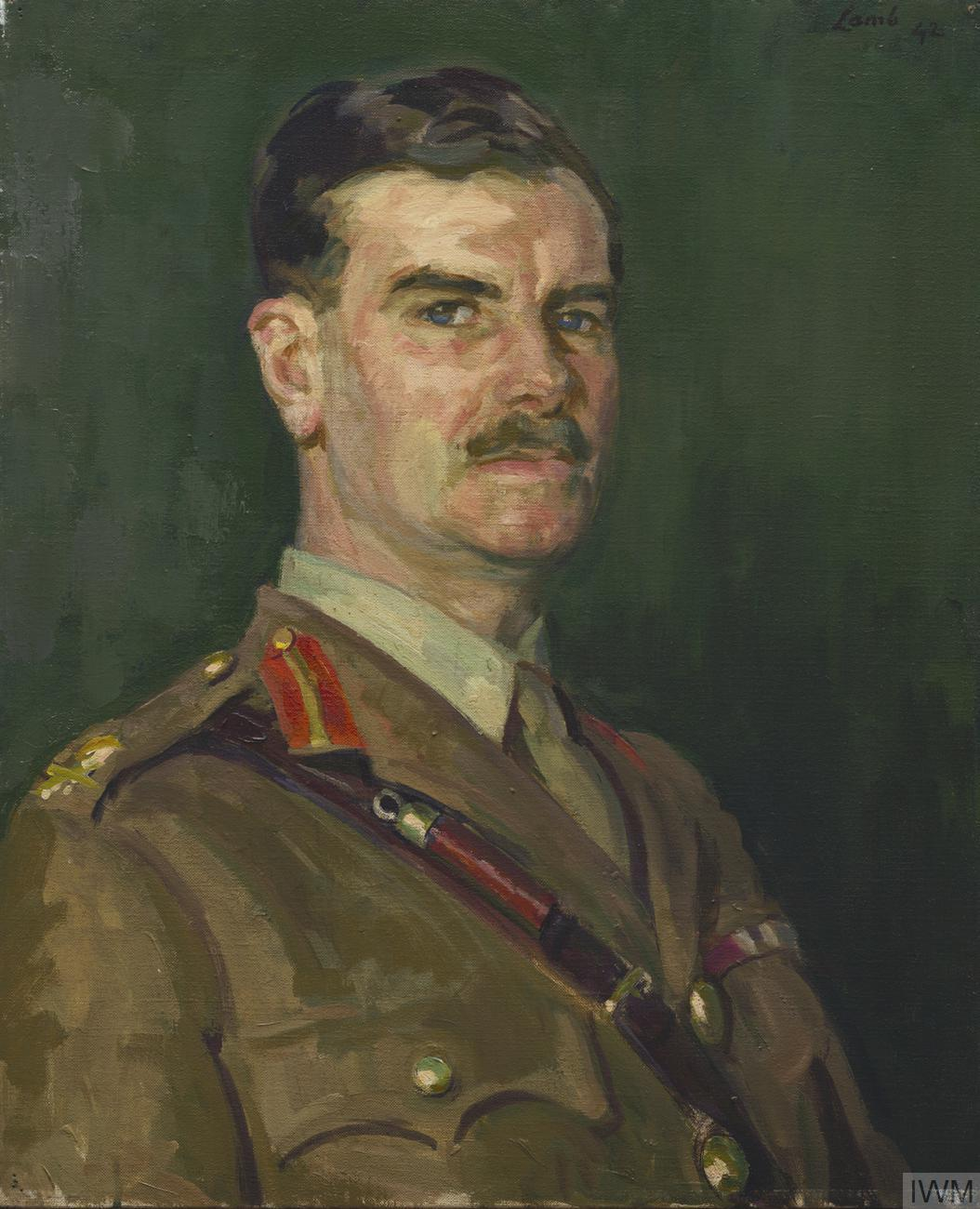
Nye wrote the deception letter

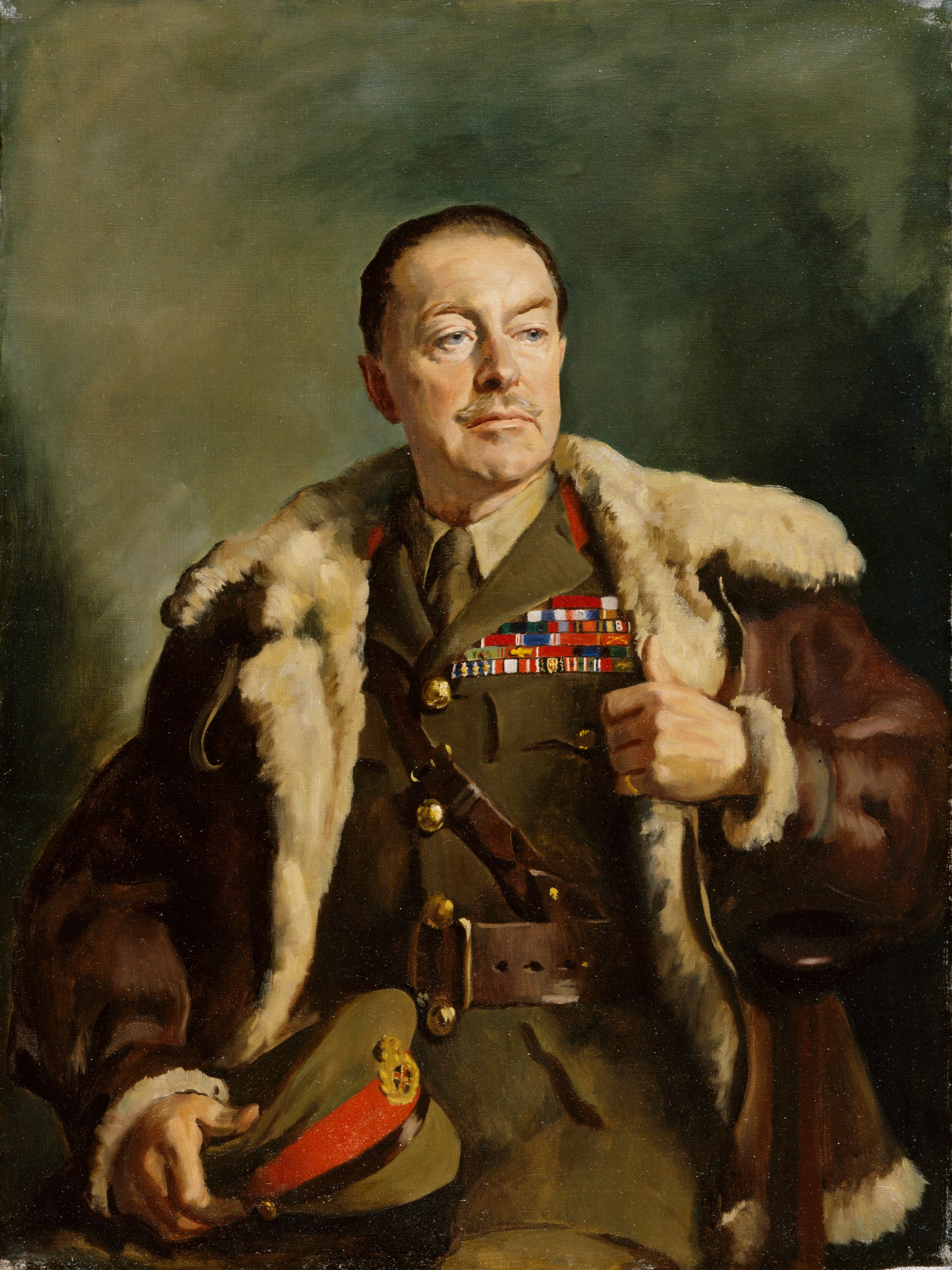
Alexander was the purported recipient

The main document was a personal letter from Lieutenant General Sir Archibald Nye, the vice chief of the Imperial General Staff – who had a deep knowledge of ongoing military operations – to General Sir Harold Alexander, commander of the Anglo-American 18th Army Group in Algeria and Tunisia under General Eisenhower. After several attempts at drafting the document did not generate something that was considered natural, it was suggested that Nye should draw up the letter himself to cover the required points. The letter covered several purportedly sensitive subjects, such as the (unwanted) award of Purple Heart medals by US forces to British servicemen serving with them and the appointment of a new commander of the Brigade of Guards. Montagu thought the result was "quite brilliant"; the key part of the letter stated that

We have recent information that the Boche [the Germans] have been reinforcing and strengthening their defences in Greece and Crete and C.I.G.S. [Chief of the Imperial General Staff] felt that our forces for the assault were insufficient. It was agreed by the Chiefs of Staff that the 5th Division should be reinforced by one Brigade Group for the assault on the beach south of CAPE ARAXOS and that a similar reinforcement should be made for the 56th Division at KALAMATA.

The letter went on to identify Sicily and the Dodecanese as "cover targets" for the assaults, along with justifications for their selection.

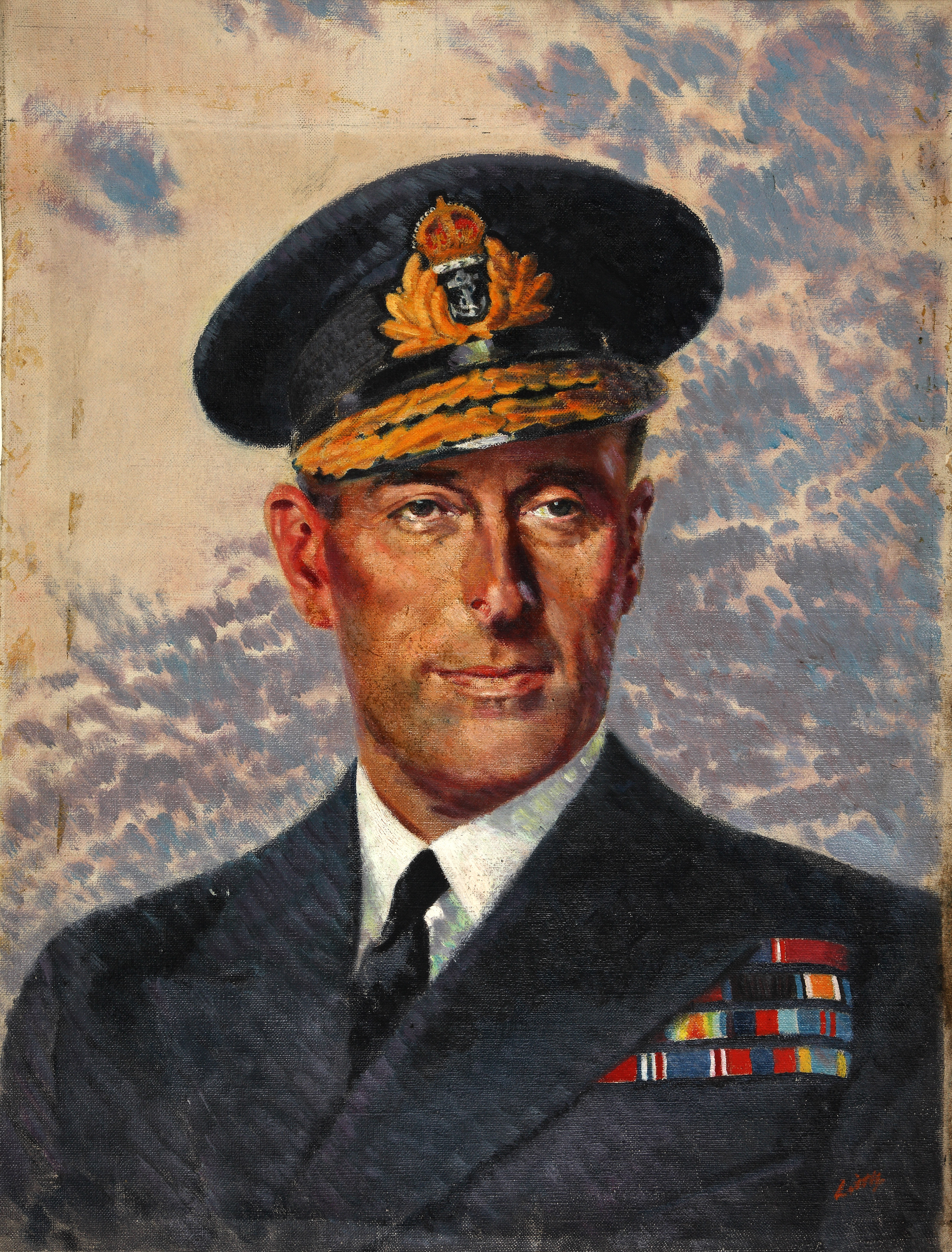
Vice Admiral Lord Louis Mountbatten, Martin's putative commanding officer

There was also a letter of introduction for Martin from his putative commanding officer, Vice-Admiral Lord Louis Mountbatten, the chief of Combined Operations, to Admiral of the Fleet Sir Andrew Cunningham, the commander-in-chief Mediterranean Fleet and Allied naval commander in the Mediterranean. Martin was referred to in the letter as an amphibious warfare expert on loan until "the assault is over". The document included a clumsy joke about sardines, which Montagu inserted in the hope that the Germans would see it as a reference to a planned invasion of Sardinia. A single black eyelash was placed within the letter to check if the Germans or Spanish had opened it.

Montagu considered that there would be a possible "Roman Catholic prejudice against tampering with corpses", which could miss the documents stored in the corpse's pockets, so they added them to an official briefcase that would not be overlooked. To justify carrying documents in a briefcase, Major Martin was given two proof copies of the official pamphlet on combined operations written by the author Hilary Saunders – then on Mountbatten's staff – and a letter from Mountbatten to Eisenhower, asking him to write a brief foreword for the pamphlet's US edition. The planning team first thought of having the handle clutched in the corpse's hand, held in place by rigor mortis, but the rigor would probably wear off and the briefcase would drift away. They therefore equipped Martin with a leather-covered chain, such as was used by bank and jewellery couriers to secure their cases against snatching. The chain unobtrusively runs down a sleeve to the case. To Montagu it seemed unlikely that the major would keep the bag secured to his wrist during the long flight from Britain, so the chain was looped around the belt of his trench coat.

=== Technical considerations; strategic approval ===
Huelva, southern Spain

Montagu and Cholmondeley gave consideration to the location of the corpse's delivery. It had long been assumed by the pair that the western coast of Spain would be the ideal location. Early in the planning they investigated the possibility of Portuguese and French coasts, but rejected those in favour of Huelva on the coast of southern Spain, after advice was taken from the Hydrographer of the Navy regarding the tides and currents best suited to ensure the body landed where it was wanted. Montagu later outlined that the choice of Huelva was also made because "there was a very active German agent ... who had excellent contacts with certain Spaniards, both officials and others". The agent – Adolf Clauss, a member of the Abwehr – was the son of the German consul, and operated under the cover of an agriculture technician; he was an efficient and effective operative. Huelva was also chosen because the British vice-consul in the city, Francis Haselden, was "a reliable and helpful man" who could be relied upon, according to Montagu.

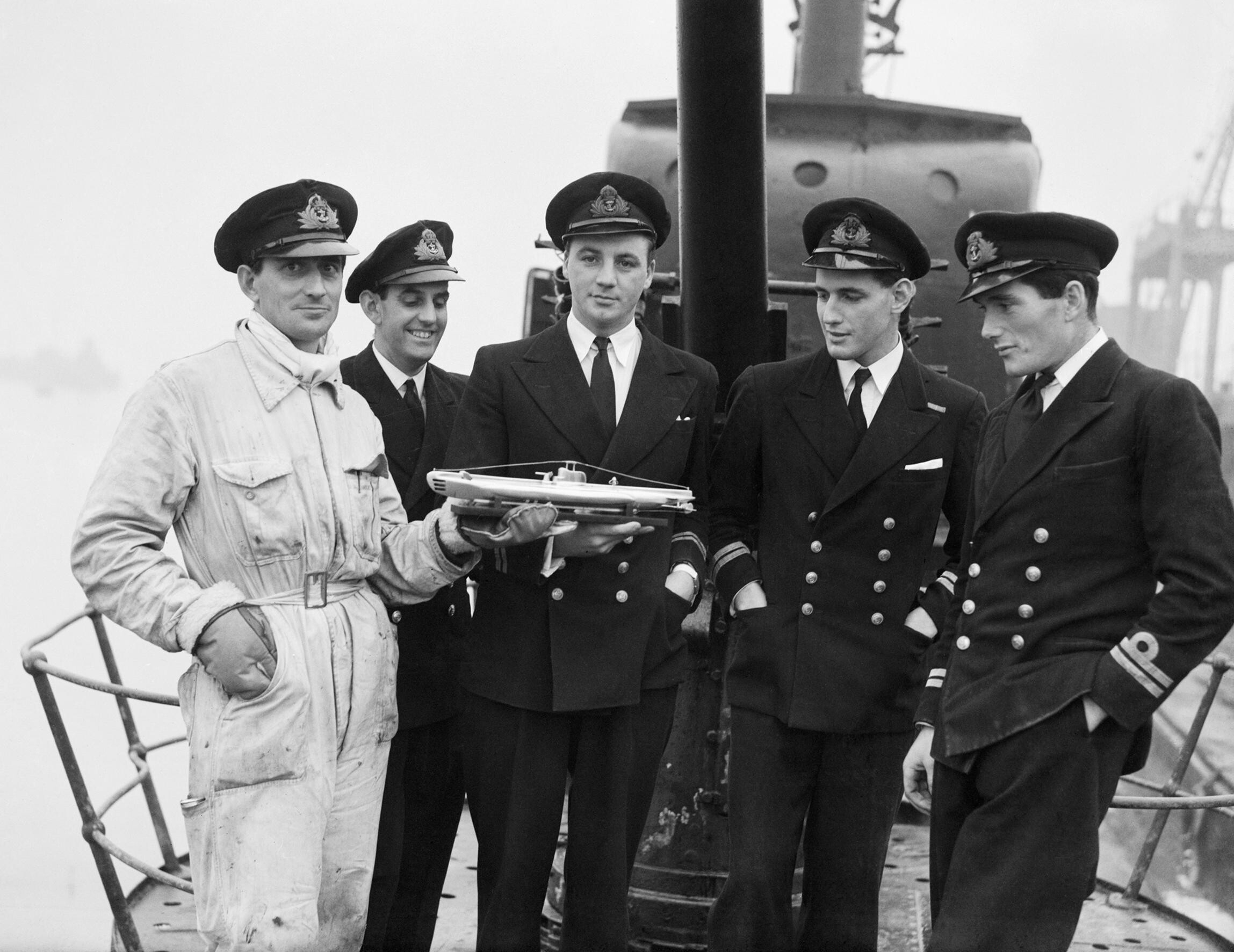
The officers of HMS Seraph, the submarine selected for the operation, on board in December 1943

The body was supposed to be the victim of an aeroplane crash, and it was decided that trying to simulate the accident at sea using flares and other devices could be too risky and open to discovery. After seaplanes and surface ships were dismissed as being problematic, a submarine was chosen as the method of delivering the corpse to the region. To transport the body by submarine, it needed to be contained within the body of the boat, as any externally mounted container would have to be built with a skin so thick it would alter the level of the waterline. The canister needed to remain airtight and keep the corpse as fresh as possible through its journey. Spilsbury provided the medical requirements and Cholmondeley contacted Charles Fraser-Smith of the Ministry of Supply (Note: Fraser-Smith worked in Q Branch producing specialist equipment for agents, members of the Special Operations Executive and prisoners of war; he also supplied Ian Fleming with equipment and was the basis for the character Q in the Bond novels.) to produce the container, which was labelled "Handle with care: optical instruments".

On 13 April 1943 the committee of the Chiefs of Staff met and agreed that they thought the plan should proceed. The committee informed Colonel John Bevan – the head of London Controlling Section, which controlled the planning and co-ordination of deception operations – that he needed to obtain final approval from Churchill. Two days later Bevan met the prime minister – who was in bed, wearing a dressing gown and smoking a cigar – in his rooms at the Cabinet War offices and explained the plan. He warned Churchill that there were several aspects that could go wrong, including that the Spaniards might pass the corpse back to the British, with the papers unread. Churchill replied that "in that case we shall have to get the body back and give it another swim". Churchill gave his approval to the operation, but delegated the final confirmation to Eisenhower, the overall military commander in the Mediterranean, whose plan to invade Sicily would be affected. Bevan sent an encrypted telegram to Eisenhower's headquarters in Algeria requesting final confirmation, which was received on 17 April.

== Execution ==
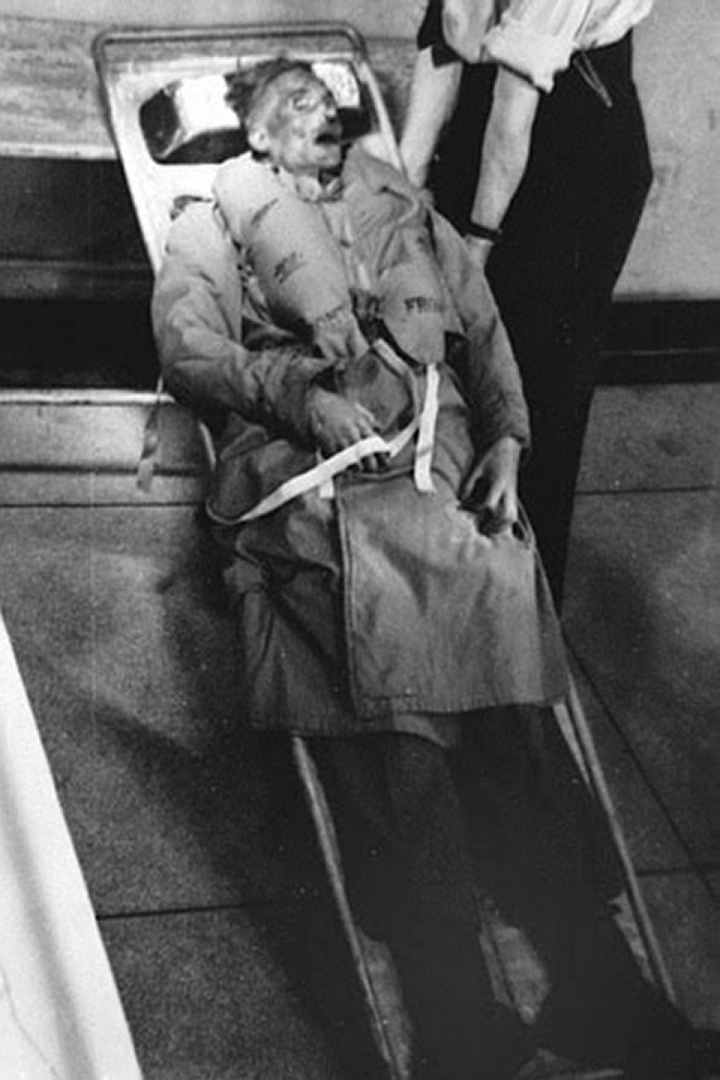
The corpse of Glyndwr Michael, dressed as Martin, just prior to placement in the canister

In the early hours of 17 April 1943 the corpse of Michael was dressed as Martin, although there was one last-minute hitch: the feet had frozen. Purchase, Montagu and Cholmondeley could not put the boots on, so an electric heater was located and the feet defrosted enough to put the boots on properly. The pocket litter was placed on the body, and the briefcase attached. The body was placed in the canister, which was filled with 21 pounds (9.5 kg) of dry ice and sealed up. When the dry ice sublimated, it filled the canister with carbon dioxide and drove out any oxygen, thus preserving the body without refrigeration. The canister was placed in the 1937 Fordson van of an MI5 driver, St John "Jock" Horsfall, who had been a racing champion before the war. Cholmondeley and Montagu travelled in the back of the van, which drove through the night to Greenock, west Scotland, where the canister was taken on board the submarine HMS Seraph, which was preparing for a deployment to the Mediterranean. Seraph's commander, Lt. Bill Jewell, and crew had previous special operations experience. Jewell told his men that the canister contained a top secret meteorological device to be deployed near Spain.

On 19 April Seraph set sail and arrived just off the coast of Huelva on 29 April after having been bombed twice en route. After spending the day reconnoitring the coastline, at 4:15 am on 30 April, Seraph surfaced. Jewell had the canister brought up on deck, then sent all his crew below except the officers. They opened the container and lowered the body into the water. Jewell read Psalm 39 and ordered the engines to full astern; the wash from the screws pushed the corpse toward the shore. The canister was reloaded and the submarine travelled 12 miles (19 km) out where it surfaced and the empty container was pushed into the water. As it floated, it was riddled with machine gun fire so that it would sink. Because of the air trapped in the insulation, this effort failed, and the canister was destroyed with plastic explosives. Jewell afterwards sent a message to the Admiralty to say "Mincemeat completed", and continued on to Gibraltar.

== Spanish handling of the corpse and the ramifications ==
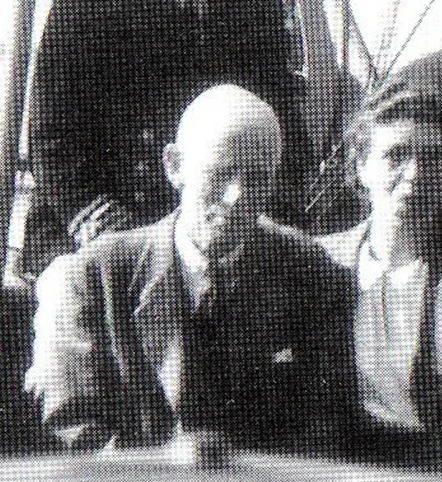
Francis Haselden, the British Vice-Consul who attended the autopsy

The body of "Major Martin" was found at around 9:30 am on 30 April 1943 by a local fisherman; (Note: Macintyre gives the name as José Antonio Rey María; Smyth gives it as José Buceta Flores.) it was taken to Huelva by Spanish soldiers, where it was handed over to a naval judge. Haselden, as vice-consul, was officially informed by the Spaniards; he reported back to the Admiralty that the body and briefcase had been found. A series of pre-scripted diplomatic cables were sent between Haselden and Alan Hillgarth, the naval attaché in Madrid, which continued for several days. The British knew that these were being intercepted and, although they were encrypted, the Germans had broken the code; the messages played out the story that it was imperative that Haselden retrieve the briefcase because it was important.

At midday on 1 May an autopsy was undertaken on Michael's body; Haselden was present and – in order to minimise the possibilities that the two Spanish doctors would discover that the body was a three-month-old corpse – asked if, in the heat of the day and smell of the corpse, the doctors should bring the post mortem to a close and have lunch. They agreed and signed a death certificate for Major William Martin for "asphyxiation through immersion in the sea"; the body was released by the Spanish and, as Major Martin, was buried in the San Marco section of Nuestra Señora cemetery in Huelva, with full military honours on 2 May.

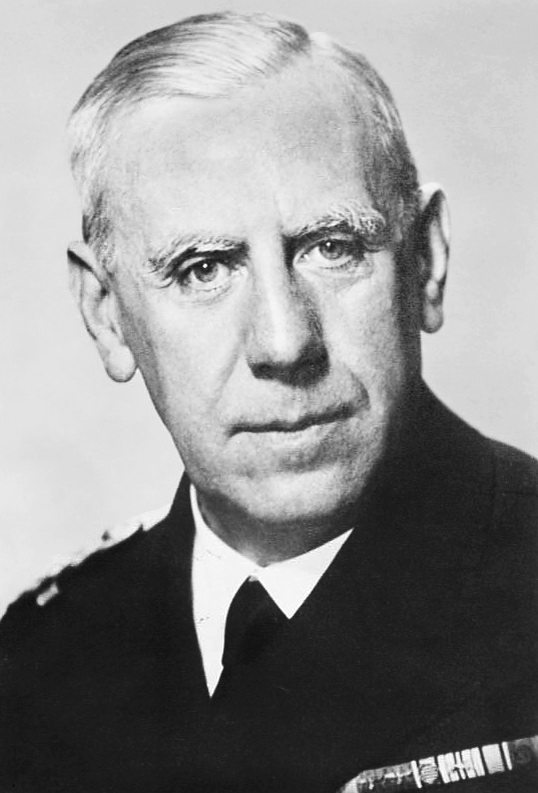
Admiral Wilhelm Canaris, the head of the Abwehr, who intervened to obtain the Mincemeat documents

The Spanish navy retained the briefcase and, despite pressure from Adolf Clauss and some of his Abwehr agents, neither it nor its contents were handed over to the Germans. On 5 May the briefcase was passed to the naval headquarters at San Fernando near Cádiz, for forwarding to Madrid. While at San Fernando the contents were photographed by German sympathisers, but the letters were not opened. Once the briefcase arrived in Madrid, its contents became the focus of attention of Karl-Erich Kühlenthal, one of the most senior Abwehr agents in Spain. He asked Admiral Wilhelm Canaris, the head of the Abwehr, to personally intervene and persuade the Spanish to surrender the documents. Acceding to the request, the Spanish removed the still-damp paper by tightly winding it around a probe into a cylindrical shape, and then pulling it out between the envelope flap – which was still closed by a wax seal – and the envelope body. The letters were dried and photographed, then soaked in salt water for 24 hours before being re-inserted into their envelopes, without the eyelash that had been planted there. The information was passed to the Germans on 8 May. This was deemed so important by the Abwehr agents in Spain that Kühlenthal personally took the documents to Germany.

On 11 May the briefcase, complete with the documents, was returned to Hillgarth by the Spanish authorities; he forwarded it to London in the diplomatic bag. On receipt, the documents were forensically examined, and the absence of the eyelash noted. Further tests showed that the fibres in the paper had been damaged by folding more than once, which confirmed that the letters had been extracted and read. An additional test was made as the papers – still wet by the time they returned to London – were dried out: the folded paper dried into the rolled form it had when the Spaniards had extracted it from the envelope. To allay any potential German fears that their activities had been discovered, another pre-arranged encrypted but breakable cable was sent to Haselden stating that the envelopes had been examined and that they had not been opened; Hillgarth leaked the news to Spaniards known to be sympathetic to the Germans.

Final proof that the Germans had been passed the information from the letters came on 14 May when a German communication was decrypted by the Ultra source of signals intelligence produced by the Government Code and Cypher School (GC&CS) at Bletchley Park. The message, which had been sent two days previously, warned that the invasion was to be in the Balkans, with a feint to the Dodecanese. A message was sent by Brigadier Leslie Hollis – the secretary to the Chiefs of Staff Committee – to Churchill, then in the United States. It read "Mincemeat swallowed rod, line and sinker by the right people and from the best information they look like acting on it."

Montagu continued the deception to reinforce the existence of Major Martin, and included his details in the published list of British casualties which appeared in The Times on 4 June. By coincidence, also published that day were the names of two other officers who had died when their plane was lost at sea, and opposite the casualty listings was a report that the film star Leslie Howard had been shot down by the Luftwaffe and died in the Bay of Biscay; both stories gave credence to the Major Martin story.

== German reaction ==
On 14 May 1943 Grand Admiral Karl Dönitz met Hitler to discuss Dönitz's recent visit to Italy, his meeting with the Italian leader Benito Mussolini and the progress of the war. The Admiral, referring to the Mincemeat documents as the "Anglo-Saxon order", recorded

The Führer does not agree with ... [Mussolini] that the most likely invasion point is Sicily. Furthermore, he believes that the discovered Anglo-Saxon order confirms the assumption that the planned attacks will be directed mainly against Sardinia and the Peloponnesus.

Hitler informed Mussolini that Greece, Sardinia and Corsica must be defended "at all costs", and that German troops would be best placed to do the job. He ordered that the experienced 1st Panzer Division be transferred from France to Salonika, Greece. The order was intercepted by GC&CS on 21 May. By the end of June, German troop strength on Sardinia had been doubled to 10,000, with fighter aircraft also based there as support. German torpedo boats were moved from Sicily to the Greek islands in preparation. Seven German divisions transferred to Greece, raising the number present to eight, and ten were posted to the Balkans, raising the number present to eighteen.

On 9 July the Allies invaded Sicily in Operation Husky. German signals intercepted by GC&CS showed that even four hours after the invasion of Sicily began, twenty-one aircraft left Sicily to reinforce Sardinia. For a considerable time after the initial invasion, Hitler was still convinced that an attack on the Balkans was imminent, and in late July he sent General Erwin Rommel to Salonika to prepare the defence of the region. By the time the German high command realised the mistake, it was too late to make a difference.

== Aftermath ==
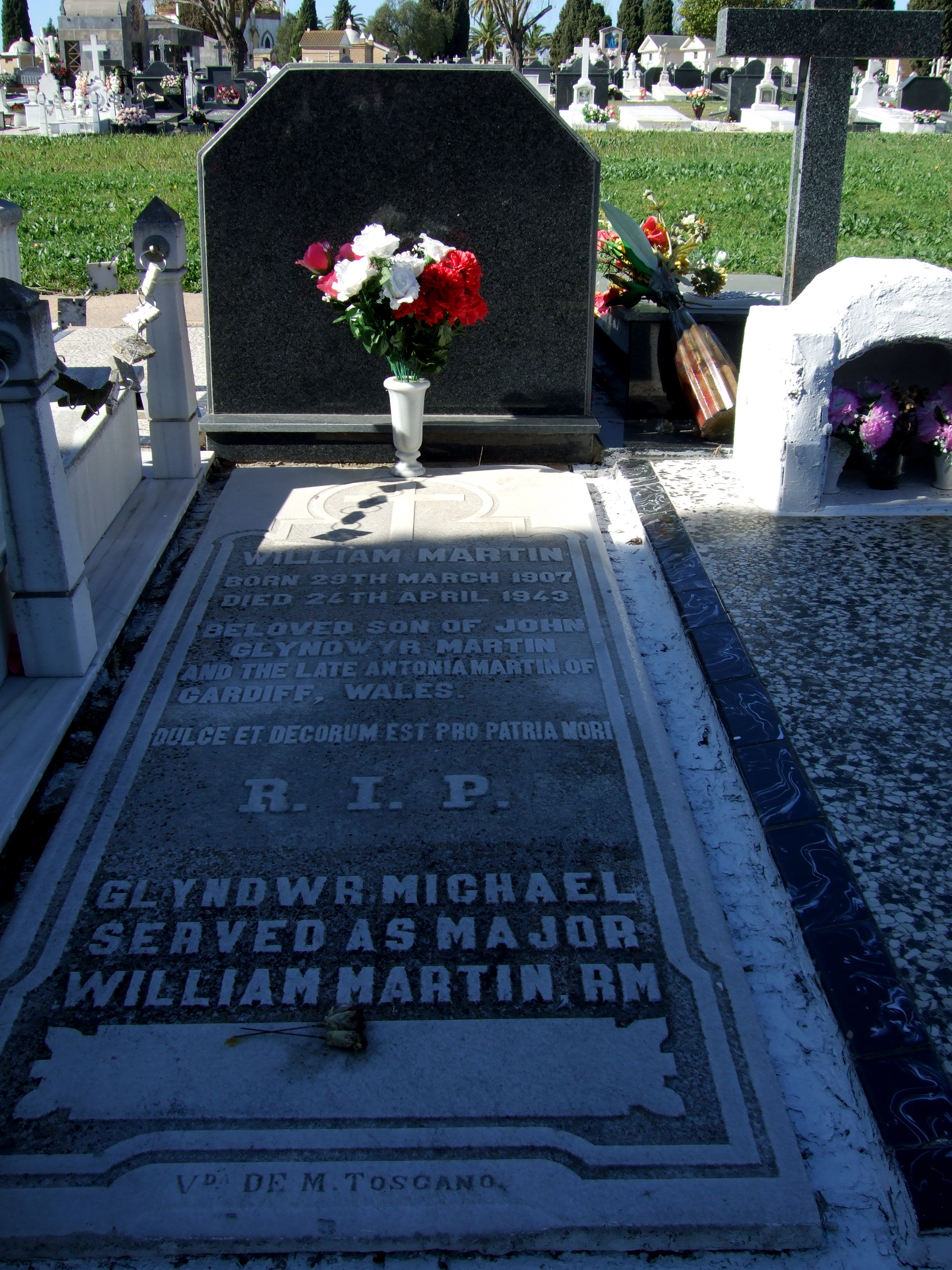
Grave of Glyndwr Michael in Huelva, Spain

On 25 July 1943, as the battle for Sicily went against the Axis forces, the Italian Grand Council of Fascism voted to limit the power of Mussolini, and handed control of the Italian armed forces over to King Victor Emmanuel III. The following day Mussolini met the King, who dismissed him as prime minister; the former dictator was then imprisoned. A new Italian government took power and began secret negotiations with the Allies. Sicily fell on 17 August after a force of 65,000 Germans held off 400,000 American and British troops long enough to allow many of the Germans to evacuate to the Italian mainland.

The military historian Jon Latimer observes that the relative ease with which the Allies captured Sicily was not entirely because of Mincemeat, or the wider deception of Operation Barclay. Latimer identifies other factors, including Hitler's distrust of the Italians, and his unwillingness to risk German troops alongside Italian troops who may have been on the point of a general surrender. The military historian Michael Howard, while describing Mincemeat as "perhaps the most successful single deception operation of the entire war", considered Mincemeat and Barclay to have had less impact on the course of the Sicily campaign than Hitler's "congenital obsession with the Balkans". Macintyre writes that the exact impact of Mincemeat is impossible to calculate. Although the British had expected 10,000 killed or wounded in the first week of fighting, only a seventh of that number became casualties; the navy expected 300 ships would be sunk in the action, but they lost 12. The predicted 90-day campaign was over in 38.

Smyth writes that as a result of Husky, Hitler suspended the Kursk offensive on 13 July. This was partly because of the performance of the Soviet army, but partly because he still assumed that the Allied landing on Sicily was a feint that preceded the invasion in the Balkans, and he wanted to have troops available for fast deployment to meet them. Smyth observes that once Hitler gave up the initiative to the Soviets, he never regained it.

== Legacy ==
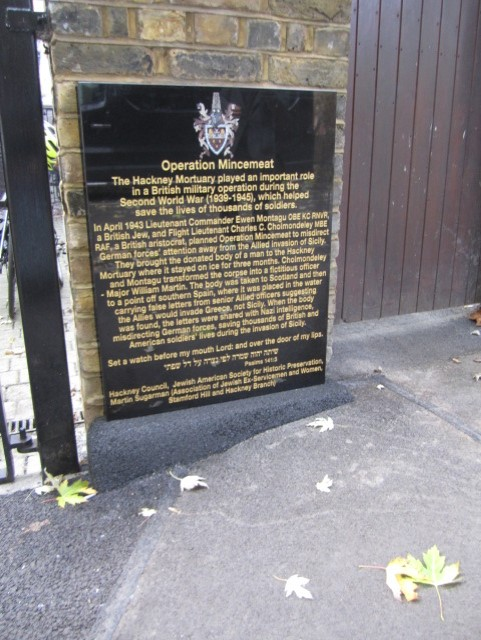
Historical marker, adjacent to the Hackney Mortuary

Montagu was appointed an Officer of the Order of the British Empire in 1944 for his part in Operation Mincemeat; for masterminding the plan, Cholmondeley was appointed a member of the order in 1948. The Commonwealth War Graves Commission took responsibility for Major Martin's grave in Huelva in 1977. In 1997 the Commission added the postscript "Glyndwr Michael served as Major William Martin RM". In November 2021 the Jewish American Society for Historic Preservation, working with the Association of Jewish Ex-Servicemen and Women and the London Borough of Hackney, placed a memorial at the Hackney Mortuary.

Duff Cooper, a former cabinet minister who had been briefed on the operation in March 1943, published the novel Operation Heartbreak (1950), which contained the plot device of a corpse – with papers naming him as William Maryngton – being floated off the coast of Spain with false documents to deceive the Germans. The British security services decided that the best response was to publish the story of Mincemeat. Over the course of a weekend Montagu wrote The Man Who Never Was (1953), which sold two million copies and formed the basis for a 1956 film starring Clifton Webb and Gloria Grahame. The security services did not give Montagu complete freedom to reveal operational details, and he was careful not to mention the role played by signals intelligence to confirm that the operation had been successful. He was also careful to obscure "the idea of an organised programme of strategic deception ... with Mincemeat being presented as a 'wild' one-off caper". In 1977 Montagu published Beyond Top Secret U, his wartime autobiography which gave further details of Mincemeat, among other operations. In 2010 the journalist Ben Macintyre published Operation Mincemeat, a history of the events.

A 1956 episode of The Goon Show, titled "The Man Who Never Was", was set during the Second World War, and referred to a microfilm washed up on a beach inside a German boot. The play Operation Mincemeat, written by Adrian Jackson and Farhana Sheikh, was first staged by the Cardboard Citizens theatre company in 2001. The work focused on Michael's homelessness. In his book The Double Agents, the writer W. E. B. Griffin depicts Operation Mincemeat as an American operation run by the Office of Strategic Services. Fictional characters are blended with Ian Fleming and the actors David Niven and Peter Ustinov.

The story was the basis for the 2014 musical Dead in the Water, performed at the Camden, Brighton and Guildford Fringe Festivals in 2014. In 2015 the Welsh theatre company Theatr na nÓg produced Y dyn na fu erioed (The Man Who Never Was), a musical based on the operation and Glyndwr Michael's upbringing in Aberbargoed. The musical was performed by primary school children from Caerphilly County Borough during that year's Eisteddfod yr Urdd. Another musical, Operation Mincemeat, is also based on the operation. Created by the musical comedy troupe SpitLip, it opened off-West End in London in 2019 and subsequently transferred to the West End in 2023 and to Broadway in 2025.

In 2014 a BBC television miniseries, Fleming: The Man Who Would Be Bond, dramatised some aspects of Operation Mincemeat, and Fleming's connection to the operation. In 2021 the film Operation Mincemeat was released, with Colin Firth as Montagu and Matthew Macfadyen as Cholmondeley.

== See also ==
- Operation Copperhead – 1944 military deception operation
- Operation Bodyguard – World War II deception plan during the build-up to the 1944 Normandy landings

== Notes and references ==
=== Sources ===
==== Books ====
- Andrew, Christopher (2010). The Defence of the Realm. London: Penguin Books. ISBN 978-0-14-102330-4.
- Arnold-Forster, Mark (2001). The World at War. London: Pimlico. ISBN 978-0-7126-6782-1. Archived from the original on 12 October 2020.
- Arthur, Max (2004). Forgotten Voices of the Second World War. London: Random House. ISBN 978-0-09-189734-5.
- Buell, Thomas B (2002). The Second World War: Europe and the Mediterranean. Garden City Park, NY: Square One Publishers. ISBN 978-0-7570-0160-4. Archived from the original on 10 October 2020.
- Cave Brown, Anthony (1975). Bodyguard of Lies. London: WH Allen. ISBN 978-0-491-01636-0.
- Chancellor, Henry (2005). James Bond: The Man and His World. London: John Murray. ISBN 978-0-7195-6815-2.
- Crowdy, Terry (2008). Deceiving Hitler: Double-Cross and Deception in World War II. Oxford: Osprey. ISBN 978-1-84603-135-9.
- Holt, Thaddeus (2004). The Deceivers: Allied Military Deception in the Second World War. London: Weidenfeld & Nicolson. ISBN 978-0-297-84804-2.
- Howard, Michael (1990). British Intelligence in the Second World War. London: HMSO. ISBN 978-0-11-630954-9.
- Howard, Michael (1995). Strategic Deception in the Second World War. New York: W. W. Norton & Company. ISBN 978-0-393-31293-5.
- Latimer, Jon (2001). Deception in War. London: John Murray. ISBN 978-0-7195-5605-0.
- Macintyre, Ben (2010). Operation Mincemeat. London: Bloomsbury. ISBN 978-1-4088-0921-1.
- Mitcham, Samuel; Stauffenberg, Friedrich von (2007). The Battle of Sicily: How the Allies Lost Their Chance for Total Victory. Mechanicsburg, PA: Stackpole Books. ISBN 978-0-8117-3403-5.
- Montagu, Ewen (1979) [1977]. Beyond Top Secret U. London: Corgi. ISBN 978-0-552-11040-2.
- Montagu, Ewen (1996) [1953]. The Man Who Never Was. Annapolis, MD: Naval Institute Press. ISBN 978-1-55750-448-7.
- Quartermaine, Luisa (2000). Mussolini's Last Republic: Propaganda and Politics in the Italian Social Republic (R.S.I.) 1943–45. Bristol: Intellect Books. ISBN 978-1-902454-08-5.
- Smyth, Denis (2010). Deathly Deception: The Real Story of Operation Mincemeat. London: Oxford University Press. ISBN 978-0-19-923398-4.
- Staniforth, Andrew; Sampson, Fraser (2012). The Routledge Companion to UK Counter-Terrorism. London: Routledge. ISBN 978-1-136-25429-1. Archived from the original on 8 October 2020.
- Wilmut, Roger; Grafton, Jimmy (1981). The Goon Show Companion: A History and Goonography. London: Robson Books. ISBN 978-0-903895-64-4.
- Zabecki, David T. (1999). World War Two in Europe. New York & London: Taylor & Francis. ISBN 978-0-8240-7029-8. Archived from the original on 15 October 2020.

==== Journals, newspapers and magazines ====
- Aldrich, Richard J. (September 2004). "Policing the Past: Official History, Secrecy and British Intelligence since 1945" (PDF). The English Historical Review. 119 (483): 922–953. doi:10.1093/ehr/119.483.922. JSTOR 3490693. Archived (PDF) from the original on 9 October 2020.(subscription required)
- "The Double Agents". Buffalo and Erie County Public Library. Archived from the original on 20 December 2016.
- Ezard, John (29 October 1996). "Mystery Warrior Identified". The Guardian. p. 6.
- Ferguson, Euan (24 January 2010). "Operation Mincemeat by Ben Macintyre". The Observer. Archived from the original on 10 May 2019.
- Foot, M. R. D. (2004). "Montagu, Ewen Edward Samuel (1901–1985)". Oxford Dictionary of National Biography (online ed.). Oxford University Press. doi:10.1093/ref:odnb/31458. (Subscription, Wikipedia Library access or UK public library membership required.)
- Gregory, Julia (3 December 2021). "Operation Mincemeat: Role of Hackney mortuary marked in Colin Firth film". Hackney Gazette. Archived from the original on 4 December 2021.
- "Jean Gerard Leigh". The Daily Telegraph. 5 April 2012. Archived from the original on 12 January 2022.
- John, Emma (10 May 2023). "Operation Mincemeat review – irrepressible wartime musical is a West End triumph". The Guardian.
- Leigh, Danny (13 April 2022). "Operation Mincemeat — Colin Firth stars in a drama of wartime intrigue and deception". Financial Times.
- Logan, Brian (16 June 2009). "The Man Who Really Was". The Times. London. p. 14.
- Macintyre, Ben (5 April 2008). "Bond – the real Bond". The Times. p. 36.
- Morgan, Roger (1986). "The Man Who Almost Is". After the Battle (54): 1–25.
- Morgan, Roger (November 1996). "The Second World War's Best Kept Secret Revealed". After the Battle (94).
- Murray, Scott (12 February 2014). "Facts as thrilling as the fiction". The Sydney Morning Herald.
- Norwich, John (13 November 2003). "The Corpse That Fooled Hitler". The Times. p. 10.
- Smith, Capt. Kevin D. (July–August 2002). "Coming Into its Own: The Contribution of Intelligence at the Battle of Alam Halfa". Military Review: 74–77.
- Wyver, Kate (27 May 2019). "Operation Mincemeat review – baggy burlesque of British secret service". The Guardian.
- "Y dyn 'newidiodd gwrs y rhyfel'" (in Welsh). BBC. 27 April 2015.

==== Internet and television media ====
- "Glyndwr Michael from Aberbargoed inspires Urdd Eisteddfod primary show". Urdd Gobaith Cymru. May 2015.
- "Huelva Roman Catholic Cemetery". Commonwealth War Graves Commission.
- Macintyre, Ben (5 December 2010). Operation Mincemeat (Television production). BBC.
- "Michael, Glyndwr". Commonwealth War Graves Commission.
- Payne, Jen (3 September 2014). "Dead in the Water – A Musical Tragicomedy: 5 star review by Jen Payne". Broadway Baby.
- Travis, Ben (5 October 2021). "Colin Firth Plots To Trick Hitler In The Operation Mincemeat Trailer". Empire.
