= The Man Who Never Was (book) =

1953 book by Ewen Montagu

- Author: Ewen Montagu
- Language: English
- Subject: Operation Mincemeat
- Genre: Non-fiction
- Publisher: Evans Brothers, J.B. Lippincott Company
- Publication date: 1953
- Publication place: United Kingdom
- Media type: Print (hardcover)
- Pages: 144
- ISBN: 978-0-590-02600-0
- OCLC: 804308774

The Man Who Never Was is a 1953 book by Ewen Montagu about the World War II Operation Mincemeat. Montagu played a leading role in the 1943 scheme to deceive the Germans about the planned Allied invasion of Sicily. The scheme entailed releasing a dead body just off the coast of Spain, where strong currents caused it to drift ashore in an area where a skilled German secret agent was known to operate. The corpse was to appear to be the victim of an airplane crash, the non-existent Royal Marine Captain (Acting Major) William Martin, who had letters in a briefcase that hinted at a forthcoming Allied invasion of Greece and Sardinia, rather than the obvious target of Sicily.

Montagu's work formed the basis for a 1956 film by the same title.

== Background ==
In 1950 Duff Cooper, a former cabinet minister who had been briefed on the operation in March 1943, published the spy novel Operation Heartbreak, which contained the plot device of a corpse – with papers naming him as William Martin – being floated off the coast of Spain with false documents to deceive the Germans. The British security services decided that the best response was to publish the story of Mincemeat. Over the course of a weekend Montagu wrote The Man Who Never Was (1953), which sold two million copies and formed the basis for a 1956 film. The security services did not give Montagu complete freedom to reveal operational details, and he was careful not to mention the role played by signals intelligence to confirm that the operation had been successful. He was also careful to obscure "the idea of an organised programme of strategic deception ... with Mincemeat being presented as a 'wild' one-off caper". In 1977 Montagu published Beyond Top Secret U, his wartime autobiography, which gave further details of Mincemeat, among other operations.

== Offsite links ==
- Montagu, Ewen (1954). The Man Who Never Was. Philadelphia and New York: J. B. Lippincott Company.

== Sources ==
- Aldrich, Richard J. (September 2004). "Policing the Past: Official History, Secrecy and British Intelligence since 1945". The English Historical Review. 199 (483): 922–953. doi:10.1093/ehr/119.483.922. JSTOR 3490693.
- Ezard, John (29 October 1996). "Mystery Warrior Identified". The Guardian. p. 6.
- Foot, M. R. D. (2004). "Montagu, Ewen Edward Samuel (1901–1985)". Oxford Dictionary of National Biography (online ed.). Oxford University Press. doi:10.1093/ref:odnb/31458. (Subscription, Wikipedia Library access or UK public library membership required.)
- Macintyre, Ben (2010). Operation Mincemeat. London: Bloomsbury. ISBN 978-1-4088-0921-1.
- Montagu, Ewen (1996) [1953]. The Man Who Never Was. Annapolis, MD: Naval Institute Press. ISBN 978-1-55750-448-7.
