= William Martin (Royal Marines officer) =

Persona invented for Operation Mincemeat

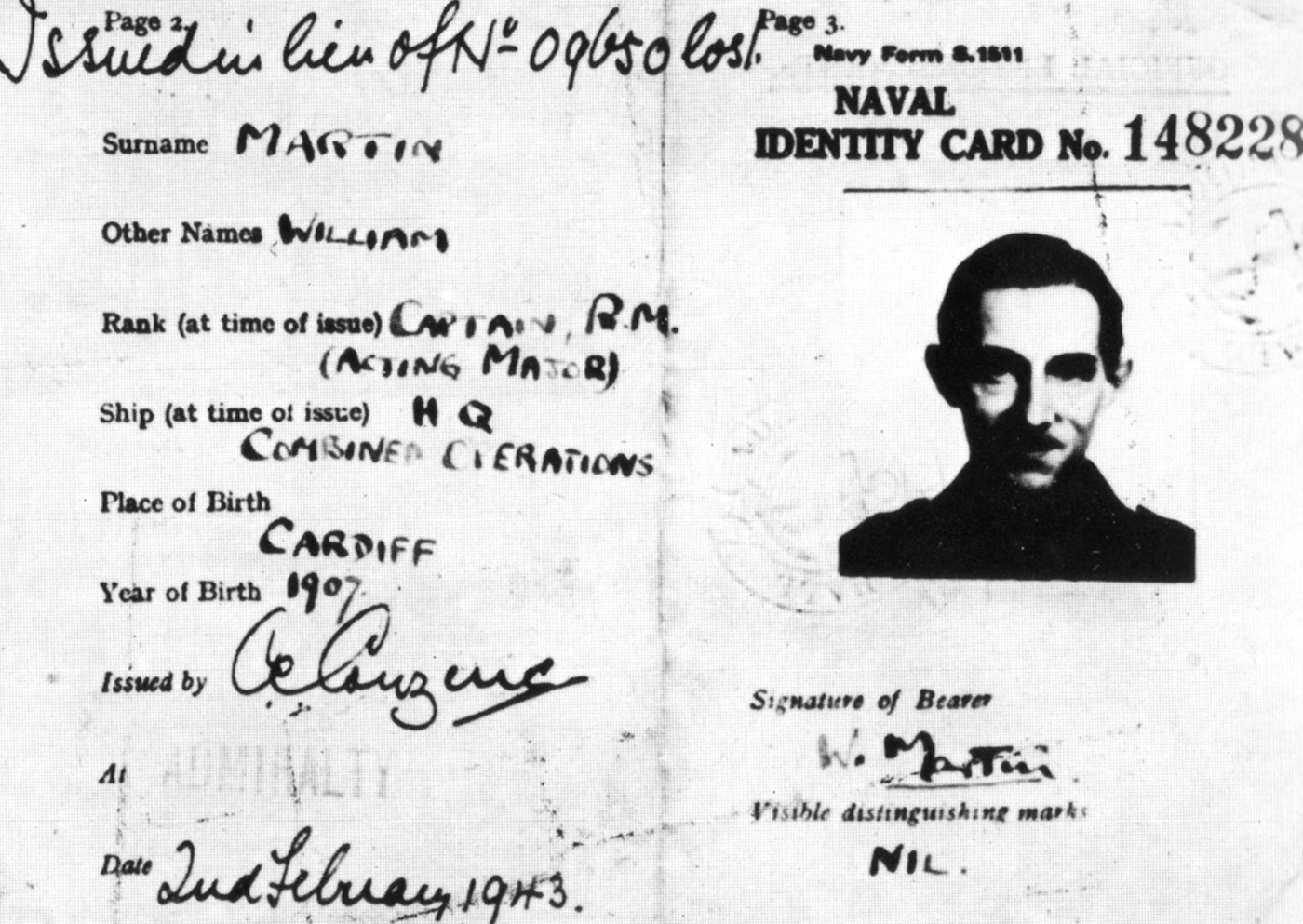
Identity card of Major William Martin, Royal Marines

Major William Martin was a persona invented by British Military Intelligence for Operation Mincemeat, a Second World War deception plan that lured German forces to Greece prior to the Allied invasion of Sicily. Also known as "The Man Who Never Was" (Welsh: Y Dyn Na Fu Erioed), Martin's personal details were created to lend credence to the scheme, which involved a body dressed as a British officer and carrying secret documents washing up on the shore of neutral Spain, apparently the victim of an air crash. It was intended that these documents, containing information that suggested an Allied assault on Greece was planned, should fall into the hands of German intelligence.

The identity of the body employed as Major Martin was kept secret during and after the war, and was the source of some speculation. The body was identified in 1996 as that of Glyndwr Michael, a Welsh homeless man, and recognised as such by the Commonwealth War Graves Commission.

== Operation Mincemeat ==
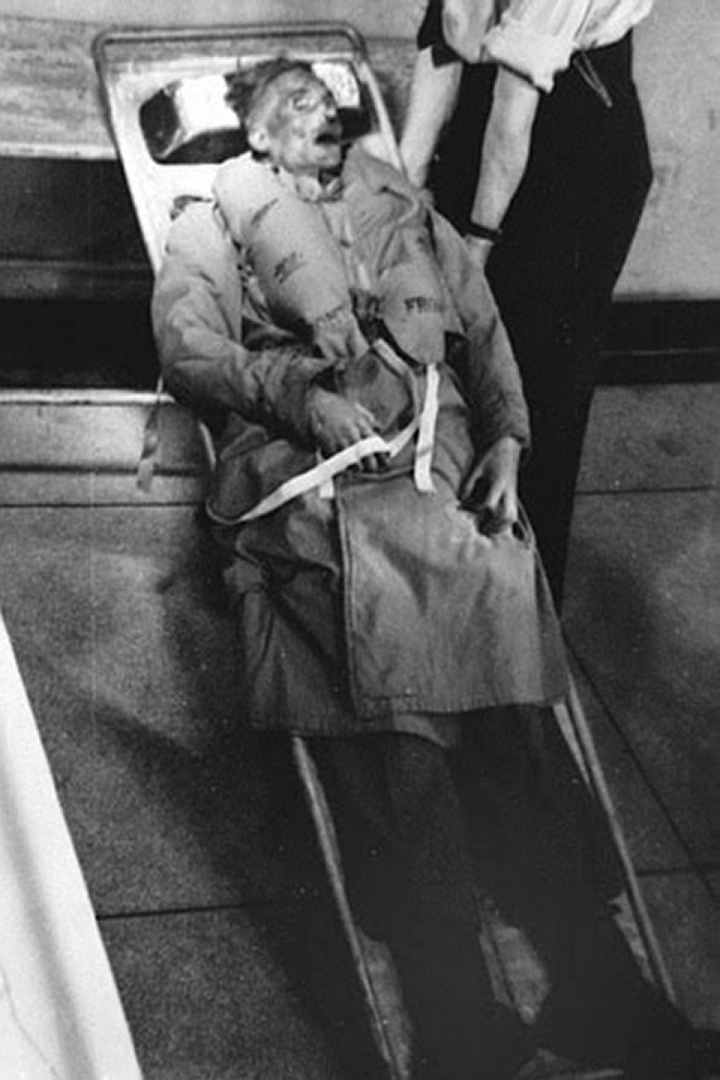
Corpse of "William Martin", prepared for release into the water

The aim of Operation Mincemeat was to allow documents pertaining to Allied operations in the Mediterranean to fall into the hands of German Military Intelligence, to mislead them regarding the target of the intended invasion of southern Europe. In order to convince the Germans of the veracity of the documents, it was decided they would be on the body of a Marine officer, which would also carry documents and personal items attesting to his identity. Finding a usable cadaver had been difficult, as indiscreet inquiries would cause talk, and it was impossible to tell a dead man's next of kin what the body was wanted for. A suitable body was identified, and considerable effort was made to create Martin's persona: identity card and discs, personal letters, a photograph of a fiancée, St. Christopher medal, some bills and theatre tickets.

On 30 April 1943, Lt Norman Jewell, captain of the submarine HMS Seraph, read the 39th Psalm, and "Martin"'s body was gently pushed into the sea where the tide, aided by the push of the submarine's propellers, would bring it ashore off Huelva on the Spanish Atlantic coast.

Attached to Martin's body was a briefcase containing secret documents that had been fabricated by the British Security Service. The purpose was to make German intelligence (which was known to have operatives in Huelva) think he had been a courier delivering documents to a British general. The documents were crafted to deceive the Germans into thinking that the British were preparing to invade Greece and Sardinia, rather than Sicily.

Martin's body was found by a fisherman and, as planned, the documents he was carrying found their way into the hands of German intelligence. The operation was judged a success, as the invasion of Sicily was accomplished more easily and quickly than its planners had expected.

== Identity ==
=== Ewen Montagu's account ===
Ewen Montagu, the officer in charge of Operation Mincemeat, was faced with the task of finding a body to give substance to the persona of William Martin. In this he was assisted by Bentley Purchase, coroner of St Pancras District. Several different accounts of this have been given. In Montagu's book, The Man Who Never Was, written in 1953, he states that in 1942 there was no shortage of bodies, but none they felt they could take. He states that the body of a young man who had died of pneumonia was found, and that permission to use the body was given. Pneumonia was important because it meant the presence of liquid in the lungs which, in the event of autopsy, would appear consistent with death by drowning. The body was released on the condition that the man's real identity would never be revealed.

However, historian Ben Macintyre states that the dead man's parents had died and no known relatives were found. Anna Pukas states that neither of Montagu's claims, that the man died from pneumonia and that the family had been contacted and permission obtained, were true.

=== Glyndwr Michael ===
Glyndwr Michael
- Born: 29 March 1907; Aberbargoed, Monmouthshire, Wales
- Died: 28 January 1943 (aged 36); St Pancras Hospital, London, England
- Resting place: Nuestra Señora de la Soledad Cemetery, Huelva, Spain
- Occupations: Gardener; labourer

Montagu stated that the body was released on the condition that the man's real identity would never be revealed. However, in 1996, Roger Morgan, an amateur historian from London, uncovered evidence in the Public Record Office that the identity of the corpse was a Welshman named Glyndwr Michael.

Michael was born in Aberbargoed in Monmouthshire in South Wales. Before leaving the town, he held part-time jobs as a gardener and labourer. His father Thomas, a coal miner, died by suicide when Michael was 15, and his mother died when he was 31. Homeless, friendless, depressed, and with no money, Michael drifted to London where he lived on the streets.

Michael was found in an abandoned warehouse close to King's Cross, seriously ill from ingesting rat poison that contained phosphorus. Two days later, he died at age 36 in St Pancras Hospital. His death may have been suicide, although he might have simply been hungry, as the poison he ingested was a paste smeared on bread crusts to attract rats.

After being ingested, phosphide reacts with hydrochloric acid in the stomach, generating phosphine, a highly toxic gas. One of the symptoms of phosphine poisoning is pulmonary oedema, an accumulation of large amounts of liquid in the lungs, which would satisfy the need for a body that appeared to have died by drowning. Purchase explained, "This dose was not sufficient to kill him outright, and its only effect was to so impair the functioning of the liver that he died a little time afterwards". When Purchase obtained Michael's body, it was identified as being in suitable condition for a man who would appear to have floated ashore several days after having died at sea by hypothermia and drowning.

=== John Melville ===
After the identification of Michael as Major Martin, doubts began to surface. It seemed odd that an operative as meticulous as Montagu would risk the success of the operation by using a body of a man neither physically fit (as might be expected of a Marine officer) nor having died in the manner suggested (drowned, or as a result of an air crash). Montagu formally states in his book that, in 1942, there was no shortage of bodies, but none they felt they could take. He also states that he feared they might have to steal a body ("do a Burke and Hare"), before the body of a young man who had died of pneumonia, and for whom permission to use the body was given, could be found.

From this Montagu dismissed the need for physical fitness ("he doesn't need to look like an officer – only a staff officer") and the difference in cause of death ("If a post mortem examination was made by someone who had formed the preconceived idea that the death was probably due to drowning there was little likelihood that the difference between this liquid, in lungs that had started to decompose, and sea water would be noticed").

However, in 2004 John and Noreen Steele suggested that Montagu resolved these objections by using the body of a serviceman, and pointed to the accidental loss of HMS Dasher in the River Clyde in March 1943, and the loss of 349 of her crew. They argued that such a person would be of military fitness (which Michael was not) and had died in a marine accident (as Michael had not); also that there would be little difficulty in obtaining identity papers and that the body would be considerably fresher than one that had been on ice for three months.

The submarine designated for the mission was HMS Seraph, which departed from the Clyde on 19 April 1943. Before the mission set off from the Clyde, Montagu described having to drive from London with the body while a Scottish source for the body would have made this task easier.

The Steeles named the person whose body was used as John Melville; in recognition of this, in 2004 a memorial service was held on the present-day Dasher, a patrol craft, at which John Melville's daughter was present. However the Royal Navy later said that there had been a mistake and that the crew had been given wrong information ahead of the service. However, there is some circumstantial evidence that also supports the identity of the body used as being Melville's, attested to as recently as 2022.

Officially, Ordinary Coder John Melville of HMS Dasher, died 27 March 1943, is recorded by the Commonwealth War Graves Commission as buried in Ardrossan Cemetery, Ayrshire, where there is a headstone.

=== Tom Martin ===
Another investigation into the Dasher affair was published in 2003 by Colin Gribbons, drawing similar conclusions to the Steeles'. However, Gribbons identified the body used in Operation Mincemeat as that of yet another person, Tom Martin, a sailor who perished in the Dasher incident. However, the sailor, Able Seaman Thomas Joseph Martin, is recorded by the Commonwealth War Graves Commission as also died on 27 March 1943 and also being buried at Ardrossan Cemetery where a headstone exists.

== Commemoration ==
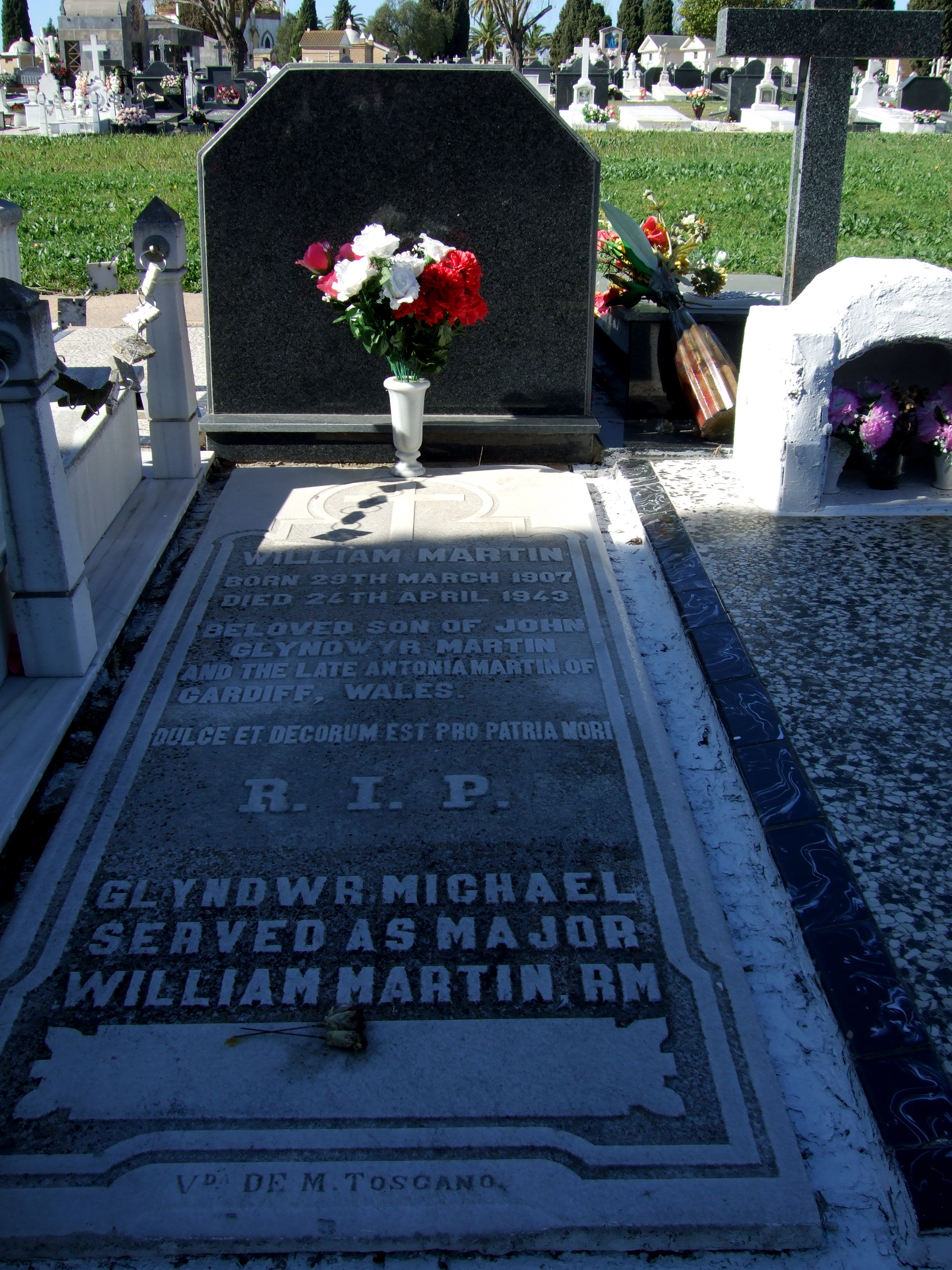
Grave of "William Martin" (now identified as Glyndwr Michael) in Huelva, Spain

The body was buried, with full military honours, as Major William Martin. His grave, No.1886, is in the San Marco section of the Nuestra Señora de la Soledad Cemetery, in Huelva, Spain. The headstone reads:

William Martin, born 29 March 1907, died 24 April 1943, beloved son of John Glyndwyr [sic] Martin and the late Antonia Martin of Cardiff, Wales, Dulce et Decorum est pro Patria Mori, R.I.P.

In 1998, after the British government identified the body as Glyndwr Michael, a new inscription was added to the gravestone:

Glyndwr Michael Served as Major William Martin, RM

A plaque commemorating Glyndwr Michael has been added to the war memorial in Aberbargoed. It is headed Y Dyn Na Fu Erioed ("The Man Who Never Was").

In November 2021 the Jewish American Society for Historic Preservation, UK Branch, working with the Association of Jewish Ex-Servicemen and Women and the London Borough of Hackney, placed a memorial plaque at Hackney Mortuary, where Michael's body was kept prior to Operation Mincemeat, and where it was dressed in a Royal Marines uniform in preparation for Operation Mincemeat. The inscription reads:

Operation Mincemeat

The Hackney Mortuary played an important role in a British military operation during the Second World War (1939–1945), which helped save the lives of thousands of soldiers.

In April 1943 Lieutenant Commander Ewen Montague CBE KC RNVR, a British Jew, and Flight Lieutenant Charles C. Cholmondeley MBE RAF, a British aristocrat, planned Operation Mincemeat to misdirect German forces' attention away from the Allied invasion of Sicily. They brought the donated body of a man to the Hackney Mortuary where it stayed on ice for three months. Cholmondeley and Montague transformed the corpse into a fictitious officer Major William Martin. The body was taken to Scotland and then to a point off southern Spain, where it was placed in the water carrying false letters from senior Allied officers suggesting the Allies would invade Greece, not Sicily. When the body was found, the letters were shared with Nazi intelligence, misdirecting German forces, saving thousands of British and American soldiers' lives during the invasion of Sicily.

"Set a watch before my mouth Lord: and over the door of my lips"

שִׁיתָה יהוה שָׁמְרָה לְפִי נִצְּרָה עַל דַּל שְׂפָתָי (Psalms 141:3)

Hackney Council, Jewish American Society for Historic Preservation, Martin Sugarman (Association of Jewish Ex-Servicemen and Women, Stamford Hill and Hackney Branch)

Glyndwr Michael has been commemorated on stage in Cardboard Citizens' 2009 play Mincemeat and the musical Operation Mincemeat, as well as on film in The Man Who Never Was (1956) and in the 2021 production Operation Mincemeat.
