= Denis Smyth =

Denis Smyth (born 1948) is professor of History at the University of Toronto. His doctorate is from the University of Cambridge. While at Cambridge he studied under F.H. Hinsley, a noted scholar of the Second World War. He is a specialist in modern international relations, particularly the period surrounding World War II and the Spanish Civil War. Among his major works is a monumental collected edition of previously classified British documents from the period just after World War II.

== Publications ==
=== Edited document collections ===
- British Documents on Foreign Affairs, Western Europe: 1940-1945, 8 vols. (1998); and
- British Documents on Foreign Affairs, Europe: 1946-1950, 27 vols. (2000–2003).

=== Scholarly Books ===
- Deathly Deception: The Real Story of Operation Mincemeat Oxford: Oxford University Press, 2010.
- Diplomacy and strategy of survival : British policy and Franco's Spain, 1940-41 Cambridge [Cambridgeshire]; New York : Cambridge University Press, 1986. ISBN 0-521-22819-0
- British documents on foreign affairs—reports and papers from the Foreign Office confidential print. by Paul Preston; Michael Partridge; Denis Smyth [Bethesda, Md.] : University Publications of America, ©2000.
- Spain, the EEC, and NATO by Paul Preston; Denis Smyth; Boston : Routledge & K. Paul [for] the Royal Institute of International Affairs, 1984. ISBN 0-7100-9559-7
  - Translated into Spanish as España ante la CEE y la OTAN by Paul Preston; Denis Smyth Barcelona : Grijalbo, 1985.

=== Book chapters ===
- "Battleground of reputations : Ireland and the Spanish Civil War" in The Republic Besieged: Civil War in Spain 1936-1939 ed. by Paul Preston & Ann L Mackenzie. Edinburgh University Press, 1996. ISBN 0-585-08688-5
- "Reflex reaction : Germany and the onset of the Spanish Civil War" in Revolution and war in Spain, 1931-1939 ed. by Paul Preston New York : Methuen, 1984. ISBN 0-416-34960-9
- "Politics of asylum, Juan Negrin and the British government in 1940" in Diplomacy and intelligence during the Second World War ed. by F H Hinsley; Richard Langhorne. Cambridge University Press, 1985. ISBN 0-521-26840-0

=== Articles ===
- "The Dispatch of the Spanish Blue Division to the Russian Front: Reasons and Repercussions" European History Quarterly 1994 24(4): 537-553
- "Franco Cunctator" International History Review 1996 18(3): 629-64
- "Our Man in Havana, Their Man in Madrid: Literary Invention in Espionage Fact and Fiction" Intelligence and National Security 1990 5(4): 117-135
- "Screen Torch: Allied Counter-Intelligencve and Spanish Threat to the Secrecy of the Allied Invasion of French North Africa in November, 1942." Intelligence and National Security 1989 4(2): 335-356.
- "Franco and World War II History Today 1985 35(Nov): 10-15
- "Duce Diplomatico [Diplomatic leader]". Historical Journal 1978 21(4): 981-1000
