= 78th Tony Awards =

2025 US theatrical awards ceremony

- Date: June 8, 2025
- Venue: Radio City Music Hall
- Hosted by: Cynthia Erivo

Highlights
- Most wins: Maybe Happy Ending (6)
- Most nominations: Buena Vista Social Club, Death Becomes Her, and Maybe Happy Ending (10)
- Website: tonyawards.com

Television/radio coverage
- Network: CBS; Paramount+ Pluto TV
- Viewership: 4.9 million (CBS)
- Produced by: Ricky Kirshner; Glenn Weiss
- Directed by: Glenn Weiss

The 78th Tony Awards were held on June 8, 2025, to recognize excellence in Broadway productions during the 2024–25 season. The ceremony took place at Radio City Music Hall in New York City, and was broadcast on CBS, with streaming available on Paramount+ and Pluto TV. The show was hosted by Cynthia Erivo.

The musicals Death Becomes Her, Buena Vista Social Club, and Maybe Happy Ending led the field with ten nominations each. Maybe Happy Ending emerged as the night's most-awarded production, winning six Tony Awards including Best Musical and Best Actor in a Musical for Darren Criss. Branden Jacobs-Jenkins’ play Purpose won Best Play.

Other top acting honors went to Nicole Scherzinger (Best Actress in a Musical), Cole Escola (Best Actor in a Play), and Sarah Snook (Best Actress in a Play).

== Ceremony information ==
Pluto TV streamed the pre-ceremony broadcast The Tony Awards: Act One, hosted by Darren Criss and Renée Elise Goldsberry. Brian Stokes Mitchell served as the announcer.

Cynthia Erivo served as host. Following the ceremony, NPR praised her comedy, the Associated Press described her as an "amiable host", and Deadline called her "absolutely flawless". Vulture praised her opening number, noting she had "a really smart strategy...: joking to a minimum (not her strong suit), vocals on max (there’s no one better)".

The ceremony opened with a brief sketch of Erivo walking from her dressing room to the stage, while various people advise her on what she should do for the opening number, before Oprah Winfrey advises her to be herself. Upon reaching the stage, Erivo sang "Sometimes All You Need Is a Song", an original piece written by Marc Shaiman, Scott Wittman, Benj Pasek and Justin Paul which referenced various nominees. She was joined by the Broadway Inspirational Voices choir partway through the number.

Erivo and Sara Bareilles performed a duet of "Tomorrow" for the In Memoriam section of the ceremony. The original cast of Hamilton also performed a medley of eight songs from the show in honor of the musical's 10th anniversary, choosing to wear all-black rather than their original costumes. The closing number was an adapted version of "And I Am Telling You I'm Not Going," with lyrics changed to reference events of the night.

== Eligibility ==
The Tony Awards eligibility dates for the 2024–2025 Broadway season were April 29, 2024, through April 27, 2025. Productions were also required to meet all other eligibility criteria as set forth by the American Theatre Wing and the Broadway League. There are 41 legitimate Broadway-eligible theaters in which a production must be performed in to attain eligibility for award consideration. Nominations for the 2025 Tony Awards were announced on May 1, 2025.

Original plays

- All In: Comedy About Love
- Cult of Love
- English
- Good Night, and Good Luck
- The Hills of California
- Job
- John Proctor Is the Villain
- Left on Tenth
- McNeal
- Oh, Mary!
- The Picture of Dorian Gray
- Purpose
- The Roommate
- Stranger Things: The First Shadow

Original musicals

- A Wonderful World
- Boop! The Musical
- Buena Vista Social Club
- Dead Outlaw
- Death Becomes Her
- Just in Time
- Maybe Happy Ending
- Operation Mincemeat
- Real Women Have Curves
- Redwood
- Smash
- Stephen Sondheim's Old Friends
- Swept Away
- Tammy Faye

Play revivals

- Eureka Day
- Glengarry Glen Ross
- Home
- Othello
- Thornton Wilder's Our Town
- Romeo + Juliet
- Yellow Face

Musical revivals

- Elf
- Floyd Collins
- Gypsy
- The Last Five Years
- Once Upon a Mattress
- Pirates! The Penzance Musical
- Sunset Boulevard

== Winners and nominees ==
The nominees for the 78th Tony Awards were announced on May 1, 2025, at 8:30am EDT by Wendell Pierce and Sarah Paulson. The winners were announced on June 8, 2025. The ceremony was hosted by Cynthia Erivo. The awards were largely spread out across various shows, with no one show "sweeping" the awards. Vulture criticized the choice to exclude some awards from the main ceremony, including Best Book, Best Score and Harvey Fierstein's acceptance of the Lifetime Achievement Award.

Purpose, written by Branden Jacobs-Jenkins, won Best Play. Jacobs-Jenkins had received Best Revival of a Play for his play Appropriate at the 77th Tony Awards. Maybe Happy Ending received six awards including Best Musical, while its director Michael Arden won Best Direction of a Musical and Darren Criss won Best Actor in a Musical for his role as Oliver, the first Asian-American man to do so. Andrew Lloyd Webber's Sunset Boulevard won Best Revival of a Musical with Nicole Scherzinger winning Leading Actress in a Musical, the second Asian-American woman to do so. Paul Tazewell won Best Costume Design in a Musical for his work in Death Becomes Her. Actors who won on their Broadway debut included Sarah Snook who won Best Actress in a Play for her 26 roles in The Picture of Dorian Gray, most notably Dorian Gray, and Jak Malone, who won Best Featured Actor in a Musical for his role in Operation Mincemeat as Hester Leggatt.

Other winners included Cole Escola who won Best Actor in a Play for their role in Oh, Mary! as Mary Todd Lincoln and Kara Young who won Best Featured Actress in a Play for her role in Purpose as Aziza Houston. Escola was the first non-binary actor to win the category, while Young became the first Black actor to win a Tony Award in two consecutive years. Francis Jue won Best Performance by a Featured Actor in a Play for his role in Yellow Face, and said in his acceptance speech that 20 years prior, "he was gifted his tuxedo from another Asian actor who wanted him to wear it to the Tonys". Jue was the second Asian-American man to win the category, the first being B.D. Wong for M. Butterfly in 1988.

In an upset to some critics, the revival of Gypsy, headed by Audra McDonald, who is the most awarded performer in Tony history, did not win a single award. Additionally, Death Becomes Her, which tied for most nominated with ten nominations, won only a single award for costuming.

=== Awards ===
Best Play ‡	Best Musical ‡
Purpose; English; The Hills of California; John Proctor Is the Villain; Oh, Mary!	Maybe Happy Ending; Buena Vista Social Club; Dead Outlaw; Death Becomes Her; Operation Mincemeat
Best Revival of a Play ‡	Best Revival of a Musical ‡
Eureka Day; Thornton Wilder's Our Town; Romeo + Juliet; Yellow Face	Sunset Boulevard; Floyd Collins; Gypsy; Pirates! The Penzance Musical
Best Performance by a Leading Actor in a Play	Best Performance by a Leading Actress in a Play
Cole Escola – Oh, Mary! as Mary Todd Lincoln; George Clooney – Good Night, and Good Luck as Edward R. Murrow; Jon Michael Hill – Purpose as Nazareth "Naz" Jasper; Daniel Dae Kim – Yellow Face as DHH; Harry Lennix – Purpose as Solomon "Sonny" Jasper; Louis McCartney – Stranger Things: The First Shadow as Henry Creel	Sarah Snook – The Picture of Dorian Gray as Dorian Gray, et al.; Laura Donnelly – The Hills of California as Veronica / Joan; Mia Farrow – The Roommate as Sharon; LaTanya Richardson Jackson – Purpose as Claudine Jasper; Sadie Sink – John Proctor Is the Villain as Shelby Holcomb
Best Performance by a Leading Actor in a Musical	Best Performance by a Leading Actress in a Musical
Darren Criss – Maybe Happy Ending as Oliver; Andrew Durand – Dead Outlaw as Elmer McCurdy; Tom Francis – Sunset Boulevard as Joe Gillis; Jonathan Groff – Just in Time as Bobby Darin; James Monroe Iglehart – A Wonderful World as Louis Armstrong; Jeremy Jordan – Floyd Collins as Floyd Collins	Nicole Scherzinger – Sunset Boulevard as Norma Desmond; Megan Hilty – Death Becomes Her as Madeline Ashton; Audra McDonald – Gypsy as Rose; Jasmine Amy Rogers – Boop! The Musical as Betty Boop; Jennifer Simard – Death Becomes Her as Helen Sharp
Best Performance by a Featured Actor in a Play	Best Performance by a Featured Actress in a Play
Francis Jue – Yellow Face as HYH, et al.; Glenn Davis – Purpose as Solomon "Junior" Jasper; Gabriel Ebert – John Proctor Is the Villain as Mr. Carter Smith; Bob Odenkirk – Glengarry Glen Ross as Shelly Levene; Conrad Ricamora – Oh, Mary! as Mary's Husband	Kara Young – Purpose as Aziza Houston; Tala Ashe – English as Elham; Jessica Hecht – Eureka Day as Suzanne; Marjan Neshat – English as Marjan; Fina Strazza – John Proctor Is the Villain as Beth Powell
Best Performance by a Featured Actor in a Musical	Best Performance by a Featured Actress in a Musical
Jak Malone – Operation Mincemeat as Hester Leggatt and others; Brooks Ashmanskas – Smash as Nigel Davies; Jeb Brown – Dead Outlaw as Bandleader / Walter Jarrett; Danny Burstein – Gypsy as Herbie; Taylor Trensch – Floyd Collins as Skeets Miller	Natalie Venetia Belcon – Buena Vista Social Club as Omara Portuondo (adult); Julia Knitel – Dead Outlaw as Helen McCurdy / Maggie Johnson / Millicent Esper; Gracie Lawrence – Just in Time as Connie Francis; Justina Machado – Real Women Have Curves as Carmen Garcia; Joy Woods – Gypsy as Louise
Best Direction of a Play	Best Direction of a Musical
Sam Pinkleton – Oh, Mary!; Knud Adams – English; Sam Mendes – The Hills of California; Danya Taymor – John Proctor Is the Villain; Kip Williams – The Picture of Dorian Gray	Michael Arden – Maybe Happy Ending; Saheem Ali – Buena Vista Social Club; David Cromer – Dead Outlaw; Christopher Gattelli – Death Becomes Her; Jamie Lloyd – Sunset Boulevard
Best Book of a Musical	Best Original Score (Music and/or Lyrics) Written for the Theatre
Will Aronson and Hue Park – Maybe Happy Ending; David Cumming, Felix Hagan, Natasha Hodgson and Zoë Roberts – Operation Mincemeat; Itamar Moses – Dead Outlaw; Marco Pennette – Death Becomes Her; Marco Ramirez – Buena Vista Social Club	Maybe Happy Ending – Will Aronson (music and lyrics) and Hue Park (lyrics); Dead Outlaw – Erik Della Penna and David Yazbek (music and lyrics); Death Becomes Her – Noel Carey and Julia Mattison (music and lyrics); Operation Mincemeat – David Cumming, Felix Hagan, Natasha Hodgson and Zoë Roberts (music and lyrics); Real Women Have Curves – Joy Huerta and Benjamin Velez (music and lyrics)
Best Scenic Design of a Play	Best Scenic Design of a Musical
Miriam Buether and 59 Productions – Stranger Things: The First Shadow; David Bergman and Marg Horwell – The Picture of Dorian Gray; Marsha Ginsberg – English; Rob Howell – The Hills of California; Scott Pask – Good Night, and Good Luck	Dane Laffrey and George Reeve – Maybe Happy Ending; Rachel Hauck – Swept Away; Arnulfo Maldonado – Buena Vista Social Club; Derek McLane – Death Becomes Her; Derek McLane – Just in Time
Best Costume Design of a Play	Best Costume Design of a Musical
Marg Horwell – The Picture of Dorian Gray; Brenda Abbandandolo – Good Night, and Good Luck; Rob Howell – The Hills of California; Holly Pierson – Oh, Mary!; Brigitte Reiffenstuel – Stranger Things: The First Shadow	Paul Tazewell – Death Becomes Her; Dede Ayite – Buena Vista Social Club; Gregg Barnes – Boop! The Musical; Clint Ramos – Maybe Happy Ending; Catherine Zuber – Just in Time
Best Lighting Design of a Play	Best Lighting Design of a Musical
Jon Clark – Stranger Things: The First Shadow; David Bengali and Heather Gilbert – Good Night, and Good Luck; Natasha Chivers – The Hills of California; Natasha Katz and Hannah Wasileski – John Proctor Is the Villain; Nick Schlieper – The Picture of Dorian Gray	Jack Knowles – Sunset Boulevard; Tyler Micoleau – Buena Vista Social Club; Ben Stanton – Maybe Happy Ending; Ruey Horng Sun and Scott Zielinski – Floyd Collins; Justin Townsend – Death Becomes Her
Best Sound Design of a Play	Best Sound Design of a Musical
Paul Arditti – Stranger Things: The First Shadow; Palmer Hefferan – John Proctor Is the Villain; Daniel Kluger – Good Night, and Good Luck; Nick Powell – The Hills of California; Clemence Williams – The Picture of Dorian Gray	Jonathan Deans – Buena Vista Social Club; Adam Fisher – Sunset Boulevard; Peter Hylenski – Just in Time; Peter Hylenski – Maybe Happy Ending; Dan Moses Schreier – Floyd Collins
Best Choreography	Best Orchestrations
Patricia Delgado and Justin Peck – Buena Vista Social Club; Joshua Bergasse – Smash; Camille A. Brown – Gypsy; Christopher Gattelli – Death Becomes Her; Jerry Mitchell – Boop! The Musical	Marco Paguia – Buena Vista Social Club; Will Aronson – Maybe Happy Ending; Bruce Coughlin – Floyd Collins; David Cullen and Andrew Lloyd Webber – Sunset Boulevard; Andrew Resnick and Michael Thurber – Just in Time

‡ The award is presented to the producer(s) of the musical or play.

=== Non-competitive awards ===
Those being recognized with non-competitive awards are below.

Accolade	Names
Lifetime Achievement in the Theatre	Harvey Fierstein
Isabelle Stevenson Award	Celia Keenan-Bolger
Special Tony Award	"The musicians who make up the band of Buena Vista Social Club (Note: Marco Paguia (music director, conductor/piano); David Oquendo (associate music director, guitar); Renesito Avich (tres); Gustavo Schartz (bass); Javier Días, Román Diaz, Mauricio Herrera (percussion); Jesus Ricardo (trumpet); Eddie Venegas (trombone); Hery Paz (woodwinds); and Leonardo Reyna (piano)")
Special Tony Award	"The illusions and technical effects of Stranger Things: The First Shadow (Note: Jamie Harrison, Chris Fisher, Gary Beestone, and Edward Pierce")
Tony Honors for Excellence in Theatre	Great Performances
Tony Honors for Excellence in Theatre	New 42
Tony Honors for Excellence in Theatre	New York Public Library for the Performing Arts
Tony Honors for Excellence in Theatre	Michael P. Price
Regional Theatre Tony Award	The Muny
Excellence in Theatre Education Award	Gary Edwin Robinson from Boys and Girls High School

== Multiple nominations and awards ==
=== Productions with multiple nominations and awards ===
Nominations	Awards	Production
10	4	Buena Vista Social Club
10	1	Death Becomes Her
10	6	Maybe Happy Ending
7	0	Dead Outlaw
7	0	The Hills of California
7	0	John Proctor Is the Villain
7	3	Sunset Boulevard
6	0	Floyd Collins
6	0	Just in Time
6	2	The Picture of Dorian Gray
6	2	Purpose
5	0	English
5	0	Good Night, and Good Luck
5	0	Gypsy
5	2	Oh, Mary!
5	3	Stranger Things: The First Shadow
4	1	Operation Mincemeat
3	0	Boop! The Musical
3	1	Yellow Face
2	1	Eureka Day
2	0	Real Women Have Curves
2	0	Smash

=== Individuals with multiple nominations and awards ===
Nominations	Awards	Individual
3	2	Will Aronson
2	0	David Cumming
2	1	Cole Escola
2	0	Christopher Gattelli
2	0	Felix Hagan
2	0	Natasha Hodgson
2	1	Marg Horwell
2	0	Rob Howell
2	0	Peter Hylenski
2	0	Derek McLane
2	2	Hue Park
2	0	Zoë Roberts

== Presenters and performers ==
Presenters

Presenters
Names	Notes
Keanu Reeves and Alex Winter	presented Best Actress in a Play
Michelle Williams	introduced Death Becomes Her
Danielle Brooks and Katie Holmes	presented Best Featured Actor in a Play
Julianne Hough	introduced Buena Vista Social Club
Charli D'Amelio and Adam Lambert	presented Best Featured Actor in a Musical
Cynthia Erivo (host)	introduced Just in Time
Carrie Preston and Tom Felton	presented Best Featured Actress in a Play
Glenn Close	introduced Sunset Boulevard
Kristin Chenoweth and Rachel Bay Jones	presented Best Featured Actress in a Musical
Kelli O'Hara	introduced Pirates! The Penzance Musical
Ben Stiller	introduced nominees and presented Best Play
Lea Salonga	introduced Maybe Happy Ending
Jesse Eisenberg	introduced Floyd Collins
Samuel L. Jackson and LaTanya Richardson Jackson	presented Best Revival of a Play
Cynthia Erivo (host)	introduced the original cast of Hamilton
Bryan Cranston and Allison Janney	presented Best Director of a Play and Best Director of a Musical
Jean Smart and Sarah Paulson	presented Best Actor in a Play
Renée Elise Goldsberry	introduced Dead Outlaw
Lea Michele and Aaron Tveit	presented Best Revival of a Musical
Cecily Strong	introduced Operation Mincemeat: A New Musical
Auliʻi Cravalho	introduced Real Women Have Curves
Ariana DeBose	presented Best Actor in a Musical
Oprah Winfrey	presented Best Actress in a Musical
Lin-Manuel Miranda	presented Best Musical

Performances

The ceremony featured performances from 11 nominated musicals, along with four additional performances.

Performers
Names	Song(s)
Cynthia Erivo and Broadway Inspirational Voices	"Sometimes All You Need Is a Song"
Megan Hilty from Death Becomes Her	"For the Gaze"
The ensemble of Buena Vista Social Club	"Candela"
Jonathan Groff from Just in Time	"Mack the Knife" / "That's All" / "Once in a Lifetime"
Nicole Scherzinger from Sunset Boulevard	"As If We Never Said Goodbye"
The ensemble of Pirates! The Penzance Musical	"The Sail the Ocean Blues"
Darren Criss and Helen J. Shen from Maybe Happy Ending	"Chasing Fireflies" / "Never Fly Away"
The ensemble of Floyd Collins	"The Ballad of Floyd Collins" / "The Call"
Lin-Manuel Miranda, Leslie Odom Jr., Phillipa Soo; Renée Elise Goldsberry, Daveed Diggs, Christopher Jackson, Jasmine Cephas Jones, Anthony Ramos, Jonathan Groff, Ariana DeBose, and the original ensemble of Hamilton	"Non-Stop" / "My Shot" / "The Schuyler Sisters" / "Guns and Ships" / "You'll Be Back" / "Yorktown (The World Turned Upside Down)" / "The Room Where It Happens" / "History Has Its Eyes on You"
Sara Bareilles and Cynthia Erivo ("In Memoriam" segment)	"Tomorrow"
The ensemble of Dead Outlaw	"Ballad" / "Dead"
Audra McDonald from Gypsy	"Rose's Turn"
The ensemble of Operation Mincemeat: A New Musical	"Born to Lead"
The ensemble of Real Women Have Curves	"Jugglin'"
Cynthia Erivo	"And I Am Telling You I'm Not Going"

== Reception ==
=== Ratings ===
The ceremony drew an average of 4.85 million viewers on CBS, making it the most-viewed Tonys ceremony since the 73rd Tony Awards in 2019. Figures from Paramount+, which was up 208%, brought total viewership up to 5.1 million. This follows the news that the 2024-25 season was the highest grossing season ever for Broadway.

=== Critical reception ===
The New York Times wrote that the ceremonies' highlights were the Hamilton 10-year anniversary performance, Cynthia Erivo's hosting abilities, and the performances of Nicole Scherzinger and Jonathan Groff. Erivo received widespread acclaim for her hosting abilities with Deadline Hollywood declaring, "[She] did an absolutely flawless job as host...This is what an awards show should look like". Entertainment Weekly cited her as one of the show's highlights saying, "From the opening seconds, Erivo defied expectations" adding, "Throughout the ceremony, she played to her strengths and it made for a superb outing as a host."

== In Memoriam ==
Host Cynthia Erivo along with Sara Bareilles performed the song Tomorrow from the musical Annie during the In Memoriam segment, As the names and images of theater personalities who died in the past year were shown in the following order.

- Charles Strouse
- Ken Page
- Tony Mordente
- Lynn Taylor-Corbett
- Jim Barry
- Richard Chamberlain
- George Wendt
- Tony Lo Bianco
- Claire Van Kampen
- Nagle Jackson
- Steven Ehrenberg
- Hellen Gallagher
- Adrian Bailey
- Whitney Blausen
- Stephen Mo Hanan
- Martin Starger
- Sande Cambell
- Frank Hartenstein
- Charles Gray
- Mimi Hines
- David Edward Byrd
- Joseph Hardy
- Micheal McDonald
- Marshall Brickman
- Athol Fugard
- Sandy Robertson
- Judith Jamison
- Martin Benson
- Adam Epstein
- Joan Plowright
- William Finn
- Linda Lavin
- Arthur Faria
- Priscilla Pointer
- Clive Revill
- Kathryn Crosby
- Jules Feiffer
- Jean Marsh
- Mel Shapiro
- Maggie Smith
- Quincy Jones
- Tony Roberts
- James Earl Jones
- Gavin Creel

== See also ==
- 2025 Laurence Olivier Awards
- Drama Desk Awards
- Outer Critics Circle Awards
- New York Drama Critics' Circle
- Theatre World Award
- Lucille Lortel Awards
- Obie Award
- Drama League Award
- Chita Rivera Awards for Dance and Choreography
