= Drama Desk Award for Outstanding Book of a Musical =

American theatre award

- Awarded for: Outstanding Book of a Musical
- Location: New York City
- Country: United States
- Presented by: Drama Desk
- First award: 1969
- Currently held by: Brian Quijada and Nygel D. Robinson, Mexodus (2026)
- Website: dramadesk.org (defunct)

The Drama Desk Award for Outstanding Book of a Musical is an annual award presented by Drama Desk in recognition of achievements in theatre across collective Broadway, off-Broadway and off-off-Broadway productions in New York City. It was first presented at the 1969 ceremony, under the shorter name Drama Desk Award for Outstanding Book, changing to its current name as of the 1988 ceremony.

For two years, in addition to the award for Outstanding Book, an award was presented to the writers of the Drama Desk Award for Most Promising Book. In 1972, that award went to Melvin Van Peebles for Ain't Supposed to Die a Natural Death, while the 1973 award went to Ron House and Diz White for El Grande de Coco-Cola.

== Winners and nominees ==
Key

and bold indicates the winner.

=== 1960s ===
Year	Writer	Production	Ref.
1969
1969	**Peter Stone**	**1776**	

=== 1970s ===
Year	Writer	Production	Ref.
1970
1970	**George Furth**	**Company**	
1971
1971	**Burt Shevelove**	**No, No, Nanette**	
1972
1972	**John Guare and Mel Shapiro**	**Two Gentlemen of Verona**	
1973
1973	**Hugh Wheeler**	**A Little Night Music**	
1974
1974	**Hugh Wheeler**	**Candide**	
1975	—N/a		
1976
1976	**James Kirkwood Jr. and Nicholas Dante**	**A Chorus Line**	
1976	Alfred Uhry	The Robber Bridegroom	
1976	John Weidman	Pacific Overtures	
1977
1977	**Thomas Meehan**	**Annie**	
1978	—N/a		
1979
1979	**Hugh Wheeler**	**Sweeney Todd: The Demon Barber of Fleet Street**	

=== 1980s ===
Year	Writer	Production	Ref.
1980–1983	—N/a		
1984
1984	**James Lapine**	**Sunday in the Park with George**	
1984	Harvey Fierstein	La Cage aux Folles	
1984	Garry Trudeau	Doonesbury	
1985
1985	**Jerry Colker**	**Three Guys Naked from the Waist Down**	
1986
1986	**Rupert Holmes**	**The Mystery of Edwin Drood**	
1986	Marta Kauffman, Seth Friedman and David Crane	Personals	
1986	Warren Leight	Mayor	
1987
1987	**L. Arthur Rose, Douglas Furber, Stephen Fry and Mike Ockrent**	**Me and My Girl**	
1987	Barry Harman	Olympus on My Mind	
1988
1988	**James Lapine**	**Into the Woods**	
1989	—N/a		

=== 1990s ===
Year	Writer	Production	Ref.
1990
1990	**Larry Gelbart**	**City of Angels**	
1991
1991	**Marsha Norman**	**The Secret Garden**	
1991	John Weidman	Assassins	
1992
1992	**George C. Wolfe**	**Jelly's Last Jam**	
1993	—N/a		
1994
1994	**James Lapine**	**Passion**	
1994	Michael John LaChiusa	Hello Again	
1995	—N/a		
1996
1996	**Jonathan Larson**	**Rent**	
1996	Graciela Daniele and Jim Lewis	Chronicle of a Death Foretold	
1996	Laurence Klavan	Bed and Sofa	
1996	Tina Landau	Floyd Collins	
1996	John Weidman	Big: the musical	
1997	—N/a		
1998
1998	**Terrence McNally**	**Ragtime**	
1999
1999	**Alfred Uhry**	**Parade**	
1999	William Finn and James Lapine	A New Brain	

=== 2000s ===
Year	Writer	Production	Ref.
2000	—N/a		
2001
2001	**Mel Brooks and Thomas Meehan**	**The Producers**	
2001	Kirsten Childs	The Bubbly Black Girl Sheds Her Chameleon Skin	
2001	Keythe Farley and Brian Flemming	Bat Boy: The Musical	
2001	Greg Kotis	Urinetown	
2001	Terrence McNally	The Full Monty	
2002
2002	**John Lahr and Elaine Stritch**	**Elaine Stritch at Liberty**	
2002	John Guare	Sweet Smell of Success	
2002	Jonathan Larson and David Auburn	Tick, Tick... BOOM!	
2002	Richard Morris and Dick Scanlan	Thoroughly Modern Millie	
2003
2003	**Mark O'Donnell and Thomas Meehan**	**Hairspray**	
2003	Tim Acito and Alexander Dinelaris	Zanna, Don't!	
2003	Terrence McNally	A Man of No Importance	
2003	Jeremy Sams and Didier Van Cauwelaert	Amour	
2003	Jeff Whitty	Avenue Q	
2004
2004	**Winnie Holzman**	**Wicked**	
2004	Tony Kushner	Caroline, or Change	
2005
2005	**Rachel Sheinkin**	**The 25th Annual Putnam County Spelling Bee**	
2005	Nell Benjamin and Laurence O'Keefe	Cam Jansen	
2005	Kevin Del Aguila	Altar Boyz	
2005	Mark Harelik	The Immigrant	
2005	Eric Idle	Monty Python's Spamalot	
2005	Jeffrey Lane	Dirty Rotten Scoundrels	
2006
2006	**Bob Martin and Don McKellar**	**The Drowsy Chaperone**	
2006	Rick Elice and Marshall Brickman	Jersey Boys	
2006	Doug Wright	Grey Gardens	
2007
2007	**Rupert Holmes and Peter Stone**	**Curtains**	
2007	Scott Brown and Anthony King	Gutenberg! The Musical!	
2007	Julian Fellowes	Mary Poppins	
2007	Heather Hach	Legally Blonde	
2007	Steven Sater	Spring Awakening	
2007	Alfred Uhry	LoveMusik	
2008
2008	**Douglas Carter Beane**	**Xanadu**	
2008	Harvey Fierstein	A Catered Affair	
2008	Ben Katchor	The Slug Bearers of Kayrol Island	
2008	Jason Loewith and Joshua Schmidt	Adding Machine	
2008	Stew	Passing Strange	
2008	Eric H. Weinberger	Wanda's World	
2009
2009	**Lee Hall**	**Billy Elliot the Musical**	
2009	Steven Cosson and Jim Lewis	This Beautiful City	
2009	Joe DiPietro	The Toxic Avenger	
2009	Brian Hill	The Story of My Life	
2009	David Lindsay-Abaire	Shrek the Musical	
2009	Patricia Resnick	9 to 5	

=== 2010s ===
Year	Writer	Production	Ref.
2010
2010	**Alex Timbers**	**Bloody Bloody Andrew Jackson**	
2010	Joe DiPietro	Memphis	
2010	Joe Iconis	Bloodsong of Love	
2010	Dick Scanlan and Sherie Rene Scott	Everyday Rapture	
2010	David Thompson	The Scottsboro Boys	
2010	David Zellnik	Yank!	
2011
2011	**Adam Mathias**	**See Rock City and Other Destinations**	
2011	Kristen Anderson-Lopez, James-Allen Ford, Russ Kaplan and Sara Wordsworth	In Transit	
2011	Iris Rainer Dart	The People in the Picture	
2011	Stephan Elliott and Allan Scott	Priscilla, Queen of the Desert	
2011	Trey Parker, Robert Lopez and Matt Stone	The Book of Mormon	
2011	Michael Zam	The Kid	
2012
2012	**Joe DiPietro**	**Nice Work If You Can Get It**	
2012	Douglas Carter Beane	Lysistrata Jones	
2012	Janus Cercone and Warren Leight	Leap of Faith	
2012	Joy Gregory	The Shaggs: Philosophy of the World	
2012	Michael John LaChiusa	Queen of the Mist	
2012	Thomas Meehan and Peter Stone	Death Takes a Holiday	
2013
2013	**Dennis Kelly**	**Matilda the Musical**	
2013	Sybille Pearson	Giant	
2013	Joseph Robinette	A Christmas Story: The Musical	
2013	David Rossmer and Steve Rosen	The Other Josh Cohen	
2013	Jeff Whitty	Bring It On: The Musical	
2013	Doug Wright	Hands on a Hardbody	
2014
2014	**Robert L. Freedman**	**A Gentleman's Guide to Love and Murder**	
2014	Chad Beguelin	Aladdin	
2014	Joe Kinosian and Kellen Blair	Murder for Two	
2014	Lisa Kron	Fun Home	
2014	Douglas McGrath	Beautiful: The Carole King Musical	
2014	Marsha Norman	The Bridges of Madison County	
2015
2015	**Lin-Manuel Miranda**	**Hamilton**	
2015	Hunter Bell and Lee Overtree	Found	
2015	Karey Kirkpatrick and John O’Farrell	Something Rotten!	
2015	Craig Lucas	An American in Paris	
2015	Terrence McNally	The Visit	
2015	Kim Rosenstock, Will Connolly, and Michael Mitnick	Fly by Night	
2016
2016	**John Caird**	**Daddy Long Legs**	
2016	Michael John LaChiusa	First Daughter Suite	
2016	Jessie Nelson	Waitress	
2017
2017	**Irene Sankoff and David Hein**	**Come from Away**	
2017	Terrence McNally	Anastasia	
2017	Itamar Moses	The Band's Visit	
2017	Richard Oberacker and Rob Taylor	Bandstand	
2017	Joe Tracz	The Lightning Thief: The Percy Jackson Musical	
2018
2018	**Tina Fey**	**Mean Girls**	
2018	Kyle Jarrow	SpongeBob SquarePants	
2018	Peter Kellogg	Desperate Measures	
2018	Hannah Moscovitch	Old Stock: A Refugee Love Story	
2019
2019	**Robert Horn**	**Tootsie**	
2019	Scott Brown and Anthony King	Beetlejuice	
2019	Andrew R. Butler	Rags Parkland Sings the Songs of the Future	
2019	Bob Martin and Chad Beguelin	The Prom	
2019	Dominique Morisseau	Ain't Too Proud	

=== 2020s ===
Year	Writer	Production	Ref.
2020
2020	**Michael R. Jackson**	**A Strange Loop**	
2020	David Henry Hwang	Soft Power	
2020	Dave Malloy	Octet	
2020	Lynn Nottage	The Secret Life of Bees	
2020	Mark Saltzman	Romeo & Bernadette	
2020	Dick Scanlan	The Unsinkable Molly Brown	
2021	No awards: New York theatres shuttered, March 2020 to September 2021, due to the COVID-19 pandemic in New York City		
2022
2022	**Bruce Sussman**	**Harmony: A New Musical**	
2022	Billy Crystal, Lowell Ganz and Babaloo Mandel	Mr. Saturday Night	
2022	Toby Marlow and Lucy Moss	Six	
2022	Lynn Nottage	Intimate Apparel	
2023
2023	**Matthew López and Amber Ruffin**	**Some Like It Hot**	
2023	Jonathan Hogue	Stranger Sings! The Parody Musical	
2023	Robert Horn	Shucked	
2023	Marla Mindelle, Constantine Rousouli, and Tye Blue	Titanique	
2023	David West Read	& Juliet	
2024	**Itamar Moses**	**Dead Outlaw**	
2024	Justin Huertas	Lizard Boy: The Musical	
2024	Michael R. Jackson and Anna K. Jacobs	Teeth	
2024	Michael John LaChiusa	The Gardens of Anuncia	
2024	Rebekah Green Melocik	How to Dance in Ohio	
2025
2025	**Will Aronson and Hue Park**	**Maybe Happy Ending**	
2025	David Cumming, Felix Hagan, Natasha Hodgson, and Zoë Roberts	Operation Mincemeat	
2025	Warren Leight and Isaac Oliver	Just in Time	
2025	Bob Martin	Boop! The Musical	
2025	Marla Mindelle and Jonathan Parks-Ramage	The Big Gay Jamboree	
2025	Marco Pennette	Death Becomes Her	
2026
2026	**Brian Quijada and Nygel D. Robinson**	**Mexodus**	
2026	Ethan Lipton	The Seat of Our Pants	
2026	Douglas Lyons	Beau the Musical	
2026	Jesse Malin and Lauren Ludwig	Silver Manhattan	
2026	Dahlak Brathwaite	Try/Step/Trip	

== Multiple wins ==
3 wins

- James Lapine
- Thomas Meehan
- Hugh Wheeler

2 wins

- Rupert Holmes

== Multiple nominations ==
5 nominations

- Terrence McNally

4 nominations

- James Lapine
- Thomas Meehan

3 nominations

- Joe DiPietro
- Michael John LaChiusa
- Warren Leight
- Bob Martin
- Dick Scanlan
- John Weidman
- Hugh Wheeler
- Alfred Uhry
- Peter Stone

2 nominations

- Douglas Carter Beane
- Chad Beguelin
- Scott Brown
- Harvey Fierstein
- John Guare
- Rupert Holmes
- Robert Horn
- Anthony King
- Jonathan Larson
- Jim Lewis
- Marla Mindelle
- Marsha Norman
- Lynn Nottage
- Jeff Whitty
- Doug Wright

== See also ==
- Tony Award for Best Book of a Musical
