= Charles Cholmondeley =

Charles Cholmondeley may refer to:

- Charles Cholmondeley (politician), British landowner and politician
- Charles Cholmondeley (intelligence officer), British intelligence officer
