= Brandon Contreras =

21st century actor and writer

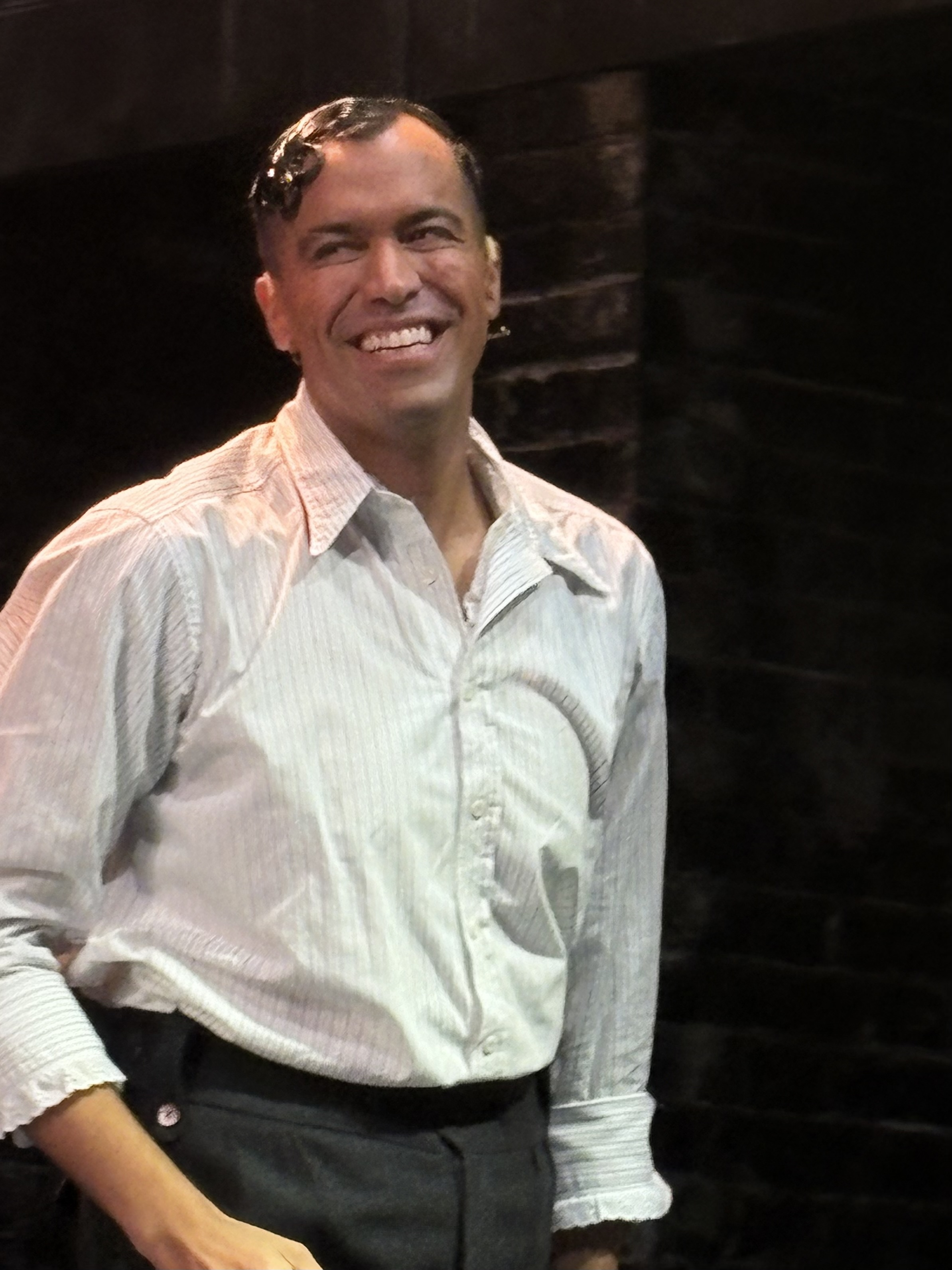
- Contreras at the curtain call for Operation Mincemeat, 2025
- Born: March 20, 1990 (age 36)
- Education: Pace University (BFA)
- Occupations: Actor, writer
- Known for: The Homo Sapiens Experience
- Website: www.brandoncontreras.com

Brandon Contreras (born March 20, 1990) is an actor and writer. They are best known as the co-creator of queer sketch comedy group The Homo Sapien Experience and for their Broadway and off-Broadway musical theatre roles.

== Early life and education ==
Contreras attended Pace University, where they received a BFA in musical theatre in 2012.

== Career ==
In 2018 Contreras started the queer sketch comedy group The Homo Sapien Experience with friend Matt Curiano, which as of 2024 had 1.5 million followers on TikTok.

In 2019, Contreras originated the role of Silent Ed Vallencourt in the Old Globe production of Almost Famous after having been involved in the show's development. In 2022, they reprised the role in the Broadway production, marking their Broadway debut.

In 2023, Contreras joined the principal cast of the off-Broadway production of Titanique as Cal. They took a week off in the middle of production to join the cast of the New York City Center Encores production of Titanic.

As of 2025, Contreras is the standby for the role of Charles Cholmondeley & Others, as well as the second cover for the role of Hester Leggatt & Others in the Broadway production of Operation Mincemeat. On February 9th, it was announced that they would be taking over as the principal actor for the role of Charles Cholmondeley & Others.

== Personal life ==
Contreras is gay and uses they/he pronouns. They are Latino.
