= Dogs in Space (TV series) =

Animated television series

- Season 1 promotional poster; from left to right: Nomi, Garbage and Ed
- Genre: Action; Adventure
- Created by: Jeremiah Cortez
- Developed by: James Hamilton; Adam Henry; Jeremiah Cortez
- Voices of: Haley Joel Osment; Sarah Chalke; Kimiko Glenn; Chris Parnell; David Lopez; William Jackson Harper; Debra Wilson; Stephanie Beatriz
- Theme music composer: Ray Giron (theme music by Ray Giron; produced by Matt Mahaffey)
- Composers: Matt Mahaffey; Ray Giron (associate)
- Countries of origin: Canada; United States
- Original language: English
- No. of seasons: 2
- No. of episodes: 20

Production
- Executive producers: Jeremiah Cortez; Adam Henry; Matthew Berkowitz; Kristin Cummings; Jennifer Twiner McCarron
- Editor: Ed Schimara
- Running time: 20–26 minutes
- Production companies: Netflix Animation Studios; GrizzlyJerr Productions; Atomic Cartoons

Original release
- Network: Netflix
- Release: November 18, 2021 – September 15, 2022

Dogs in Space is an animated action-adventure television series created by Jeremiah Cortez and developed by Cortez, James Hamilton and Adam Henry for Netflix. Produced by GrizzlyJerr Productions and Netflix Animation, with animation services by Atomic Cartoons, the first season premiered on November 18, 2021. The second and final season premiered on September 15, 2022.

== Synopsis ==
A few years into the future, genetically enhanced dogs are sent across the universe in search of a new home for the human race. In a series of adventures, these canines seek a planet that will save humanity and let them return to their beloved owners.

== Voice cast ==
=== Crew of Pluto ===
- Haley Joel Osment as Garbage, a cocky and impulsive corgi who serves as the main captain of the Pluto in Season 1 who is determined to find a new home for humanity. He briefly serves as a crew member of the team in Season 2 after being demoted as a result of making too many mistakes and with Kira was the last straw in the end of the first season. And eventually becoming co-captain with Stella at the end of the Season 2.
  - Oliver
  - Gracen Newton as Puppy Garbage
- Sarah Chalke as Stella, a sensible Sheltie who serves as tactical officer of the Pluto until the end of Season 1, where she is later promoted to become captain of the Pluto at the end and later on in the rest of the Season.
- Kimiko Glenn as Nomi, a Shih Tzu who serves as the brash, excitable pilot of the Pluto.
  - Sophie, a member of the Jupiter
  - Sophie Jean Wu as Puppy Nomi
- Chris Parnell as Ed, a Jack Russell Terrier kleptomaniac who serves as an "ambassador" of the Pluto.
  - Dawson Griffen as Puppy Ed
- David Lopez as Chonies, a chihuahua who is the Pluto's med/tech officer and a yes-man.
  - Dylan Alvarado as Puppy Chonies
- William Jackson Harper as Loaf, a nervous bulldog surveillance officer who helps the crew from the M-Bark.
- Debra Wilson as Kira, a laika who was sent to space by P.R.A.T.S in order to find humanity a new home to settle in and was stranded on an unknown planet until Garbage and his crew found her and rescued her. After being stranded and abandoned there for a very long period of time has led her to have insane problematic issues trusting humans, which led to her to betray the crew and taking over the M-Bark in order to get away from humanity, until Garbage convinced her that she wasn't abandoned by her owner and neither is P.R.A.T.S which eventually led her to feel regretfully remorseful of her actions which has resulted her in regaining her trust with humans as well as reconcile and make amends and with the crew of the Pluto and M-Bark. She currently lives on Earth with her owner and has conversations with Garbage's owner.
  - Duchess, a St. Bernard who is a member of the Council
  - Nova Reed as Puppy Kira
- Stephanie Beatriz as Pepper, a black Labrador Retriever who serves as the new member of the Pluto as their new tactical officer in Season 2, and was a former member of Neptune.

=== Recurring ===
- JP Karliak as Happy, a poodle serving as the captain of Venus and a member of the Council who antagonizes Garbage, and eventually make amends with him later on in Season 2.
  - Bucky
  - Luke, a security guard on the M-Bark
  - Bernie, a member of the Earth.
  - Barclay, owner of a tea shop on the M-Bark. After Garbage was demoted, he worked in Barclay's shop.
  - Magnificent Chipolata
- Michael Dorn as Pistachio Soup, a Sharpei who is the head of the Council.
- John DiMaggio as Jerry, a Chow Chow security guard on the M-Bark.
  - Gen. Huntrods, a human general of P.R.A.T.S on earth who's part of the program that sends dogs to space to find humanity a new home
  - Stardust, a Scottish Terrier, who was the former captain of the Pluto
  - Beetle
  - Fran, a reporter of P.R.A.T.S News.
  - Gary, an alien Shrubdub.
- Vyvy Nguyen as Dr. Chelsea, Garbage's human who is a scientist back on Earth.
- Deedee Magno Hall as Penelope, a Tibetan Spaniel who is the M-Bark's dog trainer and once a prize-winning show dog.
  - Elder Shrubdub, the caretaker of the planting
- Rena Strober as Dr. Olga, the human head scientist of the program and Kira's owner.
  - Luna, a Bedlington Terrier who is a member of the Council
  - Maple, a Shiba Inu who is a member of the Council
- Wil Wheaton as Atlas, a Boston Terrier who is the med/tech officer of Venus.

=== Guest stars ===
- Bobby Moynihan as Gooey ("Who's a Good Boy?")
- Andrew Kishino as Cy-bark ("Watch Me" and "Mistaken Id-ED-ity")
- Robin Atkin Downes as Captain Surgill ("Who Wants a Treaty?")
- Kate Mulgrew as Mavis ("Mistaken Id-ED-ity")
- Becky Poole as Captain Tontun ("Let There Be Loaf")
- Yvette Nicole Brown as Captain Clawdia ("Barking Up the Wrong Tree")

== Episodes ==
=== Series overview ===
Season	Episodes	Originally released
1	10	November 18, 2021
2	10	September 15, 2022

=== Season 1 (2021) ===
No. overall	No. in season	Title	Directed by	Written by	Storyboarded by	Original release date
1	1	"Fetch"	Monica Davila	James Hamilton	Sam Szymanski and Johnny Vu	October 28, 2021 (Youtube); November 18, 2021 (Netflix)
2	2	"Here, Girl!"	Monica Davila	Megan Gonzalez	Sam Szymanski and Johnny Vu	November 18, 2021
3	3	"Spin"	James Suhr	Jack Bernhardt	Megan Ruiz and Sarah Visel	November 18, 2021
4	4	"Who's a Good Boy?"	Ed Chee & Carl Upsdell	Jillian Goldfluss	Chelsea Ker and Becky Wedel	November 18, 2021
5	5	"Settle Down"	James Suhr	Amalia Levari	Megan Ruiz and Sarah Visel	November 18, 2021
6	6	"Speak"	Ed Chee & Carl Upsdell	James Huntrods	Roxy Beiklik and Chelsea Ker	November 18, 2021
7	7	"Stay"	Monica Davila	Jillian Goldfluss	Sam Szymanski and Johnny Vu	November 18, 2021
8	8	"Watch Me"	James Suhr	Megan Gonzalez	Megan Ruiz and Sarah Visel	November 18, 2021
9	9	"Leave It"	Ed Chee & Carl Upsdell	Amalia Levari	Roxy Beiklik and Chelsea Ker	November 18, 2021
10	10	"Drop It"	Monica Davila	James Hamilton	Paulene Phouybanhdyt, Sam Szymanski and Johnny Vu	November 18, 2021

=== Season 2 (2022) ===
No. overall	No. in season	Title	Directed by	Written by	Storyboarded by	Original release date
11	1	"Galactic Tactics"	James Suhr	Megan Gonzalez	Megan Ruiz and Sarah Visel	September 15, 2022
12	2	"Who's a Tea Boy?"	Ed Chee & Carl Upsdell	Jillian Goldfuss	Roxy Beiklik and Chelsea Ker	September 15, 2022
13	3	"Who Wants a Treaty?"	Monica Davila	Amalia Levari	Paulene Phouybanhdyt and Johnny Vu	September 15, 2022
14	4	"Paws & Rewind"	James Suhr	Natasha Hodgson & Zoë Roberts	Thomas Kanter and Megan Ruiz	September 15, 2022
15	5	"Mistaken Id-ED-ity"	Ed Chee & Carl Upsdell	Megan Gonzalez	Roxy Beiklik and Sam To	September 15, 2022
16	6	"Let There Be Loaf"	Monica Davila	Jillian Goldfuss	Paulene Phouybanhdyt and Johnny Vu	September 15, 2022
17	7	"Freeze Out"	James Suhr	Amalia Levari	Thomas Kanter and Megan Ruiz	September 15, 2022
18	8	"Garbage's Horrorscope"	Ed Chee & Carl Upsdell	Brittany Jo Flores	Roxy Beiklik and Chelsea Ker	September 15, 2022
19	9	"No Good Seed Goes Unpunished"	Monica Davila	James Huntrods	Paulene Phouybanhdyt and Johnny Vu	September 15, 2022
20	10	"Barking Up the Wrong Tree"	James Suhr	James Hamilton	Thomas Kanter and Megan Ruiz	September 15, 2022

== Production ==
The series was first announced in June 2021. The Amazing World of Gumball alumni James Hamilton served as co-developer and head writer of the series.

In November 2021, it was confirmed that the show would receive a second season.

On August 8, 2024, it was announced that the series was cancelled after two seasons.

== Release ==
The first season of Dogs in Space was released on November 18, 2021, on Netflix. A trailer was released on October 19. The second season was released on September 15, 2022.
