= Martin Benson =

Martin Benson may refer to:

- Martin Benson (actor) (1918–2010), English character actor
- Martin Benson (bishop) (1689–1752), English churchman, archdeacon of Berkshire and bishop of Gloucester
- Martin H. Benson (1879–1972), co-founder of the bookmaker Douglas Stewart
- Martin Benson (artistic director) (1937–2024), American artistic director
- Martin Benson, character in comedy novels by Michael Carson
