= Jimmy Awards =

Annual awards for high school musical theater

- Awarded for: Outstanding high school student performances
- Location: New York City
- Presented by: The Broadway League; Pittsburgh CLO; Nederlander Alliances, LLC
- First award: 2009
- Currently held by: Samia Posadas for Bright Star (2026); Jake James for Water for Elephants High School Edition (2026)
- Website: JimmyAwards.com

The National High School Musical Theatre Awards, more commonly known as the Jimmy Awards, are awards given annually to recognize musical theatre performances by high school students in the United States. Two main awards are given each year, Best Performance by an Actress and Best Performance by an Actor.

Performers qualify as nominees by winning a regional competition in one of 51 participating regional awards programs across the country. Nominees travel to New York City to perform at a talent showcase held on Broadway. Winners and finalists receive a scholarship (in 2019, winners received $25,000 scholarships). Winners and nominees have often gone on to significant careers in musical theatre, such as Eva Noblezada, Reneé Rapp, McKenzie Kurtz, Ryan McCartan and Andrew Barth Feldman, who went on to starring roles in Broadway productions. The Jimmys have been described by The New York Times as "The Tonys, for teenagers."

== History ==
The Jimmy Awards were inspired by the Gene Kelly Awards, an award given by the Pittsburgh Civic Light Opera since 1991, honoring musical theatre productions put on by high schools in the Pittsburgh area. Van Kaplan, the executive producer of the Pittsburgh Civic Light Opera, pitched the idea of creating a nationwide version of the awards to the Nederlander Organization. The two organizations founded the new award, naming it after the Broadway producer and theatre owner James ("Jimmy") M. Nederlander. The first Jimmy Awards were held in 2009 at NYU's Skirball Center for the Performing Arts, with 32 contestants from 16 regions. The 2010 awards were held at the Marquis Theatre, with all subsequent shows held at the Minskoff Theatre.

The awards became a success, in part due to growing popularity online of videos of performances from the award show (particularly the show's signature medleys). In 2012, PBS released a three-part documentary series, Broadway Or Bust, following the nominees of the Jimmy Awards that year. In 2014, The Broadway League Foundation (the charitable arm of The Broadway League, which produces the Tony Awards) took over the management of the Jimmy awards. The number of participating regional theatres has increased over time, reaching a high of 43 regional competitions (and 86 nominees) in 2019.

The 2020 awards were cancelled due to the COVID-19 pandemic. The 2021 awards were presented virtually.

In 2024, the Jimmy Awards celebrated its 15th Anniversary, with many alumni returning to the event to present and sing with the nominees.

== Qualification ==
Students qualify for the Jimmys based on a role played in a high school musical production that year. The role must be significant (for example, the character must perform at least one solo).

Approximately 40 theatres belonging to the Broadway League hold "Regional Awards Programs" (RAPs), each of which selects two winners for the region (a Best Actor, and Best Actress) who then become Jimmy Award nominees. The RAP selects candidates by reviewing high school musical productions. Selected candidates perform at an RAP award ceremony (which must be a "full-scale public event" with at least 100 attendees), performing in the same role they played in their high school production.

== Award show ==
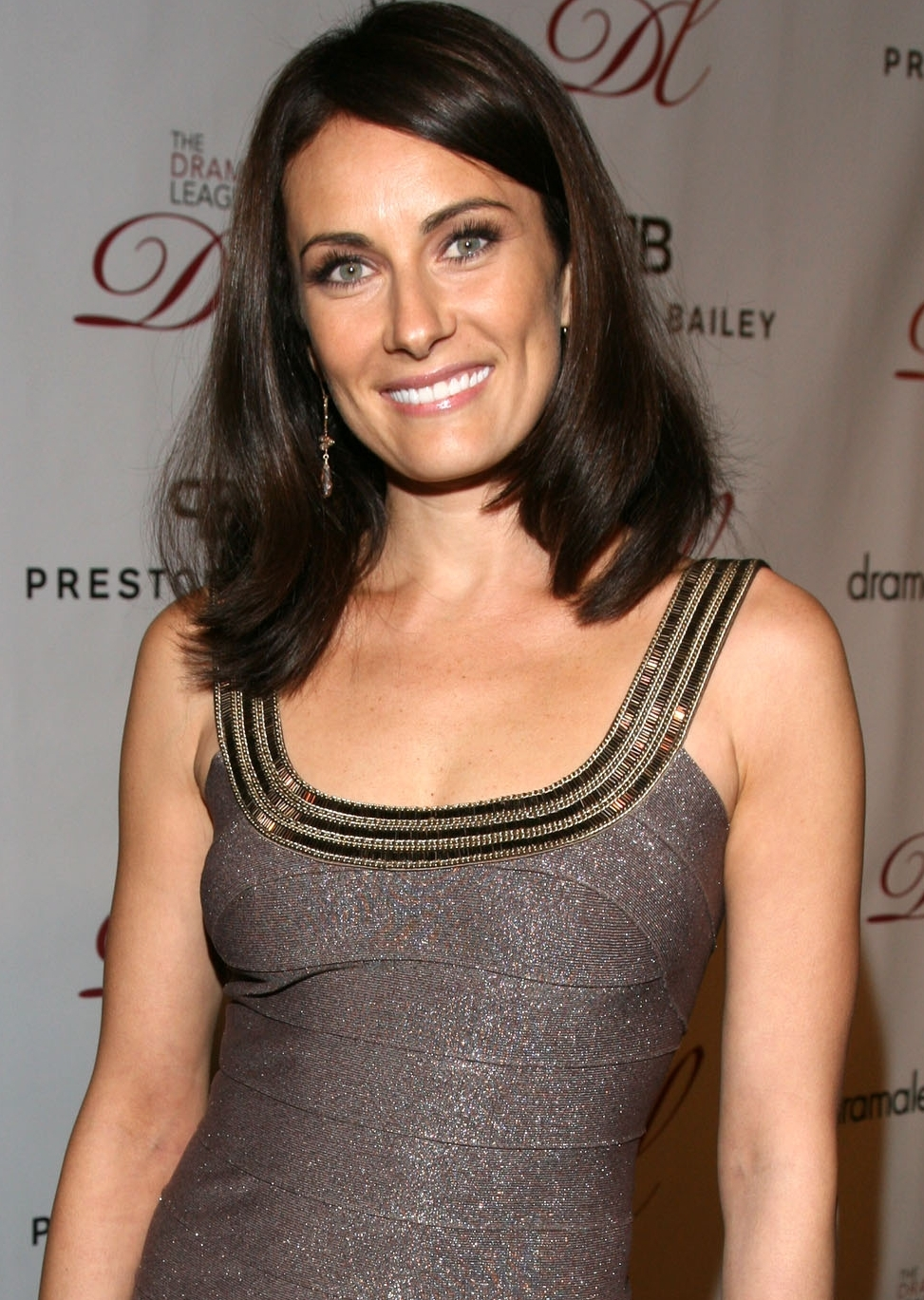
Tony Award-winning Broadway performer Laura Benanti hosted the 2018 Jimmy Awards ceremony.

The Jimmy Award nominees travel to New York City for a week in June, culminating in a live show in which the winners are determined. During the week, the nominees rehearse their performances for the award show and receive coaching from industry professionals. The show is directed by Van Kaplan, choreographed by Kiesha Lalama, and music supervised and conducted by Geoffrey Ko.

The award show is held at the Minskoff Theatre on Broadway, and is typically hosted by a celebrated Broadway actor (for example Laura Benanti in 2018).

The show begins with an opening number (typically a "mega-mix of contemporary Broadway hits") involving all nominees, followed by a series of "showcase medleys", in which several nominees appear in costume in the role they performed in their high school's musical, each in turn singing a short solo, while the remaining performers act as backup singers and dancers. These medleys have gained a cult following, with fans appreciating the crossover between disparate popular musicals. Since 2016, due to an increasing number of nominees and time limitations, only a portion of nominees have participated in showcase medleys, with the remainder instead performing in a group number. The medley format was conceived by original musical director Michael Moricz.

During an intermission, a panel of experts selects about eight finalists. During the show's second half, the finalists each perform a solo backed by a pianist, and the winners are announced followed by the closing number performed by all of the nominees. In addition to the main awards of Best Performance by an Actress and Best Performance by an Actor, other awards are given out with smaller prizes. In 2023, awards were given for Best Dancer, Rising Star, Best Performance in an Ensemble, and Spirit of the Jimmys, each associated with a $2,000 scholarship. All finalists also receive a $3,000 scholarship toward their future education.

== Winners and finalists ==
=== 2000s ===
Year	Actor	Hometown	Musical	Character	Notes
2009; 1st Jimmy Awards
2009; 1st Jimmy Awards	Stephen Mark	Ridgefield, Connecticut	Thoroughly Modern Millie	Jimmy Smith	John in national touring company of Anything Goes
2009; 1st Jimmy Awards	Kian McCollum	Pittsburgh, Pennsylvania	The Wedding Singer	Robbie Hart	
2009; 1st Jimmy Awards	Joseph Pudetti	Rochester, New York	Godspell	Jesus	
2009; 1st Jimmy Awards	Jenny Wine	Wichita, Kansas	The Wedding Singer	Julia Sullivan	
2009; 1st Jimmy Awards	Grace Hardin	Waterbury, Connecticut	Thoroughly Modern Millie	Millie Dillmount	

=== 2010s ===
Year	Actor	Hometown	Musical	Character	Notes
2010; 2nd Jimmy Awards
2010; 2nd Jimmy Awards	Kyle Selig	Long Beach, California	Singin' in the Rain	Don Lockwood	Made Broadway debut in The Book of Mormon in 2013; Baby John in the 2016 Hollywood Bowl production of West Side Story with the Los Angeles Philharmonic; Homer Hickam in the 2016 musical, October Sky, inspired by the film of the same name at the Old Globe Theatre; Aaron Samuels in 2018 Broadway musical, Mean Girls; Replaced Grant Gustin as Jacob Jankowski in Water for Elephants in September 2024; Cast in Los Angeles and Broadway production of Stephen Sondheim's Old Friends
2010; 2nd Jimmy Awards	Alex Field	Pittsburgh, Pennsylvania	The Wiz	Tinman	
2010; 2nd Jimmy Awards	Matthew Hill	San Jose, California	Dirty Rotten Scoundrels	Freddy Benson	Cast in Les Miserables on national tour
2010; 2nd Jimmy Awards	John Jorge	Woodbridge, Connecticut	Les Misérables	Jean Valjean	
2010; 2nd Jimmy Awards	Alexandria Payne	Atlanta, Georgia	Once on This Island	Ti Moune	Cast in the national tour of The Lion King at age 10
2010; 2nd Jimmy Awards	Katie Sapper	San Diego, California	Little Shop of Horrors	Audrey	
2010; 2nd Jimmy Awards	Stephanie Styles	Houston, Texas	The Drowsy Chaperone	Janet Van De Graaff	Louisa von Trapp in national tour of The Sound of Music at age 12; Katherine Plumber in 1st national tour of Newsies; Made Broadway debut as Lois Lane/Bianca in the 2019 revival of Kiss Me, Kate
2011; 3rd Jimmy Awards
2011; 3rd Jimmy Awards	Ryan McCartan	Minneapolis, Minnesota	How to Succeed in Business Without Really Trying	J. Pierrepont Finch	Diggie on the Disney Channel comedy Liv and Maddie; Jason "J.D." Dean in 2013 Off-Broadway run of Heathers: The Musical; Brad Majors in 2016 television musical, The Rocky Horror Picture Show: Let's Do the Time Warp Again; Made Broadway debut as Fiyero in Wicked in 2018 and played Hans in Frozen on Broadway in 2020 and on tour in 2022.; Replaced Jeremy Jordan as Jay Gatsby in The Great Gatsby on Broadway
2011; 3rd Jimmy Awards	Seth Jones	Kansas City, Missouri	Crazy for You	Bobby Child	
2011; 3rd Jimmy Awards	Mackenzie Orr	Irving, Texas	Into the Woods	Baker	
2011; 3rd Jimmy Awards	Shauni Ruetz	Rochester, New York	Into the Woods	Witch	
2011; 3rd Jimmy Awards	Kirsten Hoover	Pittsburgh, Pennsylvania	No, No, Nanette	Nanette	
2011; 3rd Jimmy Awards	Breyannah Tillman	Memphis, Tennessee	Aida	Aida	
2012; 4th Jimmy Awards
2012; 4th Jimmy Awards	Joshua Grosso	Tampa, Florida	The Phantom of the Opera	Raoul de Chagny	Marius in the U.S. touring company of Les Misérables; Replacement Telephone Guy in U.S. tour of The Band's Visit; Ensemble of Gatsby: An American Myth at American Repertory Theater; Swing in New York City Center Encores! production of Urinetown; Cast as Nick Carraway in the national tour of The Great Gatsby
2012; 4th Jimmy Awards	Evan Greenberg	Atlanta, Georgia	The 25th Annual Putnam County Spelling Bee	William Barfée	
2012; 4th Jimmy Awards	Drew Shafranek	Irving, Texas	The Music Man	Harold Hill	
2012; 4th Jimmy Awards	Elizabeth Romero	Fullerton, California	Damn Yankees	Lola	
2012; 4th Jimmy Awards	Nicolette Burton	San Diego, California	Kiss Me, Kate	Lilli Vanessi / Katharine	
2012; 4th Jimmy Awards	Erica Durham	Pittsburgh, Pennsylvania	Aida	Aida	Cast as Squeak in the U.S. national tour of The Color Purple; Understudy (and later took over the role of Florinda) in the 2023 national tour of Into the Woods; Cast as Standby for Claire & Gil Brentley in the U.S. national tour of Maybe Happy Ending.
2013; 5th Jimmy Awards
2013; 5th Jimmy Awards	Taylor Varga	Newtown, Connecticut	How to Succeed in Business Without Really Trying	J. Pierrepont Finch	
2013; 5th Jimmy Awards	Michael Burrell	La Mirada, California	Into the Woods	Baker	
2013; 5th Jimmy Awards	Austin Crute	Atlanta, Georgia	The Wiz	Scarecrow	Starred in Booksmart and Daybreak
2013; 5th Jimmy Awards	Sarah Lynn Marion	Fullerton, California	Hello, Dolly!	Mrs. Dolly Gallagher Levi	Cast as understudy in the U.S. national tour of Kimberly Akimbo
2013; 5th Jimmy Awards	Jillian Caillouette	Waterbury, Connecticut	Little Women	Jo March	
2013; 5th Jimmy Awards	Martha Hellerman	Madison, Wisconsin	Spring Awakening	Wendla Bergmann	
2013; 5th Jimmy Awards	Eva Noblezada	Charlotte, North Carolina	Footloose	Ariel Moore	Made professional debut as Kim at age 17 in the West End revival of Miss Saigon in 2014; Éponine in West End production of Les Misérables in 2016; Made Broadway debut headlining Miss Saigon in 2017; Eurydice in both West End and Broadway productions of Hadestown in 2018 and 2019, respectively; Nominated for Tony Award for Best Actress in a Musical, for Miss Saigon in 2017, and again for Hadestown in 2019; Cast as Daisy in Paper Mill Playhouse and Broadway musical production of The Great Gatsby; Cast as Sally Bowles replacement in Broadway and West End productions of Cabaret in 2025
2014; 6th Jimmy Awards
2014; 6th Jimmy Awards	Jonah Rawitz	Chicago, Illinois	In the Heights	Usnavi	
2014; 6th Jimmy Awards	Mekhai Lee	Charlotte, North Carolina	Shrek The Musical	Shrek	Cast as Grady in 2017–18 U.S. national tour of The Color Purple
2014; 6th Jimmy Awards	Matthew Richards	Logan, Utah	The Scarlet Pimpernel	Percy Blakeney	
2014; 6th Jimmy Awards	Jai'Len Christine Li Josey	Atlanta, Georgia	Dreamgirls	Effie Melody White	Appeared in Tyler Perry's Love Thy Neighbor; Made Broadway debut as Pearl Krabs in SpongeBob SquarePants, The Broadway Musical in 2017
2014; 6th Jimmy Awards	Brooke Solan	Las Vegas, Nevada	The Drowsy Chaperone	Janet Van De Graaff	
2014; 6th Jimmy Awards	Sophia Tzougros	Dousman, Wisconsin	Thoroughly Modern Millie	Millie Dillmount	Made Broadway debut in Good Night and Good Luck
2015; 7th Jimmy Awards
2015; 7th Jimmy Awards	Anthony Skillman	Mission Viejo, California	Tarzan	Tarzan	
2015; 7th Jimmy Awards	Drayton Maclean Mayers	Memphis, Tennessee	Big Fish	Edward Bloom	
2015; 7th Jimmy Awards	Alec Michael Ryan	Houston, Texas	Dirty Rotten Scoundrels	Lawrence Jameson	Swing in A Beautiful Noise on National Tour and on Broadway; Cast in Jersey Boys on National Tour
2015; 7th Jimmy Awards	Marla Louissaint	New York, New York	Caroline, or Change	Caroline Thibodeaux	Ensemble member of the U.S. touring company of Beautiful: The Carole King Musical; Performed as Fate and as an understudy for Persephone in the national tour and Broadway productions of Hadestown
2015; 7th Jimmy Awards	Morgan Higgins	La Mirada, California	Les Misérables	Éponine Thénardier	Made Broadway debut as Marie in Bad Cinderella
2015; 7th Jimmy Awards	Marnie Quick	Pittsburgh, Pennsylvania	Shout! The Mod Musical	Orange Girl	
2016; 8th Jimmy Awards
2016; 8th Jimmy Awards	Josh Strobl	Los Angeles, California	Hairspray	Link Larkin	Universal cover for Broadway production of Dear Evan Hansen in 2019; Understudy for Ponyboy and Johnny in original Broadway cast of The Outsiders
2016; 8th Jimmy Awards	Cameron Chang	San Diego, California	The Drowsy Chaperone	Aldolpho	
2016; 8th Jimmy Awards	John Fredrickson	Dallas, Texas	Mary Poppins	Bert	
2016; 8th Jimmy Awards	Devin Moore	Pittsburgh, Pennsylvania	Les Misérables	Jean Valjean	
2016; 8th Jimmy Awards	Amina Faye	Charlotte, North Carolina	Ragtime	Sarah	Cast as Jane Seymour in the US Boleyn Tour of Six; Cast as Peggy Schuyler/Maria Reynolds in the Broadway production of Hamilton
2016; 8th Jimmy Awards	Kailey Boyle	Madison, Wisconsin	Once Upon a Mattress	Princess Winnifred	Cast in ensemble of Gatsby: An American Myth at the American Repertory Theater; Cast in ensemble of the Broadway production of Wanted: The Legend of the Sisters Clarke
2016; 8th Jimmy Awards	Lauren Johnson	Omaha, Nebraska	Seussical	Gertrude McFuzz	Cast as Lorraine in the 2022-23 US tour of Hairspray
2016; 8th Jimmy Awards	Marnie Quick (2)	Pittsburgh, Pennsylvania	9 to 5	Doralee Rhodes	
2017; 9th Jimmy Awards
2017; 9th Jimmy Awards	Tony Moreno	Orlando, Florida	Man of La Mancha	Don Quixote (Cervantes)	Swing in the Broadway production of The Book of Mormon in December 2022
2017; 9th Jimmy Awards	Antonio Cipriano	East Lansing, Michigan	Hello! My Baby	Mickey McKee	Cast in the premiere production of Jagged Little Pill.; Made Broadway debut in Broadway production of Jagged Little Pill in December 2019; Made television debut in a guest role on the 2019 series God Friended Me; Cast as Oren Bradley in Disney+ show, National Treasure: Edge of History; Series regular role of Will in Safehaven; Series regular of Logan in Off Campus
2017; 9th Jimmy Awards	Nathan Keffer	Nashville, Tennessee	Little Shop of Horrors	Seymour	
2017; 9th Jimmy Awards	Sam Primack	Tempe, Arizona	Catch Me If You Can	Frank Abagnale, Jr.	Joined the Broadway production Dear Evan Hansen as an understudy in 2019. Later took over the role full time for the last two weeks of the Broadway run; Cast as Evan Hansen in the first national tour of Dear Evan Hansen
2017; 9th Jimmy Awards	Sofia Deler	Orlando, Florida	Songs for a New World	Woman 1	Cast as Shelby in 2020 film production of The Prom; Understudy for Holly in original Broadway cast of Stereophonic
2017; 9th Jimmy Awards	Maggie Gidden	La Mirada, California	Footloose	Rusty	
2017; 9th Jimmy Awards	Hatty King	Nashville, Tennessee	Little Women	Jo March	Cast as Zoe Murphy in the 2024 national tour of Dear Evan Hansen
2017; 9th Jimmy Awards	Jasmine Amy Rogers	Houston, Texas	Into the Woods	Witch	Cast as Gretchen Weiners in the national tour of Mean Girls; Cast as Betty Boop in 2023 Chicago premiere and 2025 Broadway production of Boop! The Musical; Nominated for the 2025 Tony Award for Best Actress in a Musical for Boop! The Musical; Cast as Ericka Boafo in the Broadway production of School Girls; Or, the African Mean Girls Play; Cast as Maria Rainer in the Broadway revival of The Sound of Music
2018; 10th Jimmy Awards
2018; 10th Jimmy Awards	Andrew Barth Feldman	Long Island, New York	Catch Me If You Can	Frank Abagnale, Jr.	Made his Broadway debut as Evan Hansen in Dear Evan Hansen in January 2019; Cast as Linguini in the 2021 virtual benefit concert Ratatouille the Musical, based on the 2007 Disney/Pixar film; Made his television debut in the recurring guest role of Antoine in Season 2 of the Disney+ show High School Musical: The Musical: The Series; Made his feature film debut Starring opposite Jennifer Lawrence in No Hard Feelings
2018; 10th Jimmy Awards	Darian Goulding	Chicago, Illinois	Beauty and the Beast	Beast	
2018; 10th Jimmy Awards	J.R. Heckman	Cleveland, Ohio	The Secret Garden	Archibald Craven	Also a 2016 and 2019 Jimmy Awards nominee
2018; 10th Jimmy Awards	Riley Thad Young	Memphis, Tennessee	James and the Giant Peach	Grasshopper	Made Broadway debut in Harry Potter and the Cursed Child in 2024
2018; 10th Jimmy Awards	Reneé Rapp	Charlotte, North Carolina	Big Fish	Sandra Bloom	Made her Broadway debut as Regina George in Mean Girls in June 2019; Leighton in the HBO Max comedy series The Sex Lives of College Girls; Also cast as Regina George in the film based on the Mean Girls musical; Went on to a pop music career
2018; 10th Jimmy Awards	Sabrina Astle	La Mirada, California	Legally Blonde	Elle Woods	
2018; 10th Jimmy Awards	Emily Escobar	Tampa, Florida	Zombie Prom	Toffee	
2018; 10th Jimmy Awards	Marisa Ines Moenho	Palm Springs, California	Urinetown	Hope Cladwell	
2019; 11th Jimmy Awards
2019; 11th Jimmy Awards	Ethan Kelso	Logan, Utah	Big Fish	Will Bloom	
2019; 11th Jimmy Awards	Casey Likes	Tempe, Arizona	Les Misérables	Jean Valjean	Made his Broadway debut as William Miller in Almost Famous in October 2022.; Cast in a leading role in MGM horror film Dark Harvest; Cast as Gene Simmons in Neil Bogart biopic Spinning Gold; Cast as Marty McFly in the Broadway production of Back to the Future: The Musical; Cast as J.D. in the off-broadway revival of Heathers: The Musical; Cast as Luther in the Broadway production of Warriors
2019; 11th Jimmy Awards	Colin Miller	Albuquerque, New Mexico	Little Shop of Horrors	Seymour	
2019; 11th Jimmy Awards	Christian Spaay	Madison, Wisconsin	Les Misérables	Marius	
2019; 11th Jimmy Awards	Ekele Ukegbu	New York, New York	Aida	Aida	
2019; 11th Jimmy Awards	Jessi Kirtley	Atlanta, Georgia	Mary Poppins	Mary Poppins	Made Broadway debut as an understudy in the original cast of Operation Mincemeat; Cast as Jean Leslie in the year 2 cast of Operation Mincemeat
2019; 11th Jimmy Awards	Lexie Love	Seattle, Washington	Les Misérables	Éponine Thénardier	
2019; 11th Jimmy Awards	Marisa Ines Moenho (2)	Palm Springs, California	Sister Act	Deloris Van Cartier	

=== 2020s ===
Year	Actor	Hometown	Musical	Character	Notes
2021 12th Jimmy Awards
2021 12th Jimmy Awards	Bryson Battle	Charlotte, North Carolina	Guys and Dolls	Nicely Nicely Johnson	Semifinalist on Season 27 of The Voice; Making Broadway debut as Jellylorum in Cats: The Jellicle Ball
2021 12th Jimmy Awards	Benjamin Brown	Philadelphia, Pennsylvania	No applicable production	—	
2021 12th Jimmy Awards	Justin Cooley	Kansas City, Missouri	No applicable production	—	Made Broadway debut as Seth Weetis in Kimberly Akimbo and later reprised role on the first national tour; Nominated for Tony Award for Best Featured Actor in a Musical for Kimberly Akimbo in 2023
2021 12th Jimmy Awards	Mateo Lizcano	New York, New York	Songs for a New World	Man 1	Made his Broadway debut as an understudy in Dear Evan Hansen; Understudied for Aaron and Martin in Kimberly Akimbo
2021 12th Jimmy Awards	Elena Holder	Durham, North Carolina	Cry-Baby	Lenora	
2021 12th Jimmy Awards	Victoria Evans	Seattle, Washington	No applicable production	—	
2021 12th Jimmy Awards	Kuper Walker	Los Angeles, California	No applicable production	—	
2021 12th Jimmy Awards	Ava Wolesky	Kansas City, Missouri	Carrie	Carrie White	
2022; 13th Jimmy Awards
2022; 13th Jimmy Awards	Nicholas Barrón	San Antonio, Texas	The Baker's Wife	Dominique	Made Broadway debut in the ensemble of Ragtime; Took over for Ben Levi Ross in the role of "Mother's Younger Brother"
2022; 13th Jimmy Awards	Thomas Beeker	Denver, Colorado	The Music Man	Harold Hill	Made Co-Star appearance on NBC’s Chicago PD; Was cast in the National tour of Les Misérables
2022; 13th Jimmy Awards	Dakota Renteria	Las Vegas, Nevada	Big Fish	Edward Bloom	
2022; 13th Jimmy Awards	Joshua Thompson	Durham, North Carolina	Tuck Everlasting	Miles Tuck	
2022; 13th Jimmy Awards	Kendall Becerra	San Diego, California	In the Heights	Nina	Cast as Kat in the U.S. national tour of Mystic Pizza.
2022; 13th Jimmy Awards	Sophie Pollono	Los Angeles, California	Into the Woods	Cinderella	Played Layne Reed on the Disney Channel series Fast Layne
2022; 13th Jimmy Awards	Symoné Spencer	Durham, North Carolina	Funny Girl	Fanny Brice	
2022; 13th Jimmy Awards	Anna Zavelson	San Antonio, Texas	Anastasia	Anya	Cast as Clara in the New York City Center's Encores! production of The Light in the Piazza; Replaced Jordan Tyson as Younger Allie in Broadway production of The Notebook; Cast as Christine Daae in West End production of The Phantom of the Opera
2023 14th Jimmy Awards
2023 14th Jimmy Awards	Langston Lee	Austin, Texas	Anastasia	Dmitry	
2023 14th Jimmy Awards	Corbin Drew Ross	Dallas, Texas	Anastasia	Dmitry	Cast as Sodapop Curtis on the first national tour of The Outsiders
2023 14th Jimmy Awards	Christian Strong	Columbus, Ohio	Kinky Boots	Lola	
2023 14th Jimmy Awards	Omar Andre Real	Palm Springs, California	Bat Boy	Bat Boy	
2023 14th Jimmy Awards	Lauren A. Marchand	New York, New York	Frozen	Elsa	
2023 14th Jimmy Awards	Maya Sharma	West Palm Beach, Florida	Freaky Friday	Ellie	
2023 14th Jimmy Awards	Samia Posadas	Tucson, Arizona	Legally Blonde	Elle Woods	
2023 14th Jimmy Awards	Anna Wright	St. Louis, Missouri	Bright Star	Alice Murphy	
2024 15th Jimmy Awards
2024 15th Jimmy Awards	Damson Chola, Jr.	Cleburne, Texas	Little Shop of Horrors	Seymour	
2024 15th Jimmy Awards	Peter Dessert	Kansas City, Missouri	All Shook Up	Chad	
2024 15th Jimmy Awards	Luke Martin	Las Vegas, Nevada	Les Misérables	Jean Valjean	
2024 15th Jimmy Awards	James Thibault	New Haven, Connecticut	Les Misérables	Javert	
2024 15th Jimmy Awards	Gretchen Shope	Midland, Michigan	Alice by Heart	Alice	Cast as Ensemble and Understudy for Alice Paul and Lucy Burns in the first national tour of Suffs
2024 15th Jimmy Awards	Fabiola Caraballo Quijada	Dallas, Texas	Something Rotten!	Nostradamus	
2024 15th Jimmy Awards	Catherine Dosier	La Mirada, California	The Secret Garden	Lily Craven	
2024 15th Jimmy Awards	Samia Posadas (2)	Tucson, Arizona	Into the Woods	Cinderella	
2025 16th Jimmy Awards
2025 16th Jimmy Awards	Chris Hayes	Las Vegas, Nevada	Beauty and the Beast	Gaston	
2025 16th Jimmy Awards	Adam Bouchachia	Orlando, Florida	The Hunchback of Notre Dame	Quasimodo	
2025 16th Jimmy Awards	Seger Ott-Rudolph	Washington, D.C.	The Secret Garden	Archibald Craven	
2025 16th Jimmy Awards	Dawson Fullingim	Tulsa, Oklahoma	Mary Poppins	Bert	
2025 16th Jimmy Awards	Fabiola Caraballo Quijada (2)	Dallas, Texas	Big Fish	Sandra Bloom	Also a 2023 and 2024 Jimmy nominee; Cast as Juliet in the first national tour of & Juliet
2025 16th Jimmy Awards	JJ Korkin	West Palm Beach, Florida	The Drowsy Chaperone	The Drowsy Chaperone	
2025 16th Jimmy Awards	Kayla Rae	Palm Springs, California	A Chorus Line	Cassie	
2025 16th Jimmy Awards	Kinsley Stephens	Atlanta, Georgia	Hadestown	Eurydice	
2026 17th Jimmy Awards
2026 17th Jimmy Awards	Jake James	Atlanta, Georgia	Water for Elephants	Jacob Jankowski	
2026 17th Jimmy Awards	Langston Casey	St. Louis, Missouri	Little Shop of Horrors	Seymour	
2026 17th Jimmy Awards	Jackson Wright	Los Angeles, California	West Side Story	Tony	Also a 2025 Jimmy nominee
2026 17th Jimmy Awards	Josef Wright	Orlando, Florida	On the Town	Ozzie	
2026 17th Jimmy Awards	Samia Posadas (3)	Tucson, Arizona	Bright Star	Alice Murphy	Also a 2023 and 2024 Jimmy nominee and finalist; Toured with Josh Groban as a supporting vocalist
2026 17th Jimmy Awards	Emersyn Hunt	New York, New York	Come From Away	Beverley	
2026 17th Jimmy Awards	London Mays	Austin, Texas	Alice by Heart	Alice	
2026 17th Jimmy Awards	Amaya Washington	Columbus, Ohio	Pippin	Leading Player	
