= The Sink: A Sleep Aid =

2020 comedy-horror podcast

The Sink: A Sleep Aid is a 2020 comedy-horror podcast from BBC Sounds. It was written by Natasha Hodgson and featured vocal performances from Alice Lowe, Celeste Dring, David Elms, Jason Forbes, and Natasha Hodgson. David Cumming composed and performed the soundtrack.

== Episodes ==
Number	Title	Release date	Ref
1	"Session One: Wet Ham Slice"	28 October 2020	
2	"Session Two: Kevin Boots"	4 November 2020	
3	"Session Three: Dip Day"	11 November 2020	
4	"Session Four: Balanced for Eggs"	18 November 2020	
5	"Session Five: Real Laser Gun Action"	25 November 2020	
6	"Session Six: When We Don't Come Back"	2 December 2020	

== Critical reception ==
"The Sink: A Sleep Aid" was generally critically acclaimed. The Stylist described it as a "wonderfully weird genre-bending delight," and The Week noted the quality of the sound design. The Guardian reviewed the show multiple times, describing it as "deliciously bizarre" and "brilliantly unsettling", praising the "dreamlike quality" of the prose and the voice acting acumen of the narrator (Alice Lowe). The podcast has also been reviewed by SFX magazine, the Simplecast official blog, and The Cambridge Geek.

The series was nominated for the 2021 BBC Audio Drama Award for "Best Podcast or Online Audio Drama". and was ranked No. 14 in the "20 Best Podcasts of 2020" by The Guardian.
