= Robert Ariza =

American stage actor (born 1990)

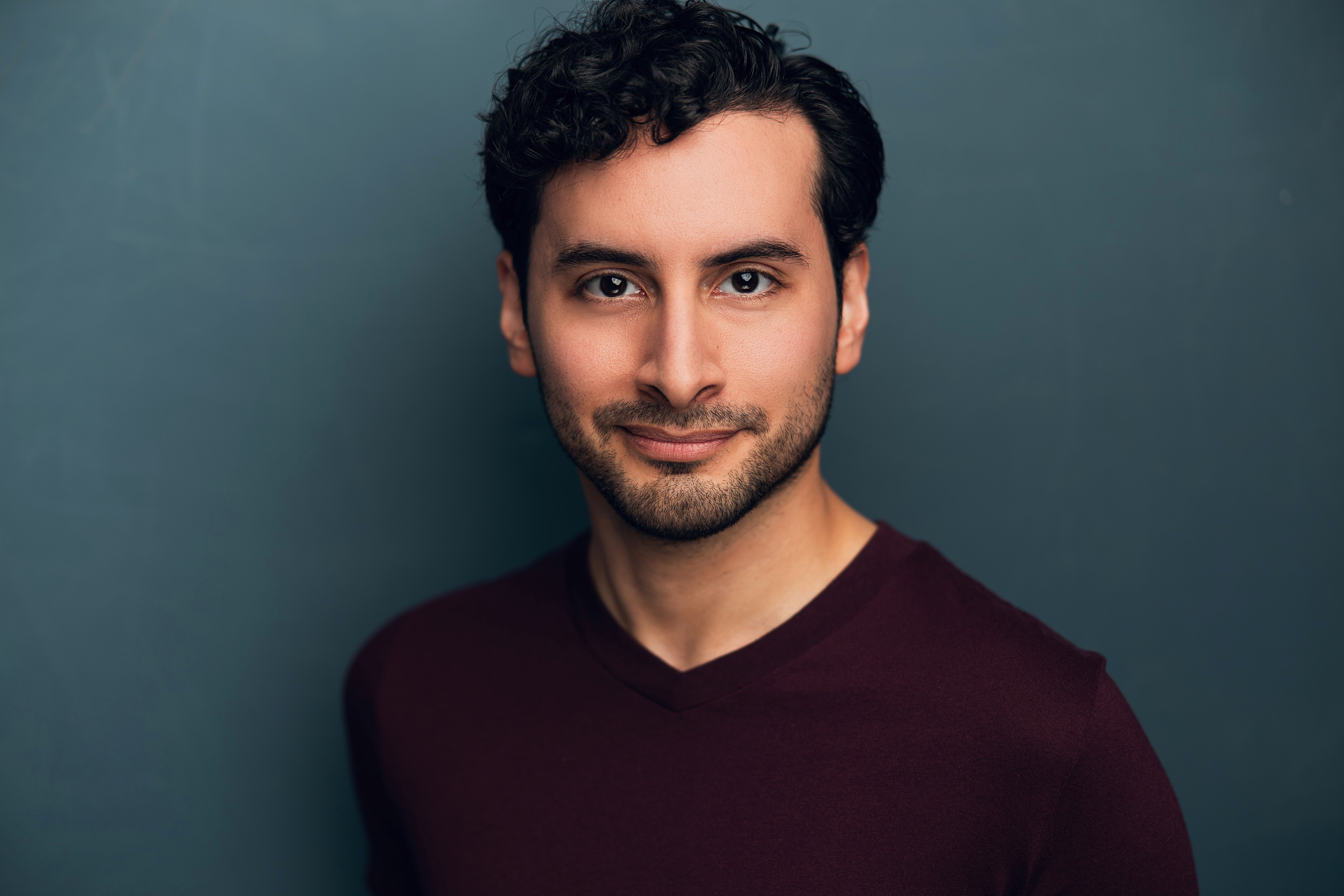
- Ariza in 2025
- Born: April 6, 1990 (age 36); Queens, New York
- Education: University of Michigan (B.F.A.)
- Occupation: Actor
- Website: robertariza.com

Robert Ariza (born April 6, 1990) is an American television and stage actor from Queens, New York. He is best known for his performances in the cast of Deaf West's 2015 revival of Spring Awakening, and in productions of Hamilton (Chicago), Les Misérables (National Tour), and Natasha, Pierre & The Great Comet of 1812 (Shanghai).

== Early life and education ==
Robert Ariza was born in Queens, New York. He first discovered musical theatre as a teenager, when he attended a teen drama camp and acted in a production of Footloose. He graduated from LaGuardia Arts High School, where he majored in Voice, and attended the University of Michigan, where he received a BFA in Musical Theatre.

== Career ==
=== Musical Theatre Wichita (2012-2014) ===
During and immediately after his time at the University of Michigan, Ariza performed with Musical Theatre Wichita, a summer theatre in Kansas, for three seasons. He made his MTW debut in 2012 summer season with ensemble roles in Fiddler on the Roof, 9 to 5, HONK!, and Singin' In The Rain. That same year, he was cast as Padaman/Nikos in MTW's Legally Blonde. In 2013, he played Courfeyrac in Les Misérables, Francis Lockwood in Betty Blue Eyes, and performed in the ensembles of Mary Poppins and The King and I. In the 2014 season, he played Professor in South Pacific, Chino in West Side Story, Butler in Joseph and the Amazing Technicolor Dreamcoat, FBI Agent Johnny Dollar in Catch Me If You Can, and Bert Barry in 42nd Street.

=== East Coast Theatre and Broadway Debut (2015-2017) ===
Ariza made his Broadway debut as a swing in Deaf West's 2015 revival of Spring Awakening. He learned American Sign Language for the role.

=== National Tours (2017-2020) ===
In 2017, he performed as Marius in the Les Misérables North American tour, and in 2020, he joined the Chicago production of Hamilton.

=== Return to Broadway (2026) ===
In February 2026, it was announced that Ariza would be returning to Broadway as an understudy for Charles Cholmondeley & Others and Hester Leggatt & Others in the first all-American cast of Operation Mincemeat.

== Theatre credits ==
| Year | Production | Role | Category | Ref |
|---|---|---|---|---|
| 2012 | Fiddler on the Roof | Ensemble | Musical Theatre Wichita | |
| 2012 | 9 To 5 | Bob Enright / Ensemble | Musical Theatre Wichita | |
| 2012 | HONK! | Ensemble | Musical Theatre Wichita | |
| 2012 | Singin' In The Rain | Ensemble | Musical Theatre Wichita | |
| 2012 | Legally Blonde | Padaman/Nikos | Musical Theatre Wichita | |
| 2013 | Les Misérables | Courfeyrac | Musical Theatre Wichita | |
| 2013 | Betty Blue Eyes | Francis Lockwood | Musical Theatre Wichita | |
| 2013 | Mary Poppins | Ensemble | Musical Theatre Wichita | |
| 2013 | The King and I | Ensemble | Musical Theatre Wichita | |
| 2014 | South Pacific | Professor | Musical Theatre Wichita | |
| 2014 | West Side Story | Chino | Musical Theatre Wichita | |
| 2014 | Joseph and the Amazing Technicolor Dreamcoat | Butler | Musical Theatre Wichita | |
| 2014 | Catch Me If You Can | FBI Agent Johnny Dollar | Musical Theatre Wichita | |
| 2014 | 42nd Street | Bert Barry | Musical Theatre Wichita | |
| 2015 | Spring Awakening | Melchior | Hangar Theatre | |
| 2015 | Spring Awakening | Swing u/s Melchior, Hanschen, Georg, Otto | Deaf West revival on Broadway | |
| 2015 | The Theory of Relativity | Ryan | Norma Terris Theatre with Goodspeed Musicals | |
| 2016 | Evita | Che | Olney Theatre Center | |
| 2016 | Spamilton | Lin-Manuel Miranda | Triad Theatre | |
| 2017 | soot and spit | Herbert | New Ohio Theatre, World Premiere | |
| 2018 | Les Misérables | Marius | North America tour | |
| 2019 | Hamilton | Ensemble u/s Alexander Hamilton, John Laurens/Philip Hamilton | Chicago, CIBC Theater | |
| 2020 | Joseph and the Amazing Technicolor Dreamcoat | Zebulon | Lincoln Center, 50th Anniversary Concert | |
| 2021 | The Visitor | Ensemble/Nasim | The Public Theater, World Premiere | |
| 2022 | Somewhere Over The Border | Adán/Cruz | Syracuse Stage & Geva Theatre, World Premiere | |
| 2022 | Sister Act | Pablo | Pittsburgh CLO | |
| 2023 | The Last Wide Open | Roberto | Adirondack Theatre Festival | |
| 2024 | Natasha, Pierre & The Great Comet of 1812 | Ensemble (u/s Pierre, Andrey) | The New Bund 31 PAC, Shanghai | |
| 2024 | Waitress | Earl | The Cape Playhouse | |
| 2025 | The 25th Annual Putnam County Spelling Bee | William Barfee | Peterborough Players | |
| 2025 | Little Shop of Horrors | Seymour | Playmakers Repertory Company | |
| 2026 | Operation Mincemeat | u/s Charles Cholmondeley & Others, Hester Leggatt & Others | John Golden Theatre, Broadway | |

== Television credits ==
| Year | Show | Ref |
|---|---|---|
| 2021 | Girls5Eva | |
| 2021 | Pose | |
| 2023 | Poker Face | |
| 2024 | Elsbeth | |
| 2025 | Law And Order: Organized Crime | |
| 2025 | FBI (CBS) | |

== Awards ==
| Year | Award | Outcome | Ref |
|---|---|---|---|
| 2013 | AEA Robert Sturtevant Award | Winner | |
| 2014 | Lotte Lenya Competition | Finalist | |
