= Marg Horwell =

Australian costume and set designer

- Born: Adelaide, Australia
- Education: Victorian College of the Arts
- Occupations: Costume and set designer
- Website: marghorwell.com

Marg Horwell is an Australian costume and set designer best known for her work on The Picture of Dorian Gray.

== Early life ==
Horwell attended Kooringal High School in Wagga Wagga, New South Wales. She studied theatre at Victorian College of the Arts in Melbourne.

== Career ==
In 2022, Horwell designed the set and costumes for Kip Williams's The Picture of Dorian Gray at the Roslyn Packer Theatre in Sydney. For this production, she won the Sydney Theatre Award for Best Stage Design of a Mainstage Production and a Green Room Award for Outstanding Costume Design. In 2024, the show transferred to the West End, where it played a sold out season at the Theatre Royal Haymarket. For this production, Horwell was nominated for two WhatsOnStage Awards and won the Laurence Olivier Award for Best Costume Design. In 2025, the show transferred to Broadway for a fourteen week engagement at the Music Box Theatre. At the 78th Tony Awards, Horwell was nominated for Best Scenic Design in a Play and won for Best Costume Design in a Play. Along with Dorian Gray star Sarah Snook, Horwell is one of the first Australians to win both an Olivier and a Tony.

In 2026, Horwell designed the set and costumes for Williams's West End production of Dracula.
