= The Visitor (musical) =

2021 stage musical

- Music: Tom Kitt
- Lyrics: Brian Yorkey
- Book: Kwame Kwei-Armah; Brian Yorkey
- Basis: The Visitor by Tom McCarthy
- Premiere: October 16, 2021: The Public Theater
- Productions: 2021 Off-Broadway

The Visitor is a stage musical with music and lyrics by Tom Kitt and Brian Yorkey and a book by Yorkey and Kwame Kwei-Armah, based on the 2007 film of the same name. It premiered at The Public Theater in October 2021.

== Production history ==
The musical was expected to have its world premiere at The Public Theater in New York City on October 7, 2021, for a limited run until November 21, 2021. Previews ultimately began on October 16 and it ran through December 5.

== Cast and characters ==
Character	Off-Broadway (2021)
Walter	David Hyde Pierce
Tarek	Ahmad Maksoud
Zainab	Alysha Deslorieux
Mouna	Jacqueline Antaramian
Nasim	Robert Ariza
