= Jessi Kirtley =

21st century stage actress

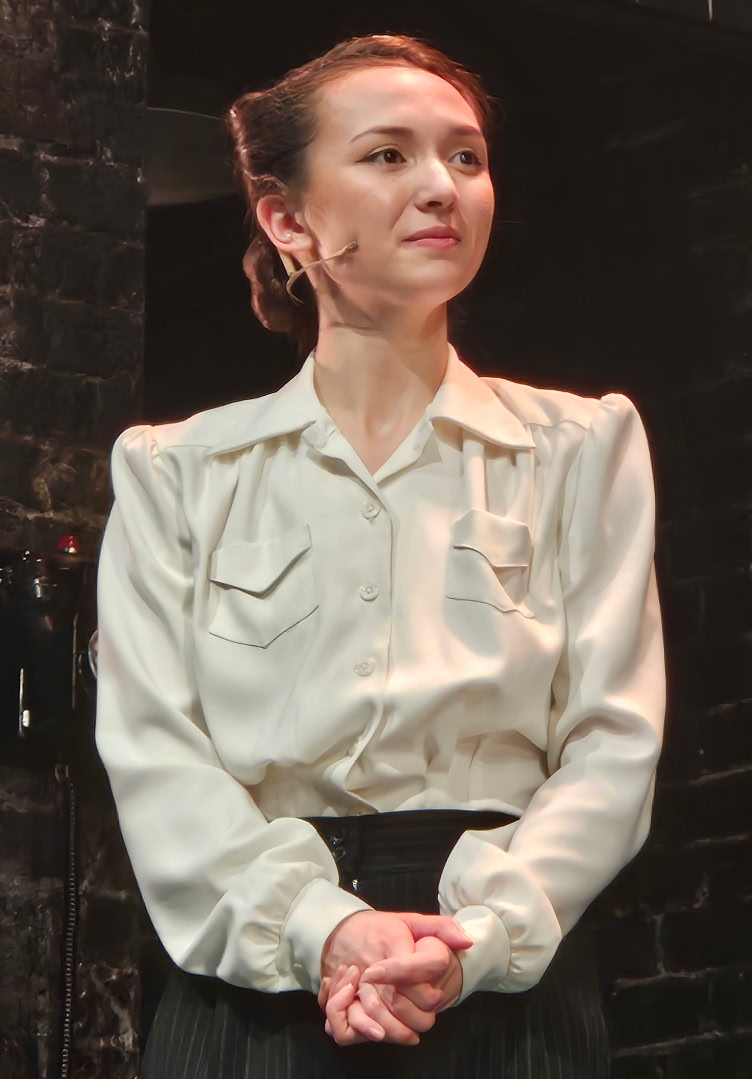
- Kirtley at the curtain call of Operation Mincemeat, 2026
- Education: Baldwin Wallace Conservatory
- Occupation: Actor
- Years active: 2022-present
- Website: jessikirtley.com

Jessi Kirtley is an American stage actress. She is known for her performance as Jean Leslie in Operation Mincemeat on Broadway.

== Early life and education ==
Kirtley is from Roswell, Georgia, where she attended Mountain Park Elementary School, Crabapple Middle School, and Roswell High School. She began performing at a young age, partaking in public school musicals, local public theater camps, and dance lessons. In 2018, she received a Schuler Award (Note: Also known as the Georgia High School Musical Theatre Awards) for Best Performance by a Supporting Actress for her performance as Paulette Bonafonte in Legally Blonde. The next year, for her performance as Mary Poppins as a junior in high school, she was awarded Best Leading Actress. Later that year, she performed at the Jimmy Awards, where she was a finalist.

Kirtley earned a Bachelor of Music in Music Theatre from the Baldwin Wallace Conservatory of Performing Arts.

== Career ==
Kirtley's professional theatre career began when she became a member of the Forestburg Playhouse resident company in 2022. Kirtley performed at Cleveland's Beck Center as Lizzie Borden in Lizzie: The Musical (2022) and Molly in Ghost (2023) as part of a collaboration between the Beck Center and Baldwin Wallace Conservatory of Music. In 2023, she led the Great Lakes Theatre production of Natasha, Pierre & The Great Comet of 1812 as Natasha to critical acclaim. The production premiered in Boise, Idaho at the Idaho Shakespeare Festival. In 2024, Kirtley played Claire in Ordinary Days at Playhouse Square.

In 2025, Kirtley joined the original Broadway cast of Operation Mincemeat as first cover for Jean Leslie & Others and dance captain, marking her Broadway debut. In February 2026, she was promoted to principal for the role.
