= Lexi Rabadi =

21st century American stage actress

- Rabadi at the curtain call of Operation Mincemeat, 2026
- Born: February 17, 1994 (age 32)
- Education: Pace University (BFA)
- Occupation: Actor
- Years active: 2011-present
- Website: lexi-rabadi.com

Lexi Rabadi (born February 17, 1994) is an American stage and television actress.

== Early life and education ==
Rabadi grew up in Albany, New York to an American-born mother and a Jordani father who immigrated to the U.S. as a teenager. She graduated from Pace University in 2016 with a BFA in Musical Theatre.

== Career ==
After graduating, Rabadi played Belle in two productions of Beauty and the Beast to critical acclaim. In 2019, she made her off-Broadway debut in Hannah Senesh: A Play With Music and Song as the titular character. In 2023, she made her Broadway debut as an original ensemble member in the 2023 revival of Sweeney Todd. In 2025, Rabadi played the character Kiki for a two-episode arc in season 3 of the television series And Just Like That.... In 2026, she joined the company of Operation Mincemeat as an understudy, primarily for the role of Jean Leslie & Others. Between roles, Rabadi teaches yoga.

== Theatre credits ==
Year	Show	Role	Category	Ref
2011	Les Misérables	Cosette	Upstate New York, Schenectady Light Opera Company	
2012	Baby: The Musical	Lizzie Fields	Upstate New York, Schenectady Light Opera Company	
2016	Beauty and the Beast	Belle	Pennsylvania, Fulton Theatre	
2018	Beauty and the Beast	Belle	Maine, Maine State Music Theatre	
2018	A Christmas Carol	Belle/Mrs. Fred	Kentucky, Actors Theatre of Louisville	
2019	The Glass Menagerie	Laura	Pennsylvania, Fulton Theatre	
2019	Hannah Senesh: A Play With Music and Song	Hannah Senesh	Off-Broadway, National Yiddish Theatre Folksbiene	
2021	Kismet	Ensemble, Marsinah u/s	California, Granada Theatre	
2022	Something Rotten!	Portia	Utah, Pioneer Theatre Company	
2023	Sweeney Todd	Ensemble	Broadway, Lunt-Fontanne Theatre	
2025	Waitress	Dawn	Utah, Pioneer Theatre Company	
2025	The Mulberry Tree	Kokab u/s	Off-Broadway, La MaMa	
2026	Operation Mincemeat	Jean Leslie & Others u/s	Broadway, Golden Theatre	
