= Natasha Hodgson =

English actress, singer, podcaster, writer and co-artistic director

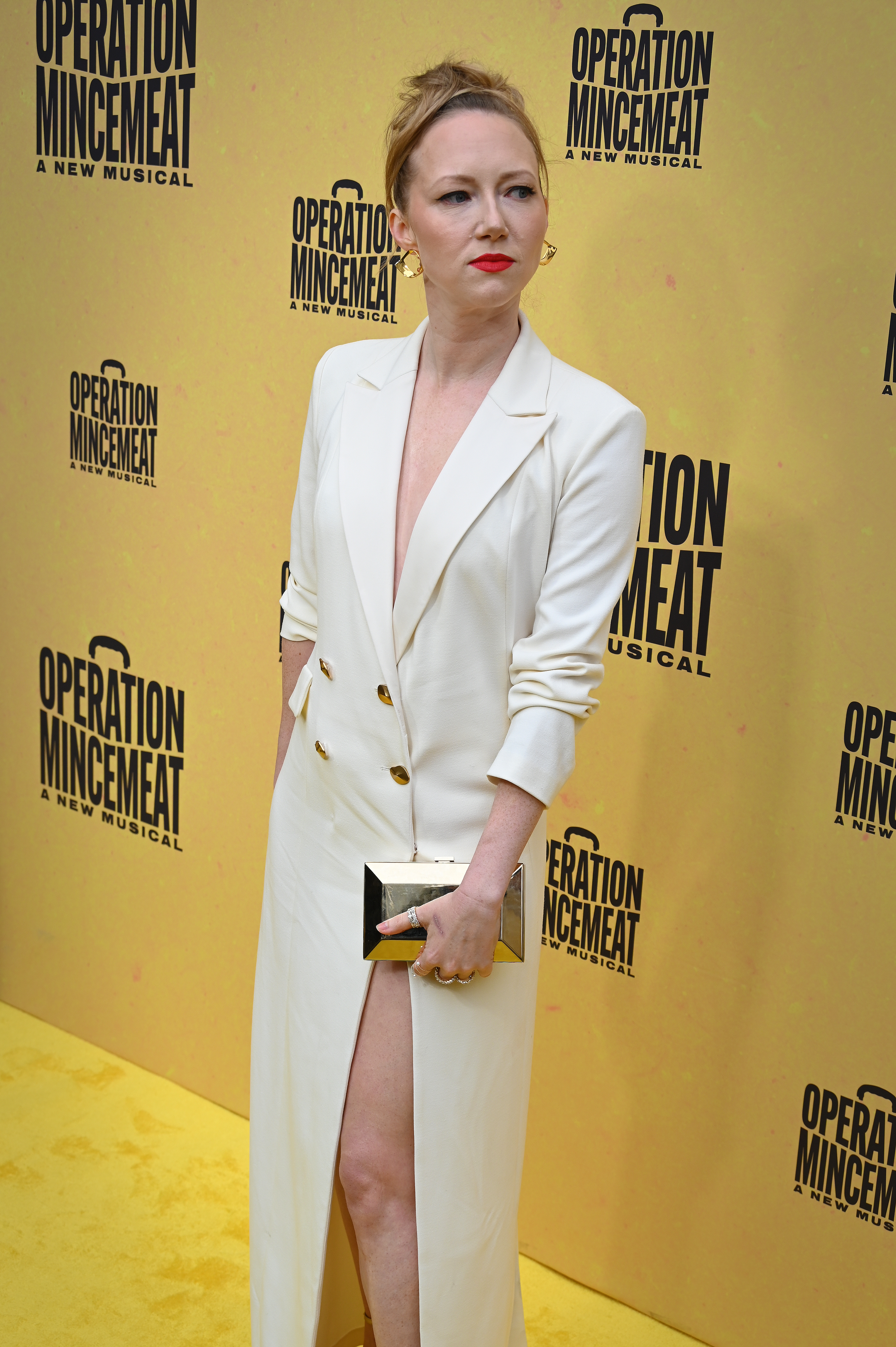
- Natasha Hodgson at Operation Mincemeat’s opening night on Broadway in 2025
- Born: 26 November 1986 (age 39)
- Education: Warwick University
- Years active: early 2000s–present

Natasha Hodgson (born 26 November 1986) is an English actress, singer, writer, podcaster and artistic director. She co-created and performed the musical Operation Mincemeat with the comedy troupe SpitLip.

For her work on Operation Mincemeat, Hodgson won the Laurence Olivier Award for Best New Musical and the WhatsOnStage Award for Best New Musical alongside SpitLip and received three Tony Award nominations for the show for Best Musical, Best Book of a Musical and Best Original Score.

== Early life and education ==
Hodgson grew up in Croft, Cheshire and attended Croft Primary School. At the age of 12, her first professional acting work was a role in an episode of the CITV sci-fi series Life Force, after appearing in the directory for a child casting agency owned by the parent of her friend. She later graduated from the University of Warwick, where she was involved in extra-curricular theatre.

== Career ==
=== Writing ===
Hodgson authored articles for various media outlets including MookyChick, Best for Film, and SFX magazine. She also wrote for the Don't Hug Me I'm Scared television series, Dogs in Space, The Amazing World of Gumball, and Bravest Warriors.

=== Kill the Beast ===
Hodgson co-founded Kill the Beast Theatre with David Cumming, Ollie Jones, Zoe Roberts, and Clem Garritty. The group originally met in university. Kill the Beast produced four stage productions, including The Boy Who Kicked Pigs (2013), He Had Hairy Hands (2014), Don't Wake The Damp (2016), and Director's Cut (2019).

=== Operation Mincemeat ===
Kill the Beast members Hodgson, Roberts, and Cumming, in addition to Felix Hagan, co-founded the comedy group SpitLip in 2017. The group collaboratively wrote and composed the musical Operation Mincemeat, which first premiered at the London Fringe New Diorama Theatre in 2019. Operation Mincemeat also played in Southwark Playhouse and Riverside Studios. The show opened in the West End on 29 March 2023, and has been renewed there fourteen times. The show opened on Broadway 20 March 2025, and in May 2025 was nominated for four Tony Awards, with three of these afforded to Hodgson and her SpitLip colleagues.

=== Voice acting and audio drama ===
Hodgson wrote, composed, and performed the audio for “LIDL | Big On A Christmas You Can Believe In”, the LIDL Christmas advert in 2020.

Hodgson created and starred in the audio drama The Sink: A Sleep Aid, which was released by BBC Sounds. The Sink was nominated for the "Best Podcast/Online Audio" Audio Drama Award in 2021, and was listed as a "Top 20 Podcast of 2020" by The Guardian. She also co-wrote the Kill the Beast production "Eglantine Whitechapel: Supernatural Detective" and the Kill the Beast/Fremantle production "Who Exploded Viven Stone?", and voiced several characters in three episodes of Doctor Who Redacted for BBC Sounds.

She is a regular contributor to the Beef and Dairy Network Podcast, writing and starring in a Halloween special.

Hodgson narrated the audio book of Skipshock, a novel by Caroline O'Donoghue. The book is dedicated to her.
