= Operation Mincemeat (musical) =

British musical comedy

- A New Musical
- Production poster
- Music: David Cumming; Felix Hagan; Natasha Hodgson; Zoë Roberts
- Lyrics: David Cumming; Felix Hagan; Natasha Hodgson; Zoë Roberts
- Book: David Cumming; Felix Hagan; Natasha Hodgson; Zoë Roberts
- Setting: 1943, World War Two
- Basis: Operation Mincemeat
- Premiere: New Diorama Theatre
- Productions: 2019 New Diorama Theatre; 2020 and 2021 Southwark Playhouse; 2022 Riverside Studios; 2023 West End; 2025 Broadway; 2026 World tour
- Awards: WhatsOnStage Award for Best New Musical; Laurence Olivier Award for Best New Musical

Operation Mincemeat is a musical comedy with book, music and lyrics by David Cumming, Felix Hagan, Natasha Hodgson and Zoë Roberts (known as the musical comedy troupe SpitLip, with this show being their debut production). The plot is based on Operation Mincemeat, a Second World War British deception operation. The show received six Laurence Olivier Award nominations, winning two for Best New Musical and Best Actor in a Supporting Role in a Musical for Jak Malone, and garnered four Tony Award nominations including Best Musical, and won for Best Featured Actor in a Musical for Malone.

== Background ==
The basis of the musical is Operation Mincemeat, the successful 1943 British deception operation to disguise the Allied invasion of Sicily during the Second World War by making the Axis powers believe an invasion of Sardinia or Greece was actually imminent.

== Synopsis ==
=== Act I ===
In 1943, Naval intelligence officer Ewen Montagu welcomes the audience to MI5, where the "elite" of the British military contribute to the World War II effort ("Born to Lead"). Colonel Johnny Bevan informs his subordinates that the British government requires a strategy to convince the Nazis that the Allied Forces are planning to invade Sardinia rather than their actual (and more obvious) target, Sicily; several officers, including Montagu and Ian Fleming, present their ideas, but despite their conviction of their own brilliance ("God That's Brilliant"), Bevan dismisses them all as unrealistic and poorly planned. Sulking after his rejection, Montagu encounters Air Force officer and "amateur naturalist" Charles Cholmondeley, who has formulated a strategy code-named "Operation Mincemeat", but is convinced of its futility after being bullied out of line by Montagu and his colleagues ("Dead in the Water"). Montagu reads his plan, and despite declaring it "insane", recognises its potential and convinces Charles that they should team up to pitch Mincemeat to Bevan, noting his own natural "flair for presentation" will bolster Charles' lack of confidence.

Meanwhile, Bevan's secretary Hester Leggatt welcomes new clerk Jean Leslie to her team, who is eager to disrupt the typically side-lined role of women in MI5 and dreams of ranking alongside the male officers ("All the Ladies"). Although Jean tries to stop them while bringing Bevan tea, Montagu and Charles arrive at the last minute to pitch Mincemeat. After Charles fumbles their presentation, Montagu recognises Jean's worthwhile attempts to help and drafts her in to explain the plan: MI5 will obtain a male corpse, dress it as a British soldier who has drowned following a plane crash at sea, plant documents on it "revealing" the Allied plans to invade Sardinia, and place it off the coast of neutral Spain, where Nazi spies will discover it and use the documents as cause to move their troops from Sicily ("The Pitch"). Bevan is highly sceptical, but concedes that it is the one decent idea he has heard and allows the operation to proceed. Jean and Hester are officially drafted in as support, but Bevan covertly assigns Hester to investigate Montagu, who is believed to be in contact with his brother Ivor, a filmmaker who is suspected to be a spy for the Soviet government.

Together, Montagu, Charles, Jean and Hester create a fake Royal Marines major, "Bill Martin". To ensure his identity is "watertight", Hester falsifies numerous identification papers, Charles designs an airtight canister to ensure the corpse can be transported without rotting and Montagu and Jean source receipts for a week of leisure in London (by literally having a week of leisure in London). Montagu purchases an engagement ring so the receipt can be on Bill's person, along with a photograph of Jean posing as Bill's imagined fiancée ("Making a Man"). Charles notices that Montagu occasionally "misplaces" important files, but suppresses his concerns. A corpse, that of an unnamed transient who ingested rat poison, is obtained with the help of Montagu's morally dubious acquaintance Bernard Spilsbury ("Spilsbury"); the team are concerned about using it without the knowledge and consent of any relatives, let alone knowing his real name, but Montagu is adamant that it is better if the corpse is a "nobody". Bevan is unimpressed by the team's spending spree, but concedes that their creation is believable, suggesting that Bill should be carrying a letter from his fiancée. After dismissing Charles and Jean's questionable efforts at writing one ("Love is a Bird"), Hester indirectly relates her own story of the lover she lost during World War I, and agrees to a deeply moved Jean's request that she write the letter herself ("Dear Bill").

That night, Montagu and Charles arrive in Scotland to load "Bill's" corpse onto the submarine HMS Seraph; its crew are told that the sealed canister contains meteorological equipment ("Sail On, Boys"). Charles is deeply insecure about the result of the operation, but is swayed by Montagu into celebrating its completion in a carefree pub crawl, during which he witnesses a brief meeting between Montagu and his brother Ivor. ("Just For Tonight") Meanwhile, after enduring enemy attacks, the crew of the Seraph are unnerved by the contents of the canister but follow their orders, placing Bill in the sea off the Spanish coast before thanking him for his service.

=== Act II ===
The German army present a display of their apparent dominance, in the form of a high energy boy band performance. ("Das Übermensch"). After reprimanding the audience for "appreciating" the enemy, Bevan relates the progression of Mincemeat and reveals that a problem has arisen ("Bevan's Update"). The team await news from Vice-Consul Francis Haselden in Huelva, but are dismayed to learn that the victim of an aeroplane accident he calls to report is a live American soldier, also named William; they fear it will make Bill's story less believable. Moments later, they learn Bill has also been recovered, but the Spanish government is indeed suspicious and have ordered an autopsy. They instruct Haselden to make sure the briefcase holding the false plans is seized by the Nazi-populated Spanish authorities ("The Ballad of Willie Watkins").

Charles and Jean attempt to keep working through the crises, but Montagu believes they can do no more and simply wants to enjoy himself; he is hurt by Jean reminding him that their London excursions were merely for the operation. Bevan calls the team into his office to alert them to an unexpected complication: Spilsbury's methodology is flawed and he should not have been trusted with the operation ("Spilsbury Reprise"). Montagu insists that Mincemeat is running smoothly despite the setbacks, but Bevan orders the immediate abortion of all plans ("I Call Abort"); however, this fails to reach Haselden, who diligently ensures that the autopsy is rushed and the briefcase reaches the authorities ("Haselden's Got a Good Feeling"). After an animated reprimanding by Bevan for his nonchalance and failure to obtain consent for the use of Bill's body, Montagu takes his frustration out on Jean, fully dismisses her role in Mincemeat and orders her to go back to her role as a clerk and assistant. Furious and humiliated, Jean confesses to Hester that she'd pictured the veneration they'd receive if the operation was a success; Hester gently persuades her that not everyone who works for a cause will be recognised, but that does not make them any less valuable – whether they are spearheading an operation or making tea – and Jean thanks her for helping her to "grow" ("Useful"). Hester is inspired to recruit Jean into the investigation of Montagu's brother, asking her to continue dining with Montagu and encouraging him to talk about himself. Jean agrees to swallow her pride and investigate.

Montagu orders Haselden to drop hints that the British desperately want Bill's briefcase back in the hopes of alerting German spies. After stroking Haselden's ego to get him to cooperate, Montagu describes tactics for getting people to trust him, upsetting Charles, who has grown increasingly suspicious of seeing Montagu take files out of the office. Haseldon succeeds in his efforts: Bill's briefcase is taken to Berlin, but there is no sign the Germans plan on moving their troops ("Act as If"). Eventually, Montagu discovers Charles, Jean and Hester going through his possessions. Despite his protests, they read his files, learn that he is actually writing a film script about Mincemeat depicting himself as a hero. He was secreting files so that he could archive them for personal use, being careful not to let them into the wrong hands, and he was talking to Ivor – a filmmaker – to get his opinion on a rough, censored draft of the script. While appalled that he intends to sensationalise their story, Charles, Jean, and Hester conclude that Montagu is innocent of treason.

An update from Bevan then confirms that Haselden's whisper campaign has worked, and Adolf Hitler himself has ordered the transfer of German troops from Sicily to Sardinia. The Allies subsequently invade Sicily with little-to-no bloodshed. Bevan informs an ecstatic Montagu, Charles, Jean and Hester that Operation Mincemeat is officially a success, and that Montagu and Charles will receive the highest level of commendation in the British Army ("Did We Do It?"). As the team celebrate, Charles observes that the unfortunate moral of their story is that as long as you're in charge, you can do whatever you like.

To counteract this, they relate a summary of everything that occurred following the success of Mincemeat: the Second World War is won by the Allies with help from the US Army (who recruit a number of Nazis in the aftermath); Ian Fleming goes on to create James Bond; Haselden and his assistant Steve remain in Spain; Hester initiates a romance with Bevan; Jean looks ahead to the progress of feminism during and after the war; Montagu eventually makes (and acts in) his film about Operation Mincemeat; and Charles goes on to do classified work for MI5. As Bevan finishes relating the events of the operation to his superiors, they wonder who the man known as Bill Martin really was; the cast address the audience to inform them that thanks to Montagu's archives, he was eventually identified as a gardener named Glyndwr Michael, and that there is now an inscription in Huelva acknowledging that he served in the Second World War as Major William Martin ("A Glitzy Finale").

== Production history ==
=== Off-West End (2019–2022) ===
The musical premiered at the New Diorama Theatre on 14 May 2019 for a run until 15 June. The cast featured writers Natasha Hodgson, David Cumming and Zoë Roberts with Jak Malone and Rory Furey-King.

Following the New Diorama run, the musical opened at the Southwark Playhouse with Claire-Marie Hall replacing Rory Furey-King on The Little stage from 4 to 11 January 2020. A run was scheduled at Southwark Playhouse's The Large stage from 14 to 23 May 2020, however due to the COVID-19 pandemic it was postponed. The run eventually began on 23 July 2021, where it was originally due to run until 7 August, however due to popular demand it was extended to 18 September. The musical ran for a final time at Southwark Playhouse from 14 January to 19 February 2022.

The musical's final Off-West End run opened at the Riverside Studios from 28 April to 23 July 2022. For the Riverside Studios run, Seán Carey temporarily replaced David Cumming, who broke his collarbone 10 days before opening; he returned on 18 June 2022.

=== West End (2023–present) ===
Following the success of the Off-West End productions, the musical transferred to London's West End beginning previews on 29 March 2023 at the Fortune Theatre. Originally scheduled to close after 9 July 2023, the production has been extended multiple times after receiving favourable reviews from audiences and critics. Upon departure of 4 of the original cast members in May 2024, former understudies Seán Carey and Christian Andrews were promoted to principal roles, and Emily Barber and Chloe Hart joined as "Ewen Montagu & Others" and "Johnny Bevan & Others" respectively, with Claire-Marie Hall staying on as "Jean Leslie & Others". Geri Allen and Holly Sumpton continued on as understudies with George Jennings and Jonty Peach completing the understudy team. The cast were joined by Madeleine Jackson-Smith as "Jean Leslie & Others" in December 2024 upon Claire-Marie Hall's imminent departure to Broadway to join the original cast members there. The show will play until at least 20 February 2027, marking its 18th extension. As of May 2025, it is the best received show in the West End, having received 88 five-star reviews.

=== Broadway (2025–present) ===
The musical transferred to Broadway in 2025 for an originally slated 16-week limited run. Previews began on 15 February at The Golden Theatre and officially opened on 20 March to generally positive reviews. The original London cast reprised their roles for the Broadway production. Days after its first preview, the show announced an extended run due to popular demand, and subsequently extended multiple times, into July 2026. An eleventh extension, announced in October 2026, took the run to 25 April 2027.

It was reported that certain musical numbers and lines seemed to resonate more strongly with the New York City audience due to timing and the American political context, such as the line: "If people like us just blindly follow orders, the fascists won't need to bash the door down. They'll have already won."

Following high audience demand to attend the final performance of the original Broadway cast, an additional show was added for the evening of their originally scheduled February 22, 2026 closing matinee. Due to severe winter weather preventing nearly all Broadway shows from performing as scheduled, this performance was cancelled and substituted with a free Instagram Live concert performance at the Laurie Beechman Theatre. Despite the cancelled final performance, Operation Mincemeat hit its highest weekly box office gross of the run up until that point.

Upon the departure of the original British cast in February 2026, former understudies Jessi Kirtley, Brandon Contreras, and Amanda Jill Robinson were promoted to principal roles, and Jeff Kready and Julia Knitel joined in the roles of "Hester Leggatt & Others" and "Ewen Montagu & Others" respectively. Gerianne Pérez and Sam Hartley continued on as understudies, and Robert Ariza, Lexi Rabadi, and Allison Guinn rounded out the understudy cast.

=== World tour (2026) ===
In May 2025, it was announced that the musical would embark on a world tour, beginning with an extended 40-week stay in the UK, before heading globally to the US, Australia, Canada, China, Mexico and New Zealand. The tour began on 16 February 2026 at The Lowry, Salford. The cast for the UK tour includes Charlotte Hanna-Williams, Seán Carey, Christian Andrews and Holly Sumpton returning from the West End cast with Jamie-Rose Monk, Katy Ellis, Georgia Hagen, Jordan Pearson and Morgan Phillips.

In September 2026 the UK leg was extended by a further 36 weeks into 2027, adding Belfast and Dublin to the itinerary along with Dartford, Blackpool and Leicester and a return to The Lowry; the first leg was to finish on 28 November 2026, with the second beginning the following February. The North American leg opened on 20 September 2026 at the Providence Performing Arts Center in Rhode Island. In October 2026 the producers announced that the tour would reach Australia the following year, with the musical's Australian premiere at the Comedy Theatre in Melbourne in September 2027.

== Roles and casts ==
The five members of the principal cast each play multiple roles, often gender-swapped.

Character	Off-West End		West End	Broadway	UK tour	US tour
Character	2019	2020–2022	2023	2025	2026	
Ewen Montagu & Others	Natasha Hodgson	Natasha Hodgson	Natasha Hodgson	Natasha Hodgson	Holly Sumpton	Katie Kleiger
Charles Cholmondeley & Others	David Cumming	David Cumming	David Cumming	David Cumming	Seán Carey	Jake Bentley Young
Johnny Bevan & Others	Zoë Roberts	Zoë Roberts	Zoë Roberts	Zoë Roberts	Jamie-Rose Monk	Mariah Copeland
Hester Leggatt & Others	Jak Malone	Jak Malone	Jak Malone	Jak Malone	Christian Andrews	Luke Antony Neville
Jean Leslie & Others	Rory Furey-King	Claire-Marie Hall	Claire-Marie Hall	Claire-Marie Hall	Charlotte Hanna-Williams	Erin Ramirez

=== Notable replacements ===
==== West End ====
- Ewen Montagu & Others: Emily Barber, Alex Young

==== Broadway ====
- Ewen Montagu & Others: Julia Knitel
- Charles Cholmondeley & Others: Brandon Contreras
- Hester Leggatt & Others: Jeff Kready
- Jean Leslie & Others: Jessi Kirtley

== Musical numbers ==
Act I

- "Born to Lead" – Montagu & Company
- "God That's Brilliant" – Company
- "Dead in the Water" – Cholmondeley
- "Dead in the Water (Reprise)" – Cholmondeley†
- "All the Ladies" – Jean & Company
- "The Pitch" – Montagu, Cholmondeley & Jean
- "Born to Lead (Reprise)" – Montagu, Cholmondeley & Jean†
- "Making a Man" – Company
- "Love is a Bird" – Cholmondeley & Jean†
- "Dear Bill" – Hester
- "Sail on, Boys" – Company
- "Just for Tonight" – Montagu & Company

Act II

- "Das Übermensch" – Company
- "Bevan's Update" – Bevan, Cholmondeley & Montagu
- "The Ballad of Willie Watkins" – Willie & Company
- "Spilsbury Reprise" – Spilsbury & Company
- "I Call Abort" – Bevan†
- "Haselden's Got a Good Feeling" – Haselden & Cholmondeley†
- "Useful" – Hester & Jean
- "Act as If" – Company
- "Did We Do It?" -- Company
- "A Glitzy Finale" – Company

Keys

- † Not included on the cast recording.

=== Cast recording ===
The original West End cast recording for Operation Mincemeat was released on 12 May 2023, on streaming platforms and physically on CD and vinyl. It was released by Sony Music and produced by Steve Sidwell. A live recording of Jak Malone's 'Dear Bill' at the Fortune Theatre was also released.

== Critical reception ==
The show has received significant critical acclaim in the West End. In his five star review for The Stage, Tim Bano called it "A brilliant spy thriller, a brilliant comedy, and a brilliant musical all rolled into one, it is exhilarating to see it hit the West End." On Broadway, the show has received generally positive reviews. Frank Rizzo, in his review for Variety, applauded the show for its "comic madness and theatrical joy." Shania Russell from Entertainment Weekly graded the show an A and called it "An irresistible musical farce that brings British boldness and belly laughs to Broadway" and also said that the show is an "undeniable success". Greg Evans of Deadline praised the show exclaiming "Mincemeat is a triumphant blend of slapstick, farce, intricate plotting, deceptively simple characterizations, terrific music and deliciously energetic performances."

== Awards and nominations ==
=== Off-West End production ===
Year	Award	Category	Nominee	Result
2019	Stage Debut Awards	Best Composer/Lyricist	David Cumming, Felix Hagan, Natasha Hodgson and Zoë Roberts	Won
2019	The Offies	Best New Musical		Nominated
2019	The Offies	Best Company Ensemble		Won
2019	The Offies	Best Set Design	Helen Coyston	Nominated
2019	The Offies	Best Musical Director	Felix Hagan	Nominated
2019	The Offies	Best Sound Design	Dan Balfour	Nominated
2022	West End Wilma Awards	Best Off-West End Show		Nominated
2022	West End Wilma Awards	Best Performer in an Off-West End Show	Jak Malone	Nominated
2023	The Offies	Best Musical		Won
2023	The Offies	Best Performance Ensemble		Nominated
2023	The Offies	Best Costume Design	Helen Coyston	Nominated

=== West End production ===
Year	Award	Category	Nominee	Result
2023	Stage Debut Awards	Best Creative West End Debut	David Cumming, Felix Hagan, Natasha Hodgson and Zoë Roberts	Nominated
2023	Stage Debut Awards	Best Creative West End Debut	Joe Bunker	Nominated
2023	West End Wilma Awards	Best West End Show		Won
2023	West End Wilma Awards	Rising Star	Jak Malone	Won
2023	West End Wilma Awards	Best Performer in a West End Show	Natasha Hodgson	Nominated
2023	West End Wilma Awards	Best Performer in a West End Show	Jak Malone	Nominated
2023	West End Wilma Awards	Best Understudy	Holly Sumpton	Won
2024	WhatsOnStage Awards	Best New Musical		Won
2024	WhatsOnStage Awards	Best Performer in a Musical	Natasha Hodgson	Nominated
2024	WhatsOnStage Awards	Best Supporting Performer in a Musical	Jak Malone	Nominated
2024	WhatsOnStage Awards	Best Graphic Design	Bob King Creative	Nominated
2024	Laurence Olivier Awards	Best New Musical	David Cumming, Felix Hagan, Natasha Hodgson and Zoë Roberts (music, lyrics, and book)	Won
2024	Laurence Olivier Awards	Best Actor in a Musical	David Cumming	Nominated
2024	Laurence Olivier Awards	Best Actress in a Musical	Natasha Hodgson	Nominated
2024	Laurence Olivier Awards	Best Actor in a Supporting Role in a Musical	Jak Malone	Won
2024	Laurence Olivier Awards	Best Actress in a Supporting Role in a Musical	Zoë Roberts	Nominated
2024	Laurence Olivier Awards	Outstanding Musical Contribution	Steve Sidwell (orchestrations), Joe Bunker (musical direction)	Nominated
2025	West End Wilma Awards	Best Understudy	Geri Allen	Won

=== Broadway production ===
Year	Award	Category	Nominee	Result
2025	Drama League Awards	Outstanding Production of a Musical		Nominated
2025	Drama League Awards	Outstanding Direction of a Musical	Robert Hastie	Nominated
2025	Drama League Awards	Distinguished Performance	Jak Malone	Nominated
2025	Outer Critics Circle Awards	Outstanding New Broadway Musical		Nominated
2025	Outer Critics Circle Awards	Outstanding Featured Performer in a Broadway Musical	Jak Malone	Won
2025	Outer Critics Circle Awards	Book of a Musical	David Cumming, Felix Hagan, Natasha Hodgson, and Zoë Roberts	Nominated
2025	Outer Critics Circle Awards	Outstanding New Score	David Cumming, Felix Hagan, Natasha Hodgson, and Zoë Roberts	Nominated
2025	Outer Critics Circle Awards	Outstanding Direction of a Musical	Robert Hastie	Nominated
2025	Outer Critics Circle Awards	Outstanding Choreography	Jenny Arnold	Nominated
2025	Drama Desk Awards	Outstanding Featured Performance in a Musical	Jak Malone	Won
2025	Drama Desk Awards	Outstanding Lyrics	David Cumming, Felix Hagan, Natasha Hodgson, and Zoë Roberts	Nominated
2025	Drama Desk Awards	Outstanding Book of a Musical	David Cumming, Felix Hagan, Natasha Hodgson, and Zoë Roberts	Nominated
2025	Tony Awards	Best Musical		Nominated
2025	Tony Awards	Best Performance by an Actor in a Featured Role in a Musical	Jak Malone	Won
2025	Tony Awards	Best Original Score (Music and/or Lyrics) Written for the Theatre	David Cumming, Felix Hagan, Natasha Hodgson and Zoë Roberts	Nominated
2025	Tony Awards	Best Book of a Musical	David Cumming, Felix Hagan, Natasha Hodgson and Zoë Roberts	Nominated
2025	Dorian Awards	Outstanding Broadway Musical		Nominated
2025	Dorian Awards	Outstanding Featured Performance in a Broadway Musical	Jak Malone	Won

== Historical research and commemoration ==
In real life, the false love letters for Operation Mincemeat may or may not have been written by Hester Leggatt; according to Ben Macintyre, they were written by Leggatt, but Denis Smyth identifies the author as Paddy Bennett, later Lady Ridsdale, who claimed she had written them. In any case, a group of fans of the musical, known as Mincefluencers, were inspired to research into the real life of Leggatt, as little was known about her. They managed to get in contact with MI5 and were able to find out some key information about Leggatt. They discovered that her surname was spelled Leggatt rather than Leggett, and that she worked for Osbert Sitwell in the 1930s, for MI5 during the Second World War and later for the British Council. On 11 December 2023, a plaque was installed at the Fortune Theatre in commemoration of Leggatt.

== Licensing ==
On 4 April 2024, Concord Theatricals announced that they secured from Avalon exclusive worldwide secondary licensing rights to the musical with a release time to be announced at a later date.

In September 2026 the musical was licensed to schools in an expanded-cast edition.
