= Martin Benson (artistic director) =

American artistic director (1937–2024)

- Born: March 15, 1937; Oakland, California, U.S.
- Died: November 30, 2024 (aged 87); Huntington Beach, California, U.S.
- Occupation: Artistic director

Martin Benson (March 15, 1937 – November 30, 2024) was an American artistic director. He was awarded the Regional Theatre Tony Award at the 42nd Tony Awards.

Benson died on November 30, 2024 in Huntington Beach, California, at the age of 87.
