= David Cumming (actor) =

British stage actor born 1987

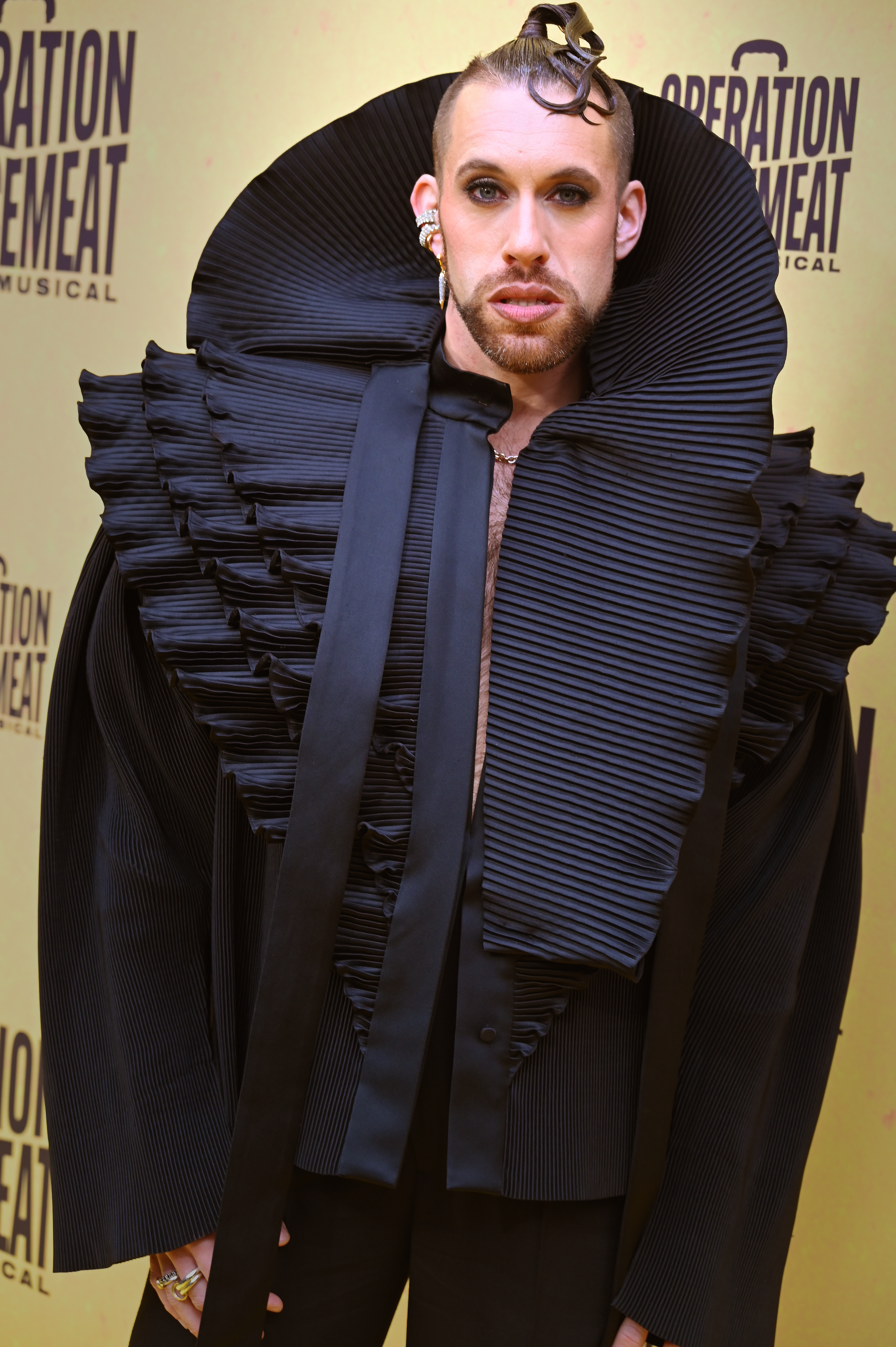
- Cumming in 2025
- Born: 16 January 1987 (age 39); Newcastle upon Tyne
- Occupations: Actor, writer

David Cumming (born 16 January 1987) is a British writer and actor best known for the musical Operation Mincemeat, which is currently running on both the West End and Broadway.

== Early life and education ==
Cumming was born in Newcastle upon Tyne. His mother was born in Scotland and his father was a Pakistani immigrant. He attended the University of Warwick, where he studied Theatre and Performance Studies.

== Career ==
Cumming co-founded the comedy group Kill the Beast in 2012 alongside Natasha Hodgson, Zoë Roberts, Ollie Jones, and Clem Garritty. Kill the Beast produced four stage productions, including The Boy Who Kicked Pigs (2013), He Had Hairy Hands (2014), Don't Wake The Damp (2016), and Director's Cut (2019).

Hodgson, Cumming, and Roberts, with newcomer Felix Hagan, split off the group in 2017 to form SpitLip with the intention of creating "big dumb musicals." SpitLip's first musical, Operation Mincemeat, eventually transferred to the West End and later Broadway, winning the 2024 Laurence Olivier Award for Best New Musical. He also received three Tony Award nominations for his creative work on the show for Best Musical, Best Book of a Musical & Best Original Score. In addition to co-writing and co-composing the musical, Cumming also originated the role of "Charles Cholmondeley & Others," which he has played in every production of the show and was nominated for the Laurence Olivier Award for Best Actor in a Musical for his performance.

In 2018, Cumming and Conrad Murray, in collaboration with Battersea Arts Centre's Beatbox Academy, co-directed the critically acclaimed production of Frankenstein: How to Make a Monster. The production was later adapted for television by BBC Four.

Cumming joined drag performance group Sink the Pink for two holiday-themed shows including How to Catch a Krampus in 2018 and Escape From Trash Planet in 2019. In 2021, Cumming and Sink the Pink collaborator Ginger Johnson wrote and directed Dog Show, a canine-themed queer cabaret which ran at the Pleasance for a month.

In 2023, Cumming took up the role of Guest Artistic Director at the King's Head Theatre, where he presented "QUEER FUTURES: A FESTIVAL OF THE NOW WHICH IS YET TO COME." He returned in 2024 to join the cast of Outings, an anthology of coming out stories performed as a fundraiser for the LGBTQ+ Switchboard charity.

== Personal life ==
One week before Operation Mincemeat premiered at Riverside Studios, Cumming broke his collarbone in a biking accident. His replacement in the role of Charles Cholmondeley, Seán Carey, had to learn the entire musical in a week.

Cumming is queer.

== See also ==
- List of British actors
