= Charles Cholmondeley (intelligence officer) =

British intelligence officer with a leading role in Operation Mincemeat

Flight Lieutenant Charles Cholmondeley MBE
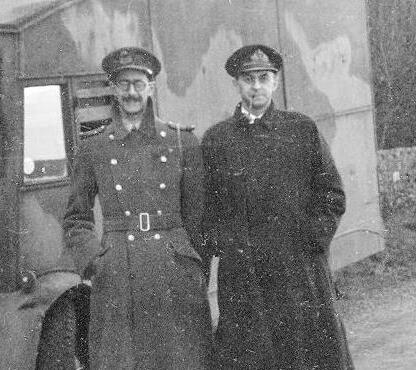
- Cholmondeley (left) and Ewen Montagu in 1943
- Born: 27 January 1917
- Died: 15 June 1982 (aged 65)
- Education: University of Oxford
- Spouse: Alison (m. 1964)
- Children: 3
- Military career
- Allegiance: United Kingdom
- Branch: Royal Air Force Volunteer Reserve; Military Intelligence, Section 5
- Service years: 1939–1952

Flight Lieutenant Charles Christopher Cholmondeley (Note: Pronounced (/ˈtʃʌmli/ CHUM-lee)) MBE (27 January 1917 – 15 June 1982) was a British intelligence officer known for his leading role in Operation Mincemeat, a critical military deception operation which misdirected German forces' attention away from the Allied invasion of Sicily in Operation Husky.

== Early life and education ==
Cholmondeley was born on 27 January 1917 in O'Halloran Hill, South Australia, the son of Richard Vernon Cholmondeley and Hilda Georgina Cholmondeley (née Naylor). His older sister, Victoria Milicent Cholmondeley, would go on to become a pilot with the Air Transport Auxiliary.

He attended Canford School in Dorset, where he went on naturalist expeditions with the Public Schools Exploring Society. Cholmondeley studied geography at the University of Oxford.

== Military service ==
After joining the Officers' Training Corps, he unsuccessfully applied to the Sudan Service, and was later commissioned pilot officer in November 1939. However, he had such poor eyesight that he never was allowed to actually fly a plane.

During the Second World War he served as a flight lieutenant in the Royal Air Force Volunteer Reserve (RAFVR), seconded to MI5, Britain's domestic counter-intelligence and security service. He had been appointed as the secretary of the Twenty Committee, a small inter-service, inter-departmental intelligence team in charge of double agents.

In November 1942, the Twenty Committee turned down Cholmondeley's Operation Mincemeat plan as being unworkable, but thought there may have been some potential in the idea. As there was a naval connection to the plan, Ewen Montagu, the naval representative, was assigned to work with Cholmondeley to develop the plan further. As part of his duties Montagu had been briefed on the need for deception operations to aid the Allied war aims in a forthcoming invasion operation in the Mediterranean.

He was awarded the Member of the Most Excellent Order of the British Empire in 1944.

In October 1945, Cholmondeley moved to the Middle East, where he was put to work exterminating locusts as part of the 'Middle East Anti-Locust Unit.' In 1949, he transferred to the International Council for the Control of the Red Locust in Rhodesia. Historian Ben Macintyre, author of the book Operation Mincemeat, speculated that this was a cover story for a more classified operation, as he was still employed by the British Secret Service during this time.

In 1950, Cholmondeley signed up for a five-year intelligence assignment with the Royal Air Force. He travelled to Malaya to coordinate deception against the Malayan National Liberation Army during the Malayan Emergency. However, he only completed two years of this assignment.

== Later life and death ==
Cholmondeley left MI5 in 1952 at the age of 35, and shortly after he moved to the West Country and started a business selling horticultural equipment.

He eventually married Alison Margaret Gardiner on 4 July 1964. The pair had three children: Richard (d. 1987), Elizabeth and Thomas.

He remained secretive about his intelligence work for the rest of his life.

"He would not give information to anyone who did not 'need to know.' Infuriatingly I found this included me."

— Alison Cholmondeley, about her husband

Cholmondeley died 15 June 1982; Montagu wrote an obituary that was published in The Times.

"The Hon Ewen E. S. Montagu writes:

‘May I place on record, and pay tribute to, the invaluable work during the war of Charles Cholmondeley MBE, whose death occurred on June 15 - work which, through circumstances and his innate modesty is not adequately known.

Charles was a representative of the RAF on the Double Cross Committee where his fertile mind and mastery of detail was of immense benefit to the successful deception of the enemy. He was most successful in divising material with which to build up the confidence which the Germans placed in the double-agents and he played an especially leading role in two of the most successful deception plans.

One was to cause the Germans to misdirect their V-weapons, thus saving thousands of lives. The other was Operation MINCEMEAT (The Man Who Never Was) which greatly facilitated our invasion of Sicily; this was founded on one of Charles’s brainwaves and he took one of the greatest parts in its detailed implementation, service which earned him his MBE.

However, circumstances caused him to refuse to be named when the government decided to make the story public. This resulted in him being given the pseudonym ‘George’ in the accounts of the operation until, very recently, his name has been divulged without his consent.

Many citizens of London who survived the V-bombs and many who landed in Sicily owe their lives to Charles Cholmondeley.’"

— Ewen Montagu, The Times

== In popular culture ==
- In the 2021 British war drama Operation Mincemeat, Cholmondeley is played by Matthew Macfadyen.
- Cholmondeley was originally portrayed by David Cumming in the stage musical Operation Mincemeat, both on the West End (2023-2024) and on Broadway from (2025-2026) . As of 2027, the fictionalized musical version of Cholmondeley is still being performed on the West End, on Broadway, and on multiple national tours.
