= Zoë Roberts =

21st century British writer and actress

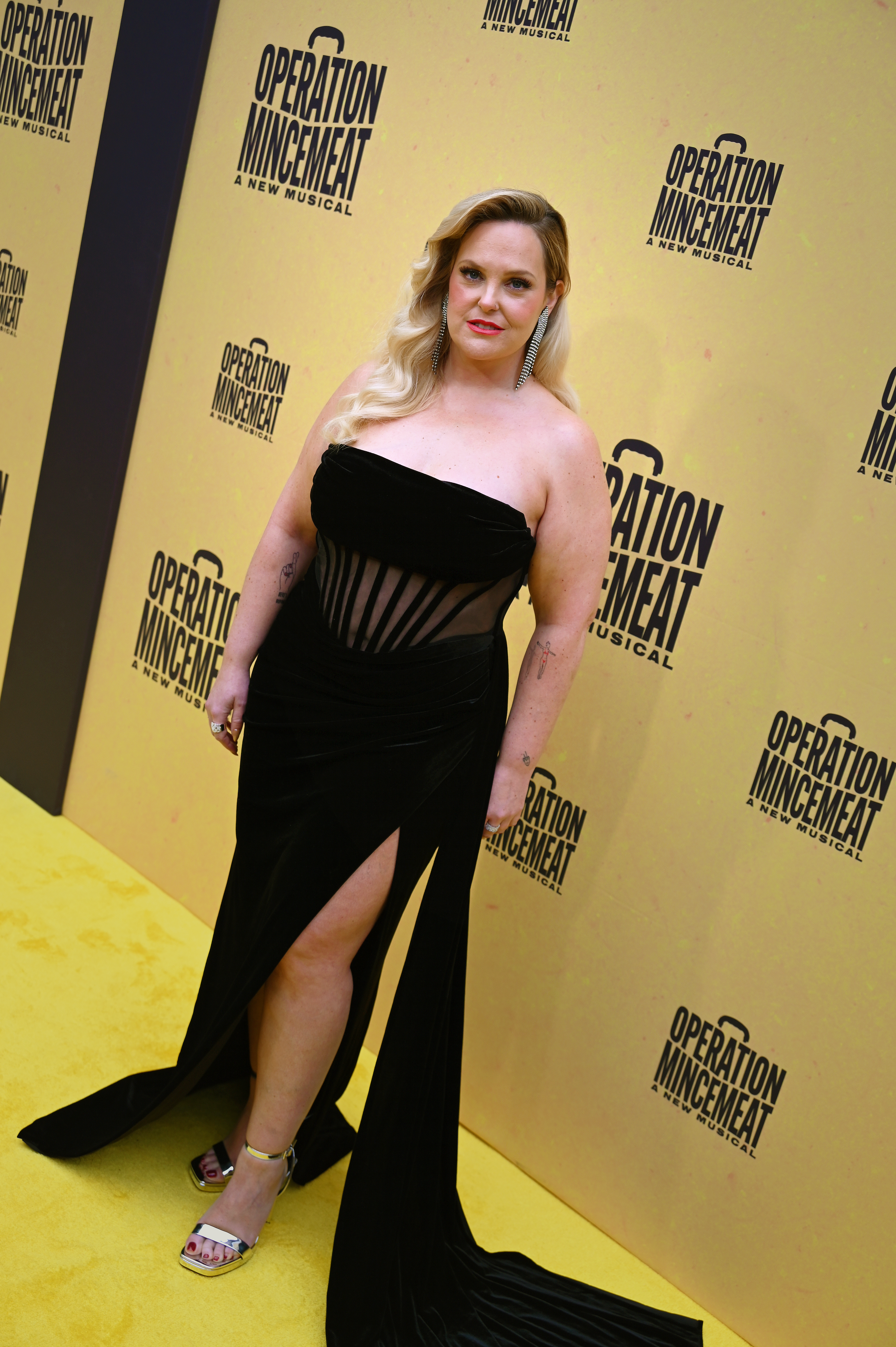
- Roberts at the Broadway Opening Night of Operation Mincemeat in 2025
- Born: 23 November 1985 (age 40)
- Education: University of Warwick
- Occupations: Actor, writer
- Known for: Operation Mincemeat (musical)

Zoë Roberts (born 23 November 1985) is a British writer and stage actress best known for her work with the comedy groups Kill The Beast and SpitLip. She co-wrote and co-starred in the musical Operation Mincemeat, which won the 2024 Laurence Olivier Award for Best New Musical and received a Tony Award nomination for Best Musical.

She additionally received two Tony Award nominations for her creative work on the show for Best Book of a Musical & Best Original Score and a nomination for the Laurence Olivier Award for Best Actress in a Supporting Role in a Musical for her performance in the show.

== Early life and education ==
Roberts attended the University of Warwick.

== Career ==
Roberts co-founded the comedy group Kill the Beast in 2012 alongside Natasha Hodgson, David Cumming, Ollie Jones, and Clem Garritty. Kill the Beast produced four stage productions, including The Boy Who Kicked Pigs (2013), He Had Hairy Hands (2014), Don't Wake The Damp (2016), and Director's Cut (2019). With Kill the Beast, Roberts co-wrote and performed in the podcasts Who Exploded Vivien Stone and Eglantine Whitechapel: Supernatural Detective.

Hodgson, Cumming, and Roberts, with newcomer Felix Hagan, split off the group in 2017 to form SpitLip with the intention of creating "big dumb musicals." SpitLip's first musical, Operation Mincemeat, eventually transferred to the West End and later Broadway, winning the 2024 Laurence Olivier Award for Best New Musical. The show also received a Tony Award nomination for Best Musical and Roberts received an additional two Tony Award nominations for her creative work on the show for Best Book of a Musical & Best Original Score.

In addition to co-writing and co-composing Operation Mincemeat, Roberts originated the role of "Johnny Bevan & Others." She was nominated for the 2024 Laurence Olivier Award for Best Actress in a Supporting Role in a Musical, though the award ultimately went to Amy Trigg for The Little Big Things.
