= Steven Holmes (curator) =

Canadian curator (born 1965)

Steven Holmes (born 1965) is a Canadian curator based in Hartford, Connecticut.

== Biography ==
He was born in Cobourg, Ontario, Canada, and educated at The University of Toronto (Bachelor of Arts, Religion and History), Harvard University (Master of Theological Studies, Religion and Culture) and the Nova Scotia College of Art and Design (Master of Fine Arts, Studio).

As an artist, Holmes worked as a photographer and briefly exhibited work in several Canadian venues, including Gallery 44 in Toronto, and Anna Leonowens Gallery in Halifax.

== Curatorial work ==
Steven Holmes is curator of The Cartin Collection in Hartford, Connecticut (2005–present) where he oversees a collection of 2,000 objects. The collection includes post war and contemporary art, as well as early printed books and incunabula, Medieval illuminated manuscripts, and early Flemish masterpieces.

From 2009 to 2012, Holmes was adjunct curator at The Bass Museum of Art in Miami. There, he oversaw the development of the museum's collection policy and collection planning process, and conceived of and curated numerous exhibitions, including:

- Seen in the Mirror: Things from the Cartin Collection (2023) -- At David Zwirner Galleries. With/featuring: Josef Albers, Giorgio Morandi, Joseph Cornell, Forrest Bess, Sol LeWitt, Charles LeDray, and Rembrandt van Rijn.
- The Cave of Forgotten Dreams (2017) -- At Joseloff Gallery at the University of Hartford. With/featuring: Marina Abramoviç, Stanley Brouwn, Jennifer Reifsneider, Natalie Majaba Waldburger, and Tracey Emin.
- The Endless Renaissance (2012) – Six Projects, co-curated with Silvia Karman Cubiná. Eija-Liisa Ahtila, Barry X Ball, Walead Beshty, Hans-Peter Feldman, Ged Quinn, Araya Rasdjarmrearnsook.
- Charles Ledray (2012) – Bass Museum Catalogue.
- An Invitation to Look: Selections from the Permanent Collection (2011) – Sandro Botticelli, Hyacinthe Rigaud, John Hoppner, Sir Thomas Lawrence, Giovanni Mazone, Master of the Borghese Tondo, Rembrandt van Rijn, Benjamin West and others.
- Human Rites (2010) – Marina Abramović, El Anatsui, John Beech, Christian Boltanski, Mark Dion, Thomas Hirschhorn, Allan McCollum, Priscilla Monge, Rirkrit Tiravanija, César Trasobares, Ai Wei-Wei, Erwim Wurm, Massimo Vitalli, Subodh Gupta, Shirin Neshat, Rafael Lozano-Hemmer, Sophie Calle, and Paolo Canevara.
- The Endless Renaissance (2009) – Joseph Beuys, Joe Coleman, Gregory Crewdson, Eugène Delacroix, Thierry Delva, Wim Delvoye, Nicole Eisenman, Peter Friedl, Francisco de Goya, John Hoppner, Pieter Hugo, Byron Kim. Charles LeDray, Sol Le Witt, Kelly Mark, Jonathan Monk, Martin Puryear, Sharron Quasius, Hyacinthe Rigaud, Bert Rodriguez, Peter Paul Rubens, Chemi Rosado Seijo, Thomas Struth, Huang Yongping.

Holmes was the director of visual arts and public programming at Real Art Ways in Hartford from 2000 – 2005. There, he served as managing director of all visual arts and public programming, co-wrote grants, represented the organization in external affairs, curated exhibitions, and directed education and outreach staff.

Additionally, Holmes has curated exhibitions for The Palais de Tokyo in Paris, the KW Institute for Contemporary Art in Berlin, The Wadsworth Athenaeum Museum of Art in Hartford and the Boston Center for the Arts, working with more than 200 artists including Charles Ledray, Kehinde Wiley, The Atlas Group / Walid Ra’ad, Kate Gilmore, Harrell Fletcher, Paul Chan, Joe Amrhein, Chris Doyle and Sol LeWitt.

Holmes conceived of and worked with Creative Time to mount the multi-city performance of Fairytale – 1001 Chairs for Ai Weiwei. Simultaneous performances took place in Hong Kong, Berlin, Paris, Athens, Helsinki, Toronto, New York, Chicago, LA, Madrid, Brussels, Stockholm and twenty other cities around the world. Holmes was a founding member of The Khyber Arts Society in Halifax, now a Canadian National Exhibition Center. Holmes has published in the areas of critical theory and art criticism.

In 2008, Holmes edited FESTSCHRIFT, with essays by Carlos Basualdo, Nicholas Baume, and James Rondeau.

Holmes has been a visiting critic for Skowhegan, Yale School of Art, Art Omi, University of Connecticut, Nova Scotia College of Art and Design, University of Lethbridge and Hartford Art School. Projects have been reviewed in The New York Times, Art in America, Art Forum, The New Yorker Magazine, artnet, artUS, Art News, Tema Celeste, Flash Art International and Art New England. He has appeared on TV and Radio in the United States and Europe to speak about contemporary art, and art and social change, including NBC Miami, BBC5 London, CBC Halifax and Toronto, and Connecticut Public Radio.

== Selected publications ==
- "Charles Ledray", Bass Museum of Art, 2013.
- "I Didn't Know They Were Canadian", in Oh Canada, MIT Press, 2012.
- "Hartford Arts Hurt By Loss Of Curators" in Hartford Courant, Op Ed, September 26, 2010
- "Quote, Endquote, Repeat: All Art is Contemporary", exhibition catalogue for The Endless Renaissance, Bass Museum of Art, 2009.
- Festschrift: Selections from a Collection. Leo Press, Hartford, 2008.
- "Joe Coleman Moderne Frõmmigkeit" Checkpoint. May–August 2007.
- "Joe Coleman's Modern Devotion". Palais de Tokyo Magazine. March 2007.
- None of the Above, Real Art Ways, 2005 ISBN 0-9717859-1-0
- "Charged Image vs. a University in Retreat". The Hartford Courant. 3 October 2004.
- Acquiring Taste: Work from the Collections of Janice and Mickey Cartin, Robinson and Nancy Grover, Peter Hirschl and Lisa Silvestri, and the LeWitt Collection, Real Art Ways, 2002. ISBN 0-9717859-0-2
- "Documentary Sculpture", Exhibition Catalogue, Real Art Ways, 2002
- "BOXWORKS: Sculpture by Thierry Delva", Dalhousie University Art Gallery, 1996.
- "The Word is Made Flesh, The Flesh is Made Word: Michel Foucault and His Gaze" in Rewire, Spring 1993.
- 'Photography as Theological Discourse" in the Harvard Divinity Bulletin, Vol. 21, No. 4, (1992).
