= Bass Museum =

Art museum in Miami Beach, Florida

Coordinates: 25.7973966°N 80.1299536°W

The Bass
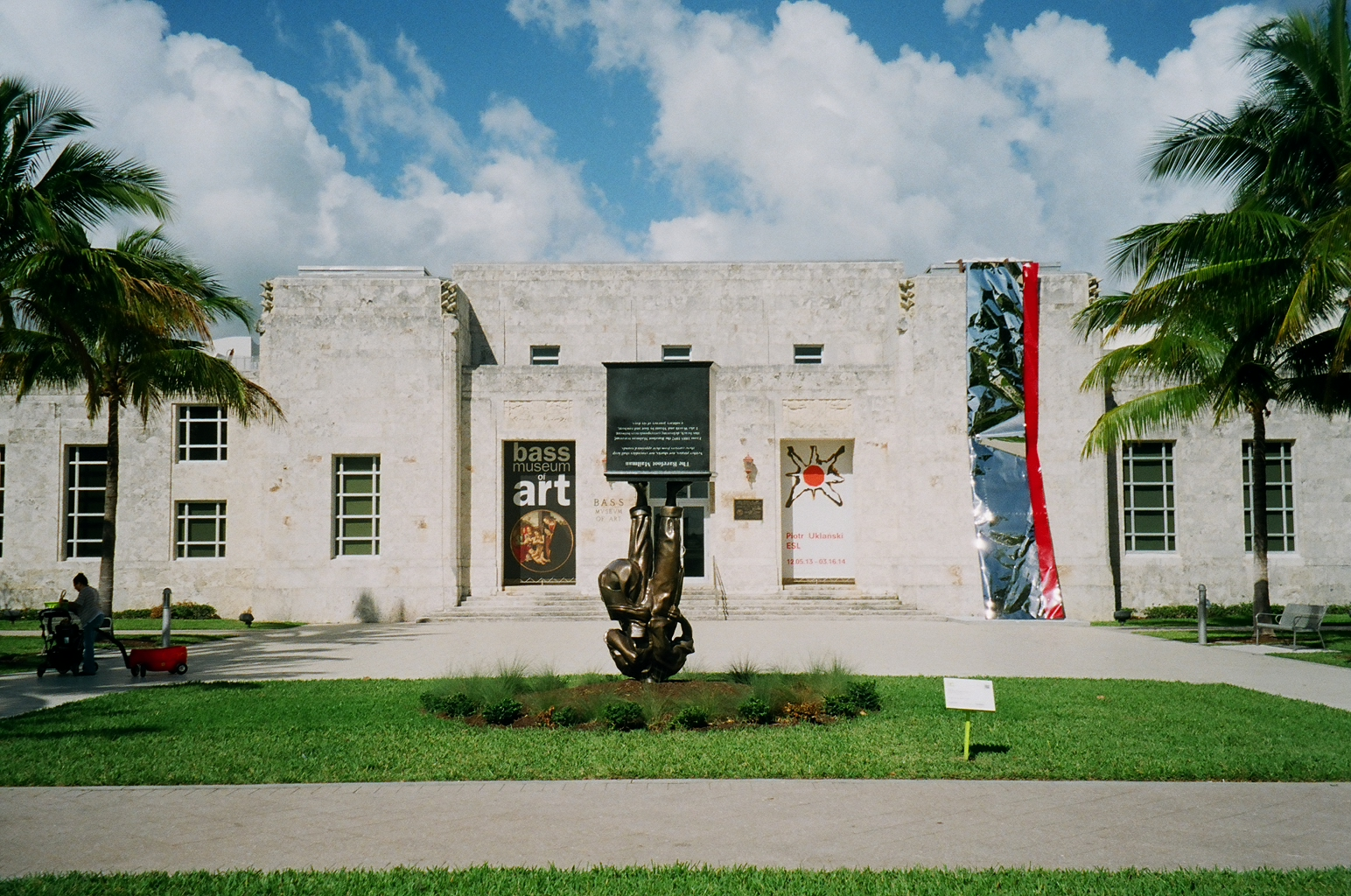
- The Bass Museum of Art front façade, January 2015
- Established: 1963
- Location: Miami Beach, Florida, United States
- Type: Art museum
- Director: Silvia Karman Cubiñá
- Public transit access: Metrobus: 14, 36, 79, 100, 150; Collins Ave at 22 Street; Miami Beach Trolley: Middle Beach Loop, Collins Express, South Beach Loop
- Website: www.thebass.org

The Bass Museum of Art is a contemporary art museum located in Miami Beach, Florida. The Bass Museum of Art was founded in 1963 and opened in 1964.

== History ==
=== Early years ===
John Bass (1891–1978) and Johanna Redlich (m. February 21, 1921) were Jewish-immigrants from Vienna, Austria who resided in Miami Beach. As President of the Fajardo Sugar Company of Puerto Rico, John Bass was also an amateur journalist, artist (namely painting and etching) and composer of published music. Mr. Bass collected both fine art and cultural artifacts, including a sizeable manuscript collection that now lives in the Carnegie Hall Archives. In 1963, the couple bequeathed a collection of more than 500 works, including Old Master paintings, textiles and sculptures to the City of Miami Beach, under the agreement that a Bass Museum of Art would remain open to the public in perpetuity.

The museum opened its doors on April 7, 1964; at the time, it was the only municipally operated art gallery in South Florida. The city spent $160,000 to renovate the structure, which includes what was formerly the Miami Beach Public Library. John Bass directed the museum from its founding until his death in 1978.

=== Expansions ===
In 1980, art historian Diane Camber was hired as Executive Director of the museum, following a time of turmoil after concerns were raised over attributions in the collection. Following a series of published reports casting doubts upon the authenticity of many of the pieces in the collection of paintings, a group of citizens asked the Art Dealers Association early in 1969 for an independent appraisal. In 1973, the Miami Beach City Council temporarily closed the Museum before reopening in January 1980.

For the next thirty years, Camber worked to obtain AAM accreditation, produce scholarly exhibitions and successfully run a capital campaign for a building expansion, developing the museum into a significant cultural institution. Renovations took place in 2001, and a 1,500 m^{2} (16,000 sq ft) expansion designed by Arata Isozaki was inaugurated with the exhibition Globe Miami Island in 2002.

In 2013, the Bass announced a $7.5 million grant from the City of Miami Beach to begin a second phase of transformation and expansion. The museum closed for construction in May 2015 and opened on October 29, 2017. The $12 million expansion designed by David Gauld increased the programmable space by almost 50 percent, adding four new galleries of 380 m^{2} (4,100 sq ft); Isozaki served as design consultant. As part of a rebranding, the Bass removed "Museum of Art" from its name. In December 2017, the museum received a $500,000 donation from Riccardo and Tatyana Silva to support the institution's endowment fund. Following this contribution, the Bass named a first-floor gallery the "Riccardo and Tatyana Silva Gallery".

In 2022, the Bass received $20.1 million in city-issued funds as part of a municipal general obligation bond that voters authorized in the US midterm elections; it will be used to add a new wing to the museum's building for additional exhibition space.

== Exhibitions ==
In 2003, the Bass presented a traveling exhibition titled, US DESIGN, 1975–2000, a critical assessment of the work of three generations of American designers during the last 25 years of the 20th century.

Under the leadership of Silvia Karman Cubiñá, Executive Director and Chief Curator since 2009, The Bass has presented such exhibitions as:

- Where Do We Go From Here? Selections from la Coleccion Jumex (2009)
- Isaac Julien: Creative Caribbean Network (2010)
- Erwin Wurm: Beauty Business (2011)
- The Endless Renaissance – Six Solo Artists Projects: Eija-Liisa Ahtila, Barry X Ball, Walead Beshty, Hans-Peter Feldman, Ged Quinn, Araya Rasdjarmrearnsook (2012), co-curated by Cubiná and Steven Holmes
- From Picasso to Koons: The Artist as Jeweler (2013)
- Piotr Uklański: ESL (2013)
- Vanitas: Fashion and Art (2014)
- Gravity and Grace: Monumental Works by El Anatsui (2014)
- GOLD (2014)
- One Way: Peter Marino (2015)
- Ugo Rondinone, good evening beautiful blue (October 29, 2017 – March 25, 2018)
- Mika Rottenberg (December 7, 2017 – April 29, 2018)
- Pascale Marthine Tayou, Beautiful (October 29, 2017 – May 20, 2018)
- Laure Prouvost, They Are Waiting for You (April 27 – September 2, 2018)
- DESTE Fashion Collection, 1 to 8 (April 27 – September 2, 2018)
- Karen Rifas, Deceptive Constructions (May 24 – October 21, 2018)
- Nam June Paik, The Miami Years (October 4, 2023 – August 11, 2024)

== Collection ==
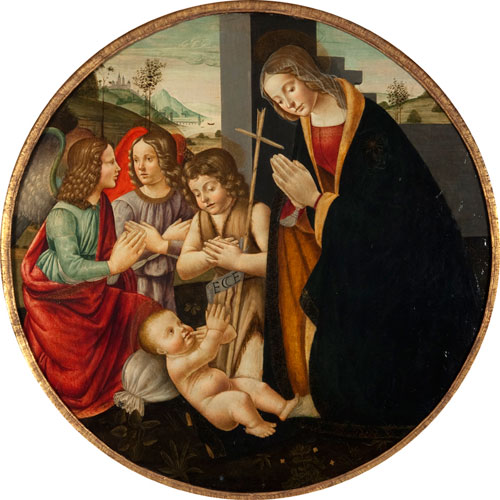
The Madonna Adoring the Christ Child with Angels and the Infant St. John the Baptist, attributed to studio of Domenico Ghirlandaio, in The Bass' permanent collection.

The Bass incorporates its founding collection into a schedule of international contemporary exhibitions. The museum's permanent collection includes European painting and sculpture from the 15th century to present; 7th to 20th-century textiles, tapestries and ecclesiastical vestments and artifacts; 20th and 21st-century North American, Latin American, Asian and Caribbean art; photographs, prints and drawings; and modern and contemporary architecture and design with emphasis on the pre- and postwar design history of Miami Beach. The "Open Storage" gallery is dedicated to displays of the museum's permanent collection, featuring a series of rotating artist projects that present works in dialogue with the collection. Pascale Marthine Tayou served as the first artist intervention in the space with his exhibition Beautiful.

From August 21, 2015 to July 17, 2016, a selection of artworks from the permanent collection were incorporated into an exhibition at the Lowe Art Museum at the University of Miami. Dürer to Rubens: Northern European Art from the Bass Museum included works that represent a range of media—including oil on canvas, tempera on panel, enamel on porcelain, and textiles.

In September 2016, The Bass launched a ten-year initiative to grow the museum's holdings of international contemporary art within the permanent collection. The initiative was celebrated with two inaugural acquisitions of public art: Miami Mountain, 2016 by Ugo Rondinone and Eternity Now, 2015 by Sylvie Fleury. In August 2017, the museum announced its third major purchase towards this initiative with Allora & Calzadilla's Petrified Petrol Pump (Pemex II), 2011.

== Education ==
In 2017, the museum's Creativity Center opened as the largest art museum education facility in Miami-Dade, with three classrooms and various spaces to serve a regular curriculum of multigenerational programs.

== Management ==
=== Finances ===
The Bass has an annual operating budget of around $4.5 million. Aligning with rapid urban development of City of Miami Beach, support from the John L. and James S. Knight Foundation and the success of Art Basel Miami Beach, the museum converted to a 501c3 non-profit corporation.

=== Leadership ===
In 2009, George Lindemann Jr. became President of the Board of Directors and Silvia Karman Cubiñá was appointed as executive director.

Silvia Karman Cubiñá is the Executive Director and Chief Curator of The Bass Museum of Art. As of April 2018, the board members are George Lindemann (President), Lida Rodriguez-Taseff (Parliamentarian), Olga Blavatnik, Criselda Breene, Clara Bullrich, Hugh Bush, Trudy Cejas, Michael Comras, Brian Ehrlich, Gaby Garza, Solomon Genet, Christina Getty, José Ramón González, Sarah Harrelson, Lisa Heiden-Koffler, Naeem Khan, Diane Lieberman, Alice S. Matlick, Jimmy Morales, Thomas C. Murphy, Laura Paresky Gould, Tui Pranich, Alisa Romano, Tatyana Silva, Christine J. Taplin, and Cathy Vedovi.
