= Just Say Yo =

Just Say Yes Volume II: Just Say Yo

Compilation album by Various artists
- Released: August 16, 1988
- Genre: Alternative rock
- Length: 61:02
- Label: Sire/Warner Bros. Records
- Producer: Howie Klein

Various artists chronology
Just Say Yes (1987)	Just Say Yes Volume II: Just Say Yo (1988)	Just Say Yes Volume III: Just Say Mao (1989)

Just Say Yo was Sire Records' Volume 2 of Just Say Yes and was originally released on August 16, 1988, as a winter CD sampler. It contained remixes and non-album tracks of artists on the label, most of which were considered new wave or modern rock.

== Track listing ==
1. Galbi (Coldcut remix) - Ofra Haza
2. Will Never Marry - Morrissey
3. Black Coffee - k.d. lang
4. Behind the Wheel/Route 66 [Mega-Single Mix] - Depeche Mode
5. Bible Dreams - The Wild Swans
6. Chains of Love [Truly in Love with the Marks Bros. Mix] - Erasure
7. Tubular Bells/Pretty Boys and Pretty Girls [Regan's House Me Mix] - Book of Love
8. Hot Dog [12" Remix] - Martini Ranch
9. Mexican Women - Throwing Muses
10. Call Me Blue - A House
11. Inside Out [Live] - The Mighty Lemon Drops
12. What For - James
13. Kingdom Chairs - The Soup Dragons
14. Bacchanal Lady [Extended Remix] - David Rudder

It is volume two in the Just Say Yes series of promotional compilations, of which each title was a variation on the 'Just Say' theme:

- Just Say Yes Volume I: Just Say Yes (1987)
- Just Say Yes Volume III: Just Say Mao (1989)
- Just Say Yes Volume IV: Just Say Da (1990)
- Just Say Yes Volume V: Just Say Anything (1991)
- Just Say Yes Volume VI: Just Say Yesterday (1992)
- Just Say Yes Volume VII: Just Say Roe (1994)
