= Just Say Da =

Just Say Yes Volume IV: Just Say Da

Compilation album by Various artists
- Released: September 4, 1990
- Genre: Alternative rock
- Length: 78:38
- Label: Sire

Various artists chronology
Just Say Yes Volume III: Just Say Mao (1989)	Just Say Yes Volume IV: Just Say Da (1990)	Just Say Yes Volume V: Just Say Anything (1991)

Just Say Da was Sire Records' Volume 4 of Just Say Yes and was originally released on September 4, 1990 as a winter CD sampler. It contained remixes and non-album tracks of artists on the label, most of which were considered new wave or modern rock. This was the first of the 'Just Say' themed albums to carry the Parental Advisory labeling. It was rated four stars by AllMusic.

== Track listing ==
1. Personal Jesus [Kazan Cathedral Mix] - Depeche Mode
2. Drop the Pressure - Merlin
3. Star [The Trafalmadore Mix] - Erasure
4. Wish Me Luck [Karamazov Mix] - Ofra Haza
5. Help Us, Somebody - Chris Thomas
6. Candleland [Second Coming Version] - Ian McCulloch
7. Breathe [Live From the Gulag] - Ministry
8. Girl Tried to Kill Me - Ice-T
9. When the Beatles Hit America - John Wesley Harding
10. Id Parade - Danielle Dax
11. November Spawned a Monster - Morrissey
12. Gang of One - Bradford
13. Maybe for Sure [Tunguska Event 7" Mix] - Debbie Harry
14. Soon - My Bloody Valentine
15. Melting Blue Delicious [St. Petersburg Mix] - Wild Swans
16. Loaded - Primal Scream

It is volume four in the Just Say Yes series of promotional compilations, of which each title was a variation on the 'Just Say' theme:

- Just Say Yes Volume I: Just Say Yes (1987)
- Just Say Yes Volume II: Just Say Yo (1988)
- Just Say Yes Volume III: Just Say Mao (1989)
- Just Say Yes Volume V: Just Say Anything (1991)
- Just Say Yes Volume VI: Just Say Yesterday (1992)
- Just Say Yes Volume VII: Just Say Roe (1994)
