= Alan Wills =

Alan Wills may refer to:

- Alan Wills (archer) (born 1981), British athlete
- Alan Wills (record label founder) (1961–2014), British music executive and musician
