= Native Son (album) =

Studio album by the Judybats
- Released: 1991
- Studio: Dreamland, Hurley, New York
- Genre: Alternative pop
- Length: 45:34
- Label: Sire
- Producer: Richard Gottehrer

The Judybats chronology
Native Son (1991)	Down in the Shacks Where the Satellite Dishes Grow (1992)

Native Son is the first studio album by the American band the Judybats, released in 1991 by Sire Records. The title track peaked at No. 9 on the Billboard Modern Rock Tracks chart. The band supported the album by touring with John Wesley Harding.

== Promotion ==
"She Lives (In a Time of Her Own)" first appeared on Where the Pyramid Meets the Eye: A Tribute to Roky Erickson (1990). "Don't Drop the Baby" later appeared on the Sire Records various artists sampler album Just Say Yes Volume V: Just Say Anything (1991).

Music videos were made for the songs "Native Son", "Don't Drop the Baby", "Daylight", and "She Lives (In a Time of Her Own)".

== Critical reception ==
Professional ratings
Review scores
Source	Rating
AllMusic	2.5/5 stars
Calgary Herald	B+
Chicago Tribune	2.5/4 stars
Entertainment Weekly	B+

The Calgary Herald wrote that "the Judybats strikes a blow for pop music lovers with its debut disc, a shimmering collection of songs". Trouser Press determined that "it's really Jeff Heiskell's remarkable singing and bittersweet lyrics that distinguish the record—'Incognito' provides an elegant précis of a relationship that can’t quite be publicly acknowledged, and 'Convalescing in Spain' and 'Don't Drop the Baby' address fear and desire with both grace and humor." The Chicago Tribune opined that "it's a playful debut with some sparkling pop (the title track, 'Daylight') propping up overscrutinized propositions like 'Love's All Counting Sheep'." The Washington Post concluded that "any band that can make the 13th Floor Elevator's 'She Lives (In a Time of Her Own)' sound this tidy could use a little scuffing up." The Indianapolis Star considered Native Son to be one of the best pop/rock albums of 1991.

== Track listing ==
All music by the Judybats, lyrics by Jeff Heiskell, except where otherwise indicated.

1. "Native Son" – 3:19
2. "Daylight" – 3:19
3. "Convalescing in Spain" – 4:07
4. "Don't Drop the Baby" – 3:42
5. "She Lives (In a Time of Her Own)" (Tommy Hall, Roky Erickson) – 4:06
6. "Incognito" – 3:03
7. "In Like With You" – 4:06
8. "Woman in the Garden" – 3:58
9. "Waiting for the Rain" – 4:08
10. "Counting Sheep" – 3:25
11. "Perfumed Lies" (Lyrics: Johnny Sughrue) – 3:44
12. "The Wanted Man" – 4:45

== Personnel ==
The Judybats

- Jeff Heiskell – lead vocals
- Ed Winters – electric guitars
- Terry Casper – drums
- Peggy Hambright – keyboards, violin & vocals
- Timothy Stutz – electric bass & vocals
- Johnny Sughrue – acoustic guitar & vocals

Technical

- Richard Gottehrer – co-producer
- Jeffrey Lesser – co-producer, engineer
- David Cooke – additional engineering
- Jeff Lippay – assistant engineer
- Chris Laidlaw – assistant engineer
- Greg Calbi – mastering
- Terry Casper – design
- Peg Hambright – design, illustration
- Johnny Sughrue – photography
