= Top (band) =

British rock band

Top was a British rock band from Liverpool, signed to Island Records in the early 1990s.

Top's drummer, Alan Wills, had played with The Wild Swans in the 1980s. The group signed to Island Records and released the album Emotion Lotion in 1991. The album spawned two hit singles in the UK: "She's Got All the World", which peaked at #80, and "Number One Dominator", which reached #67. In the US, "Number One Dominator" reached #17 on the Mainstream Rock Tracks chart. Billboard described "Number One Dominator" as a "swirling alternative track" and complimented its "layered vocals" as having a "mysterious and irresistible electronic quality". Alan Wills went on to set up and run British record label Deltasonic.

== Members ==
- Paul Cavanaugh - vocals, guitar
- Alan Wills - drums
- Joe Fearon - bass
