= No Sense of Sin =

Studio album by the Lotus Eaters
- Released: 1984
- Genre: Jangle pop
- Labels: Arista, Sylvan
- Producers: The Lotus Eaters, Dale Griffin, Nigel Gray, Bob Sargeant

No Sense of Sin is the debut studio album of English band the Lotus Eaters. It was released in 1984 by record label Arista. It contains their popular single, "The First Picture of You", released the previous year.

== Release ==
No Sense of Sin reached number 96 in the UK Albums Chart.

The album was re-issued in 2001 by Vinyl Japan and again in 2010 by Cherry Red Records.

== Reception ==
Professional ratings
Review scores
| Source | Rating |
|---|---|
| AllMusic | 4.5/5 stars |

Michael Sutton, writing for Trouser Press, called it "one of the most underrated albums of the '80s" and "a truly special record". The same reviewer also called it "a gorgeously crafted collection of melancholic guitar pop" writing for AllMusic.

== Track listing ==
All lyrics are written by The Lotus Eaters (Gerrard Quinn, Jeremy Kelly and Peter Coyle); all music is composed by The Lotus Eaters, except as noted.

Side A
| No. | Title | Length |
|---|---|---|
| 1. | "German Girl" | 3:10 |
| 2. | "Love Still Flows" | 3:57 |
| 3. | "Can You Keep a Secret" | 3:10 |
| 4. | "Out on Your Own" | 3:55 |
| 5. | "Put Your Touch on Love" | 3:55 |
| 6. | "Too Young" | 2:49 |

Side B
| No. | Title | Music | Length |
|---|---|---|---|
| 1. | "Set Me Apart" | | 3:56 |
| 2. | "You Fill Me with Need" | | 3:39 |
| 3. | "The First Picture of You" | | 3:39 |
| 4. | "Alone of All Her Sex" | Kelly, Coyle | 2:48 |
| 5. | "When You Look at Boys" | Kelly, Coyle | 3:59 |
| 6. | "Start of the Search" | Kelly, Coyle | 3:24 |

1998 Japan and 2001 U.K. CD edition (Does not include "Too Young", "When You Look at Boys" and "Start of the Search")
| No. | Title | Music | Length |
|---|---|---|---|
| 1. | "German Girl" | | 3:10 |
| 2. | "Love Still Flows" | | 3:57 |
| 3. | "Can You Keep a Secret" | | 3:10 |
| 4. | "Out on Your Own" | | 3:55 |
| 5. | "Put Your Touch on Love" | | 3:55 |
| 6. | "Set Me Apart" | | 3:56 |
| 7. | "You Fill Me with Need" | | 3:39 |
| 8. | "The First Picture of You" | | 3:36 |
| 9. | "Alone of All Her Sex" | Kelly, Coyle | 2:48 |
| 10. | "It Hurts" (Standalone single) | Kelly, Coyle | 3:09 |
| 11. | "You Don't Need Someone New" (Standalone single) | | 3:18 |
| 12. | "Two Virgins Tender" (B-side of "You Don't Need Someone New") | Kelly, Coyle | 4:06 |
| 13. | "My Happy Dream" (B-side of "Set Me Apart") | Kelly, Coyle | 2:47 |
| 14. | "The Evidence" (B-side of "It Hurts") | | 3:07 |
| 15. | "Endless" (B-side of "Out On Your Own") | Kelly, Coyle | 4:33 |
| 16. | "Soul In Sparks" (B-side of "It Hurts") | Kelly, Coyle | 2:40 |
| 17. | "Church At Llanbadrig" (B-side of "It Hurts") | Kelly, Coyle | 3:27 |
| 18. | "The Lotus Eaters" (B-side of "The First Picture of You") | Kelly, Coyle | 3:00 |
| 19. | "Out On Your Own" (12" version) | | 5:23 |

2010 U.K. CD reissue bonus tracks (Includes all 12 songs from the original release - does not include "Soul in Sparks", "Church At Llanbadrig" and 7" version of "It Hurts" from 1998/2001 reissue)
| No. | Title | Music | Length |
|---|---|---|---|
| 13. | "You Don't Need Someone New" (Standalone single) | | 3:18 |
| 14. | "Two Virgins Tender" (B-side of "You Don't Need Someone New") | Kelly, Coyle | 4:06 |
| 15. | "My Happy Dream" (B-side of "Set Me Apart") | Kelly, Coyle | 2:47 |
| 16. | "The Evidence" (B-side of "It Hurts") | | 3:07 |
| 17. | "Endless" (B-side of "Out On Your Own") | Kelly, Coyle | 4:33 |
| 18. | "The Lotus Eaters" (B-side of "The First Picture of You") | Kelly, Coyle | 3:00 |
| 19. | "Out on Your Own" (12" version) | | 5:23 |
| 20. | "It Hurts - There Must Be a Taste of Murder in It" (12" version) | Kelly, Coyle | 5:59 |

== Personnel ==
The Lotus Eaters

- Gerrard Quinn – performer, production
- Jeremy Kelly – performer, production
- Peter Coyle – performer, production

Technical personnel

- Bob Sargeant – production (tracks A3, A6, B1, B2, B4 and B6)
- Dale Griffin – production (track B5)
- Nigel Gray – production (track B3)
