= Pain Makes You Beautiful =

Studio album by the Judybats
- Released: 1993
- Studios: Long View Farm, North Brookfield, Massachusetts
- Genres: Pop, rock, alternative rock
- Length: 44:06
- Label: Sire/Warner Bros.
- Producer: Kevin Moloney

The Judybats chronology
Down in the Shacks Where the Satellite Dishes Grow (1992)	Pain Makes You Beautiful (1993)	Full-Empty (1994)

Pain Makes You Beautiful is the third album by the American band the Judybats, released in 1993 by Sire Records. The album contains the band's most successful single, "Being Simple", which peaked at No. 7 on the Billboard Modern Rock Tracks chart. The band supported the album with a North American tour.

== Production ==
Pain Makes You Beautiful saw a significant lineup change for the band, with the departure of keyboardist Peggy Hambright and bassist Timothy Stutz and the arrival of bassist Paul Noe and drummer Dave Kenkins. Recorded live in the studio, the album was produced by Kevin Moloney, who helped the band to shorten and rearrange their songs. The recording studio, Long View Farm Studios, was a country barn, built above horse stables. Many of the songs' lyrics were inspired by the lives of frontman Jeff Heiskell and his friends.

In 2023, Heiskell stated that he loved Moloney's production on the album, which introduced more "organic sounds", and added that he felt the band's earlier records had been overproduced by comparison.

== Critical reception ==
Professional ratings
Review scores
Source	Rating
AllMusic	3/5 stars
Chicago Tribune	2.5/4 stars
The Republican	3/5 stars

Trouser Press stated that "the musicianship is at a consistently high caliber, and the songwriting is tremendously diverse." The Chicago Tribune concluded that "Heiskell, a dominant vocal presence live, is still too mannered on record; he's like a drawling male Annie Lennox, with every intonation sounding studied and self-conscious." The Republican wrote: "Flying in the face of grunge trends, they pack a rippling batch of melodies into crisp pop tracks like the exhilarating 'Ugly on the Outside'." The Washington Post determined that "the Judybats slip loose of their New South neo-folk-rock mold, though not singer/lyricist Jeff Heiskell's sometimes annoying conceits." The Associated Press deemed the album "lightweight pop ... overloaded with ponderous pretensions."

In a retrospective review, Stewart Mason of AllMusic thought the album traded the band's "folky eccentricities" for "a more identifiably alternative rock groove that's considerably less unique", and that Moloney "steers things a little too far to adult album alternative territory at times".

== Track listing ==
All music by the Judybats, lyrics by Jeff Heiskell.

1. "All Day Afternoon" – 3:27
2. "Ugly on the Outside" – 3:47
3. "Being Simple" – 4:13
4. "An Intense Beige" – 3:25
5. "Geography" – 3:03
6. "Wasting Time" – 4:15
7. "Incredible Bittersweet" – 4:03
8. "Scarlett" – 3:24
9. "Trip Me Up" – 3:16
10. "La Dulcinea" – 3:30
11. "My Dead Friend" – 4:36
12. "Pain (Makes You Beautiful)" – 3:12

== Personnel ==
The Judybats

- Jeff Heiskell – lead vocals
- Ed Winters – electric guitars
- Johnny Sughrue – acoustic & electric guitars, vocals
- Paul Noe – bass, guitar, vocals
- Dave Jenkins – drums & percussion

Technical

- Kevin Moloney – producer, mixer, engineer
- Michael H. Brauer – mixer ("All Day Afternoon")
- Bruck Dawit – assistant mixer ("All Day Afternoon")
- Jesse Henderson – second engineer
- Erik Flettrich – second engineer (mixing)
- Stephen Marcussen – mastering
- Perry Iannone – strings ("All Day Afternoon", "Wasting Time")
- Christine Cano – art direction and design
- Michael Wilson – photography
