= Felix Hagan =

English musician

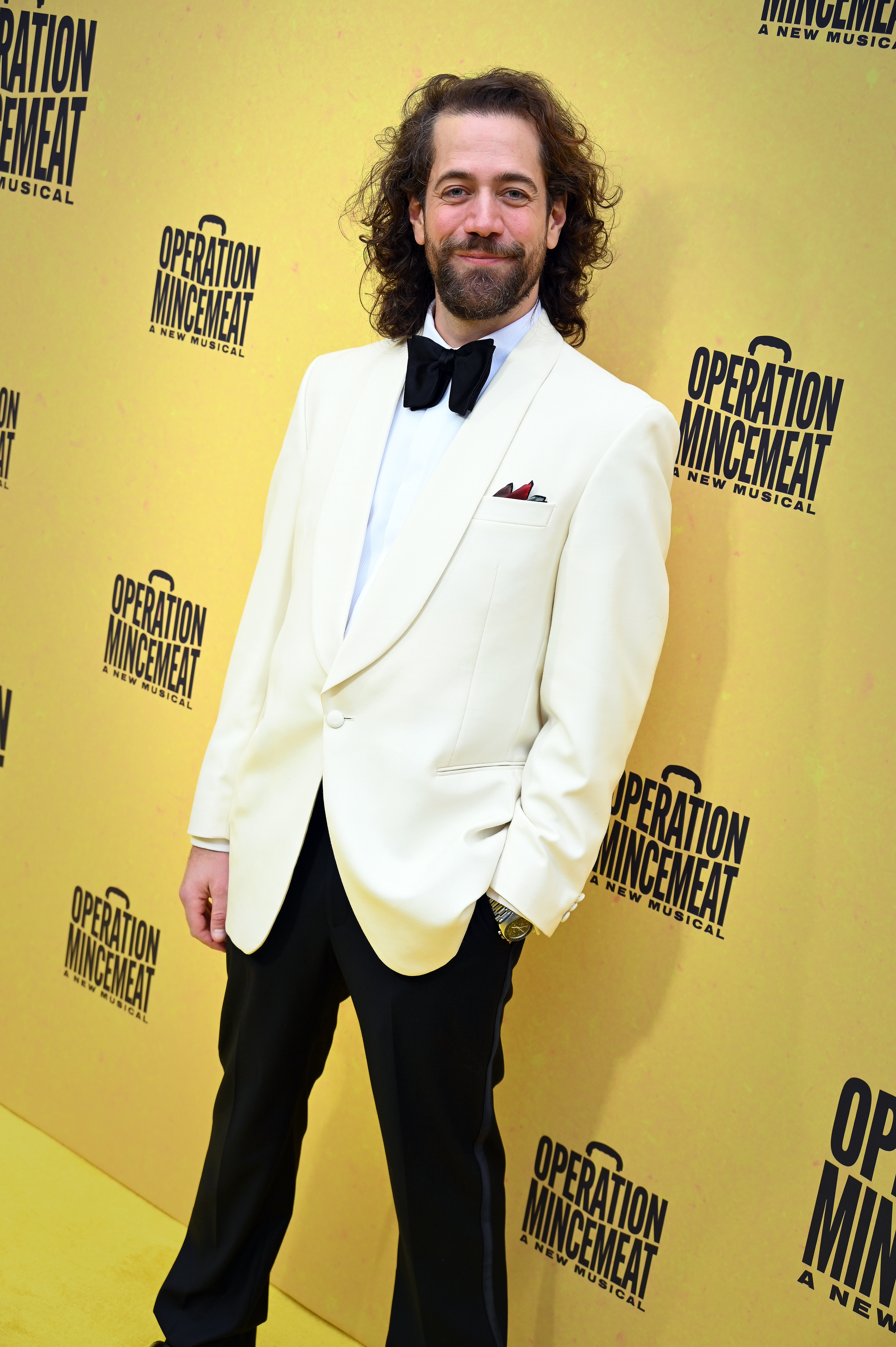
Felix Hagan at opening night of Operation Mincemeat on Broadway, 2025

Felix Hagan (born March 1987) is an English musician, composer, artistic director and performer. He co-created the musical Operation Mincemeat with the comedy troupe SpitLip, which is currently playing in London's West End and Broadway, with a world tour to begin in 2026.

Hagan won the 2024 Laurence Olivier Award for Best New Musical for his work on Operation Mincemeat. He also received the WhatsOnStage Award for Best New Musical, and three Tony Award nominations in 2025 for the show for Best Musical, Best Book of a Musical and Best Original Score.

== Early life and education ==
Hagan was born in London and raised in the New Forest in the UK. His first gig was at age 11 as the drummer for a cover band of older musicians. His first professional gig was with the Duke Spirit at the Astoria when he was 15. He graduated from the University of Liverpool in 2010 with a BA in Popular Music.

== Career ==
=== Operation Mincemeat ===
Hagan composed the musical Operation Mincemeat along with co-writers Natasha Hodgson, Zoe Roberts, and David Cumming as part of the comedy group SpitLip.

The show opened on London's West End in March 2023 and has been renewed there 16 times. It won two Olivier Awards for Best New Musical and Best Actor in a Supporting Role in a Musical from six nominations in 2024.

It opened on Broadway in New York on 20 March 2025, and in 2025 won a Tony Award plus 3 nominations.

Prior to the West End the show premiered at the London Fringe New Diorama Theatre in 2019 and also played in Southwark Playhouse and Riverside Studios.

=== Composer ===
==== Theatre ====
In 2013 Hagan co-wrote (with Jonathan Goldstein and Damian Montagu) and produced the track “Magical Moments (Waiting for You)" , which reached No. 1 on the UK Official Classical Singles Chart for two weeks over Christmas 2013.

In addition to Operation Mincemeat, other theatre writing credits include The Windsors: Endgame (Runway), Don’t Wake the Damp, and Director’s Cut (Kill the Beast).

==== TV ====
Hagan has collaborated with Jack Whitehall having written songs for Bad Education Christmas Special (BBC) while other TV credits include Jack Whitehall Live (Netflix), Cockroaches (ITV), and Backchat with Jack Whitehall (BBC).

His TV credits also include Spitting Image (Avalon/Britbox).

=== Musician ===
Hagan wrote songs and performed with the band Felix Hagan and the Family from 2013. The band supported Frank Turner on his 2016 UK tour.

He has also filled in on keyboards with Frank Turner and the Sleeping Souls for a US and Canada tour.
