= Just Say Yes (compilation album) =

Compilation album by Various artists
- Released: November 4, 1987
- Genre: Alternative rock
- Length: 61:14
- Label: Sire
- Producer: Howie Klein

Various artists chronology
Just Say Yes (1987)	Just Say Yes Volume II: Just Say Yo (1988)

Released on November 4, 1987, Just Say Yes is the first volume of Sire Records' Just Say Yes promotional CD sampler series. It contains "both hard-to-find numbers by the label's established artists and tempting introductions to its promising new artists."

== Track listing ==
1. Depeche Mode - Never Let Me Down Again [Split Mix]
2. Echo & the Bunnymen - Lips Like Sugar [12" Mix]
3. The Mighty Lemon Drops - Out of Hand [Extended Version]
4. James - Ya-Ho
5. The Smiths - Work Is a Four-Letter Word
6. Figures on a Beach - No Stars
7. The Wild Swans - Young Manhood
8. Ice-T - Somebody Gotta Do It (Pimpin' Ain't Easy!) [Remix]
9. The Ramones - I Wanna Live
10. The Replacements - Can't Hardly Wait
11. Throwing Muses - A Feeling
12. Aztec Camera - How Men Are
13. Jerry Harrison - Cherokee Chief
14. Erasure - Hideaway [Little Louie Vega Mix]

It is volume one in the Just Say Yes series of promotional compilations, of which each title was a variation on the 'Just Say' theme:

- Just Say Yes Volume II: Just Say Yo (1988)
- Just Say Yes Volume III: Just Say Mao (1989)
- Just Say Yes Volume IV: Just Say Da (1990)
- Just Say Yes Volume V: Just Say Anything (1991)
- Just Say Yes Volume VI: Just Say Yesterday (1992)
- Just Say Yes Volume VII: Just Say Roe (1994)
