= Full-Empty =

Album by Judybats

Studio album by the Judybats
- Released: August 2, 1994
- Studios: Echo Park, Bloomington, Indiana
- Genre: Alternative rock
- Label: Sire
- Producer: Paul Mahern

The Judybats chronology
Pain Makes You Beautiful (1993)	Full-Empty (1994)	'00 (2000)

Professional ratings
Review scores
Source	Rating
Allmusic	link

Full-Empty is the fourth album by American alternative rock band Judybats, released in 1994 by Sire Records. It was the band's final album for Sire and the last to feature all three original core members Jeff Heiskell, Johnny Sughrue and Ed Winters.

== Background ==
Heiskell had intended for the album to be produced by Mitchell Froom and even sent him a demo tape of new songs, but was told by the Judybats' manager that attempts to reach Froom had been fruitless. Instead, the band opted to work with producer Paul Mahern, both because "he was cheap" and "was also supposed to have some kind of indie cachet at that time." While recording Full-Empty, Heiskell eventually received a phone call from Froom, who said he liked the songs and expressed interest in working with the band, only to be told they were already working with Mahern.

== Promotion ==
The band promoted the album by appearing on Late Night With Conan O'Brien on October 4, 1994, performing "Sorry Counts".

== Track listing ==
All music by Judybats, lyrics by Jeff Heiskell, except where otherwise indicated.

1. "What We Lose" – 4:24
2. "Drought" – 3:51
3. "Happy Song (Settling)" – 3:22
4. "Sorry Counts" – 3:10
5. "Don't Wait for Me" – 3:36
6. "In This Maroon" – 4:40
7. "Wounded Bird" – 3:57
8. "Stupid-Cute" – 3:37
9. "Jive Talkin'" (Barry Gibb, Robin Gibb, Maurice Gibb) – 3:07
10. "Regret Revisited" – 4:28
11. "Stoned" – 3:37
12. "Liquid" – 3:43
13. "The Cachet of Misery" – 2:44
14. "The Lake" – 4:25

== Personnel ==
Judybats

- Jeff Heiskell – lead vocal, backups, Minimoog synthesizer, percussion
- Ed Winters – electric guitar, steel & baritone guitar, dobro, Fender Rhodes keyboard, organ & vibes
- Johnny Sughrue – acoustic guitar, electric guitar, backup vocals, piano
- Paul Noe – bass, dobro, backup vocals
- Dave Jenkins – drums

Technical

- Paul Mahern – co-producer, engineer
- Judybats – co-producers
- Ed Thacker – mixing
- Mass Giorgini – additional engineering
- Mark Hood – additional engineering
- Pat Keating – assistant engineer
- John Jackson – assistant engineer (mixing)
- Stephen Marcussen – mastering
- Robin Easter – design (Design Group)
- Heather Scarbrough – art direction
- John Murphy – photography
- Reed Massengill – band photography
- Brent – hair & make-up stylist (Salon Visage)
- Howard Baybe – wardrobe
