= Just Say Roe =

Just Say Yes Volume VII: Just Say Roe

Compilation album by Various artists
- Released: July 19, 1994
- Genre: Alternative rock
- Length: 70:33
- Label: Sire
- Producer: Howie Klein

Various artists chronology
Just Say Yes Volume VI: Just Say Yesterday (1992)	Just Say Yes Volume VII: Just Say Roe (1994)

Originally released in 1994, Just Say Roe was the seventh and final in the Just Say Yes series from Sire Records. It contained primarily non-album tracks of artists on the label, most of which were alternative rock, but also included some pop and dance. It was conceived specifically as a pro-choice album, put together by Sire after a letter from a listener named Todd VerBeek suggested the title and praised Sire for their willingness to address other politically sensitive issues (including freedom of expression, voter registration, and AIDS education).

== Track listing ==
1. David Byrne - "Lilies of the Valley"
2. Madonna - "Goodbye to Innocence"
3. Doubleplusgood - "The Winding Song"
4. Waterlillies - "I Am Woman"
5. Belly - "It's Not Unusual"
6. The Farm - "Comfort"
7. John Wesley Harding - "Right to Choose"
8. Kristin Hersh - "Hysterical Bending"
9. Scorpio Rising - "It's Obvious"
10. Poster Children - "Roe v. Wade"
11. Danielle Dax - "Defiled"
12. Tripmaster Monkey - "Blatant Affair"
13. Bigod 20 - "It's Up to You"
14. Judybats - "What We Lose"
15. Ride - "I Don't Want to Be a Soldier"
16. Greenberry Woods - "Adieu"

Adapted from Amazon listing.

It is volume seven in the Just Say Yes series of promotional compilations, of which each title was a variation on the 'Just Say' theme:

- Just Say Yes Volume I: Just Say Yes (1987)
- Just Say Yes Volume II: Just Say Yo (1988)
- Just Say Yes Volume III: Just Say Mao (1989)
- Just Say Yes Volume IV: Just Say Da (1990)
- Just Say Yes Volume V: Just Say Anything (1991)
- Just Say Yes Volume VI: Just Say Yesterday (1992)
