= The Lotus Eaters (band) =

British band

- Origin: Liverpool, England
- Genres: New wave
- Years active: 1981–1986; 2002–present
- Labels: Arista, Cherry Red
- Members: Jeremy "Jem" Kelly; Stephen Emmer. Tony Jones
- Past members: Peter Coyle; Ged Quinn; Alan Wills; Phil Lucking; Michael Dempsey; Stephen Creese
- Website: thelotuseaters.com

The Lotus Eaters are an English new wave band formed in 1981 in Liverpool. Their debut single, "The First Picture of You", became a hit in the UK and in continental Europe, notably France, Italy, Belgium and Spain.

== History ==
=== Formation and success ===
The Lotus Eaters was formed in September 1982. Jeremy "Jem" Kelly had been guitarist in the Dance Party with Michael Head and co-founded the Wild Swans in 1980. Peter Coyle had previously been in the Jass Babies. Joined by ex-Wild Swans member Ged Quinn on keyboards, the Jass Babies were offered to record a session for John Peel in August 1982, but before they could fulfill their commitment the band broke up.

Coyle and Kelly then invited Quinn to join them, extended the line-up with drummer Alan Wills and bassist Phil Lucking, and recorded the Peel session in October 1982 as the Lotus Eaters including the song "The First Picture of You". This led to the band being signed by Arista Records.

Replacing Wills and Lucking with bassist Michael Dempsey (formerly of the Cure and Associates) and drummer Steve Crease, "The First Picture of You", produced by Nigel Gray, became an iconic song for The Lotus Eaters in 1983, giving them a UK hit single before the band had even played a live gig. The band recorded a second session for Peel in October 1983.

The band's debut studio album, No Sense of Sin, was released in 1984 on Arista subsidiary Sylvan Records, preceded by two further singles, "You Don't Need Someone New" and "Out on Your Own". Both songs hit the top 100 of the UK Singles Chart, but owing to difficulties with producers and marketing, the impact of "The First Picture of You" was not repeated in the UK. "It Hurts", produced by Kelly, was released in February 1985 and was a hit in Italy, then again in 1995, when it was covered by Italian pop-band T.Y.P.I.C.A.L.

=== Line-up changes and disbandment ===
The Lotus Eaters toured extensively in the UK, France and Italy unveiling many new songs with a stronger sound and visual image which would have probably made an impact had a new album been released then but the band went on hiatus in 1986 after Quinn had departed (replaced by keyboard player Stephen Emmer, formerly of Minny Pops) and parting ways with Arista. "It Hurts", their final single, charted in the Italian Top 5 that year, promoted by a black and white video featuring footage of Louise Brooks and some heavily stylised appearance of the band. However, no further release took place that year and by mid-86, the split was confirmed.

=== Aftermath ===
Coyle recorded as a solo artist, releasing the albums A Slap in the Face for Public Taste and I'd Sacrifice Eight Orgasms with Shirley MacLaine Just to Be There, and went on to found dance company 8 Productions and the G-Love nightclub. As a songwriter/producer, he had success with Marina Van-Rooy's 1990 single "Sly One", and worked with a host of emerging artists on Liverpool's dance scene. Coyle later pursued academic interests at the University of Edinburgh.

Meanwhile, Kelly reformed the Wild Swans, releasing the Bringing Home the Ashes album on Sire in 1988. He co-wrote an album, Soul Fire (released in 2001), with Tom Hingley (ex-Inspiral Carpets), before leaving to study for a PhD in memory-themed multimedia theatre at the University of Reading. Since 1989, Kelly has been writing, staging and performing in music-driven theatre, including Phantoms of the Aperture Part 1: Ted (2015) and Phantoms of the Aperture Part 2: Pictures of Me (2016) examining intersections of time, space, memory and music.

A compilation album of The Lotus Eaters' music, First Picture of You, was released in 1998 by Vinyl Japan/BBC Worldwide, consisting of sessions recorded at BBC Radio 1. No Sense of Sin was reissued that same year by Arista Japan.

=== Reunion ===
In 2001, the Lotus Eaters, comprising the duo of Coyle and Kelly, reformed after almost two decades, recording and releasing a new album titled Silentspace on the Vinyl Japan label.

On 13 March 2009, the band announced a one-off concert to be held at the Liverpool Philharmonic Hall on 25 July. The gig, a performance of the album No Sense of Sin, featured Coyle, Kelly and Emmer accompanied by a string quartet from the University of Huddersfield.

In April 2009, Coyle and Kelly collaborated with Emmer, and announced that they were working with producer Steve Power on material for a new album called A Plug-in Called Nostalgia, which has yet to be released. A limited-edition acoustic album, Differance, was issued the following year as a limited release on Sylvan.

The Lotus Eaters played their first London show in 10 years at the Camden Barfly on 11 June 2010, followed by a string of shows in the UK. The band also toured in Japan in October 2010, with gigs in Tokyo and Osaka.

In 2015, the band announced on their Facebook page that they were still working to release A Plug-in Called Nostalgia.

In 2016 Coyle and Kelly performed with British Electric Foundation at the Rewind Festival, but have not worked together since.

== Discography ==
=== Studio albums ===
Year	Title	Label	
Year	Title	Label	UK
1984	No Sense of Sin	Arista Records/Sylvan Records	96
2002	Silentspace	Vinyl Japan	—
2010	Differance	Sylvan Records	—
"—" denotes releases that did not chart or were not released.

=== Singles ===
Year	Title	Label	Peak chart positions	
Year	Title	Label	AUS	UK
1983	"The First Picture of You"	Arista/Sylvan Records	63	15
1983	"You Don't Need Someone New"	Arista/Sylvan Records	—	53
1984	"Set Me Apart"	Arista/Sylvan Records	—	88
1984	"Out on Your Own"	Arista/Sylvan Records	—	—
1984	"German Girl"	Arista/Sylvan Records	—	—
1985	"It Hurts"	Arista/Sylvan Records	—	87
2001	Stay Free (EP)	Vinyl Japan	—	—
"—" denotes releases that did not chart or were not released in that territory.

=== Compilation albums ===
- First Picture of You (BBC and live sessions, 1982-1984) (1998, Vinyl Japan/BBC Worldwide)
