= Just Say Mao =

Just Say Yes Volume III: Just Say Mao

Compilation album by Various artists
- Released: July 11, 1989
- Genre: Alternative rock
- Length: 78:11
- Label: Sire

Various artists chronology
Just Say Yes Volume II: Just Say Yo (1988)	Just Say Yes Volume III: Just Say Mao (1989)	Just Say Yes Volume IV: Just Say Da (1990)

Just Say Mao was Sire Records' Volume 3 of Just Say Yes and was originally released on July 11, 1989 as a CD sampler. It contained remixes and non-album tracks of artists on the label, most of which were considered new wave or modern rock.

== Track listing ==
1. Everything Counts [Bomb Beyond the Yalu Mix] - Depeche Mode
2. In a Manner of Speaking - Martin L. Gore
3. Accidentally 4th Street (Gloria) [Remix] - Figures on a Beach
4. Thrash - Underworld
5. Pistol - Erasure
6. Insha-Allah - Nasa
7. Dizzy [Remix] - Throwing Muses
8. Whistling for His Love [Remix] - Danielle Dax
9. Lucky Lisp - Morrissey
10. Between Something and Nothing - The Ocean Blue
11. Da'ale Da'ale [Remix] - Ofra Haza
12. Don't Say No [Remix] - Tom Tom Club
13. Hunted Child - Ice-T
14. Nanana - Royal Crescent Mob
15. Date to Church - The Replacements, Tom Waits
16. Nowhere to Stand - k.d. lang
17. Strawman - Lou Reed

Its continued success further fueled a series of subsequent albums, the subtitles of which were variations on the 'Just Say' theme:

- Just Say Yes Volume I: Just Say Yes (1987)
- Just Say Yes Volume II: Just Say Yo (1988)
- Just Say Yes Volume IV: Just Say Da (1990)
- Just Say Yes Volume V: Just Say Anything (1991)
- Just Say Yes Volume VI: Just Say Yesterday (1992)
- Just Say Yes Volume VII: Just Say Roe (1994)
