= The First Picture of You =

Single by The Lotus Eaters

from the album No Sense of Sin
- Released: 3 June 1983
- Recorded: 1982 at Surrey Sound Studios, Leatherhead
- Genre: Sophisti-pop
- Length: 3:42 (Standard Length).; 5:27 (12" Version).
- Label: Arista
- Songwriters: Peter Coyle, Jeremy Kelly, Gerard Quinn
- Producer: Nigel Gray

"The First Picture of You" is a song by English band the Lotus Eaters. It was released as the group's debut single in June 1983, and was included on their debut album No Sense of Sin released the following year.

== Recording ==
The song was first recorded during a John Peel Radio 1 session in 1982 and, when aired, stimulated a bidding war between major UK record labels. It took some time for the band to find the right producer, but they eventually teamed up with Nigel Gray, who had produced for the Police and Siouxsie and the Banshees. Recorded at Surrey Sound Studios in Leatherhead, the track features session bassist Alan Spenner, well known for his work with Joe Cocker and Roxy Music. Former bassist of the Cure and the Associates Michael Dempsey joined soon after and is featured on the rest of the band's debut album.

Coyle wrote the lyrics of the song during a writing session/audition in Liverpool, where Jem and ged had demoed the music on a TASCAM 4 track Portastudio.

== Music video ==
The music video was mainly filmed at a house in Ferry Road, Walberswick with additional scenes shot on Walberswick Beach.

== Release ==
"The First Picture of You" was a top 20 hit on the UK Singles Chart, peaking at number 15 in August 1983.

The song was sampled by the Streets, forming the basis of the track "It's Too Late" on their 2002 album Original Pirate Material.

== Charts ==
Chart (1983)	Peak position
Australia (Kent Music Report)	62
Ireland (Irish Singles Chart)	26
UK (Official Charts Company)	15
