= Just Say Yesterday =

Just Say Yes Volume VI: Just Say Yesterday

Compilation album by Various artists
- Released: September 1, 1992
- Genre: Alternative rock
- Length: 58:42
- Label: Sire/Warner Bros. Records
- Producer: Howie Klein

Various artists chronology
Just Say Yes Volume V: Just Say Anything (1991)	Just Say Yes Volume VI: Just Say Yesterday (1992)	Just Say Yes Volume VII: Just Say Roe (1993)

Just Say Yesterday was Sire Records' Volume 6 of Just Say Yes and was originally released on September 1, 1992 as a CD sampler. It contained remixes and non-album tracks of artists on the label, most of which were considered new wave or modern rock.

== Track listing ==
1. Nowhere Girl - B-Movie
2. Kiss Me - Tin Tin
3. Swear - Tim Scott
4. Don't Tell Me - Blancmange
5. One Step Beyond - Madness
6. Ca Plane Pour Moi (This Life's for Me) - Plastic Bertrand
7. Pop Muzik - M
8. Kiss Kiss Bang Bang - Specimen
9. Caught With the Meat in Your Mouth - Dead Boys
10. Piss Factory - Patti Smith
11. Somebody's Gonna Get Their Head Kicked in Tonight - The Rezillos
12. Jump - Aztec Camera
13. Cath - The Bluebells
14. Teenage Kicks - The Undertones
15. Memphis - Silicon Teens
16. Warm Leatherette - The Normal

It is volume six in the Just Say Yes series of promotional compilations, of which each title was a variation on the 'Just Say' theme:

- Just Say Yes Volume I: Just Say Yes (1987)
- Just Say Yes Volume II: Just Say Yo (1988)
- Just Say Yes Volume III: Just Say Mao (1989)
- Just Say Yes Volume IV: Just Say Da (1990)
- Just Say Yes Volume V: Just Say Anything (1991)
- Just Say Yes Volume VII: Just Say Roe (1994)
