= The Judybats =

American band

- Origin: Knoxville, Tennessee, United States
- Genres: Alternative rock, folk rock
- Years active: 1987–1995, 2000, 2016
- Labels: Sire Records
- Past members: Jeff Heiskell; Johnny Sughrue; Ed Winters; Peggy Hambright; Tim Stutz; Terry Casper; Kevin Jarvis; Paul Noe; Dave Jenkins; Doug Hairrell; Reed Pendleton; Rob Bell; Mike Hairrell

The Judybats (sometimes stylized as merely Judybats or JudyBats) were an American alternative rock band from Knoxville, Tennessee, United States, active primarily in the late 1980s and early to mid 1990s. The band released three successful singles that charted on the Billboard Modern Rock Tracks chart: "Native Son", "Saturday" and "Being Simple", the latter of which peaked at No. 7.

== Background ==
The band was formed in Knoxville, Tennessee in 1987 (although some sources list 1986 or 1988). Frontman Jeff Heiskell and guitarist Ed Winters were neighbors and had been composing folk songs together. The duo later met bassist Tim Stutz at a local bar called Hawkeye's Corner. Stutz, guitarist Johnny Sughrue and drummer Terry Casper had known each other since high school and had been playing music together as a trio. Peggy Hambright, who was Stutz's and Sughrue's roommate at the time, joined the band, contributing keyboards, violin and vocals. The Judybats played locally to large audiences before signing to Sire Records in 1990. The band took their name from a song written by a friend of theirs, which contained the line, "punch me with a judybat", a punning allusion to Punch and Judy shows. The official form of the band's name was never entirely clear; although the band was credited as "The Judybats" on the cover of their 1991 debut album, Native Son, all of their subsequent albums listed the band's name as just "Judybats" or sometimes "JudyBats", although several CD singles from the later albums retained the word "The".

== Sire Records era ==
The Judybats' first major release was a cover of the 13th Floor Elevators' "She Lives (In a Time of Her Own)", which appeared on Sire's Roky Erickson tribute album, Where the Pyramid Meets the Eye, in 1990. The song also appeared on the band's debut album, Native Son, released the following year. The album's titular track was issued as a single and peaked at No. 9 on the Billboard Modern Rock Tracks chart. On May 9, 1991, the band opened for alternative rock act John Wesley Harding—who were joined by R.E.M.'s Peter Buck on guitar—at the Georgia Theatre in Athens, Georgia.

Casper subsequently left the band and was temporarily replaced by session drummer Kevin Jarvis on their second album, Down in the Shacks Where the Satellite Dishes Grow, in 1992. This album spawned the hit "Saturday", which reached No. 21 on the Billboard Modern Rock Tracks chart.

Following that album, Hambright and Stutz both left the band and were replaced by Paul Noe on bass and David Jenkins on drums. The revised lineup released the band's most commercially successful album, Pain Makes You Beautiful, in 1993, and had successful singles on college radio and adult album alternative stations, including "Being Simple", "All Day Afternoon" and "Incredible Bittersweet". "Being Simple" was the band's most successful single, rising to No. 7 on Modern Rock Tracks.

The lineup remained stable for the band's fourth album, 1994's Full-Empty. Heiskell had intended for the album to be produced by Mitchell Froom and even sent him a demo tape of new songs, but was told by the Judybats' manager that attempts to reach Froom had been fruitless. Instead, the band opted to work with producer Paul Mahern, both because "he was cheap" and "was also supposed to have some kind of indie cachet at that time." While recording Full-Empty, Heiskell eventually received a phone call from Froom, who said he liked the songs and expressed interest in working with the band, only to be told they were already working with Mahern.

The band promoted the album by appearing on Late Night With Conan O'Brien on October 4, 1994, performing "Sorry Counts". In an interview with The Advocate the following month, Heiskell acknowledged that he was gay, but otherwise rarely discussed his sexuality with the press, choosing to write about it only indirectly in his songs until his solo career. Looking back in 2023, Heiskell said, "It wasn't talked about in the open all that much back then, but more nuanced. Even so, some people expected me to come out and shout 'I'm A Gay Man!' to sell records. ... I wasn't willing to do that." Full-Empty fared poorly on the charts and the band broke up soon afterward.

In a 2008 interview with Popdose, Heiskell claimed that his dissolution of the band was attributable to several factors, with the last tour being "a nightmare of panic attacks and depression." Heiskell had been writing a screenplay about his experiences as a teenager that rendered him "an emotional wreck for nearly two years." Moreover, Heiskell alleged that band members Paul Noe and David Jenkins had attempted to convince him to break up the Judybats and form a new band with them. Heiskell explained, "By the time the tour ended I weighed 157 pounds – I'm nearly six feet tall – and could scarcely go out during the day for fear of having a bout of serious anxiety." Additionally, Warner Bros. decided to cull their roster of artists, which saw the Judybats losing their contract. "The idea of running about playing shows for schmucks in an attempt to get signed again made me break out in a sweat just thinking about it. And I was convinced that my life had become nothing more than trying to write the next college radio jingle of the week."

== Post-Sire era ==
Heiskell, Noe and Jenkins, along with guitarist Reed Pendleton, pursued a new musical direction under the name Doubters Club, an informal reconfiguration of the Judybats. They released the album Fleur de Lisa independently in 1996, after being dropped from a development deal with Sire. Wayne Bledsoe of the Knoxville News Sentinel observed that the band eschewed the "slightly folky" sound of the JudyBats for "hard-edged tunes that beg the listener to dance", and while he felt the band's hooks were "less obvious than the 'Bats at their best", he strongly praised Heiskell's voice and lyrics.

At this time, Noe and Jenkins formed a second band, Opposable Thumbs, with another Knoxville musician, Todd Steed of Smokin' Dave and the Premo Dopes. Heiskell later claimed that "Dave and Paul moved off to Nashville, hiding from me the fact that they had started another band on the side, taking all of the equipment with them."

After the Doubters Club dissolved, Heiskell seriously considered quitting the music industry, while Pendleton encouraged him to stay the course, with the pair eventually creating a string of new songs, including "Break My Heart", "Shine", "You're Too Much", "Full Forward Angel", "Always", "Love Will Out" and "California". Moving forward, Heiskell and Pendleton formed the band Shoho, Jeff's nickname for local "scenesters" that often attended the band's shows. The lineup consisted of Heiskell on vocals and Pendleton on guitar, joined by local bassist Rob Bell and a set of twin brothers: guitarist/fiddle player Doug Hairrell and drummer Mike Hairrell. Early band sessions were held in a remote log cabin south of Knoxville, where the new lineup developed a guitar-heavy sound with Britpop influences. Upon the insistence of new manager SuperFrank, the band settled on resurrecting the name Judybats for the project. This incarnation of the band issued one album, Judybats '00, in 2000, and released a cover of Paul McCartney's "Love in Song" for the 2001 McCartney tribute album Listen to What the Man Said. "Break My Heart" was also included in Oxford American's annual Southern Music issue.

In 2005, another configuration of Judybats performed at the Northalsted Market Days festival in Chicago.

In 2011, the Judybats '00 track "California" appeared on the compilation album Kat Vox: Celebrating 20 Years of Timmi-Kat Records.

== Post-Judybats ==
In 1992, former keyboardist Peggy Hambright founded Magpies Bakery in Knoxville, Tennessee, and was the owner until 2018, when she passed the business on to her niece, Elizabeth.

Jeff Heiskell has since released five solo albums, under the name Heiskell: Soundtrack for an Aneurism (2007), Clip-On Nose Ring (2008), Arriving (2015), Emotional Terrorism (2017) and Songs in the Key of H (2019). "I did not feel comfortable carrying on the Judybats name with my being the only member", Heiskell explained in 2008. "I didn't really feel that comfortable with it when the '00 record was released, either. A millionaire control freak backed that project financially, so I felt that I had to follow his lead. I follow no one's lead now."

In the fall of 2015, former bassist Tim Stutz released music via Bandcamp, under the name Because of Robots (stylized as "because of robots").

In 2016, Heiskell performed several Judybats songs at Waynestock, a benefit concert for Girls Rock Camp Knoxville.

In 2019, Heiskell became a full-time real estate agent for Coldwell Banker Wallace & Wallace Realtors in Knoxville, Tennessee, while continuing to release original music under the name Heiskell.

In 2023, former guitarist Reed Pendleton's new band the Velvet Air released the single "Save Us", via Bandcamp.

== Discography ==
=== Albums ===
- Native Son (1991)
- Down in the Shacks Where the Satellite Dishes Grow (1992)
- Pain Makes You Beautiful (1993)
- Full-Empty (1994)
- Judybats '00 (2000)

=== Selected compilation appearances ===
- Where the Pyramid Meets the Eye: A Tribute to Roky Erickson (1990) – "She Lives (In a Time of Her Own)"
- Just Say Yes Volume V: Just Say Anything (1991) – "Don't Drop the Baby"
- Meanwhile Somewhere in the Nineties: A Knoxville Band Compilation (1992) – "Wafflehead" (previously unreleased)
- Just Say Yes Volume VII: Just Say Roe (1994) – "What We Lose"
- Everybody Needs Somebody promo sampler (1994) – "Just Like Life" (non-album track)
- Out Loud: For the Human Rights of Lesbians and Gays (1995) – "My Dead Friend"
- The Best of Mountain Stage Live, Vol. 7 (1994) – "Being Simple" (Live)
- Listen to What the Man Said: Popular Artists Pay Tribute to the Music of Paul McCartney (2001) – "Love in Song"
- Kat Vox: Celebrating 20 Years of Timmi-Kat Records (2011) – "California"
