= Figures on a Beach =

US musical group

- Origin: Detroit, Michigan, U.S.
- Genres: New wave, synth-pop
- Years active: 1981–1991
- Label: Sire
- Past members: Anthony Kaczynski; Christopher Ewen; John Richard Rolski (a.k.a. Ricci Ara); Michael "Smitt E. Smitty" Smith; Perry Tell

Figures on a Beach was an early synth-pop and beyond band from Detroit, Michigan that was active from 1981 to 1992. The band had two charting singles in 1989: "Accidentally 4th Street (Gloria)", which reached #14 on the Billboard Modern Rock Tracks chart and a cover of Bachman–Turner Overdrive's "You Ain't Seen Nothing Yet", which peaked at #67 on the Billboard Hot 100.

== History ==
Figures on a Beach was formed in Detroit, Michigan in the early 1980s out of the embers of pioneering electronic group Razor 1922. The band was co-founded by vocalist and keyboardist Anthony Kaczynski and guitarist John "Rik" Rolski, (a.k.a. Ricci Ara in the earliest incarnation of FOAB). With the additions of keyboardist Christopher Ewen and drummer Michael Smith in May 1981, the foundational version of Figures on a Beach was born, to be augmented further by bassist and guitarist Perry Tell, who joined the quartet in 1984. The group released an independent EP, Swimming in 1983, the Don Was-produced single "Breathless" in 1984, as well as 1985's "Paradise/In Camera Obscura" for Detroit's Metro-America label. All of these were collected on a cassette named Paradise and Other Four-Letter Words which was released in early 1986.

Figures moved to Boston, Massachusetts in 1985 and, after submitting a demo version of "No Stars" to producer Ivan Ivan, was signed by Seymour Stein of Sire Records soon afterward. They released their first full-length album in 1987, titled Standing on Ceremony. A self-titled LP (Figures on a Beach) followed in 1989, containing a hit cover of Bachman–Turner Overdrive's "You Ain't Seen Nothing Yet" and a single titled "Accidentally 4th Street (Gloria)". The group disbanded in late 1992 after soldiering on for a year as a quartet with the departure of Rolski.

Anthony Kaczynski went on to form Fireking, originally with Michael Smith. Fireking has released two albums to date, Live a Little, Love a Little in 2001, and the double-album Double Trouble in 2015, as well as contributing tracks to tribute albums for Sloan and Matthew Sweet. Kaczynski produced and played on Trusty Sidekick's 2013 album The Friends of Trusty Sidekick, and also sings seven songs on Gymnasium's 2022 album Hansen's Pop'N'Rock Music '22.

Michael Smith, a.k.a. Smitt E. Smitty, went on to form Smitt E. Smitty & the Fezztones in 2017, and play drums in Little Billy Lost with Fred Pineau of the Atlantics. Smitt E. Smitty & the Fezztones have released one full album titled Just a Modern Guy in 2018, as well as a number of singles, and a number of singles from Little Billy Lost too. Both bands are currently on Rock Garden Records.

As well as carving out a successful career as a DJ in Boston and Cambridge, most notably at beloved nightspot ManRay, Chris Ewen went on to form Future Bible Heroes, a collaboration with Stephin Merritt and Claudia Gonson from The Magnetic Fields. Anthony Kaczynski was brought in to perform Merritt's vocals and played guitar and bass on Future Bible Heroes' 2013 tour in support of their album Partygoing, which Merritt opted to skip. Ewen and Kaczynski joined the Magnetic Fields for their 2017 tour for Merritt's 50 Song Memoir. In 2022, they became full members of The Magnetic Fields and toured the USA and Europe, and have continued touring through 2023, with an upcoming European tour scheduled for November 2023, and a tour celebrating the 25th anniversary of "69 Love Songs" on tap for 2024.

Michael Smith currently performs with Smitt E. Smitty and the Feztones as well as drumming for Little Billy Lost.

== Charting singles ==
Title	Year	Peak chart positions				Album
Title	Year	US Hot 100	US Modern Rock	US Mainstream Rock	UK	Album
"Accidentally 4th Street (Gloria)"	1989	—	14	—	—	Figures on a Beach
"You Ain't Seen Nothing Yet"	1989	67	—	—	—	Figures on a Beach

== Discography ==
=== Albums ===
- Standing on Ceremony (Sire, 1987)
- Figures on a Beach (Sire, 1989)

=== Singles ===
- Swimming EP (Metro America, 1983)
- Breathless (Metro America, 1984)
- Paradise / In Camera Obscura (Metro America, 1985)
- No Stars (Sire, 1987)
- Accidentally 4th St. (Gloria) (Sire, 1989)
- You Ain't Seen Nothing Yet (Sire, 1989)
- Play (Self-released, 2025)

=== Compilation albums ===
- Paradise and Other Four Letter Words (Metro America, 1986)

=== Other appearances ===
- Just Say Yes... (Sire, 1987)
- Just Say Mao (Sire, 1989)
