= Down in the Shacks Where the Satellite Dishes Grow =

Studio album by the Judybats
- Released: 1992
- Studio: Bearsville, Bearsville, New York
- Genre: Jangle pop, alternative rock
- Length: 47:20
- Label: Sire
- Producer: Richard Gottehrer, Jeffrey Lesser

The Judybats chronology
Native Son (1991)	Down in the Shacks Where the Satellite Dishes Grow (1992)	Pain Makes You Beautiful (1993)

Down in the Shacks Where the Satellite Dishes Grow is the second album by the American band the Judybats, released in 1992 by Sire Records. The single "Saturday" peaked at No. 21 on the Billboard Modern Rock Tracks chart.

== Production and promotion ==
Recorded in the summer of 1991, the album was produced by Richard Gottehrer and Jeffrey Lesser. Frontman Jeff Heiskell considered most of the songs to be autobiographical. The album also includes a cover of the Kinks' "Animal Farm". The band had attempted to recruit Kate Pierson of the B-52's to sing on "Poor Bruised World" but were rejected by her agent, who felt she was "overexposed" at the time.

A music video was made for "Is Anything". The band opened for the Original Sins on several tour dates.

== Critical reception ==
Professional ratings
Review scores
Source	Rating
AllMusic	4.5/5 stars
The Indianapolis Star	3.5/4 stars

The Indianapolis Star stated: "The JudyBats' breezy, guitar-driven music is a 75-degree, sunny April day; its lyrics a lonely November in singer Jeff Heiskell's soul." The Washington Post wrote that "what really offsets Heiskell's dolorous, if often original and intriguing, lyrics are the band's abundant energy, shimmering harmonies and contagious choruses."

The Chicago Tribune considered the album to be "filled with vaguely arty but ultimately rather meaningless jangly guitar pop." The San Antonio Express-News opined that it "has a harder edge that the debut, though there is still plenty of guitar jangle."

== Track listing ==
All music by the Judybats, lyrics by Jeff Heiskell, except where otherwise indicated.

1. "Our Story" – 4:34
2. "She's Sad She Said" – 3:18
3. "How It Is" – 4:27
4. "Down in the Shacks Where the Satellite Dishes Grow" – 4:06
5. "Margot Known as Missy" – 3:24
6. "Witches' Night" – 6:26
7. "Is Anything" – 2:55
8. "Poor Bruised World" – 3:04
9. "Animal Farm" (Ray Davies) – 3:34
10. "Saturday" – 3:31
11. "Lullaby~Weren't We Wild" – 4:26
12. "When Things Get Slow Around Here" – 3:42

== Personnel ==
The Judybats

- Jeff Heiskell – lead vocals
- Ed Winters – electric guitars
- Peg Hambright – keyboards, violin, vocals
- Timothy Stutz – bass guitar
- Johnny Sughrue – acoustic guitar, vocals
- Kevin Jarvis – drums & percussion

Technical

- Richard Gottehrer – co-producer
- Jeffrey Lesser – co-producer, engineer
- Chris Laidlaw – assistant engineer
- Greg Calbi – mastering
- Peg Hambright – design
