= Charles LeDray =

American sculptor (born 1960)

Charles LeDray is an American sculptor. He was born in Seattle in 1960. He was a recipient of the "Prix de Rome" from the American Academy in Rome for 1997–98. He lives and works in New York City.

== Early life ==
As a child Charles LeDray learned how to sew – a skill, along with carving and ceramic making, which would later define his work. When asked about his love of sewing, LeDray has said, "The more I did, the more I wanted to do." His pieces are often made out of wood, bone, fabric and wire. LeDray does not work with any studio assistants – his art is a one-person pursuit. Charles LeDray is primarily self-taught, although he attended art school in Seattle and worked as a museum guard at the Seattle Art Museum, both briefly.

== Career ==
LeDray has been described as "the best-kept secret of the contemporary art world, labouring away for years before completing a sculpture." He does not often discuss the meaning of his work, leaving pieces open to interpretation. According to Alan Artner of the Chicago Tribune, "at a time when contemporary art is often wholly dependent on words, the silent, apparently simple but persistently elusive work of LeDray is akin to a blessing." LeDray is perhaps best known for his small, though correctly proportioned sculptures of everyday objects, which "refrain from feeling precious or adorable."

== Fabric-Based Work ==
The subject of LeDray's fabric-based work is primarily clothing; however he is not a fashion designer. Everything he makes is hand-stitched. Each item of clothing by LeDray tells a story, and each piece indicates certain traits which could be found in their wearers. One of LeDray's most frequently visited subjects is men's suits. The clothes include, "miniaturized jackets, shirts and polo tops… trousers, ties, bow ties, gloves, hangers." These sculptures have been interpreted as "marvels of meticulous craftsmanship and poetic symbols of male identity." A three part installation, titled Mens Suits (2006–2009), commissioned by Artangel, was first exhibited in London from 11 July 2009- 18 October 2009. The completion of Mens Suits marked the culmination of three years of full-time work.

== Ceramic Works ==
LeDray also makes hand-thrown ceramic objects. Milk and Honey (1994–1996), is one of these works. Contained within a freestanding glass cabinet, this piece is composed of 2,000 white, miniature ceramic vessels including teapots, vases and saltshakers.

== Workworkworkworkwork ==
Workworkworkworkwork (1991) is another example of LeDray's ability to create collections of pieces. Workworkworkworkwork consists of 588 objects, including shirts, pottery, paintings, necklaces and magazines that recreate displays of objects for sale that homeless people frequently put on New York sidewalks. The piece is not classified by object, however it is more of a confusion of pieces, each "grouping is ordered in its own special way, as if different senses of order were involved, individual orders—different levels of marketing and presentability."

== Bone Sculptures ==
LeDray has made pieces out of human bone. His first works in this medium were depictions of solar system models. He has also used bone to carve sculptures of a flea's ladder, a music stand, a door and a full-size stalk of wheat.
