= Alan Wills (record label founder) =

Founder of Deltasonic

Alan Wills (12 June 1961 – 11 May 2014) was a British record label owner and drummer. He was known for founding Deltasonic, a record label based in Liverpool that signed bands including The Coral and The Zutons. As a musician he played in The Wild Swans, Shack, Top, and the Lotus Eaters. For his work with The Coral he was named one of the Managers of the Year in 2003 by the Music Managers Forum.

== Early life ==
Wills was born in Anglesey, Wales on 12 June 1961, and grew up in the Cemaes area of the county. According to Music Week, Will's father was "in charge of the UK's nuclear early warning system". Wills later said that he learned about management from his father: "He told me it's not about doing everything yourself, but about building teams, finding the best people and letting them get on with it".

== Career ==
In 1981, Wills went to Liverpool to audition as drummer for Pete Wylie's band Wah!. According to Wylie, "I told him he'd 'failed the audition' but I liked him, so I found another band for him to play with so he stayed here." He suggested Wills to another Liverpool band, The Wild Swans, whom Wills went on to join as drummer. Wills also played drums for Shack, Top and the Lotus Eaters.

On 1 January 2000, Wills launched EVA, a dance record label inspired by Mo' Wax that released 10 inch vinyl singles for acts including Paracruisers and the Futurists. A year to the day from founding EVA, the label signed The Coral and its named was changed to Deltasonic, in reference to Delta blues and Sonic Youth. Wills said that at the time, "there hadn't been any great guitar bands for a while. I knew it was going to change", and "I just wanted to do more guitars". Wills printed 1000 copies of the band's first single, "Shadows Fall", and that December the label signed a joint venture licensing deal with Sony Music.

Wills managed The Coral for 18 months as part of a management company owned by the band, Skeleton Key. Also part of the management company were concert promoter Simon Moran and Wills' girlfriend Ann Heston. In 2003, Moran and Wills were named Managers of the Year by the Music Managers Forum.

As well as signing The Zutons, other acts Wills worked with included Candie Payne, the Dead 60s, the Longcut, the Rascals, Miles Kane, and the Last Shadow Puppets.

== Death and legacy ==
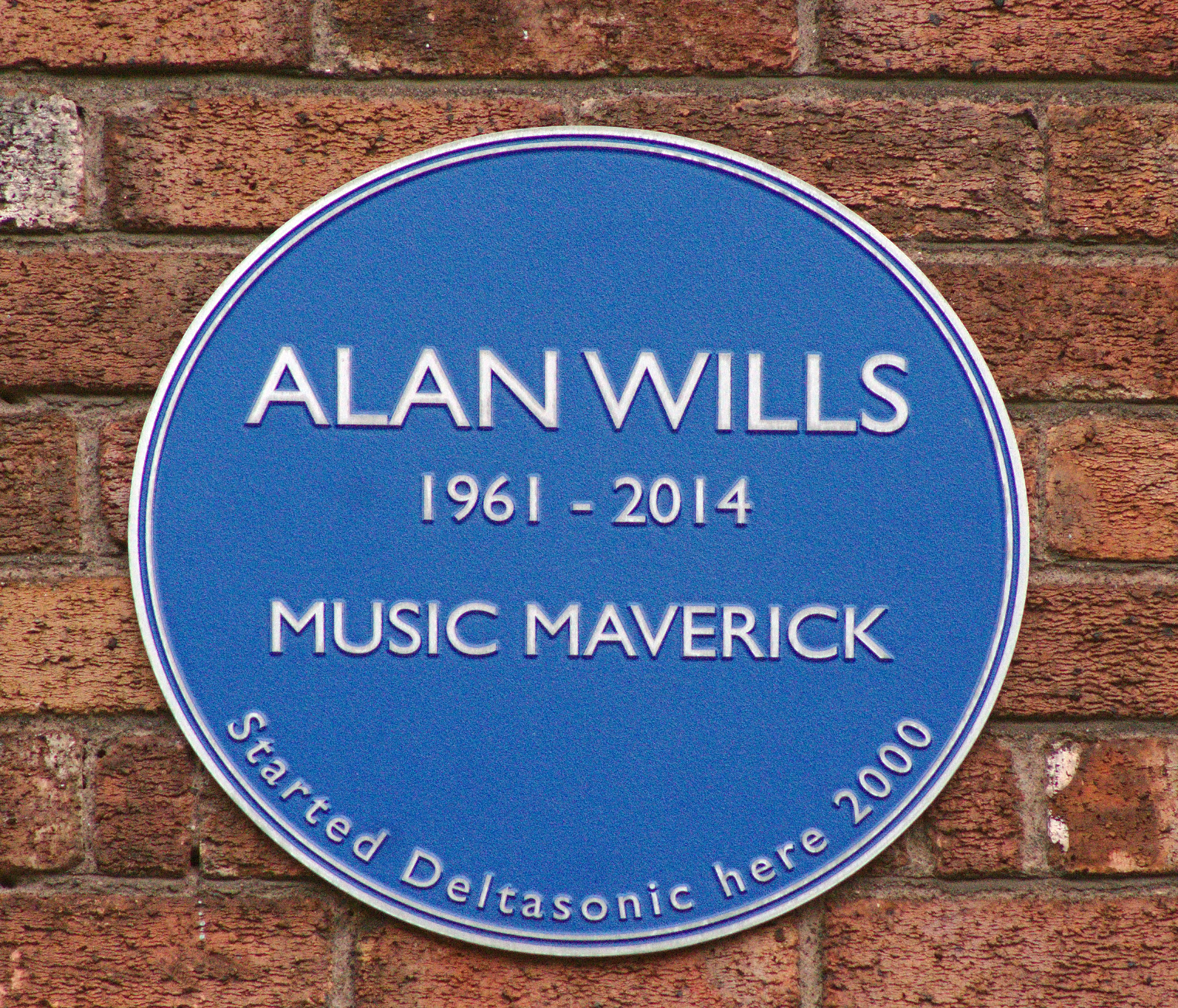
Plaque commemorating Wills at 102 Rose Lane, Mossley Hill.

On 8 May 2014, Wills was admitted to Aintree University Hospital with critical head injuries after a bicycle crash in the Page Moss area of Liverpool. He died three days later. Deputy Liverpool coroner Anita Bhardwaj said in a narrative verdict that the reason for his crash is not known. His funeral was attended by members of The Lightning Seeds, The Farm, Echo & the Bunnymen, Shack, and Cast, among others.

Outside a bar at the site of the former Deltasonic office in the Mossley Hill area of Liverpool is a blue plaque commemorating Wills. Inside the bar is memorabilia from the label, including a gold record awarded for The Zutons' record sales.
