= Felix Hagan & the Family =

British rock band

- Origin: Liverpool, UK
- Genres: Glam rock; pop rock; glam punk
- Years active: 2012–present
- Members: Felix Hagan; Ellie Cowan; Tash Hodgson; Tom Webber; Chris Hunsley; Joe Davison; Stuart Mann
- Website: www.facebook.com/felixhaganmusic/

Felix Hagan & the Family is a rock band from the UK known for their theatrical performances. The seven-member band has released one album and two EPs.

== History ==
Front-man Felix Hagan and guitarist Tom Webber met at the University of Liverpool where they both studied music. At university, they started recruiting fellow students and acquaintances for the band, and by 2012, the full seven-member band had formed.

The band's first EP, "String Up the Entertainer", was released in 2013, and after sharing their music with singer Frank Turner, the band gained his public support. This transitioned into the band's role as a supporting act for Turner during his 2016 tour. There they played music from their first EP, as well as their latest 2015 release, "Kiss the Misfits."

On 24 November 2017 they released their debut album, "Attention Seeker", with glam, pop, rock, and punk influences. "Attention Seeker" topped out at number 6 on the iTunes rock chart, and soon after, the band went on tour to support the Arkells in 2018.

The band stated on their Instagram that they were back recording in the studio in February 2020.

== Members ==
- Felix Hagan – lead vocals
- Ellie Cowan – vocals, violin
- Tash Hodgson – vocals, percussion
- Tom Webber – guitar
- Chris Hunsley – bass
- Joe Davison – keyboards
- Stuart Mann – drums

== Discography ==
=== Albums ===
- Dawn Breaks, the Monster Wakes... (2011)
- Attention Seeker (2017)

=== EPs ===
- String Up the Entertainer (2013)
- Kiss the Misfits (2015)

=== Singles ===
- Delirium Tremendous (2017)
- Attention Seeker (2017)
