= Just Say Anything =

Just Say Yes Volume V: Just Say Anything

Compilation album by Various artists
- Released: July 23, 1991
- Genre: Alternative rock
- Length: 75:10
- Label: Sire

Various artists chronology
Just Say Yes Volume IV: Just Say Da (1990)	Just Say Yes Volume V: Just Say Anything (1991)	Just Say Yes Volume VI: Just Say Yesterday (1992)

Just Say Anything was Sire Records' Volume 5 of Just Say Yes and was originally released on July 23, 1991 as a CD sampler. It contained remixes and non-album tracks of artists on the label, most of which were considered new wave or modern rock. This album carried the Parental Advisory labeling—this was noted in the album's opening track, "Warning Parental Advisory".

== Track listing ==
1. John Wesley Harding & Steve Wynn - Warning Parental Advisory
2. Body Count Featuring Ice-T - Body Count
3. Royal Crescent Mob - Timebomb (Single Mix)
4. Seal - Crazy
5. Dinosaur Jr - Puke + Cry
6. Judybats - Don't Drop the Baby
7. Ride - Today
8. Throwing Muses - Not Too Soon
9. Primal Scream - Higher Than The Sun
10. Morrissey - That's Entertainment
11. The Mighty Lemon Drops - Another Girl, Another Planet
12. Richard X. Heyman - Falling Away
13. Danielle Dax - Big Blue '82 (Zen Mix)
14. My Bloody Valentine - Honey Power
15. Bigod 20 - Carpe Diem (Transmission Mix)
16. Merlin - Feel The Fury
17. The Farm - Groovy Train
18. The Ocean Blue - The Planetarium Scene

Its continued success further fueled a series of subsequent albums, the subtitles of which were variations on the 'Just Say' theme:

- Just Say Yes Volume I: Just Say Yes (1987)
- Just Say Yes Volume II: Just Say Yo (1988)
- Just Say Yes Volume III: Just Say Mao (1989)
- Just Say Yes Volume IV: Just Say Da (1990)
- Just Say Yes Volume VI: Just Say Yesterday (1992)
- Just Say Yes Volume VII: Just Say Roe (1994)
