= Ged Quinn =

English artist and musician (born 1963)

- Born: 1963 (age 62–63); Liverpool, England
- Education: Ruskin School of Art, St Anne's College, Oxford, Slade School of Art, London, Kunstakademie Düsseldorf, Rijksakademie, Amsterdam
- Known for: Painting, music

Ged Quinn (born 1963, Liverpool) is an English artist and musician. He studied at the Ruskin School of Art and St Anne's College in Oxford, the Slade School of Art in London, the Kunstakademie Düsseldorf and the Rijksakademie in Amsterdam. He now lives and works in the UK.

Quinn has exhibited internationally in many shows including 'FOCUS: Ged Quinn' at the Modern Art Museum of Fort Worth, Texas, US, 'Endless Renaissance' at Bass Museum, Miami Beach, 'Beyond Reality: British Painting Today' at Galerie Rudolfinum in Prague, and 'Newspeak: British Art Now' at State Hermitage Museum, Saint Petersburg, Russia.

He was represented by Wilkinson Gallery and is now represented by Stephen Friedman Gallery in London.

In addition to his work as an artist, Quinn was a member of the 1980s new wave musical groups the Teardrop Explodes, the Wild Swans and the Lotus Eaters, and co-wrote the latter band's 1983 hit single "The First Picture of You".

== Work ==
He specialises in allegorical paintings that include contemporary images (generally on controversial topics in Western cultural history) in idyllic scenes based on classical paintings such as the pastoral works of Claude Lorrain and Caspar David Friedrich.

For example, his "Cross in the Wilderness" introduces a miniature Spandau Prison, the iconic jail for Nazi war criminals, into a forest scene based on The Chasseur in the Woods by Friedrich, a leading painter in German Romanticism. Another painting, "Darkening of the Green", places the controversial HM Prison Maze into a rural landscape.

Despite the familiar aspects in Ged Quinn’s use of painting techniques—ranging from the classical and Romantic traditions of European landscape, such as Caspar David Friedrich, to the American Sublime—his introduction of incongruent and often disturbing imagery, disruptions of scale, and an undercurrent of religious sensibility and political and cultural iconography creates a sense of haunting and dislocation.

In Quinn’s work, the landscapes themselves have a visionary character, providing an unfolding freedom that is a boundless showground for significance. There are circulations, juxtapositions, and layering that allow for a large amount of readings and narratives to develop and disappear. There is a constant sense of play both between and within the imagery, which gives space for meanings, yet ultimately denies the satisfaction of any final explanation.

There is an energy that moves throughout his works, which is in part driven by Quinn’s surreal and radical methods of composition and use of imagery. In conflicting and irregular landscapes, there are complex voids and structures.

Quinn is known for his densely layered paintings that reinterpret historical artistic techniques in a contemporary context. His work often engages with cultural symbols through intervention rather than strict representation, addressing themes of historicity and the relationship between internal and external perspectives. His paintings are characterized by detailed execution and the combination of multiple visual narratives and symbolic elements.

== Selected exhibitions ==
=== Solo ===
- 2017 Rose, Cherry, Iron Rust, Flamingo, Pearl Lam Galleries, Hong Kong, China
- 2016 Ged Quinn, Stephen Friedman Gallery, London, UK
- 2014 Ged Quinn, Stephen Friedman Gallery, London, UK
- 2013–14 Ged Quinn, New Art Gallery Walsall, West Midlands, UK
- 2012–13 Endless Renaissance, Bass Museum, Miami Beach, USA
- 2012 FOCUS: Ged Quinn, Modern Art Museum of Fort Worth, Texas, USA
- 2010 Ged Quinn, Stephen Friedman Gallery, London, UK
- 2010 Somebody’s Coming That Hates Us, Wilkinson Gallery, London, UK
- 2007 My Great Unhappiness Gives Me a Right to Your Benevolence, Wilkinson Gallery, London, UK
- 2005 The Heavenly Machine, Spike Island, Bristol, UK
- 2004 Utopia Dystopia, Tate St. Ives, UK.
- 1994 Oxide Cinema, video media installation, Rijksakademie, Amsterdam, the Netherlands

=== Group ===
- 2018 Richard Patterson | Ged Quinn, Galleria Mucciaccia, Rome, Italy
- 2017 Synthetic Landscapes: Reviewing the ideal landscape, Meadow Arts and Shrewsbury Museum and Art Gallery, Weston Park, Shifnal, UK
- 2015 CLASSICICITY: Ancient art, contemporary objects, Breese Little, London, UK
- 2015 Twentieth Anniversary Exhibition, Stephen Friedman Gallery, London, UK
- 2015 Homeland: Glenn Brown, Dexter Dalwood, Ged Quinn, Toby Ziegler,, Simon Lee HK, Hong Kong, China
- 2014 Somos Libres II, Pinacoteca Giovanni e Marella Agnelli, Turin, Italy
- 2014 Cake and Lemon Eaters: Viktor Pivovarov and Ged Quinn, Galerie Rudolfinum, Prague, Czech Republic; The Gallery of Fine Arts in Ostrava, Czech Republic
- 2014 Landscape 2000, Osnabrück Cultural History Museum and Felix Nussbaum Haus, Osnabrück, Germany
- 2013 Looking at the View, Tate Britain, London, UK
- 2013 The Future's Not What It Used To Be, Newlyn Art Gallery, Penzance, UK
- 2013 Disaster/The End of Days, Galerie Thaddaeus Ropac, Paris, France
- 2012 The Endless Rennaissance, Bass Museum of Art, Miami, USA
- 2012 Beyond Reality: British Painting Today, Galerie Rudolfinum, Prague, Czech Republic
- 2012 Everywhere and nowhere, Reydan Weiss Collection, Oberstdorf, Germany
- 2010 The Witching Hour, Waterhall, Birmingham Museum & Art Gallery, Birmingham, UK
- 2010 Chambres à part IV: Mascarade, A proposition by Laurence Dreyfus, Paris, France
- 2010 Restore Us and Regain: Ged Quinn, Tommy Grace, Tony Swain, Mackintosh Museum, The Glasgow School of Art, Glasgow, UK
- 2010 Lust for Life & Dance of Death, Olbricht Collection, Kunsthalle Krems, Austria
- 2010 Newspeak: British Art Now, Saatchi Gallery, London, UK
- 2009 Newspeak: British Art Now, State Hermitage Museum, Saint Petersburg, Russia
- 2009 Kunskog, Five Hundred Dollars, London, UK
- 2009 Kings, Gods and Mortals, Hamish Morrison Galerie, Berlin, Germany
- 2008 John Moores 25, Walker Art Gallery, Liverpool, UK
- 2008 Made Up, Liverpool Biennale 2008, Tate Liverpool, UK
- 2008 Jekyll Island, Galerie Charlotte Moser, Geneva, Switzerland
- 2008 Doktors Traum, Olbricht Collection—New Aspects, Neues Museum Weserburg, Bremen, Germany
- 2008 Monochrome: Drawing & Prints, Rabley Drawing Centre, Wiltshire, UK
- 2007 Stranger than Paradise, Galerie Charlotte Moser, Geneva, Switzerland
- 2007 Rockers Island, Olbricht Collection, Museum Folkwang, Essen, Germany
- 2007 Salon Nouveau, Engelholm Gallery, Vienna, Austria
- 2006 Collezionami, 2nd Biennale of Southern Italy, Puglia, Italy
- 2005 The Real Ideal, Millennium Galleries, Sheffield, UK
- 2005 Wonderings…, Waugh & Thistleton, London, UK
- 2005 ShowCASe, City Art Gallery, Edinburgh, Scotland
- 2005 MOSTYN 2005, Oriel Mostyn, Llandudno, Wales, UK
- 2000 Brooks Quinn Voss, Newlyn Art Gallery, Penzance, UK
- 1999 Show, Elizabeth Dee Gallery, New York, NY, USA
- 1999 IWPC 10, Museum of Recent History, Ljubliana, Slovenia
- 1997 Performance, video installation with Oliver Herring, Camden Arts Centre, London, UK
- 1995 Language of the Wall, Museum of Contemporary Art, Ljubliana, Sloveni

== Collections ==
British Museum, London, UK, FLAG Art Foundation, New York, USA, Honart Museum, Tehran, Iran, Modern Art Museum of Fort Worth, Texas, USA, Olbricht Collection, Essen, Germany, Saatchi Collection, London, UK, Tate Collection, London, UK, Tel Aviv Art Museum, Israel, Victoria & Albert Museum, London, UK, K11 Art Foundation (KAF), Hong Kong

== Fellowships and residencies ==
- 1995 British Council bursary for Slovenia
- 1993 NUFFIC bursary for Rijksakademie, Amsterdam, the Netherlands
- 1988 DAAD Scholarship, Germany
- 1987 Boise Fellowship

== Selected publications ==
- 20 Years, essays by Stephen Friedman and Sarah Thornton (2015), Stephen Friedman Gallery, London, UK (catalogue)
- Cake and Lemon Eaters. Viktor Pivovarov & Ged Quinn (2014), Galerie Rudolfinum, Prague, Czech Republic
- Ged Quinn, text by Michael Bracewell and Dr Brian Dillon (2013), New Art Gallery Walsall, West Midlands, UK
- Ged Quinn: FOCUS, text by Andrea Karns (2012), Fort Worth Museum of Art, Fort Worth, Texas, USA (exhibition brochure)
- Ged Quinn (2011), Stephen Friedman Gallery, London, UK (catalogue)
- Lust for Life & Dance of Death (2010), Olbricht Collection, Kunsthalle Krems, Krems, Austria
- Newspeak: British Art Now (2010), The Saatchi Gallery, London, UK
- Newspeak: British Art Now (2009), The State Hermitage Museum, Saint Petersburg, Russia
- My Great Unhappiness Gives Me a Right to Your Benevolence, text by Michael Bracewell (2007), Wilkinson Gallery, London, UK
