= The Wild Swans (band) =

English post-punk band

- Origin: Liverpool, England
- Genres: Post-punk; new wave
- Years active: 1980–1982, 1986–1990, 2009–2011, 2019–present
- Labels: Zoo, Sire/Warner Bros., Renascent Records, Occultation Records
- Spinoffs: Care; The Lotus Eaters
- Members: Paul Simpson; Les Pattinson; Ged Quinn; Ricky Maymi; Mike Mooney; Stuart Mann; Richard Turvey
- Past members: Jeremy Kelly; Alan Wills; Joseph Fearon; Colin Mackin; Ian McNabb; Chris Sharrock; Ian Broudie; Justin Stavely; James Weston; Pete de Freitas; Rolo McGinty; Steve Beswick

The Wild Swans are a post-punk band from Liverpool, England, formed in 1980 shortly after Paul Simpson left the Teardrop Explodes. The band's personnel has been subject to regular turnover, with vocalist Simpson being the only constant member.

The original incarnation of the Wild Swans lasted until 1982, issuing one single. A reconstituted incarnation of the band issued two albums from 1988 to 1990 before dissolving again. In 2009, Simpson put a new lineup together and the group played numerous live dates, issuing a new studio album in 2011.

The Wild Swans also spun off two charting splinter projects: Care and the Lotus Eaters. Members of the Wild Swans have also been members of Echo & the Bunnymen, the Icicle Works, the Woodentops, the Brian Jonestown Massacre and the Lightning Seeds.

== History ==
=== Origins: The Wild Swans, Mark I (1980–1982) ===
The Wild Swans formed in 1980 when Paul Simpson, who had left the Teardrop Explodes after the recording of their first single, teamed up (on vocals) with Jeremy Kelly (guitar), Ged Quinn (keyboards), James Weston (bass) and Justin Stavely (drums).

An opportunity arose when Pete de Freitas of Echo & the Bunnymen (an old friend and flatmate of Simpson's) agreed to fund their first single "Revolutionary Spirit" (1982, Zoo Records). Stavely had dropped out of the band, so De Freitas ended up financier, drummer and producer for the single; he was credited under his middle names, Louis Vincent. Despite turning out to be Zoo's last ever release, and the A-side being accidentally mixed in mono rather than stereo, the single received a measure of critical acclaim and in time, developed cult status. The single spent 9 weeks on the UK Independent Chart, peaking at No. 13.

Subsequent to the release of "Revolutionary Spirit", weekly rehearsals were given a degree of urgency when the band was offered a BBC Radio 1 John Peel session. Songs on this session, all written by the team of Simpson, Quinn and Kelly, included "No Bleeding", "Enchanted" and "Thirst". By this point, the band was rounded out by two new members: Baz Hughes (bass) and Joe McKechnie (drums).

The Wild Swans were sporadically active in the early 1980s; touring with Echo & the Bunnymen in 1981 following a residency with the Teardrop Explodes. A David Jensen session came in spring 1982, with the band penning and performing "The Iron Bed", "Flowers of England" and "Now You're Perfect". The group split very soon after this BBC Radio 1 session was broadcast.

=== Post-split: Care and the Lotus Eaters (1982–1985) ===
Once the band split, Kelly and Quinn started up the Lotus Eaters with co-founder Peter Coyle. Simpson followed suit with the duo Care, teaming up with Ian Broudie. Strangely, Arista Records, who had refused to sign the Wild Swans, then snapped up both of the offshoots.

Both groups issued several singles, with the Lotus Eaters scoring a chart hit, and releasing an album in 1984. Care, meanwhile, reached number 48 on the UK charts with the single "Flaming Sword". Both bands had broken up by 1985, with Care having recorded an unreleased album.

=== Revival: The Wild Swans, Mark II (1986–1990) ===
Stylised artwork on a flyer

In 1986, the session recorded for the Radio 1 John Peel show was finally released on Strange Fruit Records, containing the tracks "No Bleeding", "Enchanted", and "Thirst". The session release was promoted by Kelly on BBC Radio 1 and it repeated the single's success, peaking at No. 13 on the independent chart. Shortly thereafter, Simpson, Kelly and Quinn got together and began playing once again as the Wild Swans.

By 1988, Quinn had dropped out, Simpson and Kelly were joined on bass by Joe Fearon, and a long-awaited debut album finally emerged. Titled Bringing Home the Ashes (1988, Sire/Reprise Records), and featuring uncredited session players on keyboards and drums, it was produced by Paul Hardiman and yielded two singles, "Young Manhood" (which first appeared on the 1987 Sire Records promotional sampler Just Say Yes) and "Bible Dreams". Simpson is nowadays disparaging of the sound developed on the album and feels that some of the aura and magic surrounding the (Mark I) Wild Swans had been lost. "Major label thinking is like a virus, you forget why you started the band and fall into the 'hit' record mind-set". He went on to offer even more stark words of wisdom for those thinking of setting up a band: "Major labels suck the poetry from your bones and fill the gaps with a cement made from cocaine and crushed teenagers." However, Kelly, who programmed drums and worked with producer, Paul Hardiman, remains upbeat about the album, which remains the band's most popular recording on Spotify.

==== Bringing Home the Ashes, Space Flower, and second breakup ====
Bringing Home the Ashes was issued in the United States initially, followed by UK and German releases. A near-simultaneous promo-only release called Music and Talk from Liverpool included Wild Swans tracks interspersed with interviews with Jeremy Kelly.

A second album on Sire, Space Flower, was released in 1990, subsequent to the departure of Kelly. It was produced by Ian Broudie, and featured a line-up of Paul Simpson (vocals, mellotron, effects), Joe Fearon (bass), Ian Broudie (guitars, keyboards), Chris Sharrock (drums) and Ian McNabb (additional guitars, vocals). Sharrock and McNabb were both of the Liverpool three piece the Icicle Works. Much of the material written for the album had a food-flavoured theme, depicted by the tracks "Melting Blue Delicious", "Tangerine Temple", "Chocolate Bubble-Gum" and "Vanilla Melange". The album was released in the US, Germany and Japan, but not initially in the UK.

The Wild Swans split up again shortly after Space Flower and Simpson went on to form his own project 'Skyray', recording several singles, EPs and albums, and the spoken word project Dream Diaries.

=== Reissues and retrospectives (2003–2007) ===
In 2003, a retrospective collection of rare Wild Swans recordings was compiled and released by Renascent Records. Incandescent is a double album containing material from 1981 to 1987, but mostly from the band's earliest period. It includes the Peel, Jensen and Long Sessions, as well as a number of live songs, demos and alternative versions. An accompanying booklet featured biographical information on the band and a detailed track by track commentary from Simpson. The familiar 'Icarus Swan' artwork, which first appeared on the cover of "The Revolutionary Spirit", also returned for a second outing.

In 2007, after many years of deletion, Sire Records finally elected to re-release both Bringing Home the Ashes and Space Flower, this time giving them a full UK release. Both albums were re-packaged as a 2-CD set called Magnitude, whose cover and artwork this time mirrored 1988's Wild Swans – Music and Talk from Liverpool album, complete with familiar Swan design. The album itself was released as part of Sire's April 2007 relaunch of the Korova label, alongside other re-releases from acts like Ian McCulloch and Electrafixion, all 2-CD sets with extra tracks.

Magnitude CD 1 features the whole of Bringing Home the Ashes and the four B-sides from the singles "Young Manhood" and "Bible Dreams", all mastered from the original tapes.

CD 2 features the first UK appearance of the Space Flower album, with the addition of an extra track, recorded back in 1989 but left off the album at the time, called "Tastes Like Tuesday". Another studio recording is the Bill Drummond unreleased single remix of "Melting Blue Delicious". The second disc concludes with five demo recordings, made by Simpson back in late 1988, including early versions of "Melting Blue Delicious" (called "Telescope") and another mix of "Tastes Like Tuesday".

Magnitude enjoyed a relatively short physical shelf life as a 2-CD set, as in June 2007 Warner Brothers (UK) was disbanded by the parent company and the album was deleted.

=== Second revival: The Wild Swans, Mark III (2009–2011) ===
Paul Simpson declared his intention to resurrect the Wild Swans on his Myspace site in late 2007:

"This unhappy band has been unfinished business for me for over 20 years, haunting my days and nights, obsessing my thoughts at the expense of my health and sanity. I never got over the sudden implosion of the first incarnation and was devastated by the crash and burn of the second. In returning from the ambient wilderness I am not trying to recreate the unique sound of any of the former members, how could I? It is the original spirit of the group I am after, the original blueprint for an English electric brotherhood. I formed and named the band shortly after leaving The Teardrop Explodes back in 1980, individually recruiting the members and establishing both the look and the compass direction. I lived and breathed The Wild Swans Mk. I and was traumatised to see it seized and taken from me, so this shouldn't be viewed as a reformation or even an exorcism, it is a continuum; different but the same."

A year and a half later, the band had indeed reformed, albeit with a very revised line-up: founder and original member Paul Simpson was now joined by original member Ged Quinn, Ricky Rene Maymi (Brian Jonestown Massacre), Les Pattinson (Echo and the Bunnymen), Mike Mooney (Julian Cope/Spiritualized), and Steve Beswick (the Heart Throbs/Slipstream). Quinn very quickly dropped out of performing with the group, but was still regarded as an 'honorary' member who made contributions to the group's promotional artwork.

==== English Electric Lightning single (2009) ====
The "Mark III" version of the Wild Swans released the group's first single in over 20 years in May 2009, a limited edition 10" vinyl single on the Occultation label entitled "English Electric Lightning", with Henry Priestman guesting on keyboards. The single featured at number four on Mojo magazine's 'Playlist' in April 2009, and received favourable reviews in a number of publications. The Wild Swans follow-up single "Liquid Mercury" was released on Occultation on 30 November 2009, and was placed at number 5 in the Mojo Vinyl Countdown.

On 23 and 24 July 2009, the Wild Swans performed live for the first time since their 1990 demise. The sell out gigs were performed to an audience of 200 each night at Liverpool's Static gallery. Henry Priestman guested on keyboards, and guitarist Will Sergeant (Echo and the Bunnymen) joined the band for the encores and was DJ each night. The Wild Swans played a third gig at Static Gallery, Liverpool on 11 December 2009, having officially expanded to a sextet with the addition of newest band member Richard Turvey on keyboards.

==== The Wild Swans Live at Static Gallery 2009 ====
On 6 February 2010, the Wild Swans released a five-track live download (The Wild Swans Live at Static Gallery 2009) featuring the tracks "Archangels", "The Revolutionary Spirit", "Tangerine Temple", "Melting Blue Delicious" and "Bringing Home the Ashes". The release was briefly available online to help fund recording costs and was withdrawn from sale in March 2010. The latter three tracks feature guest guitarist Will Sergeant and marked the first recording of Sergeant and Les Pattinson playing together since 1997.

==== The Coldest Winter for a Hundred Years (2010) and 2011 tour ====
Recording of the new album The Coldest Winter for a Hundred Years finished on 10 September 2010; it was released early in 2011. In February 2010, Paul Simpson said "For the first time ever I am happy with the results, the unmixed tracks are sounding so good its scary. It may be 20 odd years late but I think we have finally made the definitive Wild Swans masterpiece." The 13-track album featured 11 new songs alongside the A-sides of both 2009 singles ("Liquid Mercury" appearing in a noticeably different form from the original single mix.) The B-sides, which included the track after which the album is named, did not appear on the album. Joining the sextet as guest performers on a handful of the album's newer tracks were Will Sergeant and Candie Payne; Ged Quinn painted the album cover.

In May 2011, the band issued a 3-song EP of outtakes from the Coldest Winter sessions entitled Tracks in Snow, followed by a five-date UK tour in June. Producer Rich Turvey played keyboards and Stuart Mann joined the band on drums. Later that year, the band performed two successful shows in the Philippines, one concert in Cebu City on 30 September and the other at the SM Mall of Asia, Manila on 1 October.

=== After 2011 ===
The Wild Swans have neither played live nor released any new material since 2011. In 2019, a posting on Paul Simpson's website announced that the Wild Swans were recording material (in November 2019) intended for release in 2020 or 2021. The band line-up was indicated as being Simpson, Marty Willson-Piper, Ricky Maymi, Edgar Jones, Stuart Mann and Richard Turvey.

Since Simpson's 2019 announcement, there have been no further specific updates about the recordings, or the band's personnel. However, the front page of Simpson's website noted in 2021 that "Paul is working on his long awaited book and also a new ‘Wild Swans’ album." Simpson's book Revolutionary Spirit was issued in late 2023. Most recently, after initially touting a potential release date of "early 2025", then revised to 2026, the site now promises a new Wild Swans album in 2027.

== Discography ==
=== Studio albums ===
- Bringing Home the Ashes (1988), Sire/Reprise
- Space Flower (1990), Sire/Reprise
- The Coldest Winter for a Hundred Years (2011), Occultation

==== EPs ====
- The Peel Sessions (1986), Strange Fruit
- Tracks in Snow (2011), Occultation – outtakes from the Coldest Winter sessions

==== Live albums ====
- For One Stormy Night Only (2010), Astral Girl

==== Compilation albums ====
- Incandescent (2003), Renascent – compilation of 1980s radio sessions, demo tracks and rarities
- The Platinum Collection (2006), Warner Music Philippines
- Magnitude (2007), Korova/Sire/Rhino – compiles the first two studio albums, plus B-sides and outtakes

=== Singles ===
Year	Single	Album	Label	Notes	
Year	Single	Album	Label	Release formats	B-sides
1982	"Revolutionary Spirit"	Non-album single	Zoo	12"	"God Forbid"
1988	"Young Manhood"	Bringing Home the Ashes	Sire	7", 12"	"Holy Holy" (7" & 12"), "The World of Milk and Blood" (12")
1988	"Bible Dreams"'	Bringing Home the Ashes	Sire	7", 12"	"1982" (7" & 12"), "Pure Evil" (12")
2003	"The Iron Bed"	Incandescent		CD, mp3	
2009	"English Electric Lightning"'	The Coldest Winter for a Hundred Years	Occultation	10", CD, mp3	"The Coldest Winter for a Hundred Years"
2009	"Liquid Mercury"'	The Coldest Winter for a Hundred Years	Occultation	7", CD, mp3	"The Wickedest Man in the World"
