= Barry X Ball =

American sculptor

- Born: 1955 (age 70–71); Pasadena, California
- Known for: Sculpture
- Website: barryxball.com

Barry X Ball (born 1955, Pasadena) is an American sculptor who lives and works in New York City.

His work has been widely exhibited internationally over the last 30 years and is represented in many public and private collections.

His work has been exhibited at the Ca’ Pesaro International Gallery of Modern Art, Powerhouse Museum / Museum of Applied Arts & Sciences, Frist Center for the Visual Arts, Museum of Arts and Design, Bass Museum of Art, Ca’ Rezzonico in conjunction with la Biennale di Venezia, PS 1 Contemporary Art Center, SITE Santa Fe, Ballroom Marfa, Galerie Nationale du Jeu de Paume, Magasin 3 Stockholm Konsthall, Le Printemps de Septembre, Domaine de Kerguéhennec, Kunsthalle Krems, Museo Cantonale d’Arte, me Collectors Room Berlin, Modemuseum Hasselt, Beijing Today Art Museum, Museo di arte moderna e contemporanea di Trento e Rovereto, Le Quartier, Centre d’art contemporain de Quimper, Musée d’art contemporain de Lyon, and at many international contemporary galleries and art fairs.

His work is in the collections of the Hammer Museum, San Francisco Museum of Modern Art, The Norton Museum of Art, The Maramotti Collection, Le Fonds régional d’art contemporain Bretagne, Magasin 3 Stockholm Konsthall, Museo Cantonale d’Arte, Museo di arte moderna e contemporanea di Trento e Rovereto, The Berlingieri Collection, The Olbricht Collection, and The Panza Collection.

== Early life ==
Ball attended Pomona College, graduating in 1977.

== Solo exhibitions ==
- 1986: Craig Cornelius Gallery, New York City. March 15 - April 16
- 1988: Craig Cornelius Gallery, New York City. May 19 - June 18
- 1990: Fonds régional d'art contemporain de Bretagne, Brittany, France. Domaine de Kerguéhennec. (exh. cat.) Curated by Jean-Pierre Criqui. June 30 – September 2.
- 1991: Galerie Isy Brachot, Brussels. May 22 - June 29. (exh. cat.)
- 1993: Magasin 3 Stockholm Konsthalle, Stockholm. March 18 - June 4. (exh. cat.)
- 1995: Luhring Augustine, New York City. Fall.
- 1997: Mario Diacono Gallery, Boston. April 19 - May 24
- 1997: Luhring Augustine, New York City. January 11 - February 8
- 2003-04: Mario Diacono Gallery, Boston. November 7, 2003 - January 3, 2004
- 2004: MoMA PS1, New York City, 24 September – 17 October. (exh. cat.)
- 2004: Printemps de Septembre at the Church of the Jacobins, Toulouse, France. In Extremis. Curated by Jean- Marc Bustamante and Pascal Pique.
- 2007: Galleria Michela Rizzo, Venice. June 6 - September 15. (exh. cat.)
- 2007: SITE Santa Fe, Santa Fe, New Mexico. One-Person Exhibition curated by Laura Heon. February 10 - May 13. (exh. cat.)
- 2008: De Pury & Luxembourg, Zurich. June 2 - August 16
- 2009: Salon 94 Freemans, New York City. Masterpieces. October 29 - December 12
- 2011: Ca' Rezzonico, Venice. Portraits and Masterpieces. 4 June – 6 November. (In conjunction with the 54th International Art Exhibition—la Biennale di Venezia.)
- 2012: Galerie Nathalie Obadia, Gallery II, Paris. Barry X Ball: Matthew Barney / Barry X Ball Dual-Dual Portrait. 17 March – 16 May.
- 2012: Museo Nazionale di Palazzo Mansi, Lucca, Italy. Barry X Ball: The Obsession with the Object (L’Ossessione dell’Oggetto). 17 October – 17 November.
- 2014-15: McCabe Fine Art, Stockholm, Sweden. Masterpieces. November 20 - December 20 and January 7 - 15, 2015.
- 2015: 100 Tonson Gallery, Bangkok, Thailand. Barry X Ball: Portraits and Photos. January 15 - March 29
- 2018: Castello Sforzesco / Museum of Ancient Art, Milan, Italy. Barry X Ball: Pietà. April 12 - February 10
- 2018-19: Villa Panza (FAI – Italian National Trust Space), Varese, Italy. A major retrospective of Barry’s works presenting 56 of his works produced since 1983. April 12 - February 10
- 2019: Venice, Italy. Ca’ Pesaro International Museum of Modern Art. Medardo Rosso Project. A collateral exhibition of the 2019 Venice Biennale of Art. May 8 – September 22
- 2019: Mnuchin Gallery, New York City. Barry X Ball. Solo presentation of three recent sculptures. 1 November – 14 December
- 2020: Nasher Sculpture Center, Dallas, Texas. A comprehensive solo exhibition of new and loaned works that will travel to other institutions. January 25 – April 19

== Collections ==
Ball's work is held in the following public collections:

- Hammer Museum, California, USA
- San Francisco Museum of Modern Art, California, USA
- Fonds régional d'art contemporain de Bretagne, France
- Magasin 3 Stockholm Konsthalle, Sweden
- The Maramotti Collection, Italy
- Museo Cantonale d’Arte, Lugano, Switzerland
- Museo di arte moderna e contemporanea di Trento e Rovereto, Italy
- Norton Museum of Art, Palm Beach, Florida, USA
- The Berlingieri Collection, Italy
- The Thomas Olbricht Collection, Germany
- The Panza Collection, Italy/Switzerland
