= Walead Beshty =

American photographer (born 1976)

Walead Beshty (born 1976) is a Los Angeles–based artist and writer.

Beshty has taught at numerous schools including University of California, Los Angeles; University of California, Irvine; the California Institute of the Arts; School of the Art Institute of Chicago; Art Center College of Design, Pasadena; and the MFA Program at Bard College. Beshty has exhibited widely in numerous institutions and galleries around the world. Beshty is visiting faculty at the Southern California Institute of Architecture. Walead Beshty is represented by Galerie Eva Presenhuber, Petzel Gallery, and Thomas Dane Gallery.

== Education ==
Beshty earned a Bachelor of Arts from Bard College in 1999, and a Master of Fine Arts from Yale University School of Art in 2002.

== Practice ==
"Games aren't constituted with a particular outcome. Games are constituted by the rules that are used ... It isn't whether or not it produces one sort of outcome, but how all these rules react to one another and how it defines a set of relationships. In that same way, I don't think of any particular object as being particularly significant. It's much more the system that generates it."

"Art itself has the potential to democratize aesthetics and reimagine aesthetic production as communal, available and non-hierarchical. I like the idea of demystifying aesthetics by communicating that we can all make aesthetic objects; it's not simply for those with capital or power."

"Objects have no meaning in themselves, rather they are prompts for a field of possible meanings that are dependent on context … That is, objects facilitate certain outcomes to arise that are not wholly predictable. These interactions accumulate over time, thus the meaning of an object is ever evolving."

" … you can't produce negatively, production is an active, cumulative process."

"I'm not interested in a grand definition of a particular medium—some sort of ontological construction—but in the particular expression of a set of relations within specific contexts. I think I'm most interested in the translation of abstract ideas—from abstraction in general to the materially specific. I'm very sensitive to abstractions, but I don't want to traffic in them."

"I only try to not conceal the process, make it available; I don't look to reveal it. I simply try to make work that considers how it materially came into being, whose appearance is directly and transparently linked to that coming into being. I think that viewers can engage with work on multiple levels; I don't want to teach a lesson or provide a recipe, but I actively try not to conceal. Power works by concealing how it functions, by enforcing a ritual, naturalizing it. This makes the means through which power functions camouflaged, and power itself sublime. I try to avoid this as much as possible, and part of this is to situate the production of the work in a public or common structure, one that is accessible, ubiquitous, instead of tacitly claiming artistic inspiration or selfhood as a justification for a work"

== Works ==
Although Beshty is known for his work in photography, his bodies of work span a large variety of media including sculpture, painting, installation, and video. In regard to medium distinctions, he has emphasized that he "tr[ies] to consider each body of work on its own terms, discretely, so terms like 'sculpture' or 'photography,' in their broad sense, don't really enter into [his] thinking … "

=== Travel Pictures ===
The series of large-format photographs documents an abandoned Iraqi diplomatic office located in former East Berlin, itself vacated to the West by the German Democratic Republic in 1990. Before photographing the site, Beshty's unexposed film was damaged by airport security X-ray machines while traveling to Berlin. Having discovered this, he proceeded to use the film and pass it through the scanners once again on his return journey. This generated images with "large washes of color … superimposed over them" of a site "denatured of its sovereignty and exposed to the elements," The set of nine works was first shown at the Hammer Museum in Los Angeles in 2006, and has been shown in exhibitions worldwide including in the 2008 Biennial Exhibition at the Whitney Museum of American Art in New York. In 2012, the artist hole-punched the original nine negatives from the series, and prints of these works, under the title ~~Travel Pictures~~, were shown alongside the original series at Thomas Dane Gallery in London.

=== Transparencies ===
Following the concept of the Travel Pictures series, Beshty began traveling with unexposed 4 x 5 transparency film in his luggage, thereby exposing the film to the high-powered airport X-ray scanners. In his essay on Beshty's work for the book Walead Beshty: Selected Correspondences 2001–2010 (Damiani Editore, 2010), Jason E. Smith describes the Transparencies as "consist[ing] of grainy, virtually monochrome fields of degraded color (lavenders, pinks, plums, scarlets, turquoise; but also steely grays and charcoal blues) bisected edge-to-edge by either white bands that evoke shafts of soft light or, inversely, deep graphite grays resembling cast shadows … The Transparencies ... originate in the very public, transitional space of the international airport, a very specific form of public space saturated with techniques of surveillance, monitoring, and scanning, and an in-between space situated in the intervals between sovereign states and their relatively unambiguous juridical frameworks."

In 2009, the works were featured in Altermodern: The Tate Triennial. In a dialog with the exhibition curator Nicolas Bourriaud published in the exhibition catalog, Beshty comments on the conditions of the airport and air travel, stating, "In this constellation of forces, the x-ray has pride of place, delineating the edge between the 'real' world, and the siteless limbo of air travel. Its accidental discovery in the late 1800s fits seamlessly into modernity's fascination with transparency: the desire to capture the minutiae of movement (cinema), to turn objects into surface (photography), to see inside (x-ray)."

=== Photograms ===
In 2005, Beshty began production of his first photogram works based on a possible yet undocumented series of work by Lázló Moholy-Nagy. Recalling a conversation with Moholy-Nagy's grandson, Beshty describes the hypothesized Moholy-Nagy photograms as "a series of works using nothing more than crumpled photographic paper … The works were logically deduced to have most likely been made in 1921," yet no record of such a series existed at the time. Through this conversation, a title was also hypothesized for the works, "Abstraction Made by My Hand with the Assistance of Light." Beshty's photograms, individually titled "Picture Made by My Hand with the Assistance of Light," were made by exposing crumpled black and white photographic paper to light.

Subsequent black and white and color photogram series have been produced using similar processes, which Beshty describes as "multiple tracings of a three-dimensional object on the field of the photograph. The resulting photograph is both a depiction of the photographic paper and the paper itself, as the paper casts an image of itself onto itself through the exposure process." In response to the photogram works being described as abstract, Beshty states that "Any standard, lens-based, figurative photograph is necessarily 'abstract' in the technical sense of the term. Since this separation of sign and signified does not exist in my works, they are never true abstractions, regardless of their appearance. This type of art object should be referred to as 'concrete' and 'literal,' as the viewer is always presented with the referent and the image at the same time. They are concrete photographs (with a lower case 'c'), not abstract or pictorial photographs."

In more recent series, including the Color Curls and Black Curls, Beshty exposes color photographic paper to cyan, magenta, and yellow, "use of this system of color describes the field of all possible colors in the interaction between the primary subtractive colors." The unexposed paper is "curled" onto a metal wall in total darkness and kept in place with large magnets. The paper is then exposed to the colored light by a horizontal enlarger and processed with a large-format color processor. The final work "is not only the result of the tension between the size of the paper, the confines of the darkroom, and the artist's own body, but also the effects of the architectural infrastructure (i.e., the HVAC system, building vibration, etc.), which is expressed through the registration (or misregistration) of the colors."

=== FedEx works ===
First produced in 2007, the FedEx works are made of either laminated glass (clear or two-way mirror) or raw polished copper constructed to the size of standardized FedEx shipping boxes. The works are then shipped to their destination by FedEx's Express service. The glass works are shipped inside FedEx shipping boxes of the same size, which act as both part of the work and a support for the glass portion when exhibited. The glass works are shipped unprotected, so that cracks appear with each successive shipment. The polished copper works are shipped without a standard FedEx box, so that any handling by the courier imprints onto the surface of the work by oxidation. The FedEx waybills, customs documentation, and any shipping stickers added to the box are considered part of the work.

Beshty states that he was "initially interested … because they're defined by a corporate entity in legal terms. There's a copyright designating the design of each FedEx box, but there's also the corporate ownership over that very shape. It's a proprietary volume of space, distinct from the design of the box, which is identified through what's called a SSCC #, a Serial Shipping Container Code. I considered this volume as my starting point; the perversity of a corporation owning a shape—not just the design of the object—and also the fact that the volume is actually separate from the box. They're owned independently from one another. Furthermore, I was interested in how art objects acquire meaning through their context and through travel, what [Daniel] Buren called, something like, 'the unbearable compromise of the portable work of art.' So, I wanted to make a work that was specifically organized around its traffic, becoming materially manifest through its movement from one place to another." The curator and writer Nicolas Bourriaud describes Beshty's work more generally in a text included in Beshty's monograph Natural Histories, " … as being made up of images or objects that 'remember' their previous or initial state, that have memorized or archived their course. The FedEx series is an explicit example … the form is literally produced by its incorporation into a system of distribution (FedEx), and through its capacity to record a trajectory."

=== Selected Works ===
Beshty produced the first Selected Works pieces as a part of his 2008 exhibition in Los Angeles, Science Concrète. These works were produced by shredding the photographic works that were produced for the exhibition but not included, and the pulp was then molded into "quasi-architectonic forms, from old print boxes and the like … " During the run of exhibition, Beshty shredded the unused works in the back room of the gallery and left them to dry on a large table in the middle of the room. Once dry, the works were added to the exhibition. Since 2008, Beshty has produced the Selected Works as wall panels in various sizes framed in polished copper. He says of the work, "This line of work … reflects the fact that even though I always end up not showing a lot of the work I produce, I still need to account for the discarded pieces in some way. I like to think of the entire process as sort of an ecology in itself, which extends way beyond objects. The final products are not alone important. I feel a need to include the by-products, all of which never make it to the final show, and to figure out a way they can reach the exhibition site."

=== Mirrored Floor works ===
Beshty's Mirrored Floor works consist of laminated, layered mirrored glass floor panels installed edge-to-edge to cover the entirety of an exhibition space including staff offices. The panels crack and break under the weight of viewers during the course of the exhibition. On the occasion of an early installation of the work, the curator Jacob Proctor noted that the work is "both an instant reflection and a constantly evolving record of traffic and circulation through the gallery at every stage of the exhibition process. It is also a work in progress … Every visitor to the exhibition therefore becomes an active participant in the creative process … what the floor demarcates is a zone in which a circulation of bodies is registered."

=== Copper Surrogate works ===
Made from mirror-polished raw copper, the Copper Surrogate works are produced to the size of the existing working surfaces and desks of an exhibition venue. The Copper Surrogates replace the existing working surfaces for a period of an exhibition cycle, and the surfaces are used by the staff as they normally would be, "… traces of the manual work performed upon these tabletops registers upon their surfaces as a process of touch … " Once the exhibition cycle is complete, the Copper Surrogates are considered complete and are hung as wall works for exhibition. In a 2014 Artforum review of works from the series, Tina Kukielski notes, "the 'Copper Surrogates' are indexical. In raw polished copper, [Beshty] has found the equivalent of the photograph's light-sensitive paper. But rather than record inscriptions of light, the material registers the elbow grease of the gallery system … actively shar[ing] authorship with the system's necessary and essential producers." Beshty describes the active production of the work as "trac[ing] the immaterial labor of discourse, transaction, and negotiation that occurs across these surfaces, whether between insiders (for example, the discussion between a curator and a gallerist) or with a public (for example the interaction between a gallery receptionist and a visitor to the exhibition). In each of these instances, the meaning of the work is being constructed incrementally in both large and small ways, and is distributed by those individuals who engage across those surfaces."

In 2014, Beshty exhibited large Copper Surrogate works made from 10 x 5-foot standard industrial sheets of polished copper folded equally in half in various angles. Instead of being produced and marked as a desk or working surface, these works were handled by their installers leaving marks from the installation process on their surfaces that differed based on the sculpture's shape, scale, and mass.

=== A Partial Disassembling of an Invention without a Future: Helter-Skelter and Random Notes in which the Pulleys and Cogwheels Are Lying around at Random All over the Workbench ===
Beginning in 2013, Beshty began production on a more than yearlong project that catalogues every used or exhausted object in his studio with cyanotype photogram prints on discarded papers, cardboard, wood, or any other cellulose-based material culled from his studio. The materials contain "private correspondences, interactions with the museum, and so on. Every detail—personal, professional, everything—is actually in the work itself, and what's more, it is what it is. It's debris, it depicts debris; it's a work, it depicts making a work." The resulting piece was installed in 2014 on the 90-meter long wall of the Barbican Centre's Curve gallery from ceiling to floor. The last month of the project, Beshty produced cyanotypes in residence at the Barbican Centre with discarded items from the venue. Over 12,000 cyanotype prints were produced and presented in chronological order. Beshty states that the work "tells a very broad picture of the different productive forces that are moved through the studio. In that sense, I thought of the studio as … a machine for making a kind of picture … It's a transparent picture. It's a picture that shows exactly how it came into being, everything that was involved, every relationship, both the productive forces in terms of mechanical things—machinery and technology—but also the social relationships. And I think that's particularly important in art as well, that a large part of what makes an artwork is also the social relations between individuals, the people that come together and make something happen." The title for the work was taken from a title proposed in a 1979 lecture by Hollis Frampton "in which he discusses how meaning is opened up when a thing's currency has passed … that dormant things have a great deal of potential."

== Collaborations ==
In 2009, Beshty collaborated with the artist Karl Haendel for the exhibition Plug 'n Play at Redling Fine Art in Los Angeles, and in 2010 he collaborated on an exhibition, LaterLayer, with the architecture firm Johnston Marklee. In 2013, Beshty began production on works in collaboration with the artist Kelley Walker. The artists' works have been exhibited at Redling Fine Art in Los Angeles (Walead Beshty + Kelley Walker: Hardbody Software, 2014) and at Paula Cooper Gallery in New York (Walead Beshty + Kelley Walker: Crystal Voyager, 2014).

== Exhibitions ==
Beshty's work has been shown in hundreds of exhibitions worldwide, including institutions such as the Jewish Museum, New York; the Museum of Contemporary Art, Los Angeles; the Whitney Museum of American Art, New York; the Museum of Contemporary Art, Chicago; the Museum of Modern Art, New York; Kunsthalle Basel, Switzerland; Tate Britain, London; Deichtorhallen Hamburg, Germany; and the Guggenheim Museum, New York and Bilbao, among others. He has had solo exhibitions at the Barbican Centre, London; Malmö Konsthall, Sweden; Centro de Arte Dos de Mayo, Madrid; Ullens Center for Contemporary Art, Beijing; the Hirshhorn Museum and Sculpture Garden, Washington, D.C.; the University of Michigan Museum of Art, Ann Arbor; the Hammer Museum, Los Angeles; and PS1 Contemporary Art Center, New York.

Beshty's work has been included in the 56th La Biennale Venezia (2015), the Shanghai Biennial (2012), the Montréal Biennial (2011), the Tate Triennial (2009), the Whitney Biennial (2008), and the California Biennial (2006 and 2008).

== Curatorial projects ==
Beshty has organized a number of group exhibitions including Picture Industry: A Provisional History of the Technical Image, 1844–2018, Luma Arles, Arles, France (2018); Picture Industry at Hessel Museum, Center for Curatorial Studies, Bard College, Annandale-on-Hudson, New York (2017); Picture Industry, as part of Systematically Open? New Forms for Contemporary Image Production, LUMA Arles, Arles, France (2016); A Machinery for Living at Petzel gallery, New York (2014); On the Matter of Abstraction (figs. A & B) at the Rose Museum of Art at Brandeis University, Waltham, Massachusetts (2013, co-curated with Christopher Bedford); Sunless (Journeys in Alta California since 1933) at Thomas Dane Gallery, London (2010); Picture Industry (Goodbye to All That) at Regen Projects, Los Angeles (2010); The Gold Standard at PS1 Contemporary Art Center, New York (2006, co-curated with Bob Nickas); and Pictures Are the Problem at Pelham Art Center, Pelham, New York (2005), among others.

== Public collections ==
Beshty's work is held in permanent museum collections worldwide, including:

- Art Institute of Chicago, Chicago, Illinois
- Solomon R. Guggenheim Museum, New York
- Hammer Museum, Los Angeles, California
- Hirshhorn Museum and Sculpture Garden, Washington, D.C.
- Los Angeles County Museum of Art
- Museum of Contemporary Art, Chicago, Chicago, Illinois
- Museum of Contemporary Art, Los Angeles, California
- Museum of Modern Art, New York
- San Francisco Museum of Modern Art, San Francisco, California
- Tate, London, United Kingdom
- University of Michigan Museum of Art, Ann Arbor, Michigan
- Victoria and Albert Museum, London
- Whitney Museum of American Art, New York

== Writing ==
Beshty has written on a variety of media, including essays on cinema, painting, sculpture, and photography. In addition, he has authored many monographic texts on artists such as Jay DeFeo, Sharon Lockhart, Kelley Walker, Luisa Lambri, Annette Kelm, and Michael Asher, among others. Essays by Beshty have been published in Afterall, Aperture, Artforum, Cabinet, Parkett, and Texte zur Kunst; and in anthologies including Akademie X (Phaidon, 2015), The Painting Factory (Museum of Contemporary Art/Rizzoli, 2012), Chance: Documents of Contemporary Art (Whitechapel/MIT, 2010), and Words without Pictures (LACMA, 2009) among others. Beshty has also edited a number of publications including Ethics: Documents of Contemporary Art (Whitechapel/MIT, 2015) and Blind Spot 46 (Photo-Based Art, 2013).

== Publications ==
- Walead Beshty: Pulleys, Cogwheels, Mirrors, and Windows. University of Michigan Museum of Art. Published on the occasion of the eponymous exhibition in 2009.
- Walead Beshty: Selected Correspondences 2001–2010. Damiani Editore, 2010. Three bodies of work: Scenes from Tschaikowskistrasse 17, his Travel Picture works, and selections of his Transparency works. With texts by Jason E. Smith and Peter Eleey.
- Walead Beshty and Johnston Marklee: LaterLayer. Depart Foundation, 2010. Published on the occasion of Beshty's collaborative exhibition with the architecture firm Johnston Marklee. presented at the Italian Cultural Institute of Los Angeles.
- Walead Beshty: Natural Histories. JRP Ringier, 2011. Published on the occasion of the survey exhibition Walead Beshty: A Diagram of Forces at Malmö Konsthall, Sweden and Centro de Arte Dos de Mayo, Madrid. With texts by Suzanne Hudson, Nicolas Bourriaud, and an interview with Bob Nickas.
  - Second, expanded edition. 2014. With interventions by Beshty, including additional plates and texts
- Lionel Bovier, ed., Walead Beshty: 33 Texts: 93,614 Words: 581,035 Characters: Selected Writings (2003–2015). Positions Series, JRP|Ringier and Les presses du réel, 2016. Introduction by George Baker.
- Walead Beshty: Procedurals, Petzel 2014–2017. DISTANZ, 2017.
- Industrial Portraits: Volume One, 2008–2012. JRP|Ringier, 2017. Introduction by Hans Ulrich Obrist.
- Picture Industry: A Provisional History of the Technical Image 1844–2018. JRP|Ringier, 2018. Edited by Beshty, published with LUMA and CCS Bard on the occasion of the exhibition Picture Industry, LUMA, Arles, October 12, 2018 – January 6, 2019.
- Walead Beshty: Work in Exhibition, 2011–2020. Koenig Books, 2017. Published on the occasion of the survey exhibition "Walead Beshty: Standard Deviations" at Musée d'art moderne et contemporain, Geneva, and Kunst Museum Winterthur, Switzerland. With texts by Noam M. Elcott, Walead Beshty, Hamza Walker, Lionel Bovier, and Lynn Kost.
- Addenda to a Sequence of Appearances: Walead Beshty Studios Inc. at Dane Chantala Associates Ltd., 2009–2023. Hurtwood Press, 2023.
