= Araya Rasdjarmrearnsook =

Thai artist

- Born: 1957 (age 68–69); Trat, Thailand
- Education: Silpakorn University; Braunschweig University of Art
- Known for: Video installation; Photographic art; Sculpture

Araya Rasdjarmrearnsook (born 1957) is a Thai artist who works primarily with film and video. She currently lives in Chiang Mai, Thailand.

== Early life and education ==
Araya Rasdjarmrearnsook was born in Trat, Thailand, in 1957. At the age of three, she lost her mother as the result of a forced childbirth which was assisted by her physician father, and eight days after, the newborn sister. Three years after the death of her mother, Rasdjarmrearnsook found herself in his father's new household where she would again face deaths of family members in 1963. As a training instructed by her father, she wrote texts summarising happenings that appeared in the newspaper Siam Rath. Her grandmother, who died in 1987, was a maternal figure to the artist, and the bonding was an important inspiration for the artist's first published short story. Araya listed the death date of her parents and her grandmother on her curriculum vitae, indicating the importance of including autobiographical and collective experience in her work.

Rasdjarmrearnsook received her Bachelor of Fine Arts and Master of Fine Arts degrees in graphic art from Silpakorn University, Bangkok, in 1986. From 1988 to 1990, she was on a scholarship awarded by the Deutsche Akademischer Austausch Dienst (DAAD) to study for a diploma at the Hochschule für Bildende Künste, Braunschweig (HBK Braunschweig) where she was a student of Malte Sartorius and Karl-Christoph Schulz. As a Konrad Adenauer Stiftung Scholar, she shifted her study focus to sculpture at HBK Braunschweig, given her dissatisfaction with the conservative Thai print-making scene, her wish to carry out new experiments, and that she had been rejected by a sculpture department in Thailand. Prior to her studies in Germany, she went to a boarding school for girls and studied at the Bangkok-based Chang Silpa College of Fine Art.

== Artworks ==
Araya Rasdjarmrearnsook experimented with intaglio printmaking and sculptural installations in the 1980s and 1990s, before starting to focus in on film and video.

Several of her early sculptural installations have been interpreted as speaking to the position of women in Thai society. In Isolated Hands (1992) and Departure of Thai Country Girls (1995), dismembered parts of female-coded bodies are presented in isolation; in the former, a pair of hands rest on a plate of water, and in the latter, pairs of upside-down legs are lined up on a wooden boat. In Isolated Moral Female Object, in a Relationship with a Male Bird II (1995), an isolated woman's head gazes out through a circular frame containing an image of the sky, while a sculptural bird flies freely through the frame.

In the late 1990s and 2000s, Rasdjarmrearnsook began to bring the rituals of the dead into her practice, accompanied by a shift to video work. She created a series of video works dealing with human corpses. This involved her filming her own rituals for the dead at morgues, in collaboration with the medical community. This includes works like A Walk (1996, 2003), Reading for Corpses, (2002), Chant for Female Corpse (2001, 2002), Sudsiri and Araya (2002), I'm Living (2003), Wind Princess, White Birds (2006), the Conversation series (2005) and The Class series (2005). In The Class (2005), for example, she gives a tutorial to six corpses who are lined up in morgue trays.

In her series Two Planets (2008) and Village and Elsewhere (2011), Rasdjarmrearnsook looked at the interactions between viewers and artworks when placing reproductions of iconic Western paintings in rural areas in Thailand. In Two Planets (2007–08), a group of locals in a Thai countryside are presented with reproductions of 19th-century European paintings. They sit with their backs to the camera and their unpretentious reflections on the artworks are subtitled in English.

Rasdjarmrearnsook is well known for her writing as well as for her visual art. The artist has said, "I write and make visual art for my spiritual survival. Both help me approach states of mind that I cannot attain in real life. The difference between writing and making art is a question of process, time and the way both reach the viewers and readers".

== Exhibitions ==
Rasdjarmrearnsook represented Thailand at the 51st Venice Biennale in 2005, and exhibited at dOCUMENTA(13) in Kassel, Germany, in 2012.

In January 2015, her first retrospective in the United States opened at SculptureCenter, New York.

=== Solo exhibitions ===
Rasdjarmrearnsook's solo exhibitions include:

- National Gallery, Bangkok (1987, 1992, 1994, 1995, and 2002)
- Tensta Konsthall, Stockholm (2003)
- Bass Museum of Art, Miami Beach (2012)
- Walters Art Museum, Baltimore (2012)
- Denver Art Museum, Denver (2013-14)
- SculptureCenter, New York (2015)

=== Group exhibitions ===
- 2013 Jakarta Biennale, Jakarta, Indonesia
- 2012 dOCUMENTA (13), Kassel
- 2012 Phantoms of Asia, San Francisco, United States
- 2010 17th Biennale of Sydney, Sydney, Australia
- 2006 Gwangju Biennale, Gwangju
- 2006 Kunstmuseum Bern, Bern, Switzerland
- 2005 51st Venice Biennale, Venice, Italy
- 2004 Carnegie International, Pittsburgh
- 2003 8th Istanbul Biennale, Istanbul, Turkey
- 1995 1st Johannesburg Biennale, Johannesburg, South Africa
- 1993 1st Asia-Pacific Triennial, Brisbane, Australia
