= Dead Outlaw =

2024 musical by David Yazbek, Erik Della Penna, and Itamar Moses

- Off-Broadway Promotional Poster
- Music: David Yazbek; Erik Della Penna
- Lyrics: David Yazbek; Erik Della Penna
- Book: Itamar Moses
- Basis: Inspired by the life of Elmer McCurdy
- Premiere: March 10, 2024: Minetta Lane Theatre
- Productions: 2024 Off-Broadway; 2025 Broadway

Dead Outlaw is a musical with music and lyrics by David Yazbek and Erik Della Penna and a book by Itamar Moses. It is inspired by the life of Elmer McCurdy. It premiered in 2024 at the Minetta Lane Theatre. The musical was originally conceived by Yazbek. It opened on Broadway at the Longacre Theatre on April 27, 2025.

== Plot summary ==
An omniscient Bandleader begins to tell the story of Elmer McCurdy, "the Dead Outlaw". In the early 1900s, McCurdy lazes around a campfire with a group of fellow outlaws ("Ballad"). Hearing a distant train, he alerts the others as they prepare to rob it. In 1976, a Teamsters member working on an episode of The Six Million Dollar Man at The Pike amusement zone on the Long Beach pier discovers a prop body hanging in a ride is a real human corpse, triggering a media frenzy as the police try to determine the body's identity ("Dead").

The story flashes back to Elmer's childhood in late 1800s Maine, where he imagines himself as a Wild West outlaw, living with his parents and his "aunt". Elmer's father dies suddenly, and his mother reveals he is actually his "aunt's" son, and he is sent away to live with her. Elmer runs away and sets out to build a new life. He drinks heavily and often starts bar fights. He arrives in Iola, Kansas, where he meets Maggie Johnson and takes a job as a plumber under William Root, having learned basic plumbing skills in his youth. He and Maggie fall in love and for a few years it looks like he has a normal life ahead of him ("Normal"). Eventually, Elmer grows restless and picks a fight with his co-worker Louis, claiming that he is a murderer ("Killed a Man in Maine"). Though the Bandleader points out this was likely not true, Louis tells Root, who fires Elmer, and Elmer leaves town without saying goodbye to Maggie ("Dead" (reprise)).

Elmer continues to travel finding different jobs, including a stint in a coal mine and at one point joining the Army Engineer Corps. At the end of his service he and a fellow soldier scheme to rob a nearby house and get rich ("Nobody Knows Your Name"), but they are caught red-handed with their tools before they can do so. While in jail, he meets a robber named Walter Jarrett who upon learning of Elmer's background as an engineer invites him to join his family of robbers, using his training with explosives to help them crack open safes. Elmer successfully convinces the judge his tools were actually for a piece of army equipment and joins the Jarretts. However, despite trying to recall his training on nitroglycerin usage under General Douglas MacArthur ("Blowin' It Up") he repeatedly fails to crack any safes. The Jarretts give him one last chance when Elmer proposes robbing a train in Oklahoma delivering money to the Osage tribe, but during the attempt discover they found the wrong train ("Indian Train"). The Jarretts abandon Elmer for his uselessness. The law finally tracks down Elmer, and he is killed in a standoff with an Oklahoma sheriff, just as he had once dreamed. As he dies, he expresses relief that his indignities in life are finally over ("Leave Me Be").

Elmer's body is taken to Coroner Joseph L. Johnson's morgue, where Johnson performs an autopsy. He preserves the body with arsenic while placing expensive ads in newspapers throughout the country, seeking a family member to come claim the body and reimburse him for the expenses. Maggie comes and mourns Elmer ("A Stranger"), but Johnson cannot release the body to her as she is not family. Visitors start showing up at the morgue to see the body with increasingly fantastical tales of his identity and exploits. Johnson and his assistant decide they can recoup some costs by charging to see the body. They prop the body up in an open coffin and put a rifle in his hands. ("Something From Nothing"). Five years later, two men arrive at the morgue, claiming to be Elmer's brothers ("Our Dear Brother") and seeking to have the body released to them. Johnson sees through the ruse but accepts a bribe, and the Patterson brothers take the body for their circus. Elmer's body then sees a variety of "jobs" in sideshows ("Somethin' 'Bout a Mummy"). In one of those "jobs," the mummy is used in the 1928 Trans-America Footrace as a sideshow to entertain onlookers aside from the race itself. The eventual winner of the race, a Cherokee man named Andy Payne, tells his own story of saving his family's farm by running the race and winning the prize money. The organizer of the race and sideshow, C. C. Pyle, offers to be Payne's agent, but when Payne sees Elmer's body on display at the sideshow he takes "the mummy's good advice," declining the offer and going home ("Andy Payne").

Elmer then ends up in the hands of a filmmaker, Dwain Esper, who uses him as a prop in an assortment of movies. ("Somethin' 'Bout a Mummy" (reprise)) He keeps the mummy in his home, where his daughter Millicent is briefly shocked but then comes to treat Elmer as a friend and confidant throughout her childhood ("Millicent's Song"). Elmer eventually ends up in a wax museum comparing criminals and presidents. He briefly revives to the audience to express his frustration over how his body continues to decay over the years, but when visitors start trying to stick items in his mouth the owners wire his jaw shut, silencing him again ("Nobody Knows Your Name" (reprise)). After many more years of being a sideshow or stuffed in a closet, Elmer's mummy is painted day-glo red and hanged from a noose as a prop in a ride at The Pike. The LA County coroner Thomas Noguchi, who has performed autopsies on such celebrities as Natalie Wood, Sharon Tate, and Marilyn Monroe ("Up to the Stars"), receives the body after its discovery. He successfully identifies Elmer but, lacking any next of kin, the city decides to cremate his remains. However, citizens of Pawhuska, Oklahoma arrive, offering to claim Elmer as their own so they may give him a proper burial ("Our Dear Brother" (reprise)). Noguchi, weary of Elmer continuing to be exploited, agrees on the condition that his service be a somber one, and he be buried in six feet of concrete so his body may never be touched again. They oblige and Elmer is finally laid to rest ("Crimson Thread"). The band reminds the audience that they too will one day die, and to think about how we are treated after our deaths ("Dead" (Finale)).

== Production history ==
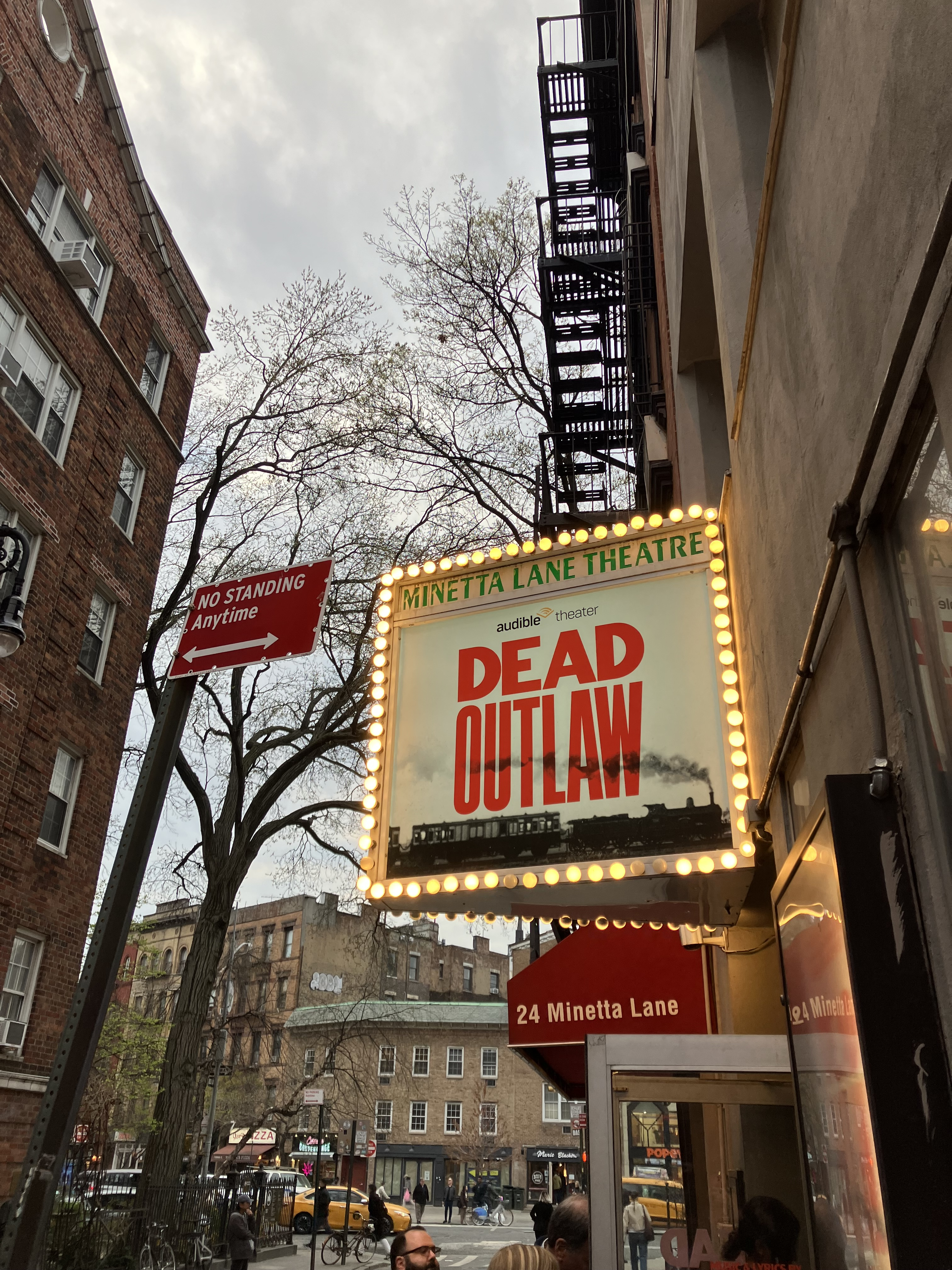
Dead Outlaw at the Minetta Lane Theatre

=== Off-Broadway (2024) ===
Previews for Dead Outlaw began on February 28, 2024, at the Minetta Lane Theatre. The world premiere of Dead Outlaw opened days later on March 10. The production concluded its run on April 14. The production featured direction by David Cromer with orchestrations and arrangements by Della Penna, Yazbek, and Dean Sharenow, scenic design by Arnulfo Maldonado, costume design by Sarah Laux, lighting design by Heather Gilbert, and sound design by Kai Harada and Josh Millican. The production received eleven Drama Desk Award nominations, winning three, including Outstanding Musical, Outstanding Book of a Musical, and Outstanding Lyrics. After previously announcing an October 2025 release date, Audible, who commissioned and produced the musical, announced that their recording of the show's off-Broadway engagement would be released on July 17, 2025, with a traditional cast recording to be released at a later date.

=== Broadway (2025) ===
On December 19, 2024, it was announced that the musical would transfer to the Longacre Theatre. The show began previews on April 12, 2025 and opened on April 27 with the original off-Broadway cast reprising their roles. The production's final performance was on June 29, 2025.

== Cast and characters ==
Character	Off Broadway	Broadway
Character	2024	2025
Elmer McCurdy	Andrew Durand	Andrew Durand
Helen McCurdy Maggie Johnson Millicent Esper	Julia Knitel	Julia Knitel
Thomas Noguchi James Patterson	Thom Sesma	Thom Sesma
Coroner Joseph L. Johnson Dwain Esper	Eddie Cooper	Eddie Cooper
Bandleader Walter Jarrett	Jeb Brown	Jeb Brown
Louis Charles Patterson CC Pyle	Dashiell Eaves	Dashiell Eaves
William Root Douglas MacArthur George McCurdy Louis Sonney	Ken Marks	Ken Marks
Andy Payne Luke Johnson Dan Sonney	Trent Saunders	Trent Saunders

== Musical numbers ==
- "Ballad" - Elmer
- "Dead" - Bandleader
- "Normal"ǂ - Bandleader and Elmer
- "Normal" (reprise)ǂ - Elmer and Maggie
- "Killed a Man in Maine" - Elmer
- "Dead" (reprise) - Bandleader
- "Nobody Knows Your Name" - Elmer and Army Friend
- "Blowin' It Up" - MacArthur and Elmer
- "Indian Train" - Elmer and Ensemble
- "Leave Me Be" - Elmer
- "A Stranger" - Maggie
- "Something From Nothing" - Johnson and Ensemble
- "Our Dear Brother" - Johnson, James, and Charles
- "Somethin' 'Bout a Mummy" - James, Charles, Louis, and Ensemble
- "Andy Payne" - Andy and Ensemble
- "Somethin' 'Bout a Mummy" (reprise) - Louis and Dwain
- "Millicent's Song" - Millicent
- "Nobody Knows Your Name" (reprise)† - Elmer and Bandleader
- "Up to the Stars" - Noguchi
- "Our Dear Brother" (reprise) - Oklahoma Delegation
- "Crimson Thread" - Bandleader, Elmer, and Ensemble
- "Dead" (Finale) - Bandleader

Keys

† Not included on the cast recording.

ǂ Split into two tracks on the cast recording, Listed together in the Playbill

== Awards and nominations ==
=== 2024 Off-Broadway production ===
Year	Award	Category	Nominee	Result
2024	Drama Desk Awards	Outstanding Musical		Won
2024	Drama Desk Awards	Outstanding Book of a Musical	Itamar Moses	Won
2024	Drama Desk Awards	Outstanding Music	David Yazbek and Erik Della Penna	Nominated
2024	Drama Desk Awards	Outstanding Lyrics	David Yazbek and Erik Della Penna	Won
2024	Drama Desk Awards	Outstanding Lead Performance in a Musical	Andrew Durand	Nominated
2024	Drama Desk Awards	Outstanding Featured Performance in a Musical	Thom Sesma	Nominated
2024	Drama Desk Awards	Outstanding Direction of a Musical	David Cromer	Nominated
2024	Drama Desk Awards	Outstanding Scenic Design of a Musical	Arnulfo Maldonado	Nominated
2024	Drama Desk Awards	Outstanding Lighting Design of a Musical	Heather Gilbert	Nominated
2024	Drama Desk Awards	Outstanding Orchestrations	Erik Della Penna, Dean Sharenow, David Yazbek	Nominated
2024	Drama League Awards	Outstanding Production of a Musical		Nominated
2024	Drama League Awards	Outstanding Direction of a Musical	David Cromer	Nominated
2024	Lucille Lortel Awards	Outstanding Musical		Nominated
2024	Lucille Lortel Awards	Outstanding Director	David Cromer	Nominated
2024	Lucille Lortel Awards	Outstanding Lead Performer in a Musical	Jeb Brown	Nominated
2024	Lucille Lortel Awards	Outstanding Lead Performer in a Musical	Andrew Durand	Nominated
2024	Lucille Lortel Awards	Outstanding Featured Performer in a Musical	Thom Sesma	Nominated
2024	Lucille Lortel Awards	Outstanding Scenic Design	Arnulfo Maldonado	Nominated
2024	Outer Critics Circle Awards	Outstanding New Off-Broadway Musical		Won
2024	Outer Critics Circle Awards	Outstanding Lead Performer in an Off-Broadway Musical	Jeb Brown	Nominated
2024	Outer Critics Circle Awards	Outstanding Lead Performer in an Off-Broadway Musical	Andrew Durand	Won
2024	Outer Critics Circle Awards	Outstanding Featured Performer in an Off-Broadway Musical	Julia Knitel	Nominated
2024	Outer Critics Circle Awards	Outstanding Featured Performer in an Off-Broadway Musical	Thom Sesma	Nominated
2024	Outer Critics Circle Awards	Outstanding Book of a Musical	Itamar Moses	Nominated
2024	Outer Critics Circle Awards	Outstanding New Score	Erik Della Penna and David Yazbek	Nominated
2024	Outer Critics Circle Awards	Outstanding Orchestrations	Erik Della Penna, Dean Sharenow, and David Yazbek	Nominated
2024	Outer Critics Circle Awards	Outstanding Direction of a Musical	David Cromer	Nominated
2024	New York Drama Critics' Circle Awards	Best Musical	Itamar Moses, David Yazbek and Erik Della Penna	Won
2024	Off-Broadway Alliance Awards	Best New Musical		Won
2024	Clarence Derwent Awards		Andrew Durand	Won

=== Original Broadway production ===
Year	Award	Category	Nominee	Result
2025	Drama League Awards	Outstanding Production of a Musical		Nominated
2025	Drama League Awards	Distinguished Performance	Andrew Durand	Nominated
2025	Tony Awards	Best Musical		Nominated
2025	Tony Awards	Best Actor in a Musical	Andrew Durand	Nominated
2025	Tony Awards	Best Featured Actor in a Musical	Jeb Brown	Nominated
2025	Tony Awards	Best Featured Actress in a Musical	Julia Knitel	Nominated
2025	Tony Awards	Best Original Score	Erik Della Penna and David Yazbek	Nominated
2025	Tony Awards	Best Book of a Musical	Itamar Moses	Nominated
2025	Tony Awards	Best Direction of a Musical	David Cromer	Nominated
2025	Dorian Awards	Outstanding Broadway Musical		Nominated
