= Elmer McCurdy =

American outlaw (1880–1911)

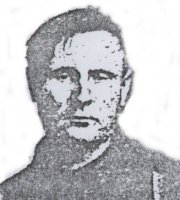
- Born: Elmer J. McCurdy; January 1, 1880; Washington, Maine, U.S.
- Died: October 7, 1911 (aged 31); Osage Hills, Oklahoma, U.S.
- Cause of death: Gunshot wound
- Body discovered: December 8, 1976; The Pike
- Resting place: Summit View Cemetery; 35°53′45″N 97°24′12″W
- Other names: Frank Curtis; Frank Davidson; Charles Smith
- Occupations: Plumber, miner, bank and train robber
- Military career
- Branch: US Army
- Service years: 1907–1910

Elmer J. McCurdy (January 1, 1880 – October 7, 1911) was an American outlaw who was killed in a shoot-out with police after robbing a train in Oklahoma in October 1911. Dubbed "The Bandit Who Wouldn't Give Up", his mummified body was first put on display at an Oklahoma funeral home and then became a fixture on the traveling carnival and sideshow circuit during the 1920s through the 1960s. After changing hands several times (it is not possible under U.S. law to own a human cadaver), McCurdy's remains eventually wound up at The Pike amusement zone in Long Beach, California, where they were discovered by crew members for the television series The Six Million Dollar Man and positively identified in December 1976.

In April 1977, McCurdy's body was buried at the Summit View Cemetery in Guthrie, Oklahoma.

== Early life ==
Elmer McCurdy was born in Washington, Maine, on January 1, 1880. He was the son of 17-year-old Sadie McCurdy, who was unmarried at the time of his birth. The identity of McCurdy's father is unknown; one possibility is Sadie's cousin, Charles Smith (McCurdy would later use the name "Charles Smith" as an alias). In order to save Sadie the social stigma of raising an illegitimate child, her brother George and his wife Helen adopted Elmer. After George died of tuberculosis in 1890, Sadie and Helen moved with Elmer to Bangor, Maine. Sadie eventually told McCurdy the truth about his parentage, which caused McCurdy to become "unruly and rebellious". As a teenager, he began drinking heavily, a habit that would continue throughout his life.

== Career ==
McCurdy eventually moved in with his grandfather and became an apprentice plumber. He was a competent worker and lived comfortably until an economic downturn in 1898. McCurdy lost his job and, in 1900, his mother died of a ruptured ulcer and his grandfather died of Bright's disease within the span of two months. Shortly after his grandfather's death, McCurdy left Maine and began drifting around the eastern United States, as a lead miner and plumber.

McCurdy was unable to hold a job for an extended period due to his alcoholism. He eventually made his way to Kansas, where he worked as a plumber in Cherryvale. McCurdy then moved to Iola, Kansas, where, in 1905, he was arrested for public intoxication. He then moved to Webb City, Missouri.

In 1907, McCurdy joined the United States Army. Assigned to Fort Leavenworth, he operated a machine gun and was trained to use nitroglycerin for demolition purposes (the extent of this training was likely minimal). He was honorably discharged from the Quartermaster Corps on November 7, 1910.

== Criminal activity ==
Following his discharge from the army, McCurdy travelled to St. Joseph, Missouri, where he reunited with a former army friend. On November 19, the two men were arrested after police found them carrying burglary tools, including chisels, hacksaws, funnels for nitroglycerin, gunpowder, and money sacks. During their arraignment, they claimed the equipment was intended for a foot-operated machine gun they were inventing. Two months later, in January 1911, a jury found McCurdy not guilty. Following his release from county jail, he turned to robbery.

Drawing on his Army demolition training, McCurdy began targeting banks and trains with nitroglycerin. In several robberies, however, he used either too much explosive or too little to achieve his objective. After relocating to Lenapah, Oklahoma, in March 1911, he joined three accomplices in robbing Iron Mountain–Missouri Pacific train No. 104, having learned that one of its cars contained a safe holding $4,000. Although the gang succeeded in stopping the train and locating the safe, McCurdy used so much nitroglycerin that the explosion destroyed both the safe and most of its contents. The robbers escaped with $100 to $500 in silver coins, many of which had melted and fused to fragments of the safe.

Six months later, on September 21, 1911, McCurdy and two accomplices attempted to rob the Citizens Bank in Chautauqua, Kansas. After spending two hours breaking through the bank wall, he blasted open the outer vault door with nitroglycerin but failed to breach the safe inside. When one of the gang's lookouts fled, the robbers abandoned the attempt and escaped with about $150 in coins that had been left outside the safe. Later that night, McCurdy travelled to the ranch of his friend Charlie Revard near Bartlesville, Oklahoma, where he remained in hiding and drank heavily.

Less than two weeks later, on October 4, 1911, McCurdy attempted his final robbery near Okesa, Oklahoma, intending to intercept a Missouri–Kansas–Texas Railroad train carrying approximately $400,000 in royalty payments to the Osage Nation. Instead, he and his accomplices mistakenly stopped a passenger train, escaping with just $46, two demijohns of whiskey, a revolver, a coat, and the conductor's watch. A contemporary newspaper described it as "one of the smallest in the history of train robbery" because of the meagre haul.

Following the failed robbery, McCurdy returned to Revard's ranch with the stolen whiskey. Already suffering from tuberculosis contracted while working in mines, as well as mild pneumonia and trichinosis, he spent the evening drinking with ranch hands before retiring to the hayloft the following morning. Unaware that a $2,000 reward had been offered for his capture, McCurdy slept while law enforcement officers tracked him to the ranch.

== Shootout and death ==
In the early morning hours of October 7, a posse of three deputy sheriffs, brothers Bob and Stringer Fenton and Dick Wallace, tracked McCurdy to the hay shed using bloodhounds. They surrounded the hay shed and waited for daylight. In an interview featured in the October 8, 1911 edition of the Daily Examiner, Sheriff Bob Fenton recalled:

It began just about 7 o'clock. We were standing around waiting for him to come out when the first shot was fired at me. It missed me and he then turned his attention to my brother, Stringer Fenton. He shot three times at Stringer and when my brother got under cover he turned his attention to Dick Wallace. He kept shooting at all of us for about an hour. We fired back every time we could. We do not know who killed him ... (on the trail) we found one of the jugs of whiskey which was taken from the train. It was about empty. He was pretty drunk when he rode up to the ranch last night.

McCurdy was killed by a single gunshot wound to the chest which he sustained while lying down.

== Display after death ==
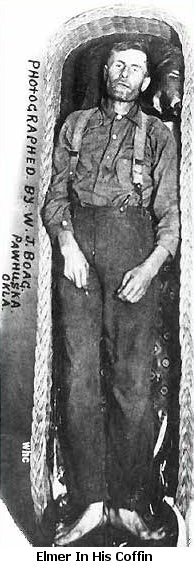
McCurdy's body on display

Following his death in October 1911, McCurdy's body was taken to undertaker Joseph L. Johnson in Pawhuska, Oklahoma, where it remained unclaimed. Johnson embalmed the body with an arsenic-based preservative commonly used at the time when no next of kin could be located. He shaved McCurdy's face, dressed him in a suit, and stored him in the back of his funeral home before placing him on public display. Refusing to bury or release McCurdy until his embalming expenses were paid, Johnson instead exhibited him in the funeral home, where visitors paid a nickel to see "The Bandit Who Wouldn't Give Up". Dressed in street clothes with a rifle in his hands, McCurdy became a popular attraction and drew numerous offers from carnival promoters, although Johnson refused to sell the body. He was also advertised as "The Oklahoma Outlaw" and "The Embalmed Bandit".

Five years later, in October 1916, two men falsely claiming to be McCurdy's brothers persuaded Johnson to release the body for what they said would be burial in San Francisco, California. Instead, McCurdy was shipped to Arkansas City, Kansas, where James and Charles Patterson exhibited him as "The Outlaw Who Would Never Be Captured Alive" with the Great Patterson Carnival Shows, a traveling carnival. After learning about the popular exhibit, the brothers had devised a scheme to obtain McCurdy by posing as his long-lost siblings. McCurdy remained with the Patterson carnival until 1922, when James Patterson sold the operation to showman Louis Sonney.

Over the next three decades, McCurdy appeared in a variety of travelling exhibitions across the United States. Sonney displayed him in the Museum of Crime alongside wax figures of well-known outlaws including Bill Doolin and Jesse James. In 1928, McCurdy accompanied the official sideshow of the Trans-American Footrace. Five years later, filmmaker Dwain Esper exhibited him in theatre lobbies to promote the exploitation film Narcotic!, falsely presenting him as a drug addict who had died after robbing a drug store and becoming trapped by police. By then, McCurdy's body had naturally mummified, with the skin hardening, shrinking, and becoming shrivelled. Esper claimed that this appearance demonstrated the physical effects of narcotics abuse.

After Sonney's death in 1949, McCurdy was placed in storage in a Los Angeles warehouse. In 1964, Sonney's son Dan lent him to filmmaker David F. Friedman for a brief appearance in the film She Freak (1967). Four years later, Dan Sonney sold McCurdy, together with several wax figures, for $10,000 to Spoony Singh, owner of the Hollywood Wax Museum. Singh loaned him to two Canadian showmen for an exhibition near Mount Rushmore, where a windstorm damaged the body. After the exhibition, McCurdy was returned to Singh, who considered him too gruesome and insufficiently lifelike to continue displaying. Singh subsequently sold him to Ed Liersch, co-owner of The Pike, an amusement zone in Long Beach, California. By 1976, McCurdy was hanging from the gallows in the Laff in the Dark funhouse, where visitors believed he was a wax mannequin.

== Rediscovery ==
On December 8, 1976, the production crew of the television series The Six Million Dollar Man was filming scenes for the "Carnival of Spies" episode at The Pike. During the shoot, a prop man moved what was thought to be a wax mannequin that was hanging from a gallows. When the mannequin's arm broke off, a human bone and muscle tissue were visible.

Police were called and the corpse was taken to the Los Angeles coroner's office. On December 9, Joseph Choi conducted an autopsy and determined that the body was that of a human male who had died of a gunshot wound to the chest. The body was completely petrified, covered in wax and layers of phosphorus paint. It weighed approximately 50 pounds (23 kg) and was 63 inches (160 cm) in height. Some hair was still visible on the sides and back of the head while the ears, big toes and fingers were missing. The examination also revealed incisions from his original autopsy and embalming. Tests conducted on the tissue showed the presence of arsenic, which was a component of embalming fluid until the late 1920s. Tests also revealed tuberculosis in the lung, as well as bunions and scars that McCurdy was documented to have had. While the bullet that caused the fatal wound was presumably removed during the original autopsy, the bullet jacket was found. It was determined to be a gas check, a device first used in 1905 until 1940. These clues helped investigators pinpoint the era in which the man had been killed.

Further clues to the man's identity were found when the mandible was removed for dental analysis. Inside the mouth was a 1924 penny and ticket stubs to Louis Sonney's Museum of Crime. Investigators contacted Dan Sonney who confirmed that the body was Elmer McCurdy. Forensic anthropologist Clyde Snow was then called in to help make a positive identification. Snow took radiographs of the skull and placed them over a photo of McCurdy taken at the time of his death in a process called superimposition. Snow was able to determine that skull was that of McCurdy.

== Burial ==
By December 11, the story of McCurdy's journey had been featured in newspapers and on television and radio. Several funeral homes called the coroner's office offering to bury McCurdy free of charge, but officials decided to wait to see if any living relatives would come forward to claim the body. Fred Olds, who represented the Indian Territory Posse of Oklahoma Westerns, eventually convinced Dr. Thomas Noguchi, then the Chief Medical Examiner-Coroner for the County of Los Angeles, to allow him to bury the body in Oklahoma. After further testing to ensure proper identification, Olds was allowed to take custody of the body.

On April 22, 1977, a funeral procession was conducted to transport McCurdy to the Boot Hill section of the Summit View Cemetery in Guthrie, Oklahoma. A graveside service attended by approximately 300 people was conducted after which McCurdy was buried next to Bill Doolin. To ensure that McCurdy's body would not be stolen, two feet (60 cm) of concrete was poured over the casket.

== In popular culture ==
- The 1989 computer game At the Carnival features a puzzle based on the discover of McCurdy's remains.
- The HBO Documentary Autopsy featured the case of McCurdy in a 1995 episode.
- Elmer McCurdy is featured in the episode "Death" of Drunk History, where he is played by Justin Long.
- McCurdy is the subject of the musical Dead Outlaw, which premiered off-Broadway in 2024 before transferring to Broadway in April 2025, he is played by Andrew Durand in both productions.

== See also ==
- Jeremy Bentham, whose mummified remains were put on display, in accordance with his will.
- Jonah Hex, a comic–book character whose post-demise exploits in The Last Jonah Hex Story echo McCurdy's posthumous fate.

== Bibliography ==
- Anderson, Dan (2007). One Hundred Oklahoma Outlaws, Gangsters, and Lawmen, 1839–1939. Pelican Publishing. ISBN 978-1-4556-0004-5.
- Farris, David Ayoub (1999). Oklahoma Outlaw Tales. Little Bruce. ISBN 0-9646922-1-X.
- Hall, Holly Samson (2021). The Most Wonderful Wonder: True and Tragic Tales from the Back Roads of American History. Messenger Moth Press. ISBN 978-1-7350-185-1-5.
- Hasten, Linda L. (2004). Archaeology (7 ed.). McGraw-Hill/Dushkin. ISBN 0-07-294960-0.
- Parascandola, John (2012). King of Poisons: A History of Arsenic. Potomac Books, Inc. ISBN 978-1-59797-703-6.
- Quigley, Christine (1998). Modern Mummies: The Preservation of the Human Body in the Twentieth Century. McFarland. ISBN 0-7864-2851-1.
- Schaefer, Eric (1999). "Bold! Daring! Shocking! True!": A History of Exploitation Films, 1919–1959. Duke University Press. ISBN 0-8223-2374-5.
- Smith, Robert Barr (2013). Outlaw Tales of Oklahoma: True Stories of the Sooner State's Most Infamous Crooks, Culprits, and Cutthroats. Rowman & Littlefield. ISBN 978-1-4930-0258-0.
- Snow, Clyde C.; Reyman, Theodore Allen (1977). The Life and Afterlife of Elmer J. McCurdy: A Melodrama in Two Acts. Paleopathology Association.
- Svenvold, Mark (2003). Elmer McCurdy: The Life and Afterlife of an American Outlaw. Basic Books. ISBN 0-465-08349-8.
- Ubelaker, Douglas; Scammell, Henry (2000). Bones: A Forensic Detective's Casebook. M. Evans. ISBN 1-4616-6293-1.
