= Anne Soon Choi =

American historian

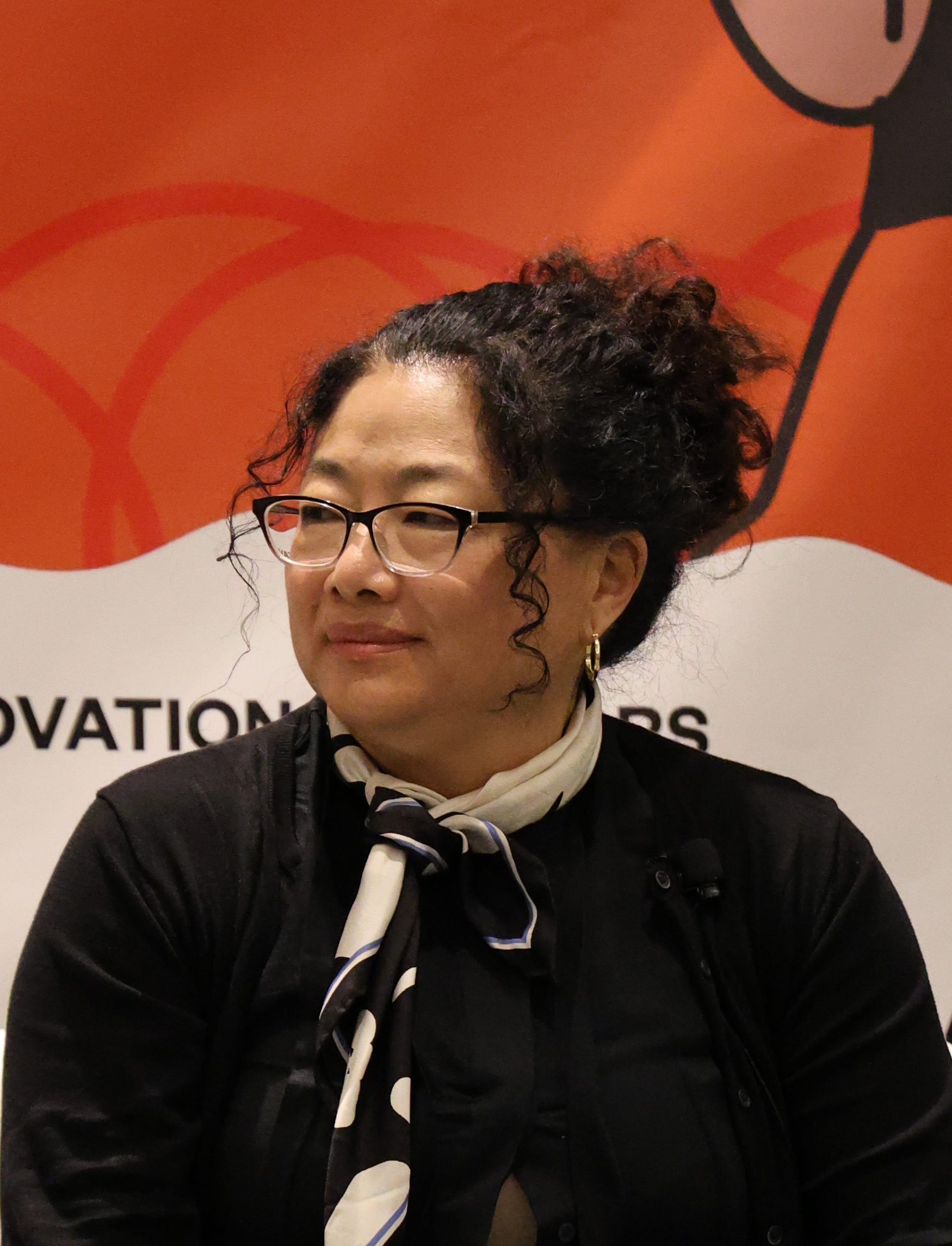
- Anne Soon Choi in 2026
- Occupation: History Professor
- Writing career
- Language: English
- Genre: History
- Notable works: L.A. Coroner: Thomas Noguchi and Death in Hollywood
- Website: annesoonchoi.com

Anne Soon Choi is an American historian and author of the 2025 book, L.A. Coroner: Thomas Noguchi and Death in Hollywood. She is an immigration historian who focuses on Asian American studies.

Choi is also a professor at California State University, Northridge.

== Education ==
Choi recover her PhD in history from University of Southern California. She received her undergraduate degrees in American history and East Asian studies from Indiana University, Bloomington, and a Master of Arts in history from the University of Massachusetts, Amherst. She also holds a Master of Social Work and Master of Public Health from the University of California, Los Angeles.

== Career ==
In the 1990s, Choi found Thomas Noguchi's memoir in the $1 bin at the Strand Bookstore in New York City. She bought it because it was unusual to see popular books by Asian American writers at that time, except for Amy Tan.

Decades later, the book was still in her house. During COVID-19 pandemic she had enough time to write and publish "The Japanese American Citizens League, Los Angeles Politics, and the Thomas Noguchi Case." The article went on to win the Francis M. Wheat Award for historical research in Southern California and became the foundation for a biography.
