= Ronald Kornblum =

American coroner

Chief Medical Examiner-Coroner for the County of Los Angeles
- In office April 27, 1982 – July 1, 1990
- Preceded by: Thomas Noguchi
- Succeeded by: J. Lawrence Cogan (Acting)

Chief Medical Examiner-Coroner of Ventura County
- In office January 1, 1974 – August 31, 1980
- Preceded by: First
- Succeeded by: F. Warren Lovell

Personal details
- Born: December 5, 1933 Chicago, Illinois, U.S.
- Died: September 23, 2008 (aged 74) La Cañada Flintridge, California, U.S.
- Education: University of California Los Angeles; University of California San Francisco
- Occupation: Coroner

Ronald N. Kornblum (December 5, 1933 – September 23, 2008) was an American coroner who served as Los Angeles County Coroner from 1982 to 1990.

== Early life ==
Kornblum was born December 5, 1933, in Chicago. He completed his undergraduate studies at the University of California, Los Angeles and earned his medical degree at the University of California, San Francisco. From 1960 to 1961, Kornblum was a Navy medical officer in Saigon.

== Early career ==
After Kornblum's naval service, he pursued his medical residency at Santa Clara County Hospital. Kornblum discovered that he enjoyed diagnosing illnesses more than treating them and decided to specialize in pathology. In 1966 he took a job with the Maryland Medical Examiner's office, where he rose to the position of chief deputy. There he presided over the autopsy of Yosef Alon.

== Ventura County ==
In November 1973, Kornblum was named Ventura County's first full-time Chief Medical Examiner-Coroner after the county adopted a new system. He took office on January 1, 1974.

== Los Angeles County ==
In 1980, Kornblum left Ventura County to become the top assistant to Los Angeles County Coroner Thomas Noguchi. In 1982 Noguchi was demoted to physician specialist for speaking too freely to the media, moonlighting, and alleged mismanagement. Kornblum was appointed acting coroner. In 1987 he was appointed to the job outright after the Supreme Court of California declined to hear Noguchi's legal challenge of his demotion.

Kornblum was praised for improving the office's efficiency and professionalism. He was also recognized for his knowledge of Sudden infant death syndrome, chokehold deaths, and fatalities involving Tasers. However Kornblum's office was also criticized for moving too slow on autopsies, leaving bodies at crime scenes for hours, and for bouncing corpses on freeways due to bad door locks on old coroner vehicles.

Notable autopsies Kornblum performed include John Belushi, Natalie Wood, Truman Capote, William Holden, Karen Carpenter, Ron Settles, and Warren Oates. Outside of his capacity as coroner he testified in the Preppie Murder trial as an expert on chokehold deaths.

In 1990, Kornblum resigned as Los Angeles County Coroner after an independent audit found that staff shortages and a high homicide rate were leading to unsanitary conditions, including dead insect larvae in the morgue and a body that had decomposed because it had been misplaced, and poor oversight of employees that had allowed for a double-billing scam to take place. Kornblum stated that he agreed with most of the 154 changes called for in the audit and had begun to implement some, but certain changes were impossible due to the "limited size of the department's budget and the overwhelming workload".

== Death ==
Kornblum died on September 23, 2008, at his home in La Cañada Flintridge, California.
