= Lakshmanan Sathyavagiswaran =

Indian-born American coroner (1949–2026)

Chief Medical Examiner-Coroner for the County of Los Angeles
- In office 18 February 1992 – 11 August 2013
- Preceded by: J. Lawrence Cogan (Acting)
- Succeeded by: Mark A. Fajardo

Personal details
- Born: 17 March 1949 Madras, Madras Province, India
- Died: 8 April 2026 (aged 77)
- Education: Loyola College, Chennai; Stanley Medical College
- Occupation: Medical Examiner

Lakshmanan Sathyavagiswaran (Tamil: லட்சுமணன் சத்யவாகீஸ்வரன்; 17 March 1949 – 8 April 2026) was an Indian-born American coroner who was the Chief Medical Examiner-Coroner for the County of Los Angeles. In 2016, he again took over this position on an interim basis until 18 January 2017.

== Education and early career ==
Sathyavagiswaran graduated from Loyola College, Chennai, in 1965 and Stanley Medical College in 1971. In 1972, he immigrated to the United States, where he interned at the Jewish Hospital of Brooklyn. From 1972 to 1973, he trained in anatomical and clinical pathology at St. Luke's Hospital of Columbia University. From 1973 to 1977, he was the senior resident in medicine at Brooklyn Cumberland Hospital.

== Los Angeles County Coroner ==
In 1977, Sathyavagiswaran joined the Los Angeles County Coroner's Office. He worked his way up to the position of chief of forensic medicine. In 1990, he was passed over in favor of J. Lawrence Cogan for the position of Chief Medical Examiner-Coroner.

Sathyavagiswaran was appointed Chief Medical Examiner-Coroner in 1992. The Los Angeles County Board of Supervisors' first selection, Joshua Perper of Allegheny County, Pennsylvania, declined the job due to Los Angeles' high housing costs. The Board's second choice, Yong-Myun Rho of Queens, New York, thrice failed the state medical exam. Sathyavagiswaran was then selected over Cogan after the Board of Supervisors received a letter signed by several deputy medical examiners requesting the County to consider the in-house candidates rather than outsiders.

He was the medical examiner during the O. J. Simpson murder case and testified during the criminal and civil trials. Sathyavagiswaran also testified in the trials of Dean Carter and Phil Spector, as well as in the wrongful death suit brought against the Los Angeles Police Department by the family of Emil Mătăsăreanu.

Sathyavagiswaran supervised the autopsy on the body of Michael Jackson on 26 June 2009. On 21 August 2012, Sathyavagiswaran amended Natalie Wood's death certificate and changed the cause of death from accidental drowning to "drowning and other undetermined factors".

Following the unexpected resignation of Sathyavagiswaran's successor Mark Fajardo in March 2016, the Los Angeles County Board of Supervisors voted unanimously to appoint Sathyavagiswaran as interim coroner even though he had retired three years earlier.

== Death ==
Sathyavagiswaran died on 8 April 2026, at the age of 77.
