= Julia Knitel =

American actress and singer

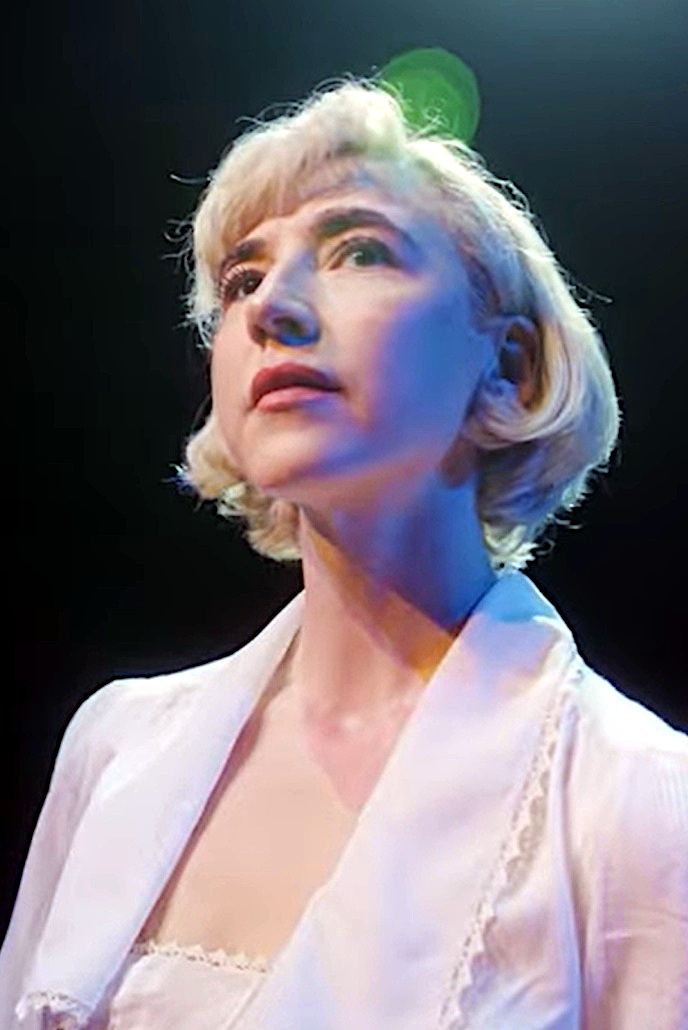
- Knitel in Dead Outlaw 2025
- Born: January 30, 1993 (age 33); Fair Lawn, New Jersey, U.S.
- Education: Marymount Manhattan College (no degree)
- Occupations: Actress; singer
- Years active: 2009–present
- Spouse: PJ Adzima (2019-2025)

Julia Nicole Knitel (born January 30, 1993) is an American actress and singer known for her work in theater. In 2025, she was nominated for her first Tony Award for Best Featured Actress in a Musical for her role as Maggie/Helen in Dead Outlaw.

== Early life and career ==
Knitel was born and raised in Fair Lawn, New Jersey, and was introduced to the arts at a young age by her parents who were actors. Knitel was a 2009 Jimmy Awards nominee for her performance as Millie in Thoroughly Modern Millie at Fair Lawn High School and performed at the Paper Mill Playhouse as a child.

== Broadway and performing career ==
In 2009, Knitel made her Broadway debut at age sixteen in the ensemble of the revival of Bye Bye Birdie at the Henry Miller Theatre.

She played the lead role of Carole King in the biographical musical Beautiful: The Carole King Musical on Broadway and on tour. She also played the role of Janice in Come from Away on tour. In 2018, she played Louise opposite Beth Leavel as Mama Rose in a production of Gypsy at The Muny in St. Louis. Also in 2018 she starred in the Off-Broadway musical Letter to Harvey Milk as Barbara Katsef, for which she was nominated for a Lucille Lortel Award for Outstanding Lead Actress in a Musical.

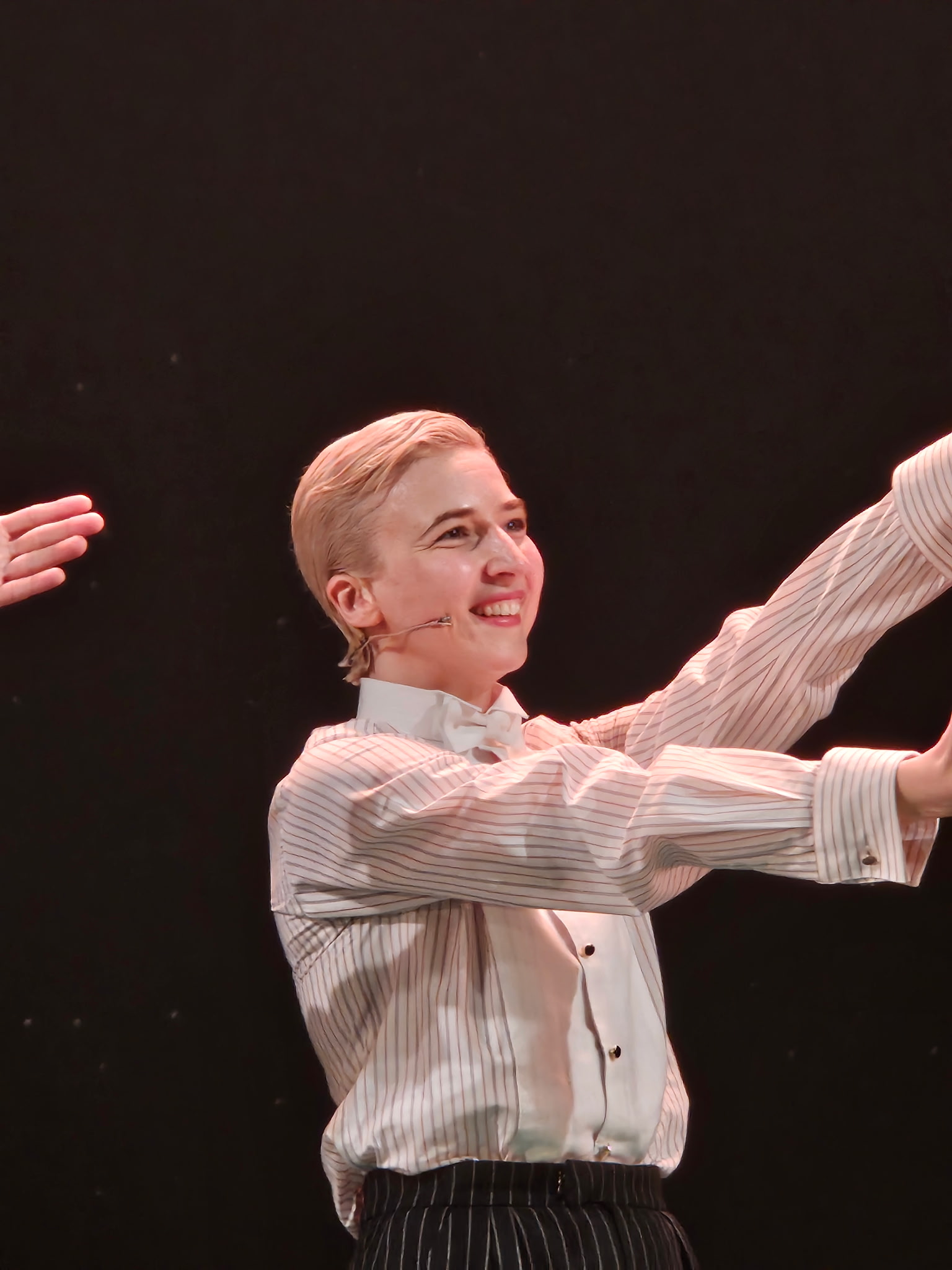
Knitel at the curtain call for Operation Mincemeat in 2026

In 2024, she originated the dual roles of Millicent / Maggie / Helen in the Off-Broadway musical Dead Outlaw, and reprised the role in the 2025 Broadway production. She was nominated for an Outer Critics Circle Award and a Tony Award for her performance.

In February 2026, it was announced that she would be taking over the role of Ewen Montagu & Others in the Broadway production of Operation Mincemeat from original cast member and writer Natasha Hodgson.

== Personal life ==
Knitel married actor P.J. Adzima and separated in 2025.

== Stage ==
Year	Title	Role	Venue	Ref.
2009	Bye Bye Birdie	Teenager, Fan Club Girl	Henry Miller's Theatre, Broadway	
2013	Volley Girls	Ingrid	The New York Music Theatre Festival	
2014	Beautiful: The Carole King Musical	Ensemble	Stephen Sondheim Theatre, Broadway	
2014	Brighton Beach Memoirs	Nora Morton	Portland Stage, Regional	
2015	Beautiful: The Carole King Musical	Carole King	U.S. National Tour	
2018	Letter to Harvey Milk	Barbara	Acorn Theatre, Off-Broadway	
2018	Gypsy	Louise	The Muny, Regional	
2018	The Constant Wife	Martha Culver	Denver Center for the Performing Arts, Regional	
2019	The Producers	Ulla	Casa Mañana, Regional	
2019	Come From Away	Janice & Others	U.S. National Tour	
2022	The Panic of '29	Performer	59E59 Theatres, Off-Broadway	
2024	Beautiful: The Carole King Musical	Carole King	Cape Playhouse, Regional	
2024	Dead Outlaw	Helen/Maggie	Minetta Lane Theatre, Off-Broadway	
2025	Dead Outlaw	Helen/Maggie	Longacre Theatre, Broadway	
2025	Beautiful: The Carole King Musical	Carole King	Asolo Repertory Theatre, Regional	
2025	A Christmas Carol	Belle	PAC NYC	
2026	Operation Mincemeat	Ewen Montagu & Others	John Golden Theatre, Broadway	

== Awards and nominations ==
Award	Year	Category	Work	Result	Ref.
Lucille Lortel Awards	2018	Outstanding Lead Actress in a Musical	Letter to Harvey Milk	Nominated	
Outer Critics Circle Awards	2024	Outstanding Featured Performer in an Off-Broadway Musical	Dead Outlaw	Nominated	
Tony Awards	2025	Best Featured Actress in a Musical	Dead Outlaw	Nominated	
