= Los Angeles County Department of Medical Examiner =

Medical Examiner's Office, LA County, California, United States of America

Department overview
- Formed: June 24, 1850
- Preceding department: Los Angeles County Coroner
- Jurisdiction: Los Angeles County, California
- Headquarters: Boyle Heights, Los Angeles, California
- Department executive: Odey C. Ukpo M.D., Chief Medical Examiner
- Website: me.lacounty.gov

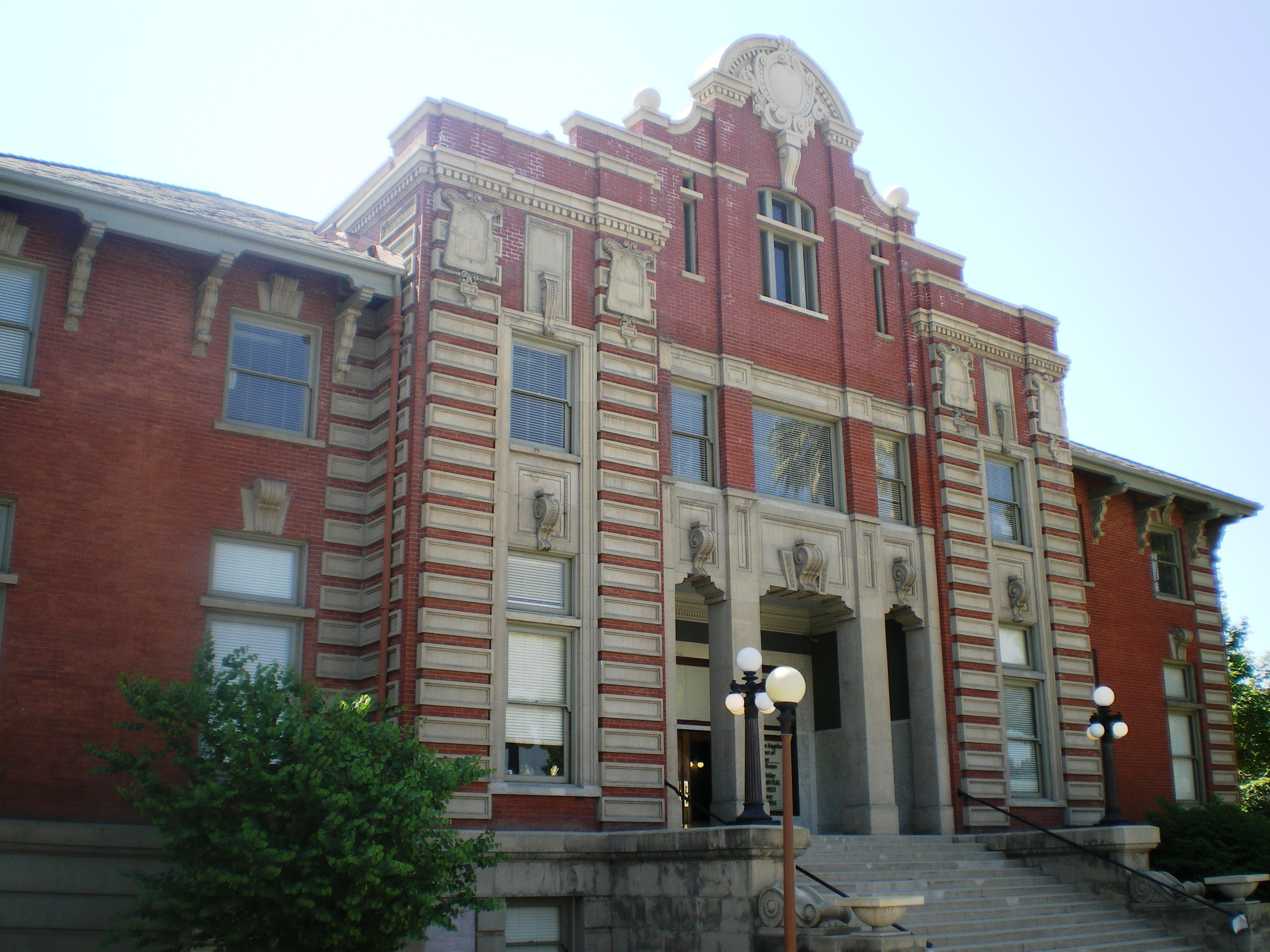
Los Angeles County Medical Examiner Building in 2008

The Los Angeles County Department of Medical Examiner is the medical examiner's office of the government of the County of Los Angeles, California. It is located in the Boyle Heights neighborhood in Los Angeles.

== History ==
Established in its current form on December 17, 1920, by an ordinance approved by the Los Angeles County Board of Supervisors, the office has a history dating back to the appointment of the first county coroner in 1850. The department was previously known as both the Los Angeles County Department of Medical Examiner-Coroner and the Los Angeles County Department of Coroner.

As of 2023, it has a staff of 260, and covers 13,000 cases per year.

== List of chief medical examiners ==
The Los Angeles County Department of Medical Examiner recognized the following individuals as its leaders in the agency's history.

No.	Name	From	To
Los Angeles County Coroner (1850–1957)
1	Alpheus P. Hodges, M.D.	1850	1851
2	Rafael (Ralph) C. Guirado	1852	
3	Joseph Stillman Mallard	1853	
4	Thomas A. Mayes	1854	1855
5	Q. A. Sneed	1856	
6	James Brown Winston, M.D.	1857	
7	A. Cook	1858	
8	Henry A. Miles	1859	
9	H. P. Swain	1860	1861
10	J. S. Griffin, M.D.	1862	1865
11	J. L. Smith	1866	1867
12	Vincent Gelcich, M.D.	1868	1869
13	Joseph Kurtz, M.D.	1870	1873
14	N. P. Richardson	1874	1875
15	Joseph Kurtz, M.D.	1876	1877
16	J. Hannon	1878	1879
17	Louis Hubert Nadeau, M.D.	1879	1884
18	Andrew McFarland, M.D.	1885	1886
19	J. M. Meredith	1887	1890
20	William Amasa Weldon, M.D.	1891	1893
21	Horace Getchell Cates, M.D.	1893	1895
22	George Walter Campbell, M.D.	1895	1899
23	L. T. Holland, M.D.	1899	1902
24	John Henry Trout, M.D.	1902	1907
25	Roy Stanley Lanterman, M.D.	1907	1908
26	Calvin Hartwell	1908	1920
27	F. T. Williams	1920	1921
28	Frank Albert Nance	1921	1945
29	Ben Harlan Brown	1945	1953
30	E. A. Winstanley	1953	1957
Chief Medical Examiner-Coroner
1	Theodore Joslyn Curphey, M.D.	1957	1966
2	Thomas T. Noguchi, M.D.	1966	1983
3	Ronald Kornblum, M.D.	1983	1990
acting	J. Lawrence Cogan, M.D.	1990	1992
4	Lakshmanan Sathyavagiswaran, M.D.	1992	2013
5	Mark A. Fajardo, M.D.	2013	2016
acting	Christopher Rogers, M.D.	2017	
6	Jonathan R. Lucas, M.D.	2017	2022
interim	Odey C. Ukpo, M.D., M.S.	2022	2023
7	Odey C. Ukpo, M.D., M.S.	2023	present

=== Former administrative roles ===
Director (office abolished)
1	Ilona Lewis	1990	1993
2	Anthony T. Hernandez	1993	2012
interim	Lakshmanan Sathyavagiswaran, M.D.	2012	2013

== Recent chief medical examiners ==
=== Mark A. Fajardo ===
On July 9, 2010, the Board of Supervisors approved the appointment of Mark A. Fajardo, the Chief Forensic Pathologist at Riverside County, as the Medical Examiner-Coroner, at an annual salary of $275,000. He formally replaced Lakshmanan Sathyavagiswaran, who served 2 years as the Coroner, in August 2013.

Mark Fajardo resigned in March 2016. A news report indicated that "he left because it became common to have up to 50 bodies waiting to be processed and the backlog of bodies was 'nuts'. ... and toxicology tests were taking six months to complete" due to inadequate staffing. Fajardo's predecessor, Lakshmanan Sathyavagiswaran, was re-appointed on an interim basis on April 11, 2016.

=== Jonathan R. Lucas ===
Jonathan R. Lucas was appointed as the Chief Medical Examiner-Coroner on July 10, 2017. Lucas announced his intent to leave DMEC in September 2022.

=== Odey C. Ukpo ===
On November 4, 2022, Odey C. Ukpo, Medical Director of the Department, was sworn in as Interim Chief Medical Examiner-Coroner. Upko received his medical degree from Loyola University Chicago. Ukpo is the first African American to serve as Chief Medical Examiner-Coroner since the office was established in 1850. Ukpo joined the Department in 2014 and served as a Senior Deputy Medical Examiner before being named Medical Director in June 2022. On March 7, 2023, the Los Angeles County Board of Supervisors appointed Odey C. Ukpo as Chief Medical Examiner-Coroner. Ukpo's office handled the death of television star Matthew Perry.

Ukpo has urged greater transparency in cases involving celebrities, citing cases where the records of the medical examiner's office has been sealed by the Los Angeles Police Department. He cited two cases where this has been done such as the deaths of Rob Reiner and his wife, and the death of Celeste Rivas Hernandez.
