= Theodore Curphey =

American coroner (1897–1986)

Los Angeles County Coroner
- In office March 19, 1957 – October 25, 1967
- Preceded by: Edward A. Winstanley
- Succeeded by: Thomas Noguchi

Chief Medical Examiner of Nassau County (New York State)
- In office December 15, 1937 – March 19, 1957
- Preceded by: Carl A. Hettesheimer
- Succeeded by: Leslie Lukash

Personal details
- Born: October 25, 1897 Kingston, Jamaica
- Died: November 27, 1986 (aged 89) Pasadena, California, U.S.
- Spouse: Aies Norrild (m. 1928; died 1973)
- Occupation: Pathologist, Coroner

Theodore Joscelyn Curphey (October 25, 1897 – November 27, 1986) was an American coroner who was the chief coroner for Los Angeles and Nassau (New York) Counties.

Curphey was elected Nassau County medical examiner on December 15, 1937, by the Nassau County Board of Supervisors. Prior to becoming county medical examiner, Curphey had worked as a pathologist at St. John's Hospital in Brooklyn and Meadowbrook Hospital in East Meadow, New York. As Nassau County's Chief Medical Examiner he oversaw the autopsies of Robert L. Bacon, Janet Fay, Owen Davis, Jr., and William Woodward, Jr. He also worked with the FBI to identify the fatalities of Northeast Airlines Flight 823. While working as Nassau County Medical Examiner, Curphey also served as the Chairman of the New York State Medical Society's Public Health and Education Committee, President of the Nassau County Medical Society, and Chairman of the Nassau County Committee of the American Cancer Society.

On March 19, 1957, Curphey was announced as the first Coroner of Los Angeles County. In his first year as coroner, he was involved in a dispute with local morticians over delay in issuing death certificates. In November 1958, Curphey's autopsy procedures were investigated by a grand jury, which accused him of misconduct. The charges against Curphey were later brought before the Los Angeles County Civil Service Commission, which promised him that no further complaints would be filed against him.

Curphey was the chief coroner during the investigation into the death of Marilyn Monroe. On August 7, 1962, soon after her August 4 death, Curphey announced that a massive overdose of barbiturates was the cause of death. He later said she had lethal doses of both Nembutal and chloral hydrate and she could have been killed by either.

Curphey also administered the autopsies of Jack Westrope, George Reeves, Davey Moore, Red Sanders, and Dorothy Dandridge.

Curphey retired on October 25, 1967, from the Los Angeles County Coroner’s office. After his retirement he served as consultant in forensic medicine and on the Suicide Prevention Bureau, which he founded. On November 27, 1986, Curphey died at age 89.

Curphey was married to the former Aies Norrild, of Copenhagen, from 1928 until her death in 1973. They had a son and a daughter.
