= Bert Casey =

Oklahoma Territory outlaw (died 1903)

William E. "Bert" Casey (died 1903) was a violent outlaw who operated out of the Oklahoma Territory.

He and his gang were responsible for several savage murders, including those of the eleven-year-old son of Dr. Zeno Beenblossum, Deputy U.S. Marshal Luther "Lute" Houston, and Caddo County Sheriff Frank Smith and his deputy, George Beck. Perhaps the most senseless killing attributed to Casey was murder of a farmer, shot at a distance of some 400 years (370m) reportedly to judge the range and accuracy of Casey's new Winchester rifle.

Fred Hudson, Ed Lockett, Joe Mobley, George Moran, Bob Sims, and Pete Williams have all been listed as members of Casey's gang. James and Ben Hughes (a father and son) also participated with the gang; although opinions differed as to whether they were members of the gang or employed them. Casey used the Hughes ranch as his hideout.

Casey was finally stopped by two of his former gang members (Fred Hudson and Ed Lockett), who were given Deputy U.S. Marshall commissions and promised a pardon if they captured or killed Casey. Hudson shot Casey dead as the outlaw ate breakfast near Cleo, Oklahoma. His body remained unclaimed and he was buried in the Boot Hill section of Summit View Cemetery in the territorial capitol of Guthrie.

Sherriff James S. Thompson of Caddo Country helped end Casey's career and was reportedly "obsessed" with the outlaw, who flouted his authority and even taunted him with a note pinned at the scene of a theft. Thompson's son was the writer Jim Thompson who wrote a true crime book, "Casey the Killer" (1937) and a 1950s magazine article about Casey.

== Sources ==
- Butler, Ken. Oklahoma Renegades: Their Deeds and Misdeeds. Pelican Publishing, 1997. ISBN 1-56554-231-2
