= Summit View Cemetery =

Cemetery in Guthrie, Oklahoma

- Interactive map of Summit View Cemetery

Details
- Established: June 1890
- Location: Guthrie, Oklahoma
- Country: United States
- Coordinates: 35°53′45″N 97°24′12″W
- Type: Public
- Owned by: City of Guthrie
- Size: 70 acres (28 ha)
- No. of graves: 13,500
- No. of interments: 18,282
- Website: Summit View Cemetery
- Find a Grave: Summit View Cemetery

Summit View Cemetery (established 1890) is a historic cemetery located in Guthrie, Oklahoma.

Operated by the city of Guthrie (the territorial capitol) since 1915, the cemetery is the final resting place for many prominent Oklahoma pioneers, including at least two territorial governors (Cassius McDonald Barnes and Robert Martin) and Frank Dale, the Chief Justice of the Territorial Supreme Court.

The cemetery has several sections, including a Boot Hill section in which several famous outlaws are buried—Bill Doolin, Charlie Pierce, Richard "Little Dick" West, Bert Casey, and Elmer McCurdy among them.
