= Andy Payne =

American law clerk and ultradistance runner (1907–1977)

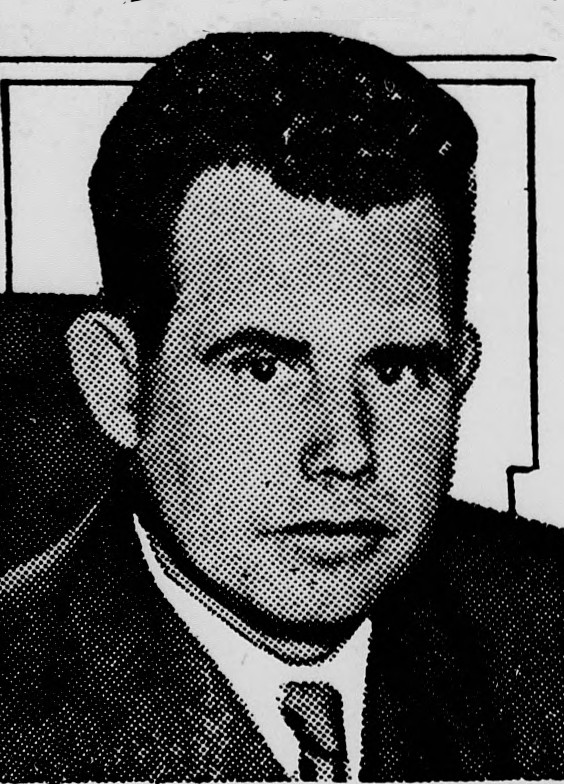
- Payne, c. 1935
- Born: November 17, 1907; Foyil, Oklahoma, U.S.
- Died: December 3, 1977 (aged 70); Oklahoma City, Oklahoma, U.S.
- Education: University of Arkansas, Oklahoma City University School of Law
- Occupation: Law clerk
- Years active: 1935–1972
- Known for: Trans-American Footrace winner (1928)
- Spouse: Vivian Payne (née Shaddox)
- Children: 2

Andrew Hartley Payne (November 17, 1907 – December 3, 1977) was an American member of the Cherokee Nation who served as a law clerk to the Oklahoma Supreme Court for nearly four decades. He is perhaps best remembered as the winner of the first Trans-American Footrace, an ultramarathon run in 1928.

== Biography ==
Payne, a member of the Cherokee Nation, was born in Foyil, Oklahoma, and graduated from high school there in 1927. His father, Doc, was a friend of Will Rogers and had worked on the ranch of the latter's family during his youth.

In 1928, Payne entered the inaugural Trans-American Footrace, also known as the Bunion Derby, a 3,423.5 mi (5,509.6 km) route from Los Angeles to New York City, much of it along U.S. Route 66, which the race was organized to promote. Payne's hometown in Oklahoma was one of the check point towns along the route. He completed the race in 573 hours, 4 minutes, 34 seconds, averaging 6 miles per hour (9.7 km/h) over the 84-day staged run.

The museum of history of Claremore, Oklahoma, near his hometown, notes:

The grand prize for winning first place was $25,000. (Note: ($468,750 in 2025)) When Andy returned to Oklahoma, he paid off the mortgage on his family’s farm and built his parents a new home. He bought some land of his own and a Ford sedan. Looking for an occupation that would allow him to use his fame as a runner, Payne decided on theater. He learned to rope and billed himself as a “Dancing Cowboy from Oklahoma.” That didn’t work out for the audiences in California. Andy found work as a reporter in Arkansas for the Fayetteville Leader. In addition, he also did some sales work and did work in the oil field. Andy moved back to Oklahoma and became clerk of the Oklahoma State Supreme Court. Being re-elected five-times, he served from January 1935 through December 1972.

Payne was educated at the University of Arkansas and the Oklahoma City University School of Law. He served two years in the U.S. Army during World War II. Payne died in December 1977 in Oklahoma City, Oklahoma, at the age of 70.

== See also ==
- Dead Outlaw, a musical that includes Payne's story
