= Jeb Brown =

American actor

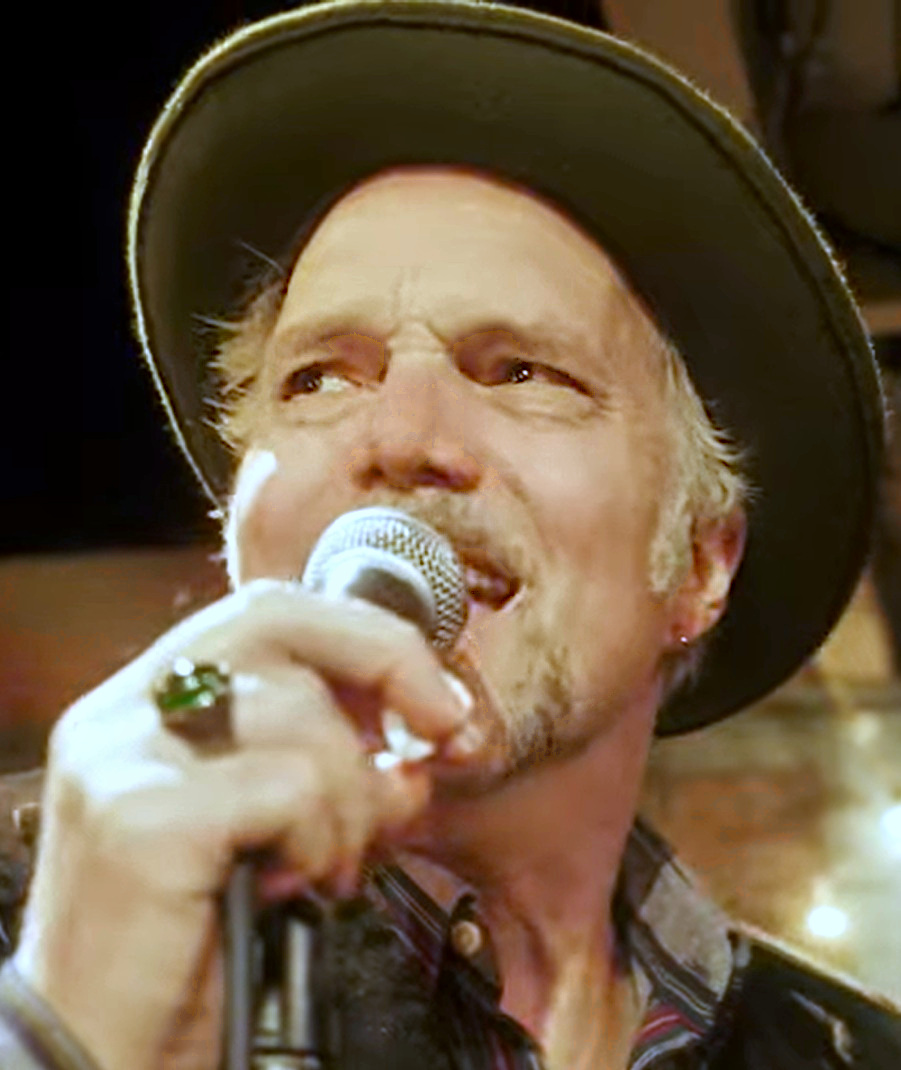
- Brown in Dead Outlaw 2025
- Born: August 11, 1964 (age 61); Greenwich, Connecticut, U.S.
- Education: Yale University
- Occupation: Actor
- Years active: 1974–present

Jeb Brown (born August 11, 1964) is an American actor known for his work in theatre. Brown has appeared in productions on- and off-Broadway including Grease, Spider-Man: Turn Off the Dark, and Beautiful: The Carole King Musical, in which he originated the role of Don Kirshner. For his performance in Dead Outlaw, Brown was nominated for the Tony Award for Best Featured Actor in a Musical.

== Life and career ==
A native of Greenwich, Connecticut, Brown made his Broadway debut at the age of ten, in Cat on a Hot Tin Roof. Before pursuing a full-time acting career, he earned a degree in theater studies from Yale, where he was a member of the a cappella group The Whiffenpoofs.

Since Cat on a Hot Tin Roof, Brown has performed in nine Broadway productions. In 2014, he originated the role of music publisher Don Kirshner in Beautiful: The Carole King Musical. He has also appeared in numerous off-Broadway musicals and television shows, including Hulu's The Path (2016–2018), in which he played recurring character Wesley Cox.

In 2025, Brown received a Tony nomination for his role in Dead Outlaw.

== Acting credits ==
=== Theatre ===
Year	Title	Role	Notes	Ref.
1974	Cat on a Hot Tin Roof	Child	Broadway	
1981	Bring Back Birdie	Gary	Broadway	
1999	Crazy for You	Lank Hawkins	Regional	
2000	Aida	Zoser standby; Pharaoh standby	Broadway	
2000	Game Show	Steve Fox	Off-Broadway	
2001	Carousel	Jigger Craigin	Regional	
2002	I'm Not Rappaport	The Cowboy	Broadway	
2005	Ring of Fire	Performer	Regional	
2006	Ring of Fire	Performer	Broadway	
2006	High Fidelity	Ian/Middle-Aged Guy	Broadway	
2007	Grease	Vince Fontaine	Broadway	
2008	Romantic Poetry	Red	Off-Broadway	
2011	Spider-Man: Turn Off the Dark	Mary Jane's Father/Ensemble; Norman Osborn/The Green Goblin understudy	Broadway	
2014	Beautiful: The Carole King Musical	Don Kirshner	Broadway	
2015	American Psycho	Detective Kimball	Off-Broadway Lab	
2015	The Undeniable Sound of Right Now	Hank	Off-Broadway	
2016	Terms of Endearment	Garrett	Off-Broadway	
2019	Scotland, PA	Duncan	Off-Broadway	
2020	Whisper House	The Sheriff	Off-Broadway	
2024	Dead Outlaw	Bandleader / Walter Jarrett	Off-Broadway	
2025	Dead Outlaw	Bandleader / Walter Jarrett	Broadway	
2025	Beau the Musical	Beau	Off-Broadway	

=== Film ===
Year	Title	Role
1994	I'll Do Anything	Male D Person
1994	Renaissance Man	Young Executive #1
1996	Black & White: A Love Story	Jamie
2006	The Namesake	Oliver
2010	Salt	Bunker Technician
2014	My America	The Announcer

=== Television ===
Year	Title	Role	Notes
1989	Hunter	Danny Martin	Episode: "Yesterday's Child"
1989	Nightmare Classics		Episode: "The Eye of the Panther"
1990	Gabriel's Fire	Shoe salesperson	Episode: "Money Walks"
1994	Dave's World		Episode: "Lobster Envy"
1996	Star Trek: Deep Space Nine	Ensign	Episode: "Nor The Battle To The Strong"
1999	Great Performances	Lank Hawkins	Episode: "Crazy for You"
2005	Law & Order: Criminal Intent	Altschuler	Episode: "My Good Name"
2007–2008	One Life to Live	Dr. Edward Bonner	4 episodes
2010	Law & Order: Special Victims Unit	Jake Bradshaw	Episode: "Beef"
2013	Golden Boy	Hank Taylor	Episode: "Sacrifice"
2014, 2016	Law & Order: Special Victims Unit	Gerbic	2 episodes
2016–2018	The Path	Wesley Cox	9 episodes
2018	The Good Fight	Chester	Episode: "Day 422"
2018	Instinct	Daniel	Episode: "Secrets and Lies"
2018	Elementary	Levi Salinger	Episode: "Sand Trap"
2019	Prodigal Son	County Sheriff	Episode: "Pilot"
2020	Little America	Jerry	Episode: "The Silence"

=== Audio ===
Year	Title	Role	Notes
2021	City of Ghosts	Senator DeStefano	2 episodes
