= Letter to Harvey Milk =

Musical based on Lesléa Newman's short story

Letter to Harvey Milk is a musical composed by Laura l. Kramer, lyrics by Ellen M. Schwartz, book by Jerry James; it is based on Lesléa Newman's short story of the same name. It won the Richard Rodgers Award in 2012.

== Production ==
Its New York premiere at the New York Musical Theatre Festival was directed by David Schechter and starred Leslie Kritzer, Jeff Keller, Cheryl Stern, Brandon Uranowitz and Sara Corey.

In 2018 it ran Off-Broadway at the Acorn Theater from March 6 until June 30. The show's direction was by Evan Pappas, music direction was by Jeffrey Lodin, with orchestrations by Ned Ginsburg. Set design was by David Arsenault, costumes by Debbi Hobson, lighting design by Christopher Akerlind, and sound design by David Margolin Lawso.

In 2022 the show had a run at the Waterloo East Theatre in the Off-West End from 9 June until 3 July.

== Synopsis ==
Setting: San Francisco, 1986

Harry – a retired Kosher butcher and widower – wakes up from a nightmare. His deceased wife, Frannie, is “woken up” by the noise and attempts to comfort him (Too Old For This). Harry explains that his simple life has been disrupted by a writing class at the local senior center in which his teacher, Barbara, is pushing him to “remember too much” (Thanks To Her). Frannie asks why he doesn't “give her back the notebook” and try a different class, and Harry doesn't know. She asserts that the teacher is helping him, and asks for him to tell her about the painful memories and nightmares his writing is bringing up.

The next scene takes place in Harry's writing class, where his young teacher Barbara shares her excitement at the prospect of hearing Harry's stories as her own grandparents were reluctant to share their Jewish heritage and memories of the old country (Since Then). Harry is reluctant to share, so Barbara asks him to write about his daily life (Write What You See). He shares details from his life, but won't share why he keeps a jar of jellybeans in his kitchen or why he kept them at work, because Frannie (or rather, Frannie's ghost) tells him not to “tell her nothing you never told me.”

Later, Harry is writing a letter to someone deceased as part of an assignment from Barbara. He chooses to write a letter to his friend, late gay politician Harvey Milk, who had been assassinated eight years prior. He reveals that he keeps the jelly beans in memory of “Harveleh,” and laments his friend's assassination and its aftermath (Love, Harry).

It is revealed that Barbara is a lesbian and that her family has cut off contact with her. Frannie laments Barbara's sexuality to Harry, who seems to empathize with Barbara (What A Shanda). Later, Harry reflects on missing his wife in an assignment from Barbara (Frannie's Hands).

Later, Barbara and Harry go out to eat at a Jewish deli, where the waiters celebrate, with the help of food, the triumphs of the Jewish people over those who sought to destroy them (Turning Tables). Barbara connects these struggles and triumphs to those of the gay community. She then shares the story of her first love and heartbreak (Love Is A Woman).

Later, Frannie urges Harry to reconnect with his own daughter Gracie, whom he has not spoken to since she married a “goy” (a person not of the Jewish faith) and stopped practicing Judaism, drawing parallels between him and Barbara's parents (Honor Thy Daughter). Later, Harry reminisces about his friendship with Harvey (No One’ll Do For You). He fights with Barbara after telling her that they were getting “too close” to many painful memories. Barbara is upset for getting close to Harry and letting him make her feel like she wasn't alone (Too Close). The fight brings Harry to wonder exactly how close he and his wife had been, and they share a tense duet about how they were content not to pry too much into the details of each other's lives (Weren't We?)

Later, Harry remembers Harvey again, this time reminiscing about Harvey's use of Harry's words for his campaign (I'm Gonna Do For You). Back in class, Barbara shares her own writing about how much Harry's letter to Harvey Milk meant to her (A Letter To Harvey Milk). Frannie begins a reprise of “Thanks to Her,” lamenting that Barbara wants to share Harry's writing, when Harry notices a pink triangle on his teacher's shirt. This sight upsets him greatly and prompts him to share the story of his experience in a concentration camp during the Holocaust, in which he became lovers with his male friend Yussl, who eventually allowed himself to be killed for being gay by the Nazis in order to save Harry's life. Harry hadn't thought about Yussl in many years, but shares his story with Barbara and reminds her that the pink triangle, which was used to mark homosexuals in Nazi concentration camps, has a very different meaning to his generation than it does to hers (Harry's Narrative).

The finale sees Frannie's ghost leave Harry, and Barbara and Harry make up. Harry offers his notebook to Barbara, saying that he couldn't write anymore but that she could publish his letter to Harvey. He tells her that if she were his “tochter” (Yiddish for daughter), he'd be proud of her (Finale).

== Musical Numbers ==
1.Overture/Nightmare (Orchestra, Harry) 2. Too Old For This (Harry, Frannie)

3. Thanks To Her (Harry, Frannie)

4. Since Then (Barbara)

5. Write What You See (Barbara, Harry, Frannie)

6. Love, Harry (Harry, Ensemble)

7. What A Shanda (Frannie)

8. Frannie's Hands (Harry, Frannie)

9. Weren't We? (Harry, Frannie)

10. Turning The Tables (Waiters, Barbara, Harry)

11. Love Is A Woman (Barbara)

12. Honor Thy Daughter (Frannie)

13. No One’ll Do For You (Harry, Harvey)

14. Too Close (Barbara, Harry, Frannie)

15. I'm Gonna Do For You (Harvey, Harry)

16. A Letter To Harvey Milk (Barbara)

17. Harry's Narrative (Harry, Yussl, Nazi)

18. Finale (Entire Cast)

== Cast ==
Character	2012 New York Musical Theatre Festival	2018 Off-broadway
Harry		Adam Heller
Barbara Katsef		Julia Knitel
Harvey Milk		Michael Bartoli
Frannie		Cheryl Stern

== Characters ==
• Harry – a lonely, retired Kosher butcher.

• Frannie – Harry's deceased wife. At the start of the show, she is “woken up” by Harry's scream as he wakes up from a nightmare.

• Barbara – Harry's writing teacher and an aspiring writer. She is both Jewish and a lesbian, whose coming out caused her family to cut her off.

• Harvey Milk – Based on the gay San Francisco politician who was assassinated in 1978. In the musical, he was friends with Harry, who struggles with his death.

• Yussl – Izzie's deceased friend and lover from the old country with whom he was imprisoned during the Holocaust.

• Nazi – Nazi guard in the camp in which Harry and Yussl were imprisoned.
