= J. Lawrence Cogan =

American coroner (1944–2026)

Acting Chief Medical Examiner-Coroner for the County of Los Angeles
- In office July 12, 1990 – February 18, 1992
- Preceded by: Ronald Kornblum
- Succeeded by: Lakshmanan Sathyavagiswaran

Personal details
- Born: December 25, 1944 Aurora, Illinois, U.S.
- Died: January 15, 2026 (aged 81)
- Education: Loyola University Chicago
- Occupation: Coroner

Joseph Lawrence Cogan (December 25, 1944 – January 15, 2026) was an American coroner who served as acting Chief Medical Examiner-Coroner for the County of Los Angeles from 1990 to 1992.

== Early career ==
Cogan graduated from Loyola University Chicago's Stritch School of Medicine. From 1971 to 1973 he served in the United States Army as a general medical officer and briefly served in Vietnam during the Vietnam War. He completed his pathology residency at Loyola University Medical Center.

== Los Angeles County ==
In 1977 he joined the Los Angeles County Medical Examiner's and Coroner's Office. In 1986 he became senior medical examiner, the third-highest medical position in the department. He supervised deputy medical examiners and residents in forensic pathology.

Autopsies performed by Cogan include those on Dennis Wilson and Charlotte Lamb (victim of Rodney Alcala).

=== Acting Chief Medical Examiner-Coroner ===
In 1990 Cogan was appointed acting Chief Medical Examiner-Coroner following the resignation of Ronald Kornblum. During his tenure in this position, the county's murder rate jumped by 18% and the office struggled to keep up with the high murder toll of 38 homicides per week. In 1991, the office conducted 6,256 autopsies and investigated 18,068 suspicious or violent deaths (including 2,401 possible homicides). Los Angeles County Supervisor Deane Dana described the office as "operating smooth as glass" under Cogan.

After the Los Angeles County Board of Supervisors' first selection for Chief Medical Examiner-Coroner, Dr. Joshua Perper of Allegheny County, Pennsylvania, declined the job due to Los Angeles' high housing costs and its second choice, Dr. Yong-Myun Rho, of Queens, New York thrice failed the state medical exam, it appeared that Cogan would get the job. However, the department's chief of forensic medicine, Lakshmanan Sathyavagiswaran, was selected instead after the Board of Supervisors received a letter signed by several deputy medical examiners recommending the consideration of in house candidates rather than appointing an outsider.

== Cook County ==
Cogan later left Los Angeles to serve as an assistant medical examiner in Cook County, Illinois. He was also contracted to perform autopsies for Kane County, Illinois.

== Death ==
Cogan died on January 15, 2026, at the age of 81.
