= She Freak =

- Theatrical release poster
- Directed by: Bryon Mabe
- Written by: David F. Friedman
- Based on: Freaks by Tod Browning
- Produced by: David F. Friedman
- Starring: Claire Brennen; Lee Raymond; Lynn Courtney; Bill McKinney
- Cinematography: William Troiano
- Edited by: Byron Mabe
- Music by: William Castleman
- Production company: Sonney-Friedman Pictures
- Distributed by: Producers Releasing Corporation
- Release date: May 3, 1967
- Running time: 87 minutes
- Country: United States
- Language: English
- Budget: $75,000

She Freak (sometimes stylized as She-Freak) is a 1967 American exploitation horror film directed by Byron Mabe and starring Claire Brennen, Lee Raymond, and Lynn Courtney. It is an unofficial remake of the 1932 film Freaks. An alternate version of the film, titled Asylum of the Insane, was also released, and features inserts shot by Donn Davison.

== Plot ==
Jade Cochran is an incredulous, cynical waitress who works at a rundown cafe. Determined to escape her lowly life and earn extra money, she agrees to take a second job serving meals to the workers of a traveling carnival sideshow that has arrived in town. She soon makes friends with Pat, a stripper, and Steve St. John, the owner of the carnival and overseer of the freakshow exhibit.

Allured by Steve's wealth, Jade sets her intent on romancing and marrying him for his money. Jade manages to woo Steve, and the two eventually marry, though Jade continues to carry on an affair with Blackie Fleming, a gruff ride operator at the carnival. Steve soon confronts Blackie about the tryst, and the two get into a violent tussle in which Blackie stabs Steve to death. Blackie is convicted of Steve's murder, and Jade happily inherits Steve's assets, including the carnival.

Jade begins abusing her newfound power as the owner of the carnival, and fires Shortie, a dwarf in the freakshow who originally informed Steve of Jade's indiscretion with Blackie. In retaliation, Shortie and the other carnival freaks band together and corner Jade at the carnival, viciously attacking her. Some time later, Jade, grossly mutilated and without legs, is placed on exhibit in the carnival's freakshow as the 'Snake Woman'.

== Cast ==
- Claire Brennen as Jade Cochran
- Lee Raymond as Blackie Fleming
- Lynn Courtney as Pat 'Moon' Mullins
- Bill McKinney as Steve St. John
- Claude Earl Jones as Greasy
- Ben Moore as Ben Thomas
- Vanteen as Al Babcock
- Madame Lee as Snake Charmer
- Marsha Drake as Olga
- Felix Silla as Shorty
- William Bagdad as Pretty-Boy
- Elmer McCurdy as Movie Prop

== Production ==
Writer-producer David F. Friedman admitted the film was "an outright remake" of Tod Browning's 1932 horror film Freaks.

She Freak was filmed on a budget of $75,000 at the Kern County Fair in Bakersfield, California.

The film used the corpse of bandit Elmer McCurdy as a prop in the film, despite his death occurring more than 50 years prior.

== Release ==
She Freak premiered on May 3, 1967, in Minneapolis, Minnesota. It had its Los Angeles premiere on October 11, 1967, as a double bill with The Brides of Fu Manchu (1966).

== Critical response ==
Robert Firsching of AllMovie notes: "This entertaining sexploitation update of Freaks from producer David Friedman and director B. Ron Elliott (using the pseudonym "Byron Mabe") has its moments for sympathetic viewers."

== Sources ==
- Senn, Bryan (2015). A Year of Fear: A Day-by-Day Guide to 366 Horror Films. Jefferson, North Carolina: McFarland. ISBN 978-1-476-61090-0.
