= Frank Dale =

American lawyer

- Born: November 26, 1849; DeKalb County, Illinois
- Died: February 10, 1930 (aged 80); Guthrie, Oklahoma
- Occupations: Teacher, Attorney, Judge, businessman
- Years active: 1871-1930
- Known for: Chief Justice, Oklahoma Territorial Supreme Court

Frank Dale (November 26, 1849 – February 10, 1930) was the second Chief Justice of the Territorial Supreme Court of Oklahoma Territory, serving from 1893 until 1898. Born in Somonauk, Illinois, he pioneered both in Kansas and Oklahoma, becoming a well-known attorney in both states. Both the towns of Andale, Kansas, and Dale, Oklahoma, are named for him. In 1893, he settled in Guthrie, which became the capital of Oklahoma Territory, and was named Governor of the territory. Although originally a Republican, sometime after moving to Oklahoma, he became a Democrat. He continued to live in Guthrie until his death in 1930.

== Early life ==
Frank Dale was born on a farm in Somonauk, Illinois, DeKalb County, Illinois on November 26, 1849, to Frank Dale Sr. and Mariah (née Webster). where he received a public school education and graduated from the high school at Leland, Illinois. Both parents had emigrated from England. His father, who had become an adult in Pennsylvania, and had moved first to Michigan, then to Illinois, where he became a farmer and a merchant grain dealer, was a part-time Methodist minister. Frank, Jr. was the next to youngest of eight children born into the family. Frank, Jr. enlisted in the Union Army at age 14. His military career was cut short because his father called on Governor Yates to promptly discharge his under-age son.

== Life in Kansas ==
In 1871, he left Illinois, established a homestead in Sedgwick County, Kansas, where he taught school and studied law for three or four years, until he was admitted to the bar in 1880. From January, 1881 until early 1885, he served as Assistant County Attorney for Sedgwick County. Then he moved to Wichita, Kansas, where he continued to study law until he passed the bar exam. He practiced law until 1885, when President Grover Cleveland appointed him as Registrar of the Wichita Land Office. (Note: The experience he gained in handling land disputes would prove extremely valuable a few years later, after he moved to his legal practice before the land office in Guthrie after the Land Run.) He resigned this office shortly after Oklahoma Territory was opened for settlement in 1889. Dale settled in Guthrie, then the capital of Oklahoma Territory.

On April 10, 1885, Dale married Miss Martha Wood.

== Move to Oklahoma ==
After arriving in Guthrie by train on April 22, 1889, Dale very soon established a law practice with W. W. Thomas. Both men were listed in the August 1889 issue of the Guthrie directory, each with "formerly of Wichita" after their names. A third party named McClain never came to Guthrie. Dale soon quit the partnership with Thomas and began a solo practice. One biography claims he never left Guthrie except for occasional vacations, and said that later in life he was called "first citizen of Guthrie."

Guthrie had no tax base when it started. The city enacted fees on practicing professions to finance itself. In 1926, Dale admitted during a speech that he had been put in jail briefly during 1889 for failure to pay his fee. He said he was soon released and never had any adverse political repercussions.

One of Dale's early clients in Guthrie was W. J. Gault, who was accused of "Soonerism" The charged accused of Gault of stationing relays of horses in the territory before the run began, so he could get to the site he wanted more quickly that other contestants who started at the legal hour. To pay the lawyer's fee for defending him, Gault gave Dale half of the 160 acres he had claimed. (Note: The site Gault claimed later became choice property in what became downtown Oklahoma City. Both men profited handsomely after they each platted their acreage as city lots in 1898.)

Dale had been a faithful Republican while living in Kansas, which normally favored that party. Apparently he either had a change of heart, or he was a very astute politician, for he changed party affiliation to Democratic about the time he settled in Guthrie. Democratic President Grover Cleveland appointed Dale as Associate Justice of the Oklahoma Territory Supreme Court on May 20, 1893. In September, the President appointed him as chief justice for a term that would end on February 16, 1898.

Many anecdotes have been published about Dale's kindliness, as well as his concern for the victims of wrongdoing. He also knew the law thoroughly and had no patience for the perpetrators, especially those who tried to escape punishment based on some (usually arcane) technicality. One such case featured a plaintiff who was a loan shark that had been making small loans to railroad employees and charging them 20 percent monthly interest. The victims were normally already in financial straits and could not repay the lender. When the shark could not collect the money, he filed suit against the victims in Dale's court. When the case came before the court and Dale heard the details from the plaintiff's attorney, he told the attorney that the plaintiff was practicing usury, and therefore the plaintiff could not collect. The attorney told Dale that there was no law against usury in Oklahoma. Dale replied, "There may not be any usuary law in Oklahoma, but this is a case of highway robbery and there is a law against that. And you can get no judgement in this court.".

Dale knew that he needed to deal harshly with outlaw bands who roamed the territory, seemingly at will, and often struck at judges that tried these men. One such person, Arkansas Tom Jones, a member of the Doolin Gang, was slated to be tried in for murder in Stillwater, Oklahoma. Treated with death himself, the usually fearless Dale surrounded himself with bodyguards before and during the trial. He also ordered posting armed marshals on every rooftop around the courthouse. After the trial was successfully concluded, Dale reportedly returned his own threat by telling one of his own men:

<Indent>"Marshal, this is serious. I have reached the conclusion that the only good outlaw is a dead one. I hope you will instruct your deputies in the future to bring them in dead."</Indent>

== Death and legacy ==
Frank Dale died in Guthrie, Oklahoma on February 10, 1930, and, after an elaborate funeral in the Presbyterian church of Guthrie, is buried in the Summit View Cemetery there, along with many other well-known Oklahoma pioneers. His wife, Martha, did not survive him long, for she died in June, 1930, and is buried beside him. The couple had no children.

During World War II, the US Merchant marine had a ship "SS Frank Dale". She sailed under charter to the North Atlantic & Gulf Steamship Company.
