= C. C. Pyle =

American sports agent

- Pyle in 1926

Personal information
- Born: March 26, 1882; Delaware, Ohio, U.S.
- Died: February 3, 1939 (aged 56); Los Angeles, California, U.S.

Career history
- American Football League (1926) Founder and team owner; Boston Bulldogs (1926); Chicago Bulls (1926); Los Angeles Wildcats (1926); New York Yankees (1926–1928) Team owner

Awards and highlights
- Started the first professional tennis tour; Inaugurated the first Trans-American Footrace

Charles C. "Charlie" Pyle (Note: The "C." was an initial only.) (March 26, 1882 – February 3, 1939), sometimes derisively referred to as "Cash and Carry Pyle," was a theater owner and sports entertainment promoter best known for his touring exhibitions featuring American football star Red Grange and French tennis player Suzanne Lenglen.

Pyle was the founder of the New York Yankees football club in 1926, owning it until the team's demise at the end of the 1928 season.

== Biography ==
=== Early life ===
Charlie Pyle was born March 26, 1882, in Delaware, Ohio, the son of a Methodist preacher. He was large and athletic, standing about 6 feet 1 inch (1.85 m) and weighing 190 pounds (86 kg) in his prime, and he participated in boxing as a boy.

Pyle dropped out of Ohio State University and headed west, where the loquacious and ambitious young man became involved in a series of business ventures and money-making schemes — selling Western Union clocks, starting a modest travel agency, and dipping his toe into show business as an advance man for a touring Margarita Fischer vaudeville road show. He started his own small touring company and in 1908 became involved in the movie business, buying a projector and a few films and taking the show on the road. He later bought an amusement park and small vaudeville theater in Idaho before liquidating his assets and moving back to the Midwest.

Pyle became involved in the theater business, owning the Virginia and the Park theaters in Champaign, Illinois — home of the Illinois Fighting Illini football team — as well as a third in Kokomo, Indiana. Pyle paid close attention to his personal grooming, reportedly visiting a barber twice a week and dressing neatly.

=== Signing Red Grange ===
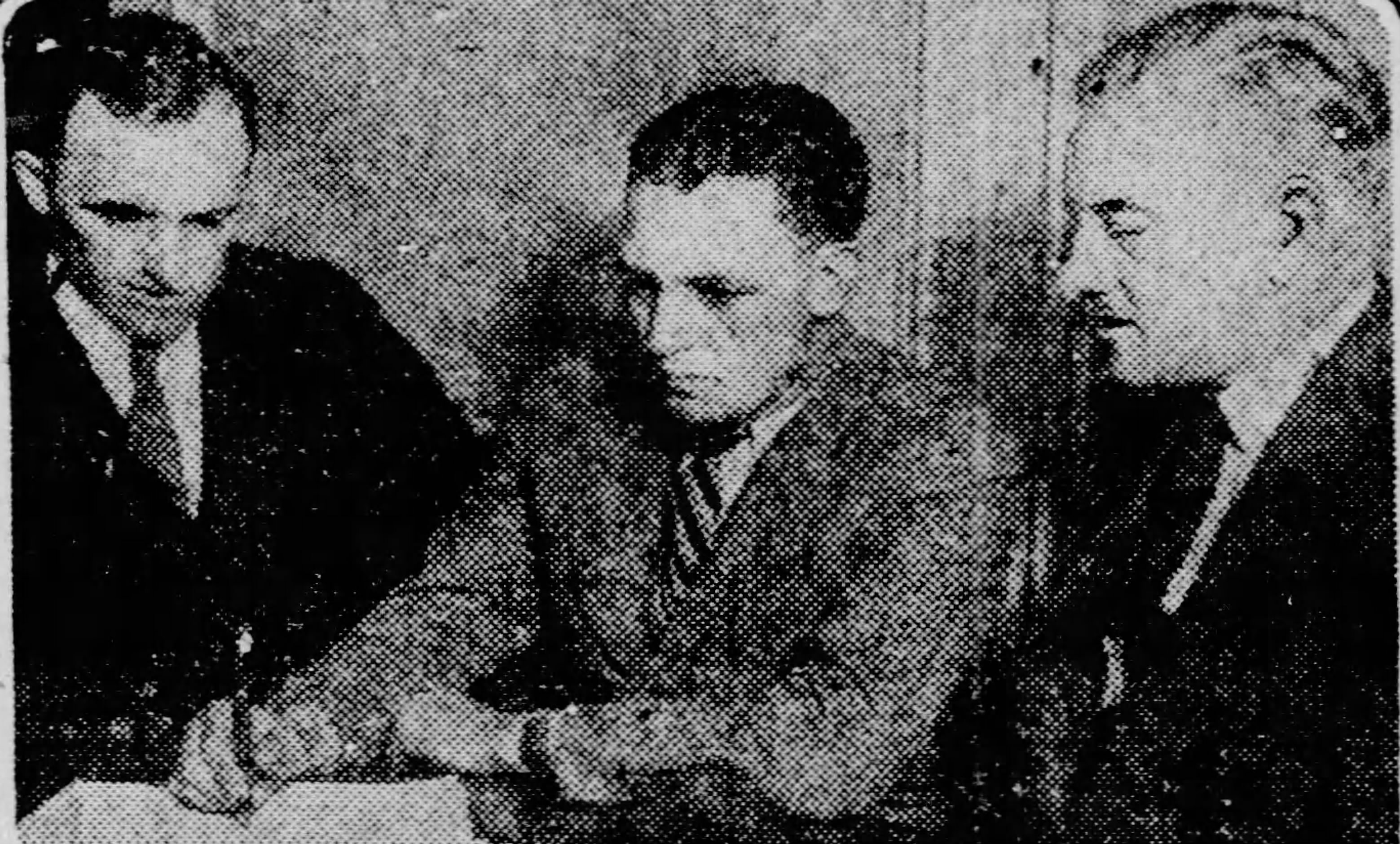
Grange (center) signing his contract with the Bears, while Pyle (right) and George Halas (left) look on

An avid football fan, Pyle spotted star Illini halfback Red Grange seated in the back row of the Virginia theater in the fall of 1924, Grange's junior year, and sent an usher down to bring him to the office so that he could meet him. Pyle gave Grange a complimentary season pass to the Virginia and Park theaters, which was frequently used, keeping the pair in contact for the duration of Grange's stay at the university.

As the All-American Grange began to emerge as a national sports hero during his junior season of 1924, Pyle began to see the shifty running back as a potential commercial asset. One night early in 1925 Pyle sent an usher to Grange's seat in the Virginia Theater calling him to his office. When Grange entered and sat, Pyle hit him with an unforgettable proposition, asking, "Red, how'd you like to make a hundred thousand dollars?" Grange's interest was piqued.

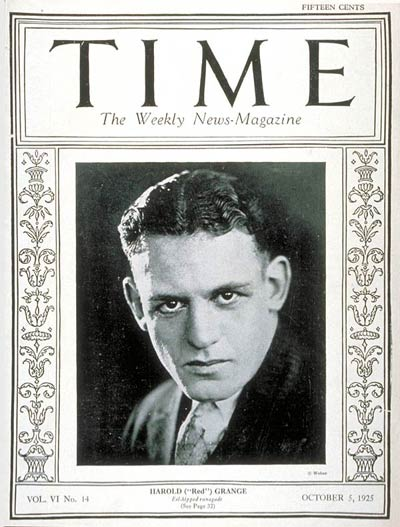
Harold "Red" Grange, whom Pyle managed, was a huge national star, making the cover of Time magazine in 1925. Grange was the first football player to grace the magazine's cover.

"Pyle sensed that maybe some money might be made by showing me off like a sword swallower and he asked me what I intended to do upon leaving school," Grange later recalled

Pyle and Grange worked out a contract drawing up an agent–client relationship, with three individuals ultimately acting in concert as managers — Pyle; an older Illinois student of Grange's acquaintance, Marion "Doc" Cooley; and a business-savvy theater manager and friend of Pyle's, Byron F. Moore. The contract, signed by all four individuals on March 27, 1925 — that is, before the start of Grange's 1925 senior season at Illinois — was to take effect immediately following conclusion of the collegiate football year and included revenue generated by personal appearances, revenue from appearances in film, "professional football exhibitions," and use of Grange's name in advertising. Pyle and his associates agreed to take no public actions that might jeopardize Grange's amateur college athletic status before Thanksgiving Day 1925. Term of the contract was three years.

Grange later recalled that at the time "I did not have the slightest idea of playing professional football and intended to get into some commercial business and I know that at the time Pyle wasn't thinking about the National League. In fact he didn't know anything about it, having been in the theatrical game all his life."

With Grange's future in his hands under contract, Pyle traveled to Chicago and approached owners of the Chicago Bears, George Halas and Edward "Dutch" Sternaman with a business proposition. The deal Pyle negotiated on behalf of Grange as one of professional football's first agents proved mutually lucrative. Under terms of the contract, signed in November 1925, Grange would join the Bears as soon as the college football season concluded and would play for the team for the rest of the season, to be followed by a post-season barnstorming tour that Pyle and his associates would help arrange. In return, Grange — a superstar of the day — and his managers would receive a 50% share of gate receipts.

The Red Grange exhibition tour proved a smashing success. According to archival research by gridiron historian Chris Willis, the gross gate from 16 of the 19 dates of the Grange contract was just over $620,000, with the full 19-date schedule yielding $252,274.39 for the Pyle–Grange partnership. Although Grange's cut was only 40% due to the onerous terms of his management contract, the payout of just over $100,000 to Grange massively dwarfed that of any other football player of the era, in which a quality back might expect to receive as little as $125 or $150 a game. Pyle's 25% share came to just over $63,000.

Pyle also used his Hollywood connections to get Grange into pictures, with the handsome Illini hired to play the leading role of "'Red' Wade" in a fictional 1926 football film, One Minute to Play.

=== Founding the New York Yankees football team ===
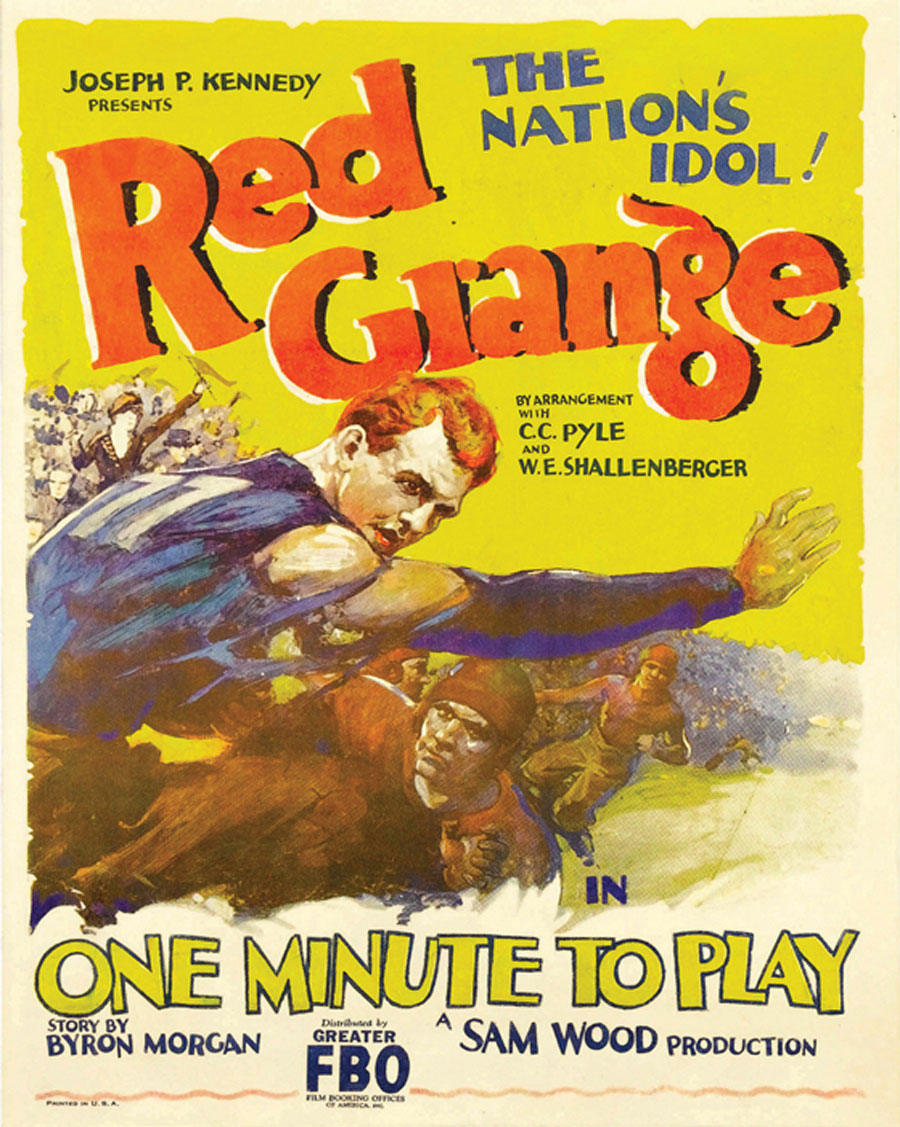
Pyle saw to it that his name on the poster of the 1926 Red Grange silent film, One Minute to Play.

Grange's contract with the Bears expired at the end of the 1925 season. Despite the deal's massive payout to the star player and his managers, Bears owners George Halas and Dutch Sternaman had also profited epically through the association and an interest was expressed in renewing the previous season's 50-50 deal. It was at this point, however, that Pyle overplayed his hand, demanding in addition to the revenue split, a one-third ownership stake for Grange in the Bears franchise. This proposal was resoundingly rejected as non-negotiable by Halas and Sternaman. Instead of relenting, Pyle pushed another avenue for acquiring ownership of a football club, seeking ownership of a new team.

Pyle sought a team in New York City as a sure-fire business proposition. However, in 1925 Tim Mara had purchased an NFL franchise for the New York Giants, guaranteeing him territorial rights to the city. Flush with success and loaded with cash from the successful 1925 Grange barnstorming tour, Pyle once again attempted to execute a power play by obtaining a 5-year lease for use of Yankee Stadium for football, booking every Sunday from the middle of October through the end of December. Lease in hand, Pyle crashed the NFL's annual winter owners' meeting in Detroit, held the weekend of February 6–7, 1926, announcing to the assembled owners, "I have the biggest star in football and I have a lease on the biggest stadium in the country, and I am going into your league."

In this era of a struggling league with anemic attendances and no alternative revenue stream to dollars coming through the gate, Mara firmly rejected the idea of another NFL franchise playing its games less than a mile from his home stadium. A heated debated followed, with personal enmity between the NFL owner and the prospective NFL owner boiling over. No compromise was forthcoming and Mara's objection — well within his rights — held sway with league president Joe F. Carr and other league owners. There would be no new New York NFL team for C.C. Pyle and Red Grange.

Not to be denied, Pyle determined not only to launch his "New York Yankees" football team, but to form an entire new professional football league for which it would be the centerpiece. The NFL was itself only six years old and still floundering financially, with teams starting and economic collapsing with uncomfortable regularity. On February 17, a mere eight days after the failure of his negotiations with the NFL, Pyle announced the formation of the American Football League. Pyle obtained an office in the plush Hotel Astor in New York City as the base of operations for his new organization.

Pyle then took his team into the NFL for the 1927 season. As one of only twelve teams in the league and splitting the lucrative New York City market with Tim Mara's New York Giants, Pyle had high expectations of financial success going into the year, telling one journalist that he hoped to clear $50,000 for his efforts. Pyle said that he carried 21 men on the roster, although only 18 were eligible in a given week due to league rules. These cost him approximately $3,500 per week, he reckoned.

Grange suffered a severe knee injury early in the 1927 system, for which he did not undergo surgery. Robbed of his ability to make explosive cuts as a halfback by his untreated injury, Grange's star faded.

Although the popular Red Grange remained a player and part owner of the Yankees, the number of tickets coming through the turnstile did not meet expectations, and the team folded after the 1928 season.

=== Professional tennis promoter ===
In 1926, Pyle signed Lenglen and several of the best tennis players in the world to start the first professional tennis tour, which traveled throughout the U.S. and Canada. Two years later, he inaugurated the first Trans-American Footrace, known as the "Bunion Derby", an ambitious, 3,455-mile-long foot race from Los Angeles, California, to Chicago, Illinois, to New York. Pyle lost money on the 1928 race when many towns along the route defaulted on their sponsorship fees. The next year, Pyle organized a 1929 "return" along essentially the same route from New York to Los Angeles.

=== Later years and legacy ===
After managing the "Ripley's Believe It or Not" exhibit in the Chicago World's Fair, Pyle married comedian Elvia Allman Tourtellotte in 1937. He became president of the Radio Transcription Company, a position that he held until his death of a heart attack in Los Angeles, February 3, 1939.

A play based on his life, C.C. Pyle and the Bunion Derby, was written by Tony Award winner Michael Cristofer and directed by Paul Newman.

== See also ==
- 1925 Chicago Bears season
