= Thomas Noguchi =

American coroner (born 1927)

- 野口恒富
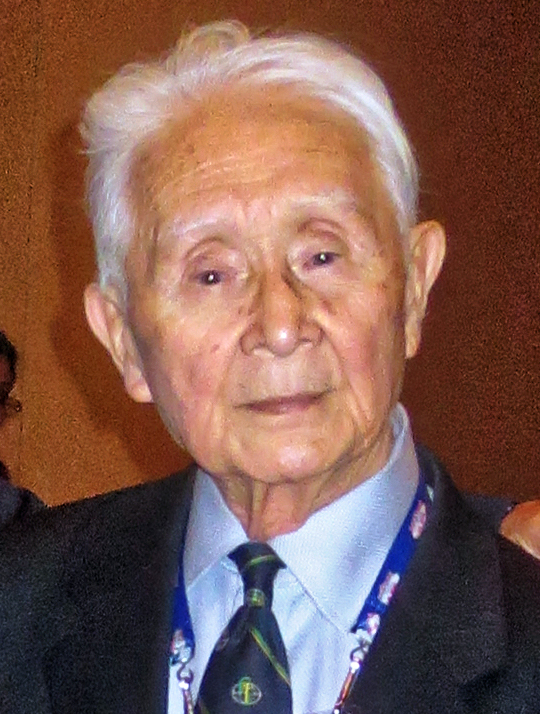
- Noguchi in 2016

Chief Medical Examiner-Coroner for the County of Los Angeles
- In office 1961–1982
- Preceded by: Theodore Curphey
- Succeeded by: Ronald Kornblum

Personal details
- Born: Thomas Tsunetomi Noguchi; January 4, 1927 (age 99) Fukuoka Prefecture, Empire of Japan
- Spouse: Hisako Nishihara (m. 1960; died 2014)
- Education: Nippon Medical School
- Occupation: Coroner, medical examiner

Thomas Tsunetomi Noguchi (野口 恒富, Noguchi Tsunetomi; born January 4, 1927) is a Japanese-American retired coroner. He was chief medical examiner-coroner for Los Angeles County. Popularly known as the "coroner to the stars", Noguchi determined the cause of death in many high-profile cases in Hollywood during the 1960s, 1970s, and 1980s. He performed autopsies on many celebrities, including John Belushi, Albert Dekker, William Holden, David Janssen, Janis Joplin, Robert F. Kennedy, Harris Glenn Milstead, Marilyn Monroe, Gia Scala, Inger Stevens, Sharon Tate, and Natalie Wood.

== Early life and education ==
Noguchi was born in Fukuoka Prefecture, raised in Yokosuka and graduated from Tokyo's Nippon Medical School in 1951 before interning at the University of Tokyo School of Medicine Hospital. Shortly thereafter he immigrated to the United States. He then served a second internship at Orange County General Hospital and a series of residencies at Loma Linda University School of Medicine, and Barlow Sanatorium in Los Angeles.

== Career ==
=== Early career ===
Noguchi began working in the office of the Chief Medical Examiner-Coroner for the County of Los Angeles (CME) in 1961, and came to public attention after performing the autopsy of Marilyn Monroe.

In 1967, he was appointed Chief Medical Examiner-Coroner for the County of Los Angeles (CME) in a 3–2 vote of the Los Angeles County Board of Supervisors, over the opposition of the Los Angeles County Medical Association and leadership of the UCLA and USC schools of medicine. As new CME, he succeeded his mentor Theodore Curphey and supervised autopsies on a range of celebrities and public figures that included John Belushi, Albert Dekker, William Holden, David Janssen, Janis Joplin, Gia Scala, Inger Stevens, Sharon Tate, and Natalie Wood.

=== Robert F. Kennedy assassination and resignation ===
Noguchi's autopsy of Sen. Robert F. Kennedy concluded that the fatal shot was fired into the back of Kennedy's head, behind the right ear, at an upward angle, and from a distance of no more than 0.5 to 3 inches (15–75 mm). That finding has given rise to conspiracy theories regarding the assassination, as no witnesses reported seeing the convicted assassin, Sirhan Sirhan, any closer than two feet from Kennedy or in a position to fire such a shot. Noguchi himself pointed out in his memoir, Coroner, that he never officially ruled that Sirhan fired the fatal shot.

Shortly after the Kennedy shooting, Noguchi came under scrutiny and resigned under pressure as Chief Medical Examiner after Deputy Los Angeles County Counsel Martin Weekes testified that he had seen a smiling Noguchi dancing in his office and that Noguchi had announced to associates "I am going to be famous. I hope he dies." A secretary in the coroner's office also testified she had heard Noguchi say he wanted to perform a vivisection on Lin Hollinger, the county's chief administrative officer with whom he had argued over budget matters.

=== Second term as CME and demotion ===
Shortly after signing his letter of resignation, Noguchi attempted to withdraw it, a move that was rejected by the Board of Supervisors. Noguchi's wife subsequently charged that the county had forced him out as a practice of racial discrimination. The county rebutted the accusation by accusing Noguchi himself of being racist, providing testimony from an Asian-American employee in the CME office who said she had heard Noguchi saying he hated Jews and using a racial epithet to describe Black Americans. Other CME staff disputed that testimony and characterized Noguchi as "warm" and "articulate."

After a petition drive organized by Los Angeles' Japanese American community, Noguchi was restored to the office of CME.

In his second term, Noguchi was accused of speaking too freely to the media, particularly following the November 1981 deaths of William Holden and Natalie Wood, which, along with his moonlighting and alleged mismanagement – a series of articles in the Los Angeles Times alleged that Noguchi's attention to celebrity deaths was causing problems in the more mundane aspects of the CME office – led to his demotion from coroner to physician specialist in 1982. His ruling of Wood's death as an accident has since been questioned. Dr. Michael Franco, a former intern of Noguchi at the time of Wood's death, stated that he saw bruises on Wood's body which were substantial and consistent with someone who was thrown out of a boat. Franco claimed that he made those observations to Noguchi, who reacted strangely as if he was involved in a cover-up. In 2012, Noguchi came under renewed public criticism for his handling of Wood's autopsy and his original ruling in that case was later changed by a successor.

=== Later career, honors and professional bodies ===
Noguchi was later appointed Chief of Pathology at the University of Southern California and then as Administrative Pathologist for Anatomic Pathology services at LAC+USC Medical Center.

Noguchi was appointed professor by both the University of Southern California and UCLA. He is a past president of the American National Association of Medical Examiners. In 1999 he was honored by the Emperor of Japan who awarded him the Order of the Sacred Treasure for his "outstanding contributions to Japan in the area of forensic science." He retired the same year.

From 2010 to 2022, Noguchi was the president of World Association for Medical Law (WAML), a medical body founded in 1967 to encourage the study of health law, legal medicine, and bioethics.

Noguchi appears as a character in the musical Dead Outlaw, about the life and posthumous display of Elmer McCurdy. The part was originated by Thom Sesma.

== Personal life ==
Noguchi was married to microbiologist Hisako Nishihara (1922–2014) from 1960 until their divorce in 1982. They later got back together and Noguchi was at her side when she died.

== Books ==
- Coroner, 1983. Memoir written with Joseph DiMona. (Published in the UK as Coroner to the Stars)
- Coroner at Large 1985. A book about historical coroners and famous deaths. (NYT review.)
- Unnatural Causes, 1988. A detective novel written with Arthur Lyons.
- Physical Evidence, 1990. A detective novel written with Arthur Lyons.
