= Trans-American Footrace =

Early foot race across the United States

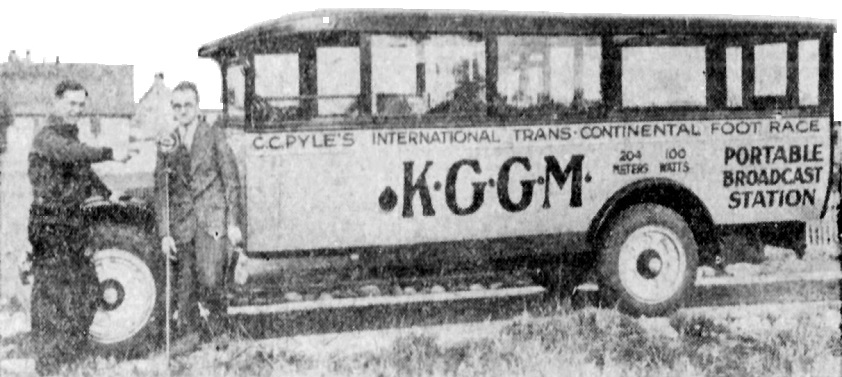
1928 publicity photograph of KGGM (now KNML), a "portable broadcast station" hired by C. C. Pyle, which each evening transmitted reports along the route of the race

The Trans-American Footrace, also known as the Bunion Derby, was one of the earliest 20th century multiday footraces. In 1928, the race went from Los Angeles to Chicago then on to New York City, a distance of slightly more than 3,400 miles (5,500 km). In 1929, it followed essentially the same route in the opposite direction.

== 1928 and 1929 editions ==
The inaugural Trans-American Footrace, called the Bunion Derby by newspapers, took place in 1928 starting at Legion Ascot Speedway in Los Angeles and finishing in New York City in Madison Square Garden for a distance of 3,423.5 miles (5,509.6 km). The Los Angeles to Chicago section of the event followed U.S. Highway 66.

Out of the 199 runners who left Los Angeles on March 4, 1928, at 3:30 p.m., only 55 runners finished on May 26, 1928. The race took 84 days to run from coast to coast. Andy Payne won the event in 573 hours, 4 minutes, 34 seconds, averaging 6 miles per hour (9.7 km/h) over the 84-day staged run.

The race was organized by C. C. Pyle and was also held in 1929; that edition started in New York City and ended in Los Angeles.

Johnny Salo, who finished in second place in 1928 and in first place in 1929, became the fastest person to twice run across the continental United States in consecutive years.

== Recent races ==
A coast-to-coast race has taken place several times since, including four races organized by Jessie Dale Riley and Michael Kenney from 1992 to 1995. Alan Firth organised two events in 2002 and 2004.

In 2011 ultrarunner Serge Girard planned a new edition running from Los Angeles to New York starting June 19 and lasting for 70 days.

On May 20, 2012, ultrarunner John Pyle completed a run from San Francisco to Key West. His run began on February 29, 2012.

On August 18, 2012, ultrarunner Jennifer Bradley became the second British woman to cross America on foot but the first to run across and make it in 80 days during the Run Across America on Trail 2012. Her trip started May 31, 2012, at Twin Harbors State Park in Washington, and she was on the trail 720 hours 26.7 minutes.

Also on August 18, 2012, ultrarunner Mike Samuelson of Tennessee completed the same Run Across America on Trail 2012 of 3,303 miles (5,316 km) at Cape Henlopen State Park in Delaware on a journey that had started May 31, 2012, with four runners. He was on trail 719 hours 47.2 minutes.

On June 2, 2015, British ultra runner Robert HP Young won the 2015 Race Across USA footrace with a time of 482 hours 10 minutes. The race started in Huntington Beach, California, and took the southern route on both road and trail to the Chesapeake Bay in Maryland with a total distance of 3,127 miles (5,032 km). Young subsequently attempted a solo run across the U.S. in 2016 to break the crossing record, though stopped part-way. Investigations concluded that his time could not have been a true reflection of his performance, and he was dropped by his sponsors.

== See also ==
- Trans America Run

== Sources ==
- Williams, Geoff. C.C. Pyle's Amazing Foot Race: The True Story of the 1928 Coast-to-Coast Run Across America. July 10, 2007. ISBN 1-59486-319-9
