= Echo & the Bunnymen discography =

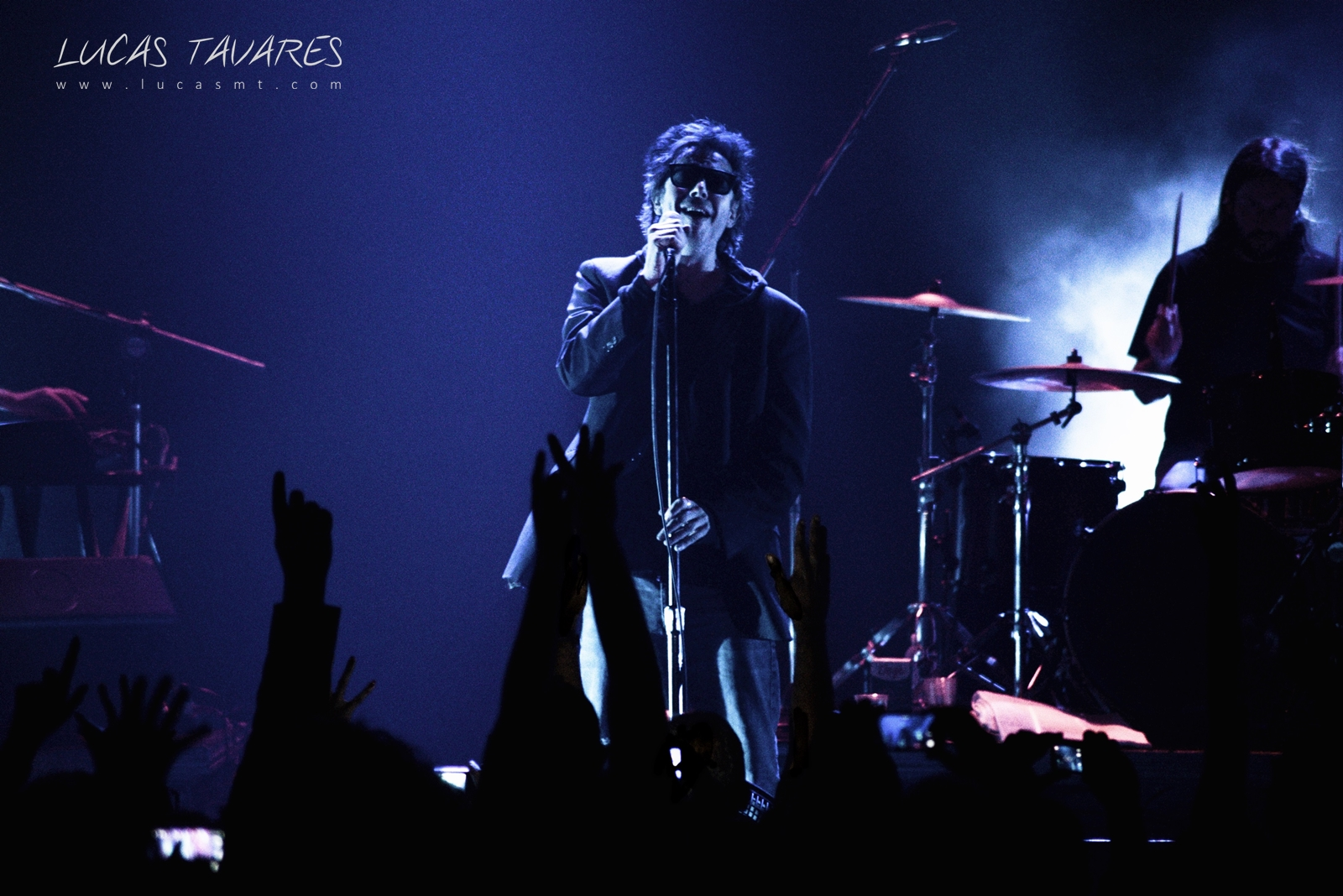
- Echo & the Bunnymen in concert in Rio de Janeiro in 2012
- Studio albums: 12
- Extended plays: 8
- Live albums: 10
- Compilation albums: 12
- Singles: 30
- Video albums: 5
- Music videos: 22

The discography of Echo & the Bunnymen, an English post-punk band which formed in 1978, consists of twelve studio albums, ten live albums, twelve compilation albums, eight extended plays (EP), and thirty singles on Zoo Records; WEA and its subsidiaries, Korova, Sire Records, London Records and Rhino; Cooking Vinyl; and Ocean Rain Records, as well as five music VHS/DVDs, and twenty-two music videos.

Echo & the Bunnymen's original line-up consisted of vocalist Ian McCulloch, guitarist Will Sergeant and bass player Les Pattinson, supplemented by a drum machine. By 1980, Pete de Freitas had joined as the band's drummer, and their debut album, Crocodiles, met with critical acclaim and made the UK Top 20. Their second album, Heaven Up Here (1981), again found favour with critics and reached number 10 in the UK. The band's cult status was followed by mainstream success in the mid-1980s, as they scored a UK Top 10 hit with the single "The Cutter", and the attendant album, Porcupine (1983), which reached number two in the UK. The next release, Ocean Rain (1984), regarded as their landmark release, spawned the hit singles "The Killing Moon", "Silver" and "Seven Seas". One more studio album, Echo & the Bunnymen (1987), was released before McCulloch left the band to pursue a solo career in 1988. The following year, de Freitas was killed in a motorcycle accident, and the band re-emerged with a new line-up. Sergeant and Pattinson were joined by Noel Burke as lead singer, Damon Reece on drums and Jake Brockman on keyboards. They released Reverberation in 1990, but the disappointing critical and commercial reaction it received culminated with a complete disbanding in early 1993.

After working together as Electrafixion, McCulloch, Sergeant and Pattinson regrouped in 1997 and returned as Echo & the Bunnymen with the UK Top 10 hit "Nothing Lasts Forever". An album of new material, Evergreen, was greeted enthusiastically by critics and the band made a successful return to the live arena. Though Pattinson left the group for a second time, McCulloch and Sergeant continue to record as Echo & the Bunnymen, releasing What Are You Going to Do with Your Life? (1999), Flowers (2001), Siberia (2005), The Fountain (2009), and Meteorites (2014).

== Albums ==
=== Studio albums ===
Title	Album details	Peak chart positions							Certifications
Title	Album details	UK	AUS	US	CAN	FRA	SWE	NZ	Certifications
Crocodiles	Released: 18 July 1980; Label: Korova (#KODE 1); Formats: LP, cassette	17	—	—	—	—	—	36	BPI: Gold
Heaven Up Here	Released: 24 June 1981; Label: Sire (#SIRE 3); Format: LP	10	—	184	—	—	—	17	
Porcupine	Released: 23 February 1983; Label: Sire (#SIRE 6); Format: LP	2	47	137	85	—	24	15	BPI: Gold
Ocean Rain	Released: 24 August 1984; Label: Sire (#SIRE 8); Formats: LP, cassette	4	58	87	41	—	22	10	BPI: Gold
Echo & the Bunnymen	Released: 6 July 1987; Label: Sire (#SIRE 108); Formats: LP, CD	4	70	51	51	—	22	26	BPI: Silver
Reverberation	Released: 5 November 1990; Label: Sire (#SIRE 14); Formats: LP, Cassette, CD	—	—	—	—	—	—	—	
Evergreen	Released: 1 July 1997; Label: London (#828 905-2); Format: CD	8	98	—	—	—	—	—	BPI: Gold
What Are You Going to Do with Your Life?	Released: 1 June 1999; Label: London (#556 080-2); Format: CD	21	—	—	—	—	—	—	
Flowers	Released: 22 May 2001; Label: Cooking Vinyl (#COOK 208); Formats: CD, LP	56	—	—	—	—	—	—	
Siberia	Released: 20 September 2005; Label: Cooking Vinyl (#COOK CD 297); Format: CD	83	—	—	—	161	—	—	
The Fountain	Released: 10 November 2009; Label: Ocean Rain (#OCEAN001CD); Formats: CD, download	63	—	—	—	176	—	—	
Meteorites	Released: 3 June 2014; Label: 429; Formats: CD, download	37	—	138	—	—	—	—	
Apples for Isaac	Released: 18 September 2026; Label: BMG; Formats: CD, download	19	—	—	—	—	—	—	

=== Live albums ===
Title	Album details
BBC Radio 1 Live in Concert	Released: 18 September 1992; Label: Windsong International (#WINCD006); Format: CD
Live in Liverpool	Released: 6 June 2002; Label: Cooking Vinyl (#COOK CD 223); Format: CD
Instant Live: Fillmore – San Francisco, CA, 12/5/05	Released: 2006; Label: Instant Live; Format: CD
Instant Live: House of Blues – West Hollywood, CA, 12/6/05	Released: 2006; Label: Instant Live; Format: CD
Instant Live: House of Blues – Anaheim, CA, 12/7/05	Released: 2006; Label: Instant Live; Format: CD
Instant Live: House of Blues – San Diego, CA, 12/9/05	Released: 2006; Label: Instant Live; Format: CD
Me, I'm All Smiles	Released: 18 September 2006; Label: Secret (#SMACD 938); Format: CD
Breaking the Back of Love	Released: April 2008; Label: Great American (#CD-GA-964); Format: CD
Ocean Rain Live 2008	Released: 31 May 2009; Labels: Echo & The Bunnymen, California Dreamin'; Formats: CD+DVD, download
Do It Clean	Released: 13 June 2011; Label: Ocean Rain Records; Format: CD
It's All Live Now	Released: 2017; Label: Run Out Groove; Format: LP

=== Compilation albums ===
Title	Album details	Peak chart positions				Certifications
Title	Album details	UK	AUS	US	NZ	Certifications
Songs to Learn & Sing	Released: 11 November 1985; Label: Korova (#KODE 13); Formats: LP, cassette, CD	6	57	158	25	BPI: Gold
The Cutter	Released: 15 March 1993; Label: WEA (#4509 91886-2); Format: CD	—	—	—	—	
Ballyhoo	Released: 1997; Label: WEA (#0630-19103-2); Format: CD	59	—	—	—	BPI: Silver
Crystal Days: 1979–1999	Released: 17 July 2001; Label: Rhino (#R2 74263); Format: 4-CD box set	—	—	—	—	
Seven Seas	Released: 12 September 2005; Label: WEA (#5101-10402-2); Format: CD	20	—	—	—	
More Songs to Learn and Sing	Released: 11 September 2006; Label: Korova (#KODE 1011 Z); Format: CD	47	—	—	—	
Killing Moon: The Best of Echo & the Bunnymen	Released: 3 December 2007; Label: Music Club Deluxe (#MCDLX075); Format: CD	—	—	—	—	BPI: Silver
B-sides & Live	Released: 3 December 2007; Label: Cooking Vinyl; Format: Digital download	—	—	—	—	
The Works	Released: 31 March 2008; Labels: Rhino, WEA (#427747); Format: 3-CD box set	—	—	—	—	
The Killing Moon – The Singles 1980–1990	Released: 7 July 2017; Labels: Warner Music Group; Format: CD	—	—	—	—	
The Stars, the Oceans & the Moon	Released 5 October 2018; Labels BMG; Format: CD	11	—	—	—	
The John Peel Sessions 1979–1983	Released: 6 September 2019; Labels: Korova, WEA; Format: Vinyl, MP3, CD	—	—	—	—	
"—" denotes releases that did not chart.

=== Other album appearances ===
Year	Song	Album	Notes
1979	"Monkeys"	Street To Street: A Liverpool Album	The title was misspelled as "Monkies" on the sleeve and inner record label.
1981	"The Puppet"	Urgh! A Music War soundtrack	Live version recorded at the Lyceum Ballroom, London on 7 September 1980.
1982	"Villiers Terrace"	To the Shores of Lake Placid	A previously unreleased version from the 1979 John Peel session.
1982	"All That Jazz"	Life in the European Theater	
1984	"Zimbo"	Raindrops Pattering on Banana Leaves and Other Tunes	Live performance from the 1982 WOMAD festival with The Royal Burundi Drummers.
1991	"Action Woman"	Pebbles, Volume 1	A cover of a song by The Litter as a bonus track for the 1991 CD re-issue of the 1978 garage compilation album.
1992	"Foggy Notion"	Heaven and Hell Vol.2: a Tribute to the Velvet Underground	A previously unreleased track, with singer Noel Burke.
1998	"Fools Like Us"	Martha, Meet Frank, Daniel and Laurence soundtrack	A previously unreleased track.
1998	"Just a Touch Away"	Dark City soundtrack	
2005	"The Cutter"	Just Say Sire: The Sire Records Story	The music video of the 1983 single.
2006	"Lips Like Sugar [Way Out West Remix Edit]"	Future Retro	A previously unreleased mix of the 1987 single.

== Extended plays ==
Title	EP details	Peak chart positions			Notes
Title	EP details	UK	IRE	NZ	Notes
Shine So Hard	Released: 10 April 1981; Label: Korova (#ECHO 1); Formats: 12-inch vinyl, cassette	37	—	26	
The Sound of Echo	Released: February 1984; Label: Korova (#9239871); Format: 12-inch vinyl	—	—	—	Also known as The Echo and the Bunnymen EP and The Never Stop EP.
Life at Brian's – Lean and Hungry	Released: 6 July 1984; Label: Korova (#KOW 35F); Format: Double 7-inch vinyl	16	10	—	Numbered limited edition of the "Seven Seas" single.
The Peel Sessions	Released: 1988; Label: Strange Fruit Records (#SFPS060); Formats: 12-inch vinyl, cassette, CD	—	—	—	
New Live and Rare	Released: 1988; Label: WEA (#22P2-2155); Format: CD	—	—	—	
World Tour E.P.	Released: 1997; Label: PolyGram (#POCD1270); Format: CD	—	—	—	
Avalanche	Released: October 2000; Label: Gimme Music (#ECHO1); Format: CD	—	—	—	
Live from Glasgow	Released: 12 October 2009; Label: Ocean Rain; Format: Download	—	—	—	
"—" denotes releases that did not chart.

== Singles ==
Year	Single	Peak chart positions						Certifications	Album
Year	Single	UK	US Alt.	CAN Alt.	IRE	NZ	AUS	Certifications	Album
1979	"The Pictures on My Wall"	—	—	—	—	—	—		Crocodiles
1980	"Rescue"	62	—	—	—	—	—		Crocodiles
1980	"The Puppet"	—	—	—	—	—	—		Non-album single
1981	"Crocodiles"	37	—	—	—	—	—		Crocodiles
1981	"A Promise"	49	—	—	—	—	—		Heaven Up Here
1981	"Over the Wall"	—	—	—	—	—	—		Heaven Up Here
1982	"The Back of Love"	19	—	—	24	—	—		Porcupine
1982	"Fuel"	—	—	—	—	—	—		Porcupine
1983	"The Cutter"	8	—	—	10	30	67		Porcupine
1983	"Never Stop"	15	—	—	8	49	—		Non-album single
1984	"The Killing Moon"	9	—	—	7	12	96	BPI: Gold	Ocean Rain
1984	"Silver"	30	—	—	14	—	—		Ocean Rain
1984	"Seven Seas"	16	—	—	10	—	—		Ocean Rain
1985	"Bring On the Dancing Horses"	21	—	—	15	31	78		Songs to Learn & Sing
1987	"The Game"	28	—	—	—	—	—		Echo & the Bunnymen
1987	"Lips Like Sugar"	36	—	—	24	43	—		Echo & the Bunnymen
1987	"Bedbugs and Ballyhoo"	—	—	—	—	—	—		Echo & the Bunnymen
1988	"People Are Strange"	29	—	—	13 (Note: Chart position for the 1991 reissue; the 1987 chart position was No. 21.)	—	—		The Lost Boys soundtrack
1990	"Enlighten Me"	96	8	—	—	—	—		Reverberation
1991	"Prove Me Wrong"	—	—	—	—	—	—		Non-album single
1992	"Inside Me, Inside You"	—	—	—	—	—	—		Non-album single
1997	"Nothing Lasts Forever"	8	—	—	—	—	—		Evergreen
1997	"I Want to Be There (When You Come)"	30	26	16	—	—	—		Evergreen
1997	"Don't Let It Get You Down"	50	—	—	—	—	—		Evergreen
1999	"Rust"	22	—	—	—	—	—		What Are You Going to Do with Your Life?
1999	"Get in the Car"	—	—	—	—	—	—		What Are You Going to Do with Your Life?
2001	"It's Alright"	41	—	—	—	—	—		Flowers
2001	"Make Me Shine"	84	—	—	—	—	—		Flowers
2005	"Stormy Weather"	55	—	—	—	—	—		Siberia
2005	"In the Margins"	—	—	—	—	—	—		Siberia
2006	"Scissors in the Sand"	—	—	—	—	—	—		Siberia
2009	"Think I Need It Too"	—	—	—	—	—	—		The Fountain
2014	"Lovers On the Run"	—	—	—	—	—	—		Meteorites
2018	"Seven Seas (Transformed)"	—	—	—	—	—	—		The Stars, The Ocean & The Moon
2026	"Brussels is Haunted"	—	—	—	—	—	—		Apples for Isaac

=== Other singles appearances ===
Year	Song	Single	Notes
1990	"What Time Is Love? (Echo & The Bunnymen Mix)"	"What Time Is Love? (Remodelled & Remixed)"	A remix of The KLF single by Echo & the Bunnymen.
1998	"(How Does It Feel to Be) On Top of the World"	"(How Does It Feel To Be) On Top of the World"	England's official 1998 World Cup song by England United (Echo & the Bunnymen, Ocean Colour Scene, Space, and the Spice Girls).

== Video albums ==
Title	Album details	Notes
Shine So Hard	Released: 1982; Label: Atlas Adventures; Format: VHS	Released in a limited edition of 500.
Porcupine – An Atlas Adventure	Released: 1983; Label: Castle Hendring (#HEN2 001); Format: VHS	
Pictures on My Wall	Released: 1985; Label: Warner Music Vision; Format: VHS	Re-released 14 September 1998
Live in Liverpool	Released: 24 September 2002; Label: Cooking Vinyl (#COOKDVD001); Format: DVD	
Dancing Horses	Released: 23 April 2007; Label: Pinnacle Vision (#SMADVD257X); Format: DVD	

=== Other video album appearances ===
Year	Song	Video	Notes
1981	"The Puppet"	Urgh! A Music War	Recorded at the Lyceum Ballroom, London on 7 September 1980.
2004	"Lips Like Sugar"	F.I.B. Heineken 2003	Recorded at the 2003 Benicàssim International Festival.
2004	"Nothing Lasts Forever"	Later... with Jools Holland – Cool Britannia	Recorded for the BBC Television programme Later... with Jools Holland.
2004	"Lips Like Sugar"	Essential Music Videos: '80s UK	The promotional music video released in 1987.
2004	"The Killing Moon"	Donnie Darko	An easter egg on the region 2 Metrodome version of the DVD. Performance is from the 2002 DVD Live in Liverpool.
2005	"Seven Seas"	The Work of Director Anton Corbijn	The promotional music video released in 1984.

== Music videos ==
Year	Title	Director
1983	"The Back of Love"	Bill Butt
1983	"In Bluer Skies"	Bill Butt
1983	"The Cutter"	Bill Butt
1983	"My White Devil"	Bill Butt
1983	"Porcupine"	Bill Butt
1983	"Heads Will Roll"	Bill Butt
1983	"Higher Hell"	Anton Corbijn
1984	"The Killing Moon"	Brian Griffin
1984	"Seven Seas"	Anton Corbijn
1985	"Bring on the Dancing Horses"	Anton Corbijn
1987	"Bedbugs and Ballyhoo"	Anton Corbijn
1987	"The Game"	Anton Corbijn
1987	"Lips Like Sugar"	Anton Corbijn
1987	"People Are Strange"	Joel Schumacher; Anton Corbijn
1990	"Enlighten Me"	
1997	"I Want to Be There (When You Come)"	Norman Watson
1997	"Nothing Lasts Forever"	Norman Watson
1999	"Rust"	The Douglas Brothers
2001	"It's Alright"	Gavin Gordon-Rogers
2001	"Make Me Shine"	Hambi Haralambous
2005	"Stormy Weather"	
2005	"In the Margins"	
2014	"Lovers On the Run"	Roger Sargent
