= Songs to Learn & Sing =

1985 compilation album by Echo & the Bunnymen

Greatest hits album by Echo & the Bunnymen
- Released: 11 November 1985
- Recorded: 1979–1985
- Genres: Post-punk, new wave
- Length: 40:09
- Label: Korova
- Producers: Ian Broudie, the Chameleons, Hugh Jones, Echo & the Bunnymen, Laurie Latham

Echo & the Bunnymen chronology
Ocean Rain (1984)	Songs to Learn & Sing (1985)	Echo & the Bunnymen (1987)

Singles from Songs to Learn & Sing
- 1. "Bring On the Dancing Horses" Released: 7 October 1985

Professional ratings
Review scores
Source	Rating
AllMusic	link
Robert Christgau	C+

Songs to Learn & Sing is a compilation album by the English rock band Echo & the Bunnymen, released on 11 November 1985 by Korova. Featuring all of the singles the band had released up to that point, the album received positive reviews and reached number six on the UK Albums Chart.

== Releases ==
Songs to Learn & Sing was first released as an LP, a cassette and a CD by Korova in the United Kingdom, WEA in Germany and Sire Records in the United States on 15 November 1985. The album was also available as a limited edition picture disc and a limited edition album with a copy of the "Pictures on My Wall" single.

The album includes songs in chronological order taken from the band's four studio albums that had been released up to that point, as well as the previously unreleased "Bring On the Dancing Horses", slated for the John Hughes film Pretty in Pink (1986). It also includes the non-album singles "The Puppet" and "Never Stop". "Bring On the Dancing Horses" was released as a single on 14 November 1985. It reached number 21 on the UK singles chart and number 15 on the Irish Singles Chart.

== Reception ==
MacKenzie Wilson of AllMusic rated Songs to Learn & Sing four and a half stars out of five and described it as "a solid and comprehensive collection of the band's material". The album reached number 6 on the UK Albums Chart and number 158 on the US Billboard 200. In 1993, it was featured in Rock Compact Disc magazine's list of 45 classic "British Indie Guitar Rock" albums.

== Track listing ==
All words by Ian McCulloch. All music composed by McCulloch, Will Sergeant, Les Pattinson and Pete de Freitas.

Side one
No.	Title	Original release	Length
1.	"Rescue"	Crocodiles (1980)	3:46
2.	"The Puppet"	Non-album single (1980)	3:05
3.	"Do It Clean"	Crocodiles (US version)	2:43
4.	"A Promise"	Heaven Up Here (1981)	3:40
5.	"The Back of Love"	Porcupine (1983)	3:13
6.	"The Cutter"	Porcupine	3:55

Side two
No.	Title	Original release	Length
1.	"Never Stop"	Non-album single (1983)	3:29
2.	"The Killing Moon"	Ocean Rain (1984)	5:46
3.	"Silver"	Ocean Rain	3:17
4.	"Seven Seas"	Ocean Rain	3:19
5.	"Bring On the Dancing Horses"	Previously unreleased	3:56

== Personnel ==
Echo & the Bunnymen

- Will Sergeant – guitar
- Ian McCulloch – vocals
- Les Pattinson – basses
- Pete de Freitas – drums
- The Bunnymen – all other instruments

Technical

- Ian Broudie – producer ("Rescue", "The Back of Love", "The Cutter")
- The Chameleons (David Balfe and Bill Drummond) – producers ("The Puppet", "Do It Clean")
- Hugh Jones – producer ("A Promise", "Never Stop")
- The Bunnymen – producers ("The Killing Moon", "Silver", "Seven Seas"); associate producers ("A Promise", "Never Stop")
- David Lord – engineer ("The Killing Moon")
- Laurie Latham – producer ("Bring On the Dancing Horses")
- Anton Corbijn – photography
- X=X – design

== Release history ==
Region	Date	Label	Format	Catalogue number
United Kingdom	11 November 1985	Korova	LP	KODE 13
United Kingdom	11 November 1985	Korova	LP picture disc	KODE 13P
United Kingdom	11 November 1985	Korova	Cassette	CODE 13
Germany	15 November 1985	WEA	LP	240,767-1
Germany	15 November 1985	WEA	CD	2292-40767-2
United States	15 November 1985	Sire Records	LP	1-25360
United States	15 November 1985	Sire Records	CD	25360-2

== Charts ==
Chart (1985–1986)	Peak position
Australian Albums (Kent Music Report)	57
New Zealand Albums (RMNZ)	25
UK Albums (Official Charts)	6
US Billboard 200	158

Chart (2022–2025)	Peak position
Croatian International Albums (HDU)	14
Scottish Albums (Official Charts)	10

== Certifications ==
Region	Certification	Certified units/sales
United Kingdom (BPI)	Gold	100,000^{^}
^{^} Shipments figures based on certification alone.
