= The Sound of Echo =

1984 EP by Echo & the Bunnymen

EP by Echo & the Bunnymen
- Released: February 1984
- Genre: Post-punk
- Length: 21:53
- Label: US: Sire (1-23987); Canada: Korova (9239871); Japan: WEA (P-6195); Australia/New Zealand: Sire (23987-1)
- Producer: Bill Drummond, David Balfe, Hugh Jones, Ian Broudie

Echo & the Bunnymen chronology
The Killing Moon (1984)	The Sound of Echo (1984)	Silver (1984)

Professional ratings
Review scores
Source	Rating
Allmusic	2.5/5 stars
Robert Christgau	B+

The Sound of Echo is an EP that was released by the band Echo & the Bunnymen in February 1984. The EP is also known as the Never Stop EP and the Echo and the Bunnymen EP. The EP takes tracks from their 1980 Crocodiles album, their 1983 Porcupine album and adds a non-album single and a live track. The EP was released on 12-inch vinyl. The live track, "Do It Clean", was recorded at the Royal Albert Hall on 18 July 1983.

== Track listings ==
All tracks written by Will Sergeant, Ian McCulloch, Les Pattinson and Pete de Freitas.

1. "Never Stop" – 4:44
2. "Rescue" – 4:30
3. "The Cutter" – 3:55
4. "The Back of Love" – 3:12
5. "Do It Clean" (live) – 6:36

== Personnel ==
=== Musicians ===
- Ian McCulloch – vocals, guitar
- Will Sergeant – lead guitar
- Les Pattinson – bass
- Pete de Freitas – drums

=== Production ===
- Bill Drummond – producer
- David Balfe – producer
- Hugh Jones – producer
- Ian Broudie – producer
- Martyn Atkins – sleeve design
