= The Peel Sessions (Echo & the Bunnymen EP) =

1988 EP by Echo & the Bunnymen

EP by Echo & the Bunnymen
- Released: 1988
- Recorded: 15 August 1979 at Maida Vale Studios, London
- Genre: Post-punk
- Length: 12:30
- Label: Strange Fruit
- Producer: Trevor Dann

Echo & the Bunnymen chronology
People Are Strange (1987)	The Peel Sessions (1988)	New Live and Rare (1988)

Alternative cover
- 1995 re-release cover

The Peel Sessions is an EP that was released in 1988 of music recorded by Echo & the Bunnymen for a John Peel radio show in 1979. The tracks on the EP were recorded in studio number four at BBC Radio's Maida Vale Studios on 15 August 1979 and they were first transmitted on The John Peel Show on BBC Radio 1 on 22 August 1979. The EP reached number seven on the UK Indie Chart.

Recorded prior to Pete de Freitas joining the band, the percussion on the tracks was done by David Balfe, who co-produced the band's first single, "The Pictures on My Wall".

The EP was re-released in 1995 with a new cover.

== Track listings ==
All tracks written by Will Sergeant, Ian McCulloch and Les Pattinson except where noted.

1. "Read It in Books" (McCulloch, Julian Cope) – 2:25
2. "Stars Are Stars" – 3:05
3. "I Bagsy Yours" – 2:50
4. "Villiers Terrace" – 4:10

== Personnel ==
=== Musicians ===
- Ian McCulloch – vocals, guitar
- Will Sergeant – guitar
- Les Pattinson – bass guitar
- David Balfe – percussion, keyboards

=== Production ===
- Trevor Dann – producer
- Bob Jones – cutting engineer
