= The Puppet =

1980 single by Echo & the Bunnymen

Single by Echo & the Bunnymen
- B-side: "Do It Clean"
- Released: 3 October 1980
- Studio: Rockfield Studios, Monmouth, Wales
- Genre: Post-punk
- Label: Korova (UK) Sire (US)
- Songwriters: Will Sergeant, Ian McCulloch, Les Pattinson, Pete de Freitas
- Producers: Bill Drummond, David Balfe

Echo & the Bunnymen singles chronology
"Rescue" (1980)	"The Puppet" (1980)	"'Shine So Hard'" (1981)

"The Puppet" is the third single by the band Echo & the Bunnymen and was released on 3 October 1980.

The single was released in the wake of the critical acclaim received for the band's first album, Crocodiles, which had been released earlier in the year. The main track itself was not on the album but the b-side, "Do It Clean", was on the US release of the album and the Compact Cassette version of the UK release. The single failed to make the UK Singles Chart. The single was produced by Bill Drummond and David Balfe although they were credited as The Chameleons.

== B-side ==
The b-side, "Do It Clean", has become a popular track with both the band and the fans. It is regularly played live and has appeared as the b-side to the Belgian version of their fourth single "A Promise" (1981) and to their 1984 hit single, "The Killing Moon". It has also appeared on many of the band's compilation albums.

== Track listings ==
All Tracks written by Will Sergeant, Ian McCulloch, Les Pattinson and Pete de Freitas.

UK release (KOW 11)

1. "The Puppet"
2. "Do It Clean"
