= Shine So Hard =

1981 live EP by Echo & the Bunnymen

EP by Echo & the Bunnymen
- Released: 10 April 1981
- Recorded: 17 January 1981
- Venue: Pavilion Gardens, Buxton
- Studio: The Manor Mobile
- Genre: Post-punk
- Length: 16:59
- Label: Korova / WEA
- Producer: Bill Drummond, Hugh Jones

Echo & the Bunnymen chronology
The Puppet (1980)	Shine So Hard (1981)	A Promise (1981)

Professional ratings
Review scores
Source	Rating
Allmusic	2/5 stars

Shine So Hard is a live 12" EP released by the band Echo & the Bunnymen on 10 April 1981. The EP reached number 37 on the UK Singles Chart.

== Overview ==
Having returned from Europe where they were promoting their debut album Crocodiles, Echo & the Bunnymen went on to tour the United Kingdom. The final concert of the "Camo" tour was held at the Pavilion Gardens in Buxton, Derbyshire on 17 January 1981, and the performance was filmed, with multitrack audio recorded by the Manor Mobile.

The concert, staged as a special free event for fans, was devised by manager Bill Drummond and their lighting director Bill Butt. They intended it as a source of footage for the group's first music video, as well as a way to document the Bunnymen's dynamic live performances in this period. After placing advertisements in the music press, 500 respondents were sent free tickets and a map to the secret venue (called "Gomorrah" in the ad), and for a £5 fee, coach transport was arranged for fans coming from London, Liverpool and other cities.

Butt planned to direct the film himself, but discovered that UK film union rules would prevent it from being distributed commercially unless it was made by a properly accredited director. On the advice of mutual friend Peter Duval, Butt hired John Smith to direct. Smith and Duval were friends from their university days, and Smith had gained director's guild accreditation for a student film he had made a few years earlier.

Duval was engaged as editor and he and Smith were given total creative freedom. They spent a week in Buxton with the band leading up to the concert, filming them in various locations, and with the addition of an extra camera operator they then filmed the concert.

The finished product, also titled "Shine So Hard", was a 32-minute short film that combined Smith and Duval's avant-garde opening montage (a series of oblique images of the band engaged in various activities leading up to the concert) with footage of four songs from the concert, "Crocodiles", "Zimbo", "All That Jazz" and "Over the Wall".

The audio was mixed at Rockfield Studios in Monmouth, Wales. The EP was released on 10 April 1981 and subsequently peaked at number 37 on the UK Singles Chart, becoming the band's first hit single.

The title of the EP comes from a line in an earlier Bunnymen song, "Stars Are Stars".

The film was given a limited cinema release in the UK during 1981. A limited edition of 500 32-minute videos filmed by Bill Butt were subsequently released in 1982 of the Buxton concert. These were made available only to people who had been present at the concert.

When Crocodiles was remastered and reissued in 2003, the four tracks from the EP were included as bonus tracks.

== Track listings ==
All tracks written by Will Sergeant, Ian McCulloch, Les Pattinson and Pete de Freitas.

UK release (ECHO 1)

1. "Crocodiles" (live) – 5:06
2. "Zimbo" (live) – 3:32
3. "All That Jazz" (live) – 2:52
4. "Over the Wall" (live) – 5:29

New Zealand release (MX 214362)

1. "Crocodiles" (live) – 5:06
2. "All That Jazz" (live) – 2:52
3. "Zimbo" (live) – 3:32
4. "Over the Wall" (live) – 5:29

== Personnel ==
=== Musicians ===
- Ian McCulloch – vocals, guitar
- Will Sergeant – lead guitar
- Les Pattinson – bass
- Pete de Freitas – drums

=== Production ===
- Bill Drummond – producer
- Hugh Jones – producer
- Martyn Atkins – sleeve design
