= BBC Radio 1 Live in Concert (Echo & the Bunnymen album) =

1992 album by Echo & the Bunnymen

Live album by Echo & the Bunnymen
- Released: 18 September 1992
- Recorded: 11 January 1988, Liverpool Empire Theatre
- Genre: Post-punk
- Label: Windsong International

Echo & the Bunnymen chronology
Reverberation (1990)	BBC Radio 1 Live in Concert (1992)	The Cutter (1993)

Professional ratings
Review scores
Source	Rating
Allmusic	3/5 stars

BBC Radio 1 Live in Concert is a 1992 live album by Echo & the Bunnymen. It was recorded by the BBC during the band's concert at the Liverpool Empire Theatre on 11 January 1988 and broadcast on BBC Radio 1's In Concert programme.

== Track listing ==
1. "Rescue" – 3.52
2. "Heaven Up Here" – 3.25
3. "With a Hip" – 2.43
4. "Bombers Bay" – 4.27
5. "All I Want" – 3.50
6. "Back of Love" – 3.00
7. "Crocodiles" – 4.02
8. "Zimbo" – 4.02
9. "Seven Seas" – 2.49
10. "Bedbugs and Ballyhoo" – 2.51
11. "The Cutter" – 3.30
12. "Show of Strength" – 4.22
13. "Lips Like Sugar" – 5.10
14. "Thorn of Crowns" – 5.26

== Personnel ==
- Ian McCulloch – singer, guitar
- Will Sergeant – guitar
- Les Pattinson – bass guitar
- Pete de Freitas – drums
