= New Live and Rare =

1988 compilation EP by Echo & the Bunnymen

EP by Echo & the Bunnymen
- Released: 1988
- Genre: Post-punk
- Length: 40:58
- Label: WEA
- Producers: Ray Manzarek, David Lord, The Bunnymen, Lars Aldman

Echo & the Bunnymen chronology
The Peel Sessions (1988)	New Live and Rare (1988)	Enlighten Me (1990)

Professional ratings
Review scores
Source	Rating
Allmusic	3/5 stars

New Live and Rare is a compilation EP that was released in 1988 of songs recorded by Echo & the Bunnymen. The EP was released on CD by WEA in Japan.

The EP brings together the songs "People Are Strange" from the soundtrack to the film The Lost Boys, "The Killing Moon (All Night Version)" from the extended 12-inch single and live versions of "All You Need Is Love", "Paint It Black", "Run, Run, Run", "Friction" and "Do It Clean". "All You Need Is Love" was recorded for a Channel 4 programme called Play at Home; "Paint It Black", "Run, Run, Run" and "Friction" were recorded on 25 April 1985 at the Karen in Gothenburg, Sweden for the Bommen radio show on Swedish National Radio. Sleeve incorrectly states "Do It Clean" was recorded live at the Royal Albert Hall, London July 18, 1983 but this track was recorded at the "Karen" in Gothenburg, on 25 April 1985 with the other live tracks.

== Track listings ==
1. "People Are Strange" (The Doors) – 3:39
2. "The Killing Moon (All Night Version)" (Will Sergeant, Ian McCulloch, Les Pattinson, Pete de Freitas) – 9:11
3. "All You Need Is Love" (Lennon/McCartney) – 6:44
4. "Paint It Black" (live) (Jagger/Richards) – 3:19
5. "Run, Run, Run" (live) (Lou Reed) – 3:45
6. "Friction" (live) (Tom Verlaine) – 4:41
7. "Do It Clean" (live) (Sergeant, McCulloch, Pattinson, de Freitas) – 9:39

== Personnel ==
=== Musicians ===
- Ian McCulloch – vocals, guitar
- Will Sergeant – guitar
- Les Pattinson – bass guitar
- Pete de Freitas – drums

=== Production ===
- Ray Manzarek – producer ("People Are Strange")
- David Lord – producer ("The Killing Moon (All Night Version)")
- The Bunnymen – producer ("All You Need Is Love")
- Lars Aldman – producer ("Paint It Black", "Run, Run, Run" and "Friction")
- Bill Drummond – mixed by ("Do It Clean")
