= The Pictures on My Wall =

Debut single by Echo & the Bunnymen

Single by Echo & the Bunnymen
- B-side: "Read It in Books"
- Released: 5 May 1979
- Recorded: August Studio, Liverpool
- Genre: Post-punk
- Length: 2.52
- Label: Zoo
- Songwriter(s): Ian McCulloch, Will Sergeant, Les Pattinson
- Producer(s): Bill Drummond, David Balfe

Echo & the Bunnymen singles chronology
"The Pictures on My Wall" (1979)	"Rescue" (1980)

"The Pictures on My Wall"

Song by Echo & the Bunnymen

from the album Crocodiles
- Released: 18 July 1980
- Studio: Eden Studios, London; Rockfield Studios, Monmouth, Monmouthshire, Wales 1980
- Genre: Post-punk
- Length: 2.56
- Label: Korova
- Songwriter(s): Ian McCulloch, Will Sergeant, Les Pattinson
- Producer(s): Bill Drummond, David Balfe, Ian Broudie

"The Pictures on My Wall" is the first single released by English rock band Echo & the Bunnymen and was released on 5 May 1979 in a limited issue of 4,000 copies. The single reached number twenty-four on the UK Indie Chart.

== Releases ==
The single appeared as "Pictures on My Wall" on the 1980 album Crocodiles. The single features a drum machine, as Pete de Freitas had not yet joined the band. In 1985 the single was also packaged with a limited edition version of the album Songs to Learn & Sing.

The single was reissued in 1991 on the Document label as a maxi single on 12" (DV3T) and CD (DC3). The single was again reissued in 1995 on CD by Griffin Records (466 1995) with the text "Very first Echo and the Bunnymen single. Previously unavailable on CD" in white lettering on the cover.

== Professional reviews ==
MacKenzie Wilson of AllMusic praised the single observing, "it showcases an early, pre-Pete de Freitas Echo & the Bunnymen that is exuberant in the manner of raw Brit-punk. Ian McCulloch's dark vocals overlay Will Sergeant's simplistic guitar work, and Les Pattinson's typically looping bass adds to the classic punk flavour. The title track and "I've Read It in Books" have a particularly stripped-down sound; both tracks were subsequently revamped for inclusion on the Bunnymen's debut release Crocodiles in 1980. Pictures on My Wall is a definite collector's item for any Bunnymen diehard."

- Allmusic link
- Smash Hits (very favourable)

== Track listings ==
1. "The Pictures on My Wall" (Ian McCulloch, Will Sergeant, Les Pattinson) – 2.52
2. "Read It in Books" (McCulloch, Julian Cope) – 2.59
