= Meteorites (album) =

2014 studio album by Echo & the Bunnymen

Studio album by Echo & the Bunnymen
- Released: 3 June 2014
- Genre: Alternative rock, neo-psychedelia
- Length: 47:47
- Label: 429 Records
- Producer: Youth, Andrea Wright

Echo & the Bunnymen chronology
The Fountain (2009)	Meteorites (2014)	The Stars, the Oceans & the Moon (2018)

Singles from Meteorites
- 1. "Lovers on the Run" Released: 26 May 2014

Meteorites is the twelfth studio album by British band Echo & the Bunnymen. It was released on 3 June 2014 and produced by Youth and Andrea Wright. It was the band's first UK Top 40 album entry since 1999 (peaking at #37).

== Title and artwork ==
Guitarist and lead vocalist Ian McCulloch said in reference to the album's title, "Meteorites' is what Echo and the Bunnymen mean and are meant to be—up there in heaven—untouchable, celestial, beautiful and real. It has changed my life." (The idea is mistaken—meteoroids are in space; meteorites have fallen to the ground.) The album's front cover, designed by Luke Insect, uses a thin-slice image of the Zagami meteorite from Mars. Pictures of other thin-sliced meteorites decorate the LP back cover and CD booklet.

== Reception ==
Professional ratings
Aggregate scores
Source	Rating
Metacritic	61/100
Review scores
Source	Rating
AllMusic	4/5 stars
The Guardian	3/5 stars
Pitchfork	6.0/10
Rolling Stone	3/5 stars

The album mostly received average reviews.

Tim Sendra of Allmusic praised the album, saying, "where their previous effort, Fountain, was a big-sounding, very clean modern rock album that reduced the band to its essential core, this one aspires to more epic heights. Teeming with giant string arrangements, widescreen vocal production, and songs that hark back to the glory days of Ocean Rain, the album is a mysterious, murky, impressively nostalgic affair. With Sergeant providing his typically concise and perfectly complementary guitar lines and Mac digging deep to turn in one of his better vocal performances in a while, the duo give Youth a lot to work with and he spins it into some gauzy magic." concluding "It may be too late to really matter, and they may be doomed to be seen as a nostalgia act, but many of the bands in 2014 that are making neo-psychedelic albums would be well served to check with the Bunnymen to see how to go about things the correct way."

Joe Tangari of Pitchfork criticized the album, claiming "for five albums now, Echo and the Bunnymen have been reduced to a duo of Ian McCulloch and guitarist Will Sergeant. As distinctive as they both are, they miss the rhythmic push they used to get when they had a fully integrated rhythm section with as much creative agency in the band."

Jon Dolan of Rolling Stone observed "on their 12th LP, trademark psychedelic swirls and red-sunset strings sound like they're soundtracking a Western about a gunslinger in a Joy Division T-shirt, as McCulloch moans about doomed romance, decadence ("Grapes Upon the Vine") and emotional dissolution (the Phil Spector-steeped "Is This a Breakdown?"). Producer Youth helps balloon the intensity skyhigh, making McCulloch the Bono of spider-web bangs and black regret." Meanwhile, Record Collector criticized the album, stating,"While it [the album] believes it’s a storm of Ocean Rain-esque majesty, Meteorites fizzles out like it’s just another shower."

Cody Ray Shafer of Under The Radar gave a positive review on the album, stating "Meteorites is definitely their best work since 1987’s self-titled album, and it explores the cavernous expanse of dramatic, orchestrated pop they cultivated on the earlier album." but noted there was "not much here that we haven’t really heard before. For Bunnymen fans, Meteorites will be a welcome return to form. But they sound like a band immune to the musical climate around them. Instead of moving forward, Meteorites just takes them back. Back to when they were good, sure, but sometimes that’s not enough."

Rhian Daly of NME gave 3 out of 5 stars, saying the "band may be open and unguarded on their 12th record but they can't match their previous highs [...] for a band formerly as bombastic as Echo And The Bunnymen, it’s sad that their 12th album, and first in five years, begins with a whimper. The title track opener takes a few minutes to reach its Verve-esque chorus, and even when it does, Ian McCulloch’s normally peerless voice is drowned by strings, guitars and backing vocals. It’s not all bad, though: ‘Lovers On The Run’ is vintage Bunnymen, with Big Mac crooning semi-cryptically about “rising tides” and “baying suns” over a riff borrowed from ‘The Killing Moon’" and concluded, "as a whole, ‘Meteorites’ fails to set the sky on fire."

== Track listing ==
All tracks written by Ian McCulloch, except where noted.

1. "Meteorites" (Martin Glover, Ian McCulloch) (5:12)
2. "Holy Moses" (3:43)
3. "Constantinople" (4:55)
4. "Is This a Breakdown?" (3:56)
5. "Grapes Upon the Vine" (3:37)
6. "Lovers On the Run" (Glover, McCulloch) (4:46)
7. "Burn It Down" (3:57)
8. "Explosions" (Glover, McCulloch) (4:37)
9. "Market Town" (7:38)
10. "New Horizons" (5:26)

== Personnel ==
Echo & the Bunnymen

- Ian McCulloch—vocals, guitar, bass guitar, percussion, arrangements
- Will Sergeant—guitar, arrangements, percussion

Additional personnel

- Youth—bass guitar, production, mixing
- Eddie Banda, Jamie Grashion, Tom Grashion—additional engineering
- David Bianchi, Nick Ember—management
- Michael Rendall—mastering, mixing, recording, programming
- Andrea Wright—additional production, recording, programming
- Luke Insect—design

== Charts ==
Chart (2014)	Peak position
Belgian Albums (Ultratop Flanders)	71
Belgian Albums (Ultratop Wallonia)	114
Dutch Albums (Album Top 100)	90
Scottish Albums (OCC)	31
UK Albums (OCC)	37
