= Burned (album) =

Studio album by Electrafixion
- Released: 1995
- Genre: Alternative rock
- Length: 143:31
- Labels: WEA; Korova
- Producers: Mark Stent; Electrafixion

Professional ratings
Review scores
Source	Rating
AllMusic	3/5 stars

Burned is the debut and sole studio album by the alternative rock band Electrafixion, released in 1995. It reached No. 38 on the UK Albums Chart in October of that year.

== Different releases ==
Burned was originally released in 1995 on CD with eleven tracks.

In 2007, the album was reissued in the UK by Korova Records in remastered in expanded form, with the four tracks from the Zephyr EP and a remixed version of "Never" on the first CD. A second CD was included containing B-sides and live recordings from their Shepherd's Bush Empire concert on 22 October 1995. As of April 2024 Burned was released for the first time on Vinyl on the RSD 2024 in the USA & Europe from Spacejunk, Warner Music UK Ltd. on Black and White Swirl Vinyl containing the eleven original tracks of the 1995 release.

== Singles/EPs ==
The tracks on the album which have been released as singles are "Lowdown", "Never" and "Sister Pain". An EP titled Zephyr was released which included the tracks "Zephyr", "Burned" and "Mirrorball". "Rain on Me" from the Zephyr EP was not included on the CD until the 2007 reissue.

== Track listing ==
All tracks written by Ian McCulloch and Will Sergeant except where noted.

=== Disc one ===
1. "Feel My Pulse" – 4:23
2. "Sister Pain" – 4:15
3. "Lowdown" (McCulloch, Sergeant, Johnny Marr) – 4:35
4. "Timebomb" – 4:38
5. "Zephyr" – 4:12
6. "Never" – 4:46
7. "Too Far Gone" (McCulloch, Sergeant, Johnny Marr) – 4:48
8. "Mirrorball" – 3:56
9. "Who's Been Sleeping in My Head" – 4:00
10. "Hit by Something" – 3:28
11. "Bed of Nails" – 3:51
12. "Zephyr" – 4:54
13. "Burned" – 5:45
14. "Mirrorball" – 4:05
15. "Rain on Me" – 5:35
16. "Never" (Utah Saints 'Blizzard On' Mix) – 6:36

=== Disc two ===
1. "Holy Grail" – 7:07
2. "Land of the Dying Sun" – 5:28
3. "Razor's Edge" – 4:15
4. "Not of This World" – 3:38
5. "Subway Train" – 3:00
6. "Work It on Out" – 4:25
7. "Zephyr" (live) – 4:31
8. "Feel My Pluse" (live) – 3:56
9. "Sister Pain" (live) – 4:01
10. "Lowdown" (live) (McCulloch, Sergeant, Marr) – 4:32
11. "Never" (live) – 5:38
12. "Holy Grail" (live) – 5:40
13. "Too Far Gone" (live) (McCulloch, Sergeant, Marr) – 4:48
14. "Burned" (live) – 4:44
15. "Loose" (live) (The Stooges) – 4:01

== Personnel ==
- Producers:
  - Electrafixion
  - Mark Stent
- Musicians:
  - Ian McCulloch – vocals, guitar
  - Will Sergeant – guitar
  - Leon de Sylva – bass
  - Tony McGuigan – drums
  - Julian Phillips – bass on live tracks
  - George Phillips – drums on live tracks
