= Rescue (Echo & the Bunnymen song) =

1980 single

- 7" single cover

Single by Echo & the Bunnymen

from the album Crocodiles
- B-side: "Simple Stuff" / "Pride"
- Released: 5 May 1980
- Genre: Post-punk
- Label: Korova
- Songwriters: Will Sergeant, Ian McCulloch, Les Pattinson, Pete de Freitas
- Producers: Ian Broudie, The Bunnymen

Echo & the Bunnymen singles chronology
"The Pictures on My Wall" (1979)	"Rescue" (1980)	"The Puppet" (1980)

Alternative cover
- 12" single cover

"Rescue" is the second single released by the band Echo & the Bunnymen. It was released on 5 May 1980 and subsequently included on the Crocodiles album, which was released on 18 July 1980. It was the band's first single to chart, reaching number 62 on the UK Singles Chart. It was also their first release on the newly formed Korova label.

On the single's release, Smash Hits described it as "attractive left field pop" that had "sparse guitaring reminiscent of early Cure and plenty of deadpan melodic bite".

The single was reissued as a limited edition 7" single on 4 December 2006 on the same label and with the same catalogue number, KOW 1, and reached number 177 on the UK Singles Chart. A promo 7" version was also released by Korova in January 1983.

The song was covered by the Scottish rock group Idlewild on the B-side of their 2000 single "These Wooden Ideas," and by the American band Rogue Wave on the 2016 album of 80s covers, Cover Me.

== Formats and track listings ==
All tracks written by Will Sergeant, Ian McCulloch, Les Pattinson and Pete de Freitas.

1980 and 2006 7" single (KOW 1)

1. "Rescue"
2. "Simple Stuff"

1980 12" single (KOW 1T)

1. "Rescue"
2. "Simple Stuff"
3. "Pride"

1983 7" promo single (SAM271)

1. "Rescue"
2. "Never Stop"
3. "The Cutter"

== Chart positions ==
Chart	Peak position
UK Singles Chart (1980)	62
UK Singles Chart (2006)	177
