= Airhead (band) =

English indie rock band

- Also known as: Jefferson Airhead
- Origin: Maidstone, Kent, England
- Genres: Indie rock, pop, pop-rock
- Years active: 1991–1993, 1996
- Labels: Korova; Mother Tongue
- Past members: Michael Wallis; Steve Marshall; Sam Kesteven; Ben Kesteven; Ian Groves; Richard Merrett; Roger Wells; Andy Carr
- Website: http://www.myspace.com/airheaduk

Airhead (formerly Jefferson Airhead) were an English indie rock band that achieved some success in the early 1990s, at the tail end of the Madchester music movement.

Forced to change their name from Jefferson Airhead due to its (deliberate) similarity to Jefferson Airplane, Maidstone-based band Airhead achieved minor UK Singles Chart success with singles "Funny How" and "Counting Sheep". After releasing one album and a handful of singles, they were dropped by their record label Korova and released their final record, the That's Enough EP on Mother Tongue. They are probably best remembered for "Funny How", which although not their highest-charting single was played heavily on BBC Radio 1 at the time of its release. It was also used as the introductory music on the BBC football show Match of the Day.

In 1996, Airhead made a brief return to the live scene, when they supported Kula Shaker, at the Tunbridge Wells Forum.

== Discography ==
=== Album ===
- Boing!! (20 January 1992) UK No. 29

=== Singles ===
- "Congratulations" (as Jefferson Airhead, 1991), B-side "Something Blue"
- "Scrap Happy" (as Jefferson Airhead, 1991)
- "Funny How" (October 1991) UK No. 57, B-side "Keep the Apple"
- "Counting Sheep" (December 1991) UK No. 35, B-side "Take My Train"
- "Right Now" (March 1992) UK No. 50, other tracks "The Enemy" & "Through my Window"
- That's Enough EP (1993), other tracks "They Don't Know" and "Someone Should Have Told Me "

A number of single B-sides did not appear on the band's only album; these were "Something Blue", "The Enemy", "Through My Window", "Keep the Apple", "Take My Train", 'demo' versions of "Congratulations", "Scrap Happy", "Counting Sheep" and "Right Now", and all of the tracks on the That's Enough EP.
