= Bill Butt =

British filmmaker

Bill Butt is a British filmmaker, artist/designer, television director, writer and producer. Butt produced the Eyewitness television series for its first season and has directed music videos and designed album covers.

== History ==
Butt was lighting engineer for Echo & the Bunnymen, a Liverpool band managed by Bill Drummond. In 1981 Butt filmed the band's "Shine So Hard" performance, and in 1982 he was chosen to direct the videos for the Bunnymen's album Porcupine.

Butt worked with Drummond again, filming "The Manager" (released on CD in 1987), and with Drummond's band The KLF, being credited as the director of their films, Waiting and the unfinished road movie The White Room.

Butt produced the Eyewitness television series for its first season.
