= Crocodiles (album) =

1980 debut album by Echo & the Bunnymen

Studio album by Echo & the Bunnymen
- Released: 18 July 1980
- Recorded: 1980
- Studio: Eden (London); Rockfield (Rockfield, Wales)
- Genre: Post-punk; neo-psychedelia; new wave
- Length: 32:31
- Label: Korova
- Producer: Bill Drummond; David Balfe; Ian Broudie

Echo & the Bunnymen chronology
Crocodiles (1980)	Heaven Up Here (1981)

Singles from Crocodiles
- 1. "The Pictures on My Wall" Released: 5 May 1979; 2. "Rescue" Released: 5 May 1980

Crocodiles is the debut album by the English post-punk band Echo & the Bunnymen. It was released on 18 July 1980 in the United Kingdom and on 17 December 1980 in the United States. The album reached number 17 on the UK Albums Chart. "Pictures on My Wall" and "Rescue" had previously been released as singles.

Recorded at Eden Studios in London and at Rockfield Studios near Monmouth, Crocodiles was produced by Bill Drummond and David Balfe, while Ian Broudie had already produced the single "Rescue". The album received favourable reviews from the music press, receiving four out of five stars by both Rolling Stone and Blender magazines.

== Background and recording ==
Echo & the Bunnymen formed in 1978 and originally consisted of Ian McCulloch (vocals and rhythm guitar), Will Sergeant (lead guitar), Les Pattinson (bass) and a drum machine. They released their debut single, "The Pictures on My Wall", in May 1979 on the independent label Zoo Records. The band then signed with WEA subsidiary label Korova and were persuaded to employ a drummer. Pete de Freitas subsequently joined the band, and in early 1980 they recorded their second single, "Rescue". The single was recorded at Eden Studios in London and produced by fellow Liverpudlian and ex-member of Big in Japan Ian Broudie.

A British tour followed in June 1980 before the band went to Rockfield Studios to record their debut album. Despite talk of the American singer Del Shannon being asked to produce the album, it was produced by the band's manager Bill Drummond and his business partner and The Teardrop Explodes keyboard player David Balfe. The recording of the album only took three weeks, but Pattinson was surprised by the boring nature of the recording process: "There was a lot of hanging about. I didn't get all the 'drop-ins' and 'edits' bit."

== Music and lyrics ==
The music on Crocodiles is generally dark and moody: In 1980, the British music magazine NME described McCulloch's lyrics as "scattered with themes of sorrow, horror, and despair, themes that are reinforced by stormy animal/sexual imagery" and American music magazine Creem described Crocodiles as "a moody, mysterious, fascinating record." In 1981, music journalist David Fricke, writing for Rolling Stone magazine, said, "Instead of dope, McCulloch trips out on his worst fears: isolation, death and emotional bankruptcy."

In his 2005 book Rip It Up and Start Again: Post Punk 1978–1984, British music journalist Simon Reynolds describes the sound of the album as "pared and sparse." He goes on to describe Pattinson's "granite basslines" carrying the melody; Sergeant's guitar playing as "jagged-quartz" and avoiding "anything resembling a solo, apart from the odd flinty peal of lead playing"; de Freitas' drumming as minimal and "surging urgency"; and McCulloch's vocals as having "precocious authority." Reynolds describes the songs as being rooted in "doubt, anguish, despair" while the "tightness and brightness of their sound transmits contradictory sensations of confidence, vigour and euphoria." He also describes how the line "Stars are stars and they shine so hard" from the track "Stars Are Stars" showed how the band felt no embarrassment in their wish to be famous. In 1989 McCulloch told Reynolds how, as a teenager, he felt there was "a big movie camera in the sky." McCulloch described the opening line of the track "Going Up" – "Ain't thou watching my film" – as a terrible line, and he went on to say "It was meant to be tongue in cheek, but that was what spurred me on."

== Cover ==
The cover photograph is one of a series taken by photographer Brian Griffin in the woods near Rickmansworth, Hertfordshire at night. The photos show themes of introspection, despair and confusion. Describing the cover photo, music journalist Chris Salewicz said, "[...] the Bunnymen are placed in poses of histrionic despair in a near-neurotically gothic woodland that evokes memories of elfin glades and fabled Arthurian legends." Creem magazine said, "The cover art suggests four boys dazed and confused in a drugged dream, a surreal where-are-we landscape. The Bunnymen's images are of loneliness, disconnection, a world gone awry."

Originally the band wanted the pictures to include burning stakes, but given the possible KKK connotations, they settled for moody lighting instead. However, McCulloch was pleased with the cover, saying "the cover [...] is better to look at than the Mona Lisa." Sergeant was less happy, saying that he "was pissed off that there was a solo picture of [McCulloch] on the back cover."

In the book The KLF: Chaos, Magic and the Band Who Burned a Million Pounds by John Higgs, Bill Drummond says that he saw the face of "Echo", an imagined giant rabbit, in the cover design.

== Releases ==
The album was originally released as an LP in the United Kingdom on 18 July 1980 by Warner Bros. subsidiary label Korova. Two tracks, "Do It Clean" and "Read It in Books", were included on the cassette but were initially omitted from the LP version of the album because the managing director of Warner Bros., Rob Dickins, mistakenly thought that they contained obscenities. After Dickins realised his error, the tracks were included on the American version of the album, which was released by Sire Records on 17 December 1980. The two tracks were included with the UK release as a limited-edition single. The album was first released on CD in May 1989 by WEA in the UK. It was released on CD in the US by Sire Records the following year. The track listings found on these versions were the same as those of the original LP releases for each country.

Along with Echo & the Bunnymen's first five albums, Crocodiles was remastered and reissued on CD in 2003, marketed as a 25th-anniversary edition ten bonus tracks on the UK version and eight on the American version. The UK version contained the missing tracks "Do It Clean" and "Read It in Books". The other bonus tracks included "Simple Stuff", which was the B-side to the single "Rescue"; early versions of "Villiers Terrace", "Pride" and "Simple Stuff" from the album's recording sessions; and the four tracks from the Shine So Hard EP, "Crocodiles", "Zimbo", "All That Jazz" and "Over the Wall". The reissued album was produced by music historian Andy Zax and producer Bill Inglot.

Two singles were released before the album's release. "Pictures on My Wall" (as "The Pictures on My Wall"), the band's first single, was released on 5 May 1979. The single version was recorded before de Freitas had joined the band, but the song was re-recorded for the album with de Freitas on drums. The band's second single, "Rescue", released on 5 May 1980, became the band's first song to chart when it reached number 62 on the UK Singles Chart.

Scottish band Idlewild covered the track "Rescue" on their single "These Wooden Ideas" in June 2000. In late 2001, American singer-songwriter Kelley Stoltz released the album Crockodials, a track-by-track cover version of the original Crocodiles album.

== Reception and legacy ==
Professional ratings
Review scores
Source	Rating
AllMusic	5/5 stars
Blender	4/5 stars
Entertainment Weekly	A−
The Guardian	4/5 stars
Pitchfork	8.2/10
Record Mirror	5/5 stars
Rolling Stone	4/5 stars
The Rolling Stone Album Guide	3.5/5 stars
Smash Hits	9½/10
The Village Voice	B

Writing for NME in 1980, Chris Salewicz described the album as "being probably the best album this year by a British band." In his review of the album for Smash Hits, Ian Cranna said that the album was "proof positive that there's just no substitute for a good song delivered with power and emotion." Cranna added, "[The band] deliver attractive melodies with dark and moody (but not obscure) personal lyrics, all turned into compulsive listening by a driving beat, ringing guitars and a hauntingly emotional voice." Reviewing the album in 1981 for Rolling Stone magazine, David Fricke awarded it four out of five stars and described McCulloch's vocals: "[He] specializes in a sort of apocalyptic brooding, combining Jim Morrison-style psychosexual yells, a flair for David Bowie-like vocal inflections and the nihilistic bark of his punk peers into a disturbing portrait of the singer as a young neurotic." Fricke went on to say, "Behind him, gripping music swells into Doors-style dirges ('Pictures on My Wall'), PiL-like guitar dynamics ('Monkeys'), spookily evocative pop ('Rescue') and Yardbirds-cum-Elevators ravers jacked up in the New Wave manner ('Do It Clean,' 'Crocodiles')." Reviewing the 2003 remastered version for American music magazine Blender's website, reviewer Andrew Harrison also gave the album four out of five stars and said, "[...] the Bunnymen were a pure nihilistic thrill, with Will Sergeant's desperate, mantra-like guitar summoning up a primal night of blinking hallucinations."

Crocodiles reached number 17 on the UK Albums Chart in July 1980. The album has since sold over 100,000 copies and the band were awarded a gold disc for the album on 5 December 1984 by the British Phonographic Industry. In 1993, the NME listed Crocodiles at number 28 in its list of the 50 greatest albums of the 1980s. In 2006, Uncut magazine listed the album at number 69 on its list of the 100 greatest debut albums. The album was also included in the book 1001 Albums You Must Hear Before You Die. In 2020, Rolling Stone included Crocodiles in their "80 Greatest albums of 1980" list, praising "Will Sergeants’ ice-dagger guitar and Les Pattinson’s spelunking bass, making “Rescue” and “Pictures on My Wall” the perfect invitations to crawl down into Ian’s hot pit of despair." In 2025, Radio X included the album in its list of "The 25 best indie debut albums of the 1980s".

== Track listing ==
All tracks written by Will Sergeant, Ian McCulloch, Les Pattinson and Pete de Freitas except where noted.

=== 1980 UK LP version and Canadian Cassette ===
==== Side one ====
1. "Going Up" – 3:57
2. "Stars Are Stars" – 2:45
3. "Pride" – 2:41
4. "Monkeys" – 2:49
5. "Crocodiles" – 2:38

==== Side two ====
1. "Rescue" – 4:26
2. "Villiers Terrace" – 2:44
3. "Pictures on My Wall" (Sergeant, McCulloch, Pattinson) – 2:52
4. "All That Jazz" – 2:43
5. "Happy Death Men" – 4:56

=== 1980 US version and 1980 UK cassette version ===
==== Side one ====
1. "Going Up" – 3:57
2. "Do It Clean" – 2:44
3. "Stars Are Stars" – 2:45
4. "Pride" – 2:41
5. "Monkeys" – 2:49
6. "Crocodiles" – 2:38

==== Side two ====
1. "Rescue" – 4:26
2. "Villiers Terrace" – 2:44
3. "Read It in Books" (McCulloch, Julian Cope) – 2:31
4. "Pictures on My Wall" (Sergeant, McCulloch, Pattinson) – 2:52
5. "All That Jazz" – 2:43
6. "Happy Death Men" – 4:56

=== 2003 bonus tracks ===
11. "Do It Clean"^{[A]} – 2:44
12. "Read It in Books"^{[A]} (McCulloch, Cope) – 2:31
13. "Simple Stuff" – 2:38
14. "Villiers Terrace" (early version) – 3:08
15. "Pride" (early version) – 2:54
16. "Simple Stuff" (early version) – 2:37
17. "Crocodiles"^{[B]} (live) – 5:09
18. "Zimbo"^{[B]} (live) – 3:36
19. "All That Jazz"^{[B]} (live) – 2:53
20. "Over the Wall"^{[B]} (live) – 5:28

== Personnel ==
Echo & the Bunnymen

- Ian McCulloch – vocals, guitar
- Will Sergeant – lead guitar
- Les Pattinson – bass
- Pete de Freitas – drums

Technical

- Bill Drummond^{[C]} – producer (original album and Shine So Hard tracks)
- David Balfe^{[C]} – producer (original album), keyboards
- Ian Broudie – producer ("Pride" and "Rescue")
- The Bunnymen – producer ("Simple Stuff")
- Pat Moran – producer (early versions)
- Hugh Jones – producer (Shine So Hard tracks), engineer (original album)
- Andy Zax – reissue producer
- Bill Inglot – reissue producer, remastering
- Rod Houison – engineer ("Pride" and "Rescue")
- Gary Edwards – engineer (early versions)
- Dan Hersch – remastering
- Brian Griffin – cover photography
- Bill Butt – insert photography

== Charts ==
Chart (1980)	Peak position
New Zealand Albums (RMNZ)	36
UK Albums (OCC)	17

Chart (2021)	Peak position
Scottish Albums (OCC)	47

== Certifications ==
Region	Certification	Certified units/sales
United Kingdom (BPI)	Gold	100,000^{^}
^{^} Shipments figures based on certification alone.

== Notes ==
- A. ^^{1} ^{2} Originally included on the US release of Crocodiles.
- B. ^^{1} ^{2} ^{3} ^{4} From the Shine So Hard EP (Korona ECHO 1, 1981). Recorded live at the Pavilion Gardens, Buxton, UK, 17 January 1981.
- C. ^^{1} ^{2} Credited as The Chameleons.
