= Electrafixion =

English alternative rock band

- L-R: Tony McGuigan, Ian McCulloch, and Will Sergeant

Background information
- Origin: England, United Kingdom
- Genres: Alternative rock
- Years active: 1994–1996
- Labels: Warner Music; Phree; Sire Records (US); Elektra Records (US)
- Past members: Ian McCulloch; Will Sergeant; Leon de Sylva; Tony McGuigan; Julian Phillips

Electrafixion were an alternative rock band, formed by former Echo & the Bunnymen members Ian McCulloch and Will Sergeant in 1994, joined by bass guitarist Leon de Sylva and drummer Tony McGuigan. They released one album, Burned, and four singles and EPs before splitting up in 1996, due to the reformation of the Bunnymen. A posthumous limited edition 7" single, "Baseball Bill" was released in 1997. When touring, the band included Julian Phillips (formerly of Marion) on bass and his brother, George Phillips, on drums.

== Discography ==
=== Albums ===
- Burned (1995, WEA/Warners, CD/C, 0630 11248-2/-4) UK No. 38 (2 weeks) released 25 September 1995

=== Singles ===
- Zephyr EP (1994, WEA/Warners, 12"/cs/cds, YZ 865 T/C/D) UK No. 47 (2 weeks)
- "Lowdown" (1995, WEA/Warners, 7"/cs/cds, YZ 977 X/C/CD) UK No. 54 (2 weeks)
- "Never" (1995, WEA/Warners, cs/cds/cds, WEA 022C/CD/CDX) UK No. 58 (1 week)
- "Sister Pain" (1996, WEA/Warners, cds/cds/cds, WEA 037 CD1/CD2/CD3) UK No. 27 (1 week)
- "Baseball Bill" (1997, Phree, 7", PHREE 1)

== See also ==
- Electrafixion discography at MusicBrainz
