= Les Pattinson =

English musician (born 1958)

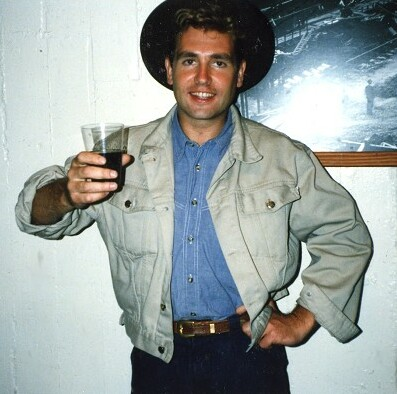
- Les Pattinson in September 1987 - backstage at the Greek Theatre, Berkeley, California

Background information
- Born: Leslie Thomas Pattinson; 18 April 1958 (age 68); Ormskirk, Lancashire, England
- Genres: Post-punk; alternative rock
- Occupation: Musician
- Instrument: Bass guitar
- Years active: 1978–1999; 2009–present
- Labels: Warner Bros.; Sire; Zoo; London

Leslie Thomas Pattinson (born 18 April 1958 in Ormskirk, Lancashire) is an English musician, best known for his work as the bassist and co-writer of the Liverpool-based band Echo & the Bunnymen, along with vocalist Ian McCulloch and guitarist Will Sergeant. He was brought up in Aughton, Lancashire and attended nearby Deyes High School in Maghull, where he and Sergeant were classmates and became friends.

== Career ==
Pattinson met Will Sergeant again in 1977 at Eric's Club in Liverpool. They were both regulars of the Eric's crowd, attending the club several times a week. Pattinson called himself 'Jeff Lovestone' and formed a band called The Jeffs, in which all the members were called 'Jeff'. He later formed another imaginary band called 'The Love Pastels' which consisted of many girls, all on vocals, and himself on vocals and bass. He also read poetry and bent neon lights on stage, going by the name of 'Neon Poet'. The poem 'Sand Man' that later appeared in the song "Over The Wall" came from the 'Neon Poet' era.

During the early days at Eric's, Pattinson and Sergeant had befriended Ian McCulloch, another Eric's regular, who'd been in various bands that had rehearsed but not played gigs. Sergeant and McCulloch began hanging out together, and formed a band called Echo & the Bunnymen. They were offered a spot playing at Eric's alongside another Liverpool-based band that had formed out of the Eric's crowd, called The Teardrop Explodes. Three days before their first show, Pattinson was asked to join Echo & the Bunnymen, despite having never previously played the bass. He'd bought a cheap Grant bass for £40; it had only three strings. He would later replace that with the blue Fender Jazz Bass that he still uses.

Echo & the Bunnymen were now a three-piece band with a drum machine, consisting of Sergeant on guitar, Pattinson on bass, and McCulloch on vocals. They played their debut show on 15 November 1978, at Eric's. Although the gig was short, it was received very enthusiastically. Bill Drummond and David Balfe, of Zoo Records, were in attendance that night and signed the band to the label. They were later signed to Korova, on the major label Sire/WEA. In 1979, Echo & the Bunnymen replaced their drum machine with drummer Pete de Freitas.

Over the next several years Pattinson helped write many of the band's Top 20 hits, such as "The Cutter", "The Back of Love", "Never Stop", "The Killing Moon" and "Seven Seas", and also "Lips Like Sugar", "Bring on the Dancing Horses", and "Silver", which made the Top 40. "The Killing Moon" would appear in the opening credits of the 2001 film Donnie Darko, and would later be used in an Audi commercial to be shown during the 2012 Super Bowl. They recorded a cover of "People Are Strange" by the Doors in 1987, for the soundtrack to the film The Lost Boys. The track was produced by Ray Manzarek, keyboardist of the Doors; he also played keyboards on it. Manzarek would later perform the song live on stage with the Bunnymen in New York during their subsequent tour. He also played the song with the band at The Royal Court Theatre in Liverpool on the same tour.

After five studio albums, McCulloch left The Bunnymen in 1988 to pursue a solo career. The three remaining members decided to continue working under the name 'Echo & the Bunnymen' and brought in ex–St. Vitus Dance vocalist Noel Burke to replace McCulloch. After de Freitas' death in a motorcycle accident in 1989, Pattinson and Sergeant added percussionist Damon Reece (who later joined former Spacemen 3 principal Jason Pierce's new band, Spiritualized, as drummer); and Jake Brockman, keyboardist and long-time friend of the band, to continue with the recording of their album Reverberation, which was released in December 1990. The band later formed their own label called Euphoric Records and released another two singles, and also did several international tours, before disbanding in 1993.

In 1994, Pattinson was approached by Terry Hall, ex-lead singer of The Specials, to play bass on his critically acclaimed debut solo album entitled 'Home'. At the time Pattinson had set up a sandblasting business, and at first thought the call was from someone who wanted their home sandblasted. He played bass for Hall's coinciding European tour. Meanwhile, Sergeant and McCulloch had been working together again under the name Electrafixion. In 1996 they disbanded, and reformed Echo & the Bunnymen. Pattinson agreed to rejoin the band. Together, they co-wrote the Bunnymen's seventh studio album, Evergreen. Released in July 1997, the album was greeted enthusiastically by both the public and critics, and reached number 8 in the UK charts. The single "Nothing Lasts Forever" also reached number 8 in the UK charts. In 1998, Echo & the Bunnymen teamed up with the Spice Girls and members of Blur as 'England United' to release the official song of the FIFA World Cup – "(How Does It Feel To Be) On Top of the World".

Despite the band's successful return to the live arena, Pattinson decided to leave Echo & the Bunnymen in 1998 for personal reasons. In 2009, he was asked by lifelong friend, Paul Simpson, to play bass for the newly reunited Liverpudlian 1980s band, the Wild Swans. They performed two shows at the Static Gallery in Liverpool in July of that year, and another in December. Pattinson also featured on the Wild Swans' album The Coldest Winter for a Hundred Years, which was released in the summer of 2011, followed by a tour of the UK and the Philippines, where they also performed live for a special appearance on the 'Eat Bulaga!' television show.

In 2013, Pattinson and Will Sergeant, guitarist with Echo & the Bunnymen, formed "Poltergeist" with former Black Velvets drummer Nick Kilroe. They have been playing live and released an album called Your Mind Is A Box (Let Us Fill It With Wonder) in June 2013.

== Playing style ==
Pattinson is self-taught, and has drawn heavily from sixties film and television theme tunes and soundtracks. Lounge and psychedelic music were also a big influence on his playing style, which has ranged from pulsating-looped bass lines in such songs as "Over The Wall" and "All In Your Mind", to playing in the higher register of the neck as in "Bring On The Dancing Horses" and "Heaven Up Here", to strumming 16th-notes in "Nocturnal Me" and "The Back of Love".

Pattinson had used a Fender Mustang short-scale bass and a silver-grill Fender Bassman head with an 8x10 cabinet on Crocodiles, but from Heaven Up Here forward he favoured a 1980 Maui Blue Fender Jazz Bass (sometimes swapping between rosewood and maple necks) playing through an Ampeg SVT head with an 8X10. This equipment and playing style gave Echo & the Bunnymen a distinctive sound. Pattinson has also been seen playing an Olympic White Fender Jazz bass, a black Fender Precision bass, upright and acoustic basses. He has always played with a pick and preferred to play in upstrokes.

== Discography ==
=== Albums ===
Year	Band	Album title
1980	Echo & the Bunnymen	Crocodiles
1981	Echo & the Bunnymen	Heaven Up Here
1983	Echo & the Bunnymen	Porcupine
1984	Echo & the Bunnymen	Ocean Rain
1987	Echo & the Bunnymen	Echo & the Bunnymen
1990	Echo & the Bunnymen	Reverberation
1994	Terry Hall	Home
1997	Echo & the Bunnymen	Evergreen
2011	The Wild Swans	The Coldest Winter for a Hundred Years
2013	Poltergeist	Your Mind Is A Box (Let Us Fill It With Wonder)

== Filmography ==
Pattinson helped write songs that were featured in the following film soundtracks: "Bring On The Dancing Horses" was in the John Hughes film Pretty in Pink. "The Killing Moon" was featured in the films Grosse Pointe Blank and Donnie Darko, and in Series 2, Episode 4 of the E4 series Misfits. A cover version of The Doors song "People Are Strange" was on The Lost Boys soundtrack.

== Bibliography ==
- Reynolds, Simon. Rip it Up and Start Again: Postpunk 1978–1984. London: Penguin, 2005.
