= Zoo Records =

British independent record label

- Founded: 1978
- Founder: David Balfe; Bill Drummond
- Defunct: 1982
- Distributor: ABC-Paramount Records
- Genre: Post-punk, alternative rock
- Country of origin: United Kingdom
- Location: Liverpool, England

Zoo Records was a British independent record label formed by Bill Drummond and David Balfe in 1978. Zoo was launched to release the work of the perennially struggling Liverpool band Big in Japan (the label's first release being the From Y To Z and Never Again EP). The label also released two singles by Lori and the Chameleons, a Balfe and Drummond band which they formed after Big in Japan folded. Zoo Records went on to release early work from The Teardrop Explodes and Echo & the Bunnymen. The label also released the first single, "Iggy Pop's Jacket", by the Liverpool band Those Naughty Lumps.

Only two albums were released on the label: a Scott Walker compilation put together by Julian Cope, called Fire Escape in the Sky, and a label compilation called To the Shores of Lake Placid. In 1990, British reissue label Document took various Zoo singles and tracks from To the Shores of Lake Placid and released a compilation titled ’The Zoo’ Uncaged 1978–1982. Fire Escape in the Sky had the catalogue number Zoo Two, while To the Shores of Lake Placid had Zoo Four. Zoo One was scheduled to be the Teardrop Explodes album Kilimanjaro (later released on Mercury Records) while Zoo Three was to be the same band's album Wilder.

== To the Shores of Lake Placid ==
To the Shores of Lake Placid

Compilation album by Various
- Released: 1982
- Recorded: 1977–1981
- Genre: Post-punk
- Label: Zoo Records (ZOO 4)

To the Shores of Lake Placid was released in 1982 and was compiled by Bill Drummond and Mick Houghton.

=== Track listing (1982) ===
Side one
No.	Title	Writer(s)	Artist	Length
1.	"Society for Cutting Up Men"	Big in Japan	Big in Japan
2.	"Iggy Pop's Jacket"	Peter Hart	Those Naughty Lumps
3.	"When I Dream"	Julian Cope	The Teardrop Explodes
4.	"The Pictures on My Wall"	Leslie Pattinson, Ian McCulloch, Will Sergeant	Echo & the Bunnymen
5.	"Read It in Books"	Julian Cope, Ian McCulloch	Echo & the Bunnymen
6.	"Lonely Spy"	David Balfe, Bill Drummond	Lori and the Chameleons
7.	"The Winds"	David Balfe	The Turquoise Swimming Pools

Side two
No.	Title	Writer(s)	Artist	Length
8.	"Kwalo Klobinsky's Lullaby"	Milk, Kevin Stapleton	Whopper
9.	"A Suicide"	Alan Gill, Dave Hughes	Dalek (I Love You)
10.	"Burst Balloons"	David Balfe	The Turquoise Swimming Pools
11.	"Camera, Camera"	Julian Cope, Gary Dwyer, Mick Finkler, Paul Simpson	The Teardrop Explodes
12.	"Suicide A Go Go"	Big in Japan	Big in Japan
13.	"Villiers Terrace"	Leslie Pattinson, Ian McCulloch, Will Sergeant	Echo & the Bunnymen
14.	"Take A Chance"	Julian Cope, Gary Dwyer, Mick Finkler	The Teardrop Explodes

=== Release notes ===
- Track A1 – previously unreleased. Recorded T.W. Studios October 1977. Licensed from Warner Bros. Music Ltd. Big in Japan: Jayne Casey, Kevin Ward, Bill Drummond, Ian Broudie, Holly Johnson and Phil Allan.
- Track A2 – previously released as single (Zoo Cage 002) January 1979. Recorded Open Eye Studios, Liverpool. Those Naughty Lumps: Peter Hart, Bill Drummond, David Balfe, Kevin Wilkinson and Gerry Culligan.
- Track A3 – the original version, taken from the never released album Everybody Wants to Shag The Teardrop Explodes (Zoo 1). Recorded Rockfield Studios March 1980. The Teardrop Explodes: Julian Cope, Mick Finkler, David Balfe and Gary Dwyer.
- Track A4 – original version featuring Echo, released as single (Zoo Cage 004) March 1979. Recorded August Studios, Liverpool March 1979. Echo and the Bunnymen: Ian McCulloch, Will Sergeant, Leslie Pattinson and Echo.
- Track A5 – B-side of Track A4, not the version on American copies of Crocodiles or Korova Special Offer Version.
- Track A6 – originally released by Zoo Records through Korova Records. Recorded Rockfield Studios January 1980. Lori and the Chameleons: Lori Lartey, Bill Drummond, David Balfe, Gary Dwyer, Ray Martinez and Tim Whittaker.
- Track A7 – previously unreleased. Recorded Rockfield Studios February 1981. The Turquoise Swimming Pools: David Balfe, Hugh Jones and Troy Tate.
- Track B1 – from the forthcoming album The Fuel of the Big Machine, licensed from 'Radio Peeking Duck'. Whopper: Milk (David Balfe), Kevin Stapleton and Buff Manila (Gary Dwyer).
- Track B2 – originally released on Back Door. Recorded Rockfield Studios early 1979. Dalek (I Love You): Alan Gill, Dave Hughes and Chris Hughes.
- Track B3 – previously unreleased. Recorded Rockfield Studios February 1981.
- Track B4 – previously released as B-side of "Sleeping Gas" (Zoo Cage 003). Recorded Open Eye Studios, Liverpool November 1978. The Teardrop Explodes: Julian Cope, Mick Finkler, Paul Simpson and Gary Dwyer.
- Track B5 – previously released on From Y to Z and Never Again (Zoo Cage 001). Licensed from Warner Bros. Music Ltd.
- Track B6 – recorded for John Peel Session May 1979. With kind permission of the BBC.
- Track B7 – previously unreleased. Recorded Cargo, Rochdale November 1979. The Teardrop Explodes: Julian Cope, Mick Finkler, Gerrard Quinn and Gary Dwyer.

=== The Zoo Uncaged 1978–1982 track listing (1995) ===
1. "Suicide A Go Go" – Big in Japan
2. "Nothing Special" – Big in Japan
3. "Iggy Pop's Jacket" – Those Naughty Lumps
4. "Pure and Innocent" – Those Naughty Lumps
5. "Sleeping Gas" – The Teardrop Explodes
6. "Camera Camera" – The Teardrop Explodes
7. "The Pictures on My Wall" – Echo and the Bunnymen
8. "Bouncing Babies" – The Teardrop Explodes
9. "Touch" – Lori & The Chameleons
10. "Love on the Ganges" – Lori and the Chameleons
11. "To See You" – Expelaires
12. "Frequency" – Expelaires
13. "Treason" – The Teardrop Explodes
14. "Books" – The Teardrop Explodes
15. "Revolutionary Spirit" – The Wild Swans
16. "God Forbid" – The Wild Swans
17. "Society For Cutting Up Young Men" – Big in Japan
18. "Taxi" – Big in Japan
19. "Cindy and the Barbi Dolls" – Big in Japan

== Lori and the Chameleons ==
Lori and the Chameleons were a short-lived new wave band that existed during 1979 and 1980. Formed in Liverpool by ex-Big in Japan's Bill Drummond (guitar) and David Balfe (bass, keyboards), and the singer Lori Lartey, they combined synthpop, and post-punk styles in their songs.

Lori and the Chameleons released only two singles while together, in 1979 and 1980. The first, "Touch", was written over the course of a year by Balfe and Drummond, based on Lartey's holiday in Tokyo two years earlier. Tim Whitaker of Deaf School/Pink Military played drums on the single. "Touch" spent one week in the UK Singles Chart in December 1979, at No. 70. A second single, "The Lonely Spy" featured Gary Dwyer of the Teardrop Explodes on drums and Ray Martinez on trumpet. Lartey went to art school, while Balfe and Drummond began to work with the Teardrop Explodes, as keyboardist and manager, respectively.

=== Discography ===
- "Touch" / "Love on the Ganges" (1979), Zoo (7-inch single)
- "The Lonely Spy" / "Peru" (1980), Korova (7-inch single)
- "Touch" / "The Lonely Spy" / "Love on the Ganges"^{*} (1981), Korova (7/12-inch single)

^{*}on 12-inch single only

== Bibliography ==
- Rip It Up And Start Again: Post-punk 1978–1984 by Simon Reynolds. ISBN 0-571-21570-X
