= Echo & the Bunnymen =

English rock band

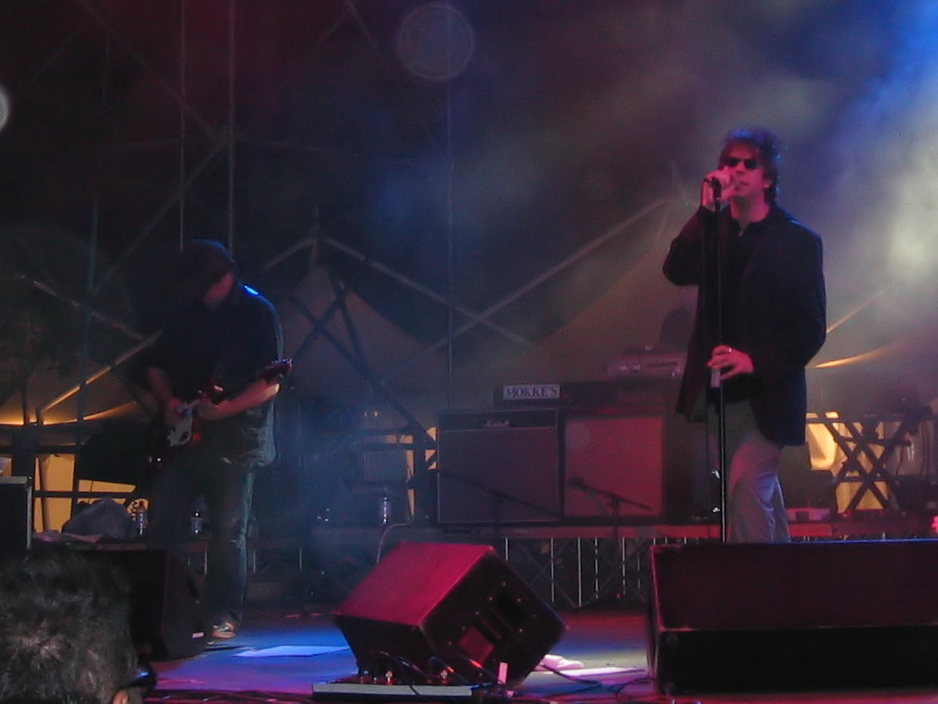
- Will Sergeant (left) and Ian McCulloch (right) at the Frequenze Disturbate Festival in August 2005

Background information
- Origin: Liverpool, England
- Genres: Post-punk; new wave; neo-psychedelia
- Works: Discography
- Years active: 1978–1993; 1996–present
- Labels: Korova; Zoo; Sire; Warner Bros.; Euphoric; London; Cooking Vinyl; Ocean Rain
- Members: Ian McCulloch; Will Sergeant
- Past members: Les Pattinson; Pete de Freitas; Jake Brockman; Noel Burke; Damon Reece
- Website: bunnymen.com

Echo & the Bunnymen are an English rock band formed in Liverpool in 1978. The original line-up consisted of vocalist Ian McCulloch, guitarist Will Sergeant and bassist Les Pattinson. In 1979, Pete de Freitas joined as the band's drummer.

Their 1980 debut album, Crocodiles, went into the top 20 of the UK Albums Chart. After releasing their second album, Heaven Up Here, in 1981, the band's cult status was followed by mainstream success in the UK in 1983 when they scored a UK Top 10 hit with "The Cutter", and the album which the song came from, Porcupine, hit number 2 in the UK. Ocean Rain (1984), continued the band's UK chart success with its lead single "The Killing Moon" entering into the top 10.

After they released a self-titled album in 1987, McCulloch left the band and was replaced by singer Noel Burke. In 1989, de Freitas was killed in a motorcycle accident. After working together as Electrafixion, McCulloch and Sergeant regrouped with Pattinson in 1997 and returned as Echo & the Bunnymen, before Pattinson's departure in 1998. The band have toured and released several albums since the late 1990s to varying degrees of success. In more recent years the band have headlined the Rockaway Beach Festival twice.

== History ==
=== Early years ===
Ian McCulloch began his career in 1977, as one third of the Crucial Three, a bedroom band which also featured Julian Cope and Pete Wylie. When Wylie left, McCulloch and Cope formed the short-lived A Shallow Madness with drummer Dave Pickett and organist Paul Simpson, during which time such songs as "Read It in Books", "Robert Mitchum", "You Think It's Love" and "Spacehopper" were written by the pair. When McCulloch left the band, A Shallow Madness changed their name to the Teardrop Explodes, and McCulloch joined with guitarist Will Sergeant and bass player Les Pattinson to form Echo & the Bunnymen. This early incarnation of the band featured a drum machine, assumed by many to be "Echo", though this has been denied by the band. In the 1982 book Liverpool Explodes!, Will Sergeant explained the origin of the band's name:

We had this mate who kept suggesting all these names like the Daz Men or Glisserol and the Fan Extractors. Echo and the Bunnymen was one of them. I thought it was just as stupid as the rest.

In November 1978, Echo & the Bunnymen made their debut at Liverpool's Eric's Club, appearing as the opening act for the Teardrop Explodes. The band played one song, a 20-minute version of "Monkeys" which was entitled "I Bagsy Yours" at the time.

Echo & the Bunnymen's debut single "The Pictures on My Wall" was released on Bill Drummond and David Balfe's Zoo Records in May 1979, the B-side being "Read It in Books" (also recorded by the Teardrop Explodes approximately six months later as the B-side of their final Zoo Records single "Treason"). Though credited as a McCulloch/Cope collaboration, McCulloch has denied on more than one occasion that Cope had any involvement with its writing.

With the group now gaining wider attention, they were invited to record a four-song set for the BBC'S John Peel Show on 22 August, at which time they were still using a drum machine. This was the first of six live sets they would cut for the Peel show between 1979 and 1983.

By the time of their debut album, 1980's Crocodiles (July 1980), the drum machine had been replaced by Trinidad-born Pete de Freitas. Unlike the other band members, who were from working class Liverpool families, de Freitas was considered "posh" – he came from an affluent background, grew up in the south of England, and attended an elite private school. Despite his different background, the drummer's affable and outgoing manner was a welcome addition for his famously fractious bandmates. De Freitas met the trio at their 15 September 1979 gig at Eric's in Liverpool and immediately joined the band, but his 12 October live debut with them at London's Electric Ballroom was less than auspicious. Supporting hugely popular ska bands Madness and Bad Manners, the Bunnymen proved an uncomfortable fit, and they were booed off after just two songs.

"Rescue" (produced by Ian Broudie), the lead single from Crocodiles, reached No. 62 on the UK singles chart but the album (co-produced by manager Bill Drummond and his business partner David Balfe of the Teardrop Explodes) broke into the Top 20, reaching No. 17, and garnered wide critical acclaim.

Eschewing the traditional "pin-up" cover shot, Crocodiles featured an atmospheric cover image, which showed the band posed in a mysterious woodland setting, lit by hidden coloured lights. Designed by Martyn Atkins and photographed by Brian Griffin, it became the first in a coordinated series of elemental-themed album covers by Atkins and Griffin, which spanned their first four LPs, each depicting the band posed at some distance from the camera, in a visually striking natural setting – a forest (Crocodiles), a beach at sunset (Heaven Up Here), a frozen waterfall in Iceland (Porcupine) and a subterranean river (Ocean Rain). It would not be until their fifth, self-titled album that the band employed a traditional group portrait.

=== Shine So Hard ===
The band embarked on their first major concert tour between September and December 1980 to promote Crocodiles, supported by London band the Sound, during which they performed their first European concerts in France, The Netherlands and Germany. The end of the Camo tour was followed by a four-month break, mainly dedicated to the preparation and recording of their second LP.

Manager Bill Drummond (later of KLF) and lighting director Bill Butt launched plans for a one-off promotional concert event as the final date of the Camo tour, which would be professionally filmed and recorded. It was primarily intended to provide material for the group's first music video, but Drummond and Butt's vision went well beyond the conventional three-minute pop-rock promotional clip, and it reflected their desire to capture Echo & the Bunnymen's live performance during this crucial breakthrough phase of their career. Butt was slated to direct, but British film union regulations at the time meant that the film would not be distributed commercially unless it was directed by a union member. Butt took over as producer, and on the recommendation of their mutual friend, Patrick Duval, Butt engaged novice filmmaker John Smith, who had earned a union ticket for a film he had directed while at university.

After extensive consultation with their clients, Smith and Duval were "embedded" in Buxton with the band in the week leading up to the concert, and they were given a free hand to structure, shoot and edit the project. Smith and Duval shaped the first part of the film around the differing characters of the four band members, filming both the town and the musicians, but using unusual shooting angles and perspectives. This material was then assembled into an impressionistic sequence of seemingly disconnected images, which are gradually revealed to be a montage of the activities of the band members as they prepare for and head to the show.

The concert was staged on 17 January 1981, in the striking Victorian-era glass concert hall in the Buxton Pavilion Gardens in Derbyshire before a specially invited audience. Before the show, advertisements had been placed in the music press, and 500 lucky fans who responded were given free passes and a map directing them to the secret location (called "Gomorrah" in the advertisement), which also advised "BE PREPARED: THIS IS AN ATLAS ADVENTURE". For an additional fee of £5, coach transport was provided for fans from London, Liverpool and other cities.

Although inclement winter weather complicated the rehearsals, causing transport headaches for the band, as well as for their fans, the concert went ahead as planned, with the band taking the stage 30 minutes after the scheduled start time. The performance was filmed by Smith, Duval and cameraman Mike Tomlinson, with multitrack audio recorded on the Manor Mobile studio by Peter Woods. The footage captures the band at the height of their early success, and documents both their musical prowess as a live act and the impressive staging and lighting designed by Bill Butt. The set list was drawn mainly from Crocodiles, plus previews of several tracks from the upcoming second album.

The finished 33-minute short film combined Smith and Duval's opening montage with dynamic footage of four songs from the show. Titled Shine So Hard: An Atlas Adventure, it was given a limited UK cinema release, but Warner executives were reportedly dismayed by its avant-garde structure and the fact that the band don't even appear clearly until partway through the film. The audio recordings of the four songs featured in the film were also released on the "Shine So Hard" EP, which reached #37 on the UK singles chart, thus becoming the group's first British hit single. In 1982, the film was released as a limited edition of 500 VHS cassettes, redeemable only with a voucher given out to those who had attended the concert, and copies found their way onto the second-hand market.

=== Heaven Up Here ===
Beginning in April 1981, the band commenced another round of touring to promote the forthcoming album. This included their first North American dates in New York, Toronto, Pittsburgh, Detroit, Chicago, Boston, San Francisco, and Los Angeles. After another round of shows in the UK and Europe mid-year, they returned to America for more shows during October, and in November they made their only visit to Australia, including a show on 11 November at the Manly Vale Hotel on Sydney's northern beaches. This was recorded, and four tracks from that concert were subsequently included as bonus tracks on the 2003 CD reissue of the second album.

Heaven Up Here was recorded at Rockfield Studios in Wales during March, and was released in May 1981. Produced by the band and Hugh Jones, it proved a very positive and enjoyable recording experience for the band, and became an even bigger critical and commercial success, reaching the UK Top Ten (No. 10), although "A Promise", the sole single lifted from the album, only reached UK No. 49. In July that year, Rolling Stone described them as "the best band to come out of Liverpool since the Beatles". The album's cover image continued the elemental theme of Crocodiles, and depicted the group standing on a beach, with their backs to the camera, looking out to sea, silhouetted against a bank of storm clouds at sunset, with a flock of seagulls flying across sky in front of them. The photograph was taken on the beach at Porthcawl in South Wales on a day off from recording. According to photographer Brian Griffin, they had to use buckets of fish offal to entice the seagulls to fly through the shot. Manager Bill Drummond and Korova label head, Rob Dickins, reportedly hated the image and Atkins, Griffin and the band had to fight to have it accepted as the cover shot.

=== Porcupine and mainstream success ===
After another break over the winter, the band played three UK dates in April 1982. In June, they achieved their first top 20 UK hit single with "The Back of Love" (No. 19). In July, they began a short round of festival appearances and headlining concerts in Britain and Europe, including an appearance at the first WOMAD festival, where they were joined onstage for the song "All My Colours (Zimbo)" by the Drummers of Burundi. Their only American date that year was a one-off show at New York's Peppermint Lounge on 24 August, and their 1982 touring schedule concluded with four UK dates in December.

Much of 1982 was taken with the difficult and protracted process of recording of their highly anticipated third album, Porcupine, which reunited them with Crocodiles producer Ian Broudie (who was also Sergeant's housemate at the time). Several members also undertook outside projects during the year. Pete de Freitas produced and played drums on Liverpool band the Wild Swans' debut single "Revolutionary Spirit", and lead guitarist Will Sergeant recorded a solo album of instrumental music titled Themes for 'Grind' (1982).

The original version of Porcupine was rejected by Warner Bros as "too uncommercial", so (over Sergeant's objections) the band agreed to re-record the entire LP, and Drummond brought in noted Indian violinist and composer Shankar to add strings. During this period, tensions within the band had increased dramatically. Bassist Les Pattinson was openly expressing his weariness with the industry, and personal relations among the four deteriorated to the point that they either refused to speak to each other or argued when they did. McCulloch later described the band's mood at this time as "horrible", and de Freitas stated that, in stark contrast to the quick and confident making of Heaven Up Here, he felt that "we had to drag it out of ourselves" with Porcupine. Despite these impediments, the re-recording went relatively smoothly, and the sessions ultimately produced their UK chart breakthrough.

Released in early 1983, the more radio-friendly "The Cutter", became their first top 10 single, climbing to No. 8, while the parent album Porcupine (Feb. 1983), hit No. 2 in the album chart. Now firmly established as a chart act, further hits followed with a one-off single, the dance-oriented "Never Stop" (No. 15), and the epic "The Killing Moon", a preview from the new album featuring a dramatic McCulloch vocal, which became the band's second UK top 10 single at No. 9.

=== Ocean Rain ===
The band kicked off a hectic year of touring in 1984 with their first dates in Japan, in January, followed by a month-long round of dates in the United States beginning in March. April-May saw them playing concerts in Europe and the UK, followed by the second and more extensive leg of their U.S. tour during August-September, concluding with a show at the famed Greek Theater in Los Angeles on 9 September. The band then immediately undertook an intensive two-month UK tour, beginning in Dublin on 15 September and concluding at London's Brixton Academy on 24 October (their last concert of 1984).

Following a PR campaign that proclaimed it "the greatest album ever made" according to McCulloch, 1984's Ocean Rain reached No. 4, and today is widely regarded as the band's landmark album. Single extracts "Silver" (UK No. 30) and "Seven Seas" (UK No. 16) consolidated the album's continued commercial success. In the same year, McCulloch had a minor solo hit with his cover version of the Kurt Weill standard "September Song".

After the release of Ocean Rain, manager Bill Drummond announced that the band was taking a year off to write material for the next album, but at the end of 1984 they replaced him, reportedly because they were unhappy that the band wasn't making enough money. Drummond was succeeded by Duran Duran tour manager Mick Hancock.

Echo & the Bunnymen resumed work with a tour of Scandinavia in April 1985, performing cover versions of songs from Television, the Rolling Stones, Talking Heads, and the Doors. Recordings from the tour emerged as the semi-bootleg On Strike. On 21 June, they performed a headlining set at that year's Glastonbury Festival, where they premiered two new songs from their next album.

=== Fifth album and departure of de Freitas ===
Ocean Rain proved difficult to follow up, and their only releases in 1985 were the single, "Bring on the Dancing Horses" (UK No. 21), and a compilation album, Songs to Learn & Sing, which made No. 6 in the UK album chart.

1985/86 proved to be the turning point in the group's career. During their regular winter break, drummer Pete de Freitas had moved to America with a loose group of musical colleagues, friends and hangers-on dubbed The Sex Gods, but the other Bunnymen and his family later revealed that de Freitas was suffering from escalating mental health and drug problems, and following a New Year's Eve drug binge in New Orleans, de Freitas announced that he had quit the band. With tour commitments looming, the remaining members hastily recruited former Haircut One Hundred drummer Blair Cunningham as their new drummer, but he did not fit in, and left after their Spring 1986 American tour. Cunningham was replaced by former ABC drummer David Palmer.

Echo & the Bunnymen began recording material for the new album with Broudie and producer Clive Langer, but were unhappy with the results and the recordings were shelved. They then recorded with Laurie Latham, who was chosen by McCulloch because he had been impressed by Latham's work on the Stranglers' single "Skin Deep". The group returned to the studio to record more material with a new producer, Gil Norton, but in July, David Palmer left the group and de Freitas expressed his wish to rejoin. The other members were concerned about both his commitment to the band and his drug and mental health problems, so he returned to group as a hired musician rather than a full member of the band. The revised lineup performed live on BBC TV in September, presenting two new songs, "The Game" and "Lips Like Sugar", but by this stage, they were under intense pressure from their label to create what Warner considered to be more commercial material. Will Sergeant later recalled the band's outrage when Warner executive Rob Dickens played them Peter Gabriel's album So, declaring "I want you to sound like this!"

Their fifth studio album, the self-titled Echo & the Bunnymen (1987), was initially recorded with Palmer, but when de Freitas returned in late 1986, it was largely re-recorded. Like Porcupine, the making of the album proved to be a difficult and protracted process. Early sessions with Gil Norton took place at the famous Cologne studio of German producer Conny Plank, but both band and label were unhappy with the results and these recordings were shelved. They began re-recording material from the Cologne sessions with Laurie Latham in Brussels, but the sessions were gruelling, with Latham spending up to a month on a single song, and tensions within the band were being inflamed by McCulloch's increasing alcohol use and the star treatment he was being accorded. Released in mid-1987, the record sold well (UK No. 4), and was a small American hit, their only LP to have significant sales there. It is also significant as the final album to be recorded with the original lineup. Although the album was a significant commercial success, it received mixed reviews from critics, and was disliked by the band, who were sharply critical of the mixing and production.

=== Departure of McCulloch, death of de Freitas, sixth album, and disbandment ===
The band contributed a cover version of the Doors song "People Are Strange" to The Lost Boys soundtrack, released at the end of July 1987. It featured a guest appearance by original Doors keyboard player Ray Manzarek, who also contributed keyboards to a re-recorded version of "Bedbugs and Ballyhoo". The group jointly headlined an American tour with New Order in August-September 1987, followed by a UK tour in the northern autumn. After a winter break they undertook another round of touring in the U.S. and the UK, to general acclaim, but the March 1988 single release of "People Are Strange" drew withering reviews from the music press, with Melody Maker denouncing it as "a rancid effort".

After the completion of a Japanese tour in April 1988, lead singer Ian McCulloch announced the band would split up. Following the announcement, McCulloch returned to the United Kingdom to visit his father who had just suffered two heart attacks and who died just before McCulloch was able to visit him. After five months of speculation as to whether the split was genuine, McCulloch met with the other members of the band in September 1988 and, despite attempts to change his mind, told them he was leaving. He later said "The last days of the Bunnymen consisted of a bunch of people who were more interested in changing oil in their cars than rock 'n' roll. That pissed me off. I was doing every sodding interview, writing sodding every song." Having been persuaded by Rob Dickins at WEA that the band could still be a success in the United States, Sergeant told McCulloch that he and the other two band members, bassist Les Pattinson and drummer Pete de Freitas, planned to continue.

After a failed attempt to record with the B-52's singers Kate Pierson and Cindy Wilson, the band advertised for a full-time replacement. Former Bourgie Bourgie singer Paul Quinn and former Colenso Parade singer Oscar Askin both auditioned but ultimately turned down offers to take over from McCulloch. Keyboardist Jake Brockman (a touring member of the band for several years previously, and a contributor to the 1987 album) was promoted to full member, and after hearing an album by the defunct UK group St Vitus Dance, the Bunnymen offered the lead singer spot to vocalist Noel Burke, who accepted after the band assured him that they did not want "a McCulloch clone".

Their plans were thrown into disarray when Pete de Freitas was killed in a motorcycle accident on 14 June 1989. De Freitas was on his way to Liverpool from London to take part in the group's first rehearsal with Burke, when his Ducati motorbike collided with another vehicle on the A51 at Longdon Green in Staffordshire, killing him instantly. He was 27 years old and was survived by his widow and their infant daughter. After recruiting new drummer Damon Reece to replace de Freitas, the new five-piece Bunnymen recorded the psychedelic-tinged Reverberation in 1990 with renowned former Beatles engineer and producer Geoff Emerick. The album did not generate much interest among fans or critics; it sold poorly, and the band was dropped by Warner Bros.

In a 2003 interview, McCulloch said of his replacement with Burke:

I think it's pretty obvious what I think. Noel Burke... the name says it all really doesn't it? No, that's not fair. It wasn't his fault, it was Will and Pete who were the berks really. But no, I thought it was disgraceful and after that I suppose it was quite surprising that I continued working with Will after that. I'm glad I did though. Johnny Marr called them Echo and the Bogusmen when that happened.

Sergeant later said that keeping the original band name was "down to wanting to take a bitter swipe at [McCulloch]". Meanwhile, McCulloch released his well-received debut solo album, Candleland, in September 1989, shortly after de Freitas' death. His follow-up solo album was Mysterio in 1992.

After two more unsuccessful singles, which were released independently, the Bunnymen disbanded in 1993.

=== Reformation ===
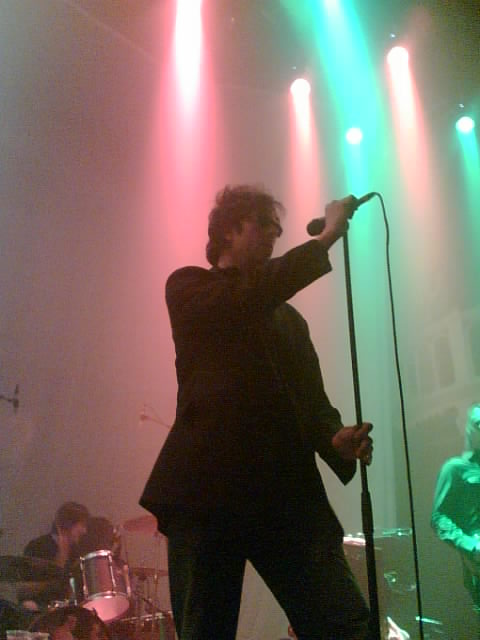
Echo & the Bunnymen at Paradiso, Amsterdam, in 2006

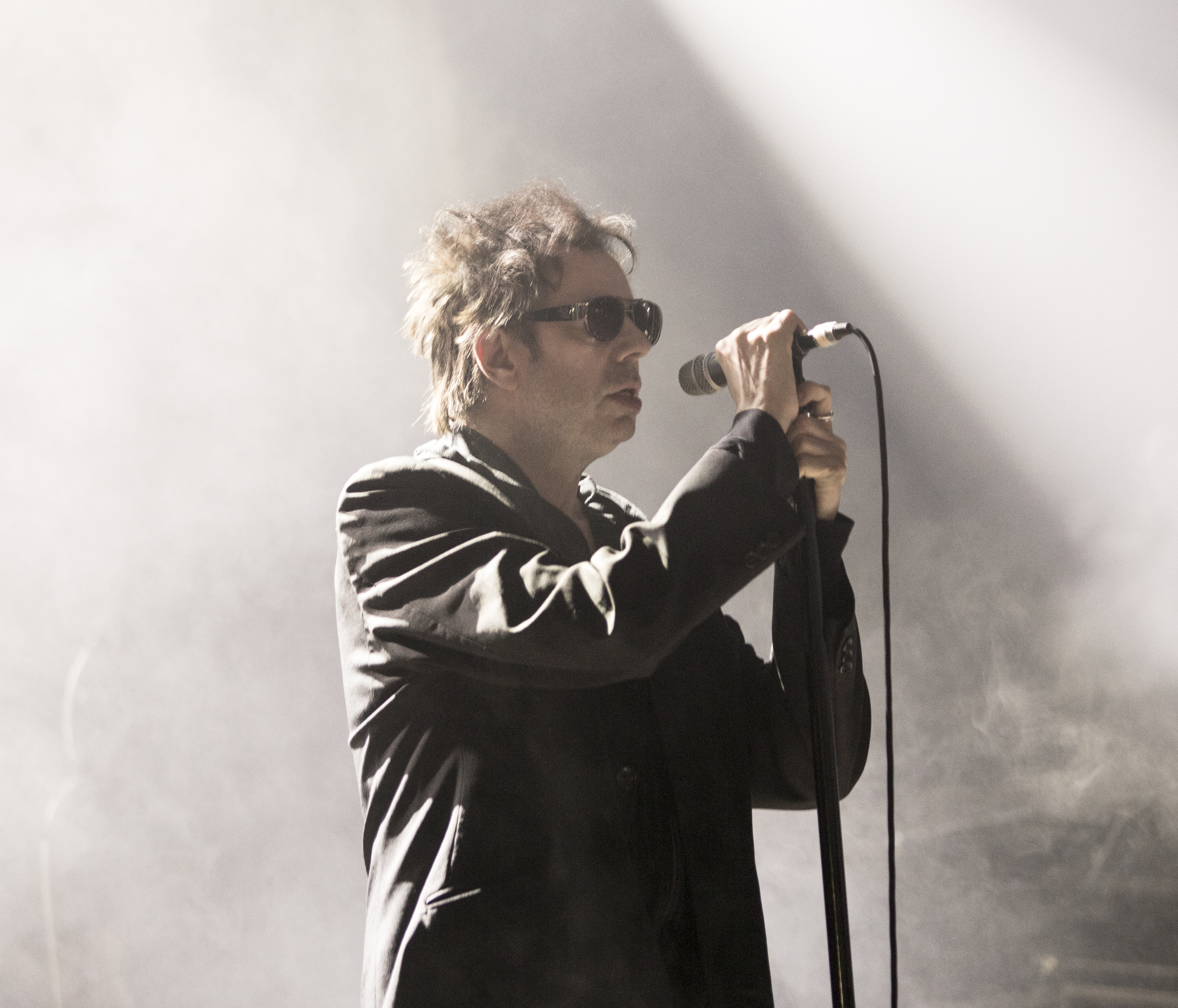
Ian McCulloch at the Festival Internacional de Benicàssim 2016

In 1994, McCulloch and Sergeant began working together again under the name Electrafixion; in 1997, Pattinson rejoined the duo, as did Colin Mackin, meaning the three surviving members of the original Bunnymen line-up were now working together again. Rather than continue as Electrafixion, the trio resurrected the Echo & the Bunnymen name and released the album Evergreen (1997), which reached the UK Top 10.

Immediately before the release of the band's next album What Are You Going to Do with Your Life? (1999), Les Pattinson quit to take care of his mother. McCulloch and Sergeant have continued to tour and record as Echo & the Bunnymen, touring repeatedly and releasing the albums Flowers (2001), Siberia (2005), The Fountain (2009) and Meteorites (2014). The Siberia band line up was Ian McCulloch, Will Sergeant, Paul Fleming (keyboards), Simon Finley (drums) and Pete Wilkinson/Colin Mackin (bass), Hugh Jones produced Siberia after previously engineering early Bunnymen albums. Since August 2009 the group's touring incarnation has comprised McCulloch and Sergeant along with Stephen Brannan (bass), Gordy Goudie (guitar), Nicholas Kilroe (drums) and Jez Wing (keyboards).

In 2002, the group received the Q Inspiration award. The award is for inspiring "new generations of musicians, songs and music lovers in general." The band were said to be worthy winners as they have done much to promote the Mersey music scene. In a later interview for Magnet magazine, McCulloch said "It validates everything that we've tried to achieve—cool, great timeless music. It's not like an inspiration award affecting the past, it's affecting the current music."

On 11 September 2006, Echo & the Bunnymen released an updated version of their 1985 Songs to Learn and Sing compilation. Now re-titled More Songs to Learn and Sing, this compilation was issued in two versions, a 17-track single CD and a 20-track version with a DVD featuring eight videos from their career.

In March 2007, the Bunnymen announced that they had re-signed to Warner and were working on a new album. The band were said to be planning a live DVD, titled Dancing Horses, which contained interviews with the band. This was released in May 2007 on Snapper/SPV. The live lineup was Ian McCulloch, Will Sergeant, Simon Finley (drums), Paul Fleming (keyboards), Gordy Goudie (guitar) and Steve Brannan (bass).

On 11 January 2008, McCulloch was interviewed on BBC Breakfast at the start of Liverpool 08. He was asked about new Bunnymen material and he revealed that a new album would coincide with their gig at the Royal Albert Hall in September. He went on to say that the album was "the best one we've made, apart from Ocean Rain". In a 20 April 2008 interview with the Sunday Mail, McCulloch announced The Fountain as the title of the new Echo & the Bunnymen album with producers John McLaughlin and Simon Perry, which was originally due to be released in 2008 but was finally released on 12 October 2009. "Think I Need It Too", the first single from the album, was released on 28 September 2009.

On 1 September 2009, former keyboard player Jake Brockman died on the Isle of Man when his motorbike collided with a converted ambulance. Brockman had played keyboards for the band during the 1980s.

In December 2010, Echo & the Bunnymen went on tour playing their first two albums Crocodiles and Heaven Up Here in their entirety.

Echo & the Bunnymen's next album of new material, Meteorites, was released on 26 May 2014 in the UK, and on 3 June 2014 in the US via 429 Records. The album was released on the pledgemusic.com website. It was produced and mixed by Youth, who also co-wrote three of the tracks and played some bass. It was the band's first UK Top 40 album entry since 1999.

In 2018, they released a compilation album with reworked orchestral versions of older material and two new songs, titled The Stars, the Oceans & the Moon, to mixed reception.

In September 2023, a four-date tour saw the group perform Ocean Rain in full in the UK.

In July 2026, the band announced and released the single "Brussels is Haunted". They also announced a forthcoming album, titled Apples for Isaac.

== Members ==
=== Current ===
- Will Sergeant – lead guitar, programming (1978–1993, 1996–present)
- Ian McCulloch – vocals, rhythm guitar, keyboards (1978–1988, 1996–present)

=== Former ===
- Les Pattinson – bass (1978–1993, 1996–1998)
- Pete de Freitas – drums (1979–1989; died 1989)
- Noel Burke – vocals, rhythm guitar, keyboards (1988–1993)
- Damon Reece – drums (1989–1993)
- Jake Brockman – keyboards (1989–1993; died 2009)

=== Touring ===
- Stephen Brannan – bass / backing vocals (2005–present)
- Simon Finley – drums (2005–2006, 2018–present)
- Pete Reilly – guitar / backing vocals (2016–present)
- Mike Smith - keyboards / sax / backing vocals (2022–present)

=== Former touring ===
- Michael Lee – drums (1996–2001; died 2008)
- Jeremy Stacey – drums (1999–2001) on "What Are You Going To Do..." album and tour
- Joe Mckechnie – drums (UK Tour December 1999 & Millennium Gig in front of St Georges Hall, Liverpool, 31 December 1999)
- Vinny Jamieson – drums (2001–2003) on "Flowers" album and tour
- Simon Finley – drums (2003–2005)
- Nicholas Kilroe – drums (2007–2017)
- Guy Pratt – bass (1998–2000) on "What Are You Going To Do..." album and tour
- Alex Germains – bass (2000–2003)
- Pete Wilkinson – bass (2003–2005)
- Paul Fleming – keyboards (2003–2009)
- Ged Malley – rhythm guitar (2003)
- Gordy Goudie – rhythm guitar (2004–2017) on "The Fountain" album and tour
- Kelley Stoltz – guitars (2016–2017)
- Pete Reilly – rhythm guitar (2018)
- Alan Watts – rhythm guitar (2019–2020)
- Gillian Grant – violin (2018)
- Kirsty Main – violin (2018)
- Annemarie McGahon – viola (2018)
- Heather Lynn – cello (2018)

== Discography ==
- Crocodiles (1980)
- Heaven Up Here (1981)
- Porcupine (1983)
- Ocean Rain (1984)
- Echo & the Bunnymen (1987)
- Reverberation (1990)
- Evergreen (1997)
- What Are You Going to Do with Your Life? (1999)
- Flowers (2001)
- Siberia (2005)
- The Fountain (2009)
- Meteorites (2014)
- Apples for Isaac (2026)

== General and cited references ==
- Adams, Chris (1 July 2002). Turquoise Days: The Weird World of Echo and the Bunnymen. New York: Soft Skull Press. ISBN 1-887128-89-1.
- Fletcher, Tony (16 November 1987). Never Stop: The Echo & the Bunnymen Story. London: Omnibus Press. ISBN 0-7119-1121-5.
- Reynolds, Simon. Rip It Up and Start Again: Postpunk 1978–1984. London: Penguin, 2005.
