= David Balfe =

English musician and recording executive

- Also known as: Dave Balfe, The Chameleons (along Bill Drummond)
- Born: David Balfe; 2 October 1958 (age 67); Carlisle, Cumberland, England
- Origin: Liverpool, England
- Genres: Punk rock; new wave; post-punk; synth-pop
- Occupations: Musician; record producer
- Instruments: Bass guitar; keyboards
- Years active: Mid-1970s–present
- Labels: Zoo; Food

David Iain William Miguel Balfe (born 2 October 1958) is an English musician and record company executive, most notable for playing keyboards with the Teardrop Explodes, founding the Zoo and Food independent record labels, signing Blur, and for being the subject of their first number one hit, "Country House".

== Biography ==
David Balfe grew up in Merseyside, where he played with several Liverpool bands in the late 1970s that emerged from the city's legendary Eric's club scene, including Radio Blank, Big in Japan, Dalek I Love You, the Teardrop Explodes and Lori and the Chameleons. He also played keyboards on and co-produced the first Echo & the Bunnymen and the Teardrop Explodes albums, as well as managing both bands with Bill Drummond for the years from their inception to early success.

== Zoo records ==
Balfe and Drummond, having met while playing together in Big in Japan, founded the Zoo record label in 1978 to release Big in Japan's posthumous EP From Y to Z and Never Again. The label went on to sign and release the early work of the Teardrop Explodes and Echo & the Bunnymen.

Balfe and Drummond produced both bands early recordings and first albums, working under the name the Chameleons. They also released their own music, singles "Touch" and "The Lonely Spy" – credited to Lori and the Chameleons – on the Zoo label, later licensing them to Sire/Korova.

Although they released a few other artists, the Teardrop Explodes and Echo & the Bunnymen grew to take up most of their time. Eventually, due to lack of finance, they signed both bands to major London record companies and continued to manage them, while letting the label fade into inactivity.

Balfe and Drummond's publishing company, Zoo Music, signed many of the above and below artists, as well as multi-million selling acts the Proclaimers in 1987 and Drummond's later band the KLF.

== The Teardrop Explodes ==
Balfe began as the Teardrop Explodes' label head, manager and producer, but on the departure of their original keyboard player, Paul Simpson, after their first single, Balfe stepped in for what turned into four years in and out of the band, having a famously tempestuous relationship with their singer, Julian Cope. He played keyboards on their top 10 single "Reward", and their two gold albums, Kilimanjaro (1980) and Wilder (1981).

After the Teardrop Explodes disbanded in 1983, Balfe moved to London where, after managing Strawberry Switchblade (UK top 5 hit with "Since Yesterday") and Brilliant (the post-Killing Joke band of subsequently famous producer Youth), he then founded the Food record label in 1984.

== Food records ==
Food, initially funded by Balfe alone, signed Voice of the Beehive, Zodiac Mindwarp (both of whom moved on to major labels, while Balfe continued to manage them for many years), Crazyhead, and Diesel Park West, before signing a deal with EMI to fund and distribute the label worldwide while retaining creative independence.

They then signed Jesus Jones who went on to have a number one album in the UK and multi-million sales internationally with their second album, Doubt, and a number one single in the U.S. with "Right Here Right Now". A year after signing Jesus Jones, they signed Blur.

Balfe, along with his later label partner Andy Ross, convinced the band to change their name from 'Seymour' to Blur on signing in 1989.

Balfe also directed Blur's first two music videos, "She's So High" and "There's No Other Way".

Disenchanted with the alternative scene in the years of grunge, Balfe decided to sell the Food label to EMI in 1994, and semi-retire with his young family to the country – inspiring Damon Albarn to pen Blur's first No. 1 hit, "Country House".

== Later work ==
Balfe returned to the music business to take up a position at Sony Music from 1996 to 1999 as General Manager and Head of A&R of the Columbia label. His most notable success of that period was the million-selling Kula Shaker.

Since then, Balfe has received a BA in Creative Writing from the University of Bedfordshire in 2003 and, in 2006, an MA in screenwriting from the University of Westminster.

In June 2010, Balfe received the Mojo Magazine Inspiration Award on behalf of the Teardrop Explodes. It was presented by Alex James from Blur.

In May 2018, Balfe was elected as a Labour councillor for Eastbrook Ward in Adur, but did not stand for re-election in 2022.

In 2025, Balfe began releasing music as a musician again in a partnership with his old Dalek I Love You colleague Dave Hughes, under the name 'Late Transmissions starring Eve Quartermain'. Their first album, The Heart Wants What It Wants, is released on 1 May 2026.
