= Will Sergeant =

English guitarist (born 1958)

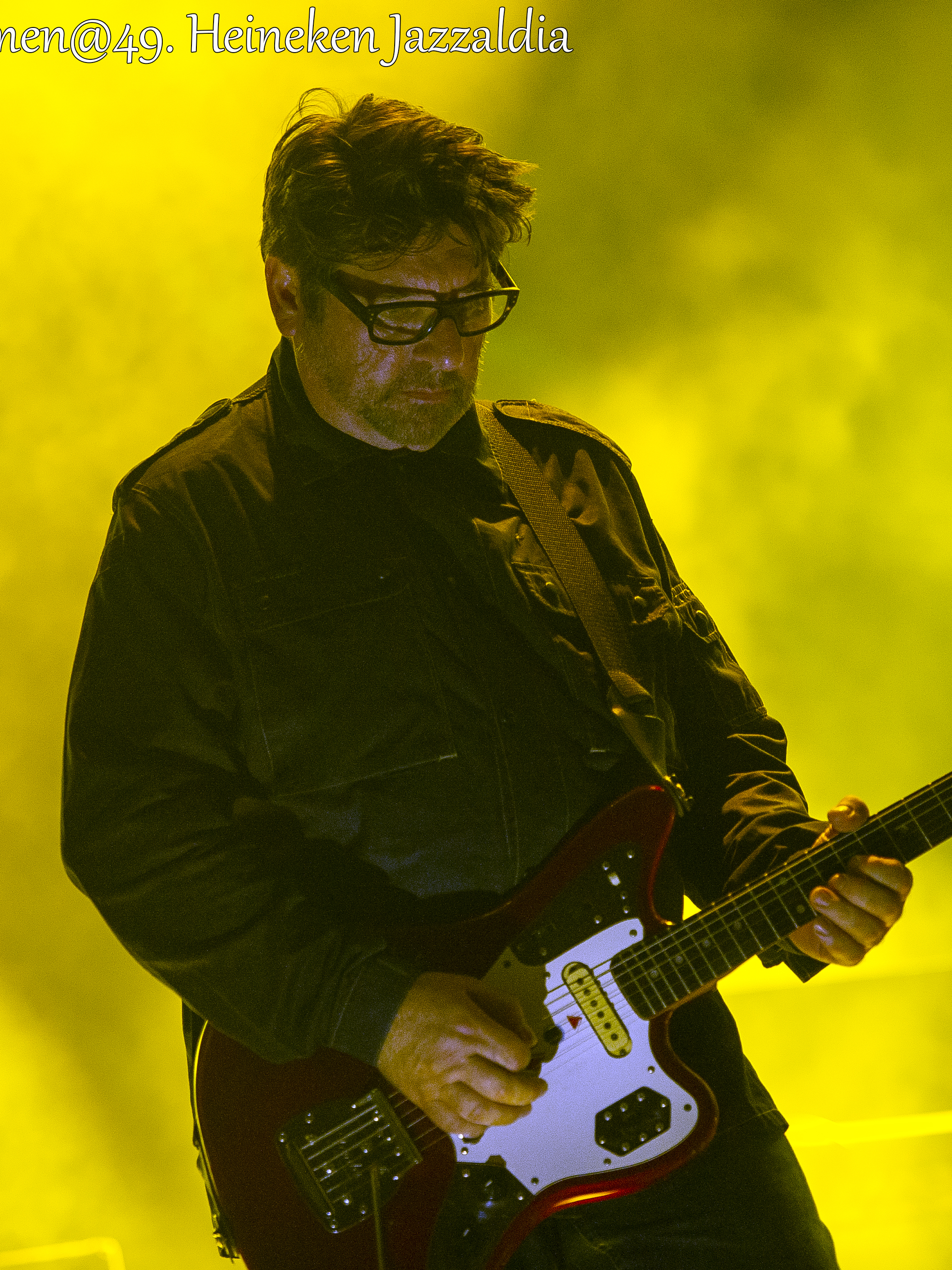
- Sergeant in 2014

Background information
- Born: William Alfred Sergeant; 12 April 1958 (age 68), Liverpool, England
- Genres: Post-punk, alternative rock, ambient, psychedelic, experimental, post-rock
- Instrument: Guitar
- Years active: 1978–present
- Labels: Zoo, Korova, Sire Records, WEA, 92 Happy Customers, Ochre Records, Earworm Records, London Records, Cooking Vinyl, Spiffing, Proper Records, Weatherbox, 429 Records, Epic Records
- Formerly of: Echo & the Bunnymen; Electrafixion; Glide; Poltergeist; The Serpents
- Website: willsergeant.com

William Alfred Sergeant (born 12 April 1958) is an English guitarist, best known for being a member of Echo & the Bunnymen. He is the group's only constant member.

== Career ==
As a solo artist, Sergeant focused on minimalism and atmospherics, and usually released entirely instrumental music. Sergeant's first solo work was in 1978, when he self-produced Weird As Fish and made a total of seven copies. The album was officially released 25 years later. Early in the life of Echo & the Bunnymen, Sergeant recorded La Vie Luonge, a soundtrack piece for a short Bunnymen concert film of the same name. His first formal solo album, Themes for Grind, was released in 1982, while still active with Echo & the Bunnymen, and reached number 6 on the Indie album chart.

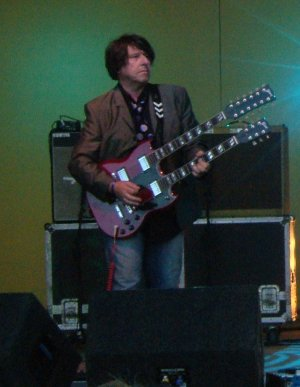
Performing in 2007 at the Summer Sundae festival.

Sergeant continued with the Bunnymen after Ian McCulloch left in 1988, bringing in Noel Burke to sing on Reverberation in 1990, before breaking up the band in 1993. In 1994, Sergeant and McCulloch reunited to form Electrafixion. The band toured extensively and released one album, Burned, in 1995. After a few singles and more touring, the band began to play a large number of old Echo & the Bunnymen songs at their shows. In 1996, the Bunnymen reformed.

Sergeant also returned to solo work in 1997, under the moniker Glide, producing experimental, ambient and psychedelic instrumental music based around keyboard and electronic sounds. That year, he released the live Space Age Freak Out, followed by another live album, Performance, in 2000. Glide began to tour, and would often open for Echo & the Bunnymen in the early 2000s. Glide released Curvature of the Earth in 2004.

Sergeant has guested on Primal Scream's "When the Bombs Drop" (2006) and Baltic Fleet's self-titled debut album (2008). He has also played a role in English supergroup The Serpents' only studio album, You Have Just Been Poisoned By.

In 2013, Will Sergeant and Les Pattinson, ex-bass player with Echo & the Bunnymen, formed "Poltergeist" with former Black Velvets drummer Nick Kilroe. They have been playing live and released an album called Your Mind Is A Box (Let Us Fill It With Wonder) in June 2013. Sergeant told journalist Jon Cronshaw that: "We don't want to have to stick to the verse-chorus-verse format, because that's what we have to do in the Bunnymen. We're trying to do something that's a bit different, and a bit more open-ended. We can do anything with this project because we're not governed by any preconceptions about what people expect. If we wanted, we could do a 40-minute ambient nose flute solo if we really wanted, you know? I just like that aspect that we can take it anywhere."

In 2021, he published Bunnyman, the first part of his autobiography covering his childhood and the formation of Echo and the Bunnymen up until just before they replaced the drum machine with Pete de Freitas. The second part, Echoes was published in 2023.

== Personal life ==
Sergeant was raised in Melling with a brother and sister.

== Equipment ==
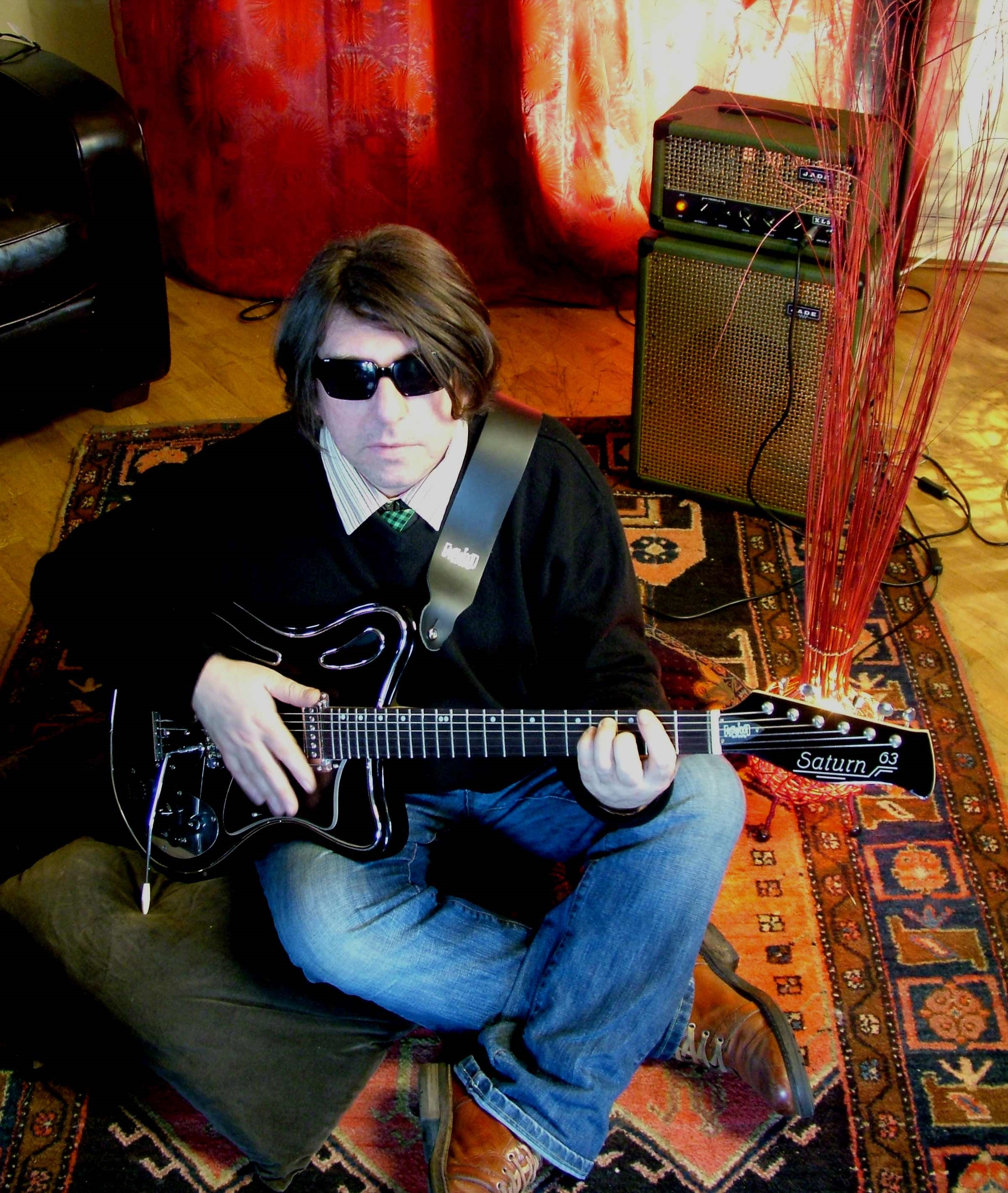
Sergeant with an Eastwood Saturn '63 in 1992

During most of his time with the Bunnymen in the 1980s, Sergeant used a black Fender Telecaster with much reverb and delay. This gave the Bunnymen sound a clear, cutting tone. On several occasions during the 1980s Sergeant would use a Fender Jaguar guitar. He used a Fender Stratocaster to a great extent on the 1987 Echo & the Bunnymen album. In the music video for "Lips Like Sugar," he can be seen playing a vintage Hagström Deluxe 90, (possibly a prop since the performance is lip-synched to the studio track). When the Bunnymen reformed in 1997 he started using his Jaguar as his main instrument with a lot of tremolo. He also uses a Vox 12 string guitar.

== Discography ==
=== With Echo & the Bunnymen ===
See: Echo & the Bunnymen discography

=== With Electrafixion ===
See: Electrafixion#Discography

=== As Glide ===
- Space Age Freak Out (1997)
- Performance (2000)
- Curvature of the Earth (2004, Cooking Vinyl)
- Assemblage 1 & 2 (2014, 92 Happy Customers)
- Assemblage Three & Four (2023, AV8 Records Ltd)

=== With Poltergeist ===
- Your Mind is a Box (Let Us Fill It With Wonder) (2013)

=== Solo ===
==== Albums ====
- Weird as Fish (1978)
- Themes for Grind (1982), 92 Happy Customers – UK Indie No. 6
- Weird As Fish/Le Via Luonge (2003), Ochre
- Things Inside (2012), 92 Happy Customers

==== Singles ====
- "Favourite Branches" (1982), Warner Music Group
- "Cosmos" (1995), Ochre
- "You Have Just Been Poisoned by the Serpents" (1998), Ochre
- Themes from Grind: Remixes (2000), Ochre
