= Ian McCulloch (singer) =

English singer-songwriter and musician (born 1959)

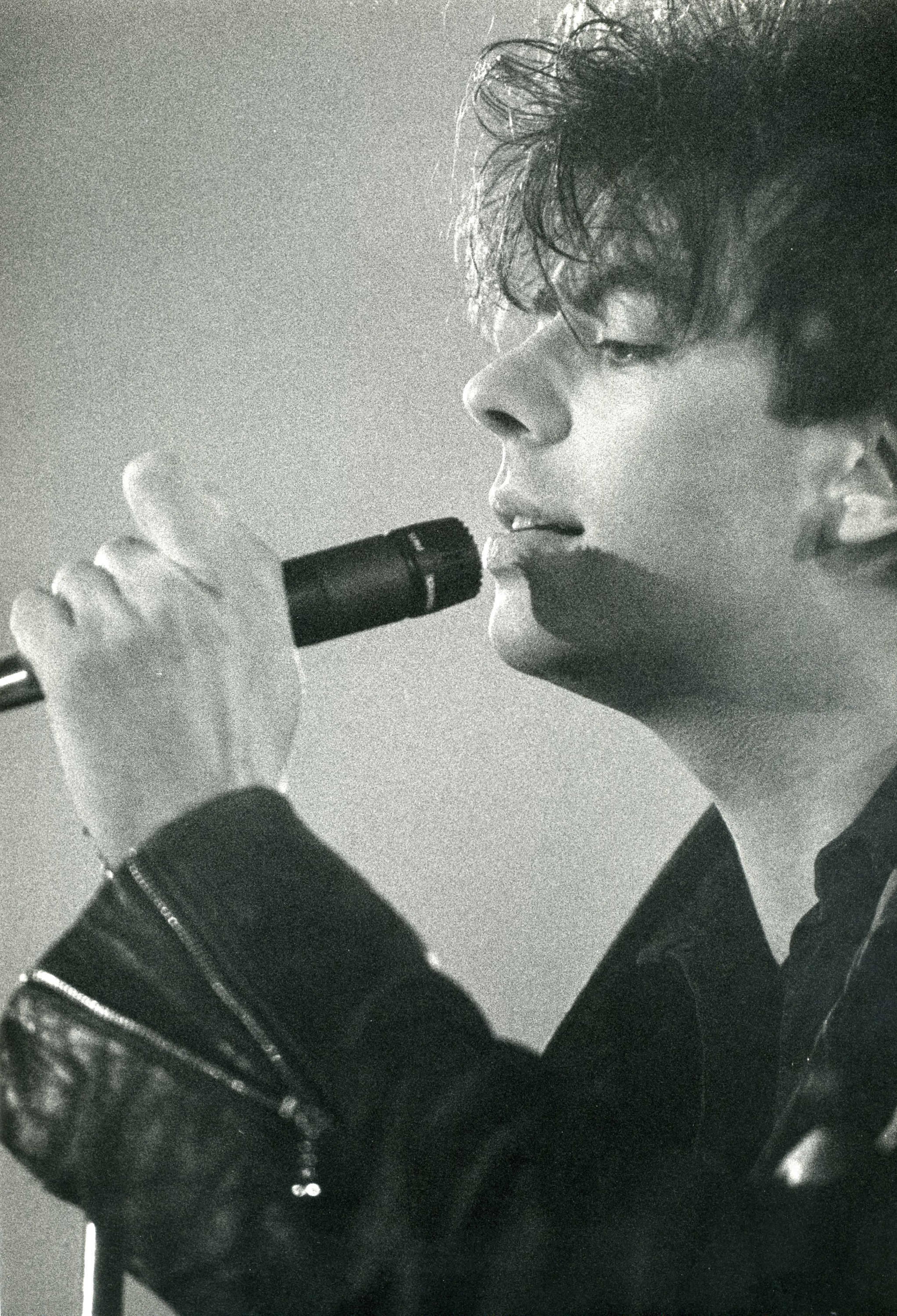
- McCulloch in 1988

Background information
- Born: Ian Stephen McCulloch; 5 May 1959 (age 67), Liverpool, England
- Genres: Post-punk; new wave; neo-psychedelia; alternative rock
- Occupations: Musician, singer-songwriter
- Instruments: Vocals; guitar; bass guitar; keyboards; percussion
- Years active: 1977–present
- Labels: Zoo; Korova; Warner Bros.; Sire; London; Cooking Vinyl
- Member of: Echo & the Bunnymen
- Formerly of: Electrafixion; Crucial Three; A Shallow Madness; Uh
- Website: ianmcculloch.info

Ian Stephen McCulloch (born 5 May 1959) is an English singer-songwriter and musician, best known as the lead singer of the rock band Echo & the Bunnymen.

== Career ==
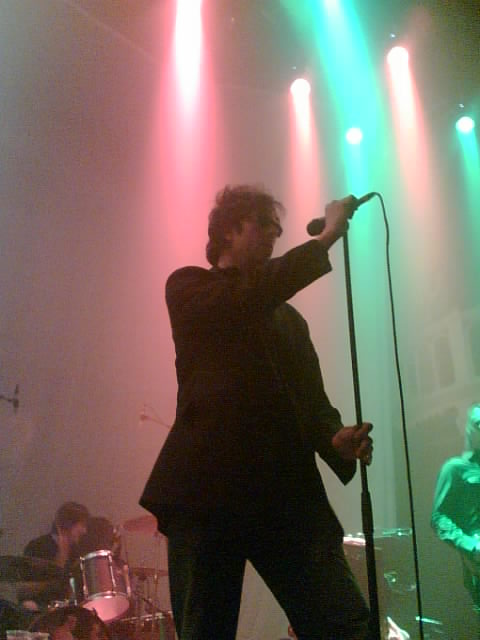
McCulloch performing in Amsterdam, Netherlands, 2006

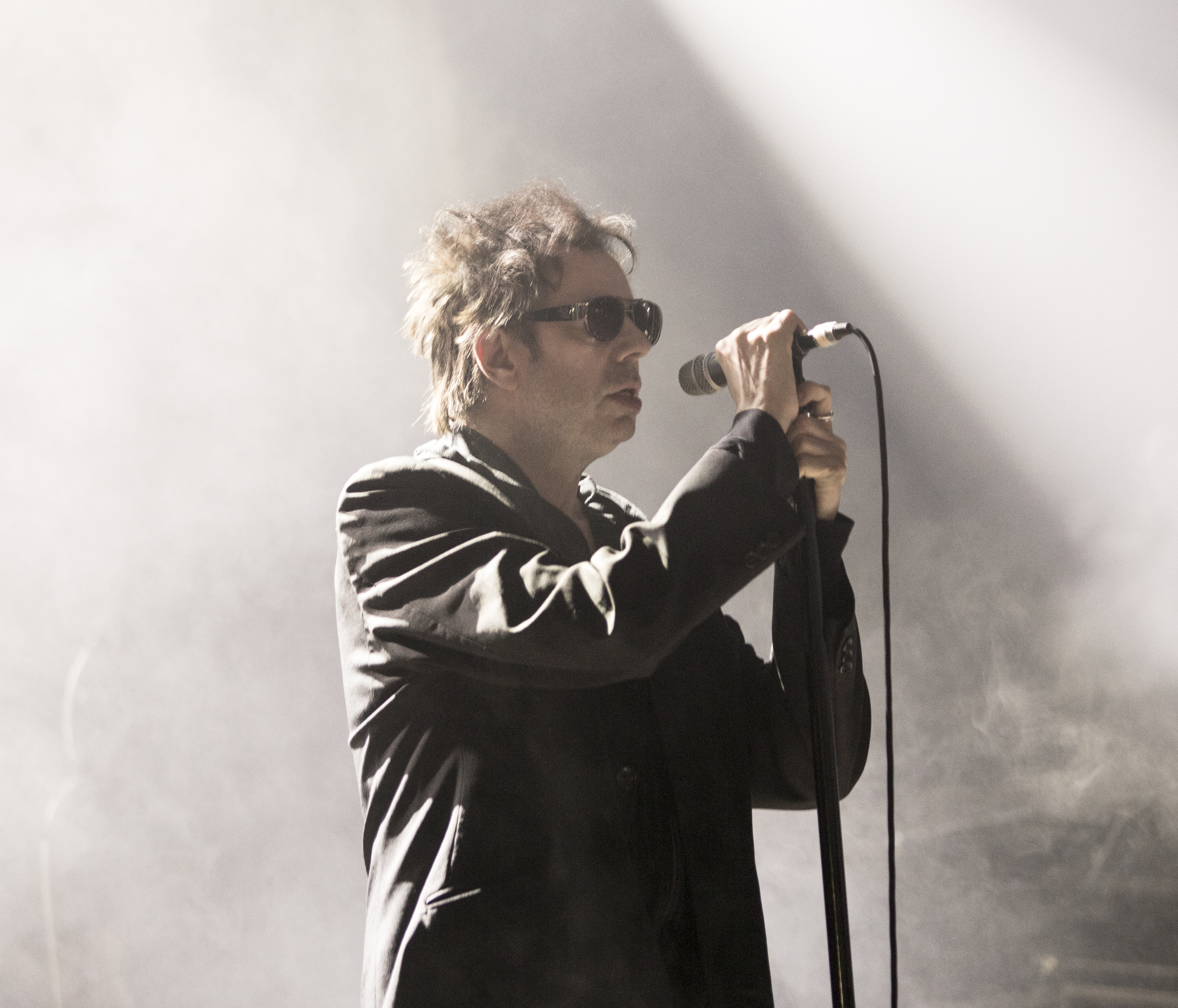
McCulloch with Echo & the Bunnymen at the Festival Internacional de Benicàssim 2016

McCulloch was a singer-songwriter with the Crucial Three, one of many local bands that sprang up amongst the regulars who patronised a Liverpool club called Eric's in the late 1970s. The other two members were Julian Cope and Pete Wylie who went on to form Wah!. The band existed between May and June 1977, and never got beyond rehearsals. In July 1978, along with future members of the Teardrop Explodes – Cope, Mick Finkler and Paul Simpson – and drummer Dave Pickett, McCulloch formed A Shallow Madness. Again the band did not perform or record, but an acoustic version of the band, under the name Uh, played live twice. The band broke up in September 1978.

In October 1978, McCulloch founded Echo & the Bunnymen with Will Sergeant (lead guitar), Les Pattinson (bass), and a drum machine (allegedly named Echo), making their live debut at Eric's in November that year. In October 1979, the Bunnymen exchanged the drum machine for Pete de Freitas on drums. With their line-up solidified, the Bunnymen played in the late 1970s and early 1980s, releasing their critically praised debut studio album, Crocodiles in 1980, and the heavier, bass-driven Heaven Up Here in 1981. They released their third studio album Porcupine in 1983 with the lead single "The Cutter" finishing in the top 10 of the UK Singles Chart. Ocean Rain followed in 1984. Shortly before the album was released, McCulloch described Ocean Rain as "the greatest album ever made." McCulloch later said: "When I sing 'The Killing Moon' I know there isn't a band in the world who's got a song anywhere near that."

In 1988, McCulloch left the group to pursue a solo career under the impression that the Bunnymen would be laid to rest, if only temporarily. When the remaining Bunnymen continued using the name with new lead vocalist Noel Burke, the break-up became more permanent with McCulloch referring to the band as "Echo & the Bogusmen".

In 1989, McCulloch released his debut solo studio album Candleland which reflected a more mature outlook on the world, owing to the recent deaths of McCulloch's father and Pete de Freitas, and peaked at number 18 on the UK Albums Chart. It yielded two Modern Rock Tracks hits, "Proud to Fall" (No. 1 for 4 weeks) and "Faith and Healing". McCulloch's second solo album Mysterio was released in 1992 as the public's interest in the former Bunnyman was waning and sold less than its predecessor. Shortly after, McCulloch left the public eye to devote more time to his family.

In 1993, McCulloch partnered with Johnny Marr of the Smiths, writing an album's worth of material. McCulloch has credited Marr with helping him regain his lost confidence and rejuvenating his desire to create music. When it was suggested that Will Sergeant be brought in to work on the songs, the tapes were allegedly stolen from a courier van preventing Sergeant from offering any input.

The rekindling of the relationship between McCulloch and Sergeant led to the formation of the alternative rock band Electrafixion in 1994. They released their debut and sole studio album Burned which peaked at number 38 in the UK and included the top-30 hit "Sister Pain". The band soon found themselves performing set lists composed of half Electrafixion songs and half Echo & the Bunnymen songs.

In 1997, Echo & the Bunnymen reformed and released their seventh studio album Evergreen to positive reviews and chart success. Evergreen made the top 10 of the UK Albums Chart and the single "Nothing Lasts Forever" reached No. 8 on the UK Singles Chart. The reformed Bunnymen have since recorded several further albums, the most recent being The Stars, the Oceans & the Moon which was released in 2018.

At the height of the Bunnymen's popularity, McCulloch earned the nickname "Mac the Mouth" due to a penchant for witty, blunt criticism of artists he deemed inferior, while proclaiming the Bunnymen's superiority. Targets of his observations included Bono of U2 and Julian Cope. More recently, in 2011, McCulloch said of Bono: "Had he been in Liverpool, he would have been laughed out of the place. U2 have never been liked in Liverpool. We know a fake when we see one." McCulloch said that during the early 1980s, Bono told him the Bunnymen could break America but only if they toured there for three months. McCulloch said: "Three months? I can't spend three minutes in Birkenhead without going daft, let alone America."

In 1998, McCulloch teamed up with Johnny Marr, the Spice Girls, Tommy Scott of Space, and Simon Fowler of Ocean Colour Scene as England United to record "(How Does It Feel to Be) On Top of the World", the official song for Team England in the 1998 FIFA World Cup. It was overshadowed however by "Three Lions 98" and "Vindaloo". He enjoyed more success working as a mentor for Coldplay during the recording of their second studio album A Rush of Blood to the Head (2002).

In 2003, McCulloch released his third solo album Slideling and undertook a solo tour in support of the album.

McCulloch has been a lifetime supporter of Liverpool F.C. In 2006, he took part in recording the team's anthem with the Bootroom Allstars – a cover version of the Johnny Cash song "Ring of Fire", and was on the judging panel for the music competition Pringles Unsung.

In 2010, McCulloch featured in a guest role on the song "Some Kind of Nothingness" by the Manic Street Preachers from their tenth album Postcards from a Young Man.

In 2012, McCulloch released his fourth studio album, Pro Patria Mori, as well as the live album Holy Ghosts in 2013.

In April 2017, following news of a possible armed conflict between the United States and North Korea, McCulloch canceled a concert in Tokyo, Japan moments before showtime by leaving Japan without notifying the concert promoter.

In October 2017, McCulloch featured on the Norwegian band a-ha's acoustic live album MTV Unplugged: Summer Solstice, singing "Scoundrel Days" and "The Killing Moon". The performance was recorded at Giske island in Norway in June 2017.

== Musical influences ==
McCulloch has cited Lou Reed, Iggy Pop, the Doors, Leonard Cohen and particularly David Bowie as influences for his work. He has described Cohen's 1968 song "Suzanne" as "the perfect lyric with the perfect melody" and Bowie as "so influential and the greatest solo artist of the 20th Century in any walk of art."

== Personal life ==
McCulloch was brought up in the Norris Green area of Liverpool. McCulloch's father was a compulsive gambler. The road on which he originally lived, Parthenon Drive, is the title of a song contained on Echo & the Bunnymen's tenth studio album, Siberia (2005). He attended Alsop Comprehensive School.

As a child, McCulloch was diagnosed with obsessive–compulsive disorder (OCD). McCulloch also suffers from severe myopia and wears prescription sunglasses.

In 1983, McCulloch married Lorraine Fox. They have two daughters, Candy and Mimi. Candy appeared in the video for his solo single "Faith and Healing" when she was a young girl. The couple separated in late 2003.

In 2006, he was prosecuted in Scotland in relation to allegations of assaulting two fans at one of his concerts. McCulloch insisted that the fans had become belligerent towards him. He was cleared of the assault after a trial at a minor crimes court but convicted of a lesser charge of breach of the peace.

McCulloch was in a relationship with singer-songwriter Zoe Devlin, formerly of Alabama 3. They had a daughter, Dusty May. McCulloch and Devlin separated in 2013.

McCulloch was featured in a YouTube video appeal in October 2010 which campaigned for Tom Hicks and George Gillett to be removed from Liverpool F.C. In a 2013 interview, McCulloch said that he was no longer attending Liverpool matches.

== Discography ==
Studio albums

- Candleland (1989)
- Mysterio (1992)
- Slideling (2003)
- Pro Patria Mori (2012)

Live albums

- Liverpool Cathedral Live (2012)
- Holy Ghosts (2013)
