= Pete de Freitas =

English musician and producer (1961–89)

- De Freitas in 1985

Background information
- Born: Peter Louis Vincent de Freitas; 2 August 1961; Port of Spain, Trinidad and Tobago
- Died: 14 June 1989 (aged 27) Longdon Green, England
- Genres: Post-punk; alternative rock
- Occupation: Musician
- Instruments: Drums; percussion
- Years active: 1979–1989
- Formerly of: Echo & the Bunnymen; The Wild Swans; The Sex Gods

Peter Louis Vincent de Freitas (2 August 1961 – 14 June 1989) was an English musician and producer. He was the drummer in Echo & the Bunnymen, and performed on their first five albums.

== Career ==
De Freitas joined the Bunnymen in 1979, replacing a drum machine. Bunnymen's singer Ian McCulloch said they told him "to get stuck into the toms. Budgie, of the musical group Siouxsie and the Banshees, was the only other drummer doing that stuff at the time and Pete loved his drumming".

He funded, produced, and played drums under the name Louis Vincent on the first single of the Wild Swans, "The Revolutionary Spirit", in 1982, for the Zoo Records label.

In 1985, de Freitas temporarily left the band. He spent several months drinking in New Orleans, while attempting to form a new group, the Sex Gods. By 1987, he returned to the Bunnymen to record their fifth album, though only as a part-time member. He was married in the same year and his daughter Lucie Marie was born in 1988.

== Death ==
De Freitas died in a motorcycle accident in 1989 at the age of 27, on his way to Liverpool from London. He was riding a 900cc Ducati motorcycle on the A51 road in Longdon Green, Staffordshire when he collided with a motor vehicle at approximately 16:00. His ashes are buried at Whitehill Burial Ground in Goring-on-Thames.

== Personal life ==
De Freitas was born in Port of Spain, Trinidad and Tobago, and educated by the Benedictines at Downside School in Somerset, south-west England. His father, Denis, was a copyright lawyer. His sisters Rose and Rachel were founding members of the band The Heart Throbs. His brother Frank is the bass player of the Woodentops.

== See also ==
- 27 Club
- The Colourfield
- The Wild Swans
