= Korova (record label) =

UK record label

Korova was a British record label, named after the fictitious Korova Milk Bar that was featured in the film A Clockwork Orange, 'korova' (корова) also being the Russian word for 'cow'. The imprint was founded in London, England in 1979 as a division of Warner Communications' WEA (Warner-Elektra-Atlantic) record company. Korova's first album release was Echo & the Bunnymen's debut album Crocodiles, with Zoo Records' Bill Drummond and David Balfe closely involved in the project.

The label was originally active during the early to mid-1980s, not only releasing recordings by Echo & the Bunnymen, but also records by the Sound, Guns for Hire, Dalek I Love You, Tenpole Tudor, Ellery Bop and Strawberry Switchblade (like Echo & the Bunnymen, also management clients of Balfe). Korova also released a couple of singles by Drummond and Balfe's band with Lori Lartey called Lori & the Chameleons and put out a few UK releases from the Residents catalogue, as well as American artist Jeff Finlin's Angel in Disguise, with the single "American Dream #109". However, by the time Echo & the Bunnymen released their self-titled 1987 album, the label/brand had been dropped, with the album being released on the main WEA label.

In the 1990s, the label was re-activated by WEA for new indie-dance acts such as (Jefferson) Airhead, with the label used again by Warner Music Group in 2003 to issue the 25th anniversary remastered editions of Echo and the Bunnymen's first six LPs. At this point, WMG decided to use the label again for a number of indie acts in the mid-2000s, such as Cosmic Rough Riders and the Storys, but the company had collapsed by 2007.

== See also ==
- List of record labels
