= Ken Testi =

British entrepreneur

Ken Testi is British entrepreneur most notable for his involvement with the bands Queen and Deaf School and with the Liverpool music venue Eric's Club.

== Biography ==
In the mid-1960s whilst at school, Testi began promoting shows in venues as diverse as scout huts, youth clubs, schools, pubs and civic halls. In the summer of 1969, with a band formed at school, he went to London where he met Freddie Bulsara. A few weeks later Bulsara appeared on stage for the first time, fronting the band Testi had taken to London. Bulsara changed the band's name from Ibex to Wreckage and later changed his own name to Freddie Mercury.

During 1970, as a college social secretary, Testi continued to follow Mercury's progress with Roger Taylor and Brian May in the newly formed Queen and arranged three shows for the band; at a youth club in Potters Bar, at St Helens College of Technology and at Liverpool's Cavern Club. Testi returned to London and spent 1971 encouraging Queen and generating interest from record companies.

In mid-1972 Testi returned to Merseyside, working with local musicians until 1974 when he met members of a band from Liverpool College of Art who had taken their name from the building where they rehearsed – Deaf School. Deaf School became the spark that ignited a creative, musical explosion in Liverpool which had seen scant original musical output since The Beatles.

During two years of tour management with Deaf School, Testi formed an alliance with Roger Eagle. The two first met in the 1960s at the Magic Village in Manchester. Together they established Eric's Club in Mathew Street, Liverpool in 1976. The first band to play was Deaf School, followed by many of the leading acts of the day: The Stranglers, The Runaways, The Sex Pistols, The Damned, Elvis Costello, The Police, Ian Dury and the Blockheads, Nick Lowe, Dave Edmunds, The Clash, The Ramones and Talking Heads, amongst others.

Before it closed in March 1980, many new local acts had been encouraged to take to the stage for the first time including Jayne Casey, Bill Drummond, Ian Broudie and Holly Johnson (Big in Japan), Paul Rutherford and Budgie (The Spitfire Boys) and Pete Wylie. In the 1980s, the UK and international record charts were dominated by talent that had emerged from Eric's including, Frankie Goes to Hollywood, KLF, The Lightning Seeds, The Teardrop Explodes, Echo & the Bunnymen and Dead or Alive.

In 1988 Testi persuaded Deaf School to reform for a series of shows, from which Clive Langer produced a live album, 2nd Coming: Liverpool '88. In 2008 Testi produced an Eric's Show at Liverpool Academy featuring acts from the club. In the same year Liverpool's Everyman Theatre produced “Eric’s, The Musical”.

Testi currently runs a company called Eric's Productions Limited, where he produces a number of shows each year for Deaf School, and their celebrity guests who regularly include Suggs and Lee Thompson (Madness), Kevin Rowland (Dexys Midnight Runners) and Ian Broudie (Lightning Seeds).
