= British Refugee =

Single by The Spitfire Boys
- A-side: "British Refugee"
- B-side: "Mein Kampf"
- Released: 7 October 1977 (UK); June 1978 (Germany)
- Genre: Punk rock
- Label: RKO Records
- Producer(s): Barry Kingston

The Spitfire Boys singles chronology
"British Refugee" (1977)	"Funtime" (1979)

"British Refugee" is the debut single released by the 1970s Liverpool punk rock band the Spitfire Boys, on RKO Records on 7 October 1977. It was the only disc released by this line-up, who comprised vocalist Paul Rutherford, guitarist David Littler, bassist Pete Griffiths and drummer Peter Clarke. At the time, they were one of the few punk bands from Merseyside who released a record, apart from Big in Japan and Chuddy Nuddies (later known as Yachts). Two months after its release, the band split up, but was reformed in Wales by 1979 by David Littler along with other ex-Nylonz members.

Paul Rutherford formed 1980s pop band Frankie Goes to Hollywood and Peter Clarke became known as Budgie and joined Big in Japan, Slits, and Siouxsie and the Banshees, later marrying Siouxsie Sioux in 1991.

The original version of the single was originally issued without a picture sleeve, but it was later added for the German edition in 1978.

The 'A'-side of the single, opening with the line 'He came from Northern Ireland with hate in his heart', describes the life of a Northern Irish immigrant in England who escaped from the British occupation of his country, and lived in poor working-class conditions.

For the single each member was credited with nickname or stage name, so Rutherford was named as Maggot, Littler as Jones, Griffiths as Zero, and Clarke as Blister.

== Track list ==
=== A-side ===
1. "British Refugee"

=== B-side ===
1. "Mein Kampf"

== Personnel ==
- Maggot: vocals
- Jones: guitar
- Zero: bass
- Blister: drums
