= Brutality, Religion and a Dance Beat =

Single by Big in Japan and Yachts

Single by Big in Japan and the Chuddy Nuddies
- A-side: "Big in Japan" by Big in Japan
- B-side: "Do the Chud" by The Chuddy Nuddies
- Released: September 1977
- Recorded: 1977
- Genre: Punk rock, power pop, new wave
- Label: Eric's

Big in Japan singles chronology
| "Brutality, Religion and a Dance Beat" (1977) | "From Y to Z and Never Again" (1978) |

"Brutality, Religion and a Dance Beat" is a 7" split single of two songs. It contains the songs "Big in Japan", by eponymous band Big in Japan, and "Do the Chud", by the Chuddy Nuddies (later Yachts), both groups formed in the 1970s punk scene of Liverpool. It was released by the Eric's label in November 1977.

The side-A song, "Big in Japan", is an eponymous song of the band Big in Japan. It is a power pop/punk oriented song, in which the singer, Jayne Casey, sings only the song's title, plus a chorus. The band comprised future and past successful musicians Jayne Casey, guitarists Bill Drummond (later with the KLF), Ian Broudie (later of Care and the Lightning Seeds) and Clive Langer (of Deaf School), bassist Kev Ward and drummer Phil Allen.

The side-B song is "Do the Chud" by the Chuddy Nuddies, which later changed their name to Yachts. The song is synthpop oriented.

== Track listing ==
Side A
| No. | Title | Artist | Length |
|---|---|---|---|
| 1. | ""Big in Japan"" | Big in Japan |

Side B
| No. | Title | Artist | Length |
|---|---|---|---|
| 1. | "Do the Chud" | The Chuddy Nuddies |

== Personnel ==
=== Big in Japan ===
- Jayne Casey – lead vocals
- Bill Drummond– guitar
- Ian Broudie – guitar
- Clive Langer – guitar
- Kev Ward – bass
- Phil Allen – drums

=== The Chuddy Nuddies ===
- Bob Bellis
- Henry Priestman
- Martin Dempsey
- Martin Watson
