= Ambrose Reynolds =

English musician and artist

- Also known as: Ambrose
- Born: 12 June 1960 (age 65)
- Origin: Merseyside, England
- Genres: New wave; synth-pop; punk rock; post-punk
- Occupation: Musician
- Instrument: Bass guitar
- Years active: 1976–1990s
- Formerly of: The O'Boogie Brothers; Big in Japan; Ded Byrds; Pink Industry; Urban Strawberry Lunch

Ambrose Reynolds (born 12 June 1960; also credited as Ambrose) is an English musician and artist who formed part of the 1970s and 1980s musical scene in Liverpool, playing bass in various bands.

== Biography ==
Reynolds began making music as a chorister at Liverpool Cathedral at the age of 7. A few years later, he teamed up with David Knopov in a street busking band called The O'Boogie Brothers. The O'Boogie Brothers expanded its membership to include Ian Broudie on guitar and Nathan McGough (later to manage the Happy Mondays). With a new 6 piece line-up, they became a proper band after supporting legendary Liverpool band Deaf School on Christmas Eve 1976 at Eric's Club, Mathew St, Liverpool. The O'Boogie Brothers eventually split in 1977. After a short stint playing with various Liverpool bands including the infamous Big in Japan with Jayne Casey and Ian Broudie, Reynolds teamed up with David Knopov to put a new band together.

In late 1977, Reynolds and Knopov formed a new band, Ded Byrds, a kind of cabaret punk band featuring Denyse D'arcy (sax & vocals), Dave Wibberley (guitar), Wayne Hussey (guitar) and Jon Moss (drums), with Knopov on vocals. Ded Byrds were hugely successful in the new wave band scene, playing regularly at Eric's Liverpool and The Factory (at the Russell Club), Manchester. Ded Byrds were spotted supporting The Pretenders by Sire Records boss, Seymour Stein who signed them on the spot to a five-year record contract on the proviso that the band changed its name. In June 1979, Walkie Talkies released one single, "Rich and Nasty" b/w "Summertime in Russia". The band split in November of that year.

In the 1980s, Reynolds was still tied to Sire Records and unable to start a new project so he worked with a close succession of other Liverpool groups. He played with and produced in the Pete Burns band Nightmares in Wax, recording one single "Black Leather", and worked with Factory Records to produce the single "We Love the Moon" and an album, The Project, with The Royal Family and the Poor.

In 1980, Reynolds formed a new band, Frankie Goes to Hollywood, with Holly Johnson, BF Tin and Steve Lovell. The name is a matter of contention; Johnson wanted to call the band Hollycaust, Reynolds disagreed, Johnson responded "we could call it anything"; his eyes then drifted to a poster on the wall of Frank Sinatra (from a book called Rock Dreams) as he read out the caption, saying disparagingly, "we could even call it Frankie goes to Hollywood, it doesn't matter", at which point Reynolds said, "yes, that's what we should call it, it's original and different". The band split up soon after that, and Reynolds continued to work under that name until 1981, when Johnson began using the name for his more successful band of the same name a few years later.

Reynolds teamed up again with Jayne Casey, to form an experimental electronic pop group Pink Industry. Reynolds and Casey also formed their own record company, Zulu Records, releasing many records between 1981 and 1985. Pink Industry released Fort-Five EP (1981), Low Technology (1982), Who Told You You Were Naked? (1982), What I Wouldn't Give EP (1983), New Beginnings (1984), Cruel Garden EP (1984), and Don't Let Go (1985, produced by Ian Broudie).

Reynolds' Zulu label also released The Zulu Compilation in 1984, featuring an early version of Frankie Goes to Hollywood's "Wish (The Lads Were Here)" (entitled "Love Has Got a Gun") and Reynolds' solo album Greatest Hits, an album of famous political speeches and assassinations from the mid-1960s set to music. In 1985, Pink Industry split up and Reynolds began working in theatre music, touring Europe with various shows.

In 1987, Reynolds formed Urban Strawberry Lunch with BF Tin, specializing in making and playing music on recycled materials. Urban Strawberry Lunch have gone through many line-up changes but Reynolds is still active in the band.

Between 2003 and 2014, Reynolds and Urban Strawberry Lunch worked in Liverpool's "bombed out church", St. Luke's, regenerating the ruined building through the arts, presenting music, exhibitions, poetry, dance, outdoor film screenings and weddings.

Reynolds is married with one daughter.
