= The Royal Family and the Poor =

English rock band

- Origin: Liverpool, England
- Genres: Post-punk, new wave, electronica
- Years active: 1978–present
- Labels: Factory Records, Project Tapes, Gaia Communications, Boutique, Gothic Moon Records
- Members: Mike Keane
- Past members: Arthur McDonald; Nathan McGough; Ambrose Reynolds; Jeff Turner; Karen Halewood; John Walsh; Phil Hurst; Kif; Simon Crab; Andy Frizell; Merlin Shepherd

The Royal Family and the Poor are an English rock band from Liverpool, England. After recording two singles and two albums for Factory Records in the 1980s, they continued to release music into the 21st century.

== History ==
The band was formed in 1978 by Mika Keane, who played guitar, bass guitar, synthesizer, piano, and percussion, and also programmed drum machines. The band also included members of Liverpool's Situationist Youth Collective, including Nathan McGough and art graduate Arthur McDonald. In his book Shadowplayers, James Nice describes the band as "less of a group than a pseudo-Situationist provocation". Initially, the band's music consisted of McDonald's Situationist lyrics over Keane's synthesizer played through a record player. A crudely recorded demo tape recorded in 1979 resulted in Tony Wilson signing them to his Factory label. It was Wilson who gave the band their name, taken from Fred and Judy Vermorel's book Sex Pistols, the Inside Story. Their first release was as part of A Factory Quartet, providing six tracks produced by Martin Hannett on the compilation double album, shared with the Durutti Column, Kevin Hewick, and Blurt. Released in December 1980, it featured six tracks by the band. Their debut EP, Art - Dream - Dominion, the last record produced for Factory by Donald Johnson (Art) and BeMusic (Dream, Dominion), was released in February 1982.

McGough left to join the Pale Fountains, later becoming the manager of Happy Mondays. The band's original line-up disbanded, and Keane toured in support of China Crisis under the name the Legend Agency, playing over backing tapes. He recorded tracks intended for released as the Legend Agency with Matt Johnson, but they were not released. Keane struggled with heroin addiction, and took a break from music, walking what he described as a "pilgrimage" on the Pilgrim's Way to Canterbury. He returned to record for Factory in 1983, on what would be released the following year as the occult-themed album The Project Phase 1 – The Temple of the 13th Tribe, produced by Peter Hook and featuring Lita Hara of Stockholm Monsters and Jon Neesam (of Walkingseeds). A second album, The Project – Phase 2 – We Love the Moon, was released in 1986, accompanied by a single, "We Love the Moon". The band then moved to Keane's own Gaia Communications label, continuing their occult-themed and more electronic-oriented music on several further albums, including In the Sea of E (1987), Songs for the Children of Baphomet (2001) and North-West Soul (2004), with Keane the only constant member. In 2010, McDonald reemerged to self-release an album titled The Pope's Daughter, though Keane was not involved.

Other members at various times included bassist Ambrose Reynolds (who had previously played in Liverpool bands such as Big in Japan, Hollycaust, Nightmares in Wax and Walkie Talkies, and was also a member of Pink Industry), Jeff Turner (saxophone, clarinet, guitar, violin), Karen Halewood (synthesizer, vocals), John Walsh (bass guitar), Phil Hurst (drums) and Kif (drums).

== Discography ==
=== Studio albums ===
- The Project Phase 1 – The Temple of the 13th Tribe (1984, Factory Records)
- The Project – Phase 2 – We Love the Moon (1986, Factory Records)
- The Genetic Terrorists (1986, Project Tapes)
- In the Sea of E (1987, Gaia Communications)
- Songs for the Children of Baphomet (2001, Gaia Communications)
- North-West Soul (2004, Boutique)
- The Pope's Daughter (2010, Gothic Moon Records)
- Haunted with Teresa Kelly (2012, Gothic Moon Records)

=== Live albums ===
- Live 1983–1985 (1986, Recloose Organisation)

=== Compilation albums ===
- Anthology 1978 – 2001 (2001, Gaia Communications)
- The Project Phase 5 – Portuguese Radio Show – October 1988 (2003, Boutique)

=== Singles and EPs ===
- Art - Dream - Dominion 12" EP (1982, Factory Records)
- "We Love the Moon" 7" single (1986, Factory Records)
- The Project - Phase 4 12" EP (1988, Gaia Communications)

=== Compilation appearances ===
- "Dirge", "Vaneigem Mix", "Dirge", "Death Factory", "Dirge" and "Rackets" on A Factory Quartet (1980, Factory Records)
