= Urban Strawberry Lunch =

Urban Strawberry Lunch (USL) were an English, Liverpool based group and Community Arts organisation, who made music on everyday objects. Formed by Benjamin F Tin and Ambrose Reynolds in 1987, USL began making their own musical instruments after a fire destroyed all of their (uninsured) musical instruments. Among other activities, they are known for their performances and music festivals hosted within Liverpool's landmark "bombed-out church", the Church of St Luke, Liverpool.

Benjamin F Tin (1959-2020) and Ambrose Reynolds first worked together in the Liverpool postpunk bands Nightmares in Wax and Pink Industry. Tin moved to Brighton where, in 1986, he formed Urban Warriors, a 'junkpercussion duo' with Luke Cresswell. Cresswell later said, "Two of us would do street work, beating the hell out of each other with sticks and armour made out of bits of metal." After the duo split, Cresswell went on to found Stomp. Tin then reunited with Reynolds, forming Urban Strawberry Lunch.

Urban Strawberry Lunch disbanded in 2014, announcing, 'After 27 years of musical education for groups with little or no access to traditional instruments, concerts, events and arts installations we are very sad to bring an end to activities.'

Founder member Ambrose Reynolds continues his work at St Luke's Church, Liverpool and occasional music workshops using the remnants of USL musical instruments.

USL operated in three interrelated areas:

- Composing, performing and recording
- Making instruments and sound sculptures
- Learning and community projects
