= Song (It's Immaterial album) =

Studio album by It's Immaterial
- Released: June 1990
- Recorded: 1988–1989
- Studio: Castlesound, Pencaitland, Scotland
- Genre: Synth-pop; electronica; art rock; indie; experimental
- Length: 52:28
- Label: Siren
- Producer: Calum Malcolm

It's Immaterial chronology
Life's Hard and Then You Die (1986)	Song (1990)	House for Sale (2020)

Singles from Song
- 1. "Heaven Knows" Released: 1990

Song is the second album by English pop act It's Immaterial, released in June 1990 by Siren Records. Reduced to a duo of John Campbell and Jarvis Whitehead, It's Immaterial recorded the album with producer Calum Malcolm in his Castlesound studios in Pencaitland, Scotland, having chosen him for his keyboard skills and work with the Blue Nile. With Malcolm, the duo spent a lengthy time recording the record with meticulous sessions that incorporated extensive homemade sampling, including some samples recorded outdoors.

The album features a synthesized, evocative sound with flowing, repetitive musical patterns, and songs which ignored traditional song structures by forgoing choruses. Campbell's story-like lyrics feature an English feel with their suburban settings and references to people and place names he knew in the North of England. Promoted by the single "Heaven Knows", Song was a commercial failure with its experimental style out of step with the popular music of its time. However, it was hailed by critics for its unique, adventurous style and clever lyrics. The album was re-released by Cherry Red Records in 2009.

== Background ==
With their 1986 single "Driving Away from Home (Jim's Tune)", the Liverpool-based It's Immaterial had a UK Top 20 hit, while the album Life's Hard and Then You Die reached number 62 in the corresponding album chart. Following the release of further singles from their album, "Eds Funky Dinner" and "Space (He Called from the Kitchen)", the group left the public eye and downsized to a principal duo of John Campbell and Jarvis Whitehead. A planned tour with Les Rita Mitsouko was canceled following a fall out between the artists.

After touring Europe in support of Life's Hard, It's Immaterial returned to Britain in 1987 and began demoing material for Song in a small rehearsal studio fitted with a 16-track recorder. Ross Stapleton – an A&R worker at the duo's label Siren Records, owned by Virgin – felt from the duo's demos that they would find recording the album a struggle, especially given the group's previous moments of writer's block. The duo picked producer Calum Malcolm for Song based on his engineering of the Blue Nile's A Walk Across the Rooftops (1984); he accepted based on the duo's primitive song ideas alone, which Campbell described as "just a calling card: some chords and some words. They weren't songs. They were just, 'This is the kind of thing that we might like to explore.'" Though Stapleton felt Malcolm was "an inspired choice," he feared it would result in a "masterwork of brilliance" which would fail commercially after the group's more radio-friendly debut.

== Recording ==
In March 1988, the duo moved to East Lothian, Scotland to begin recording the album at Malcolm's Pencaitland countryside studio Castlesound, which he operated in a former schoolhouse. Malcolm "gradually dismantled" the duo's songs until, as Campbell says, "this whole new way of working revealed itself," with the producer adding atmospheric drones and arpeggios. He favored space and quietness in the production, and worked with the duo to create an album with "the required 'emotional hit'"; they also knew Siren Records would soon close, which Campbell believed due to Virgin owner Richard Branson being focused on his airline business, so saw the album as a chance to make one "that has everything about you in it." Recording in the Scottish countryside, Campbell felt the area contributed to the album's "very open and languid" sound, which he felt would have contrasted a more frenetic feel had the album been recorded in a city, and resultingly the duo and Malcolm generally worked in isolation, a departure from the "many different people" involved in Life's Hard.

One reason the duo chose Malcolm was his keyboard skills, which Whitehead described as "very subtle; every note he plays is designed to enhance the song. In that sense, he's very 'efficient'." As they had with their first album, the group used the Roland TR-808 drum machine but moved the acoustic piano further back into the mix. Song also features many samples, and excepting some sounds taken from the E-mu Emulator library, these were created by the band, including numerous recorded outside, on one instance traveling to the East Lothian coast to sample castanets in a cave. Rather than create digital reverb, Malcolm used natural reverb in a room at Castlesound, where he and the duo spent time experimenting with different instruments. The duo also used many percussive samples on Song, taken from a range of ethnic instruments left behind in the studio by the Blue Nile percussionist Nigel Thomas. Campbell felt aware that "there are certain traps you can fall into," so the duo used a variety of sounds to build up a sense of rhythm on the album's material, as opposed to "deliberately trying to find something different."

The duo spent months with Malcolm trying to create "a particular kind of tension" for the album; Campbell explained: "In a sense, it's a sort of controlled emotion; it's not quite letting go at any point. That's what was interesting to me at the time. You get the impression that something's just about to happen in the narrative, but it never quite does." By 1989, It's Immaterial had only completed one song and spent much time contemplating whether to create a long-form music video for Song, about which rumors spread in late 1989. Whitehead says: "There certainly wasn't any commercial success to speak of, we're just fortunate in having a rather gracious record company who allow us to work at our own pace." Campbell recalls that, when it came to writing the final song, the duo decided to "roll up our sleeves and write the single which we can use to sell the other nice songs." However, after a year of trying to achieve this, including changing the EQ of certain instruments on their recordings, they found this unsuccessful. He reflected: "We couldn't bear to go through with it. It isn't that we don't want to do anything commercial, it just doesn't seem to work for us."

== Composition ==
Unlike Life's Hard, which collected songs written since the band was formed, Song was conceived as a ten-song album. Stylistically, is characterised by Whitehead's flowing, repetitive musical patterns, largely based around piano, and Campbell's songs which are both sung and spoken. Considered by critic Dave Schulps to be "more a collection of stories put to music than actual songs," due to the absence of choruses, Song instead moves beyond the traditional pop song format and showcases introspective sounds, with an atmospheric, synth-heavy pop sound with "skimpy drumbeats, plinking pianos and pastel flourishes," according to critic Peter Kane. According to writer Colin Larkin, "the music was of a subdued, understated nature, with wry wit in the manner of an indie Pet Shop Boys." Musical influences on Song included Karlheinz Stockhausen, Philip Glass, Dead Can Dance, Talking Heads and OMD, while biographer Malcolm Dome noted elements of blues, country, folk and new wave styles within the album's "electronica pulse".

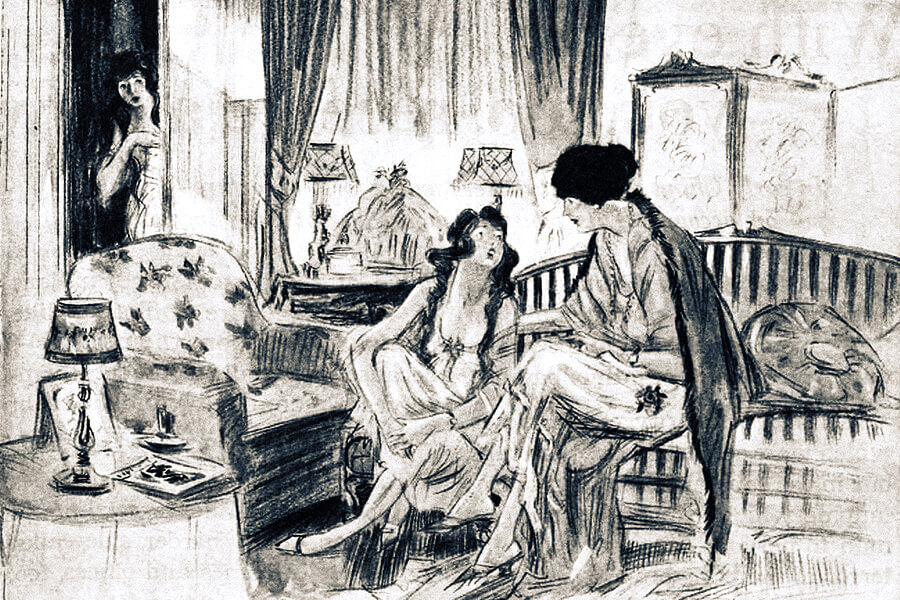
"An Ordinary Life" was inspired by the short story Bernice Bobs Her Hair (1920 illustration by May Wilson Preston depicted).

Campbell began writing the songs using expressions he had discovered and incorporated his own experiences around them. Many of the names in the songs refer to his friends, and the locations are largely real places he has visited, creating an "English feel" he felt was a natural reaction against Americanisms. According to journalist Penny Kiley, "a sense of place is strong in every song. Each song is a story and the Liverpool-based Mancunians have set them firmly in the North of England." Nigel Lord of Music Technology highlights the "underlying Englishness" that Song has in common with the first album, citing "a pre-occupation with suburbia, out-of-season holiday towns and drab Sunday afternoons - all traditional English themes." Wyndham Wallace of Classic Pop felt the songs to be poignant, sensitive portrayals of "the minutiae of Thatcher-era working-class life" and compared them to Shelagh Delaney.

"Endless Holiday" concerns a desperate, unemployed househusband, while "Heaven Knows" depicts a "financially overstretched suburban existence", according to Wallace. "An Ordinary Life", meanwhile, was inspired by the short story Bernice Bobs Her Hair (1920) by F. Scott Fitzgerald, and documents a lonely Mr. Hart's infatuation with a checkout girl named Bernice. "New Brighton" refers both to the town of that name and a 'frame of mind'; Campbell explained: "Everybody's going out and you're the stubborn one in a way because you quite like it. I like New Brighton, I wouldn't mind staying there." "Heaven Knows" was released as a double A-side single with the non-album song "River", backed with the B-side "Faith".

== Release and reception ==
Professional ratings
Review scores
Source	Rating
Q	4/5 stars
Select	2/5 stars

While the evocative, experimental nature of Song was not strictly commercial, It's Immaterial hoped the album would attract "the sort of people who make the effort to listen closely to music", according to journalist Penny Kiley. The duo planned to proceed with making the "long-form video" to accompany Song if the album was commercially successful. The album was released in June 1990 by Siren Records, in a sleeve featuring David Bomberg's 1948 painting Mount St Hilarion and the Castle Ruins. Failing to reach the UK Albums Chart, Song proved a commercial flop. Wallace recalled that "with street-friendly dance music like Happy Mondays and Soul II Soul in the ascendant, by the time the record was released in 1990 it tanked. Having toiled interminably over it – much as Talk Talk did with Spirit of Eden – they watched it disappear, seemingly without trace." Campbell reflected that there "wasn't really a hope in hell" for the album to be successful, referring to its commercial response as "the mood of the record".

Despite its poor sales, Song was critically acclaimed for its unique sound. Peter Kane of Q described the album as exploring the rich potential for "atmospheric synthersizer pop", with conversational songs of "quiet desperation" bearing tenderness and dour humour to "accompany the often crippling hurt of life and love among the ruins," ultimately hailing it "a sizeable achievement". A reviewer for Hi-Fi News & Record Review wrote that the album's "soft soporific sounds envelope clever lyrical exercises" in a manner comparable to the Blue Nile. Dave Schulps of Trouser Press described the album as often hypnotic, sounding "something like Philip Glass meets Marc Almond", but felt listeners may find the record "a bit tedious" if they were not drawn in by the lyrics, concluding: "This is music best listened to when distractions are at a minimum; don't expect to hear it in dance clubs." Penny Kiley of the Liverpool Echo recommended Song in her "albums of the month" column.

In a more reserved review, Glenn Rice of Select praised It's Immaterial for approaching their "gloomy" subjects "sort of sideways on", with whispered vocals and instrumentation that together suggest "a more subdued Pet Shop Boys", but felt the band seemed disengaged and unenthusiastic, describing Song as "the pop equivalent of a Lowry painting – simplistic, flat and populated by workaday characters fostering ideas of escape from life's dreariness." Alistair Mabbott of The List considered the uncommercial sound of the album disappointing, adding that if the duo "intended it to be leavened by a dose of quirky humour, it hasn't worked." He also compared Campbell's unfavourably with Paul Buchanan of the Blue Nile, a band he noted the album's "sustained mood and melancholy" was texturally similar to.

== Legacy ==
Held in high esteem by Its Immaterial fans, Song was retrospectively described by Whitehead as "the It's Immaterial idea to an extreme," while Campbell said that he and Whitehead "were very proud of what we'd offered. If you look at what you're trying to produce as works of art, I actually thought Song was the nearest I'd got to something that would actually stand the test of time. And I think it's proven that." In 2009, Song was reissued by Cherry Red Records with bonus B-sides from the "Heaven Knows" single and liner notes from Malcolm Dome. In the liner notes, Dome said that although Song was not progressive rock, it was still an album of progressive music with "the precursors of what others have taken into the 21st Century", and called it "a work of art – modern art rock, if you like". In 2024, the editors of Uncut ranked the album at number 183 in their list of "The 500 Greatest Albums of the 1990s", writing: "Shattering the standard chart pop format, It's Immaterial's second retained the synthpop atmospheres but discarded all the choruses, making for a series of wry musical stories from a working-class Britain akin to a synthpop A Taste of Honey."

== Track listing ==
All tracks are written by John Campbell and Jarvis Whitehead.

No.	Title	Length
1.	"New Brighton"	5:51
2.	"Endless Holiday"	5:35
3.	"An Ordinary Life"	5:04
4.	"Heaven Knows"	4:29
5.	"In the Neighbourhood"	5:20
6.	"Missing"	5:20
7.	"Homecoming"	4:36
8.	"Summer Winds"	4:40
9.	"Life on the Hill"	6:12
10.	"Your Voice"	5:18
Total length:		52:28

2009 reissue bonus tracks
No.	Title	Length
11.	"River"	3:07
12.	"Faith"	4:31
Total length:		60:06

== Personnel ==
Adapted from the liner notes of Song

- John Campbell – performer
- Jarvis Whitehead – performer
- Calum Malcolm – mixing, production
