= The Spitfire Boys =

English punk band

- Also known as: The Blackmailers (early for Liverpool incarnation); The White Boys (early for Wales incarnation)
- Origin: Merseyside, England; Cardiff, Wales
- Genres: Punk rock, new wave
- Years active: 1977–1980
- Past members: David Littler (in 1979, David Francis); Pete Griffiths; Mike Rigby; Paul Rutherford; Peter Clarke; Pete Wylie; Peter Millman; Kurt Prasser; Chris Brazier

The Spitfire Boys were the first Liverpool punk band to release a single ("British Refugee" c/w "Mein Kampf"). The Spitfire Boys were mainly notable for including in their line-up Peter Clarke, who went on to drum for the Slits and later Siouxsie and the Banshees and the Creatures (as well as marrying Siouxsie) as Budgie, and Paul Rutherford, later better known for being a member of 1980s pop band Frankie Goes to Hollywood. Jones (a.k.a. guitarist David Littler) went on to join the Photons, which also included Steve Strange (Visage) and Vince Ely (the Psychedelic Furs).

== History ==
=== Liverpool era ===
In early 1977, David Littler saw the Heartbreakers live at Eric's Club, in Liverpool, and asked them about a band he had, but really didn't exist, and the group gave him a place to support them alongside Slaughter and the Dogs and Buzzcocks at Warrington Parr Hall, Warrington, Cheshire, in May. The band was formed shortly afterwards by Littler as guitarist, alongside his friends, bassist Peter Griffiths and lead vocalist Michael Rigby, and Steve Platt a drummer. A short time later, while preparing for the gig, the band changed their name to the Spitfire Boys as a suggestion of Wayne County. For their first gig at Warrington Parr Hall, they played covers of the Ramones.

After their debut gig, the band had their first drummer, Peter Clarke, then an art student and member of Albert Dock, later Yachts. With that new line-up, the band played their second gig at Eric's Club. After that, the group sacked off Michael Rigby, who was replaced, as suggestion of Clarke, by Paul Rutherford.

They released their first single, British Refugee 7", on 7 October 1977, on RKO Records.

During the brief era of that line-up, they toured UK. They also supported the Prefects and the Slits (later Clarke's band), and also played a gig with Holly Johnson.

In December, Pete Wylie (formerly of Crucial Three and The Mystery Girls) joined the band, but only for a few rehearsals. On 22 December 1977, the band split up, Clarke, Griffiths and Wylie formed the Nova Mob (along Julian Cope), and Paul Rutherford formed the Opium Eaters, while Littler moved to London in January 1978, where he joined the Photons, alongside Steve Strange (later Visage). Griffiths joined turned his back on the entire music scene, citing the growing trend in drug abuse, and general disillusionment as his reasons.

In July 2006, the band had "British Refugee" re-released on a Korova Records compilation album, entitled North by Northwest, which was compiled by Paul Morley.

=== Wales era ===
After Littler disbanded the short-lived Photons, he moved to Cardiff, Wales, in October 1978, where he formed a band, the White Boys, but changed their name to the Spitfire Boys, as pressure by a financer of the band, who thought the name would sell better. That time, the line-up was formed by Littler (as David Francis) on vocals and guitar, and former Nylonz members Peter Millman on guitar, Kurt Prasser on bass and Chris Brazier on drums. That alineation recorded and released the 7" single, "Funtime" in 1979. In October 1979, the band moved to London, where they recorded some demos with RKO Records. By 1980, despite the interest of Major Label, they disbanded, and Littler joined White Brothers.

== Discography ==
- "British Refugee" (RKO, 7 October 1977)
- "Funtime" (Impeccable, 1979)

== See also ==
- Big in Japan
- List of 1970s punk rock musicians
