= Japanese aesthetics =

Set of ancient and modern ideals

Sōji-ji, of the Soto Zen school

Japanese aesthetics comprise a set of ancient ideals that include wabi (transient and stark beauty), sabi (the beauty of natural patina and aging), and yūgen (profound grace and subtlety). These ideals, and others, underpin much of Japanese cultural and aesthetic norms on what is considered tasteful or beautiful. Thus, while seen as a philosophy in Western societies, the concept of aesthetics in Japan is seen as an integral part of daily life. Japanese aesthetics now encompass a variety of ideals; some of these are traditional while others are modern and sometimes influenced by other cultures.

== Shinto and Buddhism ==
Shinto is considered to be at the fountain-head of Japanese culture. With its emphasis on the wholeness of nature and character in ethics, and its celebration of the landscape, it sets the tone for Japanese aesthetics. Until the thirteenth century, Shinto remained the main influence on Japanese aesthetics. In the Buddhist tradition, all things are considered as either evolving from or dissolving into nothingness. This "nothingness" is not empty space. It is rather a space of potentiality. If the seas represent potential then each thing is like a wave arising from it and returning to it. There are no permanent waves. At no point is a wave complete, even at its peak. Nature is seen as a dynamic whole that is to be admired and appreciated. This appreciation of nature has been fundamental to many Japanese aesthetic ideals, "arts," and other cultural elements. In this respect, the notion of "art" (or its conceptual equivalent) is also quite different from Western traditions (see Japanese art).

== Wabi-sabi ==
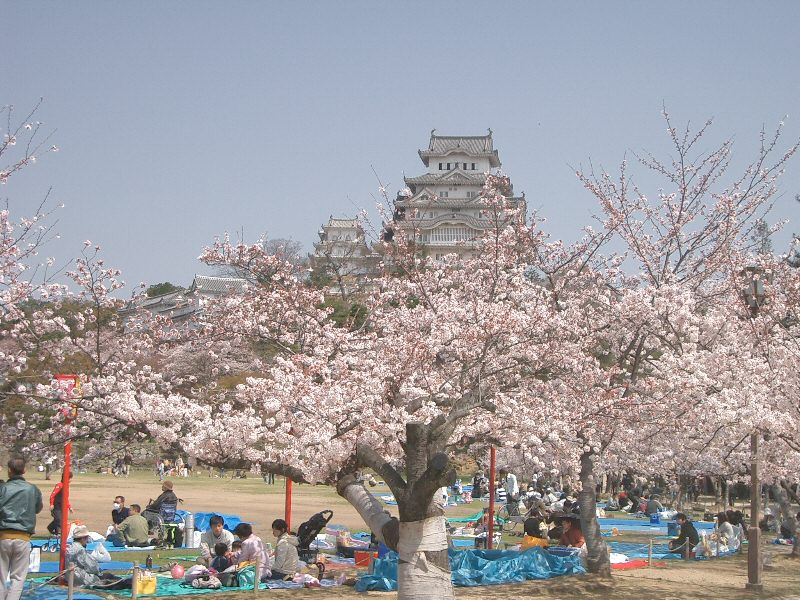
Hanami ("blossom viewing") parties at Himeji Castle

Wabi and sabi refer to a mindful approach to everyday life. Over time their meanings overlapped and converged until they were unified into wabi-sabi, the aesthetic defined as the beauty of things "imperfect, impermanent, and incomplete". Things in bud, or things in decay, as it were, are more evocative of wabi-sabi than things in full bloom because they suggest the transience of things. As things come and go, they show signs of their coming or going, and these signs are considered to be beautiful. In this, beauty is an altered state of consciousness and can be seen in the mundane and simple. The signatures of nature can be so subtle that it takes a quiet mind and a cultivated eye to discern them. In Zen philosophy there are seven aesthetic principles for achieving Wabi-Sabi.

Fukinsei (不均斉): asymmetry, irregularity;

Kanso (簡素): simplicity;

Koko (考古): basic, weathered;

Shizen (自然): without pretense, natural as a human behaviour;

Yūgen (幽玄): subtly profound grace, not obvious;

Datsuzoku (脱俗): unbounded by convention, free;

Seijaku (静寂): tranquility, silence.

Each of these things are found in nature but can suggest virtues of human character and appropriateness of behaviour. This, in turn suggests that virtue and civility can be instilled through an appreciation of, and practice in, the arts. Hence, aesthetic ideals have an ethical connotation and pervades much of the Japanese culture.

== Miyabi ==
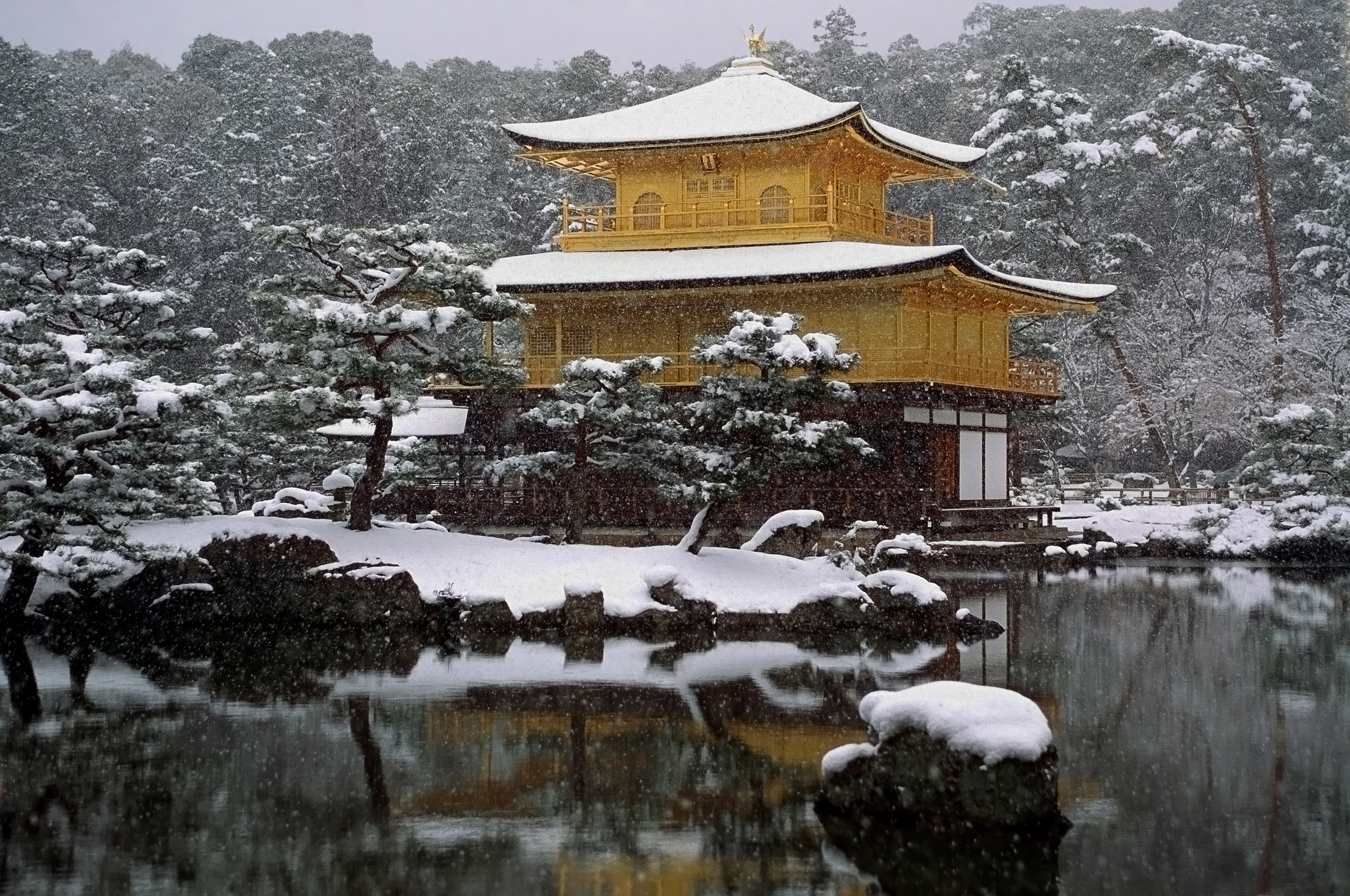
The Temple of the Golden Pavilion (Kinkaku-ji)

Miyabi (雅) is one of the oldest of the traditional Japanese aesthetic ideals, though perhaps not as prevalent as Iki or Wabi-sabi. In modern Japanese, the word is usually translated as "elegance," "refinement," or "courtliness" and sometimes referred to as "heart-breaker".

The aristocratic ideal of Miyabi demanded the elimination of anything that was absurd or vulgar and the "polishing of manners, diction, and feelings to eliminate all roughness and crudity so as to achieve the highest grace." It expressed that sensitivity to beauty which was the hallmark of the Heian era. Miyabi is often closely connected to the notion of Mono no aware, a bittersweet awareness of the transience of things, and thus it was thought that things in decline showed a great sense of miyabi.

== Shibui ==
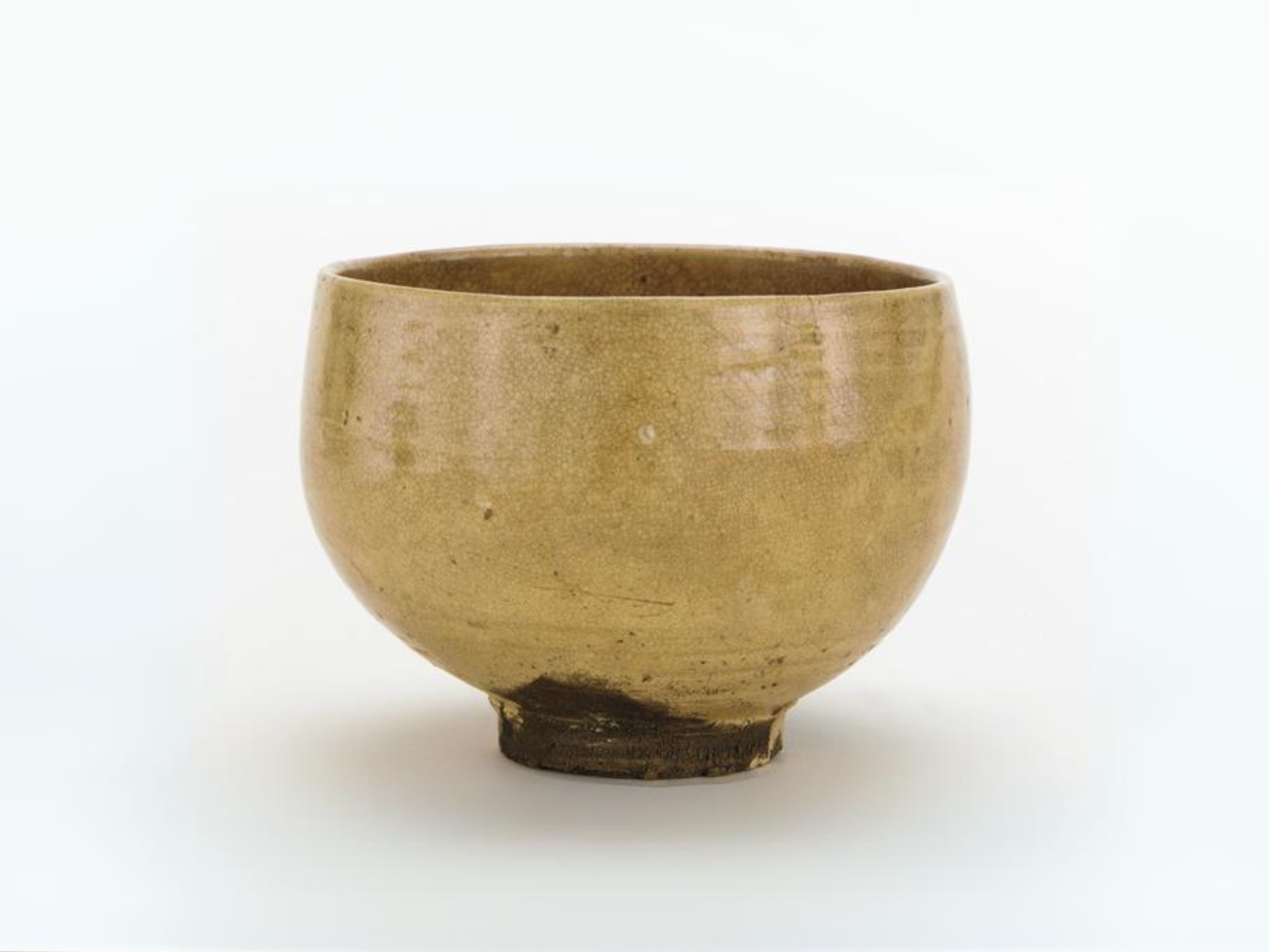
An 18th century tea bowl, exhibiting the aesthetics of shibui

Shibui (渋い) (adjective), shibumi (渋み) (noun), or shibusa (渋さ) (noun) are Japanese words which refer to a particular aesthetic or beauty of simple, subtle, and unobtrusive beauty. Originating in the Nanbokuchō period (1336–1392) as shibushi, the term originally referred to a sour or astringent taste, such as that of an unripe persimmon. Shibui maintains that literal meaning still, and remains the antonym of amai (甘い), meaning 'sweet'. Like other Japanese aesthetic terms, such as iki and wabi-sabi, shibui can apply to a wide variety of subjects, not just art or fashion.

Shibusa includes the following essential qualities:

1. Shibui objects appear to be simple overall but they include subtle details, such as textures, that balance simplicity with complexity.

2. This balance of simplicity and complexity ensures that one does not tire of a shibui object, allowing new meanings to be continuously discovered.

3. Shibusa is not to be confused with wabi or sabi. Though many wabi or sabi objects are shibui, not all shibui objects are wabi or sabi. Wabi or sabi objects can be more severe and sometimes exaggerate intentional imperfections to such an extent that they can appear to be artificial. Shibui objects are not necessarily imperfect or asymmetrical, though they can include these qualities.

4. Shibusa walks a fine line between contrasting aesthetic concepts such as elegant and rough or spontaneous and restrained.

== Iki ==
Iki (いき, often written 粋) is a traditional aesthetic ideal in Japan. The basis of iki is thought to have formed among the urbane mercantile class (Chōnin) in Edo in the Tokugawa period (1603–1868). Iki is an expression of simplicity, sophistication, spontaneity, and originality. It is ephemeral, straightforward, measured, and unselfconscious. Iki is not overly refined, pretentious, complicated. Iki may signify a personal trait, or artificial phenomena exhibiting human will or consciousness. Iki is not used to describe natural phenomena, but may be expressed in human appreciation of natural beauty, or in the nature of human beings. The phrase iki is generally used in Japanese culture to describe qualities that are aesthetically appealing and when applied to a person, what they do, or have, constitutes a high compliment. Iki is not found in nature. While similar to wabi-sabi in that it disregards perfection, iki is a broad term that encompasses various characteristics related to refinement with flair. The tasteful manifestation of sensuality can be iki. Etymologically, iki has a root that means pure and unadulterated. However, it also carries a connotation of having an appetite for life.

== Jo-ha-kyū ==
Jo-ha-kyū (序破急) is a concept of modulation and movement applied in a wide variety of traditional Japanese arts. Roughly translated to "beginning, break, rapid", it implies a tempo that begins slowly, accelerates, and then ends swiftly. This concept is applied to elements of the Japanese tea ceremony, to kendō, to the traditional theatre, to Gagaku, and to the traditional collaborative linked verse forms renga and renku (haikai no renga).

== Yūgen ==
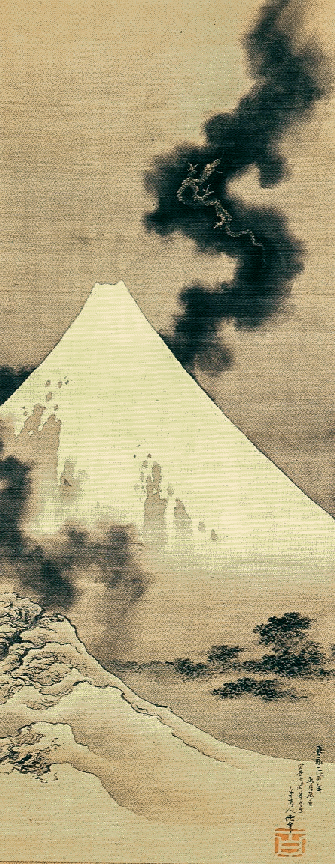
The Dragon of Smoke Escaping from Mt Fuji, painting by Katsushika Hokusai

Yūgen (幽玄) is an important concept in traditional Japanese aesthetics. The exact translation of the word depends on the context. In the Chinese philosophical texts the term was taken from, yūgen meant "dim", "deep" or "mysterious". In the criticism of Japanese waka poetry, it was used to describe the subtle profundity of things that are only vaguely suggested by the poems, and was also the name of a style of poetry (one of the ten orthodox styles delineated by Fujiwara no Teika in his treatises).

Yūgen suggests that which is beyond what can be said, but it is not an allusion to another world. It is about this world, this experience. According to Zeami Motokiyo, all of the following are portals to yūgen:

"To watch the sun sink behind a flower-clad hill.

To wander on in a huge forest without thought of return. To stand upon the shore and gaze after a boat that disappears behind distant islands. To contemplate the flight of wild geese seen and lost among the clouds.

And, subtle shadows of bamboo on bamboo."

Zeami was the originator of the dramatic art form Noh theatre and wrote the classic book on dramatic theory (Kadensho). He uses images of nature as a constant metaphor. For example, "snow in a silver bowl" represents "the Flower of Tranquility".

== Geidō ==
Right screen of the Pine Trees screens (松林図 屏風, Shōrin-zu byōbu) by Hasegawa Tōhaku, c. 1595

Geidō (芸道) refers to the various traditional Japanese arts disciplines: Noh (能) (theater), kadō (華道) (Japanese flower arrangement), shodō (書道) (Japanese calligraphy), Sadō (茶道) (Japanese tea ceremony), and yakimono (焼物) (Japanese pottery). All of these disciplines carry an ethical and aesthetic connotation and teach an appreciation of the process of creation. To introduce discipline into their training, Japanese warriors followed the example of the arts that systematized practice through prescribed forms called kata—think of the tea ceremony. Training in combat techniques incorporated the way of the arts (Geidō), practice in the arts themselves, and instilling aesthetic concepts (for example, yugen) and the philosophy of arts (geido ron). This led to combat techniques becoming known as the martial arts (even today, David Lowry shows, in the 'Sword and Brush: the spirit of the martial arts', the affinity of the martial arts with the other arts). All of these arts are a form of tacit communication and we can, and do, respond to them by appreciation of this tacit dimension.

== Ensō ==
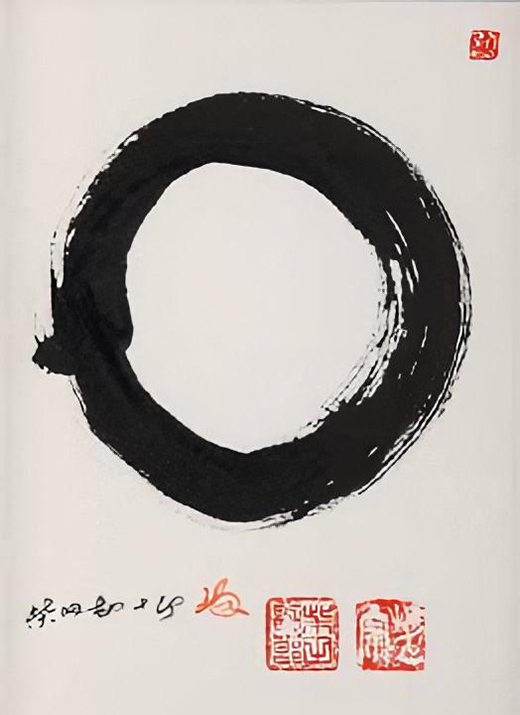
Ensō by Kanjuro Shibata XX Enso c. 2000

Ensō (円相) is a Japanese word meaning "circle". It symbolizes the Absolute, enlightenment, strength, elegance, the Universe, and the void; it also may be taken to symbolize the Japanese aesthetic itself. Zen Buddhist calligraphists may "believe that the character of the artist is fully exposed in how she or he draws an ensō. Only a person who is mentally and spiritually complete can draw a true ensō. Some artists will practice drawing an ensō daily, as a kind of spiritual exercise."

== Aesthetics and Japan's cultural identities ==
Because of its nature, Japanese aesthetics has a wider relevance than is usually accorded to aesthetics in the West. In her pathmaking book, Eiko Ikegami reveals a complex history of social life in which aesthetic ideals become central to Japan's cultural identities. She shows how networks in the performing arts, the tea ceremony, and poetry shaped tacit cultural practices and how politeness and politics are inseparable. She contends that what in Western cultures are normally scattered, like art and politics, have been, and are, distinctly integrated in Japan.

After the introduction of Western notions in Japan, Wabi Sabi aesthetics ideals have been re-examined with Western values, by both Japanese and non-Japanese. Therefore, recent interpretations of the aesthetics ideals inevitably reflect Judeo-Christian perspectives and Western philosophy.

== Japanese aesthetics and technology ==
Contribution to the broad subject of Japanese aesthetics and technology, it is suggested that carefully curated high speed camera photographs of fluid dynamics during events are able to capture the beauty of natural phenomenon in a characteristically Japanese manner.

== Gastronomy ==
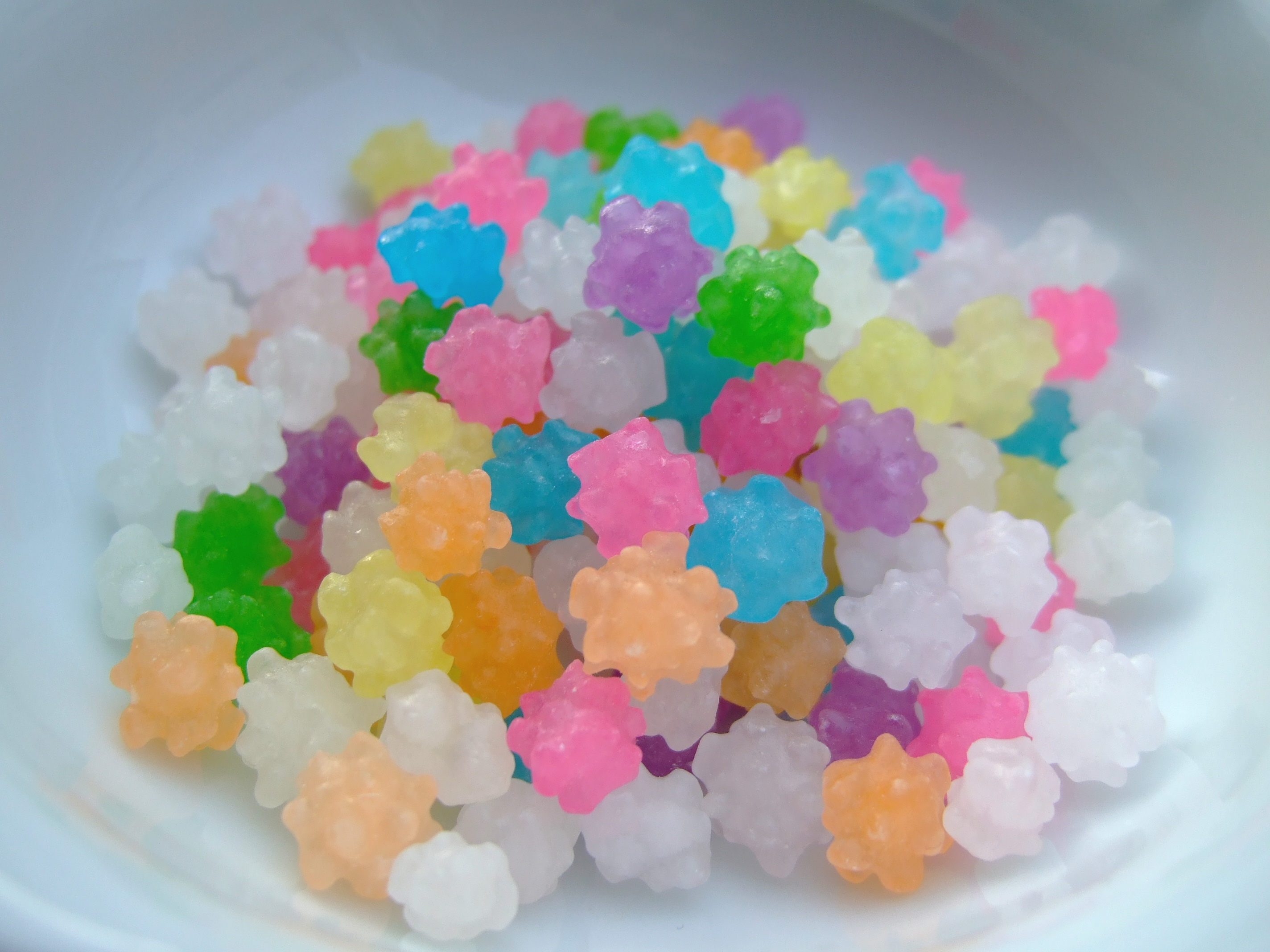
Konpeitō in various colors

Many traditional Japanese aesthetic criteria are manifest in, and discussed as part of, diverse elements of Japanese cuisine; see kaiseki for a refined expression.

== Kawaii ==
A modern phenomenon, since the 1970s cuteness or kawaii (可愛い; "cute", "adorable", "loveable") in Japanese has become a prominent aesthetic of Japanese popular culture, entertainment, clothing, food, toys, personal appearance, behavior, and mannerisms.

As a cultural phenomenon, cuteness is increasingly accepted in Japan as a part of Japanese culture and national identity. Tomoyuki Sugiyama, author of Cool Japan, believes that "cuteness" is rooted in Japan's harmony-loving culture, and Nobuyoshi Kurita, a sociology professor at Musashi University in Tokyo, has stated that cute is a "magic term" that encompasses everything that's acceptable and desirable in Japan.

== See also ==
- 5S (methodology)
- Big in Japan
- Cuteness in Japanese culture
- Honkadori
- Ikebana
- Ishin-denshin
- Japanese garden
- Japanese music
- Japanese sword
- Mono no aware
