= Do Animals Believe in God? =

Studio album by Pink Military
- Released: 1980
- Recorded: Cargo Studios, Rochdale
- Label: Eric's 004
- Producer: Bob Harding, Tony Bowers

Do Animals Believe in God? is the sole studio album by English post-punk band Pink Military, released in 1980 by record label Eric's. "Did You See Her?" was re-recorded for the album. Another version had previously been released as a single. The sleeve was designed by Bob Wakelin of Modern Eon.

== Reception ==
Professional ratings
Review scores
Source	Rating
AllMusic	4.5/5 stars
Trouser Press	unfavourable

Trouser Press called the album "an eclectically derivative (yet amusing) hodgepodge that is neither stunningly original nor disgustingly clichéd".

Do Animals Believe in God? was mentioned in NME's list of the best albums of 1980.

== Track listing ==
All tracks written and arranged by Pink Military

1. "Degenerated Man"
2. "I Cry"
3. "Did You See Her?"
4. "Wild West"
5. "Back on the London Stage"
6. "After Hiroshima"
7. "Living in a Jungle"
8. "Dreamtime"
9. "War Games"
10. "Heaven/Hell"
11. "Do Animals Believe in God?"

== Personnel ==
- Jayne Casey - vocals
- Nicky "Cool" Hillon - synthesizer, guitar
- Charlie "Gruff" Griffiths - synthesizer, Yamaha grand piano
- Chris Joyce - drums
- Neil Innes - congas, percussion

with:

- Martin Dempsey - bass on "War Games"
- John Brierley - engineer
- Bob Wakelin - sleeve design
