= Big in Japan =

Big in Japan may refer to:

- Big in Japan (phrase), a literal or ironic expression

== Music ==
- Big in Japan (band), a 1970s British punk band
- Big in Japan: Live in Tokyo 2010, an album by Klaus Schulze, 2010
- "Big in Japan" (Alphaville song), 1984; covered by Guano Apes (2000) and others
- "Big in Japan" (Martin Solveig and Dragonette song), 2011, featuring Idoling!!!
- "Big in Japan", a song by Big in Japan from Brutality, Religion and a Dance Beat, 1977
- "Big in Japan", a song by Tom Waits from Mule Variations, 1999

== Other media ==
- I Survived a Japanese Game Show, the American version of the Big in Japan franchise format, a 2008–2009 TV show
- People Just Do Nothing: Big in Japan, a 2021 British comedy film
- Fantastic Four/Iron Man: Big in Japan, a 2005–2006 comic book series by Seth Fisher and Zeb Wells
