= Get Real (song) =

Single by Paul Rutherford

from the album Oh World
- B-side: "Happy Face"
- Released: 26 September 1988
- Length: 3:35
- Label: 4th & B'way; Island
- Songwriters: Paul Rutherford; Martin Fry; Mark White; David Clayton
- Producers: Mark White; Martin Fry

Paul Rutherford singles chronology
"Get Real" (1988)	"I Want Your Love" (1988)

"Get Real" is the debut solo single by English singer Paul Rutherford, released on 26 September 1988 from his debut solo album, Oh World (1989). A collaboration with ABC, the song was written by Rutherford, Martin Fry, Mark White and David Clayton, and was produced by White and Fry. "Get Real" reached number 47 in the UK Singles Chart and remained in the top 100 for four weeks. The song received an airplay ban by the BBC.

A music video was filmed to promote the single, which featured Rutherford in the Sonoran Desert.

== Background ==
Speaking to Simon Witter in 1988, Rutherford said about "Get Real", "It's got quite a strong melody, it's quite vague and quite ethereal. I don't really see it as acid house, I think it's more like Giorgio Moroder. It reminds me more of 'I Feel Love' than anything else. It's that type of thing, it's very European." He added to Melody Maker in 1989, "'Get Real' was so off the wall, even with the whole Acid thing going on, there was something special about it. I knew no one would understand it, but Island said it was a definite Top 10 hit."

== Critical reception ==
Upon its release, Jerry Smith of Music Week described "Get Real" as a "burbling House style dance track", but felt that "even its breathy atmospherics fail to make it less than pedestrian". Wee Papa Girl Rappers guest reviewed the song for Number One, with Sandra Lawrence commenting, "I'm quite into that acid music, it's good dance music but this one's a bit mellow, a bit commercial." In 1989, Melody Maker described the song as a "slab of Acid for the radical dance faction, all squiggly synths and slithery bass." In 2004, FutureMusic described the song as "kind of like Giorgio Moroder meets Kraftwerk with a 303".

== Track listing ==
7-inch single

1. "Get Real" – 3:35
2. "Happy Face" – 4:24

12-inch single

1. "Get Real" (Happy House mix) – 7:22
2. "Get Real" – 3:35
3. "Happy Face" – 4:24

12-inch single (UK "Sinister" release)

1. "Get Real" (Sinister) – 6:31
2. "Get Real" (Don't Let 'Em Dub You Down) – 6:33
3. "Happy Face" – 4:24

12-inch single (UK "Hardcore" release)

1. "Get Real" (Hardcore) – 9:28
2. "Get Real" – 3:35
3. "Happy Face" – 6:50

CD single

1. "Get Real" (Happy House mix) – 7:24
2. "Get Real" – 3:35
3. "Happy Face" (full length) – 6:50

== Personnel ==
- Paul Rutherford – lead vocals, keyboards and programming on "Get Real"
- Beverley Skeete, Paul Lee, Lorenza Johnson – backing vocals on "Get Real"
- Derek Green – backing vocals and backing vocal arrangement on "Get Real"
- Dave Clayton – keyboards on "Get Real"
- Mark White – keyboards, producer and programming on "Get Real", producer of "Happy Face"
- Joe Dworniak – bass programming on "Get Real"
- Danny Cummings – percussion on "Get Real"
- Martin Fry – producer of "Get Real" and "Happy Face"
- Mark Stent – engineer on "Get Real"
- Jack Adams – mastering on "Get Real"

== Charts ==
Chart (1988–1989)	Peak position
Australia (ARIA)	132
UK Singles (OCC)	47
