= Bette Bright =

English rock singer

Bette Bright (born Catherine Anne Martin, 23 December 1953) is an English rock singer.

== Personal life ==
Anne Martin was born in Tankerton, a suburb of Whitstable in Kent, in south-east England. She attended Rochester Grammar School, with A-levels in English, French, and Art. Afterwards she attended Notre Dame College of Education, in Liverpool.

Anne Martin married Graham McPherson, aka Suggs, lead singer of Madness, in 1981.

Her sister Alanah, who became a broadcaster and scriptwriter for the BBC, was born on 17 January 1952; Alanah died in October 2012 of pancreatic cancer. Her husband was Keith Porritt.

== Career ==
In the late 1970s, Bright was a singer for the art rock band Deaf School. After Deaf School disbanded, Bright went solo with her backing band, 'The Illuminations'. Band members were Henry Priestman (formerly with band Yachts), Rusty Egan (Visage) and Glen Matlock (Sex Pistols). In 1978, their single debut, a cover of "My Boyfriend's Back", was followed by another cover, "Captain of Your Ship", which became a minor airplay hit.

Bright's third single, "Hello, I Am Your Heart", dropped the Illuminations from the billing, and was her only chart hit. Issued in February 1980, and featuring Lee 'Kix' Thompson on saxophone, it spent a week in the UK Singles Chart at No. 50.

Around this same time, Bright (using her birth name, Anne Martin) spent some time as the singer of the Dutch band Gruppo Sportivo, and she also appeared in Malcolm McLaren's Sex Pistols film, The Great Rock 'n' Roll Swindle.

In 1981, she issued the album Rhythm Breaks the Ice, which featured songs she had written herself, but also classics like "Shoorah, Shoorah" as well as new interpretations of songs by Deaf School. Her backing band on this album - still called The Illuminations - was completely different from the group on her earlier singles, and had a similar line-up to Clive Langer & the Boxes: Clive Langer (guitar/sitar), Ian Broudie (lead guitar), James Eller (bass); Jo Allen (drums); and Ben Barson, brother of Madness keyboardist Mike Barson (keyboards). Martin Hughes subbed for Allen on two cuts; Clive Langer & The Boxes consisted of Langer, Eller, Barson and Hughes. The album was produced by Clanger/Winstanley.

Working with Barson, Langer and Alan Winstanley, Bright got to know Madness, and she and Madness singer Suggs, fell in love. They married in 1982, and she retired. She appeared in 1984 as a homeless person in the music video of "One Better Day" by Madness and rejoined her fellow Deaf School members for a reunion and a live album in 1988.

In 1992, she provided spoken word on "Walk You Home", a track on Tim Finn's fourth album, Before & After. In recent years, she has joined the reformed Deaf School for one-off appearances. In December 2007, at The O2 venue Indigo2 for Madness' aftershow party, the band were joined on stage by her daughters, who sang backing vocals. She also sang with her husband, Suggs. Bright reunited with Deaf School once again in December 2009, for a selection of UK dates in London and Liverpool, including a date at the 100 Club.

== See also ==
- List of female rock singers
