= Life's Hard and Then You Die =

1986 album by It's Immaterial

Studio album by It's Immaterial
- Released: September 1986
- Length: 45:15
- Label: Siren
- Producer: Dave Bascombe

It's Immaterial chronology
Life's Hard and Then You Die (1986)	Song (1990)

Singles from Life's Hard and Then You Die
- 1. "Ed's Funky Diner" Released: 1985; 2. "Driving Away from Home (Jim's Tune)" Released: 1986; 3. "Ed's Funky Diner (re-release)" Released: 1986

Life's Hard and Then You Die is the debut album by the British band It's Immaterial, released in September 1986. The album was released several months after the single "Driving Away from Home (Jim's Tune)" reached the top twenty on the UK Singles Chart, and spent three weeks on the UK Albums Chart, peaking at number 62.

The album's lead single "Ed's Funky Diner" had been initially released in October 1985, although it failed to chart. It was re-released in 1986 after the success of "Driving Away from Home", although again failed to make the top 40, peaking at No. 65.

== Critical reception ==
Professional ratings
Review scores
Source	Rating
AllMusic	4.5/5 stars
Classic Pop	4/5 stars
Smash Hits	9/10

Simon Braithwaite of Smash Hits wrote that Life's Hard and Then You Die shows that It's Immaterial "write jolly good pop songs. In fact everything else here is just as inspired and original as their recent hit." In a retrospective review, Michael Sutton of AllMusic wrote, "Musically, the LP is all over the place – new wave, country, blues, folk, and synth pop. Somehow the smorgasbord of styles works, because the band members aren't being eclectic just for the sake of it; they simply have a wide canvas, keeping the album fresh from beginning to end." Reviewing the 30th anniversary edition for Classic Pop, Paul Lester stated that "its mordant title and lyrics were at odds with its eclectic music, ranging from chanson-style pop and Pogues-style Irish knees-ups to flamenco and mariachi. By turns thoughtful and danceable, Life's Hard... is something of a lost treasure."

C60 Low Noise wrote, "This is an intelligent and extremely well-realised album that belies its simplistic origins. For those of you who are genuinely moved by soaring harmonised vocals (courtesy of the Christians), ironic folk rendition, rolling Spanish guitars and tongue-in-cheek meanderings, I would seriously recommend this to you." Dave Schulps at Trouser Press wrote, "A fascinating musical hybrid that touches variously on synth-pop, atmospheric art-rock, recitation and a unique brand of English country music. It may remind you of early OMD". The Guardian described the album as being "awash with influences from new wave to music hall."

== Track listing ==
All tracks written by John Campbell and Jarvis Whitehead, except where noted.

LP release - SIREN LP4

1. "Driving Away from Home (Jim's Tune)" – 4:12
2. "Happy Talk" – 5:29
3. "Rope" – 3:37
4. "The Better Idea" – 5:42
5. "Space" – 3:59
6. "The Sweet Life" – 4:38
7. "Festival Time" (Campbell, Whitehead, trad.) – 3:52
8. "Ed's Funky Diner" – 3:05
9. "Hang On Sleepy Town" – 4:20
10. "Lullaby" – 6:21

CD release - CD SIREN 4 (three bonus tracks)

11. "Washing the Air" - 5:29
12. "Ed's Funky Diner (The Keinholz Caper)" - 5:53
13. "Driving Away from Home (I Mean After All It's Only 'Dead Man's Curve')" - 6:30

== Personnel ==
It's Immaterial

- John Campbell
- Jarvis Whitehead

with:

- Brenda Kenny
- Gillian Miller
- Henry Priestman
- Merran Laginestra
- Roddy Lorimer
- Steve Wickham
- Tarrant Bailey Jr.
- The Christians

== 2016 remaster reissue ==
The album was reissued as a 2-CD set in 2016 on the Caroline label. The gatefold cardboard sleeve contains a 15-page booklet with a track-by-track commentary written by John Campbell, Jarvis Whitehead, producer Dave Bascombe and A&R man Ross Stapleton.

=== Disc One: Original album remastered, plus B-sides & single versions ===
All tracks written by John Campbell and Jarvis Whitehead, except where noted.

1. "Driving Away from Home (Jim's Tune)" – 4:12
2. "Happy Talk" – 5:29
3. "Rope" – 3:37
4. "The Better Idea" – 5:42
5. "Space" – 3:59
6. "The Sweet Life" – 4:38
7. "Festival Time" (Campbell, Whitehead, trad.) – 3:52
8. "Ed's Funky Diner" – 3:05
9. "Hang On Sleepy Town" – 4:20
10. "Lullaby" – 6:21
11. "Washing the Air" – 3:25
12. "We'll Turn Things Upside Down (The Enthusiast's Song)" – 4:32
13. "Only the Lonely" – 3:48
14. "A Crooked Tune" – 3:42
15. "Trains, Boats, Planes" – 3:51
16. "Hereby Hangs a Tale" – 4:09
17. "Kissing with Lord Herbert" – 3:01
18. "Driving Away from Home (Jim's Tune)" (single version) – 3:53
19. "Space" (single version) – 4:04

=== Disc Two: Peel Sessions & remixes ===
All tracks written by John Campbell and Jarvis Whitehead, except where noted.

1. "Space (Peel Session)" – 3:49
2. "Hang On Sleepy Town (Peel Session)" – 4:11
3. "Festival Time (Peel Session)" – 3:31
4. "Rope (Peel Session)" – 3:32
5. "Ed's Funky Diner (The Keinholz Caper)" – 5:55
6. "Washing the Air (Rub a Dub mix)" – 5:31
7. "Driving Away from Home (Wicked Weather for Walking)" – 7:13
8. "Ed's Funky Diner (Friday Night, Saturday Morning)" – 8:07
9. "We'll Turn Things Upside Down (When the Revolution Comes)" – 4:07
10. "Driving Away from Home (I Mean After All It's Only 'Dead Man's Curve')" – 6:31
11. "Space, He Called from the Kitchen..." – 7:12
12. "Rope" (extended mix) – 6:09
13. "Space" (instrumental) – 4:04
14. "Jazz Bo's Holiday Transatlantique" (written by Tarrant Bailey Junior) – 4:49
15. "Driving Away from Home" (original 4-track demo) – 3:13
