= Funtime (The Spitfire Boys song) =

Single by The Spitfire Boys
- A-side: "Funtime"
- B-side: "Trascendental Changing"
- Released: 1979
- Recorded: 1979
- Genre: Power pop, new wave
- Label: Impeccable Records
- Songwriter(s): David Francis

The Spitfire Boys singles chronology
"British Refugee" (1977)	"Funtime" (1979)

"Funtime" is a single released by the Spitfire Boys, on Impeccable Records, in 1979. The band's line-up on this release were David Littler (lead vocals, guitar), the only remaining member of the band, and ex-Nylonz members, Peter Millman (guitar), Kurt Prasser (bass) and Chris Brazier (drums).

The band was formed in Cardiff, Wales, as the White Brothers, by David Francis after dissolving the Photons, but before the release of the single, he was persuaded to rename themselves as the Spitfire Boys, for better sales.

== Track list ==
1. "Funtime"
2. "Transcendental Changing"

== Personnel ==
- David Francis: lead vocals, guitar
- Peter Millman: guitar
- Kurt Prasser: bass
- Chris Brazier: drums
