= Oh World =

Studio album by Paul Rutherford
- Released: 1989
- Studio: PRT Studios, London W1; Marcus Recording Studios, Fulham, London; Olympic Studios, London; Audio One, London
- Genre: Pop, funk, soul, house
- Length: 49:49
- Label: Island, 4th & Broadway
- Producer: Dave Clayton, Joe Dworniak, Martin Fry, Mark White

Oh World is the sole solo studio album by Paul Rutherford, the former backing singer of Frankie Goes to Hollywood, released in 1989.

== Background ==
Following the split of Frankie Goes to Hollywood in 1987, Rutherford teamed up with two production teams, Dave Clayton and Joe Dworniak and ABC's Martin Fry and Mark White, for his debut solo album. Released in 1989, the album spawned three singles. The lead single "Get Real" was banned by the BBC, and peaked at #47 in the UK. A cover of Chic's 1979 hit single "I Want Your Love" was the second single and peaked at #82. A third and final single was the title track "Oh World" which peaked at #61. However, due to the BBC ban of "Get Real" and the disappointing chart performances of the three singles, the album was never released in the UK, in favor of a European and American issue only. It was to be Rutherford's only solo album as he faded from the public eye shortly afterwards.

Oh World was written and recorded at a time when Rutherford was dealing with personal struggles and caring for his partner who would die from AIDS complications. In a 2013 interview with Penny Black Music, Rutherford recalled, "My partner died during my planned solo career so I disappeared for a while because I thought it was more important for him. It was really quite hard to deal with and took five years out of my life. I made Oh World during the middle of all this, so when you listen to it now you can hear where a lot of the music comes from in a way. I wasn't turning up for stuff and the record company was getting really cheesed with me. I spent a lot of time in hospitals, and it just got all too much for me."

== Release ==
The album was released on vinyl, cassette and CD via Island Records and 4th & Broadway in Europe, Canada and America. In 2011, the album was expanded and remastered by Cherry Red, and this release marked the first time the album was available in the UK. Featuring two discs, it included A-Side mixes, B-Sides, 12" remixes and promo-only tracks, as well as much sought-after early remixes by the likes of Arthur Baker and David Morales.

== Critical reception ==
Professional ratings
Review scores
Source	Rating
AllMusic	3/5 stars

In a retrospective review, Ned Raggett of AllMusic labelled the album as an AMG Album Pick and described it as having an "easygoing dance-mutating-into-house feel". He added: "Rutherford's performances are enjoyable if not always sit-up-straight remarkable; more than once George Michael feels like the clear role model on songs like "Who Said It Was Easy." Still, there's a looseness in the overall feeling of the album that compares favorably to Billy Mackenzie's near contemporary stumble with Wild and Lonely; Rutherford sounded more tuned in to the times on the one hand while able to take a gentler, smokies turn on songs like "The Gospel Truth."

== Track listing ==
No.	Title	Writer(s)	Length
1.	"Oh World"	David Clayton, Paul Rutherford	6:53
2.	"Deep at the Centre"	Clayton, Joe Dworniak, Rutherford	4:58
3.	"Who Said It Was Easy"	Clayton, Dworniak, Rutherford	5:10
4.	"The Gospel Truth"	Clayton, Rutherford	5:54
5.	"Light"	Clayton, Rutherford	1:13
6.	"Get Real"	Clayton, Mark White, Martin Fry, Rutherford	3:35
7.	"Cracked Wide Open"	Clayton, White, Fry, Rutherford	6:30
8.	"I Want Your Love"	Bernard Edwards, Nile Rodgers	4:18
9.	"Catch a Falling Star"	Clayton, Rutherford	6:28
10.	"Half the Picture"	Clayton, Rutherford	4:55

2011 Cherry Pop remaster bonus tracks (disc one)
No.	Title	Length
11.	"I Want Your Love" (Radio Mix)	3:49
12.	"Oh World" (Original 7" Mix)	3:55
13.	"Happy Face"	6:50
14.	"Pushed Away"	5:16
15.	"Seduction" (Edit)	4:22

2011 Cherry Pop remaster bonus tracks (disc two)
No.	Title	Length
1.	"Get Real" (Happy House Remix)	6:17
2.	"I Want Your Love" (Extended Mix)	6:20
3.	"I Want Your L.U.R.V.E."	5:00
4.	"Oh World" (Extended Mix)	4:51
5.	"Oh World" (Instrumental)	5:45
6.	"Get Real" (Hardcore)	5:45
7.	"Get Real" (Sinister)	5:45
8.	"Get Real" (Don't Let 'Em Dub You Down - Early Fade)	5:45
9.	"I Want Your Love" (Arthur Baker Remix)	5:45
10.	"Oh World" (Universal Mix)	5:45
11.	"Oh World" (Delirium Dub - Early Fade)	5:45

== Singles ==
1. "Get Real" (#47 UK)
2. "I Want Your Love" (#82 UK)
3. "Oh World" (#61 UK)

== Personnel ==
- Paul Rutherford - lead vocals, keyboard programming (on tracks 5–8)
- Joe Dworniak - producer (except tracks 5–8), bass programming
- Dave Clayton - producer (except tracks 6–8), keyboards, programming
- Martin Fry - producer (on tracks 6–8)
- Mark White - producer (on tracks 6–8), keyboards
- Blair Cunningham - drums (on track 4)
- Danny Cummings - percussion
- World of Mouth (Derek Green, Beverley Skeete, Paul Lee) - backing vocals
- Lorenza Johnson, June Montana, World of Mouth - backing vocals
- Phil Smith, Steve Sidwell - horns (on track 3)
- The Oh World Section - strings (on track 1)
- Reggae Philharmonic Orchestra - strings
- Mykaell Riley - string arrangements
- Brad Branson - cover photography
