= From Y to Z and Never Again =

EP by Big in Japan
- Released: 1978
- Recorded: November 1977 and May, July, August 1978
- Genre: Punk; post-punk
- Length: 13:22
- Label: Zoo
- Producer: Noddy Knowler; Rob Dickens; Big in Japan

From Y To Z and Never Again is an EP by the seminal punk band Big in Japan. It includes four of their six recorded songs and is notable for being the first release on Zoo Records, the label created by band members Bill Drummond and David Balfe. It was also one of the first releases that came from the late '70s-early '80s Liverpool rock scene. The EP has been out of print since 1978, but the tracks are available on the Zoo Records compilation Zoo Uncaged.

The track listing presents part of the numerous line-up changes the band suffered during their two years of existence. The only remaining members of the band during the recording of the EP were (or seemed to be) Bill Drummond and Ian Broudie.

== Track listing ==
1. "Nothing Special" – 3:37
2. "Cindy and the Barbi Dolls" – 3:31
3. "Suicide a Go Go" – 2:27
4. "Taxi" – 4:27

== Personnel ==
- Jayne: lead vocals (except 2)
- Kev Ward: vocals (3)
- Ian Broudie: guitar, lead vocals (2)
- Bill Drummond: guitar
- Holly Johnson: bass guitar (3, 4)
- Dave Balfe: bass guitar (1, 2)
- Phil Allen: drums (3)
- Budgie: drums (1, 4)
