= John Wood (design theorist) =

British professor of design (born 1945)

John Wood, DipAD, ADF(Manc), FRSA (b. 25 August 1945) is emeritus professor of design at Goldsmiths College, University of London. He taught many Young British Artists when he was deputy head of the fine art department at Goldsmiths between 1978 and 1988. He has received AHRC and EPSRC funding for research into metadesign.

== Biography ==
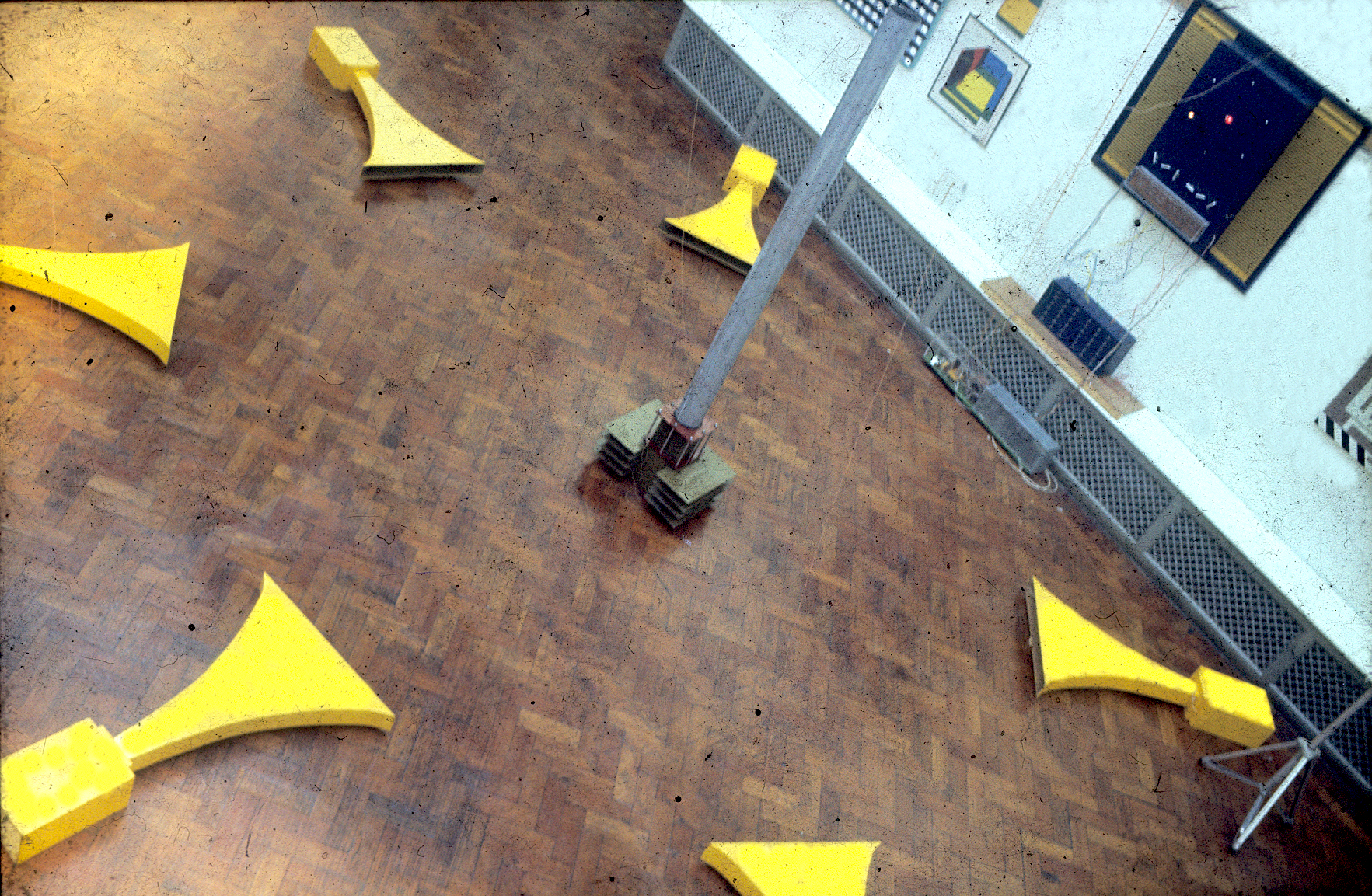
The King and Six Swift Nudes (1968)

The Machine For Saying Sorry (1974)

Born in Bath, Wood attended Harrow County School for Boys, and then studied Fine Art at Manchester School of Art. Examples of his early works include: 'King of Shouting House' (1969) – a computer assisted play, for the ICA; 'Tune Doodler' (1972) – mass-produced electronic sculpture commissioned by Jasia Reichardt. He also created "solar energy artworks" – 'Black Box' – control circuit regulated a practical solar roof at Eithen-y-Gaeir, North Wales (1974) and Sunsharer' window maximized solar energy for domestic use without compromising plant needs (1975).

Wood is an original member of the rock band Deaf School where he performs as Max Ripple, he was also an original member of the Kreutzer Quintet.

== Publications ==
- Metadesigning Designing in the Anthropocene, (2022), (Ed.) Routledge, London & New York, ISBN 9781032071022;
- Designing for Micro-utopias (2007); Thinking beyond the Possible, Ashgate, UK, ISBN 0-7546-4608-4;
- The Virtual Embodied; presence, practice, technology (1998), (Ed.)
- The Culture of Academic Rigour: Does Design Research Really Need It?

and he is also a contributor to Sublime Magazine.
