= Pink Industry =

English post-punk band

- Origin: Liverpool, England
- Genre: Post-punk
- Years active: 1982–1987, 2012
- Labels: Zulu, Cathexis, Isegrimm Records
- Past members: Jayne Casey; Ambrose Reynolds; Tadzio Jodlowski; Dave; Tin Tin; Kif Cole; Phil

Pink Industry were a post-punk band from Liverpool formed by Jayne Casey after her previous band Pink Military split up in 1981.

== History ==
When Pink Military split up in 1981, singer Jayne Casey formed the more electronically oriented band Pink Industry along with Ambrose Reynolds (who had played with Casey in Big in Japan in the 1970s, and was an early member of Frankie Goes to Hollywood), the duo initially using several other musicians, later becoming a trio with the addition of Tadzio Jodlowski. The band's sound was described by Trouser Press as "like Siouxsie Sioux fronting Japan". The band's first release was the Forty-Five EP featuring lead track "Is This The End?", released in February 1982. The band's debut album, Low Technology, was released the following year, reaching number 12 on the UK Independent Chart. A second album, Who Told You You Were Naked, followed later the same year, and peaked at number nine on the Indie chart. Between 1982 and 1984, the band recorded four sessions for John Peel's BBC Radio 1 show. After a two-year gap since their previous release, the band returned in 1985 with the New Beginnings album. A final single was released in late 1987, the band splitting up around the same time. Casey subsequently concentrated on a television career. In January, 28th, 2012, Pink Industry (Jayne, Ambrose and support band) reunited for an exclusive concert in São Paulo, Brazil, in Cine Joia venue.

== Discography ==
=== Albums ===
- Low Technology (1983), Zulu - UK Indie No. 12
- Who Told You You Were Naked? (1983), Zulu - UK Indie No. 9
- New Beginnings (1985), Zulu

Compilations

- Pink Industry (1988), Cathexis LP (released on CD in 1989 as Retrospective by Parade Amoureuse with slightly modified track listing)
- New Naked Technology (1995), Audioglobe
- Low Technology/Forty Five EP (2008), Isegrimm Records
- New Naked Technology 2010 Remasters (2010), Wave

=== Singles, EPs ===
- Forty-Five EP (1982), Zulu
- "What Wouldn't I Give" (1985), Zulu - UK Indie No. 9
- "Don't Let Go" (1987), Cathexis - UK Indie No. 45
