= Driving Away from Home (Jim's Tune) =

Single by It's Immaterial

from the album Life's Hard and Then You Die
- B-side: "Trains, Boats, Planes"
- Released: March 1986
- Length: 3:50
- Label: Siren
- Songwriter(s): John Campbell; Jarvis Whitehead
- Producer(s): Dave Bascombe

It's Immaterial singles chronology
"Ed's Funky Diner" (1985)	"Driving Away from Home (Jim's Tune)" (1986)	"Ed's Funky Diner (Friday Night, Saturday Morning)" (1986)

Official Video
- "Driving Away from Home (Jim's Tune)" on YouTube

"Driving Away from Home (Jim's Tune)" is a song by British band It's Immaterial. Released as a single in March 1986, it spent eight weeks on the UK Singles Chart, peaking at number 18 in April 1986.

The song has been described by the band as a "British on-the-road song". They initially recorded the song in Milwaukee with Jerry Harrison from the band Talking Heads, but the band was unhappy about Harrison's idea of making the song a country and western pastische and returned to England to record a new version with producer Dave Bascombe. The "Jim's Tune" in the title refers to Jim Lieber, a harmonica-player in a blues band the band saw in a bar in Milwaukee. He was invited to record in the studio and the band was so happy about his playing that they credited him in the title.

== Charts ==
Chart (1986)	Peak position
Ireland (IRMA)	19
Netherlands (Single Top 100)	37
Sweden (Sverigetopplistan)	12
UK Singles (OCC)	18
