= Yachts (band) =

British power pop/new wave band

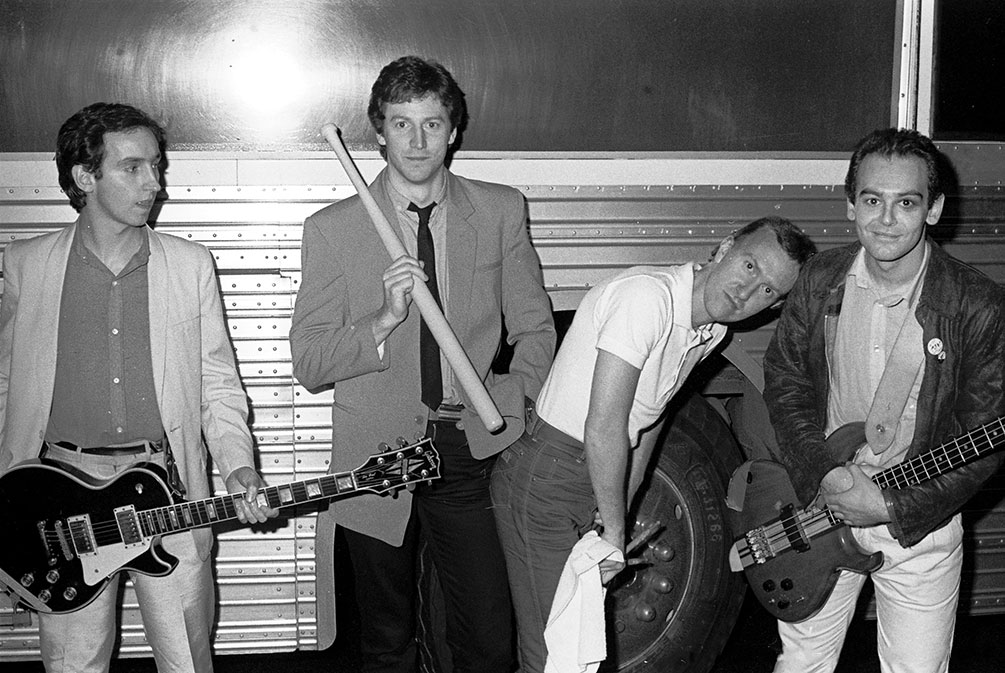
- Yachts in 1978

Background information
- Origin: Liverpool, England
- Genres: Power pop, new wave, rock
- Years active: 1977–1981
- Labels: Stiff Records; Radar; Polydor; Demon
- Member of: It's Immaterial; The Christians
- Past members: Bob Bellis; J.J. Campbell; Martin Dempsey; Henry Priestman; Martin J. Watson; Mick Shiner; Glyn Havard; Ray "Chopper" Cooper

Yachts were a British power pop/new wave band, best remembered for their 1977 single "Suffice to Say" and the minor new wave classic "Love You, Love You".

== Career ==
=== Formation ===
The Yachts was formed by art students in Liverpool in April 1977, evolving out of an earlier R&B band, known variously as Albert Dock or Albert and the Cod Warriors, who had developed a reputation locally for their energetic sets. Albert Dock had supported the Sex Pistols at one of their infamous early performances in 1976. The band originally consisted of: Bob Bellis (drums, vocals); John (J.J.) Campbell (vocals); Martin Dempsey (bass guitar, vocals, later replaced by first Ray "Chopper" Cooper, then Mick Shiner and finally Glyn Havard); Henry Priestman (vocals, keyboards); and Martin Watson (guitar, vocals). They played their first show as the Yachts at Eric's nightclub in Liverpool, supporting Elvis Costello.

=== First recordings ===
Opening for Costello led to a recording contract with Stiff Records, where they released one single, "Suffice to Say", written by Priestman and Campbell and produced by Will Birch. In a 1977 Trouser Press review, Jim Green described the single as "more spunk than punk, a simple little organ-based pop tune parodying the 'I love you so much I wrote you this song' school of mystical bull*$%-." They also released a novelty single, "Do the Chud", as the Chuddy Nuddies. Soon after the release of the two singles, in 1978, Campbell left the band. Yachts also parted company with Stiff Records.

With Stiff labelmates, Costello and Nick Lowe, they signed with the newly formed Radar Records label on the strength of demos produced by Clive Langer. On 9 October 1978, a few weeks after releasing their first single on Radar, "Look Back in Love (Not in Anger)" (a cover of a Teddy and the Pandas song from the 1960s), the band recorded the first of two sessions at Maida Vale 4 studio, for John Peel at BBC Radio 1. The track listing was "Mantovani's Hits", "Yachting Type", "Look Back in Love", and "Then and Now". The band's second session was recorded in June 1979.

=== Yachts ===
After releasing two singles on Radar, the band recorded their debut LP in New York City with producer Richard Gottehrer. However, there was a delay in releasing the album, as the tapes had been confiscated by customs and a remix was also needed for "technical reasons". During this delay, the "Love You, Love You" single was released. Reviewing the LP in Christgau's Record Guide: Rock Albums of the Seventies (1981), Robert Christgau wrote: "You have to hand it to a group that can give itself such a ridiculous name and then come up with credible songs called 'Yachting Type' and 'Semaphore Love.' Actually, most of these songs are pretty credible, even (or especially) the one structured around the word 'tantamount.' Funny boys, no doubt about it. But their biggest joke is a mock-snooty, mock-operatic rock crooning style that I'm not eager to hear again."

=== Without Radar ===
They toured in the US and Europe with Joe Jackson and the Who, and released a second album, Without Radar, which was recorded with producer Martin Rushent. In a 1980 Trouser Press review of the album, Tim Sommer said that Yachts have "[f]loating and complex keyboard parts, rich three- and five-part harmonies, pointedly clever lyrics and allusions ... intricate song structures [that] all blend wonderfully." Both Yachts albums were released by Polydor in the U.S., but the first album had a modified track listing and was re-titled S.O.S.

== Dissolution ==
Dempsey left the group in 1980 and became a member of Pink Military. Campbell helped to found It's Immaterial. Yachts finally split up in 1981. Priestman, who for a time was a member of both Yachts and Bette Bright & the Illuminations, then went on to join It's Immaterial, Wah! and, most notably, the Christians, more recently working as a producer with Mark Owen and Melanie C.

== Legacy ==
Retrospective appraisals of the band's output vary. M.C. Strong dismisses Yachts as "one of the many outfits jostling for recognition in the overcrowded pop / rock marketplace". Colin Larkin is more generous, writing that "Yachts' popularity was fleeting but they left behind several great three-minute slices of pop, including a cover of R. Dean Taylor's "There's a Ghost in My House". Vernon Joynson summed up Yachts' approach: "Lyrically, much of their material was in the usual boy / girl realm but with humour. Musically, they ranged from sixties influenced rock with [farfisa] organ to fast-paced punk-cum-[new wave]". Gamma Men drummer Steve Gardner loved this approach. "They hammered out these rocking pop songs surrounded by swirling washes of cheap keyboards. Lots of their songs strung together common threads of boating and strange tales of love, and they had some hysterically funny lyrics, like 'I wouldn't climb any mountain for you/Ford any stream that's a daft thing to do/'Cos I'm cynical cynical cynical through and through' from 'Love You, Love You'". Film critic Mark Kermode, who also plays the double bass for the skiffle band the Dodge Brothers, names Yachts as one of his favourite bands.

On 25 March 2018, Priestman, along with Les Glover and other musicians, performed several Yachts songs at the release party for the Suffice to Say: The Complete Yachts Collection box set in Liverpool. Campbell and Dempsey joined Priestman and Glover at the end of the set for a performance of "Suffice to Say".

== Discography ==
=== Albums ===
- Yachts (Radar, RAD 19, June 1979) – released as S.O.S. in the US – Billboard 200 No. 179
- Without Radar (Radar, RAD 27, May 1980)

=== Singles ===
- "Suffice to Say" / "Freedom (Is a Heady Wine)" (Stiff Records, BUY 19, September 1977)
- "Do the Chud" / "Big in Japan" (as the Chuddy Nuddies, Eric's, November 1977)
- "Look Back in Love (Not in Anger)" / "I Can't Stay Long" (Radar, ADA 23, September 1978)
- "Yachting Type" / "Hypnotising Lies" (Radar, ADA 25, November 1978)
- "Love You, Love You" / "Hazy People" (live) (Radar, ADA 36, May 1979)
- "Suffice to Say" (live) / "On and On" (live) (Radar, SAM 98, June 1979) (given away with initial copies of the Yachts LP)
- "Box 202" / "Permanent Damage (live)" (Radar, ADA 42, July 1979)
- "Now I'm Spoken For" / "Secret Agents" (Radar, ADA 49, November 1979)
- "There's a Ghost in My House" / "Revelry" / "Yachting Type" (Radar, ADA 52, April 1980)
- "I.O.U. (In the Oddments Drawer)" / "24 Hours from Tulsa" (Radar, ADA 57, August 1980)
- "A Fool Like You" / "Dubmarine" (Demon, D 1005, February 1981)

=== Compilations ===
- Suffice to Say: The Complete Yachts Collection (Cherry Red, WCRCDBOX50, February 2, 2018)

=== Appearances on various artists compilations ===
- "Look Back in Love (Not in Anger)" on DIY: Teenage Kicks – UK Pop I (1976–79) (Rhino Records, 1993)
- "Yachting Types" on DIY: Starry Eyes – UK Pop II (1978–79) (Rhino Records, 1993)
- "Suffice to Say" on A Hard Nights Day: A History of Stiff Records (Double album, MCA / Universal, 1997)
- "Suffice to Say" on 1-2-3-4: A History of Punk & New Wave 1976 – 79 (5 CD box set, MCA / Universal, 1999)
- "Suffice to Say" on North by North West: Liverpool & Manchester from Punk to Post-Punk & Beyond (3 CD box set, Korova, 2006)

== See also ==
- List of bands and artists from Merseyside
