= Paul Rutherford (singer) =

British singer, musician and dancer (born 1959)

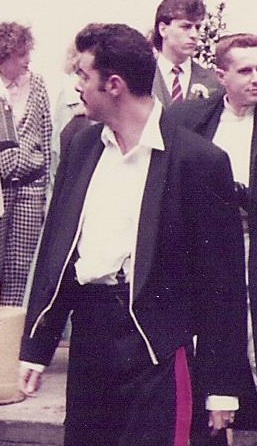
- Rutherford in 1985

Background information
- Born: 8 December 1959 (age 66); Liverpool, England
- Genres: Punk rock; hi-NRG; dance-rock; new wave; synth-pop; dance-pop
- Occupations: Singer; musician; dancer
- Instruments: Vocals; keyboards; tambourine
- Labels: ZTT; Island
- Formerly of: Frankie Goes to Hollywood; The Spitfire Boys

Paul Rutherford (born 8 December 1959) is an English singer, musician and dancer. He is best known as the dancer, keyboardist, and backing vocalist of the synth-pop band Frankie Goes to Hollywood.

== Early life ==
Rutherford was born on 8 December 1959 in Liverpool, but moved to the Cantril Farm district as a child during the 1960s. He attended St Dominic's Roman Catholic school in Huyton along with his twin sister.

== Career ==
Rutherford emerged from the 1970s punk scene in Merseyside, finding initial fame with the Spitfire Boys, one of the members of which was Budgie (later of Siouxsie and the Banshees). The Spitfire Boys released the single "British Refugee/Mein Kampf". The A-side of the single, which opens with the line "He came from Northern Ireland with hate in his heart", describes the life of a Northern Irish immigrant in England who escaped from the British occupation of his country, and lived in poor working-class conditions.

=== Frankie Goes to Hollywood ===
Rutherford, at that time a member of Hambi and the Dance, joined Frankie Goes to Hollywood in 1982 after he met them performing at "Pickwicks, a pub in the centre of Liverpool". He sang backing vocals alongside Johnson and also danced, and provided some keyboard parts to the band's recordings. The band ended five years later, and Rutherford attempted a solo career – which was short-lived.

=== After Frankie Goes to Hollywood ===
Rutherford's 1988 song "Get Real", a collaboration with ABC, reached No. 47 in the UK and remained on the charts for four weeks.

Rutherford released a single, a cover of the Chic track "I Want Your Love", and an album, Oh World, in 1989, which were unsuccessful commercially. He released another single, "That Moon", as Paul Rutherford with Pressure Zone in 1991, and worked as a stylist for bands. He appeared in the music videos for "Walking on Broken Glass" (1992) by Annie Lennox and "Give In to Me" (1993) by Michael Jackson.

In late 2010, he released the album The Cowboy Years under the name Paul Rutherford/Butt Cowboys.

== Personal life ==
Rutherford and his civil union partner Perry live in New Zealand.

== Discography ==
=== Solo albums ===
- Oh World (1989)
- The Cowboy Years (2010)

=== Extended plays ===
- That Moon (with the Pressure Zone) (1989)

=== Singles ===
- The Spitfire Boys; "British Refugee/Mein Kampf" RKO Records, 7 October 1977
- "Get Real" (1988) - UK #47
- "I Want Your Love" (1989) - UK #82
- "Oh World" (1989) - UK #61
