= Eric's Club =

Music club in United Kingdom

Coordinates: 53.4063°N 2.9877°W

Eric's Club Liverpool
- Liverpool band The Moondogs (later The English) outside Eric's Club entrance, 1977
- Interactive map of Eric's Club Liverpool
- Location: Mathew Street, Liverpool, United Kingdom
- Owner: Roger Eagle, Ken Testi, Pete Fulwell
- Capacity: 550
- Type: Music club
- Event: Night club

Construction
- Opened: 1 October 1976
- Closed: 14 March 1980

Website
- ericsclubliverpool.com

'Friday & Saturdays at The Revolution' plus Eric's Membership Application Form February 1977

Eric's was a music club in Liverpool, United Kingdom, started by Roger Eagle and Ken Testi and operating from 1976 to 1980. The club was given the name 'Eric's' by Ken Testi as an antidote to disco clubs with names such as 'Tiffany's' and 'Samantha's'.

Roger Eagle had previously booked bands and DJ'ed at the Magic Village and Twisted Wheel in Manchester before moving to Liverpool where he booked bands such as T Rex, Led Zeppelin, Chuck Berry, Captain Beefheart, David Bowie, The Kinks, and Lou Reed between 1970-76 at the Liverpool Stadium, a 3500-capacity boxing arena.

Ken Testi, present-day manager of Deaf School started booking bands when still at school, and previously tour managed Deaf School and pre-Queen Freddie Mercury.

They were joined a few months later by Pete Fulwell, who went on to manage Liverpool bands It's Immaterial and The Christians, and found Inevitable Records.

Initially Eric's operated on Friday nights out of Gatsby's and The Revolution, two clubs in the same building, a former Fruit Exchange. The main acts would appear at ground floor-level Gatsby's followed by the support going on stage later downstairs at The Revolution.

The entrance to Gatsby's was on Victoria Street with The Revolution entrance on the opposite side of the building in Mathew Street. For Eric's Club Nights, a Gatsby's fire exit further down Mathew Street became the main entrance to both venues with a temporary 'Eric's' sign propped-up on a chair beside the door. The club officially opened with The Stranglers on 1 October 1976, but had a pre-opening with Deaf School on 3 August 1976.

The Stranglers were followed the next week by The Runaways and then the Sex Pistols. There was so much smashed glass in the dressing room after the Sex Pistols played that Gatsby's owner Roy Adams banned any further acts upstairs. The Revolution then became the sole Eric's Club Night venue with the entrance reverting to The Revolution's main door further up Mathew Street.

From January 1977 Eric's Club nights expanded to Fridays & Saturdays. Roger Eagle and Ken Testi were joined by Pete Fulwell in March 1977 and the trio took over the freehold of Cavern Enterprises, which included The Revolution, and the club was renamed 'Eric's' with bands now playing most, if not every, night of the week.

For bigger acts Eric's would use larger venues such as Mountford Hall (Liverpool Guild of Students), Liverpool's Empire Theatre and Philharmonic Hall, Manchester Polytechnic, Newcastle City Hall, Golden Palms Blackburn and the Top Rank Suite Sheffield.

To launch Yachts debut album in May 1979, Eric's booked MV Royal Iris, a pleasure boat on the River Mersey, for a show featuring Yachts, Clive Langer & the Boxes and a surprise set from Elvis Costello.

From May 1978, in collaboration with Alan Wise ('Wise Moves'), Eric's booked Factory Nights at the Russell Club in Hulme, Manchester often showcasing acts in each city on consecutive nights.

== Eric's Factory Records ==
"So the origin of Factory records is a falling out over the format of this Manchester/Liverpool collaboration, who knows, if Roger hadn’t rung me at home saying will you do it, I might have been just a TV presenter".

— Anthony H Wilson

Following the 1977 release of the Big in Japan / Chuddy Nuddies' double A-side single Brutality, Religion and a Dance Beat on the Eric's label - and the success of the early Eric's Factory shows in Manchester - Roger Eagle suggested to Tony Wilson extending the collaboration to 'Eric's Factory Records'. Pete Fulwell provided the costings and business plan, but Tony Wilson decided to take the plan and continue the Factory Records project without Eric's.

== Music ==
The club's ethos was to showcase music of all kinds: dub, reggae, jazz, folk, blues, rockabilly, psychobilly, R&B, zydeco, punk/new wave, etc, as well as hosting travelling theatre groups. It played host to many local, national and international bands such as Elvis Costello, Buzzcocks, The Clash, Iggy Pop, Ramones, Sex Pistols, Siouxsie and the Banshees, John Cale, The Slits, Talking Heads, The Stranglers, Ultravox, Wire, XTC, X-Ray Spex and early gigs by Joy Division and Mick Hucknall (pre Simply Red in Frantic Elevators).

The club acted as a catalyst for local musicians from Liverpool, St Helens, Runcorn, Southport, Skelmersdale and the Wirral, and saw many local artists later become successful acts, including Dead or Alive, Echo & the Bunnymen, Julian Cope, The Teardrop Explodes, Orchestral Manoeuvres in the Dark (OMD), Ellery Bop and Wah! Heat.

A copy of a membership card.

To comply with licensing laws, Eric's was a members-only over-18s venue (with an annual membership fee of 50p when it opened), but the addition of alcohol-free Saturday matinee performances allowed under-18s the experience of seeing their favourite acts live. This was supported by the bands, welcomed by the under-18s and provided a networking venue for some of the city's future musicians. 'Special membership' for under-18s was free, rising to 10p in 1979.

== Closing ==
The club operated until March 1980 when it was raided by police for alleged drug offences. The final acts that night were The Psychedelic Furs supported by Wah! Heat. Wah! Heat's performance was recorded for a John Peel session, and the poem "The Last Night of Eric's (A small opera in the making)" was penned by Rob Jones. Later the club reopened as Bradys, to last some 12 months before closing.

== Current status ==
In 2011, thirty-one years after closing, a local businessman reopened the venue calling it 'Eric's' to benefit from the original club's past history and rich legacy, but without the culture and ethos of the original club. To add authenticity OMD were asked to play a one-off gig on the opening night.

== Eric's The Musical ==
A musical written by Mark Davies Markham (Liverpool-born author of West End hit Taboo) and directed by Jamie Lloyd, was performed at the Everyman Theatre Liverpool in September 2008.

== All the Best Clubs are Downstairs, Everyone Knows That ==
Liverpool Eric's: All the Best Clubs are Downstairs, Everyone Knows That written by Paul Whelan and Jaki Florek was published in April 2009. The book brings together research of the club and its history, extensive interviews with the people involved, plus a large amount of previously unpublished material from the time. It is published by Feeedback Publishing.
