= It's Immaterial =

English indie pop band

- Origin: Liverpool, England
- Genres: New wave, indie pop
- Years active: 1980–present
- Labels: Hit Machine, Inevitable, L.H.M., Eternal, Ark, Siren, Virgin
- Members: John Campbell; Jarvis Whitehead
- Past members: Paul Barlow; Martin Dempsey; Henry Priestman

It's Immaterial are an English indie pop band from Liverpool, England, formed in 1980. They are best known for their 1986 single "Driving Away from Home (Jim's Tune)", which reached number 18 on the UK Singles Chart.

== Career ==
It's Immaterial were formed by three former members of Yachts – Mancunian John Campbell (vocals), Martin Dempsey (guitar), and Henry Priestman (keyboards) – in addition to Paul Barlow (drums). By 1984, the band had been reduced to a duo – Campbell and Jarvis Whitehead, on guitar and keyboards, who joined in 1982.

On 11 November 1981, around the time of the release of the band’s third single, It's Immaterial recorded the first of four sessions for John Peel at BBC Radio 1. The track listing was "A Gigantic Raft (In the Philippines)", "Imitate the Worm", "White Man's Hut", and "Rake". "A Gigantic Raft" was featured on the soundtrack of Jonathan Demme's 2004 The Manchurian Candidate.

In April 1985, the band recorded their fourth and final John Peel session, with the tracks: "Rope", "Hang On Sleepy Town", "Space" and "Festival Time". In the same month, the band's Fish Waltz EP reached number 30 on the UK Indie Chart.

Less than a year later the band had a hit single with "Driving Away from Home (Jim's Tune)". This song was their biggest hit and has since featured widely on television advertisements and on 1980s-based compilation albums.

Another minor hit followed, "Ed's Funky Diner (Friday Night, Saturday Morning)", with accompanying video, before the release of the band's debut album, Life's Hard and Then You Die, in September 1986.

In 1990, they released their second album Song. As before, the music was of a subdued, understated nature, with wry wit in the manner of an indie Pet Shop Boys. The album was a commercial flop, despite receiving positive reviews in the music press. The album was produced by Calum Malcolm, best known for his work with Glasgow band the Blue Nile. In the same year as Song, former It's Immaterial keyboard player Henry Priestman had a UK number one album The Christians with the band of the same name.

In 1993, the band started to work on a new album which remained uncompleted for many years. Since 2010 some unreleased songs from the album have appeared on different internet music channels: "Just North of Here", "New Moon", "Is It Alright (Between Us)", "House for Sale" and "How Can I Tell You".

A deluxe edition of their album Life's Hard and Then You Die was released on 1 July 2016. The double-CD issue contains the original album remastered plus bonus tracks of single versions, B-sides, remixes and one of the group's John Peel sessions.

On 23 September 2016, the group launched the campaign to produce and release their "lost and found" album House for Sale via Pledge Music. The pledge target was reached, although an initial tentative release date of spring 2017 was later postponed to early 2018. The album was finally released on 18 September 2020, through Burning Shed Distribution.

== Discography ==
=== Studio albums ===
Year	Title	Chart positions	
Year	Title	UK	AUS
1986	Life's Hard and Then You Die: Label: Siren	62	100
1990	Song: Label: Siren	—	
2020	House for Sale: Label: Burning Shed	—	—

=== Singles and EPs ===
Year	Title	Chart positions
Year	Title	UK
1980	"Young Man (Seeks Interesting Job)" "Doosha (A Success Story)": Label: Hit Machine	—
1981	"A Gigantic Raft (In the Philippines)" "No Place for a Prompter": Label: Inevitable	—
1981	"Imitate the Worm" "The Worm Turns": Label: L.H.M	—
1982	"A Gigantic Raft (In the Philippines)": Label: Wonderful World	—
1983	"White Man's Hut" "The Worm Turns" "Solid Piles of Food": Label: Eternal	—
1984	"A Gigantic Raft (In the Philippines)" "The Mermaid": Label: Eternal	—
1985	Fish Waltz (EP) "The Better Idea (Push the Boat Out)" "Several Brothers" "Lullaby" "Fish Waltz": Label: Ark	—
1985	"Ed's Funky Diner": Label: Siren	-
1986	"Driving Away from Home (Jim's Tune)": Label: Siren	18
1986	"Ed's Funky Diner (Friday Night, Saturday Morning)": Label: Siren	65
1986	"Space": Label: Siren	—
1987	"Rope": Label: Siren	—
1988	Driving Away from Home (CD EP): Label: Virgin	—
1990	"Heaven Knows": Label: Siren	—
