= Jayne Casey =

English artistic director

- Also known as: Jayne
- Born: 1956 (age 68–69); Wallasey, Cheshire, England
- Genres: Punk rock, new wave, synthpop, post-punk
- Occupation(s): Musician (retired), artist director
- Instrument: Vocals
- Years active: 1977–1987

Jayne Casey (born 1956, in Wallasey, Cheshire) is an English artistic director who was known for being involved in the Liverpool punk and new wave scene in the 1970s and 1980s, with Big in Japan, Pink Military and Pink Industry. A Keychange Inspiration Award was presented to Casey at Liverpool Sound City.

== Biography ==
=== Big In Japan ===
After she left home at 14, and being interested in Andy Warhol and Lou Reed, she joined one of the first punk bands in Liverpool, Big In Japan, in mid-1977. She was notorious for her shaved head. The band explored various styles whilst together such as punk, power pop and post-punk. After two years, they split up in 1978, but reunited for three Peel sessions in early 1979. The group comprised several now well-known artists, such as Holly Johnson, who later was the frontman of Frankie Goes To Hollywood; Bill Drummond, later member of The KLF; Ian Broudie, known for his Britpop/alternative band The Lightning Seeds; and Budgie, drummer in Siouxsie and the Banshees.

=== Pink Military ===
After Big In Japan split up, Casey formed Pink Military, who recorded the album Do Animals Believe in God?.

=== Pink Industry ===
She formed Pink Industry, a synthpop band, at the end of 1981. Pink Industry was formed with her fellow Big In Japan bandmate, Ambrose Reynolds, and the electric guitarist, Tadzio Jodlowski. The band recorded and toured widely in the UK and Europe in the early 1980s, developing a devoted cult following. They did four session recordings for John Peel and performed with bands such as The Cocteau Twins and The Jesus and Mary Chain. They disbanded in 1987 after releasing three albums.

=== Quotes ===
"Nothing that's got any potency is ever accepted by the established art world at the moment of potency... it's only in retrospect that they're kinda able to assimilate it into their culture.." (Jayne Casey on the KLF)
