= Deaf School =

English art rock/new wave band

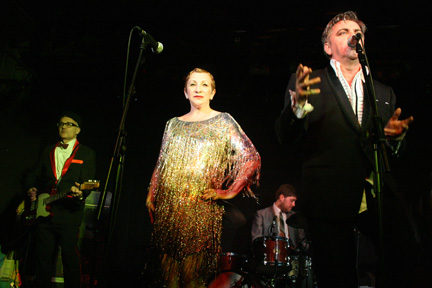
- Deaf School at The Garage, London : 28 January 2011

Background information
- Origin: Liverpool Art College, England
- Genres: Art pop; art rock; new wave; cabaret; power pop
- Years active: 1974–1978, 1988–1989, 2009–present
- Website: deafschool.co.uk

Deaf School is an English art rock/new wave band, formed in Liverpool in January 1974.

== Overview ==
Between 1976 and 1978, the year in which they split up, Deaf School recorded three albums for the Warner Brothers label. The first album's art rock style had roots in cabaret, and later releases moved towards a harder punk rock sound. Deaf School have been recognized as an important influence on many British musicians. According to Frankie Goes to Hollywood singer Holly Johnson: "They revived Liverpool music for a generation." The journalist, author and founder of Mojo, Paul Du Noyer, went further: "In the whole history of Liverpool music two bands matter most, one is The Beatles and the other is Deaf School."

Nearly all the group's members went on to enjoy successful careers, notably guitarist Clive Langer, who produced Madness and Dexys Midnight Runners, two non-Liverpool acts which cite Deaf School as an influence. Langer also co-wrote (with Elvis Costello) the song "Shipbuilding".

== History ==
Formed by students and staff at Liverpool Art College, Deaf School were named after its rehearsal venue, a former school for the deaf that had become a college annexe. Their initial aim was to play the college's 1973 Christmas dance. The group's lead male vocalist, Enrico Cadillac Jnr recalls that "Anyone who wanted to be in it could be. There were about 13 on stage at that time. No one could play – it was based on people we thought were interesting . . we entered (and) . . won the Melody Maker rock and folk contest and were suddenly a big deal. We signed to Warners because their A&R guy, Derek Taylor, had been The Beatles publicist and when he saw us rehearsing in Mathew Street, he cried his eyes out".

The informal early line-up was gradually whittled down, though live shows were still chaotic and colourful, marked by their diversity of costumes and instrumentation, with strong elements of performance art. Deaf School's debut album, 2nd Honeymoon, was released in the UK in August 1976, and the band was officially a nonet: vocalists Bette Bright, Enrico Cadillac Jnr and Eric Shark; guitarists Clive Langer and Paul Pilnick; keyboardist Rev. Max Ripple; sax player Ian Richie; bassist Steve "Mr. Average" Lindsey; and drummer Tim Whittaker.

Pilnick dropped out of the band as the album was being completed, but is still pictured with the group on the debut album and listed as a band member. The album's reception at the time was muted by the sudden popularity of punk rock, a style whose anger and urgency seemed at odds with Deaf School's more whimsical and eclectic approach. The band itself -- now an octet -- appeared to address this problem on subsequent albums Don’t Stop The World (1977) and English Boys/Working Girls (1978), which were more aggressive and focused. Despite some lavish promotion by Warner Brothers and their continued popularity as a live act, Deaf School did not achieve significant chart success. In 1977, their first two albums were re-packaged together for the US market, and several American dates were played in support, but no commercial breakthrough was made. By mutual consent Deaf School left Warner Brothers in 1978 and pursued separate careers.

Deaf School biography by Paul Du Noyer, artwork by Steve Hardstaff

On disbanding, several members continued working in the music industry. Singer Bette Bright led her own band The Illuminations (and married the lead singer of Madness, Suggs). Clive Langer became one of the foremost record producers of the 1980s and 1990s, working with Madness, Morrissey, David Bowie, Dexys Midnight Runners and Bush amongst others. Bassist Steve Lindsey formed The Planets, scoring a Top of the Pops appearance with his song "Lines". Enrico Cadillac Jnr (real name Steve Allen) joined Ian Broudie (former member of Big in Japan) to form the Original Mirrors who released two albums. Allen later formed The Perils of Plastic with former Attractions keyboard player Steve Nieve, before going onto a successful pan-European solo career, later taking on the management of Espiritu as well as an A&R post with Warner Bros. Records from 1993 to 2004. Ian Ritchie became a prolific composer, producer and session player. Eric Shark went on to work with Geoff Davies and set up Probe Plus, responsible for Half Man Half Biscuit amongst others.

In 1988, most former Deaf School members reunited for live dates, with one of their Liverpool performances released as a live album, 2nd Coming, produced by Langer and Julian Wheatley. The band swelled to a ten-piece, with returning members Bright, Cadillac, Langer, Linsdey, Ripple, and Shark, and new members Reeves Gabrels (Tin Machine, Rubber Rodeo) on guitar, Gary Barnacle and Lee Thompson (Madness) on saxes, and Martin Hughes (Any Trouble) on drums. Ian Ritchie, Tim Whittaker and Paul Pilnick were not involved in the reunion. Nick Lowe was the supporting act at the shows. Suggs also performed a surprise rendition of the Madness song "My Girl" with the band at one of their shows.

Tim Whittaker died in 1996 but ten years later, in May 2006, the remaining members of Deaf School (except Pilnick) reformed for more concerts, culminating in an oversubscribed show in Liverpool for the reopening of the New Picket in the newly formed Independent District on 27 May. In September 2007 Deaf School reunited again and played several live shows including a warm up at The Dublin Castle pub in Camden Town followed by the Manchester Academy and the Carling Academy Liverpool. In December 2007 they played again at the Indigo2 venue at The O2 in London for Madness's aftershow party. Suggs said, "In Madness we’d all listened to Deaf School records. Their first album was a big phenomenon in our lives. In 1975 they played at the Roundhouse in Camden, which was the greatest music venue in the world as far as we were concerned, and I was bowled over by them..". In September 2009 the band did shows at The Dublin Castle and The Garage in London before returning to Liverpool for four sell-out concerts at The Everyman Theatre, and an appearance at The Hope Street Festival. The three Deaf School studio albums were re-mastered and released in September 2009 on Cherry Red's Lemon label.

The full band augmented by ex-Crackout drummer Nicholas Millard, played 'The Deaf School Xmas Bash' shows in December 2009 at the 100 Club in London, and the Liverpool O2 Academy, making it ten live appearances in 2009, a first since the 1970s.

Band member Thomas Sam Davis (aka Eric Shark) died, aged 59, on 7 January 2010, from lung disease. The band played two concerts in Liverpool in April in tribute, featuring guests such as Suggs, Ian Broudie and Kevin Rowland. A new Deaf School single, "The Survivor Song", co-written by Eric Shark appeared the same year,

Deaf School announced nine live dates aka 'The Listen & Learn Tour' in early 2011 including The Garage London and dates in Sheffield, Manchester, Birmingham, Glasgow and Liverpool culminating in two shows in Tokyo. A mini album, entitled Enrico & Bette xx was released in 2011 containing five new songs, "You Turn Away", "I Know I Know", "The Enrico Song", "Goodbye To All That" and "Scary Girlfriend".

Deaf School album LAUNDERETTE

Deaf School again appeared at The Everyman Theatre Liverpool for two emotionally charged 'Goodbye to the Everyman' shows as part of the refurbishment closure events, and played the Port Eliot festival July 2011.

A history by Paul Du Noyer, Deaf School: the Non-Stop Pop Art Punk Rock Party, was published in the UK by the Liverpool University Press in October 2013, to mark the 40th anniversary of the band's formation.

In 2013, Gregg Braden joined the band as permanent drummer. Deaf School's next album, Launderette, was released in Japan on 27 May 2015 by Hyabusa Landings. The album features seven new studio tracks alongside five tracks recorded live at the Floral Pavilion in New Brighton in November 2014, along with a bonus track from 1987 featuring Eric Shark on lead vocals.

A full-length studio album of new material, entitled Let's Do This Again Next Week - Deaf School's first full-length album of completely new material in 39 years - was released in December 2017, featuring new songs written by the band in various formations. Although still a member of the band, tour commitments with Roger Waters (with whom he has collaborated for three decades) meant that Ian Ritchie was unable to contribute to the recordings; the band for the album consisted of Braden, Bright, Cadillac, Langer, Lindsey and Ripple. A short tour in support of the album, featuring the full seven-person lineup of the band (i.e, including Ritchie), followed the same month.

Early Deaf School guitarist Paul Pilnick died in 2021.

In November 2022, Deaf School reformed to play London's 100 Club, followed by shows in Brighton and Liverpool, featuring all the living members of the original line up, with Gregg Braden on drums. The same line up played dates in 2023 and November 2024. Langer, Braden and Ripple also still perform as part of The Clang Group with a new LP and February 2025 dates announced.

== Band members ==
- Bette Bright (birth name Anne Martin) - vocals
- Enrico Cadillac Jnr (birth name Steve Allen) - vocals
- Eric Shark (birth name Thomas John "Sam" Davis) - vocals (b.1950 – d. 7 Jan 2010)
- Ian Ritchie - woodwind instruments
- Max Ripple (birth name John Wood) - keyboards
- Cliff Hanger (birth name Clive Langer) - guitar
- Steve "Average" Lindsey - bass guitar
- Tim Whittaker - drums (b. Timothy John Whittaker, 8 October 1952, Clitheroe, Lancashire – d. 20 July 1996, Liverpool
- Gregg Braden - drums 2013 – present

== Discography ==
=== Studio Albums ===
- 1976: 2nd Honeymoon (AUS #63)
- 1977: Don't Stop the World
- 1978: English Boys/Working Girls
- 2011: Enrico & Bette xx
- 2015: Launderette
- 2017: Let's Do This Again Next Week

==== Live Albums ====
- 1988: 2nd Coming: Liverpool '88
- 2026: LIVErpool '23

==== Compilation Albums ====
- 2003: What a Way to End It All: The Anthology
- 2021: Parigi My Dear

=== Singles ===
- 1976: "What a Way to End It All"/"Nearly Moonlit Night Motel" (AUS #72)
- 1977: "Taxi"/"Last Night"
- 1978: "All Queued Up"/"Golden Showers"
- 1978: "Thunder and Lightning" / "Working Girls'"
- 2011: "The Survivor Song"
- 2017: "Bed & Breakfast"/"Loving You"
