= Big in Japan (band) =

English punk band

- Origin: Liverpool, England
- Genres: Punk rock; post-punk
- Years active: 1977–1978; 1979
- Label: Zoo
- Past members: Bill Drummond; Kevin Ward; Phil Allen; Jayne Casey; Ian Broudie; Clive Langer; Ambrose Reynolds; Holly Johnson; Budgie; Steve Lindsey; David Balfe

Big in Japan were a short-lived punk rock band formed in Liverpool in 1977. Its members are better known for their later successes than for their time in the band as they went on to find fame with acts such as Siouxsie and the Banshees, Echo & the Bunnymen, the Teardrop Explodes, Frankie Goes to Hollywood, the KLF, and the Lightning Seeds, leading the Liverpool Echo to describe the band as "a supergroup with a difference—its members only became super after they left".

== History ==
Big in Japan began from the same Merseyside scene that would produce Echo & the Bunnymen, the Teardrop Explodes, Orchestral Manoeuvres in the Dark, and Dalek I Love You. It took its name from the expression "big in Japan", which denotes Western bands who become more popular in Japan than other parts of the world, including their own countries.

Big in Japan started off playing gigs in Liverpool and the surrounding areas, such as Ruffwood School in Kirkby along with Wah! Heat, but most notably at Eric's Club. Their stage show was unique: lead singer Jayne Casey would perform with a lampshade over her shaved head, guitarist Bill Drummond wore a kilt, and bassist Holly Johnson performed in a flamboyant manner that he would later take further in Frankie Goes to Hollywood.

As an initial idea of Deaf School's Clive Langer, his friend Bill Drummond (guitar, vocals), Kevin Ward (bass, vocals), and Phil Allen (drums) formed the band in May 1977, playing only three gigs, the first of them at Bretton Hall College in Yorkshire. In August, the line-up grew to include Jayne Casey (vocals), Ian Broudie (guitar), and Clive Langer (guitar), who quit in September, but not before the band recorded their first song, "Big in Japan", which appeared on the split single "Brutality, Religion and a Dance Beat" released the same year. In October, Ambrose Reynolds joined to replace Ward who then left that December, but Reynolds himself quit shortly afterwards and was replaced by Johnson.

In January 1978, Budgie (previously in the Spitfire Boys and later a member of the Slits and Siouxsie and the Banshees) replaced Allen on drums. In early June, Johnson was replaced with ex-Deaf School member Steve Lindsey, who was in turn replaced in July by Dave Balfe (previously in Dalek I Love You), the last member to join.

Hatred of the band reached such a level that a petition calling on them to split up was launched by a jealous young Julian Cope resulting from a rivalry with the Crucial Three. Displayed in local shop Probe Records, the petition gathered numerous signatures, including those of the band themselves. According to Cope's autobiography, "Of course, Bill Drummond was into the whole thing and told us we needed 14,000 signatures, then they'd split up. We got about nine." In the 1980s, Drummond became the manager of Cope's band the Teardrop Explodes.

The band broke up after a last gig at Eric's on 26 August 1978. During their time, Big in Japan recorded four songs which were included on the From Y to Z and Never Again EP, released after their split to pay off their debts. The unintentional consequence of the EP's release was the formation of Zoo Records, which went on to release early material by Echo & the Bunnymen and the Teardrop Explodes, amongst others. They also recorded a Peel session on 12 February 1979 with a line-up of Casey, Broudie, Johnson, and Budgie; the session was broadcast on 6 March 1979. Balfe and Drummond then formed the short-lived Lori and the Chameleons.

Big in Japan left a legacy of just seven recorded songs: one on a single, four on From Y to Z and Never Again, and two released on compilation albums. As of 2005, only five of these recorded songs are commercially available, on the compilation album The Zoo: Uncaged 1978–1982.

The debut single by German band Alphaville was "Big in Japan", named after the band. Coincidentally, Frankie Goes to Hollywood's single "Relax" was knocked off the top of the German charts by the song in 1984. Frontman Marian Gold later said, "We never got to speak with him [Holly Johnson] but he must have wondered, 'Who is this German group with a song named after my band?'"

=== Former members' memories ===
Jayne Casey later stated, "We were all a bit too eccentric at a time when punk was quite macho and clear cut... a bit too much for people to handle. We always wanted to be like the Monkees or something. We wanted to be a cartoon, and that's how we tried to sell ourselves to the record companies."

Ian Broudie later said, "It was more performance art than rock and roll. But it gave me a healthy disregard for musicianship. It's ideas that are important, not proficiency."

Bill Drummond later recalled, "The group only lasted 12 months but that's about as long as any punk band should last. We never got anywhere, but all went on to success later on with bands like Siouxsie and the Banshees and the Teardrop Explodes."

== Discography ==
=== Singles and EPs ===
- "Brutality, Religion and a Dance Beat" (Eric's, September 1977) – "Big In Japan" / "Do The Chud"
- From Y to Z and Never Again (Zoo, 1978)

=== Compilations ===
- Street to Street: A Liverpool Album (1978) – "Match of the Day"
- To the Shores of Lake Placid (1982) – "Suicide a Go Go" / "Society for Cutting Up Men"
- The Zoo: Uncaged 1978–1982 (1990) – "Nothing Special" / "Cindy & the Valley of the Barbie Dolls" / "Suicide a Go Go" / "Taxi" / "Society for Cutting Up Men"

=== Other work ===
Three unreleased songs were recorded for the band's only John Peel session of 6 March 1979; "Suicide High Life", "Goodbye" and "Don't Bomb China".

A bootleg CD is in circulation which contains all of the material listed above as well as demo versions of "Society for Cutting Up Men" (named after the manifesto Society for Cutting Up Men), "Boys Cry", "Big in Japan", "Space Walk", "Match of the Day" and "Taxi". It also contains the audio from the band's performance of "Suicide a Go Go" on their Granada TV appearance of 23 March 1978 (on Tony Wilson's, So It Goes).

Black-and-white, amateur home movie footage of the band performing live at Eric's still exists—excerpts of the band performing both "Big in Japan" and "Cindy and the Barbi Dolls" were used in the BBC Television's Rock Family Trees: The New Merseybeat, originally broadcast in August 1995 and repeated in 1997.

== Band members ==
- Bill Drummond – guitar, vocals (May 1977– 26 August 1978)
- Phil Allen – drums (May 1977 – January 1978)
- Kev Ward – bass, vocals (May – December 1977)
- Clive Langer – guitar (May – September 1977)
- Jayne Casey – vocals (August 1977– 26 August 1978, 12 February 1979)
- Ian Broudie – guitar (August 1977– 26 August 1978, 12 February 1979)
- Ambrose Reynolds – bass (October 1977 – December 1977)
- Holly Johnson – bass, vocals (December 1977– June 1978, 12 February 1979)
- Budgie – drums (January 1978, 1979)
- Steve Lindsey – bass (May – July 1978)
- David Balfe – bass (July – 26 August 1978)
