= More Songs to Learn and Sing =

Greatest hits album by Echo & the Bunnymen
- Released: 11 September 2006
- Recorded: 1979–2005
- Genre: Post-punk; alternative rock
- Length: 76:16
- Label: Korova
- Producer: Echo & the Bunnymen

Echo & the Bunnymen chronology
Instant Live: House of Blues – San Diego, CA, 12/9/05 (2006)	More Songs to Learn and Sing (2006)	Me, I'm All Smiles (2006)

Professional ratings
Review scores
Source	Rating
AllMusic	link

More Songs to Learn and Sing is a compilation album by Echo & the Bunnymen. Released on 11 September 2006, it is an update to the 1985 singles collection Songs to Learn & Sing. A number of tracks have been added to cover the band's career until 2005's Siberia, and one track, "The Puppet", was removed.

== Track listing ==
CD

No.	Title	Album	Length
1.	"The Cutter"	Porcupine (1983)	3:53
2.	"The Back of Love"	Porcupine	3:13
3.	"The Killing Moon"	Ocean Rain (1984)	5:45
4.	"Seven Seas"	Ocean Rain	3:19
5.	"Never Stop"	non-album single (1983)	3:31
6.	"Rescue"	Crocodiles (1980)	4:26
7.	"I Want to Be There (When You Come)"	Evergreen (1997)	3:39
8.	"Don't Let It Get You Down"	Evergreen	3:50
9.	"A Promise"	Heaven Up Here (1981)	4:02
10.	"Silver"	Ocean Rain	3:19
11.	"People Are Strange"	The Lost Boys: Original Motion Picture Soundtrack (1987)	3:38
12.	"Do It Clean"	Crocodiles (US version)	2:44
13.	"The Game"	Echo & the Bunnymen (1987)	3:51
14.	"Rust"	What Are You Going to Do with Your Life? (1999)	4:15
15.	"Lips Like Sugar"	Echo & the Bunnymen	4:51
16.	"Nothing Lasts Forever"	Evergreen	3:55
17.	"Bring On the Dancing Horses"	Songs to Learn & Sing (1985)	3:55

Bonus Tracks 2001-2006

No.	Title	Album	Length
18.	"Hang on to a Dream"	Avalanche (2000)	2:24
19.	"It's Alright"	Flowers (2001)	3:26
20.	"Stormy Weather"	Siberia (2005)	4:22

DVD

1. "The Cutter"
2. "The Killing Moon"
3. "Seven Seas"
4. "Bring On the Dancing Horses"
5. "The Game"
6. "Lips Like Sugar"
7. "Nothing Lasts Forever"
8. "Rust"

== Charts ==
Chart (2006)	Peak position
Scottish Albums (OCC)	35
UK Albums (OCC)	47
