= The Works (Echo & the Bunnymen album) =

Box set by Echo & the Bunnymen
- Released: 31 March 2008
- Genre: Post-punk
- Label: Rhino

Echo & the Bunnymen chronology
| B-sides & Live (2001 – 2005) (2007) | The Works (2008) | The Fountain (2008) |

Professional ratings
Review scores
| Source | Rating |
|---|---|
| Allmusic | 4/5 stars |

The Works is a boxed set compilation album by Echo & the Bunnymen, which was released on 31 March 2008.

== Track listing ==
=== Disc 1 ===
1. "Rescue"
2. "A Promise"
3. "Do It Clean"
4. "Villiers Terrace"
5. "All That Jazz"
6. "Over the Wall"
7. "The Disease"
8. "Going Up"
9. "Happy Death Men"
10. "Pride"
11. "The Puppet"
12. "Show of Strength"
13. "Turquoise Days"
14. "No Dark Things"
15. "With a Hip"

=== Disc 2 ===
1. "The Killing Moon"
2. "The Cutter"
3. "The Back of Love"
4. "Never Stop"
5. "Silver"
6. "Seven Seas"
7. "Bring On the Dancing Horses"
8. "Clay"
9. "Porcupine"
10. "Ripeness"
11. "Gods Will Be Gods"
12. "My Kingdom"
13. "Crystal Days"
14. "Nocturnal Me"
15. "Thorn Of Crowns"

=== Disc 3 ===
1. "Nothing Lasts Forever"
2. "The Game"
3. "Lips Like Sugar"
4. "Bedbugs and Ballyhoo"
5. "People Are Strange"
6. "Rust"
7. "Don't Let It Get You Down"
8. "I Want to Be There (When You Come)"
9. "All In Your Mind"
10. "Over You"
11. "All My Life"
12. "What Are You Going To Do With Your Life"
13. "When It All Blows Over"
14. "Get in the Car"
15. "Baby Rain"
