= Me, I'm All Smiles =

2006 live compilation album by Echo & the Bunnymen

Live album by Echo & the Bunnymen
- Released: 18 September 2006
- Recorded: 1 November 2005
- Genres: Post-punk, alternative rock
- Label: Snapper Music

Echo & the Bunnymen chronology
| More Songs to Learn and Sing (2006) | Me, I'm All Smiles (2006) | Killing Moon: The Best of Echo & the Bunnymen (2007) |

Me, I'm All Smiles is a live compilation of Echo & the Bunnymen songs recorded in London in 2005, released in September 2006. It finishes, like their 1984 album Ocean Rain, with the track "Ocean Rain". The cover artwork features sunflowers.

Professional ratings
Review scores
| Source | Rating |
|---|---|
| Allmusic | link |

== Track listing ==
1. "Going Up"
2. "With a Hip"
3. "Stormy Weather"
4. "Show of Strength"
5. "Bring on the Dancing Horses"
6. "The Disease"
7. "Scissors in the Sand"
8. "All That Jazz"
9. "The Back of Love"
10. "The Killing Moon"
11. "In the Margins"
12. "Never Stop"
13. "Villiers Terrace"
14. "Of a Life"
15. "Rescue"
16. "The Cutter"
17. "Nothing Lasts Forever"
18. "Lips Like Sugar"
19. "Ocean Rain"

== Charts ==
| Chart (2006) | Peak position |
|---|---|
| UK Independent Albums (Official Charts) | 40 |
