= B-sides & Live (2001–2005) =

Compilation album by Echo & the Bunnymen
- Released: 3 December 2007
- Genre: Post-punk, alternative rock
- Label: Cooking Vinyl

Echo & the Bunnymen chronology
Killing Moon: The Best of Echo & the Bunnymen (2007)	B-sides & Live (2001–2005) (2007)	The Works (2008)

B-sides & Live (2001–2005) is a compilation album by Echo & the Bunnymen, which was released on 3 December 2007 and initially only available as an MP3 download. It was later reissued physically for Record Store Day in 2022.

== Track listing ==
1. "Marble Towers" (Bonus track from Japanese version of Flowers) – 4.05
2. "Scratch the Past" (Bonus track from Japanese version of Flowers) – 4.09
3. "Rescue" (Mindwinder's Remix) – 6.33
4. "A Promise" (Lo Fi Lullabye #1) – 5.16
5. "Supermellow Man" (Instrumental) – 5.34
6. "Ticket to Ride" 3.21
7. "What If We Are" (Vocal & String Version) – 5.09
8. "Stormy Weather" (Instrumental Version) – 4.31
9. "Make Me Shine" (Acoustic) – 3.12
10. "Nothing Lasts Forever" (Acoustic, Brazil) – 4.10
11. "In the Margins" (Instrumental) – 5.39
12. "Villiers Terrace" (Live) – 5.28
13. "In the Margins" (Live at Reading Festival 2005) – 4.56
14. "Nothing Lasts Forever" (Live at Reading Festival 2005) – 5.57
15. "Killing Moon" (Live at Reading Festival 2005) – 4.44
16. "Lips Like Sugar" (Live at Reading Festival 2005) – 4.30

== Charts ==
Chart (2022)	Peak position
Scottish Albums (Official Charts)	77
UK Independent Albums (Official Charts)	24
