= Killing Moon: The Best of Echo & the Bunnymen =

Compilation album by Echo & the Bunnymen
- Released: 3 December 2007
- Genre: Post-punk
- Label: Music Club Deluxe

Echo & the Bunnymen chronology
| Me, I'm All Smiles (2006) | Killing Moon: The Best of Echo & the Bunnymen (2007) | B-sides & Live (2001–2005) (2007) |

Professional ratings
Review scores
| Source | Rating |
|---|---|
| AllMusic | 4/5 stars |

Killing Moon: The Best of Echo & the Bunnymen is a compilation album by Echo & the Bunnymen, which was released on 3 December 2007 on the Music Club Deluxe label.

== Track listing ==
=== Disc one ===
1. "Pictures on My Wall" – 2.55
2. "The Puppet" – 3.07
3. "Do it Clean" – 2.47
4. "Crocodiles" – 2.40
5. "Rescue" – 4.30
6. "All That Jazz" – 2.48
7. "Villiers Terrace" – 2.47
8. "Show of Strength" – 4.50
9. "Over the Wall" – 6.01
10. "A Promise" – 4.06
11. "With a Hip" – 3.18
12. "All My Colours" – 4.04
13. "The Cutter" – 3.55
14. "The Back of Love" – 3.16
15. "Higher Hell" – 5.02
16. "Gods Will Be Gods" – 5.27
17. "Never Stop" – 3.33
18. "Heads Will Roll" – 3.32

=== Disc two ===
1. "The Killing Moon" – 5.49
2. "Silver" – 3.22
3. "Angels and Devils" – 4.24
4. "Ocean Rain" – 5.13
5. "My Kingdom" – 4.07
6. "Seven Seas" – 3.22
7. "Crystal Days" – 2.26
8. "Bring On the Dancing Horses" – 4.00
9. "People Are Strange" – 3.38
10. "Bedbugs and Ballyhoo" – 3.30
11. "The Game" – 3.53
12. "Lost and Found" – 3.39
13. "Thorn of Crowns" – 4.54
14. "Lips Like Sugar" – 4.54
15. "Zimbo" (Live) – 3.56
16. "Do It Clean" (Live) – 6.36
17. "Ocean Rain" (Live) – 5.19
18. "The Killing Moon" (Live) – 3.25

== Charts ==
| Chart (2008–10) | Peak position |
|---|---|
| UK Independent Albums (OCC) | 18 |

== Certifications ==
| Region | Certification | Certified units/sales |
|---|---|---|
| United Kingdom (BPI) | Silver | 60,000^{^} |
^{^} Shipments figures based on certification alone.
