= Bombon =

Bombon may refer to:

- Bombon, Camarines Sur, a municipality in the Philippines
- Bombon, Seine-et-Marne, a commune in France
- Bombon (movie), a 2004 Argentine-Spanish drama film

== See also ==
- Bombones, a Spanish pop band
- Bombón (disambiguation)
- Bonbon (disambiguation)
