= Bombón =

Bombón is the Spanish word for bonbon. It may also refer to:

- "Bombón" (Leslie Shaw song), 2019
- "Bombón" (Daddy Yankee song), 2022
- "Bombón", a song by Bandana, 2017
- "Bombón", a song by Fey from Fey, 1995
- "Bombón", a song by Voltio from Voltio, 2005
- "Bombón I", otherwise known as "El Rey de Chocolate", a song by Francisco Gabilondo Soler ("Cri-Cri"), 1957
- Bombón: El Perro or Bombón: The Dog, English titles for 2004 Argentinean film El Perro
- Café bombón, a coffee drink containing espresso and sweetened condensed milk

== See also ==
- Bombon (disambiguation)
- Bonbon (disambiguation)
