= Les Bonbons =

Les Bonbons may refer to:

- Les Bonbons (album) by Jacques Brel
  - The title track from the above album.

== See also ==
- Bon Bon (disambiguation)
