= Scissors in the Sand =

2006 single by Echo & the Bunnymen

Single by Echo & the Bunnymen

from the album Siberia
- Released: 5 June 2006
- Genre: Alternative rock
- Length: 3:17
- Label: Cooking Vinyl
- Songwriters: Will Sergeant, Ian McCulloch
- Producer: Hugh Jones

Echo & the Bunnymen singles chronology
"In the Margins" (2005)	"Scissors in the Sand" (2006)	"Think I Need It Too" (2009)

"Scissors in the Sand" is a single by Echo & the Bunnymen which was released on 5 June 2006 on the Cooking Vinyl label. It was the third single to be released from the band's 2005 album, Siberia.

== Overview ==
Like their previous two singles, "Stormy Weather" and "In the Margins", and the parent album, this single was produced by Hugh Jones who had previously produced the band's 1981 album Heaven Up Here. The cover photograph was taken by Joe Dilworth. The live version of "Villiers Terrace" was taken from the band's 2005 appearance at the Reading Festival.

== Reception ==
Reviewing the single, Room Thirteen described the song as "classic Bunnymen", that the song compared to their mid-1980s releases and scored it with 11 out of 13. Reviewing the album Siberia, The Pitt News described "Scissors in the Sand" as the album's most ambitious and strongest track, the reviewer also states that the song sees McCulloch at his most intense and also comments favourably on Sergeant's guitar solo.

The single failed to chart.

== Track listings ==
1. "Scissors in the Sand" (radio edit) (Will Sergeant, Ian McCulloch) – 3:17
2. "In the Margins" (acoustic) (Sergeant, McCulloch) – 4:56
3. "Villiers Terrace" (live) (Sergeant, McCulloch, Les Pattinson, Pete de Freitas) – 5:28

== Personnel ==
=== Musicians ===
- Ian McCulloch – vocals, guitar
- Will Sergeant – lead guitar
- Peter Wilkinson – bass
- Paul Fleming – keyboards
- Simon Finley – drums

=== Production ===
- Hugh Jones – producer
- Joe Dilworth – photography
