= History Repeating =

History Repeating may refer to:

- "History Repeating" (Brothers and Sisters), a 2007 TV episode
- "History Repeating" (Casualty), a 2016 TV episode
- "History Repeating" (The Vampire Diaries), a 2009 TV episode
- "History Repeating" (song), a 1997 recording by Propellerheads featuring Shirley Bassey
- History Repeating: Blue, an album by The Megas

== See also ==
- "History Repeats", a 2019 song by Brittany Howard
- "History Repeats Itself", a 1966 song by Buddy Starcher
