= Killing Moon =

Killing Moon may refer to:

- "The Killing Moon", a 1984 song by Echo & the Bunnymen
- Killing Moon: The Best of Echo & the Bunnymen, a 2007 compilation album by Echo & the Bunnymen
- Killing Moon (band), a heavy metal band
- The Killing Moon (novel), a 2012 novel by N.K. Jemisin
- Killing Moon (novel), a 2022 novel by Jo Nesbø
- Killing Moon, a 2000 America television film starring Kim Coates

== See also ==
- Under a Killing Moon, a 1994 computer game
