= What Are You Going to Do with Your Life? =

Studio album by Echo & the Bunnymen
- Released: 5 April 1999
- Recorded: 1998 at various locations
- Genre: Alternative rock
- Length: 38:24
- Label: London
- Producer: Echo & the Bunnymen, Alan Douglas

Echo & the Bunnymen chronology
Evergreen (1997)	What Are You Going to Do with Your Life? (1999)	Flowers (2001)

Singles from What Are You Going to Do with Your Life?
- 1. "Rust" Released: March 1999; 2. "Get in the Car" Released: 1999

What Are You Going to Do with Your Life? is the eighth studio album by the English rock band Echo & the Bunnymen. The album saw the departure of bassist Les Pattinson from the group, partly due to disagreements with vocalist Ian McCulloch; McCulloch and the remaining band member, guitarist Will Sergeant, subsequently recorded the record with session musicians. The London Metropolitan Orchestra provided backing music and the American rap rock band Fun Lovin' Criminals appeared as guest musicians on two tracks. The album was produced by Alan Douglas and Echo & the Bunnymen and it was recorded at various locations throughout England. Feeling sidelined during the recording of the album, Sergeant described it as "probably the worst time in my whole life".

What Are You Going to Do with Your Life? was released on 16 April 1999 through London Records following the release of the first single from the album, "Rust", the previous month. One further single, "Get in the Car", followed the album's release. The album received mixed reviews from the music press, being described as both flawless and having no appeal. The album was not as popular with the public as earlier releases from Echo & the Bunnymen; the album peaked at number twenty-one on the UK Albums Chart.

== Background and recording ==
After the release of Echo & the Bunnymen's previous album, Evergreen (1997), and its three singles, the only new material by the band in 1998 was the song "Fools Like Us". It was released only on the soundtrack for the romantic comedy film Martha, Meet Frank, Daniel and Laurence. Vocalist Ian McCulloch wrote the official song for England's 1998 football World Cup campaign, which he recorded with the Spice Girls and Ocean Colour Scene as England United. Although McCulloch was proud of the song, it was not popular with the fans, peaking number nine on the UK Singles Chart. It was beaten to the number one position by the unofficial song, "Three Lions '98", released by David Baddiel, Frank Skinner and The Lightning Seeds.

When Echo & the Bunnymen entered the studio to record What Are You Going to Do with Your Life?, bassist Les Pattinson received news that his mother was unwell. That, coupled with Pattinson's perception that McCulloch wanted everything his way, led to Pattinson announcing his retirement from the band. McCulloch and guitarist Will Sergeant were determined to continue as Echo & the Bunnymen and recruited session musicians so they could record the album. The album was produced by Alan Douglas and Echo & the Bunnymen and was recorded at Doghouse Studios in Henley-on-Thames, Parr Street Studios in Liverpool, and Olympic Studios, Maida Vale Studios and CTS in London.

As with previous Echo & the Bunnymen albums, What Are You Going to Do with Your Life? used the London Metropolitan Orchestra to provide backing music. American alternative hip hop band Fun Lovin' Criminals appeared on the album as guest musicians on two tracks. Sergeant's guitar-work on the album was understated and he later said, "It was probably the worst time in my whole life, doing that LP—I hated it [...] I'm on all the tracks here and there, but generally I just stayed in the tent! It was a horrible experience." The album is a collection of ballads and has been described as a follow-up to McCulloch's 1989 solo album, Candleland. In a 2005 interview for Record Collector magazine, McCulloch said, "Will [Sergeant] hated the album, and I can understand why. He'd ask me where his guitar was supposed to go on certain songs and I'd say, 'Well, nowhere, it doesn't really have a place'."

== Release and reception ==
Professional ratings
Review scores
Source	Rating
Allmusic	4/5 stars
CMJ	(favourable)
The Independent	(unfavourable)
Pitchfork	6.4/10

Released in March 1999, "Rust" was the first single to come from What Are You Going to Do with Your Life?. The single peaked at number twenty-two on the UK Singles Chart, and NME magazine named it their Single of the Week. The album was released the following month on 16 April and, having failed to appeal to the public as much as the band's previous albums, peaked at number twenty-one on the UK Albums Chart. "Get in the Car", one of the tracks recorded with Fun Lovin' Criminals, was later released as a single.

M. Tye Comer for CMJ said, "[Echo & the Bunnymen] revisit the melancholia they've tussled with for nearly 20 years with a mature soul and a romantic urgency, having grown up without growing old." Awarding the album four out of five stars, Stephen Thomas Erlewine writing for Allmusic said the album "feels of a piece with their earlier albums, not only sonically, but in terms of quality." Mark Richard-San for Pitchfork Media said, "The over-the-top, bass-driven rockers of yore have been replaced with an album of introspective, acoustic songs appropriate for these aging geezers." Richard-San also described McCulloch as having a "rich, resonant voice", adding "the quality of his singing is perfect – a weary voice transmitting from some abandoned studio of yesteryear."

"I haven't played it at all since it was finished, it just doesn't do anything for me. It was like [McCulloch] and the manager doing something that didn't really involve anyone else. It's hard to fight in a situation where you've got the singer and the manager both thinking you're surplus to requirements."

—Will Sergeant

Andy Gill for The Independent newspaper took a less favourable view when he said, "[The album] has, as its title suggests, all the appeal of a discussion with a career adviser." When he described the style of the album, Gill said, "It doesn't really help matters that as they get more mature, the band appear to be indulging their interest in Burt Bacharach and Jimmy Webb rather more openly, despite lacking either songwriter's way with a winning melody." In his 2003 book The Rough Guide to Rock, Peter Buckley described the album as "a little gushing and overall disappointing".

Echo & the Bunnymen left London Records in early 2000. McCulloch said, "What they said is, 'We'll keep you on if you don't take as much money as in the contract,' and we had no intention of staying anyway, so it was kind of 'were we pushed or did we fall?'" There was also a change in the band's management with Toogood departing to start his own record label. With the session musicians who recorded What Are You Going to Do with Your Life? moving on, McCulloch and Sergeant recruited a new band, with whom they would go on to record the 2000 EP, Avalanche, which was available to buy over only the internet.

== Track listing ==
All tracks written by Ian McCulloch and Will Sergeant.

1. "What Are You Going to Do with Your Life?" – 5:11
2. "Rust" – 5:09
3. "Get in the Car" – 4:21
4. "Baby Rain" – 4:17
5. "History Chimes" – 3:25
6. "Lost on You" – 4:50
7. "Morning Sun" – 4:12
8. "When It All Blows Over" – 2:57
9. "Fools Like Us" – 4:02

== Personnel ==
Echo & the Bunnymen

- Ian McCulloch – vocals, guitar, piano
- Will Sergeant – lead guitar

with:

- Guy Pratt – bass
- Jeremy Stacey – drums
- Harry Morgan – percussion
- Mark Taylor – keyboards
- Paul Williams – backing vocals
- Les Pattinson – bass ("Fools Like Us")
- Michael Lee – drums ("Baby Rain" and "Morning Sun")
- London Metropolitan Orchestra – strings, woodwind, brass
- Fun Lovin' Criminals – guest musicians ("Get in the Car" and "When It All Blows Over")

Technical

- Echo & the Bunnymen – producer
- Alan Douglas – producer, mixer
- Mark Stent – mixer ("Rust" and "Baby Rain")
- Nick Ingman – string arrangement
- Ed Shearmur – string arrangement ("Fools Like Us")
- Andrew Douglas — photography (cover)
- Kevin Westenberg – photography (liner notes)

== Charts ==
Chart (1999)	Peak position
Scottish Albums (OCC)	27
UK Albums (OCC)	21

Chart (2024)	Peak position
Scottish Albums (OCC)	20
UK Independent Albums (OCC)	5
