= The Fountain (album) =

2009 studio album by Echo & the Bunnymen

Studio album by Echo & the Bunnymen
- Released: 12 October 2009
- Recorded: Parr Street Studios, Liverpool; The Mixing Rooms, Glasgow; Archangel Studios, New York
- Genre: Alternative rock
- Length: 36:52
- Label: Ocean Rain
- Producers: Ian McCulloch, John McLaughlin, Simon Perry

Echo & the Bunnymen chronology
Siberia (2005)	The Fountain (2009)	Meteorites (2014)

Singles from The Fountain
- 1. "Think I Need It Too" Released: October 2009; 2. "Life of a Thousand Crimes" Released: January 2010

The Fountain is the eleventh studio album by British band Echo & the Bunnymen. It was released in the UK on 12 October 2009 and produced by John McLaughlin, Ian McCulloch and Simon Perry. It was released in the US on 10 November 2009. The first single from the album, "Think I Need It Too", was released on 28 September 2009.

== Reception ==
Professional ratings
Aggregate scores
Source	Rating
Metacritic	58/100
Review scores
Source	Rating
Allmusic	3/5 stars
The Guardian	4/5 stars
The Independent	(favourable)
Mojo	2/5 stars
NME	6/10 stars
The Observer	(mixed)
Q	3/5 stars
The Times	3/5 stars
Uncut	2/5 stars
The Word	(unfavourable)

The album was released to mostly mixed reviews. Reviewing The Fountain for the British music magazine Mojo, Johnny Sharp described the album as "mid-tempo, middle of the road, middle-aged pop-rock". Sharp went on to say that the only character was to be found in the "pun-laden lyrics" of "Shroud of Turin". Writing in The Word, Andrew Collins said that despite there being a "languid grace" to whatever the pair do, [lead singer, Ian] McCulloch's voice "sounds shot" and [guitarist, Will] Sergeant's guitar sounded like a "diluted copy of somebody copying him". Stephen Troussé for Uncut described the album as "dismayingly anonymous". Troussé went on to describe McLaughlin's production as "hyper-compressed, anodyne-sheen".

In The Guardian, Dave Simpson gave the album four stars. He described the album as, "Their most accessible offering in a long time sees Ian McCulloch at his most lyrically playful and cocksure, hovering between confessional [...] and mischievous, and firing off one-liners as if it were the band's 80s heyday. Will Sergeant's guitar-playing is at its scintillating best [...] Their poppiest tunes since 'Bring on the Dancing Horses' could win the Scouse veterans a new generation of fans." Writing in the music magazine Q, Garry Mulholland described McCulloch and Sergeant's sound as "remarkably perky" and "rejuvenated by an injection of youth from new rhythm section Simon Perry and David Thomas and pop producer John McLaughlin."

The Fountain reached No. 63 on the UK Albums Chart.

== Track listing ==
All tracks written by Ian McCulloch, John McLaughlin, Simon Perry, David Thomas, and Will Sergeant, except where noted.

1. "Think I Need It Too" – 3:41
2. "Forgotten Fields" – 3:46
3. "Do You Know Who I Am?" – 2:52
4. "Shroud of Turin" (McCulloch, Sergeant) – 4:10
5. "Life of a Thousand Crimes" (McCulloch, Sergeant) – 3:22
6. "The Fountain" (McCulloch) – 4:01
7. "Everlasting Neverendless" – 3:08
8. "Proxy" (McCulloch) – 3:15
9. "Drivetime" – 4:11
10. "The Idolness of Gods" (McCulloch) – 4:26

== Personnel ==
- Ian McCulloch – vocals, guitar, piano, keyboards, percussion, producer, mixing ("The Fountain")
- Will Sergeant – guitar, vocals, bass, piano, keyboards, drums, percussion
- John McLaughlin – producer
- Simon Perry – producer ("Think I Need It Too", "Forgotten Fields", "Do You Know Who I Am?", "Life of a Thousand Crimes", "Everlasting Neverendless", and "Drivetime")
- David Thomas – mixing (except "The Fountain")
- Andrea Wright – additional production, mixing ("The Fountain")
- Paul Fleming – keyboards, synthesizers, piano, drum programming
- Gordy Goudie – guitar, vocals, bass, e-bow on "The Fountain", lap steel on "The Idolness of Gods"
- Nick Kilroe – drums, percussion, loops on "Everlasting Neverendless"

== Charts ==
Chart (2009)	Peak position
French Albums (SNEP)	176
Scottish Albums (Official Charts)	49
UK Albums (Official Charts)	63
UK Independent Albums (Official Charts)	9
