= Spare ribs =

Pork ribs variety

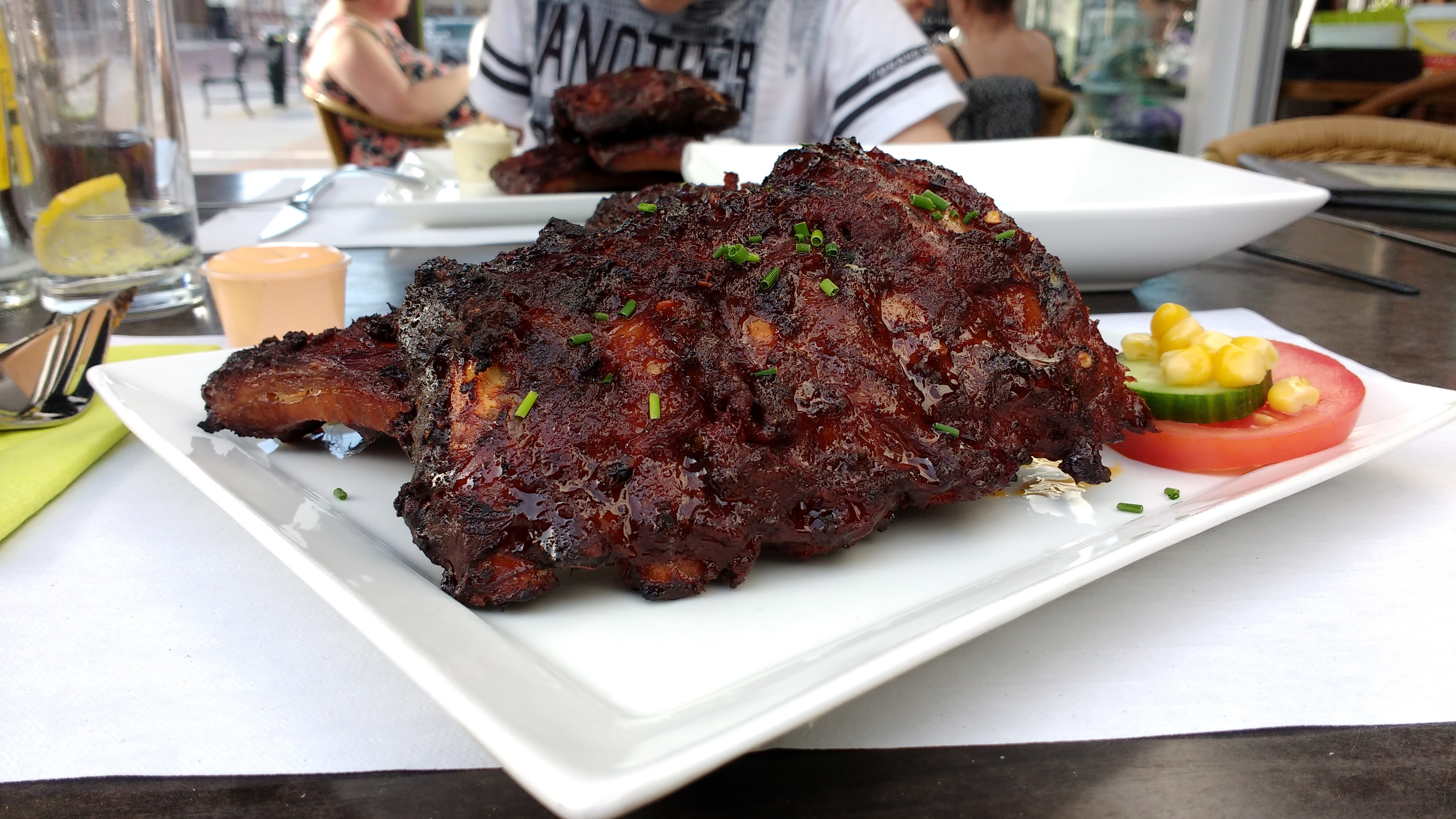
A typical example of Southern United States style spare ribs

Spare ribs (also side ribs or spareribs) are a variety of ribs cut from the lower portion of a pig, specifically the belly and breastbone, behind the shoulder, and include 11 to 13 long bones. Meat and fat cover the bones. Spare ribs (pork) are distinguished from short ribs. Spare ribs are typically cooked low and slow, either smoked, grilled, or braised.

Pork spare ribs are cooked and eaten in various cuisines around the world. They are especially popular in Chinese and American Chinese cuisine, in which they are generally called paigu (Chinese: 排骨; pinyin: páigǔ; Cantonese Yale: pàaih gwāt; lit. 'row of bones'), and in the cuisine of the Southern United States.

== Preparation ==
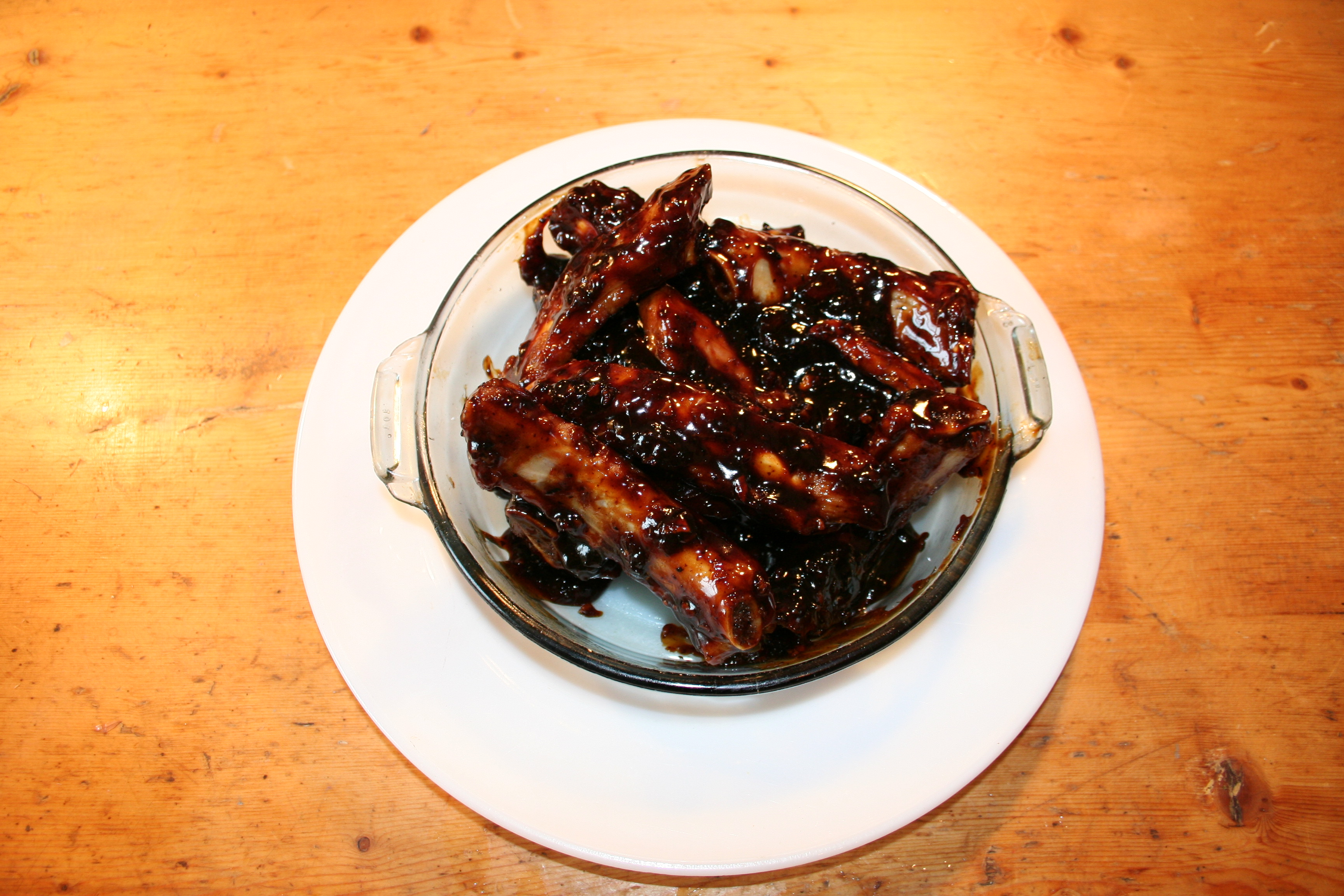
Chinese spare ribs

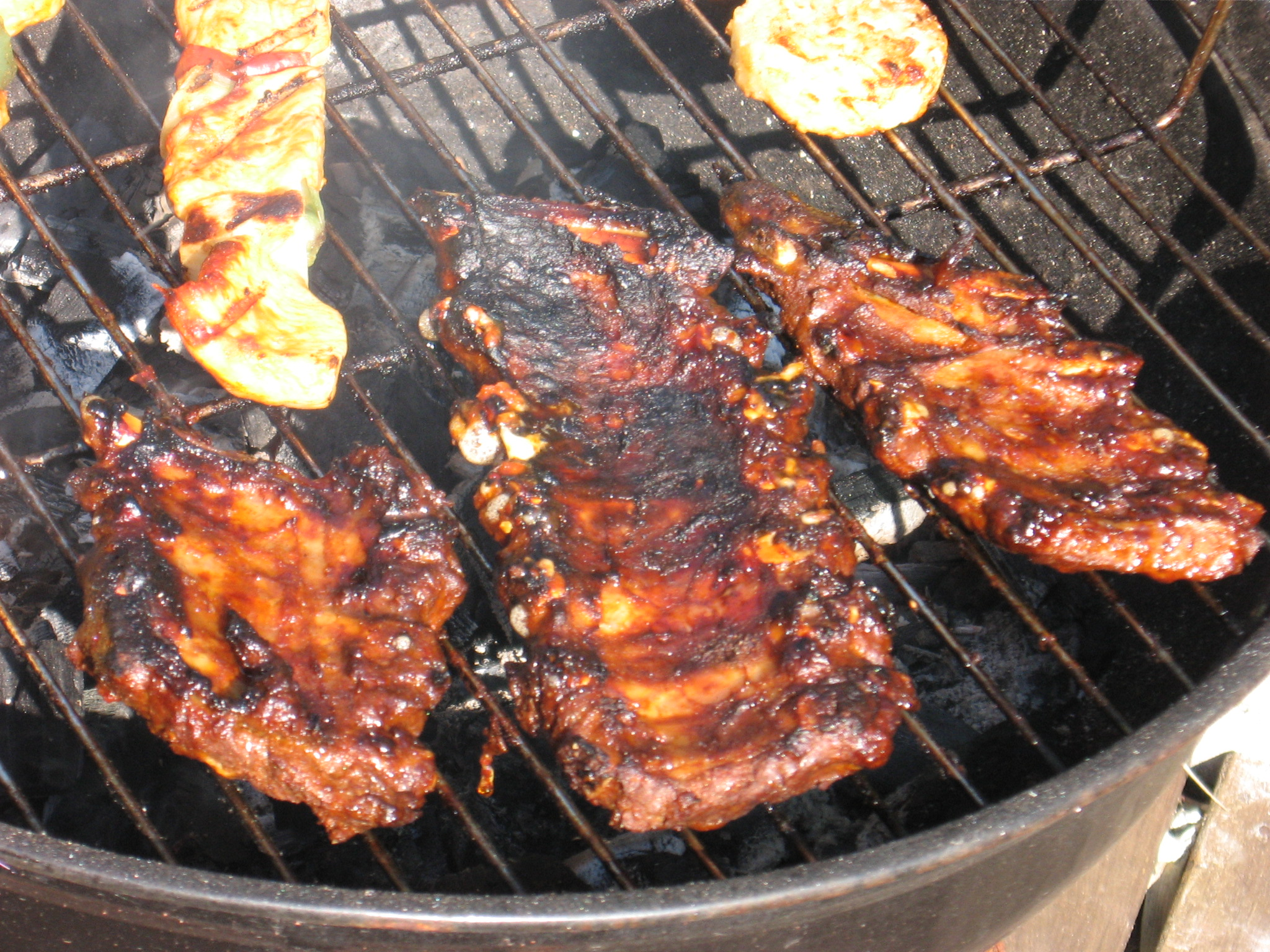
Basted spare ribs on an outdoor grill

=== Asia ===
In Chinese cuisine, pork spare ribs are generally first cut into 7-to-10-centimetre (3 to 4 in) sections, which then may be fried, steamed, or braised.

In the Cantonese cuisine of southern China, spare ribs are generally red in color and roasted with a sweet and savory sauce. This variety of spare ribs is grouped as one of the most common items of siu mei, or Cantonese roasted meat dishes. In American Chinese cuisine, pork spare ribs are generally cooked in char siu style, and often feature as a part of the appetizer dish called pu pu platter.

In Canada, a variant of the dish called Thunder Bay bon bons is made by deep frying pork spare ribs.

Chinese-style spare ribs are usually consumed by gnawing the meat off small bone sections held aloft with chopsticks.

Spare ribs are a popular dish in Korean cuisine. They are often grilled or barbecued. They can also be made into a stew or soup.

=== Southern American ===
Spare ribs are popular in the American South. They are generally cooked on a smoker like a pellet smoker or an offset smoker, and are served as a slab (bones and all) with a sauce. The combination of an infamously fickle meat, very narrow target temperature window, delicate spice balancing, and long cooking times have earned spare ribs the reputation of a notoriously difficult dish to prepare properly. Due to the extended cooking times required for barbecuing, ribs in restaurants are often prepared first by boiling, parboiling, or steaming the rib rack and then finishing it on the grill.

American butchers prepare two cuts:

- Pork spare ribs are taken from the belly side of the pig's rib cage above the sternum (breast bone) and below the back ribs which extend about 6" down from the spine. Spare ribs are flatter than the curved back ribs and contain more bone than meat. There is also quite a bit of fat which can make the ribs more tender than baby back ribs.
- St. Louis Cut ribs are spare ribs in the style of St. Louis-style barbecue, where the sternum bone, cartilage and the surrounding meat known as the rib tips have been removed. St. Louis Cut rib racks are almost rectangular.

Southern-style spare ribs are usually pulled from the whole slab and consumed individually by hand, with the small amount of meat adhering to each bone gnawed off by the eater.

=== Mexican ===
Spare ribs are a popular dish in Mexican cuisine. They are often cooked in adobo sauce, a chili-based sauce. They can also be made into tacos or burritos.

== See also ==
- Prime rib
- Soki
