= The Turning Point (The Vampire Diaries) =

- The Vampire Diaries episode
- Episode no.: Season 1 Episode 10
- Directed by: J. Miller Tobin
- Story by: Barbie Kligman
- Teleplay by: Kevin Williamson; Julie Plec
- Cinematography by: Paul M. Sommers
- Editing by: Joshua Butler
- Production code: 2J5009
- Original air date: November 19, 2009

Guest appearances
- Matt Davis as Alaric Saltzman; Chris Johnson as Logan Fell; Marguerite MacIntyre as Liz Forbes

Episode chronology
← Previous "History Repeating"	Next → "Bloodlines"
- The Vampire Diaries season 1

"The Turning Point" is the tenth episode of the first season of the American supernatural teen drama television series The Vampire Diaries. It aired on The CW on November 19, 2009. The episode's teleplay was written by series developers Kevin Williamson and Julie Plec based on a story by co-executive producer Barbie Kligman, while J. Miller Tobin served as director.

== Plot ==
The episode starts where the previous one ended, with Logan (Chris Johnson) asking Jenna (Sara Canning) to invite him in the house. Jenna slams the door in his face and an upset Logan attacks, bites and kills a woman who passes by at the moment.

Jeremy (Steven R. McQueen) goes through his dad's stuff and an old journal he found. The journal is filled with notes and drawings of strange creatures, something that makes him start drawing again.

Damon (Ian Somerhalder) and Stefan (Paul Wesley) discuss where they should go now that they are leaving Mystic Falls when the doorbell rings. Stefan opens the door and sees Sheriff Forbes (Marguerite MacIntyre), who asks for Damon. She tells Damon that there was a new vampire attack in the town, something that surprises him. Stefan overhears their conversation and asks Damon if it was him. Damon reassures him that there is a new vampire in town and they decide not to leave till they find him.

Caroline (Candice Accola) and Matt (Zach Roerig) get closer. Everyone notices including Tyler (Michael Trevino), who grills Matt about it. Bonnie (Kat Graham) is still a little freaked out about being attacked by Damon but she is grateful to Stefan who saved her life. Stefan shows up at school to inform Elena (Nina Dobrev) about the new vampire and to be careful till they find out who it is.

Damon tries to track down the new vampire using the watch he took from Logan but because he cannot do it himself (its signal interferes with his vampire nature) he asks for Caroline's help and then he compels her to forget everything. The watch leads him to a warehouse where he is ambushed and shot by Logan. Damon is surprised seeing him and wants to know who turned him. Logan believes Damon was the one who did it and he asks him how he can walk in the sun.

Back at the school, there is a career fair where Jeremy sees a sketch that Tyler drew. He tries to talk to him but Tyler gets aggressive and they end up fighting. Tyler's dad, the Mayor, separates them and takes them outside where he asks them to fight and solve their differences as men. Alaric (Matt Davis), who followed them outside, asks what is going on and he faces off the Mayor stopping him from making the two boys fight.

Elena catches up with Matt asking him about Caroline and telling him about Stefan. Matt says that he and Caroline are only friends while Caroline watches the two of them talking from a distance. Stefan interrupts them and he tries to update Elena about the new vampire when Jenna comes and tells them that Logan is at the school. Stefan, who knows that Logan was supposed to be dead, realizes that he is the new vampire and leaves to find him. Elena asks what is going on and Stefan asks her to take Jenna and go. Elena understands his tone and leaves, telling Jenna not to talk again to Logan. Meanwhile, Logan asks Stefan how he can walk in the sunlight and he threatens to expose him if he will not tell him. Stefan stands up to him and he leaves.

In the meantime, Caroline announces to her mom that she wants to be a broadcast journalist but her mom is not impressed stating that Caroline does not even read the paper. Caroline leaves and Logan confronts the Sheriff for whom he believes is the one who buried him and covered his "death". He threatens her and then leaves while Sheriff calls for backup. Logan sees Caroline outside being stood up by Bonnie and offers to drive her home. Matt sees Caroline getting into Logan's car but he does not see Logan knock her unconscious before driving away.

Stefan is at the phone with Damon talking about Logan. Damon is angry about the ambush and wants to kill Logan. He is heading right at the school as soon as Stefan tells him that Logan is there. Elena comes to Stefan asking about Logan when Matt comes and tells them that Caroline left with him. Elena is terrified and Stefan leaves to find Caroline.

Logan calls the Sheriff to tell her that he has her daughter and he will turn her into a vampire when Stefan and Damon appear and pull him out of the car. Damon shoots him with wooden bullets and sends Stefan off to take Caroline home. Damon informs the Sheriff where they are via the radio and then he starts interrogating Logan trying to find out who turned him. Logan still says he does not know but the moment Damon is about to kill him, Logan says to Damon that he and the vampire who turned him have another way to raise the vampires who are trapped under the Fell's Church, including Katherine. Damon is shocked but he wants to believe him and, while the Sheriff approaches, he asks Logan to knock him down and make it look real. Logan throws Damon away and escapes.

After taking Caroline home, Stefan gets back to school to find Elena. He tells her that they cannot be together and she offers to drive him home. Elena tries to convince him that he is not responsible for what is happening in her life since her life was painful way before his arrival. Stefan is not convinced though and he walks away. Elena shouts at him that she loves him. Stefan, hearing that, gets back to her and kisses her. The two of them get into the house and sleep together for the first time.

Logan heads to his car to go and find Damon but he runs into Alaric. Alaric warns him to stay away from Jenna because she deserves the best. Logan makes fun of how stupid he is and then tries to attack him but Alaric stakes him in the heart and kills him. The Sheriff finds Logan's body and calls Damon to thank him, thinking that he killed him. Damon, who was waiting for Logan at the Fell's Church, is shocked hearing the news and has no idea who might have killed Logan.

Back at Stefan's bedroom, Stefan leaves the room to bring Elena something to drink, leaving her alone. Elena starts walking around the room checking on Stefan's things when she sees Katherine's picture. She is in shock seeing how much she looks like her and she immediately leaves. Stefan comes back looking for her but he cannot find her. He sees the necklace he gave her on Katherine's picture and understands that Elena saw it.

The episode ends with Elena driving back home in tears when suddenly a figure appears in front of her. She tries to avoid him but she hits him and her car flips over trapping her in the driver's seat. She turns her head and watches that the figure reanimates itself, gets up and starts walking towards her.

== Feature music ==
In "The Turning Point" we can hear the songs:

- "This is Beautiful" by Tyrone Wells
- "Cut" by Plumb
- "Off Track" by The Features
- "Coast of Carolina" by Telekinesis
- "Chances" by Five for Fighting

== Reception ==
=== Ratings ===
In its original American broadcast, "The Turning Point" was watched by 3.57 million; down by 0.53 from the previous episode.

=== Reviews ===
"The Turning Point" received positive reviews by critics.

Robin Franson Pruter from Forced Viewing rated the episode with 3/4 saying that ultimately, the episode was strong just not outstanding. "A solid episode moves the plot as characters examine their futures and learn about new threats in town. This episode covers a lot of ground, with a number of little developments in multiple storylines. And, while all the material in this episode is solid, nothing in the episode reaches the level of excellence that the scenes between the Salvatore brothers reached in "History Repeating.""

Lauren Attaway of Star Pulse gave a B− rate to the episode saying: "Last night's episode of The Vampire Diaries could not have had a more fitting title, because it was all about turns in the storylines and the characters' lives."

Josie Kafka from Doux Reviews rated the episode with 3.5/4 saying that it was the one who made her a convert when she first watched the show. "Looking back, I think the past five episodes have been pretty darn awesome. I also realize the comedy inherent in being turned by an episode called "The Turning Point.""

Matt Richenthal from TV Fanatic gave a good review to the episode saying that "...this was yet another outstanding installment of the best new show on television...". He continued by commenting on the relationship between the two Salvatore brothers: "They may never truly be on the same side, but a good show finds interesting ways to develop characters and keep their interactions fresh. The Vampire Diaries is a good show."

Popsugar of Buzzsugar gave a good review to the episode highlighting that she can't wait for the show to come back after its hiatus. "I was already bummed knowing this was the last week of new episodes of The Vampire Diaries until January; and now, having seen it, I'm freaking out a little bit. I knew there was going to be an epic cliffhanger, I just didn't know how epic! [...] I don't know how I'm going to deal with the show's hiatus for two long months, let alone waiting that long to find out what was coming for Elena. Or, who Alaric is; did he kill Logan to protect Jenna, eliminate a problem-causing newborn, or something more insidious?"

Lucia from Heroine TV also wrote a good review saying: "...the plot twists keep on coming in this increasingly mythology-driven show. Last night’s episode was no exception, as we were treated to one surprise after another, culminating in a seemingly dire cliffhanger."

Tiffany Vogt from The TV Watchtower stated that the episode has a little bit of everything for everyone. "This was indeed the turning point for everyone. It was no longer a show about the discovery of vampires. This is now a story about how virtually everyone knows there are vampires and how they interact with them."

== Notes ==
- In next episodes we learn that once all the people who live in a house die, vampires can entry without an invitation. In this episode though, Logan says that he can't get into his house since he was living alone and there is no one to invite him in. Logan shouldn't have an issue getting into his house.
- This was the mid-season finale episode before the show goes on a two-month hiatus.
