= History Repeating (The Vampire Diaries) =

- The Vampire Diaries episode
- Episode no.: Season 1 Episode 9
- Directed by: Marcos Siega
- Written by: Bryan M. Holdman; Brian Young
- Cinematography by: Paul M. Sommers
- Editing by: Lance Anderson
- Production code: 2J5008
- Original air date: November 12, 2009

Guest appearances
- Matt Davis as Alaric Saltzman; Bianca Lawson as Emily Bennett; Chris Johnson as Logan Fell

Episode chronology
← Previous "162 Candles"	Next → "The Turning Point"
- The Vampire Diaries season 1

"History Repeating" is the ninth episode of the first season of the American supernatural teen drama television series The Vampire Diaries. It aired on The CW on November 12, 2009. The episode was written by executive story editor Bryan M. Holdman and staff writer Brian Young, and directed by supervising producer Marcos Siega.

== Plot ==
The episode starts with Bonnie (Kat Graham) in class when she sees Emily (Bianca Lawson) and she leaves the class to follow her. Emily leads her to an old burned down building. Bonnie wakes up in the class screaming and everyone is staring at her. She turns around and sees Emily sitting right next to her and Bonnie wakes up again, this time for real, in the woods.

A new history teacher, Alaric Saltzman (Matt Davis) walks into the class and introduces himself. After class, Bonnie describes Elena her dream thinking that she is haunted by Emily and that it might have something to do with the crystal she is wearing.

Damon (Ian Somerhalder) tries to make nice for killing Lexi (Arielle Kebbel) and he explains to Stefan (Paul Wesley) that he did it for them. He also promises not to feed on humans for a week but Stefan is not really amused by his humor over the subject. Stefan later finds Elena at school and informs her that he will not be coming to school anymore or near her to protect her.

Alaric calls Jeremy (Steven R. McQueen) to give him a second chance after seeing his grades from Mr. Tanner's notes and he asks him to write a paper about local history. Jeremy thanks him and he notices the ring that Alaric wears, a ring that looks a lot like the ones Damon and Stefan have. He explains that it belonged to his father.

Meanwhile, Damon confronts Bonnie and demands his necklace back but Bonnie is not giving it. Damon tells her that he knows about Emily haunting her and, before he leaves, he gives Bonnie a message for Emily: "A deal's a deal". Bonnie tells Elena about Damon as they drive home when suddenly she pulls the car over and throws the crystal into an open field. Elena calls Stefan to inform him about Damon and the crystal. Stefan explains that Emily was Katherine's handmaid and that the crystal was once belonged to Katherine. However, he does not know why Damon wants it so badly and he promises to find out.

Jenna (Sara Canning) and Jeremy are at the Grill talking about his paper when she sees Alaric. Jeremy offers to introduce her but she declines and tells Jeremy that he can use his father's stuff for his paper. Alaric approaches and introduces himself and Jenna thanks him for giving Jeremy a second chance. Later Jeremy leaves and Jenna, being alone, goes and sits with Alaric at the bar. Alaric tells her that his wife died, implying that she was murdered. He later escorts Jenna back home but she does not invite him in because Jeremy is home.

Elena tries for Bonnie and Caroline (Candice Accola) to make up. She invites Caroline for dinner, while Bonnie is already there. Caroline apologizes but she gets upset when Bonnie tells her that she threw the necklace away. But Caroline finds the necklace in Bonnie's purse and she accuses her of lying. Bonnie is surprised to see the crystal and wonders if Emily will ever leave her alone. Caroline does not understand anything and Bonnie tells her that she is a witch but Caroline does not believe her.

Caroline apologizes once again to Bonnie and she gives her the necklace back. She then proposes the three of them to have a séance. During the séance, the candles flare, a cold wind blows in while Bonnie is calling for Emily. The window opens with a blast and the three girls freak out. Bonnie throws the crystal on the floor but when the lights come back on, the crystal is not there.

Elena, Caroline and Bonnie search for the crystal when Elena sees a figure crossing the hallway and Bonnie sees the necklace in the bathroom. She goes in to get it but the door closes locking her inside. She starts screaming for help and Elena and Caroline try to open the door but they can't. Suddenly, the door opens and Bonnie seems fine but she is acting weird. The reflection in the mirror shows that Emily got into her body. Bonnie says she is fine and walks downstairs. Elena calls her but she is not answering and she realizes that Emily has possessed Bonnie's body. She tries to stop her from leaving the house but she cannot.

In the meantime, Stefan is being friendly to Damon so he can be able to make him tell him why he wants the crystal. They play darts at the bar and later go to the football field to play football. While they are talking, Damon finally asks Stefan what does he want. Stefan starts talking about Katherine and tells him that what they felt about her was not real since she compelled them to think so. Damon doesn't want to talk about it and walks away. Stefan finally asks why he wants Katherine's crystal and Damon reveals his secret; he wants to bring Katherine back.

Stefan is in shock and demands to know how he will do it. Damon explains that Katherine is not dead but buried in the tomb under the church. He asked Emily to save her by using magic and Emily agreed but asked him in return to protect her family. Damon kept his promise and now he wants Emily to keep her part of the deal. Emily used the crystal to reclaim power from a passing comet and the crystal regained its power when another comet passed over Mystic Falls (referring to episode 2) and now it's ready to be used again.

Elena calls Stefan and tells him that Emily possessed Bonnie's body and she is going to Fell's church. Damon overhears it and heads there immediately. He encounters Emily who tells him that she can't keep her promise because things are different now. Damon tries to attack her but she throws him away and impales him on a tree using her witch power.

Stefan finds Damon and helps him. Emily is working on a spell and tells Stefan that she cannot bring Katherine back because the other 26 vampires who "died" that same day will come back as well, something that Damon forgot to tell him earlier. Stefan tries to tell Damon that he can't do that but he is not listening; he wants Katherine back and also revenge on the people of Mystic Falls for hunting them down.

Emily finishes the spell by throwing the crystal up in the air and it explodes. Emily leaves Bonnie's body and Damon, who is mad at Emily, attacks Bonnie. Stefan pulls him back and saves Bonnie by giving her his blood. Damon is devastated because his only shot to bring Katherine back is gone and he tells Stefan that Katherine never compelled him, that he knew everything from the beginning and he really loved her.

Bonnie does not understand what happened and Elena promises to explain everything and she informs Stefan that she will tell Bonnie the truth. She also tells him that she now she knows she can be with him but Stefan breaks up with her and tells her that he will leave Mystic Falls.

The episode ends with Logan (Chris Johnson) knocking on Jenna's door. Jenna opens the door and Logan asks her if she will invite him in.

== Feature music ==
In "History Repeating" we can hear the songs:

- "Come Back When You Can" by Barcelona
- "The Spectator" by The Bravery
- "Post-electric" by Idlewild
- "Lies" by Pablo Sebastian
- "Think I Need It Too" by Echo & the Bunnymen
- "Houses" by Great Northern

== Reception ==
=== Ratings ===
In its original American broadcast, "History Repeating" was watched by 4.10 million; slightly up from the previous episode by only 0.01.

=== Reviews ===
"History Repeating" received generally positive reviews with some of the critics commenting on the new character of the show, Alaric Saltzman, and if he is a new vampire in town or not.

Robin Franson Pruter of Forced Viewing rated the episode with 3/4 stating: "Masterful scenes between the Salvatore brothers and a huge revelation lift up an uneven, plot-packed episode."

Josie Kafka of Doux Reviews rated the episode with 3/4 and commented on Davis' character: "Alaric is complex, too: he has a gaudy ring—is he a vampire? Is he something else? What isn’t he telling us? He had a hard time crossing the boundary of Jenna’s front door."

Popsugar of Buzzsugar gave a good review to the episode saying: "Dear The Vampire Diaries, I see your master plan now: it's to bring it every week now. Please continue to do so." About Alaric she states: "The dreamy Alaric has a shady past (dead wife who was almost certainly murdered) and every sign points to him being a vampire: the sun-protecting ring, the lingering exchange of Jenna not inviting him in. It's almost too obvious. If he is a vamp and not some other supernatural being, then what role does he play?"

Matt Richenthal of TV Fanatic gave a good review to the episode saying: "Solid storytelling! There's nothing sweeter to a television critic that sensible storylines, plots that actually take awhile to develop and come together perfectly when they do." Richenthal also comments on the arrival of the new character, Alaric, wondering: "is he a good vampire or a bad vampire?"

Lucia from Heroine TV said that this was another amazing episode: "...this show just keeps getting better and better. Yes, I know that I say that every week, shut up. I was enthralled by every scene featuring Damon and Stefan together, and there were so many of them."
