= Porcupine (album) =

1983 album by Echo & the Bunnymen

Studio album by Echo & the Bunnymen
- Released: 4 February 1983
- Recorded: 1982
- Studios: Trident (London); Rockfield (Rockfield, Wales); Amazon (Liverpool)
- Genres: Post-punk; pop
- Length: 44:56
- Label: Korova
- Producer: Ian Broudie

Echo & the Bunnymen chronology
Heaven Up Here (1981)	Porcupine (1983)	Ocean Rain (1984)

Singles from Porcupine
- 1. "The Back of Love" Released: 21 May 1982; 2. "The Cutter" Released: 14 January 1983

Porcupine is the third studio album by the English post-punk band Echo & the Bunnymen. It was released on 4 February 1983 through the label Korova. It became the band's highest-charting release when it reached number two on the UK Albums Chart despite initially receiving poor reviews. It also reached number 137 on the American Billboard 200, number 85 on the Canadian RPM 100 Albums and number 24 on the Swedish chart. In 1984, the album was certified gold by the British Phonographic Industry. The album includes the singles "The Back of Love" and "The Cutter".

Porcupine was recorded at Trident Studios in London, Rockfield Studios in South Wales and Amazon Studios in Liverpool. It was produced by Ian Broudie (credited as "Kingbird"), who had produced their second single, "Rescue". After being rejected by the band's label, the album was re-recorded with Shankar providing strings. It was originally released as an LP in 1983 before being reissued on CD in 1988. The album was reissued as a remastered and expanded CD in 2003, along with the other four of the band's first five studio albums. A VHS video called Porcupine – An Atlas Adventure was also released, containing six promotional videos of tracks from the album.

== Production ==
=== Background and recording ===
Following the release of Heaven Up Here in 1981, Echo & the Bunnymen had difficulty writing new material. Lead guitarist Will Sergeant has stated that extensive touring during this period had limited the band's ability to work on new songs, and, while lead singer Ian McCulloch still wanted them to be the best band in the world, other projects were opening up for them as individuals. Drummer Pete de Freitas produced and played drums on Liverpool band the Wild Swans' debut single "Revolutionary Spirit", and Will Sergeant recorded a solo album of instrumental music titled Themes for 'Grind' (1982), which had been intended as a soundtrack to a film. To add to the tensions, bass player Les Pattinson was expressing his weariness with the music industry.

On 27 January 1982, Echo & the Bunnymen recorded their fourth session for British disc jockey John Peel's radio show on BBC Radio 1. Two of the tracks recorded for Peel went on to appear on Porcupine, re-recorded and retitled: "An Equation" (retitled "Higher Hell") and "Taking Advantage" (retitled "The Back of Love"). Ian Broudie, Sergeant's flatmate and the co-producer of 1980's Crocodiles, was chosen to produce "The Back of Love" single and the Porcupine album, which had a working title of The Happy Loss. The single, which became the band's first UK Top 20 hit single, was recorded in early 1982 at Trident Studios in Soho, London, though the band's manager Bill Drummond had previously tried to keep the band away from the temptations of the city. During the recording session for "The Back of Love" the relationship among the band members was strained, so Drummond arranged an April 1982 tour in Scotland in an effort to make the band work harder, write songs and communicate with each other. His plan failed; following the tour, tension persisted among the band members. Two other album tracks, "Clay" and "My White Devil", were first played during the Scottish tour.

Following the release of "The Back of Love" on 21 May 1982, the band played at the inaugural WOMAD festival and then at various European music festivals throughout the summer. The band then resumed recording the album at Rockfield Studios in South Wales, which had been used for the band's first two albums, and also at Amazon Studios in Liverpool. According to de Freitas, recording the album was a slow process: "Porcupine was very hard to actually write and record [...] Heaven Up Here was pure confidence, we did it really quickly; we had a great time doing it – but this one was like we had to drag it out of ourselves." McCulloch later said that when recording the album, the mood among the band members was "horrible".

When presented with the finished album, WEA rejected it as "too uncommercial". The band agreed to rerecord the album despite Sergeant's complaints. Using the original version of the album as a blueprint, the follow-up recording sessions went more smoothly. Drummond brought Shankar back to add strings to the other tracks on the album. These sessions produced the band's next single "The Cutter", which was released in January 1983 and went on to become the band's first Top 10 hit.

=== Porcupine – An Atlas Adventure ===
A screenshot from "The Cutter" music video showing Echo & the Bunnymen in the icy landscape of Iceland.

After Echo & the Bunnymen had finished recording Porcupine, they played a free show in early November 1982 for 20,000 people at Sefton Park in Liverpool. WEA then asked for three music videos and artwork for the new album. The band's lighting engineer Bill Butt was chosen to direct the videos and Brian Griffin was chosen to take the photographs for the album's cover, as he had done for the band's two previous albums. With a budget of £16,000, Butt determined that it would be possible to photograph the album cover and also produce a half-hour film. Wishing for the videos to reflect the frigid feel of the music on the album, Butt at first sought to shoot the videos in Scotland, but the lack of snow there in November caused him to change the location of the shoot to Iceland.

Filming took place on and near the frozen Gullfoss waterfall near Reykjavík. McCulloch said in 1993: "If we had slipped there wasn't anything for hundreds of feet below us." In 2001, Griffin said, "... the sun barely appeared the whole time we were there. To walk, stand up, or just think seemed a massive effort." British music magazine Q wrote in 2001: "The Porcupine cover is the epitome of rock band as heroic archetype – young men on some ill-defined but glorious mission, one easily as timeless as the stars and the sea." The filming was finished in December 1982, and the band performed songs from the album at their rehearsal room at The Ministry. Butt interspersed the performances with clips from the 1929 Russian documentary Man with a Movie Camera and projected psychedelic watercolour effects onto the band. A VHS video, titled Porcupine – An Atlas Adventure, was released by Castle Hendring in 1983. It contained six music videos: "In Bluer Skies", "The Cutter", "My White Devil", "Porcupine", "Heads Will Roll" and "The Back of Love".

Describing the album cover, journalist Dave Rimmer wrote in British music magazine Smash Hits: "Iceland does seem an appropriate location for this group. It's isolated, cold, bleak and fits perfectly with the moody image they've attracted to themselves."

=== Musical content ===
Audio samples of Porcupine
"The Cutter" (Alternate Version)
A sample of the original version of "The Cutter" without Shankar's strings. This version was rejected by WEA.

"The Cutter"
The re-recorded version of "The Cutter" from the album with Shankar's strings.

After WEA rejected the first version of the album, Shankar, who had played strings on "The Back of Love", was brought back by Drummond to add strings to the remainder of the album in an effort to brighten the production and to build on the success of the strings used on the single. When recording "The Cutter", Sergeant had asked Shankar if he could suggest the melody from Cat Stevens' 1967 hit "Matthew and Son".

In 1984, McCulloch said: "I think Porcupine was a classic autobiographical album, the most honest thing that I'd ever written or sung." Talking about how the album made him feel, he went on to say: "I found the material from it really heavy to play – like, really oppressive. That's the only reason why I didn't like the album. The songs were great but it didn't make me happy." He also said: "A lot of songs are about coming to terms with the opposites in me."

== Releases ==
Porcupine was first released as an LP by Korova in the United Kingdom on 4 February 1983. It was subsequently released in the United States by Sire Records on 23 February 1983. The original album had ten tracks with five tracks on each side. As with Echo & the Bunnymen's previous album, the album cover was designed by Martyn Atkins and the photography was by Brian Griffin. The album was released on CD on 7 April 1988.

Along with the other four of the band's first five albums, Porcupine was remastered and reissued on CD in 2003 – these releases were marketed as 25th anniversary editions. Seven bonus tracks were added to the album: "Fuel" was the second B-side track on the 12-inch version of "The Back of Love"; alternate versions of "The Cutter", "My White Devil", "Porcupine", "Ripeness" and "Gods Will Be Gods" which were all early versions recorded during the album's sessions; and "Never Stop (Discotheque)" the 12-inch version of the non-album single which was released after Porcupine. The alternate versions of "My White Devil", "Porcupine" and "Ripeness" had all previously been unissued. The reissued album was produced by Andy Zax and Bill Inglot.

Two tracks from the original Porcupine album were released as singles: "The Back of Love", on 21 May 1982, and "The Cutter" on 14 January 1983. "Never Stop (Discotheque)", which was originally a non-album single when it was released on 8 July 1983, subsequently was included on the 2003 remastered version of the album as a bonus track.

== Reception ==
Professional ratings
Review scores
Source	Rating
AllMusic	3.5/5 stars
Blender	4/5 stars
The Guardian	4/5 stars
Pitchfork	9.2/10
Q	3/5 stars
Record Mirror	3/5 stars
The Rolling Stone Album Guide	3.5/5 stars
Smash Hits	8/10
Stylus Magazine	7/10
Uncut	8/10

Following the release of Porcupine in 1983, NME reviewer Barney Hoskyns gave the album a negative review. Hoskyns wrote: "Porcupine is the distressing occasion of an important and exciting rock group becoming ensnared by its own strongest points, a dynamic force striving fruitlessly to escape the brilliant track that trails behind it." Hoskyns likened the sound of the album to the band "turning on their own greatest 'hits' and savaging them". Hoskyns also criticised McCulloch's lyrics and the general mood of the album, noting, "Only on 'Porcupine' itself do the various strains of despair coalesce", and dismissed the entire second side of the album, saying it "horrifies the more for its uniform lack of inspiration, for the fact that every number cops direct from earlier songs without preserving anything of their energy or invention". Record reviewer Wayne King similarly commented that the album reused many motifs, such as Ian McCulloch's octave jumps, from their previous albums. While he praised the opening tracks "The Cutter" and "The Back of Love", he remarked that Porcupine as a whole was not nearly as good an album as Echo and the Bunnymen's live performances showed they were capable of.

In a review of the original release on AllMusic, Porcupine was described as "arguably the band's darkest offering", with the review concluding that the album "holds its own with other revered Bunnymen outings". The website's review of the remastered 2003 version calls the new release "a very well done expansion of an already fine album". Blender magazine described the album in a review on their website as "impossibly exciting pop-rock" and Pitchfork called the album "the band's definitive statement" and described "The Back of Love" as "the astonishing highlight of the group's career". CMJ critic Eric Chappe wrote that "the constant emotional peaks and valleys of Porcupine may be perhaps too strong for some, but the musical peaks achieved in getting there are really something to behold." The album appeared in the 1983 end-of-year critics' lists for both Melody Maker, where it was listed at number nine, and NME, where it was listed at number 32. The album is also listed in the 2006 book 1001 Albums You Must Hear Before You Die.

The album reached number 2 on the UK Albums Chart, number 137 on the American Billboard 200, number 85 on the Canadian RPM 100 Albums, and number 24 on the Swedish albums chart. Having sold over 100,000 copies of the album in the UK, Echo & the Bunnymen were awarded with a gold disc by the British Phonographic Industry. Of the singles from the album, "The Back of Love" reached number 19 on the UK Singles Chart and "The Cutter" reached number 8. "The Back of Love" also became the band's first single to make the Irish Singles Chart when it reached number 24, while "The Cutter" reached number 10. The single "Never Stop (Discotheque)" reached number 15 on the UK Singles Chart and number 8 on the Irish Singles Chart.

== Track listing ==
All tracks written by Will Sergeant, Ian McCulloch, Les Pattinson and Pete de Freitas.

Side one

1. "The Cutter" – 3:56
2. "The Back of Love" – 3:14
3. "My White Devil" – 4:41
4. "Clay" – 4:15
5. "Porcupine" – 6:01

Side two

1. "Heads Will Roll" – 3:33
2. "Ripeness" – 4:50
3. "Higher Hell" – 5:01
4. "Gods Will Be Gods" – 5:25
5. "In Bluer Skies" – 4:33

2003 bonus tracks

11. "Fuel" – 4:09
12. "The Cutter" (Alternate Version) – 4:10
13. "My White Devil" (Alternate Version) – 5:02
14. "Porcupine" (Alternate Version) – 4:04
15. "Ripeness" (Alternate Version) – 4:43
16. "Gods Will Be Gods" (Alternate Version) – 5:31
17. "Never Stop (Discotheque)" – 4:45

Porcupine – An Atlas Adventure

1. "In Bluer Skies"
2. "The Cutter"
3. "My White Devil"
4. "Porcupine"
5. "Heads Will Roll"
6. "The Back of Love"

== Personnel ==
Echo & the Bunnymen

- Ian McCulloch – vocals, guitar, piano
- Will Sergeant – lead guitar
- Les Pattinson – bass
- Pete de Freitas – drums

with:

- Shankar – strings

Technical

- Ian Broudie – producer
- Dave Bascombe – engineer
- Paul Cobald – engineer
- Colin Fairley – engineer
- Dave Woolley – engineer
- Steve Short – engineer
- Steve Presige – engineer
- Brian Griffin – photography
- Martyn Atkins – cover design
- Andy Zax – producer (reissue)
- Bill Inglot – producer (reissue), remastering (reissue)
- Dan Hersch – remastering (reissue)
- Rachel Gutek – cover design (reissue)

== Charts ==
Chart (1983–84)	Peak position
Australian Albums (Kent Music Report)	47
Canada Top Albums/CDs (RPM)	85
New Zealand Albums (RMNZ)	15
Swedish Albums (Sverigetopplistan)	24
UK Albums (Official Charts)	2
US Billboard 200	137

Chart (2021)	Peak position
Scottish Albums (Official Charts)	41

== Certifications ==
Region	Certification	Certified units/sales
United Kingdom (BPI)	Gold	100,000^{^}
^{^} Shipments figures based on certification alone.
