= Make Me Shine =

2001 single by Echo & the Bunnymen

Single by Echo & the Bunnymen

from the album Flowers
- Released: 27 August 2001
- Genre: Alternative rock
- Length: 3:29
- Label: Cooking Vinyl
- Songwriters: Will Sergeant, Ian McCulloch

Echo & the Bunnymen singles chronology
"It's Alright" (2001)	"Make Me Shine" (2001)	"Stormy Weather" (2005)

"Make Me Shine" is a single by Echo & the Bunnymen which was released on 27 August 2001 on the Cooking Vinyl label. It was the second single to be released from the 2001 album, Flowers. It reached number 84 on the UK Singles Chart.

It was originally intended for this to be the first single released from the Flowers album, but this was changed and "It's Alright" was released first.

== Track listings ==
1. "Make Me Shine" (Will Sergeant, Ian McCulloch) – 3:29
2. "Ticket to Ride" (Lennon–McCartney) – 3:21
3. "Nothing Lasts Forever" (acoustic) (Sergeant, McCulloch, Les Pattinson) – 3:33

== Chart positions ==
Chart (2001)	Peak position	Weeks on chart
UK Singles Chart	84	1
