= In the Margins (song) =

2005 single by Echo & the Bunnymen

Single by Echo & the Bunnymen

from the album Siberia
- Released: 31 October 2005
- Genre: Alternative rock
- Length: 3:58
- Label: Cooking Vinyl
- Songwriters: Will Sergeant, Ian McCulloch
- Producer: Hugh Jones

Echo & the Bunnymen singles chronology
"Stormy Weather" (2005)	"In the Margins" (2005)	"Scissors in the Sand" (2006)

"In the Margins" is a single by Echo & the Bunnymen that was released on 31 October 2005 in the UK and on 3 November 2005 in the US It was the second single to be released from the 2005 album, Siberia. It reached number 226 on the UK Singles Chart.

Like their previous single, "Stormy Weather", and the parent album, this single was produced by Hugh Jones who had previously produced the band's 1981 album Heaven Up Here. The cover photograph was taken by Joe Dilworth.

Guitarist magazine said the track reminded them of how the band were once, "sneeringly superior", peers to U2.

== Track listings ==
1. "In the Margins" (radio edit) (Will Sergeant, Ian McCulloch) – 3:58
2. "Nothing Lasts Forever" (acoustic) (Sergeant, McCulloch, Les Pattinson) – 4:10
3. "In the Margins" (instrumental) (Sergeant, McCulloch) – 5:40

== Personnel ==
=== Musicians ===
- Ian McCulloch – vocals, guitar
- Will Sergeant – lead guitar
- Peter Wilkinson – bass
- Paul Fleming – keyboards
- Simon Finley – drums

=== Production ===
- Hugh Jones – producer
- Joe Dilworth – photography
