= Over the Wall (song) =

1981 single by Echo & the Bunnymen

Single by Echo & the Bunnymen

from the album Heaven Up Here
- B-side: "Crocodiles"
- Released: 1981
- Genre: Post-punk
- Label: WEA (Australia)
- Songwriters: Will Sergeant, Ian McCulloch, Les Pattinson, Pete de Freitas
- Producers: The Bunnymen, Hugh Jones

Echo & the Bunnymen singles chronology
"A Promise" (1981)	"Over the Wall" (1981)	"The Back of Love" (1982)

"Over the Wall" is a single by Echo & the Bunnymen from the 1981 album Heaven Up Here. The B-side of the single, which was not released in any other country, was the title track from the band's 1980 debut album, Crocodiles.

== Track listings ==
All tracks written by Will Sergeant, Ian McCulloch, Les Pattinson and Pete de Freitas.

Australian 7" release (WEA 100174)

1. "Over the Wall"
2. "Crocodiles"

== Personnel ==
=== Musicians ===
- Ian McCulloch – vocals, guitar
- Will Sergeant – lead guitar
- Les Pattinson – bass
- Pete de Freitas – drums
