= Bonbon (mobile phone operator) =

Croatian mobile network operator

bonbon
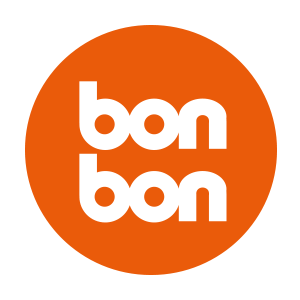
- Type: Public
- Industry: Wireless services Telecommunication
- Founded: October 1st 2010
- Headquarters: Zagreb, Croatia
- Area served: Croatia
- Key people: Diego Pérez-Tenessa de Block (director)
- Services: (SMS, MMS, GSM, GPRS, UMTS, HSDPA, HSPA+, DC-HSPA, LTE)
- Parent: T-Hrvatski Telekom (T-HT)
- Website: www.bonbon.hr

Bonbon (usually stylised as bonbon, in lowercase) is a mobile network operator based in Croatia. It operates as a mobile virtual network operator using the T-Mobile network. It is owned by T-Hrvatski Telekom (T-HT) and was launched on 1 October 2010.

== Summary ==
Bonbon offers exclusively prepaid SIM cards and Internet SIM cards. In October 2011, the number of mobile network customers reached more than 300,000. Bonbon was the first network in Croatia not to have a call setup fee. It differs from other conventional mobile phone operators by not having standardized tariffs but instead lets the users choose the specific combination of voice, SMS and data packages. It presents itself as an on-line brand, with customer service operating exclusively via social networks.

== History ==
Bonbon commenced operations on 1 October 2010, as a mobile virtual network operator using the T-Mobile network. The name bonbon probably originated from the Croatian word for a top-up card (bon). The name also resembles the Croatian word for candy – bombon. Although the correct number of users is widely unknown, in October 2011 the company announced that the number of customers topped 100,000 and in January 2015 they announced over their Facebook page that they had reached more than 200.000 subscribers.

== Products and services ==
=== SIM card ===
The SIM card is the main product. It supports all standard 2G, 3G LTE, and 5G services. The SIM card can be acquired in two ways: by purchasing one at the newsstand or ordering one from the bonbon website. As bonbon uses the T-Mobile network, the SIM can function only with mobile phones that are either unlocked or locked to the T-Mobile network. Bonbon is known to offer the smallest top-up card on the market for 10 kunas.

=== Internet SIM card ===
The Internet SIM card can be acquired exclusively on Bonbon's web shop. It automatically activates once the user starts using it. It allows the user to send and receive SMSs but does not permit voice calls.

=== Services ===
One of the specific and unique features of bonbon is the fact that it does not have standardized tariffs, but instead, lets the users choose the specific combination and quantity of voice, SMS and data packages. It introduced this feature on 15 February 2011. Bonbon was also the first network in Croatia not to have a call setup fee. Bonbon is the only network that permits users the possibility of choosing their own number. In May 2012 it became the first network to allow money transfers from one bonbon account to another, free of charge. The bonbon web shop is the main channel of distribution and one of the main communication channels.

== Customer service ==
Bonbon's customer service maintains a permanent on-line presence and can be reached at all times. It relies on members of the service team to provide timely answers to questions raised by users. The customer service consists of a team of approximately 30 people that are on-line 0-24 and can be reached through social media channels – Facebook, X (Formerly Twitter), Google+, forum, chat and by e-mail. It has been reported that bonbon fancies this type of approach because of the direct access to the users and the low cost of operation set up.

== Marketing ==
=== Advertising ===
Bonbon is known for its edgy and sometimes provocative advertising. Some ads depicted sexually charged imagery. In 2012, bonbon published a YouTube video, a longer version of its TV ad that portrayed two girls kissing, causing a stir in the local media, but drawing praises from LGBT friendly web sites.

=== Awards and acknowledgments ===
In 2011, bonbon was a finalist at the Effie awards in the telecommunication category. The agency responsible for the work awarded was Digitel, from Zagreb.

In 2012, bonbon was the recipient of a couple of awards. At the annual national advertising festival, IdejaX, it won the prize for its pre-movie videos ‘Moron’, ‘Jerk’ and ‘Idiot’ that were done by the ad agency Fahrenheit. It also picked up a prize for best production for its TV ad done by Publicis Zagreb. At the Sudnji dan festival, ‘Moron’, ‘Jerk’ and ‘Idiot’ picked up another award, this time for best copywriting. At the 2012 Vidi awards, bonbon's site was awarded 5th place in the Corporate website category. The Web site is the work of Nivas, a Zagreb-based digital agency.

=== Sponsorships ===
Bonbon has a consistent policy of sponsorship, regularly preferring open-air festivals. So far it has sponsored the Šibenik-based Terraneo festival, an indie music festival, and Gričevanje, a music festival in the center of Zagreb, the capital of Croatia.
