= Think I Need It Too =

2009 single by Echo & the Bunnymen

Single by Echo & the Bunnymen

from the album The Fountain
- Released: 28 September 2009
- Recorded: Parr Street Studios, Liverpool
- Genre: Alternative rock
- Length: 3:41
- Label: Ocean Rain
- Songwriters: Ian McCulloch, John McLaughlin, Simon Perry, David Thomas, Will Sergeant
- Producers: John McLaughlin, Ian McCulloch, Simon Perry

Echo & the Bunnymen singles chronology
"Scissors in the Sand" (2006)	"Think I Need It Too" (2009)

"Think I Need It Too" is a song by the British rock band Echo & the Bunnymen. The song was released as a single on 28 September 2009 on Ocean Rain Records. It is the first single from the band's eleventh studio album, The Fountain (2009).

== Background ==
The song developed from sessions lead singer Ian McCulloch had with three London-based musicians. McCulloch said, "I thought [guitarist Will Sergeant and I] needed to do stuff differently, but so the result still sounded like the Bunnymen." McCulloch felt that the sound was right and he and Sergeant returned to the studio to record material for Fountain, including "Think I Need It Too".

== Reception ==
NME compared "Think I Need It Too" to Echo & the Bunnymen's 1987 song "Lips Like Sugar" when they described it as an "anthemic, radio friendly love song". They went on to describe McCulloch's voice as "the lustiest voice we've heard for years".

"Think I Need It Too" reached number thirty-nine on Billboard magazine's Hot Singles Sales chart in the United States.

== Track listing ==
1. "Think I Need It Too (Album Version)" – 3:41
2. "November (Album Version)" – 4:04

== Personnel ==
- Ian McCulloch – vocals, producer
- Will Sergeant – guitar
- John McLaughlin – producer
- Simon Perry – producer
- David Thomas – mixing
- Andrea Wright – additional production
