= Bombones =

Spanish pop group

Spanish pop band formed by Juan Azagra (Juano) vocals and guitar, Francisco Barroso (Francis) guitar, Isidro Lucuix bass, Carlos Moreno keyboard and synthesizers and Miguel Ángel Campos (Goyo) drums.

== History ==
Bombones was born in Seville, (Spain), in early 2000s, where due to the love of the music that characterize both Juano and Goyo (working in a record store), they decided to join with Francis and Eduardo "Pollito" (former bass player) to play unusual power-pop covers, like Matthew Sweet, Velvet Crush or Redd Kross.

Gradually, the own compositions began to take prominence in their set list. This concluded with the recording of a demo in 2002 at the Central Studio in Seville. The title that labels this first work was "Mary Jane EP". Five songs and one re-mix were included. "Mary Jane", the one that it would become first single of the band, it was one of the themes you could find in the EP.

In October 2003, Bombones became finalist of the national demo competition organized by Rock Indiana. The result was obtained thanks to the popular voting by Internet. Eventually, the group was winning after a hard-fought final at the Moby Dick club in Madrid, and they took the first prize: recording an LP with the organizing record label of the contest, Rock-Indiana.

In February 2004, the band arrived at the Paco Loco's studio in Puerto de Santa Maria, trying to sign one of the best records within the Spanish pop panorama. After a week Bombones defied any expectation with a contemporary pop disc, approaching bands like Fountains of Wayne or Farrah.

== Discography ==
=== EPs ===
- A Kiss Supreme (2005)

=== LPs ===
- Bombones, (2004)
- El Eterno Invierno, (2007)

=== Collaborations ===
- Una luz que nunca se apagará-Tributo a The Smiths. Song: "Girlfriend in a Coma".
- Play the game-Tributo a Echo & the Bunnymen. Song: "It's Alright".
- La revolución de los colores. Songs: "Mary Jane" & "Love Shines".
