= Thunder Bay bon bons =

Canadian Chinese dish

- Type: Fried ribs
- Place of origin: Thunder Bay, Ontario
- Associated cuisine: Canadian Chinese cuisine
- Created by: Lam Pang
- Invented: 1946
- Serving temperature: Hot
- Main ingredients: Pork spare ribs

Thunder Bay bon bons are a dish from Canadian Chinese cuisine. It is made by deep frying pork spare ribs.

== History ==
The dish was invented by Chinese restaurant owner Lam Pang in Thunder Bay, Ontario in 1946. He first immigrated from Taishan, Guangdong to Canada as a child and learned how to cook onboard ships before founding a restaurant called Pang's. Pang invented the "bon bons" as a quick dish to serve to guests at a house party he was catering.

The dish is often served at restaurants in Thunder Bay where it is popularly paired with beer. It is considered to be an important part of Canadian Chinese cuisine.

== Description ==
Thunder Bay bon bons are made by tossing pork spare ribs in cornstarch and seasoning before deep frying them in oil. The ribs are usually seasoned with five-spice powder and served with lemon.
