= Bonbon (disambiguation) =

Bonbon refers to any of several types of sweets, especially small candies enrobed in chocolate.

Bonbon, Bonbons, Bon Bon or Bon-Bon may also refer to:

== Geography ==
- Bon Bon Reserve, South Australia
- 222 Margaret Street, Brisbane Bon Bon Tower, nickname for the skyscraper in Brisbane, Australia
- Bonbon, Grand'Anse, a commune in Haiti

== Music ==
- Bon Bon (singer), American vocalist
- Bon-Bon Blanco (sometimes B3), a Japanese rock group active 2002–2009
- Bon-Bon (vocal group), Bulgarian children's ensemble
- Les Bonbons (album), Jacques Brel
- "Bon, Bon", 2010 song by Pitbull from Armando
- "BonBon", 2016 song by Era Istrefi
- "Bon Bon", 1957 song by The Four Voices
- "Les Bonbons", 1964 song by Jacques Brel
- "Bon Bon Bon", song by Vanessa Quinones
- "Shake Your Bon-Bon", 1999 single by Ricky Martin, in which "bon-bon" is a colloquial euphemism for buttocks

== Other uses ==
- Bon-Bon (short story), by Edgar Allan Poe, featuring character Pierre Bon-Bon
- Bonbon (mobile phone operator), brand in Croatian mobile communications market owned by T-Mobile
- BonBon-Land, amusement park based on the candy brand
- Bon Bon, transvestite character in the 2000 film Before Night Falls, played by Johnny Depp
- Bon Bon, a name given to fictional characters in the My Little Pony franchise, each in different generations respectively
- Comic BomBom, sometimes romanised as 'Comic BonBon', a Japanese manga magazine
- Bon bon chicken, a dish in Chinese cuisine
- Thunder Bay bon bons, a fried spare rib dish in Canadian Chinese cuisine
- Bon-Bon, a minor antagonist from the game Five Nights at Freddy's: Sister Location
- Bonbon, a grape beverage manufactured by Haitai.
- Bon Bon, a nickname for an electric locomotive ESS 3200 Class in Indonesia

== See also ==
- Bon (disambiguation)
- Christmas cracker
