= Get in the Car =

1999 single by Echo & the Bunnymen

Single by Echo & the Bunnymen

from the album What Are You Going to Do with Your Life?
- Released: 1999
- Genre: Alternative rock
- Length: 3:05
- Label: London
- Songwriters: Will Sergeant, Ian McCulloch

Echo & the Bunnymen singles chronology
"Rust" (1999)	"Get in the Car" (1999)	"'Avalanche'" (2000)

"Get in the Car" is a single by Echo & the Bunnymen which was released in 1999. It was the second single to be released from their 1999 album, What Are You Going to Do with Your Life?.

Released by London Records as a CD single, it contains two versions of the title track, the album version and a radio edit, as well as live versions of "Bedbugs and Ballyhoo" and "Rescue". The title track was written by Will Sergeant and Ian McCulloch.

== Track listings ==
1. "Get in the Car" (radio edit) (Will Sergeant, Ian McCulloch) – 3:05
2. "Bedbugs and Ballyhoo" (live) (Sergeant, McCulloch, Les Pattinson, Pete de Freitas)
3. "Rescue" (live) (Sergeant, McCulloch, Pattinson, de Freitas)
4. "Get in the Car" (Sergeant, McCulloch) – 4:22
