= Avalanche (EP) =

2000 album by Echo & the Bunnymen

EP by Echo & the Bunnymen
- Released: October 2000
- Genre: Post-punk
- Length: 20:29
- Label: Gimme Music
- Producer: Ian McCulloch, Will Sergeant

Echo & the Bunnymen chronology
Get in the Car (1999)	Avalanche (2000)	It's Alright (2001)

Avalanche is an EP that was released in October 2000 by Echo & the Bunnymen. The EP was released on CD by Gimme Music and was only available to buy on the internet.

== Overview ==
The first track on the original EP is a cover version of American folk musician Tim Hardin's song "How Can We Hang On to a Dream?", with the title changed to "Hang on to a Dream". The second track, "Avalanche", was a new song by the band. The next three tracks ("All My Colours (Zimbo)", "Silver" and "Angels and Devils") are re-recordings of songs previously released by the band. The final track of the original EP is a cover of the Bob Dylan song "It's All Over Now, Baby Blue" with the title listed as "It's All Over Now".

In 2003 the EP was re-released with two bonus tracks: the first being the Electrafixion version of "Baseball Bill" and the second being a remixed version called "Baseball Bill (Sgt Fuzz Remix)".

== Track listing ==
=== Original release ===
1. "Hang on to a Dream" (Tim Hardin) – 2:26
2. "Avalanche" (Will Sergeant, Ian McCulloch) – 3:27
3. "All My Colours (Zimbo)" (Sergeant, McCulloch, Les Pattinson, Pete de Freitas) – 4:12
4. "Silver" (Sergeant, McCulloch, Pattinson, de Freitas) – 3:18
5. "Angels and Devils" (Sergeant, McCulloch, Pattinson, de Freitas) – 3:31
6. "It's All Over Now (Baby Blue)" (Bob Dylan) – 3:35

=== 2003 reissue ===
7. "Baseball Bill (Electrafixion Version)" (Sergeant, McCulloch) – 4:43
8. "Baseball Bill (Sgt Fuzz Remix)" (Sergeant, McCulloch) – 4:35

== Personnel ==
=== Musicians ===
- Ian McCulloch – vocals, guitar
- Will Sergeant – lead guitar
- Alex Gleave – bass
- Ceri James – keyboards
- Vinnie Jamieson – drums

=== Production ===
- Ian McCulloch – producer
- Will Sergeant – producer
- Tim Speed – engineer
- Nick Allen – sleeve artwork
