= Flowers (Echo & the Bunnymen album) =

Studio album by Echo & the Bunnymen
- Released: 14 May 2001 (UK); 22 May 2001 (USA)
- Recorded: Elevator Studios, Liverpool and Bryn Derwyn Studios, Snowdonia, Wales
- Genre: Post-punk, alternative rock
- Length: 45:29
- Label: Cooking Vinyl
- Producer: Ian McCulloch, Will Sergeant

Echo & the Bunnymen chronology
What Are You Going to Do with Your Life? (1999)	Flowers (2001)	Crystal Days: 1979–1999 (2002)

Singles from Flowers
- 1. "It's Alright" Released: 23 April 2001; 2. "Make Me Shine" Released: 27 August 2001

Professional ratings
Aggregate scores
Source	Rating
Metacritic	70/100
Review scores
Source	Rating
AllMusic	3.5/5 stars
NME	7/10
Pitchfork Media	8.0/10
Rolling Stone	3.5/5 stars
Spin	3/10

Flowers is the ninth studio album released by the English rock band Echo & the Bunnymen in May 2001. It reached number 56 on the UK Albums Chart. The album was recorded at the Elevator Studios in Liverpool and the Bryn Derwyn Studios in Wales and produced by Ian McCulloch and Will Sergeant, with additional production by Pete Coleman. Flowers included the singles "It's Alright" and "Make Me Shine". The cover art is from a book by Michael Lesy called Wisconsin Death Trip (1973). It is about a town in Wisconsin called Black River Falls during the Victorian era.

== Reception ==
MacKenzie Wilson of AllMusic gave the album a 4.5 stars rating, praising the sound of album saying "Still clinging to the post-punk snarl that made them cult favourites during the '80s, Echo and the Bunnymen's Ian McCulloch and Will Sergeant maintain a stunning inventiveness as they enter into the third decade of the band." she also observed, "McCulloch isn't an angst-ridden punk -- he's aged with class -- and Sergeant's typically moody guitar work has mellowed." concluding "Flowers doesn't possess the initial fiery power of the band's first four albums, but the underlying concept that brought McCulloch and Sergeant together in 1978 is what matters, and this album holds true to such a bond."

Wall of Sound gave a positive review, stating "Flowers features the familiar psychedelic-tinged pop songwriting, chiming guitars, and unmistakable voice that have always been the group's trademark, but 20 years down the road, experience, nostalgia, and longing have tempered the band's sound."

CDNow criticised McCulloch's vocals, "The problem with Flowers is that McCulloch's voice never soars. He still has the timbre, but he's lost his range and forcefulness, resulting in a lost sense of urgency."

Spin dismissed the album as "One jaded plod after another."

== Track listing ==
All tracks written by Ian McCulloch and Will Sergeant.

1. "King of Kings" – 4:24
2. "SuperMellowMan" – 4:58
3. "Hide & Seek" – 4:07
4. "Make Me Shine" – 3:54
5. "It's Alright" – 3:32
6. "Buried Alive" – 3:55
7. "Flowers" – 4:16
8. "Everybody Knows" – 4:40
9. "Life Goes On" – 3:59
10. "An Eternity Turns" – 4:03
11. "Burn for Me" – 3:41

== Personnel ==
=== Musicians ===
- Ian McCulloch – vocals, guitar, piano
- Will Sergeant – lead guitar, tambourine
- Alex Germains – bass, backing vocals
- Ceri James – keyboards
- Vincent Jamieson – drums, congas, tambourine, shakers

=== Production ===
- Ian McCulloch – producer
- Will Sergeant – producer
- Pete Coleman – additional production, engineer, mixing
- Mike Hunter – additional engineering
- David Blackman – mastered by
- Stu Reed – pro-tools
- Andrew Swainson – design, photography

== Charts ==
Chart (2001)	Peak position
Scottish Albums (OCC)	54
UK Albums (OCC)	56
UK Independent Albums (OCC)	10

Chart (2021)	Peak position
Scottish Albums (OCC)	51
UK Independent Albums (OCC)	26
