= Rust (song) =

1999 single by Echo & the Bunnymen

- CD#1 cover

Single by Echo & the Bunnymen

from the album What Are You Going to Do with Your Life?
- Released: 15 March 1999
- Genre: Alternative rock
- Length: 5:26
- Label: London
- Songwriters: Will Sergeant, Ian McCulloch
- Producers: Alan Douglas, Ian McCulloch, Paul Toogood

Echo & the Bunnymen singles chronology
"(How Does It Feel to Be) On Top of the World" (1998)	"Rust" (1999)	"Get in the Car" (1999)

CD#2 cover

"Rust" is a single by Echo & the Bunnymen which was released in March 1999. It was the first single to be released from their 1999 album, What Are You Going to Do with Your Life?. It reached number 22 on the UK Singles Chart and currently remains their last UK Top 40 hit.

== Overview ==
The single was released on London Records as a 7-inch single and as two separate CD versions. Apart from the title track, all three releases had different track listings. The two CD versions had different covers.

The title track was written by Will Sergeant and Ian McCulloch; Les Pattinson had left the band to look after his ailing mother by this time. The lyrics and melody for its chorus are borrowed from McCulloch's 1992 b-side song "Ribbons and Chains." The release was jointly produced by Alan Douglas, McCulloch, and Paul Toogood. The title track was mixed by Mark Stent while the other tracks were mixed by Mike Hunter.

== Track listings ==
All tracks written by Will Sergeant and Ian McCulloch.

7-inch release (London LON424 and 570 394-7)

1. "Rust" (radio edit)
2. "The Fish Hook Girl"

CD No. 1 release (London LONCD424)

1. "Rust" (radio edit) – 4:17
2. "The Fish Hook Girl" – 4:39
3. "See the Horizon" – 4:03

CD No. 2 release (London LOCDP424)

1. "Rust" – 5:26
2. "Sense of Life" – 4:18
3. "Beyond the Green" – 2:43

== Chart positions ==
Chart (1999)	Peak position
UK Singles Chart	22

== Personnel ==
- Ian McCulloch – vocals, guitar
- Will Sergeant – lead guitar
- Guy Pratt – bass
- Jeremy Stacey – drums
- Alan Douglas – producer
- Ian McCulloch – producer
- Paul Toogood – producer
- Mark Stent – audio mixing
- Mike Hunter – audio mixing
