= Siberia (Echo & the Bunnymen album) =

Studio album by Echo & the Bunnymen
- Released: 20 September 2005
- Genre: Alternative rock, post-punk, neo-psychedelia
- Length: 51:18
- Label: Cooking Vinyl
- Producer: Hugh Jones

Echo & the Bunnymen chronology
| Live in Liverpool (2001) | Siberia (2005) | Seven Seas (2005) |

Singles from Siberia
- 1. "Stormy Weather" Released: 5 September 2005; 2. "In the Margins" Released: 31 October 2005; 3. "Scissors in the Sand" Released: 5 June 2006

Siberia is the tenth studio album by Echo & the Bunnymen. It was released on 20 September 2005 and received mixed reviews and was consequently the band's first album not to enter into the UK Top 75 Albums Chart.

The track "Of a Life" has the line "I want a song to learn and sing", which name-checks the band's 1985 compilation album Songs to Learn and Sing.

== Reception ==
Professional ratings
Aggregate scores
| Source | Rating |
|---|---|
| Metacritic | 66/100 |
Review scores
| Source | Rating |
| AllMusic | 4/5 stars |
| The Guardian | 4/5 stars |
| NME | (3/10) |
| Pitchfork Media | (6.7/10) |
| Slant Magazine | 3/5 stars |
| Spin | (favourable) |
| Stylus Magazine | (B) |
| Uncut | 2/5 stars |

At Metacritic, which assigns a normalised rating out of 100 to reviews from mainstream critics, Siberia received an average score of 66, based on 17 reviews, indicating "generally favorable reviews".

== Track listing ==
All tracks written by Ian McCulloch and Will Sergeant.

1. "Stormy Weather" – 4:24
2. "All Because of You Days" – 5:44
3. "Parthenon Drive" – 5:11
4. "In the Margins" – 5:06
5. "Of a Life" – 3:44
6. "Make Us Blind" – 4:00
7. "Everything Kills You" – 4:17
8. "Siberia" – 4:56
9. "Sideways Eight" – 3:16
10. "Scissors in the Sand" – 5:29
11. "What If We Are?" – 5:09

== Personnel ==
Echo & the Bunnymen

- Ian McCulloch - guitar, vocals
- Will Sergeant - lead guitar

with:

- Peter Wilkinson - bass
- Paul Fleming - keyboards
- Simon Finley - drums
- Hillary Browning - cello on "Everything Kills You" and "What If We Are?"
- Kate Evans, Martin Richardson - violin on "Everything Kills You" and "What If We Are?"
- John Robert Shepley - viola on "Everything Kills You" and "What If We Are?"
- Mimi McCulloch - tambourine on "In the Margins"

== Charts ==
| Chart (2005) | Peak position |
|---|---|
| Belgian Albums (Ultratop Flanders) | 96 |
| French Albums (SNEP) | 161 |
| Scottish Albums (OCC) | 68 |
| UK Albums (OCC) | 83 |
| UK Independent Albums (OCC) | 11 |

| Chart (2021) | Peak position |
|---|---|
| Scottish Albums (OCC) | 37 |
| UK Independent Albums (OCC) | 17 |
