= Stormy Weather (Echo & the Bunnymen song) =

2005 single by Echo & the Bunnymen

Single by Echo & the Bunnymen

from the album Siberia
- Released: 5 September 2005
- Recorded: Elevator Studios, Liverpool
- Genre: Alternative rock, jangle pop
- Length: 3:07
- Label: Cooking Vinyl
- Songwriters: Will Sergeant, Ian McCulloch
- Producer: Hugh Jones

Echo & the Bunnymen singles chronology
"Make Me Shine" (2001)	"Stormy Weather" (2005)	"In the Margins" (2005)

"Stormy Weather" is a single by Echo & the Bunnymen which was released on 5 September 2005 on the Cooking Vinyl label. It was the first single to be released from the 2005 album, Siberia. It reached number 55 on the UK Singles Chart.

== Overview ==
The single and its parent album re-united the band with Hugh Jones, who produced their second album, 1981's Heaven Up Here. At the time Jones said that the Siberia work was the best he had ever done. The song was written by Will Sergeant and Ian McCulloch and it was recorded at Elevator Studios in The Bunnymen's home town of Liverpool. The cover of the single shows a photograph of Sergeant and McCulloch which was taken in Berlin by photographer Joe Dilworth.

Released on the Cooking Vinyl label, the single was available as a CD single (FRY CD246), a 7-inch single (FRY 246) and digital downloads – both as an individual track (FRY DL246) and as a bundled download (FRY DL246X) – which were available from the band's official website. On 14 November 2005, a live version of the song was also released which had been recorded at an HMV store. The acoustic versions of "Make Me Shine", "Nothing Lasts Forever" and "Lips Like Sugar", which are on the 7-inch single and the bundled download, are taken from a live session for Brazilian radio.

== Reception ==
Generally the song was received favourably by the critics, with the release being seen as a return to the band's 1980s form: Collective described the song as an "epic air-puncher" and says the band sounds better than anyone who has been around for 26 years has a right to; the download service Wippit's newsletter said the single "signifies a return to the magnificence of the band's glory days"; and The Oakland Tribune said the song was "moody and catchy" and that it was "a slice of classic'80s-style Echo".

Whilst being a hit with the critics, the song only achieved moderate success with the fans, reaching number 55 on the UK Singles Chart.

== Track listings ==
All tracks written by Will Sergeant and Ian McCulloch except where noted.

CD version (Cooking Vinyl FRY CD246)

1. "Stormy Weather" (radio edit) – 3:07
2. "What If We Are" (vocal and strings mix) – 5:09
3. "Stormy Weather" (instrumental version) – 4:31

7-inch version (Cooking Vinyl FRY 246)

1. "Stormy Weather" (radio edit) – 3:07
2. "Make Me Shine" (acoustic version) – 3:10

Digital download version (Cooking Vinyl FRY DL246)

1. "Stormy Weather" (radio edit) – 3:07

Digital bundle version (Cooking Vinyl FRY DL246X)

1. "Stormy Weather" (radio edit) – 3:07
2. "Nothing Lasts Forever" (acoustic version) (Sergeant, McCulloch, Les Pattinson)
3. "Lips Like Sugar" (acoustic version) (Sergeant, McCulloch, Pattinson, Pete de Freitas)

Digital live HMV session

1. "Stormy Weather" (live HMV session) – 3:09

== Chart positions ==
Chart (2005)	Peak position
UK Singles Chart	55

== Personnel ==
=== Musicians ===
- Ian McCulloch – vocals, guitar
- Will Sergeant – lead guitar
- Peter Wilkinson – bass
- Paul Fleming – keyboards
- Simon Finley – drums

=== Production ===
- Hugh Jones – producer, mixed by, engineering
- Dave Blackman – mastered by
- Andrea Wright – engineering
- Matt Edge – engineering, engineering (mix)
- Sean Sinnott – engineering (mix assistant)
- Joe Dilworth – photography
- Ged Doyle – sleeve design
