= Heaven Up Here =

1981 studio album by Echo & the Bunnymen

Studio album by Echo & the Bunnymen
- Released: 29 May 1981
- Recorded: March 1981
- Studio: Rockfield (Rockfield, Wales)
- Genre: Post-punk; neo-psychedelia
- Length: 43:03
- Label: Korova
- Producer: Hugh Jones, The Bunnymen

Echo & the Bunnymen chronology
Crocodiles (1980)	Heaven Up Here (1981)	Porcupine (1983)

Singles from Heaven Up Here
- 1. "A Promise" Released: 10 July 1981; 2. "Over the Wall" Released: 1981

Heaven Up Here is the second album by the English post-punk band Echo & the Bunnymen, released on 29 May 1981. In June 1981, Heaven Up Here became Echo & the Bunnymen's first Top 10 release when it reached number 10 on the UK Albums Chart. It was also the band's first entry into the United States album charts when it reached number 184 of the Billboard 200. The songs "A Promise" and "Over the Wall" were released as singles.

Recorded at Rockfield Studios near Monmouth in Wales, Heaven Up Here was co-produced by Hugh Jones and the band. An album generally well received by fans in the United Kingdom and by critics, Heaven Up Here won the "Best Dressed LP" and "Best Album" awards at the 1981 NME Awards. The album has also been listed at number 463 in Rolling Stone magazine's list of the 500 greatest albums of all time.

== Background and recording ==
After the public and press interest garnered from Echo & the Bunnymen's debut album, Crocodiles, the band released the Shine So Hard EP which maintained their profile. Work then soon began on their second album, Heaven Up Here. Following musical differences between the band and Crocodiles producers Bill Drummond and David Balfe, Hugh Jones was brought in to produce Heaven Up Here. Jones had previously engineered Crocodiles and co-produced Shine So Hard with Drummond, and would later go on to produce the band's 2005 album Siberia. The band were also given an additional producer credit. The album was recorded at Rockfield Studios near Monmouth in Wales during March 1981.

In the liner notes to the 2003 remastered version of the album, lead singer Ian McCulloch said that he constantly had the American rock band the Velvet Underground's song "What Goes On" in the back of his mind. He also stated that the band wanted to record a soul album. In the same liner notes, bassist Les Pattinson said that the band was often lazy and hence had hired rehearsal space at the Ministry in Liverpool. He said this made them work harder and develop "language" in the rhythm. According to guitarist Will Sergeant, McCulloch considers Heaven Up Here to be Sergeant's album because he was bossy and a control freak during the recording.

== Music ==
In 1981, music magazine NME described the album as darker and more passionate than 1980's Crocodiles. Record Mirror also said that the band sang the blues and devoted themselves to existential sadness. They went on to note that the album offered "an anatomy of melancholy, resplendent with the glamour of doom". Melody Maker disagreed when in 1981 they said "the Bunnymen are continuing to play majestic, uplifting music that will shine through the dark days ahead of us". In the 2002 book Turquoise Days: The Weird World of Echo & the Bunnymen, author Chris Adams said that in 1995 McCulloch had said, "That spikey edge [of the album] still stands up." In relation to their style of music, in 1980 McCulloch had said, "I always say 'We're a rock band'. Because I'm proud of that." He added, "I like rock music [...] I prefer being good or great within that basic format [...] I just prefer basic songs."

In his 2005 book Rip It Up and Start Again: Post Punk 1978–1984, British music journalist Simon Reynolds described the sound of Heaven Up Here as having been filled out with "guitar overdubs, keyboard glints, vocal multitracking and atmospheric vapours". Comparing Heaven Up Here with Joy Division's 1980 album Closer, Reynolds said they are "harrowed by the same things [...] hypocrisy, distrust, betrayal, lost or frozen potential". However, he said that "Closer shows Ian Curtis fatally mesmerized by his own dread visions, Heaven Up Here ultimately turns its face towards the light" with the tracks "No Dark Things" – which he describes as renouncing "death-wishful thinking" – and "All I Want" – which he describes as "a blasting celebration of desire for desire's sake" and "pure intransitive exhilaration".

== Cover ==
The photograph used on the front and back cover of the album was taken by photographer Brian Griffin. The picture shows the band on a wet beach in the south Wales seaside town of Porthcawl; there are dark clouds in the sky and the sun is low on the horizon causing the band to be silhouetted. The picture was taken on a day off from recording the album. The original album's cover art was designed by Martyn Atkins. According to Griffin, they used buckets of fish offal to entice the gulls to fly into shot. He also stated that both Drummond and Rob Dickins, head of their record label Korova, hated the pictures from the shoot, and that he and Atkins had to fight for them to be used on the sleeve. The cover received the "Best Dressed LP" award in the 1981 NME Awards. Reynolds said that the band's manager, Drummond, saw them as representing "cold, dampness, darkness".

The front cover picture of the original album was kept for the 2003 reissue. However, the design was altered slightly by graphic designer Rachel Gutek of the design company guppyart. The release contained an expanded booklet written by music journalist Max Bell giving the background to the album. The booklet also contains a number of photographs which are credited to Sergeant and Pattinson.

== Releases ==
The album was originally released as an LP by Korova in the United Kingdom on 29 May 1981. It was then released in the United States by Sire Records on 24 June 1981. It was released elsewhere on Korova, although with a different catalogue number. Side one of the LP contained five tracks and side two had six. The album was first released on CD on 16 May 1988.

Along with the others of the band's first five albums, the album was remastered and reissued on CD in 2003 containing five bonus tracks – these releases were marketed as 25th anniversary editions. "Broke My Neck (Long Version)", recorded at Tistedal Studios in Norway on 7 June 1981, is the B-side of the 12-inch single "A Promise" – an edited version was used as the B-side of the 7-inch single. The other four bonus tracks were recorded live at the Manly Vale Hotel in Sydney, Australia, on 11 November 1981. The reissued album was produced by music historian Andy Zax and producer Bill Inglot.

The only single from Heaven Up Here released worldwide was "A Promise" on 10 July 1981. The single stayed on the UK Singles Chart for four weeks and reached number 49. Later that year, "Over the Wall" was released as a single in Australia only.

== Reception ==
Professional ratings
Review scores
Source	Rating
AllMusic	4/5 stars
Blender	3/5 stars
The Guardian	5/5 stars
Mojo	5/5 stars
Pitchfork	8.0/10
Q	4/5 stars
Record Mirror	5/5 stars
The Rolling Stone Album Guide	2/5 stars
Smash Hits	9/10
The Village Voice	C

Heaven Up Here was generally well received by the music press and critics. In a 1982 interview with the band for the NME, rock journalist Barney Hoskyns described the album as "one of the most superior articulations of 'rock' form in living memory." Later reviews have continued to receive the album well: AllMusic reviewer Aaron Warshaw said that McCulloch "sings with soaring abandon and passion throughout the album" and that Sergeant's guitar playing was at its "angular finest". Not all reviews were positive: Robert Christgau of The Village Voice said that he held "no brief against tuneless caterwaul, but tuneless psychedelic caterwaul has always been another matter." In his 1999 book From the Shores of Lake Placid and Other Stories, the band's manager Bill Drummond said "The album is dull as ditchwater. The songs are unformed, the sound uniformly grey."

Heaven Up Here sold well in the United Kingdom, staying on the UK Albums Chart for a total of 16 weeks and reaching a peak of number 10 in June 1981. The album was the first release by Echo & the Bunnymen to make it onto the American charts when it reached number 184 on the Billboard 200.

In 2012, the album ranked number 463 on Rolling Stone magazine's list of the 500 greatest albums of all time. The NME ranked the album number 39 on its list of the 50 greatest albums of the 1980s and number 51 on its list of the greatest albums of all time. The album also received the NME's 1981 best album award. Reynolds described the award as "essentially an anti-New Pop protest vote by post-punk's silent majority".

== Legacy ==
The song "The Disease" was covered — re-titled as "From Heaven" — in 2024 by American industrial metal band Static-X for their album Project Regeneration Vol. 2; it is based on an archival vocal recording of late frontman Wayne Static who died in 2014.

== Track listing ==
All tracks written by Will Sergeant, Ian McCulloch, Les Pattinson and Pete de Freitas.

Side one

1. "Show of Strength" – 4:50
2. "With a Hip" – 3:16
3. "Over the Wall" – 5:59
4. "It Was a Pleasure" – 3:12
5. "A Promise" – 4:08

Side two

1. "Heaven Up Here" – 3:45
2. "The Disease" – 2:28
3. "All My Colours" – 4:06
4. "No Dark Things" – 4:27
5. "Turquoise Days" – 3:51
6. "All I Want" – 4:09

2003 reissue bonus tracks

12. "Broke My Neck" (long version) – 7:22
13. "Show of Strength" (live) – 4:41
14. "The Disease" (live) – 1:53
15. "All I Want" (live) – 3:09
16. "Zimbo" (live) – 3:52

== Personnel ==
Echo & the Bunnymen

- Will Sergeant – lead guitar
- Ian McCulloch – vocals, rhythm guitar
- Les Pattinson – bass
- Pete de Freitas – drums

with:

- Les Penning – woodwind

Technical

- Hugh Jones – producer, engineer
- The Bunnymen – producer
- Martyn Atkins – album design
- Brian Griffin – photography
- Andy Zax – producer (reissue)
- Bill Inglot – producer (reissue), remastering
- Dan Hersch – remastering
- Claes Neeb – engineering on "Broke My Neck" (long version)
- Rachel Gutek – album design (reissue)

== Charts ==
Chart (1981–1982)	Peak position
New Zealand Albums (RMNZ)	17
UK Albums (OCC)	10
US Billboard 200	184

Chart (2021–2025)	Peak position
Croatian International Albums (HDU)	11
Scottish Albums (OCC)	46
