= Never Stop (Echo & the Bunnymen song) =

1983 single by Echo & the Bunnymen

Single by Echo & the Bunnymen
- B-side: "Heads Will Roll" / "The Original Cutter"
- Released: 8 July 1983
- Recorded: June 1983
- Studio: RAK Studios, London
- Genre: Post-punk
- Length: 3:31
- Label: Korova / WEA
- Songwriters: Will Sergeant, Ian McCulloch, Les Pattinson, Pete de Freitas
- Producers: Hugh Jones, Ian Broudie

Echo & the Bunnymen singles chronology
"The Cutter" (1983)	"Never Stop" (1983)	"The Killing Moon" (1984)

"Never Stop" is a single which was released by the British post-punk band Echo & the Bunnymen on 8 July 1983. It reached number fifteen on the UK Singles Chart the same month. The title track on the 12-inch single is a remixed version called "Never Stop (Discotheque)" and is another minute and fifteen seconds longer.

The B-side of the 7-inch single is "Heads Will Roll" and the B-sides of the 12-inch single are an expanded version called "Heads Will Roll (Summer Version)" and "The Original Cutter". While Hugh Jones produced the A-side, the B-sides were produced by Ian Broudie under the pseudonym Kingbird.

Primarily released as a single, the 12" extended version of "Never Stop" also appeared on the 12-inch mini-album The Sound of Echo. It was subsequently included on the 2003 remastered version of the Porcupine album as well as a number of compilation albums. "Never Stop (Discotheque)" was also used in the 2006 film The History Boys and was included on the subsequent soundtrack album.

== Track listings ==
All tracks written by Will Sergeant, Ian McCulloch, Les Pattinson and Pete de Freitas.

7" release (Korova KOW 28 and WEA 24.9712-7)

1. "Never Stop" – 3:31
2. "Heads Will Roll" – 3:29

12" release (Korova KOW 28T and WEA 24-9711-0)

1. "Never Stop (Discotheque)" – 4:46
2. "Heads Will Roll (Summer Version)" – 4:23
3. "The Original Cutter – A Drop in the Ocean" – 3:59

== Chart positions ==
Chart (1983)	Peak position
Irish Singles Chart	8
New Zealand (Recorded Music NZ)	49
UK Singles Chart	15

== Personnel ==
=== Musicians ===
- Ian McCulloch – vocals, guitar
- Will Sergeant – lead guitar
- Les Pattinson – bass
- Pete de Freitas – drums, xylophone, conga

=== Production ===
- Hugh Jones – producer
- Ian Broudie – producer
- David Balfe – mixed by ("Never Stop (Discotheque)")
- The Bunnymen – mixed by ("Never Stop (Discotheque)")

== Sources ==
- "Echo & The Bunnymen at Discogs.com".
- "Villiers Terrace.com The Ultimate Echo and the Bunnymen Discography".
