= The Cutter (song) =

1983 single by Echo & the Bunnymen

- Cover from the 7" release

Single by Echo & the Bunnymen

from the album Porcupine
- B-side: "Way Out and Up We Go" / "Zimbo" (live)
- Released: 14 January 1983
- Recorded: September 1982
- Genre: Rock; post-punk
- Length: 3:53
- Label: Korova
- Songwriters: Ian McCulloch; Will Sergeant; Les Pattinson; Pete de Freitas
- Producer: Kingbird

Echo & the Bunnymen singles chronology
"The Back of Love" (1982)	"The Cutter" (1983)	"Never Stop" (1983)

Alternative cover
- Cover from the 12" release

"The Cutter" is a single released by the English rock band Echo & the Bunnymen on 14 January 1983 by Korova. It is the second single released from their third studio album, Porcupine (1983). The song's title and chorus allude to a line in A Clockwork Orange.

== Release ==
The single was released on the Korova label in the United Kingdom on 14 January 1983 as both a 7" and 12" single. The 7" was available as a limited edition which was packaged with a cassette containing tracks from their August 1979 John Peel session which featured the drum machine that was rumoured to be called "Echo". The extra track on the B-side of the 12" release, "Zimbo", is a live recording from the first WOMAD festival in July 1982 and features the Royal Drummers of Burundi. 12" single available with limited edition free poster

== Critical reception ==
The song was ranked at number 14 among the "Tracks of the Year" for 1983 by NME. In a retrospective review of "The Cutter", AllMusic journalist Tom Maginnis wrote: "Echo and The Bunnymen successfully wed the Eastern influenced psychedelic sounds made famous by the Beatles. The Eastern strings re-enter at strategic points, filling in space between verses and Ian McCulloch's esoteric pleas to 'spare us the cutter!'. The track never loses steam, cruising through each section with power and grace."

== Cover versions ==
The song was covered by the Dutch musician Solex on the 2001 compilation album Matador 2001: Draw Me a Riot, which came free with the April 2001 edition of The Wire magazine. A version of the song, performed by Lagartija Nick, is included on the 2005 Spanish tribute album Play the Game: Un Tributo a Echo & the Bunnymen.

== Formats and track listing ==
All tracks written by Ian McCulloch, Will Sergeant, Les Pattinson and Pete de Freitas except where noted.

UK 7" single (KOW 26)

1. "The Cutter" – 3.53
2. "Way Out and Up We Go" – 3.57

UK 12" single (KOW 26T)

1. "The Cutter" – 3.53
2. "Way Out and Up We Go" – 3.59
3. "Zimbo" (live with the Royal Drummers of Burundi) – 4.52

UK cassette (KOW 26C) Limited edition free with the UK 7" single (KOW 26).

1. "The Cutter"
2. "Villiers Terrace"
3. "Ashes to Ashes" ("Stars Are Stars")
4. "Monkeys"
5. "Read It in Books" (McCulloch, Julian Cope)

Belgium 7" single (24.9919-7)

1. "The Cutter" – 3.52
2. "Way Out and Up We Go" – 4.01

== Chart positions ==
Chart (1983)	Peak position
Australia (Kent Music Report)	67
Irish Singles Chart	10
New Zealand (Recorded Music NZ)	30
UK Singles Chart	8
