= The Back of Love =

1982 single by Echo & the Bunnymen

Single by Echo & the Bunnymen

from the album Porcupine
- B-side: "The Subject"; "Fuel"
- Released: 21 May 1982
- Studio: Trident Studios, London; Square One Studios, Liverpool
- Genre: Rock; post-punk
- Length: 3:13
- Label: Korova; WEA
- Songwriters: Will Sergeant; Ian McCulloch; Les Pattinson; Pete de Freitas
- Producer: Ian Broudie

Echo & the Bunnymen singles chronology
| "A Promise" (1981) | "The Back of Love" (1982) | "The Cutter" (1983) |

"The Back of Love" is a single which was released by the English rock band Echo & the Bunnymen on 21 May 1982. It reached number nineteen on the UK singles chart the same month. It was subsequently added to the band's third studio album Porcupine which was released on 4 February 1983.

The single was produced by Ian Broudie under the pseudonym Kingbird. The A-side of the single was recorded at Trident Studios in London, while the B-side was recorded at Square One Studios in Liverpool. The B-side to both the 7" and 12" versions of the single is "The Subject". The 12" has an extra track on the B-side, "Fuel".

The cover of both the 7" and 12" versions is painting by Henry Scott Tuke called The Promise which was on display at the Walker Art Gallery in Liverpool.

The song was covered by the American rock group Burning Airlines on the 1998 "Always Something There to Remind Me/Back of Love" single, a split release with Braid who performed "Always Something There to Remind Me".

== Track listings ==
All tracks written by Will Sergeant, Ian McCulloch, Les Pattinson and Pete de Freitas.

7" release (Korova KOW 24 and WEA K 19175)

1. "The Back of Love" – 3:13
2. "The Subject" – 5:06

12" release (Korova KOW 24T)

1. "The Back of Love"
2. "The Subject"
3. "Fuel"

== Chart positions ==
| Chart (1982) | Peak position |
|---|---|
| UK Singles Chart | 19 |
| Irish Singles Chart | 24 |

== Personnel ==
- Ian McCulloch – vocals, guitar
- Will Sergeant – lead guitar
- Les Pattinson – bass
- Pete de Freitas – drums
- Ian Broudie – producer
