= A Promise (song) =

1981 single by Echo & the Bunnymen

Single by Echo & the Bunnymen

from the album Heaven Up Here
- B-side: "Broke My Neck" / "Do It Clean"
- Released: 10 July 1981
- Genre: Post-punk
- Length: 3:30 / 3:55
- Label: Korova (UK); WEA (Belgium)
- Songwriters: Will Sergeant, Ian McCulloch, Les Pattinson, Pete de Freitas
- Producers: The Bunnymen, Hugh Jones

Echo & the Bunnymen singles chronology
"'Shine So Hard'" (1981)	"A Promise" (1981)	"Over the Wall" (1981)

Alternative cover
- 12" single cover

"A Promise" is the fourth single by Echo & the Bunnymen and was released on 10 July 1981. It stayed on the UK Singles Chart for four weeks and peaked at number 49. Apart from the Australian-only release of "Over the Wall" later in the year, "A Promise" is the only single to have been released from the band's second album, Heaven Up Here (1981).

The b-side to both the 7" and 12" versions of the single is "Broke My Neck", which was recorded at Tistedal Studios in Tistedal, Norway on 7 June 1981. On the 7" disc, "Broke My Neck" is referred to as a "live" version but it is, in fact, an edit of the longer 12" studio version. The Belgian release of the 7" contains the extra track "Do It Clean", which had previously been the b-side of 1980's "The Puppet" and would again be a b-side on 1984's "The Killing Moon".

== Track listings ==
All tracks written by Will Sergeant, Ian McCulloch, Les Pattinson, and Pete de Freitas.

UK 7" release (Korova KOW 15)

1. "A Promise" – 3:30
2. "Broke My Neck" (live) – 4:36

UK 12" release (Korova KOW 15T)

1. "A Promise" – 3:55
2. "Broke My Neck" (long version) – 7:11

Belgian 7" release (WEA 18.836)

1. "A Promise" – 3:30
2. "Do It Clean" – 2:45
3. "Broke My Neck" (live) – 4:36

== Professional reviews ==
- Allmusic link

== Personnel ==
=== Musicians ===
- Ian McCulloch – vocals, guitar
- Will Sergeant – lead guitar
- Les Pattinson – bass
- Pete de Freitas – drums
- David Balfe – keyboards ("Do It Clean")

=== Production ===
- The Bunnymen – producer
- Hugh Jones – producer
- Bill Drummond – producer ("Do It Clean")
- David Balfe – producer ("Do It Clean")
- Claes Neeb – recorded by ("Broke My Neck")
