= The Teardrop Explodes discography =

Discography

- Studio albums: 3
- Compilation albums: 9
- Singles: 15
- Video albums: 2

This is the discography of English post-punk band the Teardrop Explodes.

== Albums ==
=== Studio albums ===
Title	Album details	Peak chart positions			
Title	Album details	UK	AUS	NZ	US
Kilimanjaro	Released: 8 October 1980; Label: Mercury; Formats: LP, MC	24	92	25	156
Wilder	Released: 27 November 1981; Label: Mercury; Formats: LP, MC	29	98	19	176
Everybody Wants to Shag... The Teardrop Explodes	Released: 2 April 1990; Label: Fontana; Formats: CD, LP, MC	72	—	—	—
"—" denotes releases that did not chart or were not released in that territory.

=== Compilation albums ===
Title	Album details	Peak chart positions
Title	Album details	UK
Piano	Released: 1990; Label: Document; Formats: CD, LP, MC; Collection of rarities	—
Floored Genius: The Best of Julian Cope and The Teardrop Explodes	Released: 3 August 1992; Label: EMI; Formats: CD, LP, MC	22
The Greatest Hit	Released: September 2001; Label: Mercury; Formats: CD	—
The Collection	Released: August 2002; Label: Spectrum; Formats: CD	—
Zoology	Released: August 2004; Label: Head Heritage; Formats: CD; Collection of rarities	—
Peel Sessions Plus	Released: 15 October 2007; Label: Mercury; Formats: CD	—
Cope’s Notes #1	Released: 2 December 2019; Label: Head Heritage; Formats: CD	—
Cold War Psychedelia	Released: 16 July 2021; Label: Head Heritage; Formats: CD, LP; First half consists of demos from 1982	—
Culture Bunker 1978-82	Released: 2 June 2023; Label: Universal Music Recordings; Formats: 6xCD, 7xLP; Singles, B-Sides, Unreleased studio outtakes	—
"—" denotes releases that did not chart.

=== Video albums ===
Title	Album details
Live in Concert	Released: 1983; Label: Master Classics; Formats: VHS, Beta
Copeulation: The Videos of Julian Cope and the Teardrop Explodes	Released: 20 November 1989; Label: Island Visual Arts; Formats: VHS, LaserDisc

== Singles ==
Title	Year	Peak chart positions				Album
Title	Year	UK	UK Indie	IRE	NZ	Album
"Sleeping Gas"	1979	—	—	—	—	Kilimanjaro
"Bouncing Babies"	1979	—	—	—	—	Kilimanjaro
"Treason (It's Just a Story)"	1980	—	3	—	—	Kilimanjaro
"When I Dream"	1980	47	—	—	—	Kilimanjaro
"Reward"	1981	6	—	11	—	Non-album single (Note: "Reward" was later included on the 1981 re-release of Kilimanjaro.)
"Treason (It's Just a Story)" (remix)	1981	18	—	—	—	Kilimanjaro
"Ha-Ha I'm Drowning"	1981	—	—	—	—	Kilimanjaro
"Passionate Friend"	1981	25	—	—	48	Wilder
"Colours Fly Away"	1981	54	—	—	—	Wilder
"Tiny Children"	1982	44	—	—	—	Wilder
"Seven Views of Jerusalem" (Australia-only release)	1982	—	—	—	—	Wilder
"You Disappear from View"/"Suffocate"	1983	41	—	—	—	Non-album single (Note: "You Disappear from View" was later included on Everybody Wants to Shag... The Teardrop Explodes.)
"Reward" (remix)	1985	106	—	—	—	Non-album single
"Serious Danger"	1990	92	—	—	—	Everybody Wants to Shag... The Teardrop Explodes
"Count to Ten and Run for Cover"	1990	—	—	—	—	Everybody Wants to Shag... The Teardrop Explodes
"—" denotes releases that did not chart or were not released in that territory.
