= Better Scream =

Single by Wah! Heat
- B-side: "Hey (Disco) Joe"
- Released: 1979
- Recorded: Liverpool
- Genre: Post-punk
- Length: 8:03
- Label: Inevitable Music
- Songwriter: Pete Wylie

Wah! Heat singles chronology
"Better Scream" (1979)	"Seven Minutes to Midnight" (1980)

"Better Scream" is the debut 7" single released by the first band incarnation of Pete Wylie, Wah! Heat after being a member of the short-lived Crucial Three and the Mystery Girls. It was also Wylie's third serious project (the first being the heavily funded but short-lived Liverpool super group English Opium Eaters with future Lightning Seeds leader Ian Broudie, future Frankie Goes to Hollywood dancer Paul Rutherford on lead vocals, and future Siouxsie and the Banshees drummer Budgie). When the English Opium Eaters collapsed due to musical differences, Wylie then joined local band Crash Course but left taking drummer Rob Jones with him. Wah! Heat was formed in late 1979.

The original band consisted during this time of Pete Wylie on vocals and guitar, Rob Jones on drums and former Those Naughty Lumps' guitarist Pete Younger on bass. By the time the single was recorded, Mick Jones (no relative) had joined on keyboards.

"Better Scream" was first released in late 1979, and in February 1980 was reviewed the same week as Wylie's former colleague Julian Cope released his third single "Treason" with the Teardrop Explodes. "Better Scream" received critical acclaim by the British press and magazines like Sounds and the NME. John Peel also noticed the band, and was so impressed by their 7" debut that he invited them to record their first Peel Session in late spring 1980.

== Track listing ==
1. "Better Scream" (Wylie) - 3:25
2. "Hey (Disco) Joe" (Jones, Wylie, Younger) - 5:00
