= Kilimanjaro (The Teardrop Explodes album) =

Studio album by The Teardrop Explodes
- Released: 10 October 1980
- Recorded: Summer 1979–summer 1980
- Studios: Rockfield Studios, Rockfield, Monmouthshire, Wales
- Genres: Neo-psychedelia; post-punk
- Length: 37:05
- Label: Mercury
- Producers: Bill Drummond and David Balfe (as The Chameleons); Clive Langer; Alan Winstanley; Mike Howlett

The Teardrop Explodes chronology
Kilimanjaro (1980)	Wilder (1981)

Singles from Kilimanjaro
- 1. "Sleeping Gas" Released: 16 February 1979; 2. "Bouncing Babies" Released: 22 June 1979; 3. "Treason (It's Just a Story)" Released: 7 March 1980; 4. "When I Dream" Released: 5 September 1980; 5. "Reward" Released: 23 January 1981; 6. "Treason (It's Just a Story) (Remixed Version)" Released: 24 April 1981; 7. "Ha-Ha I'm Drowning" Released: 28 August 1981

Alternative cover
- The "Mount Kilimanjaro" cover

Professional ratings
Review scores
Source	Rating
AllMusic	4.5/5 stars
The Guardian	5/5 stars
NME	8/10
Q	5/5 stars
Record Collector	4/5 stars
Record Mirror	4/5 stars
Smash Hits	8½/10
Uncut	4/5 stars
The Village Voice	B

Kilimanjaro is the debut album by the neo-psychedelic Liverpool band The Teardrop Explodes, released on 10 October 1980. It contains versions of the band's early singles "Sleeping Gas", "Bouncing Babies", "Treason" and "When I Dream"; reissues of the album also include their biggest hit, "Reward". The album also includes the song "Books", originally a song by Julian Cope's previous band, The Crucial Three; it was also recorded by Echo & the Bunnymen (as "Read It in Books", released on the B-side of their debut single, and featured on some versions of Crocodiles). In 2000, Q magazine placed Kilimanjaro at number 95 in its list of the "100 Greatest British Albums Ever".

The original working title for Kilimanjaro was Everyone Wants to Shag the Teardrop Explodes; this title was later used for the CD release of demos for the band's never-finished third album. When originally released, the album featured a shadowy photograph of the band on the sleeve; when the album was reissued in 1981, the album artwork was changed to a photo of zebras in front of Tanzania's Mount Kilimanjaro, the mountain after which the record was named. Subsequent CD reissues feature either album covers.

In 2000, Cope gave his blessings to re-release Kilimanjaro with a selection of bonus tracks (mainly single B-sides), original artwork, a remastered sound, and full lyrics and essays. A deluxe 3-disc edition followed in 2010, including original singles, B-sides and radio session recordings.

== Track listing ==
All tracks are written by Julian Cope, Gary Dwyer and Michael Finkler, except as noted.

Original 1980 release
No.	Title	Writer(s)	Length
1.	"Ha Ha I'm Drowning"		2:53
2.	"Sleeping Gas"	Cope, Dwyer, Finkler, Paul Simpson	3:45
3.	"Treason"		3:05
4.	"Second Head"		3:10
5.	"Poppies in the Field"		5:01
6.	"Went Crazy"	Cope, Finkler	2:38
7.	"Brave Boys Keep Their Promises"		2:30
8.	"Bouncing Babies"	Cope, Dwyer, Finkler, Simpson	2:28
9.	"Books"	Cope, Ian McCulloch	2:37
10.	"Thief of Baghdad"		3:09
11.	"When I Dream"		5:10
Total length:			37:05

The original release did not include "Reward", which was added to later pressings after it became a hit single early in 1981. The reverse of the LP album sleeve had a running order different from that of the record itself.

The album was reissued with a new sleeve (known as the "Zebra" or "Mountain" sleeve), with "Reward" added as an extra track following "Second Head" in the running order. This reissue of the album was also remixed – most noticeably on "Went Crazy" and a longer version of "When I Dream".

U.S. version (Mercury SRM-1-4016)
No.	Title	Writer(s)	Length
1.	"Ha Ha I'm Drowning"		2:53
2.	"Treason"		3:05
3.	"Suffocate"	Cope, David Balfe	3:43
4.	"Reward"	Cope, Alan Gill	2:52
5.	"When I Dream"		5:09
6.	"Went Crazy"	Cope, Finkler	2:32
7.	"Brave Boys Keep Their Promises"		2:30
8.	"Sleeping Gas"	Cope, Dwyer, Finkler, Simpson	3:44
9.	"Books"	Cope, McCulloch	2:36
10.	"Thief of Baghdad"		3:09
11.	"Poppies in the Field"		5:04
Total length:			37:17

This version of the album dropped "Second Head" and "Bouncing Babies" from the UK track line-up, but included "Suffocate" and "Reward" – the latter featuring a 12-second instrumental intro not included on the various UK releases of the song. This U.S. version of the album was reissued in the early 1990s on CD, LP and cassette by the New Jersey–based independent label Skyclad (LUCKY 7), but featuring the "Zebra" sleeve.

2000 CD reissue
No.	Title	Writer(s)	Length
1.	"Ha Ha I'm Drowning"		2:54
2.	"Sleeping Gas"	Cope, Dwyer, Finkler, Simpson	3:46
3.	"Treason"		2:57
4.	"Second Head"		3:11
5.	"Poppies in the Field"		5:05
6.	"Went Crazy"	Cope, Finkler	2:40
7.	"Brave Boys Keep Their Promises"		2:31
8.	"Bouncing Babies"	Cope, Dwyer, Finkler, Simpson	2:27
9.	"Books"	Cope, McCulloch	2:36
10.	"Thief of Baghdad"		3:09
11.	"When I Dream" (longer version)		7:13
12.	"Reward"	Cope, Gill	2:44
13.	"Kilimanjaro"	Cope, Dwyer, Balfe, Gill	4:31
14.	"Strange House in the Snow"	Cope, Balfe	4:44
15.	"Use Me"	Cope	5:49
16.	"Traison (C'est Juste Une Histoire)"		2:54
17.	"Sleeping Gas" (live at Club Zoo, 22 December 1981)	Cope, Dwyer, Finkler, Simpson	9:27
Total length:			67:06

=== 2010 deluxe edition reissue ===
On 12 July 2010, the album was re-released as a remastered 3-disc deluxe edition with the "zebra" cover artwork.

Disc 1: Kilimanjaro
No.	Title	Writer(s)	Length
1.	"Ha Ha I'm Drowning"		2:55
2.	"Sleeping Gas"	Cope, Dwyer, Finkler, Simpson	3:45
3.	"Treason"		2:56
4.	"Second Head"		3:10
5.	"Poppies in the Field"		5:05
6.	"Went Crazy"	Cope, Finkler	2:41
7.	"Brave Boys Keep Their Promises"		2:40
8.	"Bouncing Babies"	Cope, Dwyer, Finkler, Simpson	2:30
9.	"Books"	Cope, McCulloch	2:36
10.	"Thief of Baghdad"		3:09
11.	"When I Dream" (longer version)		7:10
Total length:			38:33

Disc 2: Bates Motel
No.	Title	Writer(s)	Length
1.	"Reward"	Cope, Gill	2:44
2.	"Sleeping Gas" (single version)	Cope, Dwyer, Finkler, Simpson	4:38
3.	"Camera Camera"	Cope, Dwyer, Finkler, Simpson	2:38
4.	"Kirkby Workers Dream Fades"	Cope, Dwyer, Finkler, Simpson	1:53 (Note: This song is mis-titled "Kirby Workers Dream Fades" on the deluxe edition.)
5.	"Bouncing Babies" (single version)	Cope, Dwyer, Finkler, Simpson	2:45
6.	"All I Am Is Loving You"		4:26
7.	"Treason" (Zoo single version)		3:05
8.	"Read It in Books"	Cope, McCulloch	2:16
9.	"Kilimanjaro"	Cope, Dwyer, Balfe, Gill	4:31
10.	"Strange House in the Snow"	Cope, Balfe	4:44
11.	"Use Me"	Cope	5:49
12.	"Traison (C'est Juste Une Histoire)"		2:54
13.	"Sleeping Gas" (live at Club Zoo, 22 December 1981)	Cope, Dwyer, Finkler, Simpson	9:27
Total length:			51:50

Disc 3: BBC Sessions
No.	Title	Writer(s)	Length
1.	"Brave Boys Keep Their Promises" (Peel Session, 15 October 1979)		2:22
2.	"Ha Ha I'm Drowning" (Peel Session, 15 October 1979)		3:42
3.	"Went Crazy" (Peel Session, 15 October 1979)	Cope, Finkler	2:52
4.	"Chance" (Peel Session, 15 October 1979)	Cope, Dwyer	3:02
5.	"Thief of Baghdad" (Peel Session, 24 April 1980)		3:12
6.	"When I Dream" (Peel Session, 24 April 1980)		4:20
7.	"Poppies in the Field" (Peel Session, 24 April 1980)		4:45
8.	"Reward" (Mike Read Session, 27 October 1980)	Cope, Gill	3:01
9.	"Suffocate" (Mike Read Session, 27 October 1980)	Cope, Balfe	3:54
10.	"For Years" (Mike Read Session, 27 October 1980)		4:15
11.	"The Great Dominions" (Mike Read Session, 27 October 1980)	Cope	3:40
Total length:			37:21

- Disc 2: tracks 1 & 10 from "Reward" single; tracks 2 to 4 from original "Sleeping Gas" single; tracks 5 & 6 from original "Bouncing Babies" single; tracks 7 & 8 from original "Treason" single"; track 9 was the B-side to "When I Dream" single; tracks 11 & 12 from "Treason" single reissue
- Disc 3: tracks 1 to 4 recorded 2 October 1979; tracks 5 to 7 recorded 16 April 1980; tracks 8 to 11 recorded 16 October 1980

The contents of disc 1 and most of disc 2 were previously released on other issues of Kilimanjaro: the remainder of disc 2 is taken from the compilation Piano. Disc 3 is mostly taken from The Peel Sessions release, "Suffocate" is a bonus track on the 2000 release of the band's second album Wilder and the other tracks were previously unissued. However, not all tracks from the parent releases are found on this release.

Julian Cope, despite authorising the release of the deluxe edition, later wrote on his website that he felt that the release had a low sound quality and forced fans to buy a vast majority of tracks which they already had while only offering a few newly released rare ones.

== Personnel ==
=== Original album release ===
The Teardrop Explodes

- Julian Cope – vocals, bass guitar
- David Balfe – piano, organ, synthesizer
- Gary Dwyer – drums
- Alan Gill – guitar on "Reward" (second edition of album only), "Poppies in the Field", "Ha Ha I'm Drowning", "Books" and "When I Dream"

with:

- Michael Finkler – guitar on "Second Head", "Brave Boys Keep Their Promises", "Bouncing Babies", "Ha Ha I'm Drowning", "Sleeping Gas", "Treason", "Went Crazy" and "Thief of Baghdad"
- Hurricane Smith, Ray Martinez – trumpets on "Ha Ha I'm Drowning", "Sleeping Gas" and "Went Crazy"

Technical

- Hugh Jones – engineer
- Brian Griffin – photography

=== 2010 deluxe edition release ===
Disc 1 (Kilimanjaro)

(same credits as for the original 1980 album release)

Disc 2 (Bates Motel)

- Julian Cope – vocals, bass guitar, violin on "Strange House in the Snow"
- Gary Dwyer – drums
- Paul Simpson – organ on "Sleeping Gas" (single version), "Camera Camera" and "Kirkby Workers Dream Fades"
- Michael Finkler – guitar on "Sleeping Gas" (single version), "Camera Camera", "Kirkby Workers Dream Fades", "Bouncing Babies" (single version), "All I Am Is Loving You", "Treason" (Zoo single version), "Read It in Books", "Use Me" and "Traison (C'est Juste Une Histoire)"
- David Balfe – keyboards on "Reward", "Treason" (Zoo single version), "Read It in Books", "Kilimanjaro", "Reward", "Strange House in the Snow", "Use Me", "Traison (C'est Juste Une Histoire" and "Sleeping Gas" (live version)
- Alan Gill – guitar on "Reward", "Kilimanjaro" and "Strange House in the Snow"
- Troy Tate – guitar on "Sleeping Gas" (live version) (uncredited)
- Ronnie François – bass guitar on "Sleeping Gas" (live version) (uncredited)

Disc 3 (BBC Sessions)

- Julian Cope – vocals, bass guitar
- Gary Dwyer – drums
- Michael Finkler – guitar on "Brave Boys Keep Their Promises", Ha Ha I'm Drowning", "Went Crazy", "Chance", "The Thief of Baghdad", "When I Dream" and "Poppies in the Field"
- Ged Quinn – keyboards on "Brave Boys Keep Their Promises", Ha Ha I'm Drowning", "Went Crazy" and "Chance"
- David Balfe – keyboards on "The Thief of Baghdad", "When I Dream" and "Poppies in the Field"
- "The Emotional Jungle" – guitar on "Reward", "Suffocate", "For Years" and "The Great Dominions"
- "The Evil Wasp" – keyboards on "Reward", "Suffocate", "For Years" and "The Great Dominions"
- "The Legendary" Eric Batchelor – trumpet

== Charts ==
Chart (1980–81)	Peak position
Australian Albums (Kent Music Report)	92
New Zealand Albums (RMNZ)	25
UK Albums (Official Charts)	24
US Billboard 200	156

== Certifications ==
Region	Certification	Certified units/sales
United Kingdom (BPI)	Silver	60,000^{^}
^{^} Shipments figures based on certification alone.
