= Twilight of Idols (Fashion album) =

Studio album by Fashion
- Released: 1984
- Recorded: Odyssey Studios, London; Marcus studios, London; Trigger Studio, Paris
- Genres: New wave; synth-pop
- Length: 42:54
- Label: De Stijl Records/CBS
- Producer: Zeus B. Held

Fashion chronology
Fabrique (1982)	Twilight of Idols (1984)	Stairway to Nowhere (2009)

Professional ratings
Review scores
Source	Rating
AllMusic	link

Twilight of Idols is the third and final album by English new wave band Fashion released in 1984. Produced by Zeus B. Held and their only to feature singer/songwriter Alan Darby, after the departure of Dave Harris.

The track "Eye Talk" was released as a UK single, reaching No. 69 in February 1984 having been preceded in the charts by Fashion's earlier single releases: "Streetplayer (Mechanik)" and "Love Shadow".

The album was reissued on CD for the first time in March 2009 by Cherry Red Records, featuring 4 bonus tracks.

== Track listing ==
1. "Eye Talk" (Alan Thomas Darby) – 3:24
2. "Dreaming" (Darby) – 4:12
3. "Hit Girl" (Dik Davies, John Mulligan) – 3:49
4. "Trader" (Darby, A. Robertson) – 4:29
5. "You in the Night" (Darby, Francis McPadden) – 4:49
6. "Delirious" (Marlon Recchi) – 3:36
7. "Hurricane" (Darby) – 4:47
8. "Too Much Too Soon" (Darby) – 3:41
9. "Slow Down" (Darby) – 4:12
10. "Twilight of Idols" (Darby) – 5:55
11. "Eye Talk (Mutant Version)"* (Darby) – 9:17
12. "Dreaming (Extended Version)"* (Darby) – 6:50
13. "White Line Flyer (Extended Version)"* (Darby) – 3:20
14. "You in the Night (Extended Version)"* (Darby, McPadden) – 5:22

Tracks marked with an asterisk (*) only appear on the CD reissue.

== Personnel ==
- Alan Darby - vocals, guitar
- Mulligan - synthesizer, vocals
- Marlon Recchi - bass guitar, vocals
- Dik Davis - drums and percussion, vocals
