= John Mulligan =

English new wave bassist and keyboardist

Mulligan
- Also known as: John Mulligan, Mulligán, Muligan
- Born: John Joe Salvatore Martinez Marion Mulligan; 1954 (age 71–72)
- Origin: Birmingham, England
- Genres: Post-punk; new wave; synth-pop; alternative rock
- Occupations: Musician, artist, designer
- Instruments: Bass guitar, Synthesizer
- Years active: 1978 – Present
- Labels: Fàshiön Music, I.R.S., Arista, Epic

John Joe Salvatore Martinez Marion Mulligan (born 1954) is a Birmingham, England-born new wave musician. He is most prominently known as being the founding member, bassist and keyboardist of the band Fashion from 1978 to 1984.

== Biography ==
Mulligan was born in Moseley, Birmingham. He has a Latin and Irish Catholic background.

He is most prominently known as the dreadlocked founding member of the band Fashion, which he formed with Dik Davis on vocals and drums and Luke Skyscraper (Alan James) on vocals and guitar. They toured extensively with The Police, Squeeze, The Stranglers, The Ramones, The B 52's, Patti Smith, and Gang Of Four.

All the way through the various line-ups of Fashion, Mulligan was involved with the band's production, assisting producers Bob Lamb and Zeus B. Held.

Mulligan began to feature on other artists' work, including doing live session work with Visage before branching out in the late 1980s and early 1990s to become a session musician and producer for bands such as Bananarama and Milli Vanilli.

In 1982, he formed the band Tin Tin with Dik Davis, Stephen Duffy, Andy "Stroker" Growcott (of Dexy's Midnight Runners), and Bob Lamb.

He later played with and became a music programmer for Hollywood Beyond, Soul II Soul, Reggae Philharmonic Orchestra, and Kym Mazelle. He also programmed remixes for Alison Moyet and Adamski.

In the 1990s, Mulligan worked with various management and record companies, storyboarding, filming, and editing music videos for Instinctive Records, Dub TV, and Freetown Records.

He later wrote and performed with The League Of Hedonists and Star Chamber Orchestra.

He has retired from music, and now paints large realist oil paintings, and designs 1930s-inspired clothing with his wife Lucy Mulligan-Lei.

== Equipment ==
Synthesizers used in Fashion from 1981 onward:

- Roland Jupiter-8 (primary keyboard)
- Moog Source
- PPG Wave
- Oberheim OB-Xa

== Discography of Fashion ==
- Product Perfect (1979)
- Fabrique (1982)
- Twilight of Idols (1984)
