= Fabrique =

Studio album by Fashion
- Released: 25 June 1982
- Genres: New wave; synth-pop
- Label: Arista
- Producer: Zeus B. Held

Fashion chronology
Product Perfect (1979)	Fabrique (1982)	Twilight of Idols (1984)

Professional ratings
Review scores
Source	Rating
AllMusic	3/5 stars

Fabrique is the second album by the English new wave band Fashion. It was produced by Zeus B. Held. The album included the following UK hit singles: "Streetplayer (Mechanik)" which reached No. 46 in April 1982 and "Love Shadow", which peaked at No. 51 in August of the same year. "Move On" and "Something In Your Picture" were also issued as the first and third singles of the album but failed to chart. The album itself peaked at #10 in the charts, spending 16 weeks on the top 100.

The album was re-released with additional material in 2004 as The Height Of Fashion.

Two songs from the album, "Whitestuff (short cut)" and "You Only Left Your Picture" were used in two Miami Vice episodes, respectively "Evan" from season 1 and "The Prodigal Son" from season 2.

== Track listing ==
All tracks written by David "Dee" Harris except where noted.

1. "Move On"
2. "Love Shadow"
3. "Streetplayer – Mechanik"
4. "Dressed to Kill"
5. "You Only Left Your Picture"
6. "Something in Your Picture" (Dee Harris/Zeus B Held)
7. "It's Alright"
8. "Whitestuff (Short Cut)" (Dee Harris/Zeus B Held)
9. "Do You Wanna Make Love"
10. "Slow Blue"
11. "Mutant Move" *
12. "Love Shadow (Smokey Dialogue)" *
13. "Street Mechanik" *
14. "Do You Wanna Make Love (at – 5:00 am?)" *
15. "You Only Left Your Picture (Reggae Reprise)" *

(Tracks marked with an asterisk (*) are bonus tracks on The Height of Fashion)

'Double Play' cassette (Arista Canada ATC6604 (c)1982) contains all the above plus:

1. "Dressed to Kill Double Dub"
2. "Something in Your Picture (Alternative Playback)"
3. "Whitestuff (The Unfinished)"

== Personnel ==
Fashiøn

- De Harriss – vocals, guitar, Bass guitar, Keyboards
- Mulligan – synthesizer, vocals
- Martin Recchi – bass guitar, vocals
- Dik Davis – drums and percussion, vocals

Additional personnel

- Zeus B. Held – additional keyboards, engineer
- Gina Kikoine – vocals (track 2)
- Pete Willman – bass clarinet (track 2)
- Nick Froome – mixing engineer
- Christian Gence – engineer
- Chris Lester – engineer
- Jean-Pierre Massiera – engineer
- Jean-Marc Meredith – engineer
- Steve Robert – engineer
- Martin Homberg – engineer
- Paddy Eckersley – front photo
- David Bailey – back photo
- David Shortt – design control
- Thomi Wroblewski – front photo tinting
