= Gina X Performance =

German dance-rock/electropop project

- Origin: Cologne, Germany
- Genres: Dance-rock; electropop; synth-pop
- Years active: 1978–1984
- Labels: LTM; EMI Electrola
- Past members: Gina Kikoine; Zeus B. Held; László Czigany; Dierk Hill; Ralph Morgenstern; Jimmy Hömberg; Hinrich Sickenberger

Gina X Performance (commonly abbreviated as GXP) was a German dance-rock/electropop project from Cologne, Germany, consisting of singer and lyricist Gina Kikoine and writer and producer Zeus B. Held, accompanied by various studio and live musicians.

The band released four studio albums in the late 1970s and early 1980s, and were frequently played in North American and European dance clubs at the height of their popularity. Their best-known songs are the singles "No G.D.M." (covered by Erasure as the B-side to their single "Blue Savannah") and "Nice Mover".

== Biography ==
Zeus B. Held had previously been a member of the rock band Birth Control since the early 1970s, before splitting in 1978 to record on his own, and worked on two solo albums before meeting Gina Kikoine the same year. Their collaboration bore their first fruits in 1978 with the release of the single "No G.D.M.", dedicated to the English writer Quentin Crisp, whom Kikoine knew in person. The song was a great success, and allowed them to perform in Vienna in front of a crowd of 14,000 people in a concert at a festival where they shared the stage with Boney M, among others.

GXP then released their first album, Nice Mover, in 1979. This "robotic soul" release combined disco-inspired rhythms with colder and more experimental sounds, thanks to Held's choice of keyboards, such as the Minimoog, the ARP 2600 and the use of vocoder.

The second album, X-Traordinaire, was released in 1980, soon after the single "Strip Tease". X-Traordinaire has a warmer and more conventional sound than its predecessor, although it touched upon deeper issues in tracks like "Nowhere Wolf" or "Ciao Caruso", dedicated to the famous Italian tenor Enrico Caruso (the song included a sample of Caruso himself singing "O Libiamo Ne` Lieti Calici", from La Traviata) and the Andalusian poet Federico García Lorca. This album and associated single "Do It Yourself" were met with a mixed reception from the critics.

Then came a period dedicated to personal projects, during which Gina Kikoine sang with Billy McKenzie on "The Best of You" (before being replaced by Annie Lennox, and subsequently Eddi Reader on the final release of The Associates "Perhaps" album) and Zeus B. Held published his third solo album and collaborated with the English funk group Fashion (for whom Gina Kikoine would later contribute vocals on "Love Shadow"). In 1981, the band released Voyeur, the third and last album by GXP, a lot more radical, minimalist and provocative than the previous albums, both musically and visually. No single would be released for this album, but GXP went on to perform a series of promotional concerts in various European cities.

Three years later, Gina Kikoine and Zeus B. Held reunited one last time to work on Yinglish, simply credited to Gina X this time. Accompanied by J. J. Jeczalik on the Fairlight CMI, the band adopted a more accessible sound and image than on any of the preceding Gina X Performance releases. The associated singles were covers of The Beatles's Drive My Car, and Brigitte Bardot's Harley-Davidson.

Following the poor commercial results of their last album, Gina Kikoine went back to the Cologne art scene as a writer and event organiser. Held stuck to music production as well as his solo career. His productions include musicians and bands like John Foxx, Dead or Alive, Nina Hagen, Win, Die Krupps, Spear of Destiny, Transvision Vamp and Udo Lindenberg.

Various tracks from "Nice Mover" have since appeared on genre compilations such as Andrew Weatherall's The 9 O'Clock Drop and DJ Hell's Music From Hell. "Vendor's Box", a track from the album X-Traordinaire is included in a 2020 80's synth pop compilation entitled "Music, Musik, Musique".

== Discography ==
=== Albums ===
Title	Details
Nice Mover	Released: 1979; Label: Crystal Records/Electrola; Formats: 7″ record
X-traordinaire	Released: 1980; Label: EMI Electrola; Formats: 7″ record
Voyeur	Released: 1981; Label: EMI Electrola; Formats: 7″ record
Yinglish	Released: 1984; Label: Statik Records; Formats: 7″ record
