= Wilder (album) =

Studio album by the Teardrop Explodes
- Released: 23 November 1981
- Recorded: 1981
- Genre: Post-punk; art rock; psychedelia; alternative rock
- Length: 39:52
- Label: Mercury, Fontana
- Producer: Clive Langer (with Alan Winstanley on "Passionate Friend")

The Teardrop Explodes chronology
Kilimanjaro (1980)	Wilder (1981)	Everybody Wants to Shag... The Teardrop Explodes (1990)

Singles from Wilder
- 1. "Passionate Friend" Released: 21 August 1981; 2. "Colours Fly Away" Released: 13 November 1981; 3. "Tiny Children" Released: 11 June 1982; 4. "Seven Views of Jerusalem" / "Falling Down Around Me" Released: July 1982 (Australia only)

Professional ratings
Review scores
Source	Rating
AllMusic	3/5 stars
God Is in the TV	4/5 stars
NME	9/10
Q	4/5 stars
Record Collector	3/5 stars
Record Mirror	5/5 stars
Smash Hits	8½/10
Uncut	8/10

Wilder is the second album by neo-psychedelic Liverpool band the Teardrop Explodes, and the final completed album released by the group.

In 2000 former Teardrop Explodes leader Julian Cope gave his blessings to re-release Wilder with a selection of bonus tracks, mainly single b-sides, plus original artwork, a remastered sound, and full lyrics and essays.

== Background ==
Wilder was recorded following a turbulent period in the band's career involving the success of their debut album Kilimanjaro, several line-up changes and a fraught, drug-fuelled American tour. For Wilder, the group's leader and principal songwriter Julian Cope developed his songwriting by using many experimental approaches.

Wilder featured a far greater use of synthesizer arrangements and loop experiments than Kilimanjaro, predominantly at the instigation of keyboard player David Balfe (who acted as Cope's principal creative collaborator in the studio). By now Cope had mostly abandoned his role as the group's bass player (with many tracks on the record featuring session bassist James Eller) and shared some of the guitarist role with Troy Tate, as well as dabbling in piano and organ. Some tracks featured a full group sound as featured on Kilimanjaro (most notably "Passionate Friend", the only single release and album track to feature the band's ill-fated US touring members Alfie Agius and Jeff Hammer) but in general the album broke away from the West Coast/beat group sound of the debut as well as having a noticeably more downbeat and troubled atmosphere. Some Wilder tracks featured little or no guitar, avoided the standard drumkit or set Cope's voice against solo synthesizer only.

While these approaches resulted in an album of diverse styles and revealed that the Teardrop Explodes was a far more flexible band than previous releases had suggested, it also lost the group many of the fans of the more straightforward Kilimanjaro. Although the single "Passionate Friend" charted reasonably, the album failed commercially. The band released one further EP, "You Disappear From View", which was added to the 2000 reissue of Wilder (following a previous release on Everybody Wants To Shag ... The Teardrop Explodes, the band's posthumous release of post-Wilder demos and late tracks).

== Track listing ==
=== Original track listing (1981) ===
All tracks are written by Julian Cope.

Side one
No.	Title	Length
1.	"Bent Out of Shape"	3:27
2.	"Colours Fly Away"	2:54
3.	"Seven Views of Jerusalem"	3:47
4.	"Pure Joy"	1:42
5.	"Falling Down Around Me"	3:08
6.	"The Culture Bunker"	5:29

Side two
No.	Title	Length
7.	"Passionate Friend"	3:29
8.	"Tiny Children"	3:50
9.	"Like Leila Khaled Said"	3:48
10.	"...And the Fighting Takes Over"	3:53
11.	"The Great Dominions"	4:26

=== CD Re-issue bonus tracks (2000) ===
All tracks are written by Julian Cope; except where indicated.

Extra Tracks from the American Mini Album Buff Manilla
No.	Title	Writer(s)	Length
12.	"Window Shopping for a New Crown of Thorns"		3:48
13.	"East of the Equator"		6:16
14.	"Rachael Built a Steamboat"	Cope (Lyric), David Balfe (Music)	4:15
15.	"You Disappear from View"		2:59
16.	"Suffocate"	Cope, Balfe	3:43
17.	"Ouch Monkeys"	Cope, Balfe	5:15
18.	"Soft Enough for You"	Cope, Balfe	3:55
19.	"The In-Psychlopedia"	Cope, Balfe, Gary Dwyer	4:04

=== CD Re-issue bonus disc (2013) ===
All tracks are written by Julian Cope; except where indicated.

Bonus tracks
No.	Title	Writer(s)	Length
1.	"Christ Vs Warhol"		3:53
2.	"Rachael Built a Steamboat"	Cope (Lyric), David Balfe (Music)	4:15
3.	"Suffocate"	Cope, Balfe	3:43
4.	"Window Shopping for a New Crown of Thorns"		3:48
5.	"Ouch Monkeys"	Cope, Balfe	5:15
6.	"East of the Equator"		6:16
7.	"Sleeping Gas" (Live at Club Zoo)	Cope, Gary Dwyer, Michael Finkler, Paul Simpson	9:24
8.	"The In-Psychlopedia"	Cope, Balfe, Dwyer	4:04
9.	"You Disappear from View"		2:59
10.	"Soft Enough for You"	Cope, Balfe	3:55

BBC Sessions
No.	Title	Writer(s)	Length
11.	"Pure Joy" (BBC Session, Peel Plus, 1981)		1:50
12.	"Like Leila Khaled Said" (BBC Session, Peel Plus, 1981)		2:59
13.	"I'm Not the Loving Kind" (BBC Session, Richard Skinner, 16 May 1981)	John Cale	2:49
14.	"The Culture Bunker" (BBC Session, Peel Plus, 1981)		3:21
15.	"And the Fighting Takes Over" (BBC Session, Richard Skinner, 17 August 1981)		4:29
16.	"Better Scream" / "Make That Move" (BBC Session, Richard Skinner, 17 August 1981)	Wylie, Spencer, Smith, Shelby	3:49
17.	"Bent Out of Shape" (BBC Session, Richard Skinner, 17 August 1981)		2:56
18.	"Screaming Secrets" (BBC Session, Richard Skinner, 17 August 1981)		4:18

== Personnel ==
The Teardrop Explodes

- Julian Cope - vocals, guitars, bass guitar, piano, organ
- Troy Tate - guitars
- David Balfe - keyboards, synthesizers, loops (except on "Passionate Friend")
- Gary Dwyer - drums

with:

- Alfie Agius - bass guitar on "Passionate Friend"
- Jeff Hammer - keyboards on "Passionate Friend"
- James Eller - bass guitar
- Luke Tunney, Ted Emmett - trumpets
- Clive Langer - additional guitar
- Garrish Mashindi - backing vocals on "Like Leila Khaled Said"

Technical

- Colin Fairley - engineer
- Martin Atkins - artwork
- Chalkie Davies - photography

== Charts ==
Chart (1981–82)	Peak position
Australian Albums (Kent Music Report)	98
New Zealand Albums (RMNZ)	19
UK Albums (OCC)	29
US Billboard 200	176

== Certifications ==
Certifications for Wilder
Region	Certification	Certified units/sales
United Kingdom (BPI)	Silver	60,000^{^}
^{^} Shipments figures based on certification alone.
