= Product Perfect =

Studio album by Fàshiön Music
- Released: 19 July 1979 (UK); 17 September 1979 (USA)
- Recorded: Grosvenor Studios, Birmingham
- Genre: Post-punk; new wave
- Length: 43:41
- Label: IRS
- Producer: Fàshiön Music and Miki Cottrell

Fàshiön Music chronology
| Product Perfect (1979) | Fabrique (1982) |

Singles from Product Perfect
- 1. "The Innocent" Released: 28 September 1979; 2. "Silver Blades" Released: March 1980

Professional ratings
Review scores
| Source | Rating |
|---|---|
| AllMusic | 4/5 stars |
| Christgau's Record Guide | A− |

Product Perfect is the debut album by Fàshiön Music (later known as Fashion), released in 1979. It is their only album to feature guitarist–vocalist Luke James. The album has more of a "punk" sound than its synth-driven successors.

It was re-released on CD in 2008.

== Track listing ==
All tracks written by James/Cottrell/Davis/Mulligan.

=== Original UK and US release ===
Side one

1. "Product Perfect" – 3:51
2. "Die in the West" – 4:12
3. "Red, Green and Gold" – 4:40
4. "Burning Down" – 3:27
5. "Big John/Hanoi Annoys Me/Innocent" – 7:24

Side two

1. "Citinite" – 5:18
2. "Don't Touch Me" – 3:00
3. "Bike Boys" – 5:05
4. "Fashion" – 3:30
5. "Technofascist" – 3:35

=== Release on CD (2008) ===
1. "Product Perfect"
2. "Die in the West"
3. "Red, Green and Gold"
4. "Burning Down"
5. "Big John"
6. "Hanoi Annoys Me"
7. "Innocent"
8. "Citinite"
9. "Don't Touch Me"
10. "Bike Boys"
11. "Fashion"
12. "Technofascist"

This CD release was issued by Luke and mastered from mp3. Two of the tracks from side 2 are alternate versions to those on the LP.

Luke also issued a CD with all the singles and b-sides. Mastering source unknown.

== Personnel ==
Fàshiön Music

- Lûke - vocals, guitar
- Mulligán - bass guitar, synthesizer, vocals
- Dïk - drums and percussion, harp, vocals

Additional personnel

- Miki Cottrell - producer, sound engineer
