= Nah=Poo – The Art of Bluff =

Studio album by Wah!
- Released: 1981
- Genre: Post-punk, new wave
- Length: 38:59
- Label: Eternal

Wah! chronology
| Nah=Poo – The Art of Bluff (1981) | The Maverick Years 1980–81 (1982) |

Professional ratings
Review scores
| Source | Rating |
|---|---|
| AllMusic | 4/5 stars |
| Sounds | 4/5 stars |
| Trouser Press | generally favourable |

Nah=Poo – The Art of Bluff is the debut studio album by Pete Wylie under the name Wah!, released in 1981 by record label Eternal.

== Track listing ==
All tracks composed by Pete Wylie; except where indicated

| No. | Title | Writer(s) | Length |
|---|---|---|---|
| 1. | "The Wind-Up" | | 4:45 |
| 2. | "Otherboys" | | 3:54 |
| 3. | "Why D' You Imitate the Cutout?" | | 3:10 |
| 4. | "Mission Impossible" | | 2:40 |
| 5. | "Somesay" | Wylie, Rob Jones | 5:16 |
| 6. | "The Seven Thousand Names of Wah!" | | 4:45 |
| 7. | "Sleeppp" | | 4:10 |
| 8. | "Seven Minutes to Midnight" | | 4:34 |
| 9. | "The Death of Wah!" | Wylie, Harry Nilsson | 5:45 |

== Reception ==
AllMusic wrote: "Pete Wylie's first album as/with Wah! is his finest work, filled to the brim with passionate post-punk and blitzkrieg funk that holds an impressive level of focused intensity from front to back".
