= The Story of the Blues (song) =

Single by Wah!
- Released: 1982
- Genre: New wave
- Length: 3:54
- Label: Eternal, WEA
- Songwriter: Pete Wylie
- Producer: Mike Hedges

Wah! singles chronology
"Remember" (1982)	"The Story of the Blues" (1982)	"Hope (I Wish You'd Believe Me)" (1983)

"The Story of the Blues" is a song by English band Wah!, released as a single in 1982. It was the third single to be released under the name Wah!, after "Forget the Down!" and "Somesay". Wah! was also known as Wah! Heat, Shambeko! Say Wah!, JF Wah!, The Mighty Wah! and Wah! The Mongrel. "The Story of the Blues" is the band's biggest hit, reaching No. 3 on the UK Singles Chart and No. 5 on the Irish Singles Chart.

== In popular culture ==
The song has been adopted by Chester FC and is played at home matches before the team come on to the pitch.

== Track listing ==
7" single
A. "The Story of the Blues Part One"
B. "The Story of the Blues Part Two (Talkin' Blues)"

12" single
A. "The Story of the Blues Part One and Part Two (Talkin' Blues)"
B. "Seven Minutes to Midnight (Liveish)"
