= Crucial Three =

English rock band

The Crucial Three
- Origin: Liverpool, England
- Genres: Punk rock
- Years active: 1977
- Past members: Julian Cope; Ian McCulloch; Pete Wylie; Stephen Spence

The Crucial Three were a short-lived band that existed for approximately six weeks in early 1977. They are nevertheless notable on account of the individual success of all three founding members: Julian Cope formed the Teardrop Explodes and has enjoyed a long and successful solo career as an author, photographer and singer, Ian McCulloch formed the very successful Echo & the Bunnymen, while guitarist Pete Wylie formed Wah! Heat (and various subsequent incarnations of Wah!) and enjoyed major chart success with "The Story of the Blues". In those early days, McCulloch sang, Cope played bass, and Wylie played guitar. A drummer, Stephen Spence, also joined at some point in their brief life.

== The band ==
The band formed in May 1977 and split in June 1977.

According to Cope, the three friends first talked about forming a band on McCulloch's 18th birthday, 5 May 1977, during the Clash's White Riot tour date at Eric's; "By the end of the evening, we were a group. It was all Wylie's trip. He suggested Arthur Hostile & the Crucial Three. Duke [McCulloch] said, 'Sod the bloody Arthur Hostile bit off, it's crap.' So we were the Crucial Three. Wylie went on about how legendary we would be, and Duke and I went along with him, as part of the in-joke."

Although they wrote and rehearsed a number of songs (Wylie claims they had four songs), including "Salomine Shuffle" (which was performed by Wylie in an abbreviated form at The Zanzibar in Liverpool in September 2007) and "Bloody Sure You're on Dope", the band did not last long enough to record anything. They rehearsed in a garage with drummer Steve Spence and split up after a month. According to McCulloch, the band were "...just mates - we never did anything. We wrote one crap song."

== After the band ==
Some of the band's songs have seen the light of day posthumously, most notably the Cope/McCulloch collaboration "Books", which appeared on both the Teardrop Explodes' and Echo & the Bunnymen's respective first albums (the Bunnymen version is titled "Read It in Books" and only appeared on the US release). "Robert Mitchum", another Cope/McCulloch collaboration, appeared on Cope's 1990 album Skellington. The song "Spacehopper" from Cope's solo album Saint Julian was also written during his time in the band, allegedly with some help from McCulloch.

After the Crucial Three, Julian Cope and Pete Wylie formed the Nova Mob, a conceptual band named after a gang mentioned in William Burroughs' novel Nova Express. Recruiting punk friend Pete Griffiths and future Siouxsie and the Banshees drummer Budgie, the Nova Mob were goaded into headlining at Liverpool's top punk club, Eric's. The show was a disaster according to observers and Budgie left to join Big in Japan, at which point the band split up. Julian Cope briefly formed an experimental group called The Hungry Types, and then formed Uh? with Ian McCulloch and McCulloch's school friend Dave Pickett. McCulloch left after the band's first and only gig. Cope and McCulloch formed their last band A Shallow Madness in early 1978, along with organist Paul Simpson and Dave Pickett, now on drums. A rehearsal recording of "Books" as performed by A Shallow Madness appears on the 2004 the Teardrop Explodes rarities collection Zoology.

A Shallow Madness featured the original Teardrop Explodes line-up of Julian Cope, Paul Simpson, Dave Pickett and Mick Finkler, plus Ian McCulloch. The latter's non-attendance at rehearsals led to Cope taking over vocals and thus the Teardrop Explodes was born. The Teardrop Explodes's 1981 album, Wilder, features the song "The Culture Bunker", which references Cope's former band with the lines "...waiting for the Crucial Three...wondering what went wrong."

The well publicized animosity between Cope and McCulloch finally reached a boiling point when Cope fired McCulloch's friend Mick Finkler from the Teardrop Explodes. Further animosity was stoked when "Passionate Friend" by Teardrop Explodes was released, a reference to Julian Cope's former girlfriend, Ian McCulloch's sister.

Drummer Steve Spence pursued a career in advertising, and now works as a Creative Director in London.

== References in popular culture ==
Pavement dedicated a song to the Crucial Three in their live performance from Brixton Academy, London on 14 December 1992, featured on Slanted and Enchanted: Luxe & Reduxe. The dedication is at the end of track 14 - "Home", on the album, but it sounds as though the dedication is in reference to the next song, "Perfume-V".

The Ed Ball project the Times mentioned the Crucial Three's name in the lyrics of A Girl Called Mersey, a tribute to the Liverpool's scene, co-written with his guitarist Richard Green.

The memory of the Crucial Three was revived in 2004 by BBC Radio 2 DJ Mark Radcliffe whose show featured a nightly quiz of the same name, until it ended on 5 April 2007. The quiz was introduced on alternate evenings with recorded announcements by McCulloch and Cope.

The title of Dag Nasty's song "Crucial Three" off of 1987's Wig Out at Denko's is a reference to the band of the same name, though the lyrics focus entirely Cortner's personal relationship struggles in adolescence.
