= Seven Minutes to Midnight (song) =

- Wah!/Goodbye and Ta! to the Enigmatic Reg.

Single by Wah! Heat
- B-side: "Don't Step on the Cracks"
- Released: September 1980
- Recorded: Liverpool
- Genre: Post-punk
- Length: 6:52
- Label: Inevitable
- Songwriters: Wah!, Wylie, Carl Washington and Jonie (plus King Bluff)

Wah! Heat singles chronology
"Better Scream" (1980)	"Seven Minutes to Midnight" (1980)	"Forget the Down" (1981)

"Seven Minutes to Midnight" was the second and final single released by Pete Wylie's Wah! Heat incarnation. The band had made major line-up changes and bass guitar player Pete Younger was replaced by Colm Redmond, then Carl Washington who became Wylie's right hand. The recording included keyboard player King Bluff for the first time. It was during this incarnation that they recorded their only Peel Session on 19 May 1980. The release of the single also marked the departure of Colm Redmond (who joined Faction for a short while and then joined as a full-time member the post-punk band Pink Military) and the transformation of Wylie's first outfit into the better known four piece Wah!.

The track's title is a reference to the Bulletin of the Atomic Scientists and their iconic Doomsday Clock. In 1980, in an atmosphere of increasing nuclear paranoia and failing détente over Soviet involvement in Afghanistan, the Bulletin moved the clock forwards two minutes, to the eponymous seven minutes to midnight.

== Track listing ==
1. "Seven Minutes to Midnight...To Be Continued" (Wah! Heat) – 3:43
2. "Don't Step on the Cracks" (Wah! Heat) – 3:09
