= Treason (It's Just a Story) =

1980 song by The Teardrop Explodes

Single by The Teardrop Explodes

from the album Kilimanjaro
- A-side: "Treason (It's Just a Story)"
- B-side: "Read It in Books"
- Written: Cope, Dwyer, Finkler
- Released: February 1980
- Recorded: January 1980
- Studio: T.W. Studios
- Length: 3:05
- Label: Zoo Records
- Producers: Clive Langer & Alan Winstanley

The Teardrop Explodes singles chronology
"Bouncing Babies" (1979)	"Treason (It's Just a Story)" (1980)	"When I Dream" (1980)

"Treason (It's Just a Story)" (remix)

Single by The Teardrop Explodes
- A-side: "Treason (It's Just a Story)"
- B-side: "Use Me"
- Written: Cope, Dwyer, Finkler
- Released: May 1981
- Length: 2:57
- Label: Mercury Records
- Producers: Clive Langer & Alan Winstanley

The Teardrop Explodes singles chronology
"Reward" (1979)	"Treason (It's Just a Story)" (remix) (1981)	"Passionate Friend" (1981)

"Treason (It's Just a Story)" is a song recorded by Liverpool band the Teardrop Explodes. The track was originally released as a single in early 1980 and then included on the group's debut album Kilimanjaro later the same year.

The original version of the song failed to become a hit, but was later re-mixed by Hugh Jones and re-released as the follow-up to the group's breakthrough hit Reward in 1981. This version reached no.18 in the UK Singles charts in May of the same year. The new version was also included on the re-issue of the Kilimanjaro album, itself more commercially successful than the original album release. On both album releases the song is listed under the title of "Treason".

== B-side ==
The B-side of the original 1980 7" release was "Read It in Books", the Teardrop Explodes' own version of a song originally co-written by Julian Cope and Ian McCulloch, previously recorded and released by McCulloch's band Echo & the Bunnymen in 1979 as the B-side to their debut single "The Pictures on My Wall". The Teardrops' version was also included on the Kilimanjaro album, re-titled "Books".

The B-side of the remixed single version of "Treason" was a new track, entitled "Use Me", written by Julian Cope alone.

== Other versions ==
- A French language version of the track entitled "Traison (C’est juste une histoire)" was released as a bonus track on the 12" release of the re-mixed single in 1981. This version was later included on the deluxe edition of Kilimanjaro released in 2010.
- A live version of Treason performed at Club Zoo, Liverpool on 25 November 1981 was included on the group's comprehensive 2023 compilation Culture Bunker 1978-82. This compilation also features both single versions and the French version of the song, as well as the two B-sides "Read It In Books" and "Use Me".
- A cover version of "Treason" was recorded and released by Nottingham indie pop band Fat Tulips in 1991 as part of their "The Tulip Explodes!" EP, which also included cover versions of Teardrop Explodes songs "Passionate Friend" and "Reward".
