= Fashion (band) =

British new wave band

- Also known as: Fashion Music (stylised as "Fàshiön Music"; 1978–1980); Fashion (stylised as "Fashiøn"; 1980–1984, 2009)
- Origin: Birmingham, England
- Genres: New wave; post-punk; synth-pop
- Years active: 1978–1984; 2009
- Labels: Fàshiön Music; I.R.S.; Cherry Red
- Past members: Dik Daviss; John Mulligan; Luke Sky; Tony Dial; Ian Moore; De Harriss; Martin Recchi; Al Darby; Troy Tate

Fashion (stylised as Fashiøn) were an English new wave band, primarily active from 1978 to 1984, with a brief revival in 2009. They began as a post-punk band, before developing into a new wave/synth-pop ensemble that placed three singles on the lower reaches of the UK singles chart in 1982–84.

== History ==
Fashion went through several line-up overhauls during its initial existence between 1978 and 1984. John Mulligan (synthesizer, bass) and Dik Davis (drums) were constants, but the band's frontman changed with each of the band's three albums.

=== Post-punk years: Fàshiön Music ===
Fashion was formed originally as Fàshiön Music, in Birmingham, England, in 1978, and consisted of John Mulligan (bass, synthesizer), Dik Davis (drums), and Al James (vocals, guitar). James became known as Luke Sky, or simply Luke or Lûke (short for "Luke Skyscraper" – a reference to the Star Wars character Luke Skywalker and the fact that James was tall and thin), while John Mulligan was known simply as Mulligan and Dik Davis simply as Dïk (or "Dik Mamba" on their debut single).

In 1978, they also founded their own Fàshiön Music label; from this point forward, the band was generally (though not completely consistently) identified as Fashion, as distinct from the name of their self-owned label.

Fashion released their first two singles ("Steady Eddie Steady" and "Citinite") as independent issues on the UK in November 1978 and June 1979 respectively. The group was quickly picked up by I.R.S., who put out a third single in the US in September 1979, "The Innocent".

Their sound was varied, playing punk, post-punk and indie repertoire, although Mulligan at that time also had a synthesizer which later characterized the future synth-pop years of the band.

Still signed to I.R.S., in 1979 they recorded and released their first album, Product Perfect. All three members were credited as having written the songs collectively.

Between 1978 and 1980, Fashion played shows with performers such as Toyah Willcox, UB40, Hazel O'Connor and Billy Idol, who later became well known. A then-recently formed Duran Duran opened their shows; they toured the UK with U2, both the UK and US with The Police, and opened for The B-52's on their first British tour.

In March 1980, no longer associated with I.R.S., Fashion released their "Silver Blades" single, again on their own Fàshiön Music label. Later in 1980 they also released one more song, "Let Go", on a Birmingham bands compilation called Bouncing in the Red (EMI).

In June 1980, after a last gig in London with U2, Luke James left the band, and later moved to the United States.

A revised line-up was assembled, containing Dik and Mulligan along with Tony Dial (former singer with the Neon Hearts) on vocals and guitar and Ian Moore on bass. This version of the group recorded sessions for BRMB, and played live gigs as a support act for The Human League, as well as at the Holy City Zoo club in Birmingham. However, Dial and Moore soon left, and the band regrouped once more.

=== New Romantic years: Fashiøn ===
By late 1981, Fashion—which had now been picked up by Arista Records—consisted of De Harriss (vocals, guitar), Martin Recchi (bass), Mulligan (synths) and Dik Daviss (as he now billed himself) on drums. This line-up issued the single "Move On" in November 1981, and though it did not chart, the single still garnered enough attention to allow the band to record the album Fabrique (1982), produced by Zeus B. Held. In addition to "Move On", Fabrique contained the singles "Streetplayer (Mechanik)" and "Love Shadow", both of which were minor UK hits. Harriss (born David Harris) was now the band's frontman and songwriter, writing every song on the album (two were co-writes with Held). Fabrique was later re-issued with additional material as The Height of Fashion (1990, 2001).

Harriss left Fashion before a proposed world tour of Fabrique. Following the loss of their lead singer and songwriter, once again Fashion was dropped by their label.

Harriss was replaced by vocalist Troy Tate and guitarist Al Darby. Although Troy Tate did not record any studio material with Fashion, he performed his own songs with the band live. Songs during Tate's period included "Love Is" and "What You Gonna Do Next." Tate subsequently departed, with Darby left to perform lead vocals. This iteration of the band was signed by Epic Records.

In 1984, Fashion released an album entitled Twilight of Idols, with Darby now acting as lead singer and primary songwriter, penning all but two tracks. Keyboardist Mulligan remained, as did bassist Recchi (who now billed himself as Marlon Recchi, rather than Martin) along with drummer "Dik"/"Dik Mamba"/"Dik Daviss", who now billed himself as Dik Davis. Zeus B. Held was once again the producer. "Eye Talk", released as a single, again put Fashion on the lower end of the UK Singles Chart. However, the band split up after playing live gigs to support the album.

Mulligan went on to record material with Nick Beggs of Kajagoogoo.

After leaving Fashion, De Harriss reverted to using the name "Dave Harris" and, in 1984, recorded an album with Richard Wright, keyboardist of Pink Floyd, as Zee. He later worked as an in-house songwriter and producer at Warner Chapell Music in New York City from 1990 to 2000. He then returned to the UK, where he now works under the name David Harris as a songwriter and producer in Lincoln.

=== Reformation ===
Thirty years after the first Fashion single was issued, original vocalist/guitarist Luke Sky (now based in California) reactivated the Fashion name to issue a new album. Released in February 2009, Stairway to Nowhere featured Luke Sky on vocals and all other instruments, with the exception of Vuk Pavlovic of Nature's Pocket providing drums for three of the tracks. This iteration of Fashion existed for a short time before once again becoming dormant.

== Personnel ==
=== Members ===
- Dik Daviss – drums, percussion, vocals (1978–1984; died 1993)
- John Mulligan – synthesiser, vocals (1978–1984), bass (1978–1980)
- Luke Sky – vocals, guitar (1978–1980, 2009), synthesiser, bass, drums (2009)
- Tony Dial – vocals, guitar (1980–1981)
- Ian Moore – bass (1980–1981)
- De Harriss – vocals, guitar, bass, keyboards (1981–1982)
- Martin Recchi – bass, vocals (1981–1984)
- Al Darby – guitar (1982–1984; died 2023), vocals (1983–1984)
- Troy Tate – vocals (1982–1983)

=== Line-ups ===
1978–1980	1980–1981	1981–1982	1982–1983
Dik Daviss – drums, vocals; John Mulligan – bass, synthesiser, vocals; Luke Sky – vocals, guitar	Dik Daviss – drums, vocals; John Mulligan – synthesiser, vocals; Tony Dial – vocals, guitar; Ian Moore – bass	Dik Daviss – drums, vocals; John Mulligan – synthesiser, vocals; De Harriss – vocals, guitar, bass, keyboards; Martin Recchi – bass, vocals	Dik Daviss – drums, vocals; John Mulligan – synthesiser, vocals; Martin Recchi – bass, vocals; Al Darby – guitar, vocals; Troy Tate – vocals
1983–1984	1984–2009	2009
Dik Daviss – drums, vocals; John Mulligan – synthesiser, vocals; Martin Recchi – bass, vocals; Al Darby – vocals, guitar	Disbanded	Luke Sky – vocals, guitar, synthesiser, bass, drums

== Discography ==
=== Albums ===
==== Studio albums ====
Title	Album details	Peak chart positions
Title	Album details	UK
Product Perfect (as Fàshiön Music)	Released: July 1979; Label: Fàshiön Music; Formats: LP	—
Fabrique	Released: 25 June 1982; Label: Arista; Formats: LP, MC	10
Twilight of Idols	Released: June 1984; Label: Epic; Formats: LP, MC	69
Stairway to Nowhere	Released: 2009; Label: Fàshiön Music; Formats: CD	—
"—" denotes releases that did not chart.

==== Compilation albums ====
Title	Album details
The Height of Fashion	Released: 1990; Label: Arista; Formats: CD
Hits	Released: 2009; Label: Self-released; Formats: CD
MMXIX	Released: 2019; Label: Self-released; Formats: CD; Limited remixes
Fabrique de luxe	Released: 31 January 2021; Label: Gonzo Multimedia; Formats: 4xCD box set
Fàshiön Music	Released: April 2022; Label: Easy Action; Formats: 2xCD, LP

=== Singles ===
Title	Year	Peak chart positions		Album
Title	Year	UK	UK Indie	Album
"Steady Eddie Steady"	1978	—	—	Non-album single
"Citinite"	1979	—	—	Product Perfect
"The Innocent" (US-only release)	1979	—	—	Product Perfect
"Silver Blades"	1980	—	29	Non-album single
"Move On"	1981	—	—	Fabrique
"Streetplayer (Mechanik)"	1982	46	—	Fabrique
"Something in Your Picture"	1982	—	—	Fabrique
"Love Shadow"	1982	51	—	Fabrique
"You Only Left Your Picture" (US-only release)	1982	—	—	Fabrique
"Eye Talk"	1984	69	—	Twilight of Idols
"Dreaming"	1984	101	—	Twilight of Idols
"You in the Night"	1984	94	—	Twilight of Idols
"Sodium Pentathol Negative"	2022	—	—	Non-album single
"—" denotes releases that did not chart or were not released in that territory.
