= Reward (song) =

1981 song by The Teardrop Explodes

Single by The Teardrop Explodes

from the album Kilimanjaro
- B-side: "Strange House in the Snow"
- Released: 23 January 1981
- Genre: New wave, northern soul
- Length: 2:53
- Label: Mercury
- Songwriters: Alan Gill, Julian Cope
- Producers: Clive Langer, Alan Winstanley

The Teardrop Explodes singles chronology
"When I Dream" (1980)	"Reward" (1981)	"Treason (It's Just a Story) (remix)" (1981)

Official audio
- "Reward" on YouTube

"Reward" is a song by English band the Teardrop Explodes. It was released as a single in early 1981 and was the band's biggest hit, peaking at No. 6 in the UK and No. 11 in Ireland. The song was not initially included in the original 1980 UK and European releases of their debut album Kilimanjaro, but was included in the 1980 U.S. release together with the track "Suffocate" (replacing two tracks from the UK release). "Reward" was however added to later pressings of the album from 1981.

The song's creation started with Alan Gill who suggested a bassline for Julian Cope and melody for David Balfe. Julian Cope's opening lyric, "Bless my cotton socks, I'm in the news" reflected his exhilaration at their burgeoning success, while the use of trumpet was influenced by Love's Forever Changes. Cope pursued a northern soul sound for the song's arrangement: he controlled the mixing so the production and recording was done more than once to achieve the frantic pace he wanted. Despite the fact that it was written by Gill, the band's guitarist, the song only features one guitar chord.
