= Pete Wylie =

English singer/songwriter and guitarist

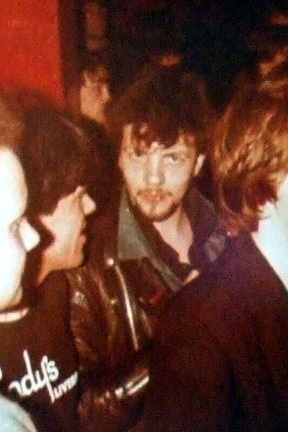
- Wylie in the audience at Brady's Club, Liverpool, early 1980s

Background information
- Born: Peter James Wylie; 22 March 1958 (age 68); Liverpool, Lancashire, England
- Genres: Post-punk; alternative rock; new wave
- Occupations: Musician; singer; songwriter; guitarist
- Instruments: Vocals; guitar
- Years active: 1977–present
- Formerly of: Crucial Three, Mystery Girls, The Spitfire Boys, Crash Course, Wah! Heat, Wah!, The Mighty Wah!, Shambeko! Say Wah!, Big Hard Excellent Fish, Dead Men Walking

Peter James Wylie (born 22 March 1958) is an English singer-songwriter and guitarist, best known as the leader of the band variously known as Wah!, Wah! Heat, Shambeko! Say Wah!, JF Wah!, The Mighty Wah! and Wah! The Mongrel.

== Career ==
=== Early bands ===
Wylie was born on 22 March 1958 in Liverpool. He began his career in 1977 with lead vocalist Ian McCulloch and bassist Julian Cope, with whom he formed the band Crucial Three, which lasted from May to June the same year. Later that year, he performed as a member of the short-lived punk band Mystery Girls, who gave only one performance, supporting Sham 69 at Eric's Club in November 1977, and was composed of Pete Burns and Julian Cope. In December 1977, he joined The Spitfire Boys, who dissolved the same month. Wylie and two of the band, Pete Griffiths and Peter Clarke, formed the same month The Nova Mob, alongside Julian Cope. The band lasted until May 1978. In August, he joined established local band Crash Course (December 1977 – January 1979), on rhythm guitar and backing vocals, after seeing them supporting Big in Japan at the matinee of their farewell show at Eric's Club on 26 August. The revised Crash Course made their first live appearance at Manchester University on 13 October.

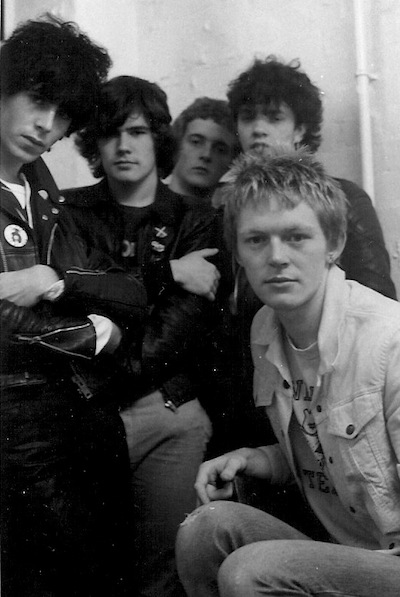
Crash Course (September 1978)

On 22 December 1978, a professional recording of the band performing at Eric's (a gig which included Echo and the Bunnymen as support act) was made for a live EP, to be released on the club's own label, and to follow the Pink Military EP which had also been recorded there. Crash Course disbanded in late January 1979 and the record wasn't pressed (the tape subsequently lost). Also in January 1979, the band had recorded three tracks at Liverpool's MVCU demo studios: "Someone Different" (with which The Glass Torpedoes had a minor hit in mid-1979), "The Tears of a Clown" (the Smokey Robinson song), and "Look Now". Shortly after the band's demise, the three MVCU demo tracks were broadcast, in their unmixed form, on BBC radio's Phil Ross programme. One of the last compositions to be rehearsed by Crash Course was the semi instrumental "Heart Surgery". A version of this later appeared on the Glass Torpedoes EP.

=== Wah! ===
Active from 1979, Wylie and company garnered critical acclaim throughout 1980 for the singles "Better Scream" and "Seven Minutes to Midnight" (both as Wah! Heat), the latter being single of the week in the NME, Sounds and Melody Maker during spring 1980, as well as the 1981 Warner Bros. album Nah = Poo! – The Art of Bluff (as Wah!). Their biggest hit single was "The Story of the Blues", which was released in late 1982; it reached number 3 in the UK Singles Chart.

A follow-up single, "Hope (I Wish You'd Believe Me)" was released in 1983, but found limited success. Next, Wylie released an officially sanctioned "official bootleg" of new and old songs entitled The Maverick Years 1980–81 on his own label. Clad in a cover that alluded to the early 1970s "Trade Mark of Quality" bootlegs, the record appeared as a white label with a blank outer cover and a sheet attached with sleevenotes by music journalist Adam Sweeting. This release did not shore up Wylie's dwindling fortunes and Wah! were subsequently dropped by WEA. In 1984, the Mighty Wah! had a Top 20 hit with the song "Come Back" (as with "The Story of the Blues", the song was chosen by the BBC Radio 1 DJ John Peel as his "single of the year").

The accompanying double album, recorded for Beggars' Banquet, was entitled A Word to the Wise Guy. It was critically acclaimed, but sold poorly and the band were again dropped. By 1986, having ditched his backing ensemble, Wylie had a solo hit with "Sinful!", which peaked at number 13 in the UK, ostensibly produced by Ian Ritchie, but with major input from Zeus B. Held. "Sinful!" became the title track of his 1987 solo album, which included the enigmatically titled "FourElevenFortyFour".

=== 1990–present ===
In 1990, a single called "Imperfect List" was released under the project name of Big Hard Excellent Fish. The spoken-word track is a list of 64 least favourite people and things read by Wylie's then girlfriend and collaborator Josie Jones. The list was compiled by Wylie and the track was recorded by Robin Guthrie of the Cocteau Twins, although Wylie is not credited on the record. The list ranges from "Adolf Hitler" to "Lost Keys".

In 1990, the Justified Ancients of Mu Mu released a limited edition (between 350 and 500 copies) white label version of "It's Grim Up North" featuring Wylie on vocals. This version was a club-only release. The main version was released in October 1991 with Bill Drummond on vocals, making the charts. Creative cracks had begun to appear by 1991, when the collaboration with the Farm on "Sinful! (Scary Jiggin' With Dr Love)" did little for either of the rival camps. In 1991, Wylie toured the UK in support of the Infamy! album with a band featuring Joe McKechnie on drums, Tony Jones on bass and Peter Baker on keyboards. On 11 November of that year, Wylie suffered a near fatal fall when a railing gave way in Upper Parliament Street, Liverpool. He fractured both his spine and his sternum. A long period of rehabilitation ensued.

Wylie began to write songs again and sent demos to David Balfe, formerly of the Teardrop Explodes, founder of Food Records and by that time general manager and Head of A&R of Sony's Columbia label. There were reports that Balfe was so impressed he quickly gave Wylie £750,000 to record the songs, which Wylie did in London and Memphis, delivering Songs of Strength and Heartbreak to a delighted Balfe in 1998.

Wylie quickly formed a new band line up recruiting Mike Joyce and a referral by band The Farm brought bass player Danny Lunt. The band relocated to London to record the new album Songs of Strength and Heartbreak at Abbey Road Studios with producers Mike Hedges and Peter Collins. The truth appears somewhat different as the album – despite being finished up to the point where artwork was finalised and discs had been sent out for review – was rejected by Sony, who chose not to release it. Subsequently, Wylie found himself in artistic limbo as Sony owned the rights to the music he had recorded as Songs of Strength and Heartbreak. He found it difficult to acquire the master tapes, and was without a recording contract. Eventually he was handed the master tapes, and Castle Records released the album.

Wylie's "Heart As Big As Liverpool" (1998) is popular within the city and especially with Liverpool Football Club supporters. It is used in the official Hillsborough tribute video, on a 2001 CD of Merseyside artists (compiled in collaboration with Liverpool Football Club) Mersey Boys and Liverpool Girls and features on Songs of Strength & Heartbreak, a 2000 album credited to The Mighty Wah! The song is also regularly played at Liverpool's home ground, Anfield. 2000 also heralded a compilation album entitled The Handy Wah! Whole. Wylie joined Dead Men Walking, featuring Mike Peters of the Alarm, Kirk Brandon of Spear of Destiny and Glen Matlock of the Sex Pistols. They toured extensively, performing old songs as well as new, including Wylie's "Your Mother Must Be Very Proud".

In 2003, Wylie's voice was featured on the Apollo 440 track "1234" from their album Dude Descending a Staircase. Following an invitation from Alejandro Escovedo, Wylie performed at the 2006 South by Southwest festival in the United States at Austin, Texas. His next project was a twin album release with the working titles Pete Sounds and SLiME, both puns on mid 1960s Beach Boys projects.

Wylie collaborated with Josie Jones, a singer from Merseyside. She was the vocalist on Wah's hit single "Come Back", and on some of Wylie's solo efforts, including "Sinful!", "Diamond Girl", and the spoken word vocals on the Big Hard Excellent Fish release "Imperfect List". Jones died in 2015.

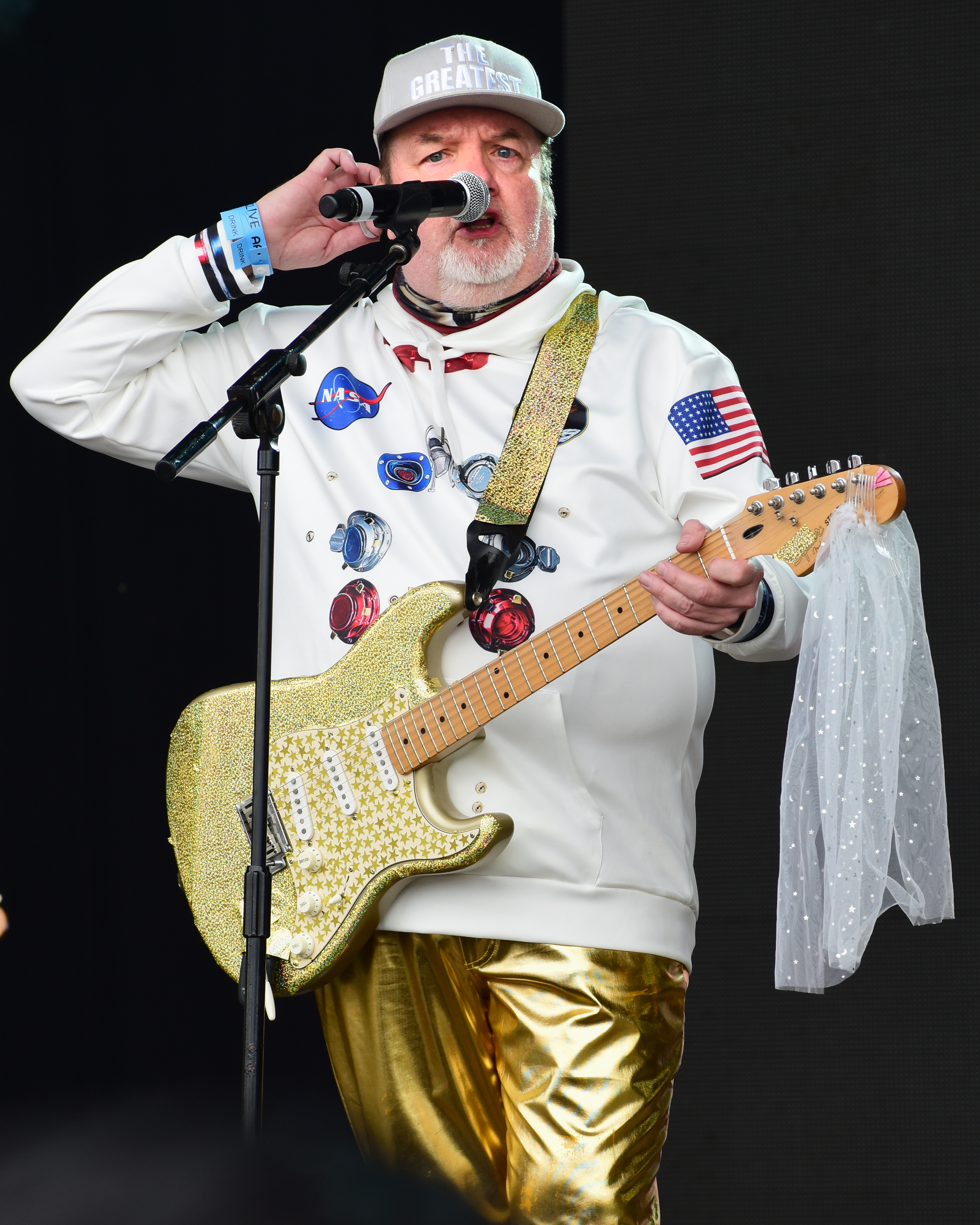
Wylie performing in July 2021 at Let's Rock Liverpool

For several years, Wylie expressed interest in releasing another record, as he had not made any "this century". In the autumn of 2017, Wylie released his first album of the 2010s, entitled Pete Sounds. It was made with donations via PledgeMusic, and then released on his own label.

== Personal life ==
Wylie has an older brother, Phil Wylie, who was the lead vocalist and guitarist for the Liverpool post-punk band Come In Tokio, which recorded three sessions for John Peel's BBC Radio 1 show between 1982 and 1984.

Wylie has a daughter, Mersey, who is a singer and musical director. Her mother is Australian.

== Discography ==
Pete Wylie / Wah! discography
- Studio albums: 6
- Extended plays: 2
- Compilation albums: 2
- Singles: 24

=== Studio albums ===
Year	Information	Chart positions
Year	Information	UK
1981	Nah=Poo – The Art of Bluff (as Wah!): Label: Eternal	33
1982	The Maverick Years 1980–81 (as Wah!): Label: Wonderful World of Wah!	—
1984	A Word to the Wise Guy (as The Mighty Wah!): Label: Beggars Banquet	28
1987	Sinful: Label: Siren Records	—
1991	Infamy! or How I Didn't Get Where I Am Today (as Pete Wylie & Wah! The Mongrel): Label: Siren Records	—
2000	Songs of Strength and Heartbreak (as The Mighty Wah!): Label: Castle Music	—
2017	Pete Sounds! (as Pete Wylie): Label: Pete Sounds + Vision	—
"—" denotes releases that did not chart.

=== Compilation albums ===
- The Way We Wah! (Eternal, 1984)
- The Handy Wah! Whole : Songs from the Repertwah! : The Maverick Years 2000 (Castle Music, 2000)

=== Extended plays ===
- The Peel Sessions (Strange Fruit Records, 1987) (Recorded 22 August 1984)
- Heart as Big as Liverpool (When! Recordings, 2000)

=== Singles ===
Year	Title	Chart positions			
Year	Title	UK	IRL	AUS	US Club Play
1979	"Better Scream" (as Wah! Heat)	—	—	—	—
1980	"Seven Minutes to Midnight....To Be Continued" (as Wah! Heat)	—	—	—	—
1981	"Forget the Down!" (as Wah!)	—	—	—	—
1981	"Somesay" (as Wah!)	—	—	—	—
1982	"Remember" (as Shambeko! Say Wah!)	—	—	—	—
1982	"The Story of the Blues (Part One)" (as Wah!)	3	5	—	—
1983	"Hope (I Wish You'd Believe Me)" (as Wah!)	37	18	—	—
1984	"Come Back (The Story of the Reds)" (as The Mighty Wah!)	20	19	—	—
1984	"Weekends (How Come We Always End Up Here?) – The Recut!!!" (as The Mighty Wah!)	—	—	—	—
1986	"Sinful!" (as Pete Wylie and the Oedipus Wrecks)	13	13	69	26
1986	"Diamond Girl"	57	—	—	—
1987	"If I Love You"	76	—	—	—
1987	"FourElevenFortyFour"	79	—	—	—
1990	"Imperfect list" (Big Hard Excellent Fish) (written by Wylie/uncredited)	—	—	—	—
1990	"It's Grim Up North" (Justified Ancients of Mu Mu feat. Pete Wylie) (limited edition grey vinyl release)	—	—	—	—
1991	"Sinful! (Scary Jiggin' with Doctor Love)" (Pete Wylie and The Farm)	28	—	—	—
1991	"Long Tall Scally"	—	—	—	—
1991	"Don't Lose Your Dreams"	—	—	—	—
1998	"Heart as Big as Liverpool" ("Half as Big as Liverpool" radio edit / 1 track promo)	—	—	—	—
1998	"Loverboy" (1 track promo)	—	—	—	—
2000	"Songs" (6 track promo)	—	—	—	—
2000	"Sing All the Saddest Songs" (1 track promo)	—	—	—	—
2010	"Disneyland Forever" (Live @ The Zanzibar 2007 / free download)	—	—	—	—
2010	"The Milkyway Is Our Playground" (Freebass feat. Pete Wylie / Two Worlds Collide EP)	—	—	—	—
2011	"Silver and Gold" (1983 Peel Session version / free download)	—	—	—	—
2013	"The Day That Margaret Thatcher Dies!"	—	—	—	—
"—" denotes releases that did not chart or were not released in that territory.
