= Everybody Wants to Shag... The Teardrop Explodes =

Studio album by The Teardrop Explodes
- Released: April 1990
- Recorded: Spring–summer 1982; "Strange House in the Snow" - November 1980
- Genre: Alternative rock
- Length: 44:43
- Label: Fontana
- Producer: Hugh Jones

The Teardrop Explodes chronology
Wilder (1981)	Everybody Wants to Shag... The Teardrop Explodes (1990)	Piano (1990)

Singles from Everybody Wants to Shag... The Teardrop Explodes
- 1. "You Disappear from View" Released: March 1983; 2. "Serious Danger" Released: January 1990; 3. "Count to Ten and Run for Cover" Released: April 1990

Professional ratings
Review scores
Source	Rating
Allmusic	3/5 stars

Everybody Wants to Shag... The Teardrop Explodes is the third and final studio album by neo-psychedelic Liverpool band The Teardrop Explodes. When the band reconvened to record their third album in 1982, they were reduced to the trio of Julian Cope, Gary Dwyer and a reinstated David Balfe.

Tensions were high – Cope wanted to write ballads and quirky pop songs, while Balfe was more interested in recording synth-based dance music. Cope eventually dissolved the band in the middle of the sessions. The material was later released in April 1990. Cope re-recorded "Metranil Vavin" and "Pussyface" for his solo album World Shut Your Mouth. Following the album's release, some journalists commented that the music, recorded eight years earlier, appeared to prefigure the acid house boom at the end of the 1980s, with quirky keyboards, sound effects and odd rhythm tracks.

== Track listing ==
All tracks composed by Julian Cope and David Balfe; except where indicated

1. "Ouch Monkeys" - 5:31
2. "Serious Danger" - 3:33
3. "Metranil Vavin" (Cope) - 3:09
4. "Count to Ten and Run for Cover" - 3:23
5. "In-Psychlopaedia" (Cope, Gary Dwyer, Balfe) - 4:03
6. "Soft Enough for You" - 3:32
7. "You Disappear from View" (Cope) - 2:57
8. "The Challenger" - 3:00
9. "Not My Only Friend" (Cope) - 2:57
10. "Sex (Pussyface)" (Cope) - 4:12
11. "Terrorist" (Balfe) - 3:34
12. "Strange House in the Snow" (1981 B-side of "Reward") - 4:43

== Personnel ==
The Teardrop Explodes

- Julian Cope - vocals, bass guitar, violin on "Strange House in the Snow", piano on "Sex" and "Not My Only Friend"
- David Balfe - organ, piano, synthesizer, arrangements
- Gary Dwyer - drums, drum machine

with:

- Troy Tate - guitar on "You Disappear From View"
- Alan Gill - guitar on "Strange House in the Snow"
- Ron François - bass guitar on "Ouch Monkeys", "Sex" and "You Disappear from View"
- Luke Tunney - trumpet on "You Disappear from View" and "Count to Ten and Run for Cover"
- Ted Emmet - trumpet on "You Disappear from View" and "Count to Ten and Run for Cover"

Technical

- Hugh Jones - engineer
- Chris Hughes, Chris Sheldon, Clive Langer, Hugh Jones, Ross Cullum - mixing
- Pointblanc Design - artwork
