= The Teardrop Explodes =

English rock band

- Also known as: The Teardrops
- Origin: Liverpool, England
- Genres: Neo-psychedelia; post-punk; new wave
- Years active: 1978–1982
- Labels: Zoo; Fontana
- Spinoffs: Julian Cope; The Wild Swans; Bill Drummond
- Spinoff of: Crucial Three; Big in Japan; Dalek I Love You
- Past members: Julian Cope; Mick Finkler; Gary Dwyer; Paul Simpson; Ged Quinn; David Balfe; Alan Gill; Alfie Agius; Jeff Hammer; Troy Tate; Ronnie François; Ted Emmett; Andy Radek

The Teardrop Explodes were an English post-punk/neo-psychedelic band formed in Liverpool in 1978. Best known for their Top Ten UK single "Reward", the group originated as a key band in the emerging Liverpool post-punk scene of the late 1970s.

Along with other contemporary Liverpudlian groups, The Teardrop Explodes played a role in returning psychedelic elements to mainstream British rock and pop. They initially played a modernised version of lightly psychedelic, late 1960s-influenced beat-group guitar-pop sound, sometimes described as "bubblegum trance", which was typified by their debut album Kilimanjaro. Gradually assuming a more electronic direction, the group diversified into more experimental areas with their second album Wilder and would extend this into their posthumous third album, Everybody Wants to Shag... The Teardrop Explodes.

In addition to their musical reputation, The Teardrop Explodes (and frontman/main songwriter Julian Cope in particular) had a reputation for eccentric pronouncements and behaviour, sometimes verging on the self-destructive, resulting in the band's breakup in 1982. Cope went on to a solo career, while keyboard player and co-manager David Balfe continued as a record producer, became an A&R man and eventually founded Food Records. Other members included sometime Smiths producer Troy Tate, Paul Simpson (later of The Wild Swans) and drummer Gary Dwyer.

== Career ==
=== Origins ===
Having arrived in Merseyside in 1976 (as a student attending C.F. Mott College of Education), Julian Cope became involved in Liverpool's emerging post-punk scene. His first band was Crucial Three, with two native Liverpudlians – Ian McCulloch (later of Echo & the Bunnymen) and Pete Wylie (who went on to form Wah!) – in which Cope served as bass player.

"I was goaded into becoming a rock star by Bill Drummond and the pseudo-intellectual side of me thought it would be quite charming."

— Julian Cope

Cope and Wylie briefly teamed up in The Nova Mob (along with future Banshees drummer Budgie) which lasted for one gig before Cope reunited with McCulloch in the similarly short-lived Uh! (which also featured drummer Dave Pickett). Cope and McCulloch went on to form a fourth group, A Shallow Madness, retaining Pickett as drummer but recruiting organ player Paul Simpson and part-time guitarist Michael "Mick" Finkler. Cope and McCulloch's ongoing ego clashes led to the latter leaving the band during rehearsals, ultimately to form Echo and the Bunnymen. Cope, meanwhile, had befriended Liverpool scenester Gary "Rocky" Dwyer and had suggested a new band name to him – The Teardrop Explodes, taken from a panel caption in the Marvel comic strip Daredevil (No. 77). Dwyer's initial response was a laconic "that’s a weird one you’ve got there, Jules." Dwyer did, however, take the idea seriously enough to learn how to play drums in order to take it further.

With Cope taking on the roles of singer and bass guitarist, The Teardrop Explodes was completed by recruiting Simpson and Finkler from the wreck of A Shallow Madness and proved a more hardy gigging proposition than its predecessors, soon establishing itself as a live act. The band were soon signed as label acts and management clients to the up-and-coming Liverpool indie label Zoo Records, run by former Dalek I Love You & Big in Japan bass player David Balfe and future KLF man Bill Drummond. Another act on the label was Echo and the Bunnymen, who maintained a love/hate relationship and continuing rivalry with the Teardrops throughout their existence.

=== Early singles and Kilimanjaro ===
"I think we're very poppy. To me pop is something you hum. What I'm trying to do is strike a balance between triteness and greatness. People nowadays seem too embarrassed to show emotion, which is what I want."

— Julian Cope on The Teardrop Explodes

The Teardrop Explodes released their first single, "Sleeping Gas", in February 1979. Simpson's stage presence was now such that he rivalled Cope as the band's onstage focus, and by mutual agreement the two decided that the group wasn't big enough for both of them. Simpson left the band in the spring: he went on to form The Wild Swans and then link up with Ian Broudie to form Care. His initial replacement was Ged Quinn, who played on the Teardrops' subsequent British tour. However, co-manager David Balfe had also been lobbying for full Teardrops membership: by July 1979, he had succeeded in ousting Quinn and taking his place as keyboard player. (Quinn then rejoined Simpson in The Wild Swans.)

The band's next single, "Bouncing Babies", inspired a tribute song of its own: "I Can't Get Bouncing Babies by the Teardrop Explodes" by The Freshies, an ode to the difficulty of obtaining a copy of the song. In February 1980 the band released their third and final single on Zoo Records, "Treason", which was recorded in London with producers Clive Langer and Alan Winstanley. The B-side was a version of the Cope/McCulloch song "Read It in Books", which Echo & the Bunnnymen had already released as the b-side to their debut single, "The Pictures on My Wall". Both bands recorded different versions of "Read It in Books" in the future, and Cope also re-recorded the track as a solo artist.

In the summer of 1980, The Teardrop Explodes began recording their debut album, Kilimanjaro, at Rockfield Studios in Monmouthshire. The sessions were interrupted by touring requirements, and also by internal dissension. This peaked when Cope and Balfe opted to fire Mick Finkler as guitarist. Cope subsequently claimed that "Mick, to me, had got really complacent. There was no fire in what he wanted to do. Mick just wasn't bothered about pushing at all. I thought what's more important, the friendship or the band? And when it came down to it I realised the band was the most important." Finkler's sacking earned the band a fair amount of ire from the closely linked and competitive Liverpool scene (and from Ian McCulloch in particular) as well as establishing Cope's reputation as something of a tyrant.

"I must say I don't like Dave. He gets a pretty dubious character sometimes. He just plays a good role in the band that's all, but we often fight, and I mean physically. I usually win because he's a bit of a wimp... not that I'm a fighting person though. Dave is just one of the most extreme characters I've ever met. Sometimes he gets me so knotted up inside .. but then again that's good because it keeps me pushing; you know, right there…I usually do the interviews because I’m the only one with anything to say really. Like Alan just spends most of his time thinking, and Gary never says anything. I can usually speak for them better. Dave would just start pissing you off ... it sounds like a really horrible band, doesn't it?"

— Julian Cope on the strains within The Teardrop Explodes, 1980

Finkler was replaced by Balfe's Dalek I Love You colleague Alan Gill, who was in the band for the second set of Kilimanjaro sessions and re-recorded approximately half of Finkler's guitar parts. Gill was also instrumental in introducing the previously drug-free Cope to both cannabis and LSD. This ensured that a band which had previously had a strong interest only in the stylings and theory of psychedelic rock, soon began living the psychedelic lifestyle and perspective in earnest.

When released later that year, Kilimanjaro reached number 24 on the UK Albums Chart and the band toured to support it. One further single from the album, released almost a year later, in September 1981, was "Ha-Ha I'm Drowning" backed by "Poppies in the Field"; early pressings were packaged with a bonus reissue of the "Bouncing Babies" single.

=== Reward and chart success ===
In November 1980, Alan Gill left The Teardrop Explodes, claiming not to enjoy the touring lifestyle. Cope later praised him for his strong creative impact on both the band and its perspective, but also suggested that with the band's growing success Gill had found himself "afraid to compete." Gill was replaced by former Shake guitarist Troy Tate but by now Cope and Balfe's abrasive relationship had worsened to the point that Balfe was ousted as group keyboard player, although he continued to be involved with management.

As well as broadening the band's sound and outlook, Alan Gill had brought in an all-but-complete new song before his departure, which he and Cope had reworked. This was released as the band's next single, "Reward". In January 1981, the song hit No. 6 on the UK Singles Chart (with the semi-estranged Balfe joining the band to mime trumpet playing during their Top of the Pops appearance). The band relocated to London to take advantage of their growing success, although by now Cope was retreating into a drugged lifestyle and beginning "a period of unrestrained megalomania." In order to keep the band on the road as a touring concern, two London musicians were hired – keyboard player Jeff Hammer and bass player Alfie Agius (the latter freeing Cope to concentrate on vocals and rhythm guitar). Despite the internal turmoil, by 1981 The Teardrop Explodes were at the height of their popularity. In March, the band played their first American dates (a time also notable for Cope's meeting with Dorian Beslity, who would later become his second wife).

In April, the band had another Top 20 hit with the re-released "Treason" (featuring the earlier Kilimanjaro line-up of the band) which reached No. 18 in the UK Singles Chart. Another single, "When I Dream", received airplay on progressive radio in the U.S., introducing the band to new fans. In June 1981, the band embarked on another American tour. The tour proved to be a chaotic affair: neither Agius nor Hammer fitted into the group socially and Cope was retreating further into an LSD-fuelled isolation, retaining only Dwyer as trusted companion. The tour finally came adrift on the East Coast in a mess of bad business arrangements and infighting.

On their return to the UK, the five-piece Teardrop Explodes recorded the song "Passionate Friend" (which was allegedly about Cope's brief recent relationship with Ian McCulloch's sister, further increasing the friction between Cope and his former bandmate). Released as a single, it reached No. 25 in the UK chart and gained the group another Top of the Pops appearance (in which Cope performed wearing a ripped pillowcase he had made into a T-shirt, later claiming to have been tripping on LSD throughout the performance). Subsequently, both Agius and Hammer were sacked. Having sufficiently mended his relationship with Cope and Dwyer, David Balfe returned to the group as keyboard player.

=== Wilder and Club Zoo ===
Expectations were high for the band's second album, Wilder, which was recorded in London during November 1981 with a nucleus of Cope, Dwyer, Tate and Balfe. Unlike the first album, which was more of a band effort, Wilder was more the work of Cope (who took sole songwriting credit on every track on the album). It was a bleaker, more sombre work than its predecessor, cataloguing the breakup of Cope's first marriage and the mental chaos surrounding Cope and the band. The album was also a break from the solid beat-group sound of Kilimanjaro, showcasing a variety of different approaches. It reached No. 29 on the UK chart and was certified Silver by the BPI, as Kilimanjaro had been. The next single, "Colours Fly Away" stalled at No. 57 in the UK chart, signaling the end of the Teardrops as a popular singles band.

"The band was never built to last... It was like building a house on scaffolding, on top of a tank moving at three miles an hour. The higher you build it, the further removed you are from the reality that it’s actually moving and going to fall."

— Julian Cope

At the end of 1981 (and with Ronnie François now added on bass guitar) the band took up a lengthy residence at the Pyramid Club in Liverpool, where they set up "Club Zoo", playing twice a day as a five-piece. The band then undertook an extensive tour of Europe, the US and Australia, hiring trumpeter Ted Emmett (ex-64 Spoons) for the live band. By March 1982, the Teardrops' internal situation was as fraught as ever following assorted disagreements and individual meltdowns. The increasingly alienated Cope retreated to his hometown of Tamworth. At this point the band decided to strip down to a three-piece, losing Tate, Francois and Emmett.

A third single from Wilder – the uncharacteristically sombre "Tiny Children" – was released in June 1982 and narrowly missed the top 40 (No. 41 UK) despite being championed by high-profile BBC Radio One DJ, Mike Read. By now, Balfe had also developed an interest in writing songs and lobbied to join Cope as band songwriter, with Cope retained predominantly as singer and frontman.

=== Lost third album and final split ===
In September 1982, the band reconvened at Rockfield Studios to record their third album around the nucleus of Cope, Dwyer and Balfe. Creative tensions were high, as Cope wanted to write ballads and quirky pop songs, while Balfe was more interested in recording synth-based music. Balfe took over the sessions and locked Cope and Dwyer out of the studios for much of the time. Rarely able (or inclined) to add their own contributions, Cope and Dwyer worked off their frustration playing risky, stoned cross-country games with speeding jeeps. The situation culminated in a notorious (though disputed) event in which an irate Dwyer chased Balfe over the Monmouthshire hillsides with a loaded shotgun. Hating Balfe's instrumentals, Cope walked out of the sessions with only part of the singing done and the album incomplete.

To Cope's disgust, the band were already committed to a UK tour playing as a guitarless three-piece, with the instrumentation covered mainly by synthesizer and backing tapes. Cope found the tour "disastrous and demeaning": he performed most of it in a self-destructive sulk, raging at his audience, and quit the group immediately afterwards. In February 1983, Mercury Records released a delayed (and now post-breakup) Teardrop Explodes EP, "You Disappear From View", which included songs salvaged from the aborted third album. The EP received average reviews and peaked at No. 41 in the UK chart.

=== Post-split ===
Following the band's dissolution, Julian Cope began a career as a solo artist, writer and cultural commentator which continues to this day. Gary Dwyer played drums on Cope's 1984 debut solo album World Shut Your Mouth, and drummed for The Colourfield in 1986 and Balcony Dogs in the late 1980s, but subsequently left music for a variety of jobs including fork-lift driver. David Balfe moved into artist management and subsequently set up Food Records, acting as a mentor to bands such as Blur: he quit the music business in 1999. Former guitarist Troy Tate released two solo albums and worked as a producer (including work with The Smiths).

Drummer Gary Dwyer died from leukaemia on 9 August 2026.

=== Reissues ===
In 1989, various Teardrop Explodes promos were included on Copeulation, a compilation of Julian Cope’s pop videos. In April 1990, Mercury Records released a Teardrop Explodes album called Everybody Wants to Shag... The Teardrop Explodes, which had been compiled by Balfe from the abortive third album sessions and the "You Disappear From View" EP tracks. In November of the same year Teardrop Explodes manager Bill Drummond released yet another Teardrops album, Piano, which compiled all of the early Zoo Records singles. Cope’s response to these albums was mixed, though press reception was highly positive. In August 1992, Cope was able to work on a retrospective under his own terms with the release of Floored Genius: The Best of Julian Cope and The Teardrop Explodes, which featured twenty tracks personally selected by Cope, including six by The Teardrop Explodes.

In 2010, both Kilimanjaro and Wilder were reissued as multi-disc deluxe editions with bonus tracks.

== Influence ==
Interest in The Teardrop Explodes continued long after the band's demise. Cope, however, has always resisted pressure to reform the band. When asked in 2000 if the Teardrop Explodes would ever get back together, he said: "Would you ever return to having your mother wipe your asshole?" In the course of a 2008 interview he commented: "Supposedly intelligent people say to me: 'Don't you think you'd be more successful if you re-formed The Teardrop Explodes?' I'm doing all this stuff to keep myself invigorated every day, hanging out with people I believe are culture heroes, and you think I'm doing all this because it hasn't yet occurred to me to reform The Teardrop Explodes?"

In June 2010, the magazine Mojo presented The Teardrop Explodes with their Inspiration Award. The magazine called the band "the great ambassadors of psychedelia in the '80s when the genre was all but dead", and noted their influence on artists such as Blur and Morrissey. The award was presented by Blur bassist Alex James. David Balfe, Gary Dwyer and Alan Gill all showed up to accept the award; Julian Cope ultimately refused to attend the ceremony.

== Discography ==
- Kilimanjaro (1980)
- Wilder (1981)
- Everybody Wants to Shag... The Teardrop Explodes (1990) - recorded 1982
