= Troy Tate =

- Origin: Liverpool, England
- Genres: New wave
- Occupation(s): Singer, songwriter, musician
- Instrument: Guitar
- Labels: Why-Fi, Rough Trade, Sire

Troy Tate is an English musician and record producer who was a member of several bands including the Teardrop Explodes and Fashion as well as working as a solo artist, for which he is best known for the single "Love Is ..."

== Biography ==
Born in Liverpool, England, Tate's first band was the Cheltenham-based punk rock band Index, who released one single, "Jet Lag" c/w "Total Bland" in 1978. He moved on to join former members of the Rezillos in the band Shake, recording two singles with this band. In 1981, he first recorded as a solo artist, releasing the "Thomas" single on the RCA label Why-Fi. He joined the Teardrop Explodes in late 1980, replacing Alan Gill on guitar, and playing on the Wilder album. While with the band, he continued his solo career, releasing "Lifeline" in 1982. He left The Teardrop Explodes, and joined Fashion in October 1982, leaving in 1983 when he signed to Rough Trade Records, for whom he debuted that year with "Love Is ...".

Tate moved on to Sire Records in 1984, who issued a remixed version of "Thomas", which was followed by his debut solo album, Ticket to the Dark the same year. The album featured contributions from former-Rezillos and Shake drummer Ali Paterson, former-Teardrop Explodes member David Balfe, Nicky Holland, Virginia Astley and Rolo McGinty of the Woodentops, and was described by Trouser Press as "an exceptionally good record". A second album, Liberty, followed in 1985, which proved to be Tate's swansong.

== The Smiths – The Troy Tate Sessions ==
When the Smiths (also on Rough Trade) were looking for a producer for their debut album, Tate was chosen; although after the album was recorded, the band decided to reject these recordings and re-record the album with producer John Porter. The original version of the album is widely known as The Troy Tate Sessions and has only been released on bootlegs. "Jeane" from these sessions was released as the B-side of the "This Charming Man" single, and the version of "Pretty Girls Make Graves" was the B-side to "I Started Something I Couldn't Finish". Tate's version of "Reel Around the Fountain" had been scheduled for release as a single in 1983, a disc of which was included in a collectors edition of Complete in 2011.

== Solo discography ==
=== Albums ===
- Ticket to the Dark (1984) Sire
- Liberty (1985) Sire

=== Singles ===
- "Thomas" (1981) Why-Fi
- "Lifeline" (1982) Why-Fi
- "Love Is ..." (1983) Rough Trade
- "Thomas" (1984) Sire
- "Sorrow" (1985) Sire
