= Zeus B. Held =

German music producer and musician (born 1950)

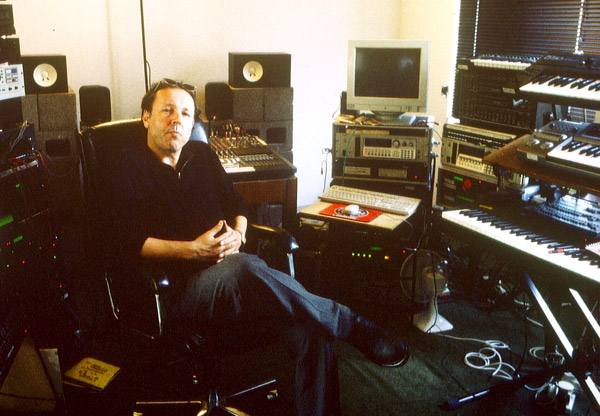

Background information
- Born: Bernd Held; 24 August 1950 (age 76); Germany
- Occupations: Musician; record producer

Zeus B. Held is a German music producer and musician, known for his work in the 1970s, 1980s and 1990s. He was involved with several artists of the krautrock, disco, and new wave era, such as Birth Control, Rockets, Gina X Performance, Dead or Alive, John Foxx, Fashion, and Men Without Hats on their successful album Pop Goes the World.

His musical education on piano and reed instruments made him also a well-respected arranger. Spending 6 years as keyboard player and multi-instrumentalist with the German prog-rock group Birth Control (6 LPs) gave him experience as a touring musician. After these years on the road he worked as producer, session musician, programmer, and engineer in German and French studios before moving to London in 1982.

== Career ==
His production "combines electronic Teutonic sounds with a soulful sensibility for melodic expression". (NME, June 1982) After writing and producing the groundbreaking album by Gina X Performance Nice Mover, (followed by three more Gina X albums), his first UK production credits were with Fashion and Dead or Alive, he produced Pete Wylie's Sinful album and an album by Men Without Hats for Polygram US which yielded a number one in many European countries and a US Top 20 hit with "Pop Goes The World". This was followed by two albums with Transvision Vamp on MCA with a top five single and a number one album. He produced the album Freaky Trigger (1989) by the Scottish group Win. Zeus went on to write and produce two successful albums with Nina Hagen (Nina Hagen in 1990, and Street in 1991), Udo Lindenberg's Casanova, National Velvet, Spear of Destiny, and two albums with Marc Parrot.

He has produced and co-written an album with South African group Shikisha, an EP with Victoria Wilson-James, and recorded and produced an album with Hawkwind – Distant Horizons.

In 1995 he wrote and recorded the music for a worldwide advertising campaign for Swatch. His 1987 'E Reg' remix of Gary Numan's "Cars" hit the British charts again as the 'Premier Mix' in March '96.

After extended travelling round the world he produced his own two projects: No Sweat, a jazzy hip-hop album with diverse guest singers and assorted samples and involving his collected samples "Inma Wiru", his Australian project under the banner of "Digital Dreaming", distributed by Warner Music. During his long stays in Australia Zeus also toured and recorded with Aboriginal Singer and Guitarist Frank Yamma and his band.

In 1999 he co-wrote Nina Hagen's single "Der Poetenclub" which also features the voice of Falco (of "Rock Me Amadeus" fame). His production and arranging skills led to intensive work on audio-visuals and soundtracks, one of which was a British film shown at the Cannes 2001 festival, Mad Dogs.

Since 2003 he has divided his time between working in his Freiburg, Germany-based studio and his London KGBeat studio and production setup. From 2005 Zeus he also worked with "Jazz & Rock Schulen Freiburg", where he created and realised the 3-year project "EuroPop", which was a musician's networking, events (EuroPop Festival in Neuf-Brisach) and education program founded by the European Union. His musical ventures saw Zeus writing for and playing with big bands and orchestras.

The 2011 retrospective album, Voice-Versa, is a compilation of compositions involving the usage of a Sennheiser vocoder which Zeus acquired in 1978, featuring solo material as well as edited tracks by Gina X Performance and Rockets. The release of his remixed and remastered Australian album Dream2Machine on the Broome-based label Desert Ocean Productions in late 2013 also marks Zeus' continual creative collaboration with Jim Lampi and his multimedia approach to music and the arts.

His solo adventure Logic of Coincidence, released June 2015 on Les Disques du Crepuscule, is an album of electronic music which features US cult author Luke Rhinehart's voice and readings on two tracks. A remix of one album track by "Dream Control" marks the start of Zeus' collaboration with former Tangerine Dream member Steve Schroyder. In August 2017 Dream Control's first album entitled "Zeitgeber" is released on Planetware Records. In October a special edited vinyl version of this album was released on U.S. label Medical Records.

Currently Dream Control is working on a film project which should be released in early 2021. In 2019 Zeus teamed up with Guru Guru band leader Mani Neumeier to record an album of adventurous tracks under the name of Mani & Zeus "The Secret Lives". Released on Düsseldorf label Bellerophon Records in September 2020 it had some great response by the media. In October 2020 Zeus was awarded with the City of Cologne's Holger Czukay Prize in “appreciation of life's work” for his writing and production work with "Gina X Performance".

== Discography ==
=== Albums ===
- Birth Control : 7 albums as keyboard, saxophonist and co-writer in the 70s.
- Zeus B. Held (solo): Zeus' Amusement 1978 Metronome,
- Europium 1979, Teldec/Telefunken
- "Attack Time" 1981 CBS,
- Visionova (Soundtrack) 1980, Sport & Culture
- Gina X Performance: "Nice Mover" 1978 EMI, "X- Traordinaire" 1980 EMI,
- "Voyeur" 1981 EMI, "Yinglish" 1981 Statik/Virgin UK
- Fashion: "Fabrique" 1982 Arista, "Twilight of Idols" 1984 CBS
- John Foxx: "The Golden Section" 1983 Virgin
- Dead or Alive: Sophisticated Boom Boom 1984 CBS
- Chaz Jankel: "Looking at you" 1985 A&M
- Die Krupps: "Entering the Arena" 1985 Voice Versa/Statik
- Spear of Destiny: "Outland" 1986 Virgin,
- Riff: "Mission Love" 1989 RCA
- "S.O.D.'s Law" 1992 Burning Rome Records
- Claire Grogan: "Claire Grogan" 1986 London
- Men Without Hats: "Pop Goes The World" 1987 Polygram US
- Pete Wylie: "Sinful" 1987 Circa/Virgin
- Kamerata: "Lovers & Other Strangers" 1987 Polydor
- Transvision Vamp: "Pop-Art" 1988 MCA, "Velveteen" 1989 MCA
- Win: "Freaky Trigger" 1988 Virgin
- Music Art: Soundtrack for Multi Media Installation, 1988 Champagne Music CH
- Udo Lindenberg "Casanova", 1988 Deutsche Grammophon
- Nina Hagen: "Nina Hagen" 1989 Phonogram GmbH, "Street" 1991 Phonogram GmbH
- National Velvet: "Courage" 1989 Capitol Canada
- Doctor Rain: "The Spoon Run Away" 1991 Imago
- Marc Parrot: "Solo Para Locos" 1992 WEA Spain, "Solo Para Ninos" 1995 WEA Spain
- The Bozfor: "Endorphenia" 1992 EMI-Electrola
- The Fetish: "The Fetish" EP, 1992
- Aunt Jamima: "Birth" 1993 Sony Germany
- Candy Dates: "This Easy Life" 1994 WEA
- Vortex: "Transistor Revenge" 1995 Vortex/Roadrunner
- Yulduz Usmanova: "Binafscha" 1996 Blue Flame
- Zeus & the Spiritual Traders: "Compassion" 1996 H.A.N.D.spun, BMG
- Vortex : "Energize" 1996 Vortex/Roadrunner
- Strobe: "Lost in Space" 1997 Vortex/Roadrunner
- Octavia: "HipOpera", Janus Media 1998
- Nokturnl : "Point Your Finger". EP, Heartbeat, Australia 1998
- Digital Dreaming : "Inma Wiru 1998, Massive Recordings, Australia
- Shikisha : Maluju, Toshiba/EMI 2000
- Bulletproof Electric Revue : "Cake, Pills and Pain", Northern Recordings, 2002
- Held Lampi Project : "Digital Dreaming", Kissing Fish Music, 2004
- Zeus B. Held : "Voice-Versa", LTM 2011
- Held Lampi Project : "Dream2machine", Desert Ocean Productions, 2013
- Zeus B. Held : "Logic of Coincidence", Les Disques du Crepuscule 2015
- Zeus B. Held : "Vinyl Collection", Medical Records, 2016
- Dream Control : "Zeitgeber", Planetware Records, 2017
- Mani Neumeier & Zeus B. Held : "The Secret Lives", Bellerophon Records, 2020

=== Singles ===
- Zeus: "Fool on the Hill" 1978 Metronome, "Musik, Music, Musique" 1979 Teldec
- Rockets: "On the Road Again", 1978 Decca France
- Gina X Performance: "Nice Mover”1978 EMI, "No G.D.M" 1979/82 EMI, "No G.D.M '85"
- 1985 Statik, "Do It Yourself" 1979 EMI, "Striptease" 1980 EMI, "Weekend Twist"
- 1980 EMI, "Drive My Car" 1984 Statik, "Harley Davidson" 1984 Statik
- Fashion: "Move On" 1982 Arista, "Streetplayer" 1982 Arista, "Something in Your Picture" 1982 Arista, "Love Shadow" 1983 Arista, "Eye Talk" 1984 CBS/Sony,
- "Dreaming" 1984 CBS/Sony, "You in the Night" 1984 CBS/Sony
- John Foxx: "Endlessly" 1983 Virgin, "Your Dress" 1983 Virgin, "Like a Miracle" 1983 Virgin
- Dead Or Alive: "What I Want 1983 CBS/Sony, I'd Do Anything" 1983 CBS/Sony, "That's the Way I Like It" 1984 CBS/Sony
- Le Clan: "Vive le Mambo" 1984 MN/Barclay France
- Lilidrop: "Tartine Breakfast" 1982 Eurodisc/Virgin France
- Cha Cha at the Opera: "A Cha Cha at the Opera" 1982 Island
- Impulse: "The Prize" 1983 Polydor
- This Island Earth: "See That Glow" 1984 Magnet, "Take Me to the Fire" 1985 Magnet
- The Spy: "Big Brother" 1984 Trigger /Disques
- Brilliant: "Wait For It" 1984 WEA
- Ellery Bop: "Torn Apart" 1985 WEA
- Academy: "Tonight" 1985 RCA, "Stand Up" 1985 RCA, “You Are in My System” 1986 RCA, "Keep on Pushing" 1986 RCA
- East of Java: "Different World" 1985 RCA
- Ranch: "Put Your Love in Me" 1985 Sedition/PTR
- The Krupps: "RISK “ 1985 Voice Versa
- Annabella Wu: "Under The Gun" 1985 RCA/Arista
- Angel Chorus: "Devil on My Shoulder" 1986 Virgin
- Pete Wylie: "Diamond Girl" 1986 Virgin
- Michael van Dyke: "I Do" 1986 Metronome
- Spear of Destiny: "Strangers in Our Town" 1986 Virgin, “Never Take Me Alive”, 1987 Virgin, "Was That You?”1987 Virgin, "The Traveller" 1987 Virgin
- Claire Grogan: "Love Bomb" 1987 London Records
- Men Without Hats: "Pop Goes the World" 1987 Phonogram US, "Moonbeam, featuring Ian Anderson" 1988 Phonogram US
- Kamerata: "Heroin" 1987 Polydor GmbH "Charlotte" 1987 Polydor GMBH, "Horseback" 1988 Polydor GMBH
- Eric Robinson: "No.1", 1988 MCA
- Udo Lindenberg : "Airport", "Die Klavierlehrerin" Polydor 1988
- Transvision Vamp: "Tell that girl”1988 MC, "Baby I Don, t Care" 1989 MCA, "Landslide of Love", 1989 MCA, "I want your love" 1990 MCA
- Riff "No Mercy" 1989 RCA
- The Marines: "Go Go Now" 1989 Sony UK, "Say Goodbye" 1989 Sony UK
- Nina Hagen : "Hold Me" Phonogram 1989, "Viva Las Vegas" Phonogram1989 "Michail, Michail" Phonogram 1990
- Riff "All or nothing" 1990 RCA
- Flesh For Lulu: "Every Little Word" 1989 Beggars Banquet
- Barry Ryan: "Turn Away" 1989 BMG/Ariola
- Tony Head: "Sweet Transvestite" 1990 RCA/BMG,
- Sunsonic: "Drive Away", 1990 Polydor
- Exotic Birds: "Stay OnThis Road" 1990 Alpha
- See See Rider: "Da Da Love" 1990 Lazy
- Nina Hagen : "Blumen Fuer Die Damen", Phonogram 1991 "In My World" Phonogram 1991
- The Fetish : "Psychotic Sympathy" Voice Versa
- The Bones: "Hot" 1993 EMI-Eletrola, "Come On" 1993 EMI-Eletrola
- Dein Cyan: "An Solchen Tagen" 1994 EMI-Eletrola
- Hexenhaus: "Hallo & Tschuess" 1995 SingSing Record GMBH/Hansa
- Charlie's Angels: "Honey" 1995 Org Records
- Strobe: "In ain't out" 1996 Vortex
- Lani: "Reach for the sky" 1997 Shock Australia
- Zeus & the Spiritual Traders: "Buddha of Compassion", 1997 H.A.N.D.spun
- Disco Pistols: "Talk to Me", Org Records, 1998
- Nina Hagen : "Der Poetenclub", Orbit Records, 2000
- Victoria Wilson James: "Fandango", Arriva, 2000
- Bulletproof Electric Revue : "2 Cut A Long Story Short", Northern Recordings, 2002

=== Remixes and additional productions ===
- Dead or Alive: "Misty Circles" 1983 CBS/Sony, "Lover Come Back" 1985 CBS/Sony
- Alphaville: "Big in Japan" 1984 WEA
- Black Uhuru: "Solidarity" 1984 Island
- Peter Godwin: "Window Shopping" 1984 Polydor
- Barb: "Yeah" 1984 Magnet
- Kissing The Pink: "The Other Side of Heaven" 1985 Magnet
- East of Java: "Taipo Say Drum" 1984 RCA/Arista
- 5 TA: "Heaven" 1986 Virgin France
- Love & Rockets: "Ying and Yang" 1986 Beggars Banquet
- Pascal Rod: "On En Fera" 1986 Virgin France
- Alliss Terrell: "Miss Florida" 1986 Virgin France
- Etienne Daho:”Tattoo Shoulder" 1986 Virgin France
- Frances: "Piege Pour La" 1986 Virgin France
- Pete Wylie: "Sinful" 1986 Virgin
- Two Nations: "Who Do You Believe?” 1986 Virgin
- Killing Joke: "Love Like Blood" 1986 Virgin, "Adorations" 1986 Virgin,
- "War Dances" 1986 Virgin, Sanity 1986 Virgin
- 52nd Street: "Are You Receiving Me?” 1986 Virgin
- Simple Minds: "Ghostdancing" 1986 Virgin, "Jungleland" 1986 Virgin
- Secession: "New Messiah" 1986 Virgin
- The Mission: "Wasteland" 1986 Phonogram
- Super Enig Matix: "Touch The Beat" 1987 MDM Records
- Gary Numan: "Cars" 1987 Beggars Banquet
- The Fall: "Hit The North" 1987 Beggars Banquet
- Udo Lindenberg: "Ein Kommen Und Gehen" 1988 Polydor GMBH
- Plan B: "Beam Me Up Scottie" 1988 SMV
- Erasure: "No G.D.M". 1990 Mute
- Exotic Birds: "Road to Heaven", 1990 Alpha
- Azucar Moreno: "Torero" 1991 Sony Spain
- The Bones: "Come On" 1993 EMI-Electrola
- Fields of the Nephilim: "Exodus", EP 1996 Beggars Banquet
- Yulduz Usmanova: "Binafscha”1996 Blue Flame
- Willie & The W.W.S.: "Mumbridge Boogie" 1997 Massive Records
- Hawkwind: "Love in Space" 1998 EBS/Vital

=== Music for audio-visuals and campaigns ===
- Advertisement: C&A, Swatch, Audi, Rowntree, Marbles, Direct Line, Weightwatchers, Africa Aid,
- TV: ZDF, BBC2, Saturday Review, Channel Plus, Trouble TV, CAAMA TV,
- Films: Le Cauchemar, Blind Man, Mad Dogs
