= Shine (compilation series) =

UK compilation album series

Shine was a various artists compilation album series released by PolyGram TV in Britain from 1995 to 1998, centring on indie rock, largely from new British bands (several American bands, like Green Day and Dinosaur Jr. appeared sparingly). The series began in 1995 to capitalize on the Britpop scene. In total, there were ten Shine albums, plus a 'Best of '97' compilation and a final 'Best of Shine' in 1998. The series ended in the late 1990s as the Britpop era passed.

== Shine ==
Released 27 April 1995

1. Blur - "Parklife"
2. Oasis - "Cigarettes & Alcohol"
3. New Order - "Regret"
4. The Cranberries - "Zombie"
5. Suede - "Animal Nitrate"
6. Elastica - "Connection"
7. Pulp - "Do You Remember the First Time?"
8. Dodgy - "So Let Me Go Far"
9. Shed Seven - "Speakeasy"
10. Green Day - "Welcome to Paradise"
11. The Smiths - "How Soon Is Now?"
12. James - "Sit Down"
13. Electronic - "Getting Away with It"
14. The Wonder Stuff - "The Size of a Cow"
15. The Farm - "All Together Now"
16. Inspiral Carpets - "Dragging Me Down"
17. The Charlatans - "Weirdo"
18. Jesus Jones - "International Bright Young Thing"
19. Dinosaur Jr. - "Feel the Pain"
20. The House of Love - "Shine On"

== Shine Too: 20 New Brilliant Indie Hits ==
Released 1 August 1995

1. Oasis : "Some Might Say"
2. Paul Weller : "The Changingman"
3. Ash : "Girl from Mars"
4. The Stone Roses : "Love Spreads"
5. Edwyn Collins : "A Girl Like You"
6. The Boo Radleys : "Wake Up Boo!"
7. The Lightning Seeds : "Change"
8. Dodgy : "Staying Out for the Summer"
9. Cast : "Finetime"
10. Elastica : "Waking Up"
11. The Cranberries : "Ridiculous Thoughts"
12. Sleeper : "Vegas"
13. Gigolo Aunts : "Where I Find My Heaven"
14. Gene : "Haunted By You"
15. Belly : "Now They'll Sleep"
16. Teenage Fanclub : "Sparky's Dream"
17. Suede : "Stay Together"
18. Happy Mondays : "Kinky Afro"
19. Joy Division : "Love Will Tear Us Apart '95"
20. Pulp : "Underwear"

== Shine 3 ==
Released 26 October 1995

1. Pulp : "Common People"
2. Oasis : "Roll with It"
3. Supergrass : "Alright"
4. The Lightning Seeds : "Marvellous"
5. Sleeper : "What Do I Do Now?"
6. Menswear : "Stardust"
7. Cast : "Alright"
8. Garbage : "Only Happy When It Rains"
9. Echobelly : "King of the Kerb"
10. Ash : "Angel Interceptor"
11. Blur : "End of a Century"
12. The Stone Roses : "One Love"
13. The Boo Radleys : "From the Bench at Belvidere"
14. Gene : "Olympian"
15. The Charlatans : "Just When You're Thinkin' Things Over"
16. Levellers : "Fantasy"
17. Marion : "Let's All Go Together"
18. Shed Seven : "Where Have You Been Tonight?"
19. The Wannadies : "Might Be Stars"
20. Happy Mondays : "Step On"

== Shine Four ==
Released 25 January 1996

1. Cast : "Sandstorm"
2. Pulp : "Mis-Shapes"
3. Supergrass : "Mansize Rooster"
4. Menswear : "Sleeping In"
5. Shed Seven : "Getting Better"
6. Northern Uproar : "From a Window"
7. Ocean Colour Scene : "The Riverboat Song"
8. Skunk Anansie : "Weak"
9. Number One Cup : "Divebomb"
10. Marion : "Time"
11. Longpigs : "Far"
12. Blur : "The Universal"
13. Echobelly : "Dark Therapy"
14. Gene : "For the Dead"
15. The Stone Roses : "Ten Storey Love Song"
16. Radiohead : "Just"
17. The Lightning Seeds : "Lucky You"
18. The Cardigans : "Carnival"
19. Dubstar : "Anywhere"
20. The Smokin' Mojo Filters : "Come Together"
21. Oasis and Friends : "Fade Away"

== Shine 5 ==
Released 15 July 1996

=== CD One ===
1. Ash : "Goldfinger"
2. Shed Seven : "Going for Gold"
3. Dodgy : "In a Room"
4. Longpigs : "She Said"
5. The Cranberries : "Salvation"
6. Kula Shaker : "Grateful When You're Dead"
7. Paul Weller : "Out of the Sinking"
8. Ocean Colour Scene : "The Day We Caught the Train"
9. Skunk Anansie : "Charity"
10. Cast : "History"
11. Blur : "Stereotypes"
12. The Divine Comedy : "Something for the Weekend"
13. Space : "Female of the Species"
14. Super Furry Animals : "Something 4 the Weekend"
15. Supergrass : "Going Out"
16. Marion : "Sleep"
17. Sleeper : "Inbetweener"
18. Booth and the Bad Angel : "I Believe"
19. Blameless : "Breathe (A Little Deeper)"
20. Gin Blossoms : "Follow You Down"
21. The Cardigans : "Rise and Shine"
22. The Wannadies : "You and Me Song"

=== CD Two ===
1. Oasis : "Don't Look Back in Anger"
2. Pulp : "Sorted for E's & Wizz"
3. Ash : "Oh Yeah"
4. Menswear : "Being Brave"
5. Radiohead : "Fake Plastic Trees"
6. Gene : "Sleep Well Tonight"
7. Suede : "The Wild Ones"
8. Northern Uproar : "Town"
9. The Stone Roses : "One Love"
10. Mansun : "Take It Easy Chicken"
11. Lush : "Single Girl"
12. Terrorvision : "Perseverance"
13. Levellers : "Hope St."
14. 60 Ft. Dolls : "Talk to Me"
15. Audioweb : "Into My World"
16. Eggman : "Not Bad Enough"
17. Whipping Boy : "Twinkle"
18. The Folk Implosion : "Natural One"
19. Salt : "Bluster"
20. Garbage : "Queer"

== Shine 6 ==
Released 16 September 1996

=== CD One ===
1. Paul Weller : "Peacock Suit"
2. The Charlatans : "One to Another"
3. Manic Street Preachers : "A Design for Life"
4. Suede : "Trash"
5. Dodgy : "Good Enough"
6. Ocean Colour Scene : "The Circle"
7. Shed Seven : "On Standby"
8. Menswear : "We Love You"
9. The Cardigans : "Lovefool"
10. Blur : "Charmless Man"
11. Ben Folds Five : "Underground"
12. The Divine Comedy : "Becoming More Like Alfie"
13. My Life Story : "12 Reasons Why I Love Her"
14. Sleeper : "Sale of the Century"
15. Babybird : "Goodnight"
16. Joyrider : "Rush Hour"
17. The Boo Radleys : "What's in the Box? (See Whatcha Got)"
18. The Presidents of the United States of America : "Lump"
19. Rocket from the Crypt : "On a Rope"

=== CD Two ===
1. The Cranberries : "Free to Decide"
2. Electronic : "Forbidden City"
3. Oasis : "Champagne Supernova"
4. Cast : "Walkaway"
5. Pulp : "Something Changed"
6. Longpigs : "On and On"
7. Terrorvision : "Bad Actress"
8. Levellers : "Exodus" (Live)
9. Mansun : "Stripper Vicar"
10. Imperial Teen : "You're One"
11. Northern Uproar : "Livin' It Up"
12. Heavy Stereo : "Chinese Burn"
13. Elcka : "Look at You Now"
14. Lush : "500 (Shake Baby Shake)"
15. Dubstar : "Elevator Song"
16. Sarah Cracknell : "Anymore"
17. Ruth : "Valentine's Day"
18. Bawl : "Beyond Safe Ways"
19. Sussed : "One In a Million"
20. Kenickie : "Punka"
21. Placebo : "36 Degrees"

== Shine 7 ==
Released 11 November 1996

=== CD One ===
1. Cast : "Flying"
2. Suede : "Beautiful Ones"
3. Manic Street Preachers : "Everything Must Go"
4. Gene : "Fighting Fit"
5. Skunk Anansie : "Twisted (Everyday Hurts)"
6. Longpigs : "Lost Myself"
7. Pulp : "Disco 2000"
8. The Lightning Seeds : "Ready or Not"
9. Ocean Colour Scene : "You've Got It Bad"
10. The Boo Radleys : "C'mon Kids"
11. Silver Sun : "Lava"
12. Bis : "Kandy Pop"
13. Placebo : "Teenage Angst"
14. Soundgarden : "Burden in My Hand"
15. Terrorvision : "Celebrity Hit List"
16. Speedy : "Boy Wonder"
17. Geneva : "No One Speaks"
18. Echobelly : "Great Things"
19. Sleeper : "Nice Guy Eddie"
20. My Life Story : "Sparkle"
21. Oasis : "Morning Glory"

=== CD Two ===
1. Garbage featuring Tricky : "Milk"
2. Sneaker Pimps : "6 Underground:
3. Dodgy : "If You're Thinking of Me"
4. Shed Seven : "Chasing Rainbows"
5. Electronic : "For You"
6. Babybird : "You're Gorgeous"
7. Gorky's Zygotic Mynci : "Patio Song"
8. Space : "Neighbourhood"
9. Blur : "Girls & Boys"
10. The Divine Comedy : "The Frog Princess"
11. Oasis : "Whatever"
12. The Supernaturals : "Lazy Lover"
13. Supergrass : "Lenny"
14. Super Furry Animals : "If You Don't Want Me to Destroy You"
15. Paul Weller : "Broken Stones"
16. The Lemonheads : "If I Could Talk I'd Tell You"
17. Radiohead : "Street Spirit (Fade Out)"
18. Dubstar : "Not So Manic Now"
19. Catatonia : "You've Got a Lot to Answer For"
20. The Aloof : "One Night Stand"

== Shine 8 ==
Released 1 April 1997

=== CD One ===
1. Cast : "Free Me"
2. The Charlatans : "North Country Boy"
3. Bush : "Swallowed"
4. Reef : "Place Your Hands"
5. Placebo : "Nancy Boy"
6. 3 Colours Red : Sixty Mile Smile
7. Manic Street Preachers : Kevin Carter
8. Mansun : "Wide Open Space"
9. Kula Shaker : "Tattva"
10. Monaco : "What Do You Want from Me?"
11. James : "She's a Star"
12. Gene : "We Could Be Kings"
13. Symposium : "Farewell to Twilight"
14. The Lightning Seeds : "Sugar Coated Iceberg"
15. My Life Story : "The King of Kissingdom"
16. White Town : "Your Woman"
17. Gorky's Zygotic Mynci : "Diamond Dew"
18. The Divine Comedy : "Everybody Knows (Except You)"
19. Dodgy : "Found You"
20. Oasis : "The Masterplan"

=== CD Two ===
1. Suede : "Lazy"
2. Blur : "Beetlebum"
3. Depeche Mode : "It's No Good"
4. Eels : "Novocaine for the Soul"
5. Skunk Anansie : "Hedonism (Just Because You Feel Good)"
6. Pulp : "Babies"
7. Shed Seven : "Bully Boy"
8. Pavement : "Shady Lane"
9. Bennet : "Someone Always Gets There First"
10. Sleeper : Statuesque
11. Ruth : "I Don't Know"
12. Jocasta : "Go"
13. The Candyskins : "Monday Morning"
14. Tiger : "Race"
15. Grass Show : "1962"
16. Travis : "U16 Girls"
17. The Wannadies : "Hit"
18. Supergrass : "Caught by the Fuzz"
19. Intastella : "Skyscraper"
20. Audioweb : "Bankrobber"

== Shine 9 ==
Released 1 September 1997

=== CD One ===
1. Oasis : "D'You Know What I Mean?"
2. Suede : "Filmstar"
3. Paul Weller : "Heavy Soul (Part 1)"
4. The Charlatans : "How High"
5. Supergrass : "Sun Hits the Sky"
6. Placebo : "Bruise Pristine"
7. Ocean Colour Scene : "Hundred Mile High City"
8. Republica : "Drop Dead Gorgeous"
9. Mansun : "Taxloss"
10. Levellers : "What a Beautiful Day"
11. Blur : "On Your Own"
12. Beck : "Where It's At"
13. The Cardigans : "Your New Cuckoo"
14. Silver Sun : "Julia"
15. Super Furry Animals : "The International Language of Screaming"
16. Monaco : "Sweet Lips"
17. James : "Tomorrow"
18. Reef : "Come Back Brighter"
19. Radiohead : "Paranoid Android"

=== CD Two ===
1. The Seahorses : "Blinded by the Sun"
2. Cast : "Guiding Star"
3. Echo & the Bunnymen : "Nothing Lasts Forever"
4. Gene : "Speak to Me Someone"
5. The Lightning Seeds : "You Showed Me"
6. Teenage Fanclub : "I Don't Want Control of You"
7. Dubstar : "No More Talk"
8. Sneaker Pimps : "Post-Modern Sleaze"
9. The Supernaturals : "Love Has Passed Away"
10. Geneva : "Best Regrets"
11. Northern Uproar : "A Girl I Once Knew"
12. Stereophonics : "A Thousand Trees"
13. Symposium : "Fairweather Friend"
14. The Wannadies : "Shorty"
15. Delirious? : "Promise"
16. Warm Jets : "Hurricane"
17. Spiritualized : "Electricity"
18. Cornershop : "Brimful of Asha"
19. Ruth : "Fear of Flying"
20. Eels : "Susan's House"

== Shine: Best of 97 ==
Released 24 November 1997

=== CD One ===
1. Pulp : "Help the Aged"
2. Oasis : "Stand by Me"
3. Ash : "A Life Less Ordinary"
4. The Seahorses : "Love Is the Law"
5. Ocean Colour Scene : "Better Day"
6. The Sundays : "Summertime"
7. Blur : "Beetlebum"
8. The Charlatans : "Tellin' Stories"
9. Paul Weller : "Friday Street"
10. Echo & the Bunnymen : "Nothing Lasts Forever"
11. Cast : "Live the Dream"
12. Suede : "Saturday Night"
13. Eels : "Novocaine for the Soul"
14. Primal Scream : "Star"
15. Gene : "We Could Be Kings"
16. Skunk Anansie : "Brazen (Weep)"
17. Rialto : "Monday Morning 5.19"
18. Radiohead : "Paranoid Android"

=== CD Two ===
1. Black Grape : "Get Higher"
2. Supergrass : "Richard III"
3. Placebo : "Nancy Boy"
4. Republica : "Drop Dead Gorgeous"
5. Mansun : "She Makes My Nose Bleed"
6. Hurricane #1 : "Step into My World"
7. Reef : "Come Back Brighter"
8. Bush : "Swallowed"
9. Morrissey : "Alma Matters"
10. Stereophonics : "Traffic"
11. Feeder : "High"
12. The Cardigans : "Lovefool"
13. Monaco : "What Do You Want from Me?"
14. Levellers : "What a Beautiful Day"
15. James : "She's a Star"
16. Travis : "Tied to the 90's"
17. Sleeper : "She's a Good Girl"
18. Teenage Fanclub : "Ain't That Enough"
19. Super Furry Animals : "Play It Cool"
20. 3 Colours Red : "Sixty Mile Smile"

== Shine 10 ==
Released 17 August 1998

=== CD One ===
1. Garbage : "I Think I'm Paranoid"
2. Catatonia : "Road Rage"
3. Eagle-Eye Cherry : "Save Tonight"
4. Ian Brown : "My Star"
5. Embrace : "All You Good Good People"
6. The Dandy Warhols : "Not If You Were the Last Junkie on Earth"
7. Fatboy Slim : "The Rockafeller Skank"
8. Space : "Begin Again"
9. Natalie Imbruglia : "Big Mistake"
10. Mansun : "Closed for Business"
11. Rialto : "Untouchable"
12. Reef : "Yer Old"
13. Garbage : "Push It"
14. Warm Jets : "Hurricane '98"
15. Super Furry Animals : "Ice Hockey Hair"
16. Primal Scream : "Burning Wheel"
17. The Mighty Mighty Bosstones : "The Impression That I Get"
18. Chumbawamba : "Amnesia"
19. Cornershop : "Brimful of Asha" (Norman Cook Remix)

=== CD Two ===
1. Pulp : "A Little Soul"
2. Radiohead : "Karma Police"
3. Bernard Butler : "Stay"
4. James : "Destiny Calling"
5. The Seahorses : "Love Me and Leave Me"
6. Travis : "More Than Us"
7. Shed Seven : "She Left Me on Friday"
8. Silver Sun : "Golden Skin"
9. Drugstore featuring Thom Yorke : "El President"
10. Puressence : "This Feeling"
11. Theaudience : "A Pessimist Is Never Disappointed"
12. Gene : "Where Are They Now?"
13. Babybird : "Bad Old Man"
14. Ocean Colour Scene featuring P. P. Arnold : "It's a Beautiful Thing"
15. Stereophonics : "Local Boy in the Photograph"
16. Space and Cerys Matthews : "The Ballad of Tom Jones"
17. Lilys : A Nanny In Manhattan"
18. Levellers : "Celebrate"
19. Symposium : "Blue"
20. Comfort : "The Proof of You"

== The Best of Shine ==
Released 16 November 1998

=== CD One ===
1. Pulp : "Common People"
2. Placebo : "Nancy Boy"
3. Supergrass : "Richard III"
4. Garbage : "Stupid Girl"
5. Republica : "Ready to Go"
6. The Charlatans : "The Only One I Know"
7. Manic Street Preachers : "You Love Us"
8. Ocean Colour Scene : "The Riverboat Song"
9. Blur : "M.O.R."
10. Mansun : "Wide Open Space"
11. Chumbawamba : "Tubthumping"
12. Reef : "Place Your Hands"
13. Elastica : "Waking Up"
14. The Boo Radleys : "Wake Up Boo!"
15. Paul Weller : "The Changingman"
16. The Wannadies : "You and Me Song"
17. Oasis : "All Around the World"

=== CD Two ===
1. Oasis : "Wonderwall"
2. James : "Sit Down"
3. Embrace : "All You Good Good People"
4. Radiohead : "Street Spirit (Fade Out)"
5. The Stone Roses : "Love Spreads"
6. Catatonia : "Mulder and Scully"
7. Suede : "Animal Nitrate"
8. Space : "Avenging Angels"
9. The Cardigans : "Lovefool"
10. Ash : "Goldfinger"
11. The Seahorses : "Love Is the Law"
12. Shed Seven : "Going for Gold"
13. Ian Brown : "My Star"
14. Cast : "Free Me"
15. Eels : "Novocaine for the Soul"
16. Primal Scream : "Loaded"
17. Cornershop : "Brimful of Asha"
18. The Prodigy : "Breathe"
19. Underworld : "Born Slippy .NUXX"
