= The Best... Album in the World...Ever! =

Compilation album series

Compilation album series by Various artists
- Labels: Circa Records; Virgin Records; EMI; Universal Music Recordings; Sony Music; (2019-present)

The Best... Album in the World...Ever! is a compilation album brand from Circa Records (trading under the 'strategic marketing' brand name of EMI Records/Virgin Records). It was the brainchild of marketer Stephen Pritchard at Virgin Records.

Usually the album's title is made of the main title, genre and maybe issue number (so albums would include The Best Ibiza Album in the World...Ever!, The Best Rock Album in the World...Ever! etc.). However, on a number of indie music collections, the genre aspect was replaced by a full list of artist names. Due to this, these were just normally listed as The Best Album in the World...Ever!, and featured many Britpop acts, as well as dance acts such as Chemical Brothers.

Although most albums use the Album in the World...Ever! suffix, some towards the late 1990s change the suffix to Anthems...Ever!, with a plural on the theme (example the album The Best Celtic Anthems...Ever!). Some even just use ...Ever! as a suffix (such as The Best TV Ads...Ever!)

Many of the albums in the series were compiled by Ashley Abram.

== History ==
The series started with The Best...Dance Album in the World...Ever! (1993) which was a success, spending four weeks at number one on the UK Compilation Chart and ending up as the third biggest selling compilation of the year. The Dance strand led to a fourteen volume subseries. Other successful subseries included Air Guitar, Sixties, Club Anthems and the aforementioned alternative rock Best...Album in the World Evers.

The Best Club Anthems...Ever!, featuring house, big beat, techno and electronica was released in 1997, and there have been 16 sequels. One difference from The Best Dance Album in the World..Ever! and The Best Club Anthems...Ever series is that Club Anthems originally had its tracks mixed, although this stopped beginning with 2003's Very Best Club Anthems release.

The Best Air Guitar Album in the World...Ever!, referred to in retrospect as Air Guitar I, released 5 November 2001, was compiled by Brian May. A sequel was released in November 2002 and another in November 2003, the latter proclaiming itself to be the last Air Guitar Album in the World...Ever!. Both sequels were again compiled by Brian May. In 2005, a 3CD The Best of the Best Air Guitar Album in the World...Ever! was released. Whilst Air Guitar III proclaimed to be the final volume, the liner notes written by May in The Best of the Best start with "OK, we lied."

Sometimes, the albums have captured a moment of popularity for things other than music, such as The Best TV Ads...Ever!, a compilation released in May 2000 of songs from current and famous TV adverts, which was released just days after the "100 Greatest TV Ads" poll from Channel 4 and The Sunday Times aired on the former. Furthermore, many other albums with a similar concept followed from other labels, including Switched On from rival label Telstar, Classic Ads from Universal, Commercial Breaks from Beechwood Music and the similarly titled Commercial Break from Castle Music.

The series was immensely popular, and most of the volumes performed well in the compilation charts, with some even making number one. The series started to become subject to popular culture parodies, such as spoof band Shirehorses titling their first album from 1997 The worst...album in the world...ever...EVER!. Blur, who appeared on some of the albums in the series, were originally going to title their 2000 compilation Blur: The Best of as Best Blur Album in the World Ever.

The series originally featured a globe on each album cover, to represent the world, as referred to in the album titles. When the Anthems...Ever! and the simply ...Ever! titles started to appear in 1997, the globe didn't usually appear on the cover. The globe continued to be featured on in the World...Ever! covers nonetheless, although in 2001–02, it started to become absent from the album covers of in the World...Ever! albums too, as it is absent from the Air Guitar covers and one of the Dance covers.

== List of compilations ==
=== Original series ===
Year	#	Title	Ref
1993	1	The Best Dance Album in the World... Ever! Part 1	
1993	2	The Best Dance Album in the World... Ever! Part 2	
1993	3	The Best Christmas... Ever!	
1994	4	The Best Country Album in the World... Ever!	
1994	5	The Best Rock 'n' Roll Album in the World... Ever!	
1994	6	The Best Rock Album in the World... Ever! Vol. 1	
1994	7	The Best Dance Album in the World... Ever! Vol. 3	
1994	8	The Best Dance Album in the World... Ever! Vol. 4	
1994	9	The Best Reggae Album in the World... Ever!	
1995	10	The Best... Album in the World... Ever! Vol. 1	
1995	11	The Best Punk Album in the World... Ever! Vol. 1	
1995	12	The Best Party Album in the World... Ever!	
1995	13	The Best Rock Album in the World... Ever! Vol. II	
1995	14	The Best Rock Ballads in the World... Ever! Vol. 1	
1995	15	The Best Dance Album in the World... 95!	
1995	16	The Best Dance Album in the World... Ever! Vol. 5	
1995	17	The Best Funk Album in the World... Ever! Vol. 1	
1995	18	The Best Sixties Album In The World...Ever!	
1996	19	The Best... Album in the World... Ever! Vol. 2	
1996	20	The Best... Album in the World... Ever! Vol. 3	
1996	21	The Best Opera Album in the World... Ever!	
1996	22	The Best Sixties Album in the World... Ever! Vol. II	
1996	23	The Best Rap Album in the World... Ever!	
1996	24	The Best Irish Album in the World... Ever!	
1996	25	The Best Christmas Album in the World...Ever!	
1996	26	The Best Swing Album in the World... Ever! Vol. I	
1996	27	The Best Swing Album in the World... Ever! Vol. II	
1996	28	The Best Punk Album in the World... Ever! Vol. 2	
1996	29	The Best Dance Album in the World... Ever! Vol. 6	
1996	30	The Best Jazz Album in the World... Ever!	
1996	31	The Best Footie Anthems in the World... Ever!	
1997	32	The Best... Album in the World... Ever! Vol. 5	
1997	33	The Best... Album in the World... Ever! Vol. 6	
1997	34	The Best... Anthems... Ever! Vol. 1	
1997	35	The Best... Anthems... Ever! Vol. 2	
1997	36	The Best Disco Album in the World... Ever! Vol. 1	
1997	37	The Best Sixties Album in the World... Ever! Vol. III	
1997	38	The Best Sixties Album in the World... Ever! Vol. IV	
1997	39	The Best Seventies Album in the World... Ever! Vol. 1	
1997	40	The Best Dance Album in the World... Ever! Vol. 7	
1997	41	The Best Rock Album in the World... Ever! Vol. 2	
1997	42	The Best Scottish Album in the World... Ever!	
1997	43	The Best Summer Album in the World... Ever!	
1997	44	Spice Girls Present... The Best Girl Power Album... Ever!	
1997	45	The Best Funk Album in the World... Ever! Vol. 2	
1998	46	The Best... Album in the World... Ever! Vol. 7	
1998	47	The Best... Anthems... Ever! Vol. 3	
1998	48	The Best Dance Album in the World... Ever! Vol. 8	
1998	49	The Best Disco Album in the World... Ever! Vol. 2	
1998	50	The Best Seventies Album in the World... Ever! Vol. 2	
1998	51	The Best Glam Rock Album in the World... Ever!	
1998	52	The Best Ska Album in the World... Ever!	
1998	53	The Best 90's Album in the World... Ever!	
1998	54	The Best Party Megamix Album in the World... Ever!	
1998	55	The Best Workout Album in the World... Ever!	
1998	56	The Best Girl Power Album in the World... Ever!	
1998	57	The Best Chart Hits Album in the World... Ever!	
1998	58	The Best Country Ballads in the World... Ever!	
1998	59	The Best Rock Anthems... Ever!	
1999	60	The Best... Anthems... Ever! Vol. 4	
1999	61	The Best Choral Album in the World... Ever!	
1999	62	The Best Blue Note Album in the World... Ever!	
1999	63	The Best Belly Dance Album in the World... Ever! Vol. 2	
1999	64	The Best Dance Album in the World... Ever! Vol. 9	
1999	65	The Best Classical Album of the Millennium... Ever!	
1999	66	The Best Sixties Love Album in the World... Ever!	
1999	67	The Best Pepsi Chart Album in the World... Ever! Vol. 1	
1999	68	The Best Latin Party Album in the World... Ever!	
1999	69	The Best ...and Friends Album in the World... Ever! Vol. 1	
1999	70	The Best Club Anthems 99... Ever!	
1999	71	The Best House Anthems... Ever!	
1999	72	The Best Love Songs... Ever!	
1999	73	The Best Celtic Anthems... Ever!	
1999	74	The Best Hip Hop Anthems... Ever!	
1999	75	The Most Relaxing Album in the World... Ever!	
1999	77	The Best Kid's Party in the World... Ever!	
1999	78	The Best 80s Album in the World... Ever!	
2000	79	The Best Dance Album in the World... Ever! Vol. 10	
2000	80	The Best Dance Album in the World... Ever! 2000	
2000	81	The Best Ibiza Anthems... Ever! 2k	
2000	82	The Best Latino Carnival Album in the World... Ever!	
2000	83	The Best Pepsi Chart Album in the World... Ever! 2000	
2000	84	The Best Proms Album in the World... Ever!	
2000	85	The Best Comedy Album in the World... Ever!	
2000	86	The Best Cuban Album in the World... Ever!	
2000	87	The Best Summer Holiday Album in the World... Ever!	
2000	88	The Best Arabic Album in the World... Ever!	
2000	89	The Best Arabic Love Album in the World... Ever!	
2000	90	The Best Easy Album in the World... Ever!	
2000	91	The Best Jukebox Album in the World... Ever!	
2000	92	The Best Pub Jukebox in the World... Ever!	
2000	93	The Best Christmas Album in the World... Ever! (new edition)	
2000	94	The Best Blues Album in the World... Ever!	
2000	95	The Best Trance Anthems... Ever!	
2000	96	The Best Club Anthems... Ever! 2k	
2000	97	The Best Mix... Ever!	
2000	98	The Best Millennium Party... Ever!	
2000	99	The Best TV Ads... Ever!	
2001	100	The Best Air Guitar Album in the World...Ever! Vol. I	
2001	101	The Best Dance Album in the World... Ever! Vol. 11	
2002	102	The Best Air Guitar Album in the World...Ever! Vol. II	
2002	103	The Best Dance Album in the World... Ever! 2002	
2002	104	The Best Arabian Nights Album in the World... Ever! Vol. 1	
2002	105	The Best Italian Album in the World... Ever!	
2003	106	The Best Air Guitar Album in the World...Ever! Vol. III	
2003	107	The Best Prog Rock Album in the World... Ever!	
2003	108	The Best Panpipes Album in the World... Ever!	
2003	109	The Best Arabian Nights Album in the World... Ever! Vol. 3	
2003	110	The Best Dance Album in the World... Ever! Vol. 13	
2003	111	The Best Tango Album in the World... Ever!	
2004	112	The Best Gregorian Chant Album In The World... Ever!	
2004	113	The Best Classical Album in the World... Ever!	
2004	114	The Best Line Dancing Album in the World... Ever!	
2004	115	The Best Folk Album in the World... Ever!	
2004	116	The Best Heavy Metal Album in the World... Ever!	
2004	117	The Best Latin Jazz Album in the World... Ever!	
2004	118	The Best Khaleeji Album in the World... Ever!	
2004	119	The Best Christmas Album in the World...Ever!	
2005	120	The Best Military Bands Album In The World... Ever!	
2005	121	The Best Gospel Album In The World... Ever!	
2005	122	The Best of the Best Air Guitar Albums in the World... Ever!	
2005	123	The Best Arabian Nights Album in the World... Ever! Vol. 4	
2005	124	The Best Arabian Nights Album in the World... Ever! Vol. 5	
2006	125	The Best Disney Album in the World... Ever!	
2006	126	The Best Arabian Nights Album in the World... Ever! Vol. 6	
2006	127	The Best Baroque Album in the World... Ever!	
2006	128	The Best ...and Friends Album in the World... Ever! Vol. 2	
2007	129	The Best Kids Xmas Album in the World... Ever!	
2007	130	The Best Karaoke Album in the World... Ever!	
2007	131	The Best Unofficial Footie Anthems... Ever!	
2008	132	The Best Arabian Nights Album in the World... Ever! Vol. 7	

=== Revival series (2019-present) ===
After a few years of the series being dormant, Spectrum Music, a budget label owned by Universal Music Operations, in collaboration with Sony Music, started to regularly release 3-CD compilations under the Best... Album in the World...Ever! name as a companion to the revived The Hits Album series in 2019.

Title	Release date	Peak chart position	Notes
Title	Release date	UK Compilations	Notes
The Best Country Album in the World...Ever!	31 May 2019	3	
The Best Soul Album in the World...Ever!	31 May 2019	8	
The Best Movie Hits Album in the World...Ever!	31 May 2019	9	
The Best Electronic Album in the World...Ever!	13 September 2019	2	
The Best Dance Album in the World...Ever!	13 September 2019	5	
The Best 80s Groove Album in the World...Ever!	13 September 2019	6	
The Best 70s Album in the World...Ever!	15 November 2019	8	
The Best Disco Album in the World...Ever!	22 November 2019	15	
The Best American Legends Album in the World...Ever!	28 February 2020	4	
The Best 80s Album in the World...Ever!	15 May 2020	9	
The Best British Legends Album in the World...Ever!	15 May 2020	19	
The Best Indie Album in the World...Ever!	8 July 2020	9	
The Best R&B Album in the World...Ever!	24 July 2020	12	
The Best Late Nite Album in the World...Ever!	14 August 2020	15	
The Best Driving Album in the World...Ever!	23 October 2020	14	
The Best 80s Car Songs Album in the World...Ever!	5 February 2021	3	
The Best Summer Holiday Album in the World...Ever!	18 June 2021	3	
The Best 90s Album in the World...Ever!	20 August 2021	8	
The Cosiest Christmas Album in the World...Ever!	29 October 2021	7	Contains a bonus disc featuring Christmas carols performed by the Choir of Trinity College, Cambridge.
The Best 70s Party Album in the World...Ever!	26 November 2021	10	
The Best 60s Album in the World...Ever!	28 January 2022	9	
The Best 80s Car Songs Album in the World...Ever! Rides Again	18 March 2022	11	
The Coolest Album in the World Ever!	3 June 2022	15	
The Best Jukebox Classics Album in the World...Ever!	3 February 2023	10	
The Best 80s Car Songs Album in the World...Ever! Sing Along	10 February 2023	15	
The Best 70s Rock Album in the World...Ever!	24 March 2023	10	
The Best 60s & 70s Soul Album in the World...Ever!	19 May 2023	10	
The Best Summer Time Album in the World...Ever!	23 June 2023	11	
The Best Car Songs Album in the World...Ever!	14 July 2023	14	
The Best 80s Rock Album in the World...Ever!	15 September 2023	12	
The Best Disco Party Album in the World...Ever!	10 November 2023	23	
The Best 80s Soul Album in the World...Ever!	5 January 2024	14	
The Best R&B Classics Album in the World...Ever!	9 February 2024	17	
The Best Northern Soul Album in the World...Ever!	29 March 2024	8	Abridged version released as a vinyl double LP entitled Northern Soul Classics.
The Best Pop Album in the World...Ever!	19 April 2024	20	
The Best 80s Movies Album in the World...Ever!	17 May 2024	11	
The Best Power Ballads Album in the World...Ever!	12 July 2024	10	
The Best Number 1s Album in the World...Ever!	6 September 2024	11	
The Best 80s Party Album in the World...Ever!	15 November 2024	13	
The Best Country Classics Album in the World...Ever!	7 February 2025	12	
The Best 80s US Album in the World...Ever!	21 March 2025	11	
The Best Northern Soul Album in the World...Ever! Volume II: Back to the Floor	13 June 2025	21	Abridged version released as a vinyl double LP entitled Northern Soul Classics: Volume 2.
The Best 80s Funk, Soul and Groove Album in the World...Ever!	18 July 2025	17	
The Best Soft Rock Album in the World...Ever!	15 August 2025	14	
The Best Number 1s Album in the World...Ever! More Chart-Toppers	12 September 2025	28	
The Best Love Songs Album in the World...Ever!	9 January 2026	15	
The Best Easy Pop Album in the World...Ever! 60s & 70s	13 February 2026	6	
The Best Car Songs Album in the World...Ever! The #1s Collection	4 September 2026	4	

== Albums ==
=== The Best... Album in the World... Ever! ===
These albums have the genre of indie/alternative music.

These albums finished in 1998, although the series was picked up again in 2001 under a new name, The Album:.

The brand new The Album: series spawned six more volumes (although a hiatus was present in two of its five active years)

==== Volume 1 (1995) ====
VTDCD 58

===== Disc 1 =====
1. Supergrass – "Alright"
2. Blur – "Girls and Boys"
3. Elastica – "Waking Up"
4. Ash – "Girl From Mars"
5. Oasis – "Whatever"
6. Edwyn Collins – "A Girl Like You"
7. The Charlatans – "The Only One I Know"
8. Pulp – "Do You Remember the First Time?"
9. McAlmont & Butler – "Yes"
10. Morrissey – "Everyday Is Like Sunday"
11. Radiohead – "High and Dry"
12. The Cranberries – "Zombie"
13. The Smashing Pumpkins – "Today"
14. Manic Street Preachers – "La Tristesse Durera (Scream to a Sigh)"
15. James – "Sit Down"
16. The Boo Radleys – "Wake Up Boo!"
17. Suede – "Animal Nitrate"
18. The Verve – "This Is Music"
19. Inspiral Carpets – "I Want You"
20. Therapy? – "Screamager"

===== Disc 2 =====
1. The Smiths – "This Charming Man"
2. The Jesus & Mary Chain – "April Skies"
3. Oasis – "Supersonic"
4. The Stone Roses – "Fools Gold" (Original version)
5. Stereo MC's – "Connected"
6. The Prodigy – "Out of Space"
7. The Shamen – "Destination Eschaton" (Beatmasters 7" remix)
8. New Order – "True Faith '94"
9. The Chemical Brothers – "Leave Home"
10. Fluke – "Bullet"
11. Primal Scream – "Loaded"
12. EMF – "Unbelievable"
13. Jesus Jones – "Real, Real, Real"
14. Depeche Mode – "Personal Jesus" (7" version)
15. Blur – "Chemical World"
16. The Levellers – "15 Years"
17. The Auteurs – "Lenny Valentino"
18. Skunk Anansie – "I Can Dream"
19. Dreadzone – "Captain Dread"
20. The Future Sound of London – "Lifeforms (Path 4) (radio edit)"

- There are 28 credited artists in the full title of the album.

==== Volume 2 (1996) ====
VTDCD 76

===== Disc 1 =====
1. Oasis – "Wonderwall"
2. Paul Weller – "Wild Wood"
3. Radiohead – "Creep"
4. Cast – "Fine Time"
5. Pulp – "Common People"
6. The Lightning Seeds – "The Life of Riley"
7. Blur – "Parklife"
8. Saint Etienne – "He's on the Phone"
9. Sleeper – "What Do I Do Now?"
10. The Levellers – "Hope Street"
11. Supergrass – "Caught by the Fuzz"
12. Whale – "Hobo Humpin' Slobo Babe"
13. Ash – "Angel Interceptor"
14. Lush – "Single Girl"
15. Elastica – "Connection"
16. Garbage – "Queer"
17. The Stone Roses – "She Bangs the Drums"
18. New Order – "Blue Monday"
19. The Smiths – "How Soon Is Now?"
20. Gene – "Olympian"

===== Disc 2 =====
1. Björk – "It's Oh So Quiet"
2. Dreadzone – "Little Britain"
3. Blur – "Country House"
4. The Wonder Stuff – "The Size of a Cow"
5. Menswear – "Stardust"
6. Oasis – "Cigarettes & Alcohol"
7. Happy Mondays – "Kinky Afro"
8. Primal Scream – "Movin' on Up"
9. Morrissey – "The More You Ignore Me, the Closer I Get"
10. The Verve – "History"
11. Suede – "Stay Together"
12. The Charlatans – "Just When You're Thinkin' Things Over"
13. The Jesus & Mary Chain – "Far Gone and Out"
14. Echobelly – "Great Things"
15. The Wannadies – "Might Be Stars"
16. Skunk Anansie – "Weak"
17. The Chemical Brothers – "Life is Sweet"
18. Fluke – "Tosh"
19. Massive Attack – "Protection"
20. McAlmont & Butler – "You Do"

- There are 28 credited artists in the full title of the album.

==== Volume 3 (1996) ====
VTDCD 084

===== Disc 1 =====
1. The Prodigy – "Firestarter"
2. Leftfield/Lydon – "Open Up"
3. Iggy Pop – "Lust for Life"
4. Supergrass – "Going Out"
5. Oasis – "Don't Look Back in Anger"
6. Cast – "Sandstorm"
7. Ocean Colour Scene – "You've Got It Bad"
8. Garbage – "Stupid Girl"
9. The Lightning Seeds – "Pure"
10. The Stone Roses – "What The World Is Waiting For"
11. Radiohead – "Street Spirit (Fade Out)"
12. Dubstar – "Stars"
13. Blur – "The Universal"
14. St. Etienne – "Only Love Can Break Your Heart"
15. New Order – "Temptation"
16. The Levellers – "This Garden"
17. The Charlatans – "Weirdo"
18. Ash – "Kung Fu"
19. Underworld – "Born Slippy"

===== Disc 2 =====
1. Paul Weller – "The Changingman"
2. Oasis – "Round Are Way"
3. Happy Mondays – "Step On"
4. Sleeper – "Inbetweener"
5. Lush – "Ladykillers"
6. Terrorvision – "Perseverance"
7. Goldbug – "Whole Lotta Love"
8. Babylon Zoo – "Spaceman"
9. Menswear – "Sleeping In"
10. Marion – "Time"
11. Echobelly – "King of the Kerb"
12. Pulp – "My Legendary Girlfriend"
13. Elastica – "Stutter"
14. Skunk Anansie – "Selling Jesus"
15. The Chemical Brothers – "Chemical Beats" (Dave Clarke Remix)
16. 60ft Dolls – "Stay"
17. Teenage Fanclub – "Sparky's Dream"
18. Gene – "For the Dead"
19. Dreadzone – "Life Love & Unity"
20. Massive Attack – "Sly"

- Although the Dave Clarke remix of "Chemical Beats" is featured, this is only mentioned in the booklet, and the back cover just simply lists "Chemical Beats" without mention of the remix.
- There are 28 credited artists in the full title of the album.

==== Volume 4 (1996) ====
VTDCD 096

===== Disc 1 =====
1. Oasis – "Some Might Say"
2. Cast – "Alright"
3. Ocean Colour Scene – "The Day We Caught the Train"
4. Manic Street Preachers – "A Design for Life"
5. Suede – "Trash"
6. Ash – "Goldfinger"
7. Sleeper – "Sale of the Century"
8. Dodgy – "In a Room"
9. Lightning Seeds – "Sense"
10. Space – "Female of the Species"
11. The Charlatans – "One to Another"
12. The Chemical Brothers – "Loops of Fury"
13. Underworld – "Born Slippy"
14. The Prodigy – "No Good (Start The Dance)"
15. Björk – "Army of Me"
16. Goldie – "Inner City Life"
17. Everything but the Girl – "Walking Wounded"
18. Stereo MC's – "Step It Up"
19. Dubstar – "Not So Manic Now"

===== Disc 2 =====
1. Paul Weller – "Sunflower"
2. R.E.M. – "Orange Crush"
3. The Smiths – "Panic"
4. Blur – "Charmless Man"
5. Radiohead – "Just"
6. The Presidents of the United States of America – "Peaches"
7. Rocket from the Crypt – "On a Rope"
8. Skunk Anansie – "All I Want"
9. The Stone Roses – "Love Spreads"
10. Garbage – "Only Happy When It Rains"
11. Ash – "Oh Yeah"
12. Babybird – "You're Gorgeous"
13. Super Furry Animals – "If You Don't Want Me to Destroy You"
14. Longpigs – "Far"
15. Mansun – "Stripper Vicar"
16. Shed Seven – "Where Have You Been Tonight"
17. The Levellers – "Just the One"
18. Placebo – "Teenage Angst"
19. Massive Attack – "Safe from Harm"
20. Sneaker Pimps – "6 Underground"
21. Oasis – "The Masterplan"

- There are 26 artists credited in the full title of the album.

==== Volume 5 (1997) ====
1. Pulp – "Sorted for Es and Wizz"
2. Kula Shaker – "Tattva"
3. Oasis – "Live Forever"
4. Manic Street Preachers – "Everything Must Go"
5. Blur – "Beetlebum"
6. Placebo – "Nancy Boy"
7. Apollo 440 – "Ain't Talkin' 'bout Dub"
8. The Prodigy – "Breathe"
9. Fun Lovin' Criminals – "Scooby Snacks"
10. Mansun – "Wide Open Space"
11. Depeche Mode – "Barrel of a Gun"
12. Garbage – "Milk"
13. Skunk Anansie – "Hedonism (Just Because You Feel Good)"
14. Suede – "Beautiful Ones"
15. The Supernaturals – "The Day Before Yesterday's Man"
16. Bennet – "Mum's Gone to Iceland"
17. Sleeper – "Nice Guy Eddie"
18. Shed Seven – "Getting Better"
19. The Presidents of the United States of America – "Lump"
20. Geneva – "Into the Blue"
21. Underworld – "Pearl's Girl"
22. Paul Weller – "Out of the Sinking"
23. Oasis – "Roll with It"
24. Ocean Colour Scene – "The Riverboat Song"
25. R.E.M. – "What's the Frequency Kenneth"
26. Deep Purple – "Hush"
27. Cast – "Flying"
28. Space – "Dark Clouds"
29. The Lightning Seeds – "Lucky You"
30. The La's – "There She Goes"
31. Dodgy – "Good Enough"
32. White Town – "Your Woman"
33. Babybird – "Candy Girl"
34. 808 State and James Dean Bradfield – "Lopez"
35. The Aloof – "One Night Stand"
36. Radiohead – "Fake Plastic Trees"
37. Longpigs – "Lost Myself"
38. Terrorvision – "Easy"
39. The Stone Roses – "I Am the Resurrection"
- There are 22 credited artists in the full title of the album.

==== Volume 6 (1997) ====
1. Radiohead – "Paranoid Android"
2. Blur – "Song 2"
3. Supergrass – "Richard III"
4. Foo Fighters – "This Is a Call"
5. eels – "Novocaine for the Soul"
6. The Charlatans – "North Country Boy"
7. Cast – "Free Me"
8. Manic Street Preachers – "Australia"
9. Kula Shaker – "Hey Dude"
10. Pulp – "Disco 2000"
11. Monaco – "What Do You Want from Me"
12. The Supernaturals – "Smile"
13. John Lydon – "Sun"
14. 3 Colours Red – "Copper Girl"
15. Fun Lovin' Criminals – "King of New York"
16. Sneaker Pimps – "6 Underground"
17. Depeche Mode – "Home"
18. Primal Scream – "Star"
19. Skunk Anansie – "Brazen (Weep)"
20. The Chemical Brothers – "Setting Sun"
21. Republica – "Ready to Go"
22. Reef – "Place Your Hands"
23. Bush – "Swallowed"
24. Teenage Fanclub – "Ain't That Enough"
25. The Stone Roses – "Made of Stone"
26. Suede – "Lazy"
27. Ether – "If You Really Want to Know"
28. Geneva – "Tranquilizer"
29. Mansun – "She Makes My Nose Bleed"
30. Embrace – "The Last Gas"
31. Ben Folds Five – "Battle of Who Could Care Less"
32. My Life Story – "Strumpet"
33. Hurricane#1 – "Just Another Illusion"
34. Placebo – "Bruise Pristine"
35. Kenickie – "Punka"
36. The Future Sound of London – "We Have Explosive"
37. Fluke – "Absurd"
38. Super Furry Animals – "Hermann Loves Pauline"
39. The Verve – "On Your Own"
40. Dodgy – "Staying Out for the Summer"
- There are 25 credited artists in the title.

==== Volume 7 (1998) ====
===== Disc 1 =====
1. The Verve – "Sonnet"
2. Embrace – "Come Back to What You Know"
3. Radiohead – "Karma Police"
4. Space – "Begin Again"
5. The Dandy Warhols – "Not If You Were the Last Junkie on Earth"
6. Fatboy Slim – "The Rockafeller Skank"
7. Iggy Pop – "The Passenger"
8. Primal Scream – "Rocks"
9. Brock Landars – "S.M.D.U."
10. Chumbawamba – "Tubthumping"
11. Robbie Williams – "Let Me Entertain You"
12. Supergrass – "Sun Hits the Sky"
13. The Charlatans – "How High"
14. Skunk Anansie – "Twisted (Everyday Hurts)"
15. The Stone Roses – "What The World Is Waiting For"
16. Blur – "On Your Own"
17. The Pixies – "Monkey Gone to Heaven"
18. Catherine Wheel – "Delicious"
19. Kenickie – "I Would Fix You"
20. Ether – "Best Friend"

===== Disc 2 =====
1. Mansun – "Wide Open Space" (Pefecto remix)
2. PF Project feat. Ewan McGregor – "Choose Life"
3. Run-D.M.C. vs. Jason Nevins – "It's Like That"
4. Collapsed Lung – "Eat My Goal"
5. Garbage – "Push It"
6. The Levellers – "What a Beautiful Day"
7. Ocean Colour Scene – "Hundred Mile High City"
8. Fat Les – "Vindaloo"
9. The Prodigy – "Poison"
10. Whale – "Four Big Speakers"
11. Bentley Rhythm Ace – "Bentley's Gonna Sort You Out"
12. Lo Fidelity Allstars – "Vision Incision"
13. Air – "Kelly Watch the Stars"
14. Bran Van 3000 – "Drinking in LA"
15. Massive Attack – "Teardrop"
16. Unbelievable Truth – "Settle Down"
17. Cornershop – "Brimful of Asha"
18. Super Furry Animals – "Ice Hockey Hair"

- Unusual for compilation albums, the "Brimful of Asha" featured on disc two is the original version, not the Norman Cook remix which reached #1 in the UK charts.
- The band Air are credited as Air French Band.
- There are 16 credited artists in the full title of the album.
- This volume features repeats of songs featured in previous volumes from the series; The Stone Roses' "What The World Is Waiting For" featured on Volume 3, and Mansun's "Wide Open Space" featured on Volume 5, although the version of "Wide Open Space" here is a remix by Paul Oakenfold.

=== The Best Funk Album in the World...Ever! ===
This is a double tape or CD compilation of 1970s funk and blaxploitation soundtrack music. The album is a de facto follow up to the EMI/Virgin release Superfunk though it was decided to list the album under the stronger Best..Ever brand name.

The concept of the album is similar to the Harmless collections and to BMG Global TV's Blaxplotation album series.

=== The Best Christmas Album in the World... Ever! ===
This is a double CD album of various Christmas music, originally released in 1996. In 2000, a new edition was released, The Best Christmas Album in the World... Ever! (new edition).

==== 1996 Edition ====
===== Disc One =====
1. "Happy Xmas (War Is Over)" – John Lennon & Yoko Ono
2. "Wonderful Christmastime" – Paul McCartney
3. "I Wish It Could Be Christmas Every Day" – Wizzard
4. "Merry Xmas Everybody" – Slade
5. "Do They Know It's Christmas?" – Band Aid
6. "Fairytale of New York" – The Pogues featuring Kirsty MacColl
7. "I Believe in Father Christmas" – Greg Lake
8. "2000 Miles" – Pretenders
9. "A Spaceman Came Travelling" – Chris De Burgh
10. "The Power of Love" – Frankie Goes to Hollywood
11. "Driving Home for Christmas" – Chris Rea
12. "Step into Christmas" – Elton John
13. "Merry Christmas Everyone" – Shakin' Stevens
14. "Another Rock and Roll Christmas" – Gary Glitter
15. "Little Saint Nick" – The Beach Boys
16. "Santa Claus Is Coming to Town" – Jackson 5
17. "In Dulce Jubilo" – Mike Oldfield
18. "Stop the Cavalry" – Jona Lewie
19. "Christmas Wrapping" – The Waitresses
20. "Ring Out, Solstice Bells" – Jethro Tull
21. "Peace on Earth/Little Drummer Boy" – David Bowie/Bing Crosby

===== Disc Two =====
1. "White Christmas" – Bing Crosby
2. "The Christmas Song" – Nat 'King' Cole
3. "Let It Snow, Let It Snow, Let It Snow" – Dean Martin
4. "Mary's Boy Child" – Harry Belafonte
5. "When a Child is Born" – Johnny Mathis
6. "Mistletoe and Wine" – Cliff Richard
7. "Walking in the Air" – Aled Jones
8. "I Believe" – Robson & Jerome
9. "Winter Wonderland" – Doris Day
10. "Lonely Pup (In a Christmas Shop)" – Adam Faith
11. "Rockin' Around the Christmas Tree" – Mel & Kim
12. "Last Christmas" – State of the Heart
13. "Happy Holiday" – Andy Williams
14. "Santa Baby" – Eartha Kitt
15. "Lonely This Christmas" – Mud
16. "Pretty Paper" – Roy Orbison
17. "Silver Bells" – Jim Reeves
18. "God Rest Ye Merry Gentlemen" – Perry Como
19. "We Wish You a Merry Christmas" – The Weavers
20. "The Twelve Days of Christmas" – The Spinners
21. "Gaudete" – Steeleye Span
22. "In the Bleak Midwinter" – Bert Jansch
23. "What Are You Doing New Year's Eve" – Mary Margaret O'Hara (Frank Loesser)

==== 2000 New Edition ====
===== Disc One =====
1. "Happy Xmas (War Is Over)" – John Lennon & Yoko Ono
2. "Wonderful Christmastime" – Paul McCartney
3. "I Wish It Could Be Christmas Every Day" – Wizzard
4. "Merry Xmas Everybody" – Slade
5. "Do They Know It's Christmas?" – Band Aid
6. "I Believe in Father Christmas" – Greg Lake
7. "A Spaceman Came Travelling" – Chris De Burgh
8. "The Power of Love" – Frankie Goes to Hollywood
9. "Angels" – Robbie Williams
10. "Baby, It's Cold Outside" – Tom Jones with Cerys Matthews from Catatonia
11. "Saviour's Day" – Cliff Richard
12. "Step into Christmas" – Elton John
13. "Sleigh Ride" – Spice Girls
14. "Little Saint Nick" – The Beach Boys
15. "Santa Claus Is Coming to Town" – Jackson 5
16. "In Dulci Jubilo" – Mike Oldfield
17. "Stop the Cavalry" – Jona Lewie
18. "Christmas Wrapping" – The Waitresses
19. "Ring Out, Solstice Bells" – Jethro Tull
20. "The Millennium Prayer" – Cliff Richard

===== Disc Two =====
1. "White Christmas" – Bing Crosby
2. "The Christmas Song" – Nat 'King' Cole
3. "Let It Snow, Let It Snow, Let It Snow" – Dean Martin
4. "Mary's Boy Child" – Matt Monro
5. "Mistletoe and Wine" – Cliff Richard
6. "Walking in the Air" – Aled Jones
7. "Winter Wonderland" – Doris Day
8. "Lonely Pup (In a Christmas Shop)" – Adam Faith
9. "Rockin' Around the Christmas Tree" – Mel & Kim
10. "Last Christmas" – State of the Heart
11. "Little Town" – Cliff Richard
12. "Frosty the Snowman" – Nat 'King' Cole
13. "Rudolph the Red-Nosed Reindeer" – Dean Martin
14. "Lonely This Christmas" – Mud
15. "God Rest Ye Merry Gentlemen" – Ella Fitzgerald
16. "Deck the Halls" – Treorchy, Morriston Orpheus & Pontarddulais Male Choirs with the Band of the Welsh Guards
17. "Have Yourself a Merry Little Christmas" – Jane McDonald
18. "We Wish You a Merry Christmas" – The Weavers
19. "The Twelve Days of Christmas" – The Spinners
20. "Gaudete" – Steeleye Span
21. "Silent Night, Holy Night" – Sinéad O'Connor
22. "In the Bleak Midwinter" – Bert Jansch
23. "Peace on Earth/Little Drummer Boy" – David Bowie/Bing Crosby
24. "What Are You Doing New Year's Eve" – Mary Margaret O'Hara (Frank Loesser)

=== The Best...Anthems...Ever! ===
A 2-CD compilation released in 1997.

==== Disc 1 ====
1. "Tubthumping" – Chumbawamba
2. "Parklife" – Blur
3. "Love Is the Law" – The Seahorses
4. "North Country Boy" – The Charlatans
5. "The Day We Caught the Train" – Ocean Colour Scene
6. "Alright" – Supergrass
7. "Tattva" – Kula Shaker
8. "Place Your Hands" – Reef
9. "Creep" – Radiohead
10. "Swallowed" – Bush
11. "Scooby Snacks" – Fun Lovin' Criminals
12. "This Is a Call" – Foo Fighters
13. "Nancy Boy" – Placebo
14. "Breathe" – The Prodigy
15. "Girl From Mars" – Ash
16. "Weak" – Skunk Anansie
17. "You Love Us" – Manic Street Preachers
18. "Block Rockin' Beats" – The Chemical Brothers
19. "Born Slippy" – Underworld
20. "Open Up" – Leftfield/Lydon

==== Disc 2 ====
1. "The Drugs Don't Work" – The Verve
2. "Street Spirit (Fade Out)" – Radiohead
3. "There She Goes" – The La's
4. "Stupid Girl" – Garbage
5. "Disco 2000" – Pulp
6. "Trash" – Suede
7. "Sit Down" – James
8. "Alright – Cast
9. "Life of Riley" – The Lightning Seeds
10. "The Changingman" – Paul Weller
11. "Novocaine for the Soul" – eels
12. "Peaches" – The Presidents of the United States of America
13. "Fools Gold" – The Stone Roses
14. "Hope Street" – The Levellers
15. "Yes" – McAlmont and Butler
16. "Wide Open Space" – Mansun
17. "'Heroes'" – David Bowie
18. "Song 2" – Blur
19. "Caught by the Fuzz" – Supergrass
20. "Lust for Life" – Iggy Pop
21. "Choose Life" – PF Project Feat. Ewan McGregor

=== The Best Air Guitar Album in the World...Ever! ===
These were a series of albums compiled by Brian May from Queen that ran from 2001 to 2005. Despite the first volume only entering at #5, it achieved at least Gold status, whilst the second volume received Platinum status.

==== Volume 1 (2001) ====
The first volume was released 5 November 2001, and entered the compilations charts at #5. It featured twenty tracks on CD1 and twenty one on CD2. It opens with an exclusive version of the Queen song "Tie Your Mother Down" subtitled "(Air Guitar Edit)", which features a different intro (a snippet of the song "We Will Rock You") than the original version (which was sometimes credited separately from the song). Also on the album was another Queen song, "Bohemian Rhapsody", the four-minute edit of the Lynyrd Skynyrd song "Freebird", and many other songs, including a rare appearance from The Jimi Hendrix Experience.

===== Disc 1 =====
1. Queen – "Tie Your Mother Down (Air Guitar Edit)"
2. Deep Purple – "Smoke on the Water"
3. Blur – "Song 2"
4. Run DMC – "Walk This Way"
5. Derek & the Dominos – "Layla"
6. The Kinks – "You Really Got Me"
7. Rainbow – "Since You Been Gone"
8. Def Leppard – "Photograph"
9. The Troggs – "Wild Thing"
10. David Bowie – "Rebel Rebel"
11. Jeff Beck, Terry Bozzio and Tony Hymas – "Where Were You"
12. Joe Walsh – "Rocky Mountain Way"
13. Dire Straits – "Sultans of Swing"
14. The Surfaris – "Wipe Out"
15. Foo Fighters – "Monkey Wrench"
16. Thin Lizzy – "The Boys Are Back in Town"
17. Black Sabbath – "Paranoid"
18. Joe Satriani – "Surfing with the Alien"
19. Status Quo – "Whatever You Want"
20. Lynyrd Skynyrd – "Free Bird (4-minute version)"

===== Disc 2 =====
1. The Jimi Hendrix Experience – "Voodoo Chile"
2. The Who – "My Generation"
3. T-Rex – "20th Century Boy"
4. Paul McCartney – "All Shook Up"
5. Chuck Berry – "Johnny B Goode"
6. Weezer – "Hash Pipe"
7. The Shadows – "Apache"
8. Motörhead – "Ace of Spades"
9. Eddie Cochran – "Summertime Blues"
10. Free – "All Right Now"
11. Robbie Williams – "Let Me Entertain You"
12. Fleetwood Mac – "Oh Well"
13. Metallica – "For Whom the Bell Tolls"
14. ZZ Top – "Gimme All Your Lovin'"
15. Boston – "More Than a Feeling"
16. Cream – "Crossroads"
17. Status Quo – "Down Down"
18. Bad Company – "Can't Get Enough"
19. Whitesnake – "Here I Go Again ('87 Remix)"
20. Wheatus – "Teenage Dirtbag"
21. Queen - "Bohemian Rhapsody"

==== Volume 2 (2002) ====
After the success of volume 1, the second volume was released November 2002. Like volume 1, there was an exclusive on the album: Brian May's cover of "God Save the Queen" recorded on top of Buckingham Palace in 2002. Also featured was Queen's "One Vision" and many pop punk and nu metal songs which were fairly recent at the time of release. Brian May had help in compiling the album from several other musicians, alongside Ashley Abram (who normally compiles all The Best...Ever! series).

===== Disc 1 =====
1. Queen – "One Vision"
2. Bryan Adams – "Run to You"
3. Robert Palmer – "Addicted to Love"
4. Def Leppard – "Pour Some Sugar on Me"
5. Billy Idol – "Rebel Yell"
6. Alien Ant Farm – "Smooth Criminal"
7. Beastie Boys – "(You Gotta) Fight for Your Right (To Party)"
8. The Clash – "Should I Stay Or Should I Go"
9. The Ventures – "Walk, Don't Run"
10. The Kinks – "All Day and All of the Night"
11. Thin Lizzy – "Jailbreak"
12. Sweet – "Action"
13. Iron Maiden – "Run to the Hills"
14. Sum 41 – "Fat Lip"
15. Love Sculpture – "Sabre Dance"
16. Focus – "Hocus Pocus"
17. Status Quo – "Paper Plane"
18. The Cult – "She Sells Sanctuary"
19. The Undertones – "Teenage Kicks"
20. The Hives – "Hate to Say I Told You So"

===== Disc 2 =====
1. The Who – "Pinball Wizard"
2. Cream – "Sunshine of Your Love"
3. Deep Purple – "Black Night"
4. Steppenwolf – "Born to Be Wild"
5. Alice Cooper – "School's Out"
6. ZZ Top – "Sharp Dressed Man"
7. Status Quo – "Roll Over Lay Down"
8. Rainbow – "All Night Long"
9. David Bowie – "The Jean Genie"
10. Nickelback – "How You Remind Me"
11. Stiltskin – "Inside"
12. The Knack – "My Sharona"
13. Toto (band) – "Hold the Line"
14. The Cougars – "Saturday Nite at the Duck Pond"
15. Eddie Cochran - C'mon Everybody
16. The Shadows – "F.B.I."
17. Bert Weedon – "Guitar Boogie Shuffle"
18. Buddy Holly & the Crickets – "That'll Be the Day"
19. Free – "Wishing Well"
20. Pink Floyd – "Another Brick in the Wall (Part 2)"
21. Gary Moore – "Parisienne Walkways (Live)"
22. Brian May, Roger Taylor, Ray Cooper and the Royal Academy of Music Symphony Orchestra - "God Save the Queen"

==== Volume 3 (2003) ====
Volume 3 was released November 2003. Intended to be "the last Air guitar album in the world... ever!" according to the liner notes, there was later a "best of the best" album. Volume 3 featured a rare recording of the Pink Floyd song "Have a Cigar" by the Foo Fighters with Brian May. Queen's "Now I'm Here" also featured. The liner notes feature small quotes about each song/artist by May. Volumes 1 & 2 also did this, but focused mainly on the guitarist, rather than the song.

===== Disc 1 =====
1. Queen – "Now I'm Here"
2. Bryan Adams – "Summer of '69"
3. Billy Idol – "White Wedding"
4. Def Leppard – "Armageddon It"
5. EMF – "Unbelievable"
6. Red Hot Chili Peppers – "Higher Ground"
7. Cream – "Badge"
8. Status Quo – "Caroline"
9. Spin Doctors – "Two Princes"
10. The Shadows – "Man of Mystery"
11. Robert Palmer – "Bad Case of Lovin' You"
12. Bill Haley and His Comets – "Rock Around the Clock"
13. Eddie Cochran – "Somethin' Else"
14. The Animals – "House of the Rising Sun"
15. Chad Kroeger and Josey Scott – "Hero"
16. Thin Lizzy – "Don't Believe a Word"
17. Gary Moore – "Still Got the Blues (For You)"
18. The Jam – "Going Underground"
19. Rush – "Spirit of Radio"
20. Blink-182 – "All the Small Things"
21. Whitesnake – "Fool for Your Loving"
22. Slade – "Cum On Feel the Noize"

===== Disc 2 =====
1. Van Halen – "Eruption"
2. The Who – "I Can't Explain"
3. Prince – "Let's Go Crazy"
4. Electric Six – "Gay Bar"
5. Avril Lavigne – "Unwanted"
6. R.E.M. – "The One I Love"
7. David Bowie – "Suffragette City"
8. Foo Fighters featuring Brian May – "Have a Cigar"
9. The Yardbirds – "Over Under Sideways Down"
10. Bad Company – "Feel Like Makin' Love"
11. Puddle of Mudd – "Blurry"
12. The Offspring – "Pretty Fly (For a White Guy)"
13. Sweet – "Ballroom Blitz"
14. Chuck Berry – "No Particular Place to Go"
15. Duane Eddy - Peter Gunn Theme
16. Yngwie Malmsteen – "Vengeance"
17. Lynyrd Skynyrd – "Sweet Home Alabama"
18. REO Speedwagon – "Back on the Road Again"
19. Judas Priest – "Living After Midnight"
20. George Thorogood and the Destroyers – "Bad to the Bone"
21. Girlschool & Motörhead – "Please Don't Touch"
22. ZZ Top - "Tush"

==== US repackage of Volume 1 (2003) ====
In 2003, the success of Volume 1 meant the album was released in the US by Hollywood Records. It was given the new name World's Greatest Air Guitar Album. The album cover featured the same image, but was moved, alongside the new album text.

==== Volumes I & II (2003) ====
Following the success of Volume 2, Volumes 1 and 2 were compiled into a box set, released in the same original CD boxes, but a slipcase had been placed over them displaying new artwork. The cover subtitles the set 4 CD Deluxe Limited Edition.

==== Best of the Best (2005) ====
In 2005, the series returned with a 3-CD album titled The Best of the Best Air Guitar Albums in the World Ever. Due to the fact volume 3 claimed to be the last volume, the liner notes (written by Brian May) note "OK, we lied". Most of the songs had already appeared on volumes 1, 2 & 3, but there were some which didn't, such as The Darkness' "I Believe in a Thing Called Love" and an exclusive Queen + Paul Rodgers live performance of "Fat Bottomed Girls".

===== Disc 1 =====
1. Queen + Paul Rodgers – "Fat Bottomed Girls (Live)"
2. The Darkness – "I Believe in a Thing Called Love"
3. Van Halen – "Ain't Talkin' 'Bout Love"
4. Kiss – "Crazy Crazy Nights"
5. Robert Palmer – "Addicted to Love"
6. Run DMC – "Walk This Way"
7. Thin Lizzy – "The Boys Are Back in Town"
8. Iron Maiden – "Run to the Hills"
9. Motörhead – "Ace of Spades"
10. The Shadows – "Apache"
11. The Kinks – "You Really Got Me"
12. Bad Company – "Feel Like Makin' Love"
13. Deep Purple – "Smoke on the Water"
14. Free – "Wishing Well"
15. Rainbow – "Since You Been Gone"
16. Cream – "Sunshine of Your Love"
17. Lynyrd Skynyrd - "Free"

===== Disc 2 =====
1. Dire Straits – "Sultans of Swing"
2. The Police – "Message in a Bottle"
3. The Allman Brothers Band – "Jessica"
4. Pink Floyd – "Money"
5. Joe Walsh – "Rocky Mountain Way"
6. Bryan Adams – "The Only Thing That Looks Good on Me Is You"
7. Fleetwood Mac – "Shake Your Moneymaker"
8. ZZ Top – "Gimme All Your Lovin'"
9. Whitesnake – "Here I Go Again"
10. Boston – "More Than a Feeling"
11. Spin Doctors – "Two Princes"
12. The Rasmus – "In the Shadows"
13. Alien Ant Farm – "Smooth Criminal"
14. Billy Idol – "Rebel Yell"
15. EMF – "Unbelievable"
16. Beastie Boys – "(You Gotta) Fight for Your Right) To Party"
17. Stiltskin – "Inside"

===== Disc 3 =====
1. Blur – "Song 2"
2. The Knack – "My Sharona"
3. Free – "All Right Now"
4. David Bowie – "The Jean Genie"
5. The Undertones – "Teenage Kicks"
6. Status Quo – "Whatever You Want"
7. Eddie Cochran – "C'mon Everybody"
8. The Surfaris – "Wipe Out"
9. Steppenwolf – "Born to Be Wild"
10. Black Sabbath – "Paranoid"
11. George Thorogood and the Destroyers – "Bad to the Bone"
12. Johnny Kidd and the Pirates – "Shakin' All Over"
13. Chuck Berry – "Johnny B Goode"
14. The Troggs – "Wild Thing"
15. Buddy Holly and the Crickets - "That'll Be the Day"
16. Buzzcocks – "Ever Fallen in Love (With Someone You Shouldn't've)"
17. Love Sculpture - "Sabre Dance"
18. Queen – "Bohemian Rhapsody"

=== The Best Scottish Album in the World...Ever! ===
This album was released 9 June 1997. It is notable for being perhaps the only widely available compilation album that features Wolfstone, who feature with their song "Battle", credited as "The Battle". At the end of the second disc is the Dunblane cover of the song "Knockin' on Heaven's Door". All royalties from the recording of this song were sent to charities. The previous compilation Hits 97 also sent royalties from the song to charity.

=== The Best Driving Anthems in the World...Ever! ===
This is a CD compilation of power ballads. Several editions have been released since the first album, Power Ballads – The Greatest Driving Anthems in the World... Ever!, was released in 2004.

=== The Best Club Anthems in the World ...Ever! ===
This is a sub-series in the series which ran from 1997 to 2006.

Here is a list of albums in the series:

1. The Best Club Anthems ...Ever! (1997)
2. The Best Club Anthems 2 ...Ever! (1997)
3. The Best Club Anthems III ...Ever! (1998)
4. The Best Club Anthems 99 ...Ever! (1999)
5. The Best Club Anthems 2000 (1999)
6. The Best Club Anthems ...Ever! 2K (2000)
7. The Best Club Anthems 2001 (2000)
8. The Best Club Anthems 2002 (2002)
9. The Best Club Anthems Summer 2002 (2002)
10. The Best Club Anthems 2003 (2002)
11. The Very Best Club Anthems ...Ever! (2003)
12. The Best Club Anthems 2004 (2004)
13. The Best Club Anthems 2005 (2005)
14. The Best Club Anthems 05 (2005)
15. The Best Club Anthems Classics (2005)
16. The Best Club Anthems 2006 (2006)
17. The Best Club Anthems 80s Anthems (2006)
- Every album from the first volume to The Best Club Anthems 2003 was digitally mixed. Starting with The Very Best Club Anthems ...Ever!, The songs were unmixed.
- The same album also started another tradition which was slightly different packaging. Previous volumes featured a border on the cover with small circles in each corner, although this new tradition was short, and the border re-appeared for the last three albums in the series, starting with The Best Club Anthems Classics.
- The series was very successful. It offered a third alternative to the Now Dance series, with the other alternative being The Best Dance Album series.

== See also ==
- The Worst...Album in the World...Ever...EVER! (Album by Shirehorses)
- Best Blur Album in the World Ever (Working title for the Blur album Blur: The Best of)
- Now That's What I Call Music! (Another long-running series of compilations by Virgin Records, EMI and Ashley Abram)
