= The Complete BBC Sessions =

Compilation album by Cast
- Released: 26 February 2007
- Genre: Rock
- Label: Universal (9845704)

Cast chronology
| The Collection (2004) | The Complete BBC Sessions (2007) | Troubled Times (2011) |

The Complete BBC Sessions is a two disc compilation album released by the British band Cast. Comprising six live performances from 1995 to 1999, the album was released by Universal Records on 26 February 2007.

== Track listing ==
All songs written by John Power.

=== Disc one ===
Evening Sessions 24/4/95

1. "Four Walls" – 3:22
2. "Back of My Mind" – 3:11
3. "Finetime" – 3:07
4. "Follow Me Down" – 3:21

Mark Radcliffe 7/8/95

5. "Alright" – 3:25
6. "Sandstorm" – 2:46
7. "Finetime" – 3:02
8. "Reflections" – 3:03

Simon Mayo 15/10/96

9. "Finetime" – 3:19
10. "Flying" – 4:08

Mary Anne Hobbs 27/3/97

11. "Guiding Star" – 3:46
12. "Walkaway" – 4:20
13. "Sandstorm" – 2:58
14. "Free Me" – 4:37

=== Disc two ===
Simon Mayo 28/10/97

1. "Free Me" – 4:44
2. "Guiding Star" – 3:56

Lamacq Live 19/4/99

3. "Company Man" – 3:41
4. "Compared to You" – 3:37
5. "Dreamer" – 3:32
6. "She Falls" – 3:30
7. "Beat Mama" – 4:08
8. "Higher" – 4:16
9. "Alien" – 5:13
10. "The Feeling Remains" – 3:48
11. "Hideaway" – 6:25
