= Hurricane No. 1 discography =

- Studio albums: 4
- EPs: 1
- Compilation albums: 1
- Singles: 9

The discography of Hurricane No. 1, an English rock band, consists of three studio albums, one extended plays and nine singles.

== Studio albums ==
List of studio albums
Title	Album details	Peak chart positions
Title	Album details	UK
Hurricane #1 (Note: Released in the US on 28 October 1997 with two bonus tracks, "Touchdown" and "Smoke Rings".)	Released: 29 September 1997; Label: Creation (CRE 206); Format: CS, CD, DL, LP	22
Only the Strongest Will Survive	Released: 21 April 1999; Label: Creation (CRE 237); Format: CD, DL, LP, MD	55
Find What You Love and Let It Kill You	Released: 26 November 2015; Label: Tapete (TR 328); Format: CD, DL, LP	—
Melodic Rainbows	Released: 12 October 2016; Label: Rooster/Helipad (ROUK-002); Format: CD	—

== Compilation albums ==
List of compilation albums
Title	Album details
Step into My World	Released: 20 September 2004; Label: Sanctuary (SMEDD123); Format: CD, DL

== Extended plays ==
List of extended plays
Title	Album details	Peak chart positions
Title	Album details	UK
Step into My World EP	Released: October 1997; Label: Creation (CRES 276); Format: CD, 7”	19

== Singles ==
Title	Year	Peak chart positions	Album
Title	Year	UK	Album
"Step Into My World"	1997	29	Hurricane #1
"Just Another Illusion"	1997	35	Hurricane #1
"Chain Reaction"	1997	30	Hurricane #1
"Monday Afternoon"	1997	—	Hurricane #1
"Only the Strongest Will Survive"	1998	19	Non-album single
"Rising Sign"	1998	47	Only the Strongest Will Survive
"The Greatest High"	1999	43	Only the Strongest Will Survive
"Remote Control"	1999	75	Only the Strongest Will Survive
"Think of the Sunshine"	2015	—	Find What You Love and Let It Kill You

- “Remote Control” originally failed to chart in the Top 75 at No.98 due to an error in the charts computer system that week, causing sales from certain chains to be omitted. The chart position shown is from the revised chart when the data was later found and compiled into the listing.
