= The Collection (Cast album) =

Compilation album by Cast
- Released: 11 October 2004
- Genre: Rock
- Length: 71:25
- Label: Universal (9823041)

Cast chronology
Beetroot (2001)	The Collection (2004)	The Complete BBC Sessions (2007)

The Collection is a compilation album (comprising several singles as well as b-sides) by the English band Cast, released in 2004. The release has been criticised for the notable omission of some of the band's best known tracks, such as "Walkaway", "Sandstorm" and "Guiding Star", which were all top 10 hits.

== Track listing ==
All songs written by John Power.

1. "Flying" – 3:56 (non-album single)
2. "Promised Land" – 4:39 (from All Change)
3. "Live the Dream" – 3:55 (from Mother Nature Calls)
4. "She Falls" – 3:33 (from Magic Hour)
5. "Meditations" – 3:49 (from Beetroot)
6. "Compared to You" – 3:40 (from Magic Hour)
7. "Finetime" – 3:07 (from All Change)
8. "Follow Me Down" – 3:40 (b-side of "Alright")
9. "Giving It All Away" – 4:19 (from Beetroot)
10. "Free Me" (acoustic) – 4:33 (b-side of "Free Me")
11. "Magic Hour" – 3:12 (from Magic Hour)
12. "Dancing on the Flames" – 3:32 (b-side of "Free Me")
13. "Four Walls" – 3:12 (from All Change)
14. "I'm So Lonely" – 4:22 (from Mother Nature Calls)
15. "Mirror Me" – 4:05 (from Mother Nature Calls)
16. "Back of My Mind" – 3:05 (from All Change)
17. "Never Gonna Tell You What to Do (Revolution)" (live) – 5:07 (b-side of "I'm So Lonely")
18. "Canter" – 6:08 (b-side of "Free Me")

== Chart performance ==
The album was not eligible for the UK Albums Chart due to its low price, but peaked at 26 on the Budget Album chart.
