= Step into My World =

Step into My World may refer to:

- Step into My World (song), a 1997 song by Hurricane #1
- Step into My World EP, a 1997 EP by Hurricane #1
- Step into My World (album), a 2004 album by Hurricane #1
