= Burnt alive =

Burnt alive may refer to:

- Death by burning
- "Burnt Alive", a song from Scream, Dracula, Scream!
