= When in Rome (Do the Jerk) =

Single by Rocket from the Crypt

from the album RFTC
- A-side: "When in Rome (Do the Jerk)"
- B-side: "Tarzan"; "Tiger Feet Tonite"
- Released: 1998
- Recorded: 1998
- Genre: Alternative rock
- Label: Elemental
- Songwriter: Rocket from the Crypt
- Producers: Kevin Shirley, John Reis, Mark Trombino

Rocket from the Crypt singles chronology
"On a Rope" (1996)	"When in Rome (Do the Jerk)" (1998)	"Lipstick" (1998)

"When in Rome (Do the Jerk)" is a song by the American alternative rock band Rocket from the Crypt, released as the first single from their 1998 album RFTC. It was released as a shaped picture disc by Elemental Records, with the new songs "Tarzan" and "Tiger Feet Tonite" on the B-side. The single did not chart; in fact, of the three singles released from the album, only "Lipstick" managed to make the UK Singles Chart.

== Track listing ==
1. "When in Rome (Do the Jerk)" - 3:57
2. "Tarzan" - 3:38
3. "Tiger Feet Tonite" - 2:15

== Personnel ==
- Speedo (John Reis) - guitar, lead vocals
- ND (Andy Stamets) - guitar, backing vocals
- Petey X (Pete Reichert) - bass, backing vocals
- Apollo 9 (Paul O'Beirne) - saxophone, percussion, backing vocals
- JC 2000 (Jason Crane) - trumpet, percussion, backing vocals
- Atom (Adam Willard) - drums
- Jim Dickinson - organ on "When in Rome (Do the Jerk)"
- Kevin Shirley - recording, production, and mixing of "When in Rome (Do the Jerk)"
- Mark Trombino - production and mixing of "Tarzan"
