= Step into My World (album) =

Step Into My World

Compilation album by Hurricane #1
- Released: 20 September 2004
- Recorded: 1996–1999
- Genre: Britpop
- Length: 149:40
- Label: Sanctuary
- Producer: Stephen Harris, Andy Bell

Hurricane #1 chronology
Only the Strongest Will Survive (1999)	Step Into My World (2004)	Find What You Love and Let It Kill You (2015)

Step Into My World is a compilation album by British rock band Hurricane #1, released in 2004. The anthology is a 30-track double album including previously unreleased tracks, rare B-sides and remixes. In addition the anthology features a picture sleeve and extensive liner notes written by Andy Bell.

The album was released nearly 5 years after the band split in 1999.

== Track listing ==
Disc one

No.	Title	Original release	Length
1.	"Step into My World"	Hurricane #1 (1997)	4:58
2.	"Just Another Illusion"	Hurricane #1 (1997)	4:48
3.	"Chain Reaction"	Hurricane #1 (1997)	3:44
4.	"Keep Walking"	"Chain Reaction" (1997)	4:18
5.	"Monday Afternoon"	Hurricane #1 (1997)	3:01
6.	"Strange Meeting"	Hurricane #1 (1997)	4:05
7.	"Let Go of My Dream"	Hurricane #1 (1997)	2:38
8.	"Step into My World (The Perfecto mix)"	"Step into My World Mixes" (1997)	6:13
9.	"If You Think It's Easy"	"Step into My World EP" (1997)	5:12
10.	"Only the Strongest Will Survive (Farley and Heller remix)"	"Only the Strongest Will Survive" (1998)	8:10
11.	"Rising Sign"	Only the Strongest Will Survive (1999)	6:57
12.	"Separation Sunday"	Only the Strongest Will Survive (1999)	5:32
13.	"Remote Control"	Only the Strongest Will Survive (1999)	4:52
14.	"You Wear It Well"	Only the Strongest Will Survive (1999)	4:12
15.	"Smoke Rings"	"Step into My World" (1997)	8:35

Disc two

No.	Title	Original release	Length
1.	"Caned! (1996 demo)"	Previously unreleased	3:12
2.	"Step into My World (Kris Needs mix)"	Previously unreleased	5:35
3.	"Just Another Illusion (FC Kahuna mix)"	"Just Another Illusion" (1997)	6:43
4.	"Touchdown (Radio 1 session version)"	Previously unreleased	4:40
5.	"Slapshot"	"Just Another Illusion" (1997)	4:59
6.	"Why Don't You Do It?"	"Chain Reaction" (1997)	4:04
7.	"Step into My World (Andy Bell remix)"	"Step into My World" (1997)	6:52
8.	"Only the Strongest Will Survive (band version)"	"Only the Strongest Will Survive" (1998)	7:32
9.	"Slow Speed"	"Only the Strongest Will Survive" (1998)	5:21
10.	"Rising Sun (Cuba mix)"	"Rising Sun" (1998)	5:34
11.	"The Price That We Pay (band version)"	Previously unreleased	4:15
12.	"Bullet Train"	"Rising Sun" (1998)	6:25
13.	"Sweet Insanity"	"The Greatest High" (1999)	4:18
14.	"Untitled Instrumental (1999 demo)"	Previously unreleased	2:38
15.	"Say It's Forever"	"The Greatest High" (1999)	4:39
