= Blameless (band) =

English rock quartet

Blameless, 1995

Blameless were a rock quartet formed in Sheffield, England in 1993/94. They reached the top 30 of the UK Singles Chart in 1996 with the song "Breathe (A Little Deeper)".

The band consisted of singer Jared Daley, guitarist Matt Pirt, bassist Jason Leggatt and drummer Jon Dodd. Although coming from the UK during a "British Invasion" headed by Oasis, the band have been more-often compared to American bands such as Pearl Jam and R.E.M.

Their inclusion of the song "Town Clowns" in the Rough Trade Singles Club caught the attention of several labels, and the band finally signed to China Records. They released a single for China, "Don't Say You're Sorry", and then went to Fort Apache Studios in Boston, Massachusetts to record their debut album, The Signs Are All There. Jared Daley later said, "When China said we were going to Boston, we thought they meant Boston, Lincolnshire." The album was produced by Paul Q. Kolderie and Sean Slade, and was released in October 1995 on China Records/Atlantic Records. Blameless supported Moist and the Bluetones on tour in 1995 and played at two of the Heineken Music Festivals, as well as at Glastonbury Festival.

The Signs Are All There failed to chart and did not meet sales expectations. In March 1996, the band had a minor hit with the non-album single "Breathe (A Little Deeper)" which spent 3 weeks in the UK charts and cracked the UK top 40 of the UK Singles Chart peaking at chart position #27. Follow up single "Signs..." (the album's title track) was released at the start of June 1996 and reached #49. The band re-issued their LP, but sales were disappointing and the band ultimately disbanded. "Breathe (A Little Deeper)" was selected for the Shine 5 album released by PolyGram in July 1996.

"Town Clowns" was a top 10 indie hit in the UK and was the band's first U.S. single.
