= Speedy (band) =

Britpop band

- Origin: Sheffield, England
- Genres: Britpop
- Years active: 1994–1998, 2014
- Labels: Boiler House!, Arista, BMG
- Past members: Philip Watson (Vocals); Bronwen Stone (Drums); Moony Wainwright (Bass); Paul Turner (Keyboards); Richard Sutcliffe (Guitar)

Speedy was a five-piece Indie Pop/Britpop band from Sheffield, England, whose songs were known for their witty lyrics, often observing the darker and seedier side of working class life; "kitchen sink narratives" in the words of founder and lead singer Philip Watson. Their debut single on a major label Boy Wonder reached No. 56 in the UK Singles Chart in late 1996, but further chart success eluded them.

== Career ==
=== Blammo! ===
Band members Philip Watson (Vocals), Bronwen Stone (Drums), Moony Wainwright (Bass), Paul Turner (Keyboards) and Richard Sutcliffe (Guitar) (who replaced Tracey Plant) had previously performed under the name Blammo! between 1988 and 1994. In this guise they issued five singles; three on Heywood based label Imaginary Records who also had Cud and The Mock Turtles on their roster. The band was invited to support The Beautiful South on three tours, which enabled them to perform in front of several thousand people at London [Wembley Arena], Birmingham [NEC] and Sheffield [Arena], as well as extensive touring across Europe including: Amsterdam, Hamburg, Stuttgart, Berlin, Frankfurt, Milan, Rimini, Barcelona, Paris, and Dublin. They were well received for their anarchic, tongue-in-cheek live performances with Paul Heaton [The Beautiful South] describing Watson as, ‘like me when I could be bothered’.

=== Speedy ===
Their first performance under the Speedy moniker was at the Spud Club on Sunday 3 April 1994. The following year, their track Sporting Life (produced by Danny Shackleton) was included on a limited edition 7" single. The Saturday Night Special: Silence is Golden EP was released by Leadmill Records, which was an imprint of the famous Sheffield venue of the same name. The notes on the back cover commented that The Leadmill had been voted the number one live venue/club in the UK in the 1994 Melody Maker music poll.

Signed to Arista Records imprint Boilerhouse!, the band's first single was ‘Another Day In The Life Of Riley’ which reached No.3 in the Indie Chart. Their next single achieved 'mainstream' success in late 1996 with the release of single Boy Wonder, which reached No. 2 on the Indie Chart. Receiving nationwide airplay on Radio 1, it also entered the official UK Singles Chart at No. 56 on 9 November 1996, and has been included in many competitions of ‘indie’ classic songs from the era. Boy Wonder made it onto Polygram's Shine 7 various artists compilation album (Track 16), the Indie equivalent of the Now That's What I Call Music! series. Television exposure followed, including an appearance on the BBC Saturday lunchtime sports programme Football Focus and two appearances on ‘Live ‘n’ Kicking’ a BBC Saturday morning show

But, despite this early success, and support from Radio 1 DJ Zoë Ball , who secured the band two appearances on the Saturday morning TV show Live and Kicking, which she presented with Jamie Theakston, subsequent singles Anytime Anyplace Nowhere, Time for You and Going Home failed to chart. Whilst an album was recorded, Speedy and Arista parted company before its release. The band continued to perform live, playing Music in the Sun in 1997, alongside Longpigs and Babybird, but the band members eventually went their separate ways in 1998.

15 years later a former fan and crime writer Nick Quantrill, acquired the audio files to Speedy's lost album News From Nowhere. He passed them on to a new blogging site Britpop Revival and later the band played its first live shows in over 17 years.

On 30 November 2012 The Britpop Revival Radio Show on Phonic FM revealed that the unreleased album would be made available for streaming from Saturday 15 December 2012. Then, on 20 January 2013, singer Philip Watson was interviewed on the show and asked what he thought about the album resurfacing after 15 years on the shelf, he said: "I'm flattered that people have somehow found, like and now want to share this album. Also slightly embarrassed. But only slightly. It's alright."

The music on the album falls somewhere between Pulp and Blur. Big tunes with chirpy choruses coupled with wry observational lyrics addressing love, life on the dole and summer holiday sex; together with darker themes such as domestic violence, teenage pregnancy and juvenile crime.

In February 2014 the people behind indie label Alcopop! Records and the 1p Album Club blog announced the launch of a new venture called The Lost Music Club. The label would dig out albums that were recorded but never released, and make them available to the public. The press release announced that first release was to be "from cult 1990s Sheffield band Speedy who, despite scoring a Radio 1 Single of the Week and gigging relentlessly in the mid-90s, saw their debut album, originally scheduled for a 1997 release, permanently shelved."

So after a 17-year hiatus the band reformed for two shows in April 2014 to mark the eventual release of their album "News from Nowhere". The shows took place on Friday 4 April 2014 at London Birthdays in Dalston, and on Saturday 5 April 2015 at the band's spiritual home The Leadmill in Sheffield. And with that the band returned to their day jobs.

The album News From Nowhere was finally released on Monday 7 April 2015. On the same day, Sarah Lay reviewing the album for Louder Than War, the music website established by award-winning journalist, TV and radio presenter John Robb concluded: A lost classic? Maybe not. But a gem from the analogue age that certainly didn't deserve to be unheard for so long – well worth a listen for lovers of underdogs or the Britpop sound, for ’90s throwbacks or anyone who just wants to get their ears around some raucous indiepop.

==== Life After Speedy ====
Singer Philip Watson is an architect and Visiting Professor at the University of Leeds.

Drummer Bronwen Stone is an archaeologist. For many years she ran Antics, an antiques shop on Ecclesall Road in Sheffield.

‘Moony’ Wainwright is a successful music tutor, and writer with his own band, Speed For Lovers.

Richard Sutcliffe has tried to tell people what he does but no one understands it.

Paul Turner works for the Department of Social Security.

== Discography ==
Saturday Girl (1994) (Fanclub Cassette)
A1) Saturday Girl
A2) Slippers
B1) Cherry Street

Pills to Purge Melancholy (1994) (Fanclub Cassette)
A1) News From Nowhere
A2) Best Years
A3) There's Always Suicide
A4) Slippers
B1) Saturday Girl
B2) The Boy Hairdresser
B3) What a Carry On
B4) Almanac of Slack

Anytime, Anyplace ... Nowhere (1995) (Fanclub Cassette)
A1) Sporting Life
A2) News from Nowhere
A3) Illustrated Man
B1) Speakeasy
B2) I Like You So Much
B3) How Low?

Saturday Night Special: Silence is Golden EP (1995) (Leadmill Records) (Various Artists)
7" Vinyl EP (LEAD003)
A1) Jet Girl (The Wedding Present)
A2) The Sporting Life (Speedy)
B1) Dolphins (Heights of Abraham)
B2) All the Time in the World (The Apartments)

Saturday Girl (Demo Cassette)
1) Saturday Girl
2) Slippers

News From Nowhere (Demo Cassette)
1) News From Nowhere
2) Best Years

A Day in the Life (of Riley) (1996) (Boilerhouse!)
7" Vinyl Single (BOIL1)
1) A Day in the Life (of Riley)
2) How Low?

Boy Wonder (Nov 1996) (Boilerhouse!) UK #56
7" Vinyl Single (BOIL2V)
1) Boy Wonder
2) Shopping Around
CD Digipack (BOIL2CD)
1) Boy Wonder
2) Shopping Around
3) The Illustrated Man

I Like You So Much (December 1996) (Fanclub 7" Christmas Single)
7" Vinyl Single Sided Single (BOIL3VPA)
1) I Like You So Much (Bedroom Mix)
2) Band signatures etched into disc [Unplayable]

Anytime Anyplace Nowhere (1997) (Boilerhouse!)
CD1 (BOIL3CD1)
1) Anytime Anyplace Nowhere
2) Heard Seen Done Been (Live Version)
3) Sweetalk
4) This is England
CD2 (BOIL3CD2)
1) Heard Seen Done Been
2) Anytime Anyplace Nowhere (Youth Club Version)
3) Almanac of Slack
4) Boy Wonder (Live Version)
12" Vinyl (BOIL3P1) (European Only Promotional Release)
1) Anytime Anyplace Nowhere (Commercial Suicide Mix)
2) Anytime Anyplace Nowhere (Dub Version)
3) Anytime Anyplace Nowhere (Youth Club Version)

Time For You (27 May 1997) (Boilerhouse!)
7" Vinyl Single (BOIL4V)
1) Time for You (radio edit)
2) Where Were You?
CD1 (BOIL4CD1)
1) Time for You (radio edit)
2) Where Were You?
3) Sour 16
CD2 (BOIL4CD2)
1) Time for You
2) Nearly Man
3) Going Home (Acoustic)

Going Home (1998) (Boilerhouse!)
CD1 (BOIL5CD1)
1) Going Home
2) Dead Sheep
3) Need for Speed
CD2 (BOIL5CD2)
1) Going Home
2) Whole Wide World
3) Bad Time Girl

News From Nowhere (7 April 2014) (LOSTMUSICCLUB001)
1) Anytime, Anyplace, Nowhere
2) Boy Wonder
3) Nine O'Clock News
4) The Sporting Life
5) Time for You
6) Going Home
7) I Like You So Much
8) Another Day (In the Life of Riley)
9) Heard, Seen, Done, Been
10) Karaoke King
11) Fisto
12) News From Nowhere
