= Young Livers =

Single by Rocket from the Crypt

from the album Scream, Dracula, Scream!
- A-side: "Young Livers"
- B-side: "Burning Army Men"
- Released: 1996
- Recorded: 1995
- Genre: Alternative rock
- Label: Elemental (ELM 335)
- Songwriter(s): Rocket from the Crypt
- Producer(s): John Reis

Rocket from the Crypt singles chronology
"Born in '69" (1995)	"Young Livers" (1996)	"On a Rope" (1996)

"Young Livers" is a song by the American alternative rock band Rocket from the Crypt, released as the second single from their 1995 album Scream, Dracula, Scream! It was released as both a 7" vinyl and CD single by Elemental Records and peaked at #67 on the UK Singles Chart. A music video for the song received play on MTV and MTV Europe.

== Track listing ==
1. "Young Livers" - 2:54
2. "Burning Army Men" - 1:04

== Personnel ==
- Speedo (John Reis) - guitar, lead vocals
- ND (Andy Stamets) - guitar, backing vocals
- Petey X (Pete Reichert) - bass, backing vocals
- Apollo 9 (Paul O'Beirne) - saxophone, percussion, backing vocals
- JC 2000 (Jason Crane) - trumpet, percussion, backing vocals
- Atom (Adam Willard) - drums
- Frank Daly - backing vocals
- Donnell Cameron - engineering, recording
- Eddie Miller - assistant engineer
- Andy Wallace - mixing of "Young Livers"
- Geoff Harrington and Mike Arnold - recording and mixing of "Burning Army Men"

== Chart positions ==
Chart (1995)	Peak position
UK Singles	67
