= Free Me (Cast song) =

1997 single by Cast

Single by Cast

from the album Mother Nature Calls
- B-side: "Come on Everybody"; "Canter"; "Release My Soul"; "Dancing on the Flames"
- Released: 24 March 1997
- Label: Polydor (573651)
- Songwriter: John Power
- Producer: John Leckie

Cast singles chronology
"Flying" (1996)	"Free Me" (1997)	"Guiding Star" (1997)

"Free Me" is the sixth single by the Liverpool britpop band Cast, fronted by ex La's bassist John Power.

It is the band's first single to have more than one word in its title, the previous five all having one word: "Finetime", "Alright", "Sandstorm", "Walkaway" and "Flying".

== Formats and track listings ==
CD single (1)

1. "Free Me"
2. "Come on Everybody"
3. "Canter"
4. "Free Me" (acoustic)

CD single (2)

1. "Free Me"
2. "Release My Soul"
3. "Dancing on the Flames"

7" single

1. "Free Me"
2. "Come on Everybody"

== Personnel ==
Cast

- John Power – vocals, guitar
- Peter Wilkinson – backing vocals, bass
- Liam "Skin" Tyson – guitar
- Keith O'Neill – drums

Production

- John Leckie – producer
- Mark "Spike" Stent – mixing

== Chart performance ==
Chart (1997)	Peak position
Israel (IBA)	11
UK Singles (Official Charts)	7

=== Year-end charts ===
Chart (1997)	Position
UK Singles (OCC)	142
