= Spice Girls Present... The Best Girl Power Album... Ever! =

Compilation album by various artists
- Released: 5 May 1997
- Genre: Pop; R&B
- Label: Virgin
- Compiler: Spice Girls, Ashley Abram

Spice Girls Present... The Best Girl Power Album... Ever! is a 1997 compilation album released by Virgin Records. The album is a collection of "girl power"-themed songs by various artists that were "hand-picked" by English girl group the Spice Girls.

== Track listing ==
CD 1

1. Spice Girls – "Who Do You Think You Are"
2. Tori Amos – "Professional Widow"
3. Eurythmics and Aretha Franklin – "Sisters Are Doin' It for Themselves"
4. Republica – "Ready to Go"
5. Skunk Anansie – "Weak"
6. En Vogue – "Free Your Mind"
7. Labelle – "Lady Marmalade"
8. Chaka Khan – "I'm Every Woman" (Remix Edit)
9. Gabrielle – "Give Me a Little More Time"
10. Martha and the Vandellas – "Dancing in the Street"
11. Aretha Franklin – "Respect"
12. The Pointer Sisters – "Slow Hand"
13. Tina Turner – "What's Love Got to Do with It?"
14. Neneh Cherry – "Woman"
15. Karyn White – "Superwoman" (Edit)
16. Chantay Savage – "I Will Survive"
17. Brownstone – "If You Love Me"
18. Aaliyah – "Back & Forth"
19. Mary J. Blige – "Mary Jane (All Night Long)"
20. Adina Howard – "Freak like Me" (Radio Edit)
21. Salt 'n' Pepa – "Let's Talk About Sex"

CD 2

1. Spice Girls – "Wannabe"
2. Cyndi Lauper – "Hey Now (Girls Just Want to Have Fun)"
3. Diana King – "Shy Guy"
4. Neneh Cherry – "Buffalo Stance"
5. Gwen Guthrie – "Ain't Nothin' Goin' On but the Rent"
6. Salt 'n' Pepa – "None of Your Business"
7. TLC – "Creep"
8. SWV – "Right Here" (Human Nature Radio Mix)
9. Sister Sledge – "We Are Family"
10. Blondie – "Heart of Glass"
11. Belinda Carlisle – "Heaven Is a Place on Earth"
12. The Bangles – "Manic Monday"
13. Alisha's Attic – "Alisha Rules the World"
14. Shakespears Sister – "You're History"
15. Cathy Dennis – "You Lied to Me"
16. RuPaul – "Supermodel"
17. 20 Fingers feat. Gillette – "Short Short Man" (Radio Edit)
18. The Weather Girls – "It's Raining Men"
19. Luscious Jackson – "Naked Eye"
20. HAL feat. Gillian Anderson – "Extremis" (Qattara Remix Edit)

== Critical reception ==
Professional ratings
Review scores
Source	Rating
NME	2/10

The Cambridge History of Twentieth-Century Music questioned if the compilation was truly representative of women in the music industry. The authors noted that the album's focus on female vocalists from the UK and US meant a lack of representation for international artists, as well as for women in instrumental support, songwriting and production roles. Ken Banks of Aberdeen Press and Journal gave the compilation two out of five stars, concluding: "Value, perhaps, but pretty crudely thrown together and nothing special at all." Clark Collis of The Daily Telegraph called it a "cash-in of unprecedented proportions," but given the "demented mixture of artists" decided that the album was "simply too weird a project to criticise."

== Commercial performance ==
The album peaked at number two on the UK Compilation Chart, and peaked at number eight on the overall UK albums chart as compiled by Billboard. (Note: Since 1989, the UK Albums Chart, as compiled by the Official Charts Company, does not include multi-artist compilation albums.)

== Certifications and sales ==
Certifications for Spice Girls Present... The Best Girl Power Album... Ever!
Region	Certification	Certified units/sales
United Kingdom (BPI)	Gold	100,000^{^}
^{^} Shipments figures based on certification alone.

== See also ==
- The Best... Album in the World...Ever!
