= Scream, Dracula, Scream! =

Studio album by Rocket from the Crypt
- Released: October 10, 1995
- Recorded: 1995
- Genre: Punk rock; hardcore punk
- Length: 43:44
- Label: Interscope (CD), Cargo/Headhunter (LP), Elemental (UK)
- Producer: John Reis

Rocket from the Crypt chronology
Hot Charity (1995)	Scream, Dracula, Scream! (1995)	RFTC (1998)

Professional ratings
Review scores
Source	Rating
AllMusic	4.5/5 stars
Encyclopedia of Popular Music	4/5 stars
The Great Rock Discography	8/10
The Guardian	4/5 stars
Los Angeles Times	3/4 stars
MusicHound Rock	3/5
NME	8/10
Q	4/5 stars
Rolling Stone	3/5 stars
Spin	7/10

Scream, Dracula, Scream! is the fourth studio album by American punk rock band Rocket from the Crypt, released on October 10, 1995, by Interscope Records. It was the band's first major-label release. Music videos were filmed for the singles "On a Rope," "Born in '69" and "Young Livers," and the band embarked on extensive tours of the US, UK and Europe. They experienced a surge of popularity in the UK, where "On a Rope" entered the music charts at #12 and was a hit on MTV Europe, earning them rave reviews in New Musical Express and allowing them to play Top of the Pops.

The album also made the band an alternative rock radio hit in the US, where their videos were featured on MTV and the album received many positive reviews in both mainstream and underground music presses. A large headlining tour in support of the album ensued in 1996, and there were supporting tours with Rancid and Soundgarden. During these tours the band gained a reputation for a series of interesting and, at times, seemingly ludicrous gimmicks and stage antics which included holding raffles during live performances, spinning a large game show wheel to determine set lists, onstage fire breathing, annual Halloween and New Year's shows, and the wearing of coordinated and progressively more ornate stage costumes. In Europe the band also hosted a German variety show, played children's shows and morning shows, and did interviews with fashion magazines. While unorthodox, these antics increased the band's reputation as an energetic live act and helped to increase album sales.

Scream, Dracula, Scream! was the last of three releases by Rocket from the Crypt in 1995. The EP The State of Art is on Fire and LP Hot Charity had preceded the album that year, and singer/guitarist John Reis would later refer to these three records as a "trilogy".

"Scream, Dracula, Scream!" also had different copies for Japan and Australia. Both of them had songs from the 'Hot Charity' recording. The Japan release just had the songs put on the CD, but the "Australian Bonus CD Tour Edition" had a bonus CD. The Australian copy had "Pushed", "My Arrow's Aim", "Lorna Doom", "Shucks", "Cloud Over Branson", and "Feathered Friends". The Japanese copy also had "Pushed", "My Arrow's Aim", and "Lorna Doom". But instead of "Shucks", "Cloud Over Branson", and "Feathered Friends", they had "Guilt Free", "Poison Eye", and "Pity Yr Paws". All together, the whole 'Hot Charity' recording was released on the two versions.

== Recording ==
Scream, Dracula, Scream! was Rocket from the Crypt's most ambitious recording to date. Using the extensive recording budget granted them by Interscope, the band employed numerous guest musicians, a string section, additional engineers and mixing sessions, and experimented with several instruments they had not used before. According to the album's liner notes the album was rehearsed and recorded over a 2-month period, with the basic tracks recorded live on a 4-track machine and overdubs of the backing vocals and orchestra recorded later. The album's title was taken from the lyrics of a Wesley Willis song.

The album's liner notes also state that the band intended Scream, Dracula, Scream! to consist of onev cohesive body of music, with interstitial musical pieces bridging the gaps between songs. According to Reis,

there was this connective tissue that ran through the entire record – a viola, two violins, one or two cellos and a bass and they play on some of the songs already. But, you know, the label didn’t really like it. They would've let us use it – it wasn't like they were saying they weren't going to put it out. They were very interested in what we were doing – we were in their favour at that time – but I didn't fight the decision because I kind of thought that the label were right. Conceptually it was a great idea but I didn't really think it was working even though we put so much work into it: I was really bummed. But that was just the mode we were in at the time – let's make things the most difficult on ourselves as possible (laughs) – that was just the way we did things.

== Legacy ==
The album was included in the book 1001 Albums You Must Hear Before You Die.

== Track listing ==
No.	Title	Length
1.	"Middle"	1:00
2.	"Born in '69"	2:16
3.	"On a Rope"	2:53
4.	"Young Livers"	2:54
5.	"Drop Out"	3:00
6.	"Used"	2:39
7.	"Ball Lightning"	3:50
8.	"Fat Lip"	2:42
9.	"Suit City"	2:34
10.	"Heater Hands"	3:36
11.	"Misbeaten"	4:02
12.	"Come See, Come Saw"	3:39
13.	"Salt Future"	3:51
14.	"Burnt Alive"	4:37
Total length:		43:44

Japanese edition bonus tracks
No.	Title	Length
15.	"Pushed"	2:25
16.	"My Arrows Aim"	3:18
17.	"Lorna Doom"	2:16
18.	"Guilt Free"	3:41
19.	"Poison Eye"	2:43
20.	"Pity Yr Paws"	3:30

== Personnel ==
- Speedo (John Reis) - guitar, lead vocals
- ND (Andy Stamets) - guitar, backing vocals
- Petey X (Pete Reichert) - bass, backing vocals
- Apollo 9 (Paul O'Beirne) - saxophone, percussion, backing vocals
- JC 2000 (Jason Crane) - trumpet, percussion, backing vocals
- Atom (Adam Willard) - drums

=== Additional musicians ===
- John Reis Sr. - accordion on "Used"
- Geoff Harrington - Hammond B3 organ on "Come See, Come Saw"
- Eric Christian - guitar solo on "Come See, Come Saw"
- Raymond Kelley - cello
- Don Palmer - violin
- Jay Rosen - violin
- James Ross - viola
- Mick Collins, Frank Daly - additional vocals
- Diane Gordon, Natalie Burks, and Latina Webb - backing vocals on "Born in '69" and "Come See, Come Saw"
- Roger Freeland, Gene Miller, and Joseph Pizzulo - backing vocals on "Used" and "Misbeaten"

=== Technical ===
- John Reis Jr. - producer, conductor
- Donnell Cameron - recording, engineer
- Eddie Miller - recording, engineer
- Andy Wallace - mixing (tracks: 2–5, 7, 8, 10, 12, 13)
- Steve Cisco - mixing assistant
- Mark Trombino - engineer, mixing (tracks: 1, 6, 9, 11, 14)
- Kelle Musgrave - production coordination
- Henry Kadinski - recording supervisor
- Miki Vukovich - photography
- Mike Nelson - layout, videograbs, type
