= Sinking (album) =

Studio album by The Aloof
- Released: 27 May 1996
- Recorded: 1996
- Studios: Sabresonic Studios, London; Abbey Road Studios, London
- Genres: Techno; dub; trip hop; big beat; jungle; dance-rock
- Length: 70:21
- Label: East West
- Producer: The Aloof

The Aloof chronology
Cover the Crime (1994)	Sinking (1996)	Seeking Pleasure (1998)

Singles from Sinking
- 1. "Stuck on the Shelf" Released: 1995; 2. "Wish You Were Here" Released: 1996 (re-released 1997); 3. "One Night Stand" Released: 1996; 4. "Sinking" Released: 1997

Sinking is the second studio album by British electronic music group the Aloof, released by East West Records in the United Kingdom on 27 May 1996. Following the rave-influenced style of the group's debut album Cover the Crime (1994), Sinking brought the band into a darker, more mellow direction, as the result of the group's desire to deliver a "band" feel, aided by the members' newfound disillusionment with club culture. The record fuses styles of techno, dub, trip hop and jungle music and incorporates string arrangements and sombre lyrics.

The album's amorphous musical style was reflected in East West's wide-spanning promotional campaign for the record, which included a two-hour Party Zone special on MTV Europe. Although Sinking did not chart, four singles were released from the album, two of which reached the UK Singles Chart in 1996: "Wish You Were Here", which reached number 61 and "One Night Stand" which reached number 30, becoming the band's biggest hit single. A remixed version of "Wish You Were Here" was then released in early 1997, peaking at number 43. The album received critical acclaim, with journalists complimenting the band's new direction. In 2000, it was named the 46th best dance album of all time in the final edition of the book All Time Top 1000 Albums.

== Background and recording ==
The Aloof formed as an electronic duo in 1990, consisting of disc jockey Dean Thatcher and producer Jagz Kooner (also a member of The Sabres of Paradise). Their single "Never Get Out of the Boat" was originally a white label release, but was soon reissued by FFRR. The Aloof's line-up expanded within a year to include programmer Gary Burns (Kooners' Sabres bandmate) and vocalist Ricky Barrow, and the group signed to Cowboy Records. After transitioning from a nightclub act to a "true live band", they added drummer Richard Thair in 1993 before setting up their own label Flaw Records, on which they released their debut album Cover the Crime (1994). The record charted successfully on the UK Independent Albums Chart, and received the attention of East West Records, who consequently signed the Aloof and re-released Cover the Crime in 1995.

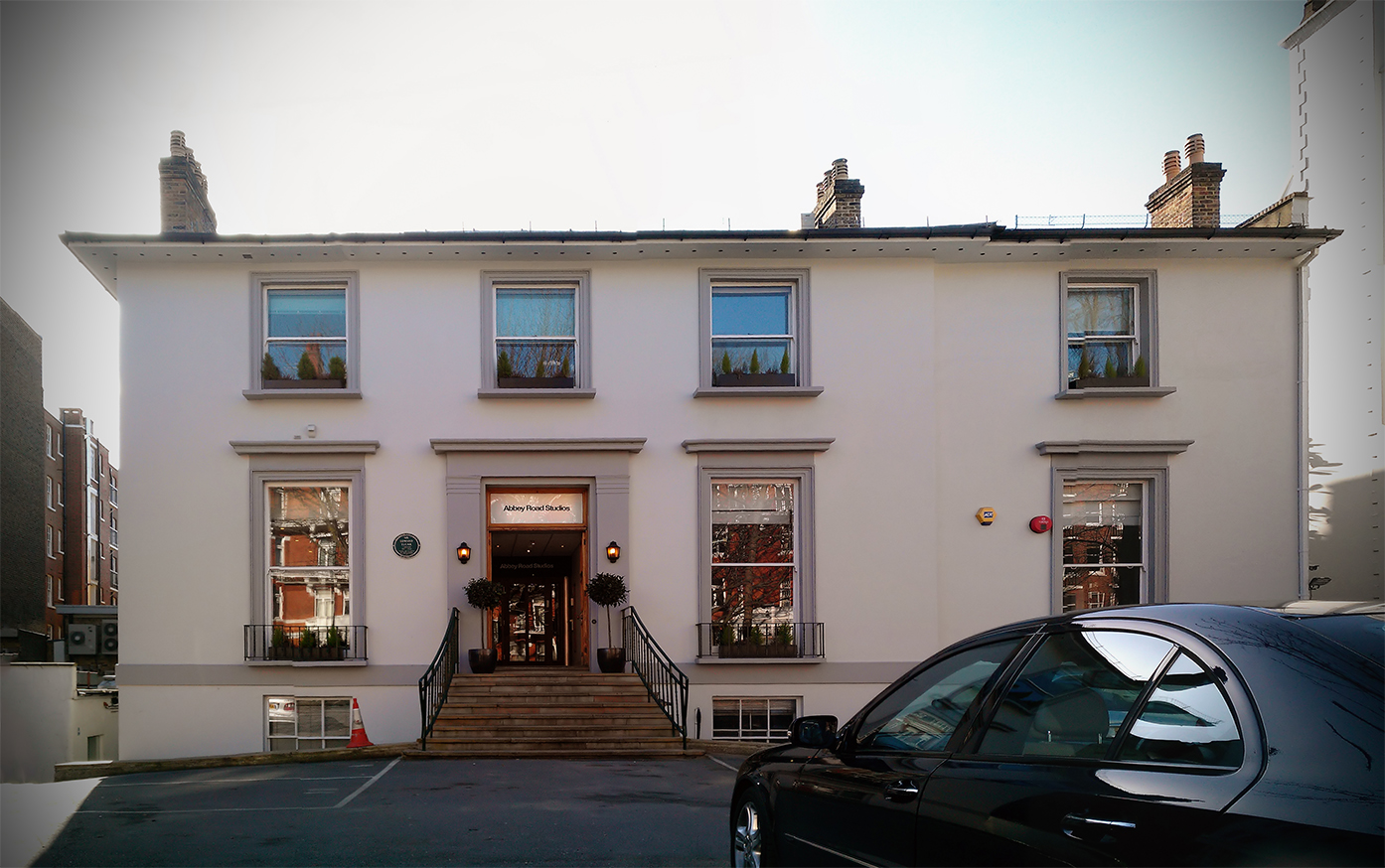
The strings on "The Last Stand" were recorded at Abbey Road Studios.

Sinking was recorded for East West in early 1996. The label's A&R manager Stanley left the Aloof to record the album alone without label interference. He stated that the group "are all experts in their field, especially Gary and Jagz, considering the things that they've produced. I wouldn't dream of interfering." The Aloof produced and mixed Sinking at Sabresonic Studios, although Abbey Road Studios, London, was used for the recording of the strings on the album's closing track "The Last Stand".

Although Cover the Crime featured rave material and several "serious" songs, the Aloof moved towards a "band" feel for the development of Sinking, a change which stemmed from the group's newfound disillusionment with dance and club culture. Thatcher commented in 1996: "A few years ago, we would be in clubs every night. Now, there are not all that many clubs to go to, apart from Stealth, Club Head, and Athletico." The group were introduced to an eclectic array of new influences via the Megadog tours they played on, which featured bands and disc jockeys. Kooner said these tours "broke the barriers down, and they would take a chance on acts. They would play techno next to rock'n'roll." The album's relatively laid-back sound was also the result of the group listening to Burns' collection of blues records.

== Composition ==
"Sinking is a million miles away from the ecstasy-fuelled, hedonistic escapism of the late-'80s. Instead, it is a harrowing trip through the drug-fuelled paranoia of the '90s, the epitome of post-rave dinginess."

— Dominic Pride, Billboard

Sinking consists of a mixture of songs and instrumentals, linked by a common theme of abuse of drugs, using other people and self-harm. Dominic Pride of Billboard described the album as a sinister, drug-influenced release that fuses dub, jungle and techno music with "blunted beats" and 'soaring' strings, thus creating a sound that eschews easy labelling. He further commented that the material is not dance music, contrary to some accounts, because the record is "anything but danceable." Keyboard magazine described the record as an unusual exploration of techno, dub and trip hop. The dark feel to the record is represented in its unique vocals, distorted beats, atmospheres and strings.

Barrow's lyrics for Sinking are bitter and melancholic. The introspective lyrics, dub-styled production and lush dynamics of the album drew frequent comparisons to Massive Attack, and the Aloof welcomed comparisons to Underworld and Leftfield, acts who helped "break down the barriers" of dance music and indie rock. Thatcher commented: "There was a time that indie kids thought dance was a shiny, happy kind of music. Those acts changed that way of thinking forever." Kooner commented that the album's "trippy, slightly paranoid feel" was a reflection of the times: "The drugs are different now. There are more people on powder than pills, and I think that's reflected in the music." According to writer John Bush, the influence of blues and film music gives a "contemplative earthiness" to the material, especially on "Wish You Were Here".

"Abuse" features hammering, sequencer arcs and lyrics about "getting wasted." "One Night Stand" is a stately trip hop song led by strings. Its lyrics were written by Barrow following a break up with his long-term girlfriend. Stanley felt the song could benefit from the inclusion of strings, so the group recorded another version entitled "The Last Stand" which features a 32-piece orchestra performing the piece's soaring arrangement. Caroline Dale arranged the strings on this version, which is positioned as the final track on the album.

== Release and promotion ==
Despite the album's amorphous musical style, with the Aloof consciously avoiding being "put in a bracket" according to Thatcher, East West UK were undaunted by the album and marketed its unusual sound in a wide-ranging promotional approach to help the record reach the band's diverse audience. The label's marketing director Elise Taylor said the campaign covered "all bases" by advertising the album in both the mainstream and dance press and putting flyers outside concert venues, as well as targeting both independent and major stores for the album's retail. On 31 May 1996, the Aloof were the subject of a two-hour Party Zone special on MTV Europe, which featured all of the group's music videos in addition to interviews and live performances. MTV Europe producer James Hyman devoted the whole episode to the group because of his belief in the group, and he felt the underground audience that Party Zone attracted would crossover with that of the band's fan base.

Sinking was released by East West in the United Kingdom on 27 May 1996, but failed to reach the UK Albums Chart. The American release of the album followed in 1997. East West A&R director Stanley had a say in the album's choice of singles; "Stuck on the Shelf" was issued as the first single in late 1995, followed by "Wish You Were Here" on 20 May 1996. The latter was the first single to reach the UK Singles Chart when it peaked at number 61. The subsequent single "One Night Stand" reached number 30 in November, becoming the band's biggest hit single. An alternate version of "Wish You Were Here" peaked at number 43 in March 1997. Prior to the album's release, The Aloof toured Benelux, where they had acquired a small, devoted following. They then toured in promotion Sinking in summer 1996, sometimes sharing the stage with a disparate array of acts like James Lavelle, Cocteau Twins, Strangelove and the Chemical Brothers. On 14 June 1997, the group performed "Abuse", "Hot Knives at Lunchtime" and "Sinking" in a session for BBC Radio 1.

Following the death of Princess Diana on 31 August 1997, BBC Radio 1 played "The Last Stand" every 30 minutes for several hours, and it became the station's most-played track that day. The track was also played at the end of a much-publicised satirical re-enactment of the princess' funeral in September 2018. "One Night Stand" was used in a 1999 television advertisement for British Nuclear Fuels Ltd, shortly after The Aloof's dissolution. The group received an estimated fee of £20,000 for licensing the song, and the company's board account director Martin Stantiforth said they had received a number of calls about the song, thus confirming to him that "we must have been right [to use the song]."

== Critical reception ==
Professional ratings
Review scores
Source	Rating
AllMusic	4.5/5 stars
NME	8/10
Q	4/5 stars

Upon release, Sinking received critical acclaim; Ian Cranna of Q said that "dance music that actively engages the head and emotions is a rare beast but The Aloof are just such a treat... Haunting melancholy hooks and cyclical rhythms weave in and out of driving, evolving electrogrooves as bits of the past are remodelled and evocative touches added. NME's Iestyn George noted that the record was more laidback than the group's debut album, stating, "Sinking is apparently the result of less clubbing and more time listening to [Gary] Burns' stash of blues records... And the assertion that there's more to The Aloof than an explosive tribal drum break is borne out by vocalist Ricky Barrow's arresting brand of bitter lyrical melancholy." Martin James of Melody Maker awarded the album the magazine's "recommended" rating and said that "Sinking offers that rare thing — an album without fillers. Indeed, as an example of the waves of techno and indie breaking into each other, The Aloof are not so much 'Sinking' as surfing the sonic boundaries."

American magazine Keyboard felt that the "appropriately titled" album "gives you the feeling of sinking deeper and deeper into a very deep body of water." The reviewer felt that the 'swimming' beats, luscious arrangements and haunting vocals complement the music's exploration of dub, techno and trip hop, and concluded that "The Aloof help further redefine the concept of what a 'dance' album is." AllMusic's John Bush felt that Sinking was not as dark as Cover the Crime, but commented that it added "a contemplative earthiness gained from the blues and film music [...] while the orchestral flair of closing track 'The Last Stand' show The Aloof working through a variety of inspirations with a surplus of good ideas to back them up". In 2002, FutureMusic magazine wrote that the album showed the Aloof "at their best in many (albeit dark) territories." Covering the album in a guide to the big beat genre, Don McGonigle of Stylus Magazine wrote that the Aloof were an "utterly unique" dance-rock outfit that occasionally sounded "like Horace Andy backed by The Sabres of Paradise." He felt that "Barrow wrote like Mike Leigh turned loose with a pocket full of Amyl, yet sadly his distinctly grown-up take on relationships was never given the attention it deserved."

Select ranked the album 19th in their list of the top 30 albums of 1996, saying it "amounted to a protracted ode to getting bollocksed. And, combining dance-world resonance with traditional rock glower, [The Aloof] quietly made this year's Maxinquaye." Other publications who included the album in their year-end best albums lists included Melody Maker, who ranked it 16th, Rockdelux, who ranked it 32nd, and Vox, who ranked it 50th. Billboard international music editor Dominic Pride listed Sinking as the second best release of 1996 in the magazines' year-end critics poll, commenting "1997 will be theirs if there's any justice!" In the 2000 third edition of the All Time Top 1000 Albums, Sinking ranked at number 46 on a list of the all-time top 50 dance albums. Mojo magazine included the album in their "Buried Treasures" list, compiling albums they deem to be unfairly overlooked. In 2016, David Stubbs included "Abuse" in a playlist of 1996 songs for The Quietus, commenting: "Everybody getting wasted in 1996; only The Aloof had the honesty to talk about it."

== Track listing ==
All tracks written by The Aloof except where noted.

1. "Bittersweet" – 6:42
2. "Stuck on the Shelf" – 9:50
3. "Abuse" – 6:10
4. "Wish You Were Here" – 6:22
5. "Sinking" – 7:35
6. "One Night Stand" – 8:57
7. "Space Dust" – 2:24
8. "Hot Knives at Lunchtime" (Ricky Barrow, Gary Burns, Jagz Kooner, Dean Thatcher) – 5:14
9. "Losing It" – 7:23
10. "Sunk" – 2:38
11. "The Last Stand" – 9:06

== Personnel ==
The Aloof

- Ricky Barrow – production, mixing, vocals, songwriting
- Jagz Kooner – production, mixing, keyboards, programming
- Gary Burns – production, mixing, keyboards, bass, guitars
- Dean Thatcher – production, mixing, keyboards, DJ, programming

Additional personnel

- Richard Thair – drums, percussion, programming
- Caroline Dale – string arrangements on "The Last Stand"
