= All Change (album) =

Studio album by Cast
- Released: 16 October 1995
- Recorded: Manor, Oxfordshire, Sawmill, Fowey
- Genres: Power pop; Britpop
- Length: 60:00
- Label: Polydor (529312)
- Producer: John Leckie

Cast chronology
| All Change (1995) | Mother Nature Calls (1997) |

Singles from All Change
- 1. "Finetime" Released: 3 July 1995; 2. "Alright" Released: 18 September 1995; 3. "Sandstorm" Released: 8 January 1996; 4. "Walkaway" Released: 18 March 1996

All Change is the debut album by the English band Cast, released on 16 October 1995 by Polydor. It spawned four singles: "Finetime", "Alright", "Sandstorm" and "Walkaway". It became the highest selling debut album in the history of the Polydor label. A deluxe edition was released in November 2010.

== Critical reception ==
Professional ratings
Review scores
| Source | Rating |
|---|---|
| AllMusic | 4/5 stars |
| Entertainment Weekly | B |
| God Is in the TV | 4.5/5 |
| The Guardian | 3/5 stars |
| Mojo | 3/5 stars |
| NME | 5/10 |
| Q | 4/5 stars |
| Record Collector | 2/5 stars |
| Select | 4/5 |
| Wall of Sound | 84/100 |

The Irish Times wrote that "All Change has all the ingredients which made Cast's predecessors such a brilliant pop prospect: jangly riffs, heavenly hooks and a pervading sense of being wonderfully out of time."

Roch Parisien of AllMusic found the album to be "the perfect antidote to the inner rage fueling much American alternative rock", praising the production and Power's musicianship for carrying anthemic positivity and exuberant delivery, saying that "Cast transcends the hackneyed expectations of its environment, structure, and genetics through sheer, relentless quality of songcraft and performance." In a retrospective review, Jamie Atkins of Record Collector said the album "still has the most to offer", highlighting "Alright", "Sandstorm" and "Finetime"; though on tracks such as "Tell It Like It Is" and "Walkaway" "we get strong hints of future disappointments".

== Track listing ==
All tracks are written by John Power.

| No. | Title | Length |
|---|---|---|
| 1. | "Alright" | 3:37 |
| 2. | "Promised Land" | 4:37 |
| 3. | "Sandstorm" | 2:41 |
| 4. | "Mankind" | 3:44 |
| 5. | "Tell It Like It Is" | 4:41 |
| 6. | "Four Walls" | 3:09 |
| 7. | "Finetime" | 3:06 |
| 8. | "Back of My Mind" | 3:04 |
| 9. | "Walkaway" | 3:51 |
| 10. | "Reflections" | 3:05 |
| 11. | "History" | 4:25 |
| 12. | "Two of a Kind" (+ Instrumental hidden track) | 25:01 |

2010 Deluxe Edition CD1

1. "Alright"
2. "Promised Land"
3. "Sandstorm"
4. "Mankind"
5. "Tell It Like It Is"
6. "Four Walls"
7. "Finetime"
8. "Back of My Mind"
9. "Walkaway"
10. "Reflections"
11. "History"
12. "Two of a Kind"
13. "Instrumental (Original hidden track)"
14. "Flying"
15. "Better Man"
16. "Satellites"
17. "Follow Me Down"
18. "Meet Me"
19. "Hourglass"
20. "Mother"
21. "For So Long"

CD2

1. "Sandstorm" (Demo)
2. "Who You Gonna Ask?" (Demo)
3. "Two of a Kind" (Demo)
4. "Finetime" (Demo)
5. "Alright" (Demo)
6. "Follow Me Down" (Demo)
7. "Tell It Like it Is" (Demo)
8. "History" (Demo)
9. "Alright" (Demo)
10. "Flying" (Demo)
11. "Back of My Mind" (Alternate Mix)
12. "All My Days" (Outtake)
13. "Back of My Mind" (Live)
14. "Sandstorm" (Live)
15. "Reflections" (Live)
16. "Walk Away" (Live)
17. "Finetime" (Live)
18. "Alright" (Live)

== Personnel ==
Adapted from the liner notes of All Change.

Cast

- John Power – vocals, guitar
- Peter Wilkinson – backing vocals, bass
- Liam "Skin" Tyson – guitar
- Keith O'Neill – drums

Production

- John Leckie – producer, engineer, mixing
- Ash Alexander – assistant recording engineer (The Manor)

Additional musicians

- Jonathan Stone – strings (on "Walkaway")
- Vincent Needham – strings (on "Walkaway")

Artwork

- Norman Watson – photography
- Stylorouge – design

== Charts ==
| Chart (1995) | Peak position |
|---|---|
| UK Albums Chart | 7 |

== Certifications ==
| Region | Certification | Certified units/sales |
|---|---|---|
| United Kingdom (BPI) | Platinum | 300,000^{^} |
^{^} Shipments figures based on certification alone.

== Artwork ==
The cover photograph shows the band standing on a low wall outside the Royal Exchange in the heart of the City of London, London's financial district.
