= Only the Strongest Will Survive =

Studio album by Hurricane #1
- Released: 21 April 1999
- Genres: Britpop, alternative rock, electronic rock
- Length: 74:52
- Label: Creation
- Producers: Stephen Harris, Andy Bell

Hurricane #1 chronology
Step into My World EP (1997)	Only the Strongest Will Survive (1999)	Step into My World (2004)

Singles from Hurricane #1
- 1. "Only the Strongest Will Survive" Released: 9 February 1998; 2. "Rising Sign" Released: 12 October 1998; 3. "The Greatest High" Released: 22 March 1999; 4. "Remote Control" Released: 3 October 1999

Only the Strongest Will Survive is the second studio album by British rock band Hurricane #1. It was released on 21 April 1999. All songs were written by Andy Bell except "What Do I Know?" by Alex Lowe. It made number 55 in the UK album charts, and the top 20 in Japan.

The band attempted a different musical approach with this album, with a heavier influence of electronic sounds, drum machines and sampling. Remixers were approached to provide the many remixes of songs from this album.

== Track listing ==
All songs written by Andy Bell (Creation Songs), except "What Do I Know?", written by Alex Lowe (Creation Songs).

1. "Intro" - 1:54
2. "N.Y.C." - 4:06
3. "The Greatest High" - 3:58
4. "Remote Control" - 4:47
5. "The Price That We Pay" - 3:16
6. "Separation Sunday" - 5:33
7. "Rising Sign" - 7:02
8. "Only the Strongest Will Survive" - 4:43
9. "Long Way Down" - 6:39
10. "Twilight World" - 3:59
11. "Come Alive" - 4:05
12. "What Do I Know?" - 3:58
13. "Afterhours" - 6:00
14. "Outro/N.Y.C.2" - 14:45
15. "Sweet Insanity" - 4:17 (Japanese bonus track)
16. "You Wear It Well" - 4:13 (Japanese bonus track)

Note:

- In the CD version, the track 14 was finished at 3:14, continue with silence, and latter with the hidden track (sometimes considered as the reprise of the "Intro"), which begins at 6:16.
- In the digital version, the silence and the hidden track on track 14 were not included. However, some of the digital version was included the hidden track as separate track.
- Japanese CD version includes 2 bonus tracks, with the silence and the hidden track on track 14 were omitted for this version due to limitation capacity of CD.

== Personnel ==
- Alex Lowe – lead vocals
- Andy Bell – guitars, keyboards, backing vocals
- Will Pepper – bass
- Gareth Farmer – drums
- Steve Sidelnyck – programming, percussion
- Ian "Mac" McLagan – Hammond organ, Wurlitzer, piano, clarinet
- Idha – backing vocals on "Afterhours"

== Singles ==
Information
"Only the Strongest Will Survive"
- Released: 9 February 1998
- Writer: Andy Bell
- Producers: Stephen Harris, Andy Bell
"Only the Strongest Will Survive (mixes)"
- Released: 9 February 1998
- Writer: Andy Bell
- Producers: Stephen Harris, Andy Bell
"Rising Sign"
- Released: 12 October 1998
- Writer: Andy Bell
- Producers: Stephen Harris, Andy Bell
"Rising Sign (mixes)"
- Released: 12 October 1998
- Writer: Andy Bell
- Producers: Stephen Harris, Andy Bell
"The Greatest High"
- Released: 22 March 1999
- Writer: Andy Bell
- Producers: Stephen Harris, Andy Bell
"The Greatest High (mixes)"
- Released: 22 March 1999
- Writer: Andy Bell
- Producers: Stephen Harris, Andy Bell
"Remote Control"
- Released: 3 October 1999
- Writer: Andy Bell
- Producers: Stephen Harris, Andy Bell
"Remote Control (mixes)"
- Released: 3 October 1999
- Writer: Andy Bell
- Producers: Stephen Harris, Andy Bell
