= Flying (Cast song) =

1996 single by Cast

Single by Cast
- B-side: "Between the Eyes"; "For So Long"; "Walkaway (live - Feile Festival)"
- Released: 14 October 1996
- Label: Polydor
- Songwriter: John Power
- Producer: Brendan Lynch

Cast singles chronology
"Walkaway" (1996)	"Flying" (1996)	"Free Me" (1997)

"Flying" is the fifth single by Liverpool Britpop band Cast, fronted by ex the La's bassist John Power. The song was released as a standalone single on 14 October 1996 and reached number four on the UK singles chart, becoming the band's highest-charting single in the UK. The song was later included on the deluxe re-issue of their debut album, All Change, in 2010.

== Track listings ==
UK CD single

1. "Flying"
2. "Between the Eyes"
3. "For So Long"
4. "Walkaway" (live – Feil Festival)

UK 7-inch and cassette single

A1. "Flying"
B1. "Between the Eyes"
B2. "For So Long"

German CD single

1. "Flying"
2. "For So Long"

Japanese CD single

1. "Flying"
2. "Between the Eyes"
3. "For So Long"
4. "Finetime" (live)
5. "Four Walls" (live)
6. "Alright (live)"

== Personnel ==
Cast

- John Power – vocals, guitar
- Peter Wilkinson – backing vocals, bass
- Liam "Skin" Tyson – guitar
- Keith O'Neill – drums

Production

- Brendan Lynch – producer
- Mark "Spike" Stent – mixing
- Max Heyes – engineer

== Charts ==
Chart (1996)	Peak position
Europe (Eurochart Hot 100)	41
Israel (IBA)	14
Scottish Singles Sales (Official Charts)	3
UK Singles (Official Charts)	4

== Release history ==
Region	Date	Format(s)	Label(s)	Ref.
United Kingdom	14 October 1996	7-inch vinyl; CD; cassette	Polydor	
Japan	5 February 1997	CD	Polydor	
