= Just Another Illusion =

Single by Hurricane #1

from the album Hurricane #1
- Released: 23 June 1997
- Genre: Britpop
- Length: 5:40
- Label: Creation Records
- Songwriter: Andy Bell
- Producers: Stephen Harris, Andy Bell

Hurricane #1 singles chronology
"Step into My World" (1997)	"Just Another Illusion" (1997)	"Chain Reaction" (1997)

"Just Another Illusion Mixes"

"Just Another Illusion" is the second single from Hurricane #1's self-titled debut album. The song reached number 35 on the UK singles chart.

== Track listing ==
- CD CRESCD 264
1. "Just Another Illusion" - 5:40
2. "Touchdown" - 4:40
3. "Slapshot" - 4:59
- 7" CRE 264
1. "Just Another Illusion" - 5:40
2. "Touchdown" - 4:40

== Track listing (Limited Edition) ==
- CD CRESCD 264X
1. "Just Another Illusion" - 5:40
2. "Just Another Illusion (Midfield General #10 mix)" - 5:51
3. "Just Another Illusion (FC Kahuna mix)" - 6:43

== Personnel ==
"Just Another Illusion"
Produced by Stephen Harris and Andy Bell. Engineered and mixed by Stephen Harris.
"Touchdown"
Produced by Andy Bell and engineered by Gideon Karmiloff.
"Slapshot"
Produced by Andy Bell and engineered by Gideon Karmiloff.

"Just Another Illusion Mixes"
1, Produced by Stephen Harris and Andy Bell Engineered and mixed by Stephen Harris
3, Remix produced by Jon Nowell and Daniel Ormondroyd
All songs written by Andy Bell (Creation Songs)
Photography by Tim Page
Design by Phantom Industries
