= Bennet (band) =

British alternative rock band

- Origin: Reading, England
- Genres: Alternative rock
- Years active: 1993–1998, 2016
- Labels: Roadrunner Records
- Past members: Jonny Peer; Jason Applin; Kevin Moorey; Andy Bennett

Bennet were a British alternative rock band formed in 1993. They released two albums on Roadrunner Records, achieving mild success on the independent circuit in the UK. They were best known for their 1997 single "Mum's Gone to Iceland", the title of which came from a British television advertisement for the supermarket chain, Iceland. The band split up in 1998.

In 2016 they reformed with a new single due to be released in the summer, as well as a B Sides compilation.

== Discography ==
=== Albums ===
- Super Natural (1996)
- Street vs Science (1997)

=== Singles and EPs ===
- "Curly Shirly" (1995)
- "If You Met Me, Then You'd Like Me" (1996)
- "Colossal Man" (1996)
- "Someone Always Gets There First" (1996) – UK #69
- "Mum's Gone to Iceland" (1997) – UK #34
- "I Like Rock" (1997) – UK #79
- "Horse's Mouth" (1998)
