= The Aloof =

British electronic music group

- Origin: London, England
- Genres: Electronic
- Years active: 1990–2000
- Labels: Cowboy; Flaw; East West; Screaming Target
- Members: Ricky Barrow; Gary Burns; Jagz Kooner; Richard Thair; Dean Thatcher

The Aloof were a British electronic music group, formed in London, England, in 1990. The group consisted of Ricky Barrow, Gary Burns, Jagz Kooner, Richard Thair, and Dean Thatcher. They were active during the 1990s, and released four studio albums: Cover the Crime (1994), Sinking (1996), Seeking Pleasure (1998), and This Constant Chase for Thrills (1999).

On the day of the death of Diana Princess of Wales, BBC Radio 1 played their instrumental, "The Last Stand", every thirty minutes for several hours.

== Members ==
- Ricky Barrow – lead vocals
- Jagz Kooner – producer, keyboards, programming, engineering
- Gary Burns – producer, keyboards, bass, guitars
- Dean Thatcher – keyboards
- Richard Thair – drums, percussion

=== Touring and session members ===
- Ali Friend – bass (1994–1995)
- Nick Abnett – bass (1996–2000)
- Dave Stone – guitar (1996–2000)
- Nick Strasburg – keyboards (1994–2000)
- Will Blanchard – drums (1996)
- Simon Hanson – drums (1996–1999)
- Andrew Small – drums, electronic percussion (1998–2000)

== Discography ==
=== Studio albums ===
- Cover the Crime (1994)
- Sinking (1996)
- Seeking Pleasure (1998)
- This Constant Chase for Thrills (1999)

=== Singles ===
- "Never Get Out the Boat" (1991) UK No. 98
- "Scooter" "The World as One" (1991)
- "On a Mission" (1992) UK No. 64
- "Purity" (1992)
- "Purity (Remixes)" (1992)
- "Agent O" (1994)
- "Cover the Crime" (1994)
- "Mind" (1994)
- "Society" "Drum (Live Mix)" (1994)
- "Favelas" (1995) UK No. 95
- "Stuck on the Shelf" (1995)
- "Wish You Were Here..." (1996) UK No. 61
- "One Night Stand" (1996) UK No. 30
- "Sinking" (1997)
- "What I Miss the Most" (1998) UK No. 70
- "Infatuated" (1999)
- "Doing It for the Money" (2000)
