= Walkaway (song) =

1996 single by Cast

Single by Cast

from the album All Change
- B-side: "Fulfill"; "Mother"
- Released: 18 March 1996
- Length: 3:51
- Label: Polydor
- Songwriter: John Power
- Producer: John Leckie

Cast singles chronology
"Sandstorm" (1996)	"Walkaway" (1996)	"Flying" (1996)

"Walkaway" is the fourth single by Liverpool Britpop band Cast, fronted by ex-the La's bassist John Power. The song is taken from their debut album, All Change (1995). Released in March 1996, it reached number nine on the UK singles chart. The song would be used in the closing footage of the BBC's coverage of England's semi-final match of UEFA Euro 1996.

== Background ==
The song is about when you've done everything you can in a place or situation and you're doing an injustice to yourself by staying. There have been a couple of times in my life when people have said I'm making the wrong decision. Of course, there would have been a sadness within me about leaving the La's. But I don't think Walkaway was about me. The song becomes bigger than my story once it's heard by other people and they give it life themselves. I often see fans crying or snogging to it. Other people tell me they knew they had to leave their relationship after hearing it. Life can be cruel; it can break your heart. But I sing that line – "You never lose your dreams" – with sincerity, now more than ever. Once you take that decision to get out of a situation, you've got this whole unwritten page in front of you and can become anything you like again.

— John Power, songwriter of "Walkaway".

== Track listings ==
UK limited-edition 7-inch single

A1. "Walkaway"
A2. "Fulfill"
B1. "Finetime" (acoustic)

UK CD single

1. "Walkaway"
2. "Fulfill"
3. "Mother"

European CD single

1. "Walkaway"
2. "Fulfill"

Australian CD single

1. "Walkaway"
2. "Fulfill"
3. "Mother"
4. "Finetime" (acoustic)

== Personnel ==
Cast

- John Power – vocals, guitar
- Peter Wilkinson – backing vocals, bass
- Liam "Skin" Tyson – guitar
- Keith O'Neill – drums

Production

- John Leckie – producer
- Mark "Spike" Stent – mixing

Additional musicians

- Jonathan Stone – strings
- Vincent Needham – strings

== Charts ==
Chart (1996)	Peak position
Europe (Eurochart Hot 100)	41
Ireland (IRMA)	23
Israel (IBA)	4
Scottish Singles Sales (Official Charts)	7
UK Singles (Official Charts)	9

== Certifications ==
Region	Certification	Certified units/sales
United Kingdom (BPI)	Silver	200,000^{‡}
^{‡} Sales+streaming figures based on certification alone.
