= Hurricane No. 1 (album) =

Hurricane #1

Studio album by Hurricane #1
- Released: 15 September 1997 (UK); 28 October 1997 (US)
- Studio: Chapel, Lincoln
- Genre: Britpop, madchester, psychedelia, rock, space rock
- Length: 47:51
- Label: Creation
- Producer: Stephen Harris, Andy Bell

Hurricane #1 chronology
Hurricane #1 (1997)	Step into My World EP (1997)

Singles from Hurricane #1
- 1. "Step into My World" Released: 28 April 1997; 2. "Just Another Illusion" Released: 23 July 1997; 3. "Chain Reaction" Released: 25 August 1997; 4. "Monday Afternoon" Released: 1997

Hurricane #1 is the debut studio album by the British rock band Hurricane #1, released in 1997. It charted at number 11 in the UK album charts, and number seven in Scotland when compilations are disregarded (the album made No.17 with the compilations listed). The album was recorded at Lincoln's Chapel with producer Stephen Harris. The album was released in the US on 28 October 1997. The album eventually sold 100,000 copies.

== Reception ==
Professional ratings
Review scores
Source	Rating
AllMusic	3/5 stars
NME	5/10
Uncut	2/5 stars
Wall of Sound	47/100

The Guardian noted the "quality-crafted trad rock". The Observer labeled the album "ponderously paced retro-rock". Q named it one of the best albums of 1997.

== Track listing ==
All songs written by Andy Bell.

1. "Just Another Illusion" - 5:40
2. "Faces in a Dream" - 4:44
3. "Step into My World" - 5:01
4. "Mother Superior" - 5:11
5. "Let Go of the Dream" - 2:38
6. "Chain Reaction" - 3:41
7. "Lucky Man" - 5:15
8. "Strange Meeting" - 4:06
9. "Monday Afternoon" - 3:03
10. "Stand in Line" - 8:28

US bonus tracks

11. "Touchdown" - 4:40
12. "Smoke Rings" - 8:35

== Personnel ==
Hurricane No. 1

- Alex Lowe – vocals, guitar
- Andy Bell – lead guitar, keyboards, backing vocals
- Will Pepper – bass guitar
- Gareth Farmer – drums, percussion

Additional musicians

- Charlie Francis – strings arranger
- Chopper Harris – additional keyboards
- Idha – backing vocals (track 7)

Production and design

- Stephen Harris – producer, engineer, mixing
- Andy Bell – producer
- Naoki Tsuruta – front cover photography
- Paul Kelly – inside photography
- Phantom – design
