= On a Rope =

- Cover of the first single

Single by Rocket from the Crypt

from the album Scream, Dracula, Scream!
- Released: September 2, 1996
- Recorded: 1995
- Genre: Punk rock
- Length: 2:53
- Label: Elemental (ELM 38 CDS1, CSD2, CDS3)
- Songwriter(s): Rocket from the Crypt
- Producer(s): John Reis

Rocket from the Crypt singles chronology
"Young Livers" (1996)	"On a Rope" (1996)	"When in Rome (Do the Jerk)" (1998)

"On a Rope" is a song by the American punk rock band Rocket from the Crypt, released as the third single from their 1995 album Scream, Dracula, Scream! It was released as three separate CD singles by Elemental Records, which combined to form a single set containing three versions of "On a Rope", five cover songs, and a four-song session recorded with Mark Radcliffe at the BBC that was originally broadcast May 26, 1996. "On a Rope" was Rocket from the Crypt's highest-charting single, peaking at number 12 on the UK Singles Chart. A music video for the song received play on MTV and MTV Europe.

== Track listing ==
Disc 1
No.	Title	Writer(s)	Length
1.	"On a Rope"	Rocket from the Crypt	2:53
2.	"Alone" (originally performed by the Shadows of Knight)	Shadows of Knight
3.	"Who Needs You" (originally performed by The Real Kids)	The Real Kids
4.	"Young Livers" (Mark Radcliffe session)	Rocket from the Crypt

Disc 2
No.	Title	Writer(s)	Length
1.	"On a Rope" (live from The White Room)	Rocket from the Crypt
2.	"Alergic Reaction" (originally performed by The Drags)	The Drags
3.	"Transcendent Crankiness" (originally performed by The Nephews)	Tim Elison
4.	"Suit City" (Mark Radcliffe session)	Rocket from the Crypt

Disc 3
No.	Title	Writer(s)	Length
1.	"On a Rope" (live from Ghetto Box Rock '91 session)	Rocket from the Crypt
2.	"You and I" (originally performed by the Silver Apples)	Simeon Coxe III, Danny Taylor
3.	"Don't Darlene" (Mark Radcliffe session)	Rocket from the Crypt
4.	"Lorna Doom" (Mark Radcliffe session)	Rocket from the Crypt

== Personnel ==
- Speedo (John Reis) - guitar, lead vocals
- ND (Andy Stamets) - guitar, backing vocals
- Petey X (Pete Reichert) - bass, backing vocals
- Apollo 9 (Paul O'Beirne) - saxophone, percussion, backing vocals
- JC 2000 (Jason Crane) - trumpet, percussion, backing vocals
- Atom (Adam Willard) - drums
- Donnell Cameron - engineering, recording of "On a Rope"
- Eddie Miller - assistant engineer of "On a Rope"
- Andy Wallace - mixing of "On a Rope"
- Geoff Harrington and Mark Arnold - recording and mixing of "Alone", "Who Needs You", "Alergic Reaction", "Transcendent Crankiness", and "You and I"
- Pat Coope and Chris Lee - engineers of Mark Radcliffe session
- Savage - art, design

== Chart positions ==
Chart (1996)	Peak position
UK Singles (OCC)	12
UK Indie (Music Week)	1
