= Hurricane No. 1 =

British rock band

Hurricane #1
- Origin: Oxford, England
- Genres: Alternative rock, Britpop
- Years active: 1996–1999, 2014–present
- Labels: Creation, Tapete
- Members: Alex Lowe; Jon Robert; Stuart Fletcher; Chris Campbell
- Past members: Andy Bell; Gareth "Gaz" Farmer; Will Pepper; Lucas Mariani; Chris Mullin; Carlo Mariani
- Website: Facebook

Hurricane #1 are an English rock band, formed in Oxford in 1996. The band were formed by former Ride guitarist Andy Bell, along with vocalist / guitarist Alex Lowe, bassist Will Pepper and drummer Gareth "Gaz" Farmer. After releasing two albums, Hurricane #1 (1997) and Only the Strongest Will Survive (1999), the band broke up.

A new lineup of the band, fronted by Lowe, formed in 2014, and has released four further albums to date.

== History ==
=== Formation, Hurricane #1 and Only the Strongest Will Survive (1996–99) ===
Wishing to perform the later-day sound of his former band Ride, vocalist/guitarist Andy Bell formed Hurricane #1. Signed to Creation Records (home of bands such as Oasis, The Jesus and Mary Chain and Primal Scream) they released their debut album in 1997, entitled Hurricane #1. This included their first single, "Step into My World", which reached number 29 in the UK Singles Chart (and a Paul Oakenfold remix of which reached number 19 in 1997), and other less successful singles "Just Another Illusion" and "Chain Reaction".

In 1999, the follow-up album Only the Strongest Will Survive was released. Its title track replicated the success of "Just Another Illusion", reaching number 19 in the singles chart.

=== Break up (1999–2014) ===
In 1999, Bell parted ways with Hurricane #1, briefly joining Gay Dad on guitar, before becoming the bass player for Oasis.

In 2004, a double disc compilation of their songs was released, entitled Step into My World.

Former Hurricane #1 vocalist / guitarist Lowe has pursued a solo career, and has released three albums to date. In 2007, Lowe announced a new project called Garage Flowers, and a single, "Where To Begin", was released via iTunes. In 2013, Lowe formed a band called Gun Club Cemetery, which released a self-titled album the same year.

=== Reformation (2014–present) ===
In November 2014, it was announced that Alex Lowe had put together a new band under the Hurricane #1 name; himself backed by entirely different musicians. The line-up, fronted by Lowe, featured the Mariani brothers, Carlo and Lucas, on guitar and bass respectively, and Chris Campbell on drums.

The band's third album, Find What You Love and Let It Kill You, was released on 26 November 2015 through German-based label Tapete. Bell features on the track "Think of the Sunshine". Lowe wrote the album while he was undergoing treatment for cancer in hospital. Lowe explained that "When you are wired up to chemo and radio therapy, the last thing you want to do is wallow in it and feel sorry for yourself so I had the idea that the album should be happy and not too dark."

Melodic Rainbows, the band's fourth album, was released on 12 October 2016 in Japan. The album was released in the UK in November 2017. The band played the Beano on the Sea festival in September and the Shiine On Weekender in November. After Melodic Rainbows was released, bass player Lucas Mariani decided to quit the band, and was replaced by Chris Mullin. Later, Mullin left the band, and was replaced himself by former The Seahorses' bassist Stuart Fletcher in October 2018.

The band toured in early 2018. They released a single via download every month from September 2017 until some time in 2018. Guitarist Carlo Mariani left the band in early 2019, and was replaced by Jon Roberts. The band's fifth studio album, Buddah at the Gas Pump was released on 12 July 2019, and a sixth, Backstage Waiting To Go On, on 16 June 2023.

== Discography ==
Studio albums

- Hurricane #1 (1997)
- Only the Strongest Will Survive (1999)
- Find What You Love and Let It Kill You (2015)
- Melodic Rainbows (2016)
- Buddah At The Gas Pump (2019)
- Backstage Waiting To Go On (2023)

== Members ==
=== Current ===
- Alex Lowe: lead vocals, guitar (1996–1999, 2014–present)
- Chris Campbell: drums (2014–present)
- Stuart Fletcher: bass (2018–present)
- Jon Roberts: guitar (2019–present)

=== Past ===
- Andy Bell: guitar, vocals, keyboards (1996–1999)
- Will Pepper: bass (1996–1999)
- Gareth "Gaz" Farmer: drums (1996–1999)
- Carlo Mariani: guitar (2014–2019)
- Lucas Mariani: bass (2014–2016)
- Chris Mullin: bass (2016–2018)
