= Step into My World (song) =

"Step Into My World"

Single by Hurricane #1

from the album Hurricane #1
- Released: 28 April 1997
- Genre: Britpop
- Length: 5:01
- Label: Creation Records
- Songwriter(s): Andy Bell
- Producer(s): Stephen Harris, Andy Bell

Hurricane #1 singles chronology
"Step Into My World" (1997)	"Just Another Illusion" (1997)

"Step into My World" is a song by Britpop band Hurricane #1. It was released on 28 April 1997 on Creation Records and charted at #29 in the UK Singles Chart. A remix by Perfecto peaked at #19 in the UK Singles Chart in November 1997. It was used as continuity music on Match of the Day in 1997 and 1998.

== Track listing ==
- CD CRESCD 253
1. "Step Into My World" - 5:01
2. "Don't Look Away" - 3:57
3. "Smoke Rings" - 8:35
- 7" CRE 253
1. "Step Into My World" - 5:01
2. "Don't Look Away" - 3:57
