= Sandstorm (Cast song) =

1996 single by Cast

Single by Cast

from the album All Change
- B-side: "Hourglass"; "Back of My Mind" (live); "Alright" (live)
- Released: 8 January 1996
- Genre: Britpop
- Length: 2:41
- Label: Polydor
- Songwriter: John Power
- Producer: John Leckie

Cast singles chronology
| "Alright" (1995) | "Sandstorm" (1996) | "Walkaway" (1996) |

"Sandstorm" is a song by the Liverpool Britpop band Cast. The song is the third single released from the band's debut studio album, All Change (1995). "Sandstorm" peaked at number eight on the UK Singles Chart in January 1996.

== Track listings ==
UK, Australian, and Japanese CD single

1. "Sandstorm"
2. "Hourglass"
3. "Back of My Mind" (live at Abbey Road Studios)
4. "Alright" (live)

UK 7-inch and cassette single

A1. "Sandstorm"
B1. "Hourglass"
B2. "Back of My Mind" (live at Abbey Road Studios)

European CD single

1. "Sandstorm"
2. "Hourglass"

== Personnel ==
Cast

- John Power – vocals, guitar
- Peter Wilkinson – backing vocals, bass
- Liam "Skin" Tyson – guitar
- Keith O'Neill – drums

Production

- John Leckie – producer, mixing

== Charts ==
| Chart (1996) | Peak position |
|---|---|
| Europe (Eurochart Hot 100) | 20 |
| Scottish Singles Sales (Official Charts) | 6 |
| UK Singles (Official Charts) | 8 |

== Release history ==
| Region | Date | Format(s) | Label(s) | Ref. |
|---|---|---|---|---|
| United Kingdom | 8 January 1996 | 7-inch vinyl; CD; cassette | Polydor | |
| Japan | 10 February 1996 | CD | Polydor | |
