= Alright (Cast song) =

1995 single by Cast

Single by Cast

from the album All Change
- B-side: "Follow Me Down"; "Meet Me"
- Released: 18 September 1995
- Label: Polydor
- Songwriter: John Power
- Producer: John Leckie

Cast singles chronology
"Finetime" (1995)	"Alright" (1995)	"Sandstorm" (1996)

"Alright" is the second single by the Liverpool Britpop band Cast, fronted by ex-La's bassist John Power. The song was the second single taken from their debut album, All Change (1995), and reached number 13 on the UK Singles Chart.

John Power wrote the song while still a member of the La's, and the song was performed live in 1991. The song appears on their compilation box set Callin' All (released in 2010) as part of a 23 April 1991 live set performed at The Marquee Club.

== Track listings ==
Standard

1. "Alright"
2. "Follow Me Down"
3. "Meet Me"

European CD single

1. "Alright"
2. "Meet Me"

== Personnel ==
Cast

- John Power – vocals, guitar
- Peter Wilkinson – backing vocals, bass
- Liam "Skin" Tyson – guitar
- Keith O'Neill – drums

Production

- John Leckie – producer, mixing

== Charts ==
Chart (1995)	Peak position
Europe (Eurochart Hot 100)	51
Scottish Singles Sales (Official Charts)	8
UK Singles (Official Charts)	13

== Release history ==
Region	Date	Format(s)	Label(s)	Ref.
United Kingdom	18 September 1995	7-inch vinyl; CD; cassette	Polydor	
Australia	30 October 1995	CD; cassette	Polydor	
