= Finetime =

1995 single by Cast

Single by Cast

from the album All Change
- B-side: "Better Man"; "Satellites"
- Released: 3 July 1995
- Length: 3:06
- Label: Polydor
- Songwriter: John Power
- Producer: John Leckie

Cast singles chronology
"Finetime" (1995)	"Alright" (1995)

"Finetime" is the debut single of Liverpudlian Britpop band Cast, fronted by ex La's bassist John Power. The song was issued as the lead single from their debut album, All Change, on 3 July 1995 and reached number 17 on the UK Singles Chart. "Finetime" was first performed acoustically by John Power with the La's at a Liverpool free festival.

== Track listing ==
1. "Finetime" – 3:06
2. "Better Man" – 2:59
3. "Satellites" – 3:40

== Personnel ==
Cast

- John Power – vocals, guitar
- Peter Wilkinson – backing vocals, bass
- Liam "Skin" Tyson – guitar
- Keith O'Neill – drums

Production

- John Leckie – producer, mixing

== Charts ==
Chart (1995)	Peak position
Europe (Eurochart Hot 100)	44
Scottish Singles Sales (Official Charts)	14
UK Singles (Official Charts)	17
