= Yeah Yeah Yeah (Cast album) =

2026 studio album by Cast (band)

Studio album by Cast
- Released: 30 January 2026
- Genre: Rock
- Length: 42:59
- Label: Scruff of the Neck
- Producer: Youth

Cast chronology
Love Is the Call (2024)	Yeah Yeah Yeah (2026)

Singles from Yeah Yeah Yeah
- 1. "Poison Vine" Released: 7 July 2025; 2. "Way It's Gotta Be (Oh Yeah)" Released: 22 August 2025; 3. "Calling Out Your Name" Released: 24 October 2025; 4. "Free Love" Released: 10 December 2025

Yeah Yeah Yeah is the eighth studio album by the English band Cast, released on 30 January 2026. Produced by Youth, it is the first album recorded with guitarist Jay Lewis, alongside the rest of the band, that is; singer and rhythm guitarist John Power, lead guitarist Liam "Skin" Tyson, and drummer Keith O'Neill. Two tracks also include features from American soul singer P.P. Arnold. Yeah Yeah Yeah debuted and peaked at #8 in the UK charts, this was Cast's highest charting album and the first album to break the UK top 10 since 1999's Magic Hour.

== Background and release ==
The first single from the album, Poison Vine, was released on 7 July 2025 towards the beginning of their supporting tour as part of the Oasis Live '25 Tour which kicked off on 4 July. Cast performed the track live for the first time 4 days after its release in Heaton Park, Manchester.

The album was announced on 15 July 2025, with an announced release date of 30 January 2026. On its announcement, frontman John Power commented "Yeah Yeah Yeah" just arrived out of the blue. There was a window of opportunity – Youth was free, the studio was free, and the band were free – and I thought, let providence prevail."

Three further singles were released to promote the album, before its eventual release on 30 January 2026. It is the first release from the band after they had signed to Manchester independent record label Scruff of the Neck in July of 2025.

== Track listing ==
All songs written by John Power.

Yeah Yeah Yeah track listing
No.	Title	Length
1.	"Poison Vine (with P.P. Arnold)"	4:59
2.	"Don't Look Away"	4:42
3.	"Calling Out Your Name"	4:50
4.	"Free Love"	4:42
5.	"Say Something New"	4:28
6.	"Way It's Gotta Be (Oh Yeah) (with P.P. Arnold)"	3:29
7.	"Devil and The Deep"	3:00
8.	"Weight Of The World"	3:46
9.	"Teardrops"	5:12
10.	"Birds Heading South"	4:46
Total length:		42:59

== Personnel ==
Cast

- John Power – guitars, bass, lead and backing vocals
- Liam "Skin" Tyson – guitars, backing vocals
- Keith O'Neill – drums, backing vocals
- Jay Lewis – guitars, bass, backing vocals

Additional musicians

- P.P. Arnold – vocals

Production

- Youth – producer

== Charts ==
Chart performance for Yeah Yeah Yeah
Chart (2026)	Peak position
Scottish Albums (Official Charts)	3
UK Albums (Official Charts)	8
UK Independent Albums (Official Charts)	3
