= Troubled Times =

Studio album by Cast
- Released: 2 November 2011
- Recorded: Real World Studios, The Bee Barn (Bala), The Premises Studios, The Yard (London), The Viper Studio
- Genre: Rock
- Label: Cast Recordings (CASTRECCD1)
- Producers: John Leckie, Paul Hemmings

Cast chronology
The Complete BBC Sessions (2007)	Troubled Times (2011)	Kicking Up the Dust (2017)

Troubled Times is the fifth album by the English band Cast, released digitally on 2 November 2011. It is the first album they recorded since reuniting in 2010 for shows celebrating the 15th anniversary of their debut, All Change. It is also the last album recorded with founding bassist Pete Wilkinson, who left the band in 2014.

== Background ==
Nearly a decade after Cast split up shortly after the release of their fourth album Beetroot, lead singer and songwriter John Power had already released three solo albums when he started writing material that he felt was more suited to the band. After spending the years since the split shying away from Cast's music, Power decided it was time to play the songs again, especially with debut album All Change's impending 15th anniversary. He then got in touch with the other band members: guitarist Liam "Skin" Tyson, bassist Pete Wilkinson and drummer Keith O'Neill. Following the All Change 15th Anniversary Tour around the U.K. in November and December 2010, the band started work on the new album with fans helping to fund the recording through PledgeMusic, with a percentage of the profits donated to the charity Shelter.

== Recording ==
Cast began recording at Real World Studios on 3 May 2011 under the supervision of John Leckie, who had previously produced the band's first two albums, All Change and Mother Nature Calls. Keith O'Neill was absent from the album sessions due to his work as a tour manager. As a result, the album features drumming by Steve Pilgrim, who had played in Power's solo band and would also fill in for O'Neill on Cast tours since the band's reformation. Tracking on the album was completed in September 2011, with Power taking time off in July due to having a baby.

Days after mastering was complete, the album was released digitally on 2 November 2011 to fans who had helped fund the album through PledgeMusic. Troubled Times was finally released physically on 5 March 2012, with two bonus tracks.

== Reception ==
Professional ratings
Review scores
Source	Rating
AllMusic	3/5 stars
Clash	3/10
Drowned in Sound	0/10
NME	3.5/5 stars
Record Collector	1/5 stars
The Skinny	2/5 stars

In a 3-star rating, Stephen Thomas Erlewine of AllMusic described the album as "workingman's pop: there's no flair, nothing flashy, but it gets the job done". Liam Cash of NME was also somewhat positive, writing that the album contained "a dozen super-straight-ahead guitar-pop songs that are bright, breezily likeable and pretty undeniably full of life".

Jamie Atkins of Record Collector was critical of Power being "keen to inform the world that things these days are vaguely not 'alright'" without substantiating as to why, using his "undoubted talent to produce abstract, clichéd drivel to hammer this point home". Dan Lucas of Drowned in Sound panned the album with a 0/10 rating, characterising the track listing as "anodyne four chord strum-alongs so unambitious [that] they all manage to blur into one", and further describing Power's lyrics as "banal and trite".

== Track listing ==
All songs written by John Power.

No.	Title	Length
1.	"Bow Down"	3:19
2.	"Troubled Thoughts"	2:59
3.	"The Sky's Got a Gaping Hole"	3:03
4.	"See That Girl"	3:33
5.	"Not Afraid of the World"	4:57
6.	"Silver and Gold"	3:40
7.	"Bad Waters"	3:51
8.	"Hold On Tight"	3:22
9.	"A Boy Like Me"	2:48
10.	"Brother Fighting Brother"	2:48
11.	"Time Bomb"	3:30
12.	"Tear It Apart (All Over Again)"	3:31

Bonus tracks

CD edition
No.	Title	Length
13.	"Time Bomb" (Rough Acoustic Attic Recording)	3:31
14.	"Bad Waters" (Rough Acoustic Attic Recording)	4:04

Digital edition
No.	Title	Length
13.	"Time Bomb" (Rough Acoustic Attic Recording)	3:31
14.	"Troubled Thoughts" (Rough Acoustic Attic Recording)	2:58

== Personnel ==
Cast

- John Power – acoustic guitars, vocals
- Liam "Skin" Tyson – electric guitars, 12-string acoustic, lap steel, slide guitar, backing vocals
- Peter Wilkinson – bass guitar, backing vocals
- Keith O'Neill – drums (did not play on the album)

Additional musician

- Steve Pilgrim – drums

Production

- John Leckie - producer, engineer, mixing
- Paul Hemmings - producer (tracks 13 and 14)
