= Live the Dream =

1997 single by Cast

Single by Cast

from the album Mother Nature Calls
- B-side: "Effectomatic Who"; "Hold On"; "Flow"; "On the Run" (demo)
- Released: 1 September 1997
- Label: Polydor
- Songwriter: John Power
- Producer: John Leckie

Cast singles chronology
"Guiding Star" (1997)	"Live the Dream" (1997)	"I'm So Lonely" (1997)

"Live the Dream" is the eighth single by the Liverpool britpop band Cast, fronted by ex La's bassist John Power. It was released on 1 September 1997 as the third single from Cast's second studio album, Mother Nature Calls (1997), and reached number seven on the UK Singles Chart, tying "Free Me" as the album's highest-charting single.

== Track listings ==
UK CD1

1. "Live the Dream"
2. "Effectomatic Who"
3. "Hold On"
4. "Live the Dream" (acoustic)

UK CD2

1. "Live the Dream"
2. "Flow"
3. "On the Run" (demo)

UK 7-inch and cassette single

1. "Live the Dream"
2. "Hold On"
3. "Flow"

== Personnel ==
Cast

- John Power – vocals, guitar
- Peter Wilkinson – backing vocals, bass
- Liam "Skin" Tyson – guitar
- Keith O'Neill – drums

Production

- John Leckie – production
- Mark "Spike" Stent – mixing

== Charts ==
Chart (1997)	Peak position
Europe (Eurochart Hot 100)	68
Scottish Singles Sales (Official Charts)	5
UK Singles (Official Charts)	7
