= Beat Mama =

1999 single by Cast

Single by Cast

from the album Magic Hour
- B-side: "Get on You"; "3 Nines Are 28"; "Hoedown"; "Whisky Song"
- Released: 26 April 1999
- Studio: Ridge Farm (West Sussex, England); Air Lyndhurst (Hampstead, London)
- Length: 4:10
- Label: Polydor
- Songwriter: John Power
- Producer: Gil Norton

Cast singles chronology
"I'm So Lonely" (1997)	"Beat Mama" (1999)	"Magic Hour" (1999)

"Beat Mama" is a song by Liverpool Britpop band Cast, fronted by ex La's bassist John Power. Released on 26 April 1999, the song peaked at number nine on the UK Singles Chart, becoming the band's seventh and final UK top-10 hit.

== Track listings ==
UK CD1

1. "Beat Mama"
2. "Get on You"
3. "3 Nines Are 28"

UK CD2

1. "Beat Mama"
2. "Hoedown"
3. "Whisky Song"

European CD single

1. "Beat Mama" (radio edit)
2. "Get on You"
3. "Hoedown"
4. "Whisky Song"

== Credits and personnel ==
Credits are lifted from the UK CD1 and Magic Hour liner notes.

Studios

- Recorded at Ridge Farm Studio (West Sussex, England) and Air Studios Lyndhurst (Hampstead, London)
- Mixed at The Church (London, England)
- Mastered at Gateway Mastering (Portland, Maine, US)

Cast

- John Power – writing, vocals, guitar
- Liam Tyson – guitar
- Peter Wilkinson – bass guitar
- Keith O'Neill – drums

Production

- Gil Norton – production, mixing
- Danton Supple – engineering, mixing
- Bob Ludwig – mastering

== Charts ==
Chart (1999)	Peak position
Europe (Eurochart Hot 100)	43
Scottish Singles Sales (Official Charts)	5
UK Singles (Official Charts)	9
