= Desert Drought =

Single by Cast

from the album Beetroot
- B-side: "Cobwebs"
- Released: 16 July 2001
- Label: Polydor (587176)
- Songwriter: John Power
- Producers: John Power, Tristin Norwell

Cast singles chronology
"Magic Hour" (1999)	"Desert Drought" (2001)

"Desert Drought" is the twelfth single by the Liverpool britpop band Cast, fronted by ex La's bassist John Power.

== Formats and track listings ==
CD single (1)

1. "Desert Drought"
2. "Cobwebs"
3. "Desert Drought" (Desert Dry Mouth mix)
4. "Desert Drought" (CD-Rom mix)

CD single (2)

1. "Desert Drought"
2. "Curtains" (Purple Curtains remix)
3. "Desert Drought" (Solomon remix)

== Personnel ==
Cast

- John Power – vocals, guitar
- Peter Wilkinson – backing vocals, bass
- Liam "Skin" Tyson – guitar
- Keith O'Neill – drums

Production

- John Power – producer, mixing
- Tristin Norwell – producer, mixing

== Chart performance ==
Chart (2001)	Peak position
UK Singles (Official Charts)	45
