= Live at the Luminaire =

Live album by Howard Eliott Payne
- Released: 21 September 2009 (digital)
- Genre: Folk
- Label: Move City Records

Howard Eliott Payne chronology
Bright Light Ballads (2009)	Live at the Luminaire (2009)

Live at the Luminaire is a digital-only live acoustic album by English singer-songwriter Howard Eliott Payne, formerly of the Liverpool band the Stands. It features live versions of songs from Payne's debut solo album Bright Light Ballads as well as from the Stands' first album All Years Leaving.

The album was recorded at The Luminaire in Kilburn, London and released on 21 September 2009.

== Track listing ==
All songs written by Howard Eliott Payne.

1. "I Just Want to Spend Some Time with You"
2. "Seven Years"
3. "Walk by My Side"
4. "Come Down Easy"
5. "Until Morning"
6. "I Need You"
7. "You Can't Hurt Me Anymore"
8. "All Years Leaving"
9. "Lay Down Your Tune for Me"
