= Love Is the Call =

2024 studio album by Cast (band)

Studio album by Cast
- Released: 16 February 2024
- Studio: Space Mountain Studios (Granada)
- Genre: Rock
- Length: 42:00
- Label: Cast
- Producer: Youth

Cast chronology
Kicking Up the Dust (2017)	Love Is the Call (2024)	Yeah Yeah Yeah (2026)

Singles from Love Is The Call
- 1. "Love Is The Call" Released: 26 October 2023; 2. "Love You Like I Do" Released: 30 November 2023; 3. "Faraway" Released: 5 January 2024

Love Is the Call is the seventh studio album by the English band Cast, released on 16 February 2024. Produced by Youth, it is their first album recorded as a three-piece of singer and rhythm guitarist John Power, lead guitarist Liam "Skin" Tyson and drummer Keith O'Neill, with Power also playing bass on an album for the first time since he was in his previous band The La's. Reaching #22 in the UK charts, this was Cast's highest charting album since 1999's Magic Hour.

== Background ==
John Power spent 2021 writing for what he described as "may well be Cast's last ever album." By the end of the year he had almost finished making demos for the new album, with plans to spend 2022 recording "like if Cast were doing a debut album now."

== Recording ==
Since Power felt that the album was a return "to the space I sat in between The La's and Cast," he decided to play bass on it for the first time since he was in his former band. This meant that Cast recorded as a three-piece with Youth on board as producer, and work on the album wrapped up in late 2023. The album took approximately three weeks to record.

== Release ==
On 28 October 2023 Cast released the title track and first single from Love Is the Call, with Power describing the new album as feeling like "a missing link" between his time in The La's and Cast's debut All Change. Second single "Love You Like I Do" followed on 5 December along with the confirmation of a 16 February 2024 release date for the album. "Faraway", the third single from Love Is the Call, was released on 5 January 2024.

== Critical reception ==
Professional ratings
Aggregate scores
Source	Rating
Metacritic	77/100
Review scores
Source	Rating
AllMusic	4/5 stars
Classic Rock	4/5 stars
Mojo	4/5 stars
Record Collector	3/5 stars
Uncut	4/5 stars
XS Noize	5/5 stars

Love Is the Call received a score of 77 out of 100 on review aggregator Metacritic based on 5 critics' reviews, indicating "generally favorable" reception. Stephen Thomas Erlewine of AllMusic felt in a 4-star review that "the sturdiness of the craft and its faithfulness to Cast's body of work means Love Is the Call could indeed function as a handsome farewell, but it also suggests the band might have more plenty of road left ahead of them.” In a positive review, Uncut wrote that "weird details stud essentially conventional songs by a band who sound energised, and in many ways The Coral's true kin." Stuart Evans of XS Noize, in a 5-star review, contended that "Love Is the Call is the sound of a band reborn; it feels like a debut record, a new beginning; very few artists can say that this far into their career; for Cast, however, they are doing more than Alright."

In a 3-star review, Record Collector remarked that "their seventh effort might start with short, low-key ballad Bluebird but that turns out to be a complete misnomer for an album chock-full of effervescent indie anthems and buoyant guitars.

== Track listing ==
All songs written by John Power.

Love Is the Call track listing
No.	Title	Length
1.	"Bluebird"	1:29
2.	"First Smile Ever"	4:34
3.	"The Rain That Falls"	4:29
4.	"Faraway"	5:08
5.	"Love You Like I Do"	4:22
6.	"Love Is the Call"	3:43
7.	"Starry Eyes"	3:55
8.	"I Have Been Waiting"	3:15
9.	"Look Around"	2:40
10.	"Time Is Like a River"	4:12
11.	"Tomorrow Call My Name"	4:13
Total length:		42:00

== Personnel ==
Cast

- John Power – guitars, bass, lead and backing vocals
- Liam "Skin" Tyson – guitars, backing vocals
- Keith O'Neill – drums, backing vocals

Additional musicians

- Manolo Iglesias Ferrer, Adrián Robles Sánchez, Antonio Parejo Ibáñez – brass section

Production

- Youth – producer
- Michael Randell – engineer
- Eliot Verreux – assistant engineer
- Charlie Russell – mixing

== Charts ==
Chart performance for Love Is the Call
Chart (2024)	Peak position
Scottish Albums (Official Charts)	5
UK Albums (Official Charts)	22
UK Independent Albums (Official Charts)	3
