= I'm So Lonely (Cast song) =

1997 single by Cast

Single by Cast

from the album Mother Nature Calls
- B-side: "The Things You Make Me Do"; "Never Gonna Tell You What to Do" (live); "History" (remix); "Theme From"
- Released: 3 November 1997
- Label: Polydor
- Songwriter: John Power
- Producer: John Leckie

Cast singles chronology
"Live the Dream" (1997)	"I'm So Lonely" (1997)	"Beat Mama" (1999)

"I'm So Lonely" is the ninth single by the Liverpool britpop band Cast, fronted by ex La's bassist John Power. The single was released on 3 November 1997 and peaked at number 14 on the UK Singles Chart.

== Track listings ==
UK CD1

1. "I'm So Lonely"
2. "The Things You Make Me Do"
3. "Never Gonna Tell You What to Do" (live)
4. "History" (Lo Fidelity All Stars remix)

UK CD2

1. "I'm So Lonely"
2. "Theme From"
3. "History" (Headrillaz remix)

UK cassette single

1. "I'm So Lonely"
2. "The Things You Make Me Do"
3. "Theme From"

== Personnel ==
Cast

- John Power – vocals, guitar
- Peter Wilkinson – backing vocals, bass
- Liam "Skin" Tyson – guitar
- Keith O'Neill – drums

Production

- John Leckie – production
- Pete Lewis – mixing

== Charts ==
Chart (1997)	Peak position
Europe (Eurochart Hot 100)	83
Scottish Singles Sales (Official Charts)	13
UK Singles (Official Charts)	14
