= Kicking Up the Dust =

Studio album by Cast
- Released: 21 April 2017
- Studios: Motor Museum, Liverpool
- Genre: Rock
- Label: Cast Recordings (CST001LP)
- Producer: Al Groves

Cast chronology
Troubled Times (2011)	Kicking Up the Dust (2017)	Love Is the Call (2024)

Kicking Up the Dust is the sixth studio album by the English band Cast, released on 21 April 2017. Produced by Al Groves, it is their first and only album recorded with bassist Jay Lewis, replacing founding member Pete Wilkinson who left the band in 2014. It also marks the return to recording for drummer Keith O'Neill, who had rejoined with the other members when the band reunited in 2010 but was absent from sessions for previous album Troubled Times due to his work as a tour manager.

== Track listing ==
All songs written by John Power. Music by Cast.

No.	Title	Length
1.	"Kicking Up the Dust"	4:01
2.	"Roar"	4:05
3.	"Do That"	4:08
4.	"Further Down the Road"	3:50
5.	"Paper Chains"	5:25
6.	"Birdcage"	4:58
7.	"Every Little Thing You Do"	4:08
8.	"Baby Blue Eyes"	3:58
9.	"How Can We Lose"	5:19
10.	"Clear Blue Water"	4:05
11.	"Out of My Hands"	4:24

== Personnel ==
Cast

- John Power – guitars, vocals
- Liam "Skin" Tyson – guitars, backing vocals, pedal steel
- Keith O'Neill – drums
- Jay Lewis – bass, backing vocals, Fender Rhodes (track 5), organ (track 6)

Production

- Al Groves – producer, mixing
- Mike Marsh – mastering
- James Mellor – studio assistant
- Jennifer John – backing vocal arrangement (track 5)
