= Howie Payne =

English musician (born 1970)

- Payne (right) performing with Noel Gallagher

Background information
- Born: Howard Elliot Payne; 5 November 1970 (age 55); Liverpool, England
- Genres: Alternative rock, indie rock, folk, acoustic Americana
- Occupations: Musician, singer-songwriter, record producer
- Instruments: Vocals, guitar, bass guitar, piano, harmonica
- Years active: 1992–present
- Labels: Ultimate, The Echo Label, Move City Records, BMG Rights Management, Full Stack Records

Howard Elliot Payne (born 5 November 1970) is an English musician, singer-songwriter and record producer, formerly of the Stands.

Following the Stands' split, Payne embarked on a solo career under the name Howard Eliott Payne and released his debut album Bright Light Ballads in 2009.

== Early career ==
Payne was born in Liverpool and spent some of his teenage years in New York City before returning home with his family and forming The Magic Clock in 1992 before fronting later bands the Windmills (with future Cast drummer Keith O'Neill), Telefone and Blueseed. Blueseed released their debut single "The Only Ones" in 1997 and an EP Special Care and Spare Change in 1998 on Ultimate Records (an extended version of the EP with the debut single material as bonus tracks was released in Europe as a mini album). In 1999, Payne then joined Edgar Jones's band the Big Kids on lead guitar with his brother Sean Payne on drums and Russell Pritchard on bass, who both went on to play in the Zutons.

== The Stands ==
In 2002, Payne formed the Stands with various local musicians before settling on the lineup of Luke Thomson, Steve Pilgrim and Dean Ravera. The band signed to The Echo Label in 2003. The band released two albums, All Years Leaving in 2004 and Horse Fabulous in 2005 and had a succession of 5 top 40 UK singles. Following the recording of Horse Fabulous, first Pilgrim and later Thomson were replaced by new members. Payne announced the end of the Stands in November 2005.

== Solo career ==
Following the Stands, Payne teamed up with producer Ethan Johns to record his debut solo album Bright Light Ballads. Bright Light Ballads was recorded and mixed in seven days using a vintage 8 track tape machine. Other musicians on the record included singer Candie Payne (Payne's sister) and former Stands bassist Dean Ravera, among others. The album was released digitally through Payne's own label, Move City Records on 14 April 2009, and entered the iTunes Singer Songwriter Album Chart at No. 1 and the iTunes Albums Chart at No. 13. The album was then given a physical CD release in the UK on 5 May 2009.

On 21 September 2009, Move City Records released the digital LP Live at the Luminaire, a live album of Payne's sold-out solo performance at The Luminaire club, London, on 28 May 2009. Live at the Luminaire featured material from Payne's debut solo album as well as songs from the Stands' album All Years Leaving. The album entered the iTunes UK Singer Songwriter Chart at No. 10.

Five songs written by Payne were recorded by Ren Harvieu for her debut album Through the Night which was released in May 2012 and which entered the UK Albums Chart at number 5. Payne also co-wrote the single "In the Open" by Benjamin Francis Leftwich, released November 2012.

In 2013, Payne played a handful of low key solo acoustic shows premiering new material.

In 2014, Payne began co-managing Neon Waltz, a band from Caithness with former Oasis manager Marcus Russell and produced several tracks on their debut album Strange Hymns.

In September 2016, Payne toured the UK for the first time in several years before releasing a vinyl edition of his solo LP Bright Light Ballads via Pledge Music. In November 2016, Payne released a free digital download of new home recordings titled High Times, Home Recordings. In March 2017, Payne announced both the release of a 3 disc vinyl collection of recordings by the Stands to be titled The Stands Recordings 2003-2005, and a UK tour to take place in October.

In October 2017, Payne released his second solo album, Mountain with singles "The Brightest Star" and "Hold Steady the Wire".

== Solo discography ==
=== Albums ===
- Bright Light Ballads (2009)
- Live at the Luminaire (2009)
- High Times, Home Recordings (2016)
- Mountain (2017)
- Mountain (Acoustic) (2018)
- In Dreams (EP) (2020)

=== Singles ===
- "Come Down Easy" (2009)
- "I Just Want to Spend Some Time with You" (2009)
- "The Brightest Star" (2017)
- "Some Believer, Sweet Dreamer" (2017)
- "Hold Steady the Wire" (2017)
- "Into Daylight" (2020)
- "In Dreams" (2020)
- "Faster Than Light" (2020)
- "It Feels Like Summer" (2020)
