= Guiding Star (song) =

1997 single by Cast

Single by Cast

from the album Mother Nature Calls
- B-side: "Out of the Blue"; "Mirror Me" (live); "Keep It Alive"; "Redemption Song" (live)
- Released: 16 June 1997
- Length: 4:00
- Label: Polydor
- Songwriter: John Power
- Producer: John Leckie

Cast singles chronology
"Free Me" (1997)	"Guiding Star" (1997)	"Live the Dream" (1997)

"Guiding Star" is the seventh single by Liverpool Britpop band Cast, fronted by ex La's bassist John Power. Released on 16 June 1997 as the second single from Cast's second studio album, Mother Nature Calls (1997), the song reached number nine on the UK Singles Chart.

== Track listings ==
UK CD1

1. "Guiding Star"
2. "Out of the Blue"
3. "Free Me" (live)
4. "Mirror Me" (live)

UK CD2

1. "Guiding Star"
2. "Keep It Alive"
3. "Redemption Song" (live)
4. "Guiding Star" (acoustic)

UK 7-inch single and European CD single

1. "Guiding Star"
2. "Out of the Blue"

UK cassette single

1. "Guiding Star"
2. "Out of the Blue"
3. "Keep It Alive"

== Credits and personnel ==
Credits are taken from the Mother Nature Calls liner notes.

Studio

- Mixed at Olympic Studios (London, England)

Cast

- John Power – writing, vocals, guitar
- Liam "Skin" Tyson – guitar
- Peter Wilkinson – bass
- Keith O'Neill – drums

Other personnel

- John Leckie – production
- Mark "Spike" Stent – mixing

== Charts ==
Chart (1997)	Peak position
Europe (Eurochart Hot 100)	58
Israel (IBA)	27
Scottish Singles Sales (Official Charts)	4
UK Singles (Official Charts)	9
