= Magic Hour (song) =

Single by Cast

from the album Magic Hour
- B-side: "Gypsy Song"; "I Never Wanna Lose You"; "What You Gonna Do?"
- Released: 26 July 1999
- Label: Polydor (561227)
- Songwriter: John Power
- Producer: Gil Norton

Cast singles chronology
| "Beat Mama" (1999) | "Magic Hour" (1999) | "Desert Drought" (2001) |

"Magic Hour" is the eleventh single by the Liverpool britpop band Cast, fronted by ex La's bassist John Power. It was released in 1999. The song was the titletrack as well as the second and final single released from the namesake album. It peaked at number 28 on the UK singles chart spending only one week in the top 40.

== Formats and track listings ==
CD single (1)

1. "Magic Hour"
2. "Gypsy Song"
3. "I Never Wanna Lose You"

CD single (2)

1. "Magic Hour"
2. "Beat Mama" (Fire Island Classic Boy's Own mix)
3. "What You Gonna Do?"

Tape single

1. "Magic Hour"
2. "Allbright"

== Personnel ==
Cast

- John Power – vocals, guitar
- Peter Wilkinson – backing vocals, bass
- Liam "Skin" Tyson – guitar
- Keith O'Neill – drums

Production

- Gil Norton – producer, mixing
- Danton Supple – engineer, mixing

Additional musicians

- David Arnold – strings

== Chart performance ==
| Chart (1999) | Peak position |
|---|---|
| UK Singles (Official Charts) | 28 |
