= Magic Hour =

Magic Hour or The Magic Hour may refer to:

== Film and television ==
- The Magic Hour (2008 film), a Japanese film directed by Kōki Mitani
- Magic Hour (2011 film), a Greek film directed by Costas Kapakas
- Magic Hour (2025 film), an American drama film
- The Magic Hour (talk show), an American talk show hosted by Magic Johnson

=== Episodes ===
- "The Magic Hour" (Brandy & Mr. Whiskers)
- "Magic Hour" (Charmed)
- "Magic Hour" (Haven)
- "Magic Hour" (Home Before Dark)

== Music ==
- Magic Hour (band), an American psychedelic rock band

=== Albums ===
- Magic Hour (Cast album) or the title song (see below), 1999
- Magic Hour (Scissor Sisters album), 2012
- Magic Hour (Luscious Jackson album), 2013
- Magic Hour (Surf Curse album), 2022
- The Magic Hour (album) or the title song, by Wynton Marsalis, 2004
- The Magic Hour, an album by Steve Allee, 1995
- Magic Hour (EP), by Kep1er, 2023

=== Songs ===
- "Magic Hour" (song), by Cast, 1999
- "Magic Hour", a song by Jhené Aiko from Chilombo, 2020
- "The Magic Hour", a song by Kimbra from The Golden Echo, 2014

== Other ==
- Golden hour (photography), time of day with particular sunlight conditions
