= Bright Light Ballads =

Studio album by Howard Eliott Payne
- Released: 14 April 2009
- Genre: Folk, blues, acoustic
- Length: 34:44
- Label: Move City
- Producer: Ethan Johns

Howard Eliott Payne chronology
Bright Light Ballads (2009)	Live at the Luminaire (2009)

Bright Light Ballads is the debut solo album by English singer-songwriter Howard Eliott Payne, formerly of the Liverpool band The Stands.

The album was produced by Ethan Johns (Kings Of Leon, Ryan Adams etc.) and released digitally on 14 April 2009, reaching No. 14 in the ITunes album chart. A limited physical CD release was made available on 4 May 2009.

== Track listing ==
All songs written by Howard Eliott Payne.

1. "Dangling Threads" – 2:44
2. "Come Down Easy" – 4:09
3. "Seven Years" – 4:14
4. "Until Morning" – 3:51
5. "When Summer Has Passed" – 3:09
6. "I Just Want to Spend Some Time with You" – 3:27
7. "You Can't Hurt Me Anymore" – 3:11
8. "Walk by My Side" – 3:27
9. "Underneath the Sun Rising" – 3:18
10. "Lay Down Your Tune for Me" – 3:14

== Personnel ==
- Howard Eliott Payne – vocals, guitar

Production

- Ethan Johns – producer
- Bob Ludwig – mastering

Additional musicians

- Candie Payne – backing vocals
- Dean Ravera – bass guitar, double bass, backing vocals
- Scott Marmion – pedal steel guitar
- Nicole Terry – violin

== Release history ==
Region	Date	Label	Format	Catalog
United Kingdom	14 April 2009	Move City	Digital	MCR001
United Kingdom	4 May 2009	Move City	CD	MCR001
