= Candie Payne =

English singer and songwriter (born 1981)

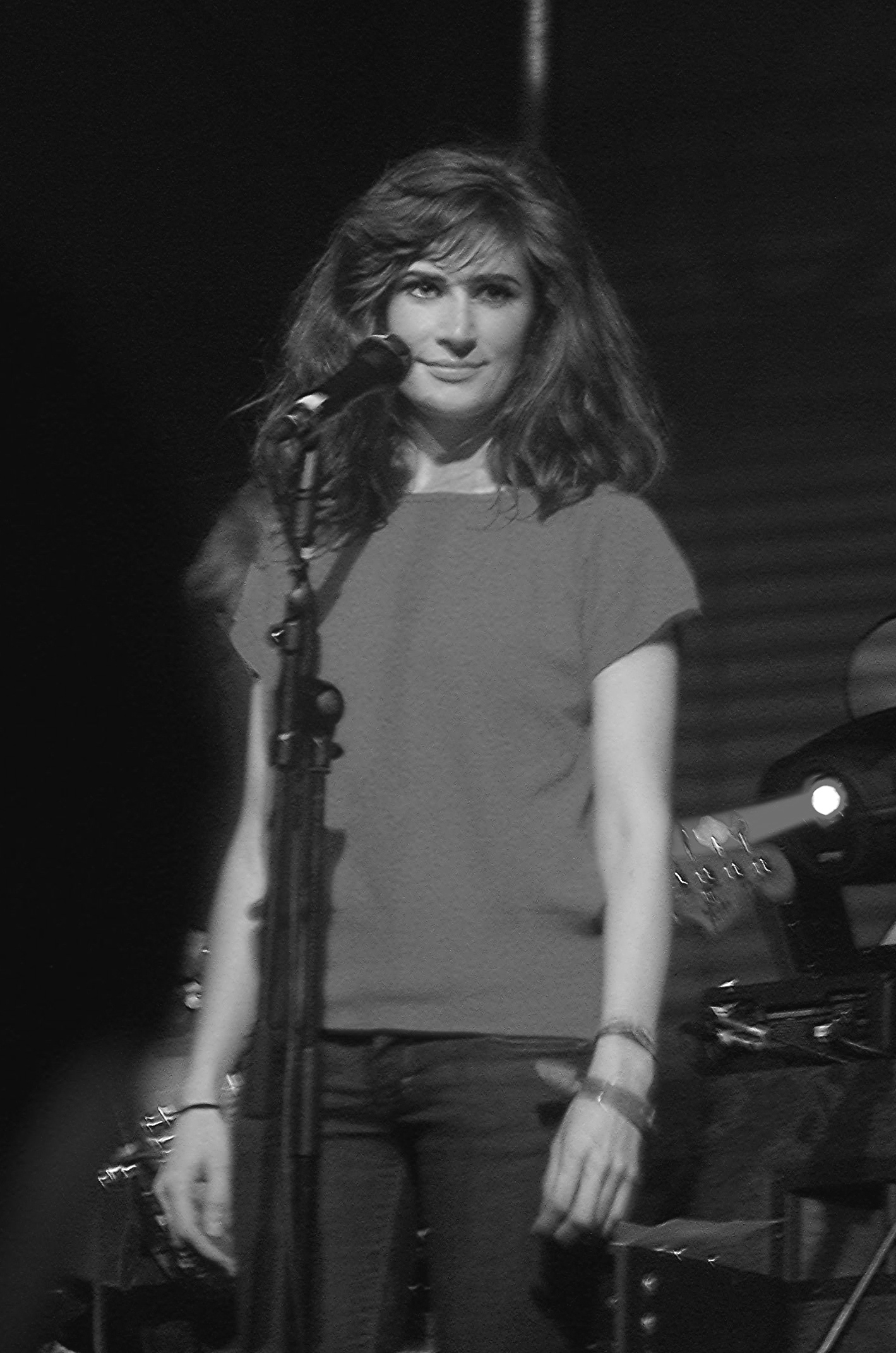
- Payne performing at Glastonbury Festival in 2007

Background information
- Born: Candice Payne; 19 December 1981 (age 44); Liverpool, England
- Genres: Alternative rock, indie rock, pop
- Occupations: Singer, songwriter
- Years active: 2003–present
- Label: Deltasonic

Candice "Candie" Payne (born 19 December 1981) is an English singer and songwriter. She released her debut album, I Wish I Could Have Loved You More, on Deltasonic in May 2007. She is the sister of singer/songwriter Howie Payne, former frontman of band the Stands, and Sean Payne, former drummer of the Zutons.

== Early life ==
Payne was born in Liverpool in 1981. Aged four, her family relocated to New York City before moving back when Payne was 10. Initially shunning music, Payne pursued a career in visual art, attending art college and working in a vintage clothing shop in Liverpool city centre. However, Payne became disenchanted with her studies and, after performing with a friend's band, exchanged her interest for music.

== Career ==
Candie Payne originally began performing with Liverpool band Tramp Attack and Edgar Jones & the Joneses in the early 2000s. She was then introduced to Simon Dine of Noonday Underground with whom she began composing songs.

In 2006, Payne release two singles, "By Tomorrow" and "Take Me". These preceded her debut album, I Wish I Could Have Loved You More, which was released in May 2007. The single version of "One More Chance", produced by Mark Ronson, followed in September of that year.

In November 2007, The Times Magazine looked ahead to Liverpool's year as the European City of Culture in 2008 by featuring Payne on its cover alongside Liverpudlian singer Cilla Black and Abi Harding of the Zutons, who was engaged to Payne's brother Sean – "How Liverpool got its mojo back".

In December 2007, she sang a version of "Oh My God" with Mark Ronson and Ricky Wilson on Friday Night with Jonathan Ross. Soon after this appearance, Ronson asked Payne to appear on his 'Version' tour in 2008. The tour covered the UK, Europe and the US and major festivals including the Glastonbury festival, Global Gathering and the Montreux Jazz Festival. Payne says it "was an incredible opportunity and I gained so much experience from it.

== Style ==
Payne sings 60s-inspired pop. Soul singers Minnie Riperton and Roberta Flack are among her influences. Her pet hate is 'over-singing'."

== Discography ==
=== Albums ===
- I Wish I Could Have Loved You More (2007) No. 56 (UK)

=== Singles ===
Year	Title	Peak chart positions	Album
Year	Title	UK	Album
2006	"All I Need to Hear"	–	I Wish I Could Have Loved You More
2006	"Take Me"	–	I Wish I Could Have Loved You More
2006	"By Tomorrow"	–	I Wish I Could Have Loved You More
2007	"I Wish I Could Have Loved You More"	84	I Wish I Could Have Loved You More
2007	"One More Chance" (Mark Ronson version)	122	I Wish I Could Have Loved You More

=== Guest appearances ===
- Edgar Jones – Soothing Music for Stray Cats (2005)
- Kevin Ayers – The Unfairground (2007)
- Kings Have Long Arms featuring Candie Payne – "Big Umbrella" (2008)
- Howard Eliott Payne – Bright Light Ballads (2009)
- David Byrne & Fatboy Slim – Here Lies Love (2010)
- The Chanteuse and The Crippled Claw – "Are You One?" (2010)
- The Wild Swans – The Coldest Winter for a Hundred Years (2011)
- The Wild Swans – Tracks in Snow EP (2011)
