= Martyn Campbell =

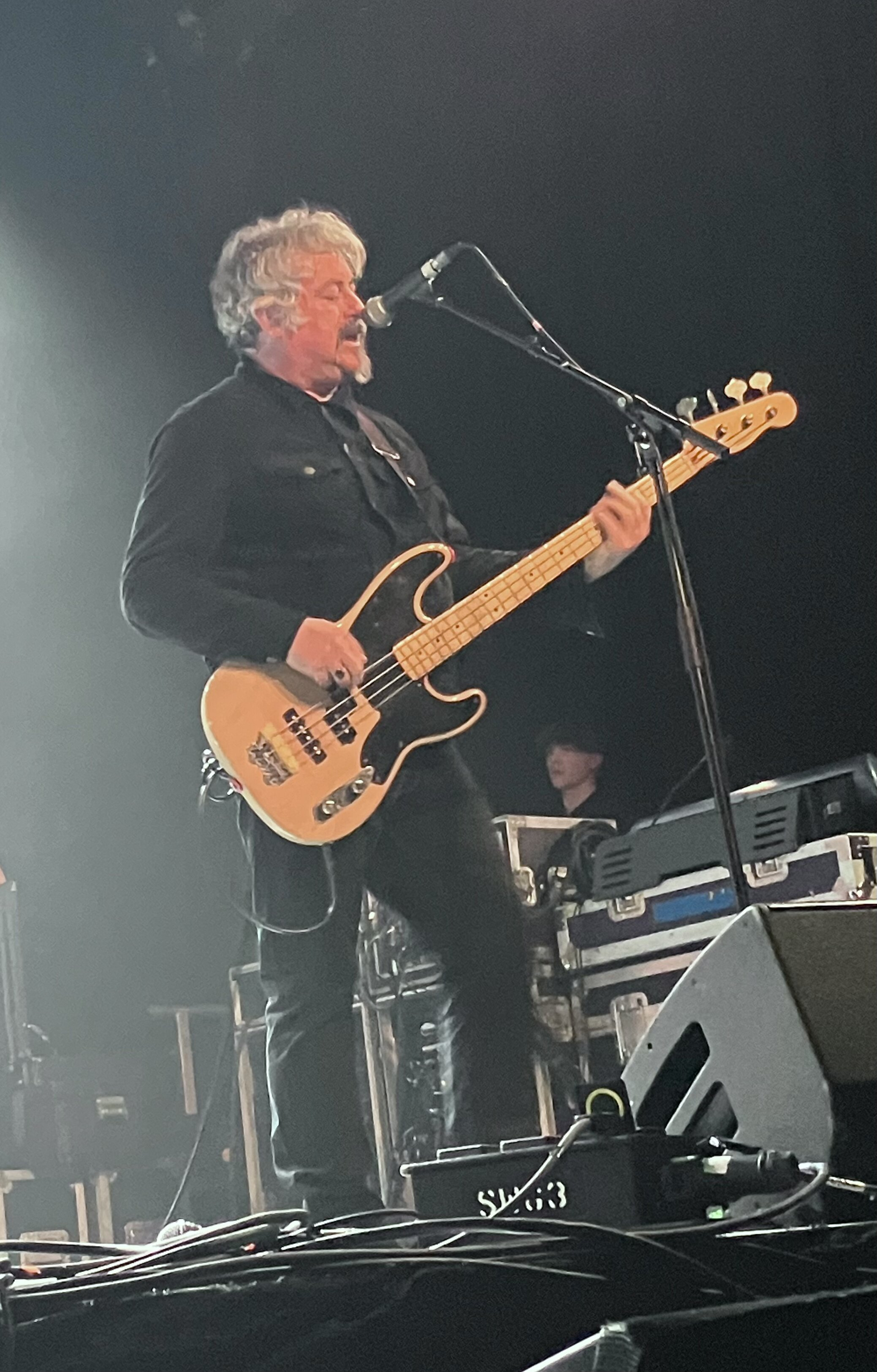
- Campbell touring with Cast during their 2024 Love Is the Call tour

Background information
- Born: Martyn Craig Campbell; 1970 (age 55–56); Liverpool, England
- Genres: Alternative rock, indie rock
- Occupations: Bass guitarist, record producer
- Instrument: Bass guitar
- Years active: 1988–present

Martyn Craig Campbell (born 1970 in Liverpool) is an English bass guitarist.

He is best known for his work with Rain, the Lightning Seeds, Richard Ashcroft, Wah! and Terry Hall. Campbell has also worked with Pete Wylie, and toured with Shack.

== Associated acts ==
- Rain (1988–1992)
- The Lightning Seeds (1994–2000, 2009–present)
- Shack (2007–present)
- Cast (2017, 2024; touring)

== Session discography ==
- Rain – A Taste of Rain (1991)
- The Lightning Seeds – Dizzy Heights (1996)
- Terry Hall – Laugh (1997)
- The Lightning Seeds – Tilt (1999)
- Mike Badger – Double Zero (2000)
- Arthur Lee & Shack – Live in Liverpool (2000)
- Steve Roberts – It Just Is (2001)
- Richard Ashcroft – Human Conditions (2002)
- John Power – Happening for Love (2003)
- Mike Badger – Lo Fi Acoustic Excursions (2004)
- Richard Ashcroft – Keys to the World (2006)
- Mike Badger – Rogue State (2011)
