= I'm So Lonely =

I'm So Lonely may refer to:

- "I'm So Lonely" (The Beach Boys song)
- "I'm So Lonely" (Cast song)
