= The Fields of Anfield Road =

Liverpool F.C. song

"The Fields of Anfield Road" is a football song sung by supporters of Liverpool Football Club. It proceeds to the tune of "The Fields of Athenry"; composed by singer-songwriter Pete St. John in 1979, before being adapted by Liverpool supporter Edward 'Eddy' Williams from Poulton, Wallasey, who sent in his original version to LFC. It is sung in its original form by supporters of the Republic of Ireland and Celtic, as well as GAA teams and the Ireland, Munster Connacht Rugby and London Irish rugby union teams.

The song was adapted in 2009 to include a third verse commemorating the twentieth anniversary of the Hillsborough Disaster. John Power, of Cast and the La's, co-wrote the final verse and vocal contributions were made by Phil Thompson and Bruce Grobbelaar, amongst others. The song, credited to the Liverpool Collective featuring the Kop Choir, was a new entry at number 16 on the UK Singles Chart on 12 April 2009 and reached number 14 a week later. In Scotland, the song reached number one on 26 April, and it also topped the UK Indie Chart.

== Charts ==
Chart (2009)	Peak position
Scottish Singles Sales (Official Charts)	1
UK Singles (Official Charts)	14
UK Indie (Official Charts)	1
