= Twist the Knife =

"Twist the Knife" may refer to:

- "Twist the Knife", a 2012 song by Ren Harvieu
- "Twist the Knife", a 2025 song by Rebecca Black
