= Steve Pilgrim (musician) =

English drummer and singer-songwriter

- Born: Steven Michael Pilgrim; 1979 (age 46–47); Liverpool, England
- Genres: Alternative rock, indie rock, blues, folk, acoustic
- Occupations: Drummer, singer-songwriter, producer, founder BeOnePercent charity
- Instruments: Drums, acoustic guitar
- Years active: 2003–present
- Website: www.stevepilgrim.co.uk

Steven Michael Pilgrim (born 1979) is an English drummer and singer-songwriter. He was originally the drummer for The Stands (2003–2004) playing on both the band's albums however he left before the band eventually split up. Following his departure, Pilgrim has established a career as a singer-songwriter, releasing four solo albums to date: Lover, Love Her (2007), Sunshine (2009), Pixels and Paper (2011) and Morning Skies (2017). He has also drummed for several artists including John Power and Paul Weller.

== Biography ==
Pilgrim joined The Stands as drummer in 2003 and played with the band for three years. The band were part of Liverpool's Bandwagon scene in the early 2000s and Noel Gallagher was an early fan of The Stands. Whilst in the band Pilgrim played on both their studio albums All Years Leaving (2004) and Horse Fabulous (2005) however he left before their 2005 U.S. tour. After leaving The Stands, Pilgrim played with The Cuckolds from 2005 to 2006 and began work as a session musician playing with artists such as Akeboshi and Sophie Solomon (who he also toured with). In 2007, he joined Northern Irish band The Fools and played on their only release, the Enjoy It EP (2007).

Pilgrim joined John Power's band for the Willow She Weeps tour and also played on Power's third studio album Stormbreaker (2008). Pilgrim then went on to drum for Paul Weller joining his band for the 22 Dreams tour, after making his debut at a charity gig at the Roundhouse, London for a Crisis Consequences charity gig in March 2008. Pilgrim played on the album Wake Up the Nation (2010) and has been credited for a variety of roles on most of Weller's studio albums since.

In 2011 Pilgrim also recorded and toured with the reformed Cast on their new album Troubled Times, in place of original drummer Keith O'Neill, which was released in March 2012.

With Weller, Pilgrim has extensively toured North America, Europe, Asia, the UK and Ireland, also playing at the Sydney Opera House for a sold-out three-night run in early 2018. Weller has also allowed Pilgrim to play his own songs on several occasions at his shows, including Sunshine and Love on Your Side.

In 2016, Weller's band took the advantage of a hiatus in touring to perform two tours of their own and release an album as The Songbook Collective, with the addition of Steve Cradock's wife Sally on backing vocals, keys and percussion. Most members wrote several original songs for the record, recorded by the group. They performed this original material alongside their other separate work at live shows. Pilgrim contributed three songs to the album: Weight of the World, Instant Gratification Blues and Laura's Song. Live, he would play several of his own songs including Firecracker and Explode the Sun with an acoustic guitar, backed by the rest of the band. He also sung on Ocean Colour Scene song The Circle, playing drums on the set-ending cover of The Jam's Art School. The band also performed at The Jam celebration show at Liverpool's Echo Arena in October 2016 alongside From the Jam and others, to end Nicky Weller's exhibition in the city, About the Young Idea.

In 2017, Pilgrim released his fourth studio album Morning Skies. Recorded at Weller's Black Barn studios, the album featured several appearances from Weller, plus Danny Thompson on double bass and Rachael Jean Harris on backing vocals. He played several shows to promote the album, including two alongside Thompson at the Half Moon in Putney and Edge Hill University, Ormskirk. Also around this time, Pilgrim's third album Pixels and Paper was re-released on white vinyl to celebrate its fifth anniversary.

In January 2018, prior to embarking on Paul Weller's Spring UK arena tour, Pilgrim released a demo entitled Beautiful Blue, for free download from his Bandcamp page. A fifth studio album, also featuring Thompson, has been discussed, although there has been no release date announced yet.

In his tenth year in Weller's band, Pilgrim assumed a more forward role. Since 2017, Pilgrim had sat at the front during the acoustic encores, singing a verse of Wild Wood when it was played (Pilgrim came to national attention doing that on Jools Holland's Royal Albert Hall show to celebrate the 25th anniversary of his show Later... in 2017), also contributing acoustic guitar to Come On/Let's Go and Hopper. For a pair of shows with an orchestra at London's Royal Festival Hall in October 2018 and a BBC Radio 2 In Concert broadcast at the start of November, Pilgrim sat at the front of the stage playing acoustic guitar, with The Moons' Ben Gordelier on drums. Pilgrim also sung Conor O'Brien's verse in The Soul Searchers, providing backing vocals elsewhere.

== Associated acts ==
- The Stands (2003–2004)
- The Cuckolds (2005–2006)
- Sophie Solomon (2005–2006)
- John Power (2006–2008, 2017)
- The Fools (2007)
- Paul Weller (2008–present)
- The Rainband (2013)
- Cast (2011–2014)
- The Songbook Collective (2016)

== Solo discography ==
- Lover, Love Her (2007)
- Sunshine (2009)
- Pixels and Paper (2011)
- Morning Skies (2017)
- The Magic String Session (with Danny Thompson)(2019)

== With Paul Weller ==
- Just a Dream: 22 Dreams Live [DVD] (2009)
- Wake Up the Nation (2010)
- Find the Torch, Burn the Plans (Live at the Royal Albert Hall) [DVD] (2010)
- Sonik Kicks (2012)
- Jawbone (soundtrack) (2017)
- True Meanings (2018)
- True Meanings live from The Royal Festival Hall DVD (due early 2019)

Plus various single, session and bootleg appearances.

== Band discography ==
- The Stands – All Years Leaving (2004)
- The Stands – Horse Fabulous (2005)
- The Fools – Enjoy It (2007)
- The Songbook Collective – The Songbook Collective (2016)

== Selected Session discography ==
- Akeboshi – Akeboshi (2005)
- Sophie Solomon – Poison Sweet Madera (2006)
- Akeboshi – Meet Along the Way (2007)
- John Power – Stormbreaker (2008)
- Rachael Wright – Just Like He Said (2008)
- Akeboshi – Roundabout (2008)
- Alexander Wolfe – Morning Brings a Flood (2009)
- Cast – Troubled Times (2011)

== Personal life ==
He has been married to Laura since 2006 and they have two children.

Pilgrim is co-founder of the charity Be One Percent, also supported by Weller, which asks participants to give up one per cent of their wages for good causes. Pilgrim and Weller have played fundraising gigs in support of the charity, like in 2014 at Liverpool's East Village Arts Club.

Pilgrim was part of Paul Weller's band for the Momentum-run Concert for Corbyn in Brighton in 2017.
