= Beetroot (album) =

Studio album by Cast
- Released: 30 July 2001
- Recorded: Astoria, London; Real World, Box, Wiltshire
- Genre: Rock
- Length: 44:01
- Label: Polydor
- Producers: Tristin Norwell, John Power

Cast chronology
Magic Hour (1999)	Beetroot (2001)	The Collection (2004)

Singles from Beetroot
- 1. "Desert Drought" Released: 16 July 2001

Beetroot is the fourth album by the English band Cast, released on 30 July 2001. From the album, a single was released, "Desert Drought", which reached #45 in the UK Singles Chart. Two further intended singles, "Kingdoms And Crowns" and "Giving It All Away" were cancelled due to the album and first single's poor sales.

== Background ==
In the run up to the album's release, the band ran a competition via their then-official website, appealing to fans to submit their own ideas for possible album titles, as the band proposed that they would choose a title from all of the entries received. However, despite the many suggestions, John ultimately decided to stick with his own working title for the project, 'Beetroot'.

Although the band chose not to use any of the names suggested, they did make a Top 10 list of alternate album titles:

- '4Cast'
- 'All of Us Are'
- 'Out From Within'
- 'Pyramid'
- 'Recreativity'
- 'Reflector'
- 'Sense & Sensemilia'
- 'So It Goes'
- 'Spirit Level'
- 'What Remains To Be Discovered?'

== Reception ==
Professional ratings
Review scores
Source	Rating
AllMusic	3.5/5 stars
Gigslutz	4/5
God Is in the TV	1.5/5
The Guardian	3/5 stars
Is this music?	3/5 stars
NME	3/5 stars
Record Collector	2/5 stars

In a retrospective review, Jamie Atkins of Record Collector said the album and its predecessor showcase a band attempting to "break new ground," while Beetroot "in particular containing their most adventurous work [...] It all just lacks wit, imagination and conviction".

== Track listing ==
All songs written by John Power.

1. "Desert Drought" – 2:47
2. "Heal Me" – 1:36
3. "Curtains" – 3:25
4. "Kingdoms and Crowns" – 3:41
5. "Giving It All Away" – 4:17
6. "Lose Myself" – 4:09
7. "I Never Can Say" – 4:31
8. "High Wire" – 3:56
9. "Meditations" – 3:49
10. "JetSteam" – 4:32
11. "U-Turn" – 3:12
12. "Universal Grinding Wheel" – 3:59

== Personnel ==
Cast

- John Power – vocals, guitar, backing vocals, producer, mixing, arrangements
- Peter Wilkinson – bass, backing vocals
- Liam "Skin" Tyson – guitar, backing vocals
- Keith O'Neill – drums, percussion, backing vocals

Production

- Tristin Norwell – producer, engineer, mixing, arrangements
- Simon B. Sheridan – engineer
- Claire Lewis – assistant engineer
- Damon Iddins – assistant engineer
- Adrian Hall – assistant engineer
- The Weathermen – Pro Tools operator
- Lawrence Johnson – additional vocal arrangements
- Kevin Metcalfe – mastering

Additional musicians

- Lurine Cato – backing vocals
- Michelle John – backing vocals
- Rachel McFarlane – backing vocals
- David Farmer – brass
- David Vines – brass
- David Williamson – brass
- James Watson – brass
- Richard Brown – brass
- Tom Edwards – brass
- Tom Watson – brass
- William Watson – brass
- Paul Ellison – piano, flute

Additional personnel

- Matthew Sankey – design
- Barry Dawson – photography
- Martyn Goodacre – photography
- Brian Cannon – photography

== Chart performance ==
Chart (2001)	Peak position
UK Albums Chart	78
