= Jay Lewis (musician) =

Musician from Liverpool

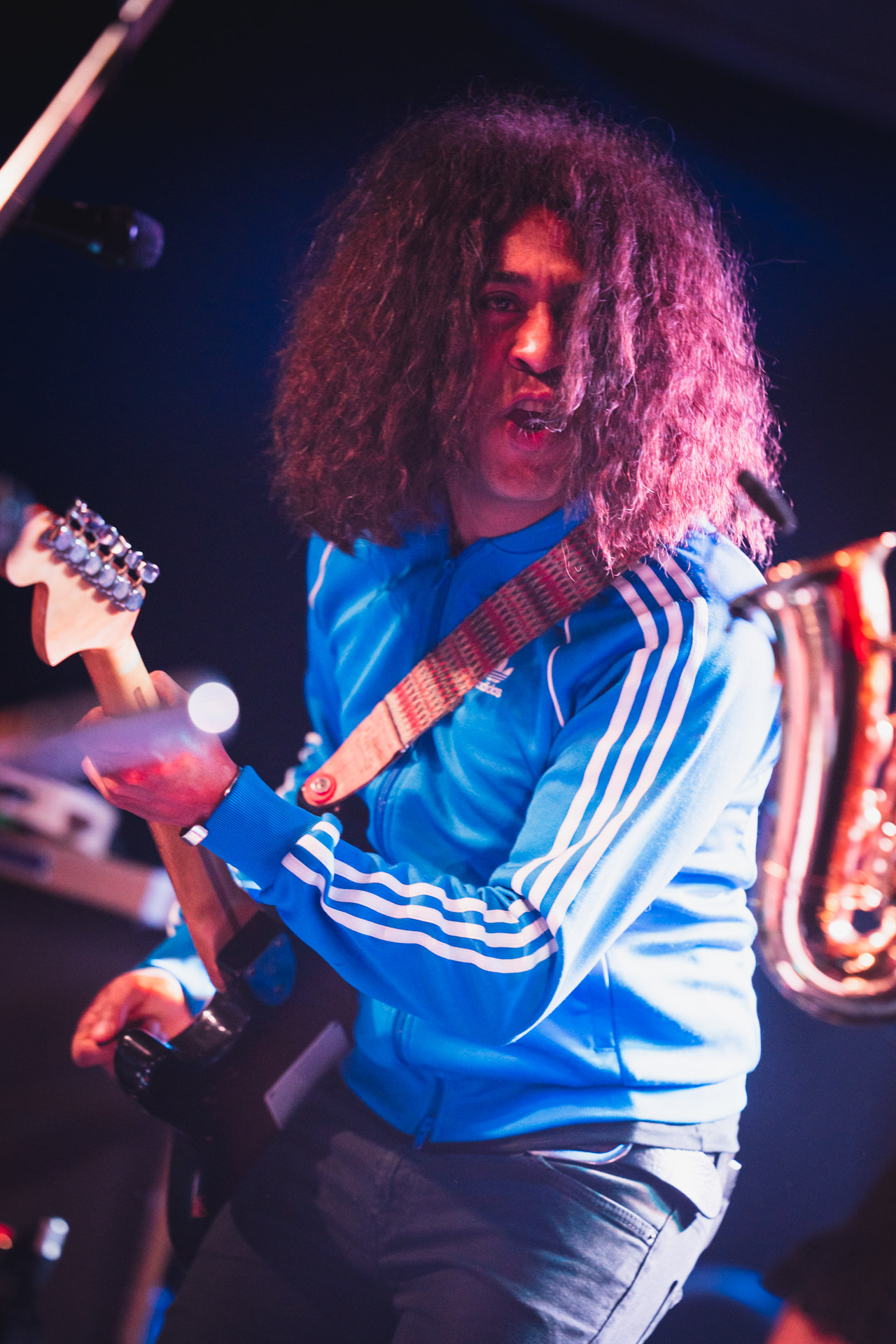
Lewis performing with The Zutons in 2024

James Lewis is an English singer, songwriter and multi-instrumentalist from Huyton, Liverpool. He is best known as the frontman of Liverpool band Cracatilla and current guitarist with the Zutons also bassist for the band Cast, and as lead guitarist during comeback shows for seminal Liverpool group The La's.

== Cracatilla ==
Lewis first came to prominence as the lead singer and guitarist in Cracatilla, a trio he had formed with school friend Dave Penswick on bass and neighbor Louis Fitzpatrick on drums. Named after Lewis' mishearing of the volcano Krakatoa, the band released their debut single "What Do I Know" in August 2002. This was followed by the double A-side "You've Got It All"/"Everyman" on 2 June 2003.

== The La's ==
After announcing they were reuniting for performances at Summer Sonic Festival in Japan, on 24 March 2005, The La's confirmed their first U.K. shows in over a decade with a new line-up consisting of original members Lee Mavers and John Power, with Lewis on lead guitar and Nick Miniski on drums. While the sets were mostly similar to the band's shows in the late Eighties until 1991 by drawing heavily from their sole full-length album, these shows were also notable for including three unreleased songs, "I Am the Key", "Gimme the Blues" and "Sorry". Besides headlining shows in the U.K., Ireland and Japan, the band also played at festivals including Glastonbury and Oxegen. The La's final shows took place at V Festival in Chelmsford and Stafford on 20 and 21 August 2005.

== John Power ==
Following their stint together in The La's, Lewis would become a frequent collaborative partner of John Power in the studio and for live shows, both as part of a backing band and as an acoustic duo. He played slide guitar and bass on Power's third solo album, 2008's Stormbreaker, and is featured on The Mariner Sessions, one of the four discs in Power's The Complete Studio Recordings: 2002-2015 box set released in 2015.

== Cast ==
After bassist Pete Wilkinson abruptly left a Cast tour in December 2014, Lewis was brought in to finish the remainder of the dates. When it emerged that Wilkinson had left the band altogether, Lewis became the band's new permanent bassist. He is featured on the band's sixth album, 2017's Kicking Up the Dust, contributing bass, backing vocals, organ and Fender Rhodes.

== The Zutons ==
Lewis was recruited to play bass for The Zutons' 2019 reunion tour to mark the 15th anniversary of their debut album Who Killed...... The Zutons? in place of Russell Pritchard who could not participate with the other members of the band's original line-up due to his commitments as part of Noel Gallagher's High Flying Birds.

== Solo work ==
Lewis released his solo debut album Back to the Fountain in 2012 and he is currently working on his second album. Jays second album Waiting for the World released 2022 via www.labelrecords.co.uk

== Influences ==
Lewis is a fan of Jimi Hendrix, The Who, Led Zeppelin, Cream, Pink Floyd, Crosby, Stills & Nash, Howlin' Wolf, Muddy Waters, The Raconteurs, Dr. Dre, Captain Beefheart, The Beatles, The Rolling Stones, Jethro Tull, The Doors, Bob Marley, John Williams and Nick Drake.
