= The Stands =

English alternative rock band

- Origin: Liverpool, England
- Genre: Alternative rock
- Years active: 2002–2005
- Label: Echo
- Past members: Howie Payne; Steve Pilgrim; Luke Thomson; Dean Ravera; Graeme Robinson; Paul Molloy

The Stands were an English alternative rock band, formed in 2002 in Liverpool. The band was composed of singer-songwriter Howie Payne, guitarist Luke Thomson, bassist Dean Ravera and drummer Steve Pilgrim.

They released two albums, before Pilgrim and Thomson left the band following the release of their second album. The band toured the album with drummer Graeme Robinson and guitarist Paul Molloy. They split up in November 2005, shortly after parting ways with their label Echo Records.

== History ==
The Stands were formed by Howie Payne in 2002 following the split of the Edgar Jones fronted The Big Kids, for whom Payne had played lead guitar. Early local shows featured a revolving cast of backing musicians, including brother Sean Payne and Russell Pritchard (both fellow ex-Big Kids members and later of The Zutons) and session player Martyn Campbell. Payne then set about putting together a more permanent lineup and recruited local acoustic singer-songwriter/drummer Steve Pilgrim on drums and Luke Thomson on guitar. The trio, along with Campbell on Bass, recorded a selection of demos at Parr St Studios in Liverpool, which were reportedly financed by Payne roadying for The Zutons on the first UK tour.

In September 2002, the ITV program "This Is Music" filmed a special episode focusing on the emerging new music scene in Liverpool, centered on The Bandwagon night, run by members of local band The Bandits at The Zanzibar venue. Due to the band being newly formed and having performed few shows, they were not set to appear until the other bands petitioned the producers of the show to add The Stands to the program, which they did and the band performed All Years Leaving, with Russell Pritchard filling in on bass. Having watched the band perform, local musician Dean Ravera asked to join the band after the show. He joined the band a week later and the band were shortly after invited to support The Coral on their imminent autumn UK tour. During the tour, Payne received a phone call from Noel Gallagher who had been given a copy of the Parr St demos by Martyn Campbell at the Oasis show at Old Trafford Cricket Ground, where Campbell was playing with support act Richard Ashcroft. Gallagher invited the band to support Oasis at their upcoming show in Liverpool at the Royal Court in December 2002, and were subsequently asked to support Oasis again for two nights at the NIA in Birmingham. In early 2003 and still unsigned without management, the band supported the likes of The Burn, Alfie, Stephen Fretwell, The Zutons and further shows with The Coral. The band were also invited to play Glastonbury, V Festival, T in the park and two further shows with Oasis at the Point Theatre in Dublin.

In Spring 2003, the band signed to Echo Records and began recording their debut album at Noel Gallagher's Wheeler End recording studio. In the middle of recording, the band joined Jet on their Get Born tour in the UK and Europe. The two bands formed a friendship that resulted in Jet inviting the band to join them on their homecoming tour of Australia.

The band released their debut single "When This River Rolls Over You" in August 2003 and follow-up single "I Need You" in October 2003.

The band's debut album, All Years Leaving, was released in February 2004 and entered the UK Albums Chart at number 28. The album produced three Top 40 singles in the UK Singles Chart. Gallagher and Coral guitar Bill Ryder-Jones appear on the album

In 2004, the band supported Gomez and Paul Weller, and along with their first headline tours of the UK and Europe, the band played their first US shows in L.A's Troubador and El Rey clubs. The band again played the Glastonbury, V and T festivals along with The Isle of Wight Festival and the Asagari Jam Festival in Japan. In October 2004 The Stands relocated to Los Angeles, California to record their second album, Horse Fabulous with Beck and Elliott Smith producer Tom Rothrock at Sunset Sound Studios. Shortly after the recording of this album, Steve Pilgrim left the band to pursue a solo career.

The band recruited new drummer Graeme Robinson, and supported Brendan Benson in the US and Oasis again in Europe. During a return break to England during the Oasis support tour, Luke Thomson left the band. Paul Molloy (later of The Zutons) was recruited to play the remaining shows. "Do It Like You Like", the band's fifth single, entered the UK Top 30 in May 2005, and the band embarked on a second tour of the U.S. and toured the UK festival circuit through the summer. Horse Fabulous was released on 25 July 2005 and spent one week in the UK Albums Chart.

In Summer 2005, the Chrysalis Group announced a restructuring of The Echo Label after announcing a loss of over £2.0 million,.. This resulted in a change of direction at the label and dropping many of its roster, including I Am Kloot, Black Rebel Motorcycle Club and The Stands. The band's second album, Horse Fabulous, was released just two weeks prior to this announcement, and it is likely the changes affected the album's promotion. Without a record deal, The Stands embarked on a fourth UK tour in September 2005, climaxing in their final show at the Carling Academy Islington, London. The band broke up in November 2005 shortly after their final gig as part of the Love Music Hate Racism campaign in memory of murdered schoolboy Anthony Walker at University of Liverpool on Thursday 27 October 2005.

== Post split ==
Howie Payne released his debut solo album, Bright Light Ballads, produced by Ethan Johns in April 2009 under his full name Howard Eliott Payne. Five songs written by Payne were recorded by Ren Harviue for her debut album, Through The Night, released in April 2012.

Steve Pilgrim recorded with Cast frontman John Power on his solo albums Willow She Weeps and Stormbreaker and toured as The John Power Band with bassist Jay Lewis. He has released two solo albums, collaborated with Japanese folktronica artist Akeboshi and is currently a member of Paul Weller's live band..

Luke Thomson and Steve Pilgrim played together in Cuckolds from 2005 to 2006. Luke is currently working on a solo project.

Dean Ravera played electric and double bass on Payne's debut solo album. He now plays double bass, keys and drums for folk group The Unthanks and played double bass on their fourth album, Last. He played double bass on the debut album, Kite, by Jonny Kearney & Lucy Farrell, which was released on 10 October 2011, and also on Bill Ryder-Jones' debut EP, A Leave Taking Soundtrack, and album If....

== Members ==
- Howie Payne – guitar, vocals (2002–2005)
- Steve Pilgrim – drums, backing vocals (2002–2004)
- Luke Thompson – guitar, backing vocals (2002–2005)
- Dean Ravera – bass guitar (2002–2005)
- Graeme Robinson – drums (2005)
- Paul Molloy – guitar (2005)

== Discography ==
=== Albums ===
Title	Album details	Peak chart positions
Title	Album details	UK
All Years Leaving	Released: 23 February 2004; Label: Echo (#50); Formats: CD, LP, digital download	28
Horse Fabulous	Released: 25 July 2005; Label: Echo (#64); Formats: CD, LP, digital download	62

=== Singles ===
Title	Year	Peak chart positions	Album
Title	Year	UK	Album
"When This River Rolls Over You"	2003	32	All Years Leaving
"I Need You"	2003	39	All Years Leaving
"Here She Comes Again"	2004	25	All Years Leaving
"Outside Your Door"	2004	49	All Years Leaving
"Do It Like You Like"	2005	28	Horse Fabulous
"When the Night Falls In" (cancelled)	2005	–	Horse Fabulous
