= Mother Nature Calls =

Studio album by Cast
- Released: 14 April 1997
- Genre: Rock
- Length: 60:40
- Label: Polydor (537567)
- Producer: John Leckie

Cast chronology
All Change (1995)	Mother Nature Calls (1997)	Magic Hour (1999)

Singles from Mother Nature Calls
- 1. "Free Me" Released: 24 March 1997; 2. "Guiding Star" Released: 16 June 1997; 3. "Live the Dream" Released: 1 September 1997; 4. "I'm So Lonely" Released: 3 November 1997

Mother Nature Calls is the second album by the English band Cast, released on 14 April 1997 by Polydor. It spawned four singles: "Free Me", "Guiding Star", "Live the Dream" and "I'm So Lonely".

== Critical reception ==
Professional ratings
Review scores
Source	Rating
AllMusic	2.5/5 stars
NME	7/10
Record Collector	1/5 stars

AllMusic's Stephen Thomas Erlewine was critical of Power's melodies lacking in memorability and his lyrics being "naive and [often] embarassingly simplistic" that the rest of the band can't convey it well, concluding that: "When the tunes and attitude are there, such weaknesses are easy to overlook, but since Cast comes up deficient on both counts, Mother Nature Calls is simply a dull listen." Ted Kessler, writing in the NME, called the album a "victory of the ears", comparing it favourably to previous album All Change.

In a retrospective review, Jamie Atkins of Record Collector said the album offered "more of the same" as its predecessor, "but considerably duller", bar the "shimmering Guiding Star, one of their better moments".

== Track listing ==
All tracks are written by John Power.

No.	Title	Length
1.	"Free Me"	4:42
2.	"On the Run"	3:35
3.	"Live the Dream"	3:54
4.	"Soul Tied"	5:28
5.	"She Sun Shines"	4:30
6.	"I'm So Lonely"	4:21
7.	"The Mad Hatter"	3:37
8.	"Mirror Me"	4:04
9.	"Guiding Star"	4:00
10.	"Never Gonna Tell You What to Do (Revolution)"	4:28
11.	"Dance of the Stars"	23:21

Note

- "Dance of the Stars" ends at 6:25. After 13 minutes of silence (6:25–19:25), begins the hidden song "Soul Tied (Piano Loop)".

Ltd Edition with bonus CD (released December 1997)

1. "Flying" (Original Version)
2. "Walkaway" (Live in Manchester 1997)
3. "Finetime" (Live in Manchester 1997)

== Personnel ==
Cast

- John Power – vocals, guitar
- Peter Wilkinson – backing vocals, bass
- Liam "Skin" Tyson – guitar
- Keith O'Neill – drums

Production

- John Leckie – producer
- Mark "Spike" Stent – mixing
- Pete Lewis – mixing

== Charts ==
=== Weekly charts ===
Chart (1997)	Peak position
Scottish Albums (Official Charts)	1
UK Albums (Official Charts)	3

=== Year-end charts ===
Chart (1997)	Position
UK Albums (OCC)	47

== Certifications ==
Region	Certification	Certified units/sales
United Kingdom (BPI)	Platinum	300,000^{^}
^{^} Shipments figures based on certification alone.
