= Happening for Love =

Studio album by John Power
- Released: June 30, 2003
- Recorded: 2002–2003
- Studios: Riverside Studios, Bath, The Doghouse Studios, Henley-on-Thames
- Genre: Alternative rock
- Label: Eagle (EAGCD 249)
- Producer: John Leckie

John Power chronology
Happening for Love (2003)	Willow She Weeps (2006)

Professional ratings
Review scores
Source	Rating
AllMusic	2.5/5 stars

Happening for Love is the debut solo album by former The La's bassist and Cast vocalist John Power.

It was released on June 30, 2003.

== Track listing ==
All songs written by John Power.

1. "Electrify" – 4:07
2. "Paradise" – 4:04
3. "Everyday Folk" – 3:25
4. "Small Farm" – 3:31
5. "TNT" – 4:13
6. "Songbird" – 3:37
7. "Mariner" – 4:58
8. "Happening for Love" – 3:19
9. "Change for Tomorrow" – 4:04
10. "Viva" – 4:29
11. "Island" – 4:09

== Personnel ==
- John Power – guitar, vocals, mixing

Production

- John Leckie – producer, engineer, mixing
- Gus Shaw – mastering

Additional musicians

- Martyn Campbell – bass
- Paul Maguire – drums
- Duncan Ross – guitar
- Danny Roberts – harmonica

Additional personnel

- Hamish Brown – photography
- Stuart Green – design
