= I Wish I Could Have Loved You More =

Studio album by Candie Payne
- Released: 21 May 2007
- Recorded: 2006
- Genre: Soul, pop
- Length: 34:27
- Label: Deltasonic
- Producer: Simon Dine

I Wish I Could Have Loved You More is the début album by British pop musician Candie Payne.

== Background ==
Professional ratings
Review scores
Source	Rating
AllMusic	3.5/5 stars
The Times	4/5 stars

Tracks 4 and 8 feature backing vocals by Payne's brother Sean Payne, his fiancee Abi Harding and Russell Pritchard, all of the Zutons.

== Track listing ==
All songs written by Candie Payne and Simon Dine

1. "I Wish I Could Have Loved You More" – 3:33
2. "Why Should I Settle for You" – 4:01
3. "Take Me" – 2:27
4. "In the Morning" – 3:06
5. "All I Need to Hear" – 2:45
6. "A Different You" – 3:52
7. "By Tomorrow" – 3:31
8. "One More Chance" – 2:46
9. "Hey Goodbye" – 3:16
10. "Seasons Change" – 1:50
11. "Turn Back Now" – 3:10

== Personnel ==
- Candie Payne – vocals

Production

- Simon Dine – producer
- Jessica Corcoran – engineer
- Ion Metsovitis – engineer
- Matthew Edge – vocal engineer
- Serge Krebs – assistant engineer
- Mike Hedges – mixing
- Craig Silvey – mixing
- Richard Wilkinson – mixing
- John Brough – vocal mixing
- John Davis – mastering

Additional musicians

- Abi Harding – backing vocals
- Sean Payne – backing vocals
- Russell Pritchard – backing vocals

== Cover versions ==
Emma Bunton covered "I Wish I Could Have Loved You More" on her 2019 album My Happy Place.
