= Desert (English band) =

- Also known as: Mutator, Rested Dooms
- Origin: Liverpool, England
- Genres: House, electronica
- Years active: 1994–2004
- Labels: Vulture Vinyl, Stress, Glow, Future Groove, 3 Beat
- Past members: Paul Kane; Paul Pringle

Desert were an electronic and house music duo from Liverpool, England. Members of the outfit are the producers Paul Kane and Paul Pringle. In 2001 they hit #1 on the U.S. Billboard Hot Dance Club Play chart with "Lettin' Ya Mind Go". They also reached number 74 in the UK Singles Chart. In 2002 their follow-up, "I See the Light," peaked at #34 in the Hot Dance Club Play listings.

== Discography ==
- "Hourglass" (1994)
- "Moods" (1995) #124
- "Feelings Run So Deep" (1996) #129
- "Seasons" (1997)
- "Loose It (To the Sound)" (1998)
- "Voices" (1998)
- "Kollage" (1999)
- "Bitcrusher" (2000)
- "Lettin' Ya Mind Go" (2001) #74
- "I See the Light" (2002) #99
- "Beyond the Sun" (feat. John Power) (2003) #137

== See also ==
- List of number-one dance hits (United States)
- List of artists who reached number one on the US Dance chart
