= Stormbreaker (album) =

Studio album by John Power
- Released: 28 January 2008
- Recorded: 2007
- Genre: Alternative rock
- Label: Tanuki Tanuki (NUKDD 003)

John Power chronology
Willow She Weeps (2006)	Stormbreaker (2008)

Professional ratings
Review scores
Source	Rating
Clash	(mixed)
Mojo	3/5 stars
Q	3/5 stars

Stormbreaker is the third solo album by former The La's bassist and Cast vocalist John Power.

It was released on 28 January 2008.

== Track listing ==
All songs written by John Power.

1. "Ain't No Woman"
2. "Calling You Back"
3. "American Dream"
4. "Stormbreaker"
5. "Distant Eyes"
6. "Good Life"
7. "Fire in My Heart"
8. "Tombstone"
9. "Cockerel Crow"
10. "Come the Morning"

== Personnel ==
- John Power – vocals, acoustic guitar, bass, electric guitar
- Jay Lewis – bass, harmony vocals, slide guitar, electric guitar
- Steve Pilgrim – drums, harmony vocals
