= Through the Night (album) =

Through The Night

Studio album by Ren Harvieu
- Released: 14 May 2012
- Recorded: 2011–2012
- Genres: Pop rock, soul, indie pop
- Length: 42:20
- Label: Island Records
- Producers: Paul Harrison, Jimmy Hogarth

Ren Harvieu chronology
Open Up Your Arms EP (2012)	Through The Night (2012)	Revel in the Drama (2020)

Singles from Through The Night
- 1. "Through The Night" Released: 2 December 2011; 2. "Open Up Your Arms" Released: 21 March 2012; 3. "Tonight" Released: 16 July 2012; 4. "Do Right By Me" Released: 1 October 2012

Professional ratings
Aggregate scores
Source	Rating
Metacritic	(63/100)
Review scores
Source	Rating
BBC Music	4/5 stars
The Guardian	4/5 stars
Independent on Sunday	2.5/5 stars
Mojo	2/5 stars
New Musical Express	4/5 stars
The Observer	3/5 stars
Q	3/5 stars
The Daily Telegraph	4/5 stars

Through the Night is the debut album from Ren Harvieu released on May 14, 2012 on Island Records. It entered the UK mid-week album chart at number 2.

== Background ==
The release of the album was postponed after the accident which happened on May 31, 2011. Ren Harvieu was with friends in an East London field, watching them performing acrobatic leaps over a hedge when she was knocked to the ground and broke her back. "I heard it snap. I couldn't feel my feet. I wasn't on drugs or even drunk. I thought I was gonna die," the singer recalled. After a 14-hour operation Harvieu spent months recovering at the Stanmore's Royal National Orthopaedic Hospital, not knowing whether she'll be able to walk again.

== Reception ==
Through the Night received generally positive reviews from music critics upon its release. At Metacritic, which assigns a normalized rating out of 100 to reviews from mainstream critics, the album received an average score of 63, based on 7 reviews, which indicates "generally favorable reviews".

== Track listing ==
No.	Title	Writer(s)	Length
1.	"Open Up Your Arms"	Dave McCabe	3:47
2.	"Tonight"	Howie Payne	4:13
3.	"Do Right By Me"	Howie Payne	3:58
4.	"Walking in the Rain"	Howie Payne	3:44
5.	"Through the Night"	Ren Harvieu, Jimmy Hogarth, Ed Harcourt, Christopher O'Neill	3:43
6.	"Forever in Blue"	Howie Payne	3:58
7.	"Twist the Knife"	Ren Harvieu, Jimmy Hogarth, Christopher O'Neill, Paul Harrison	3:56
8.	"Dancing on Her Own"	Ren Harvieu, Jimmy Hogarth, Kevin Cormack	3:17
9.	"Holding On"	Howie Payne	3:07
10.	"Summer Romance"	Logan Baren, Justin Baren, Andrew Langer	4:00
11.	"Love Is a Melody"	Ed Harcourt, Jimmy Hogarth	4:27
Total length:			42:20

iTunes Deluxe Version bonus tracks
No.	Title	Writer(s)	Length
12.	"Through the Night" (BBC Live Introducing Session at Maida Vale)	Ren Harvieu, Jimmy Hogarth, Ed Harcourt, Christopher O'Neill	3:37
13.	"Open Up Your Arms" (BBC Live Introducing Session at Maida Vale)	Dave McCabe	3:37
14.	"Forever in Blue" (BBC Live Introducing Session at Maida Vale)	Howie Payne	3:42
15.	"Do Right By Me" (BBC Live Introducing Session at Maida Vale)	Howie Payne	3:57
16.	"Through the Night" (Music Video)	Ren Harvieu, Jimmy Hogarth, Ed Harcourt, Christopher O'Neill	3:49
Total length:			1:01:02

== Charts ==
Chart (2012)	Peak position
Scottish Albums Chart	8
UK Albums Chart	5
UK Digital Albums	13
UK Physical Albums	5
