= Magic Hour (Cast album) =

Studio album by Cast
- Released: 17 May 1999
- Studios: Ridge Farm; Air
- Genre: Rock - Orchestral pop
- Length: 68:28
- Label: Polydor (547176)
- Producer: Gil Norton

Cast chronology
Mother Nature Calls (1997)	Magic Hour (1999)	Beetroot (2001)

Singles from Magic Hour
- 1. "Beat Mama" Released: 26 April 1999; 2. "Magic Hour" Released: 26 July 1999

Magic Hour is the third album by the English band Cast, released in 1999. "Beat Mama" and the title track were both released as singles, and reached number nine and number 28 on the UK Singles Chart respectively.

== Critical reception ==
Professional ratings
Review scores
Source	Rating
AllMusic	3/5 stars
NME	5/10
Record Collector	2/5 stars

Mike DeGagne of AllMusic praised Power's songwriting as "way above 1997's Mother Nature Calls" and his musicianship being "extremely sharp" throughout the track listing, while also highlighting Peter Wilkinson's performance as "more professional and [more] focused" than with his other bands, concluding that: "Even though none of the songs can match the strength of "Guiding Star" […] Magic Hour still stands up as the group's second best recording." Jamie Atkins of Record Collector said the album and its successor Beetroot showcase a band attempting to "break new ground [...] It all just lacks wit, imagination and conviction".

== Track listing ==
All tracks are written by John Power.

No.	Title	Length
1.	"Beat Mama"	4:10
2.	"Compared to You"	3:38
3.	"She Falls"	3:31
4.	"Dreamer"	3:43
5.	"Magic Hour"	3:08
6.	"Company Man"	3:51
7.	"Alien"	5:26
8.	"Higher"	4:04
9.	"Chasing the Day"	4:20
10.	"The Feeling Remains"	3:54
11.	"Burn the Light"	4:01
12.	"Hideaway"	24:42

Note

- "Hideaway" ends at 6:40. After 13 minutes of silence (6:40–19:40), the hidden song "Solo Strings" begins, which is an instrumental version of "Alien" conducted by David Arnold.

== Personnel ==
Cast

- John Power – vocals, guitar
- Peter Wilkinson – backing vocals, bass
- Liam "Skin" Tyson – guitar
- Keith O'Neill – drums

Production

- Gil Norton – producer, mixing
- Danton Supple – engineer, mixing
- David Arnold – string arrangements
- Nicholas Dodd – conductor
- Bob Ludwig – mastering

== Charts ==
Chart (1999)	Peak position
UK Albums Chart	6
