= Ren Harvieu =

English singer-songwriter (born 1990)

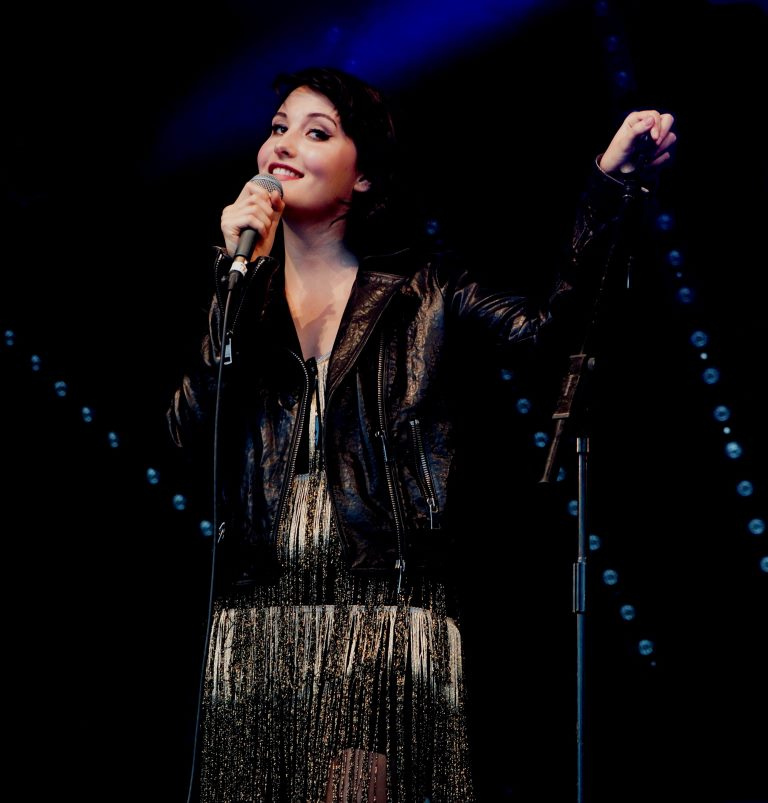
- Harvieu performing at Manchester Pride, 25 August 2013

Background information
- Born: Lauren Maria Harvieu; 3 September 1990 (age 35); Broughton, Salford, England
- Genres: Pop rock, soul, indie pop
- Occupation: Singer-songwriter
- Years active: 2011–present
- Label: Universal Music Group

Lauren Maria "Ren" Harvieu (born 3 September 1990) is an English singer and songwriter from Broughton, Salford, Greater Manchester.

== Early life and education ==
Harvieu was introduced to music by her mother. While in sixth form college, she performed in musical theatre and entered several talent competitions before uploading some of her own recordings to MySpace.

== Career ==
Harvieu was discovered on MySpace by a local music manager after uploading demo tracks. After being introduced to record producer Jimmy Hogarth (Amy Winehouse, Duffy) she began working on demos and was signed to Universal Music aged 18.

Harvieu started recording an album in May 2011, but before it could be released, she broke her back in what she describes as a 'freak accident', "I heard it snap. I couldn't feel my feet," the singer recalled. After a 14-hour operation, Harvieu spent months recovering at the Royal National Orthopaedic Hospital.

On 5 December 2011, the BBC announced that Harvieu had been nominated for their Sound of 2012 poll. After releasing the singles "Through the Night" and "Open Up Your Arms", her first album Through the Night was released on Island Records on 14 May 2012, entering the UK Albums Chart at No 5.

In 2014, Harvieu was featured on "Sweet Malaise", the B-side to "In My Time of Dust", from Ed Harcourt's mini-album Time of Dust. "Love is a Melody", a song written by Ed Harcourt and Jimmy Hogarth for Harvieu's debut album, was also covered on Time of Dust.

Harvieu began working on her second album in 2013. The album, titled Revel in the Drama, was released in April 2020.

== Discography ==
=== Albums ===
Title	Details	Peak chart positions
Title	Details	UK
Through the Night	Released: 14 May 2012; Label: Island; Formats: CD, digital download	5
Revel in the Drama	Released: 3 April 2020; Label: Bella Union; Formats: Vinyl, CD, digital download	—

=== Singles ===
Title	Year	Peak chart positions	Album
Title	Year	UK	Album
"Through the Night"	2011	178	Through the Night
"Open Up Your Arms"	2012	108	Through the Night
"Tonight"	2012	—	Through the Night
"Do Right By Me"	2012	—	Through the Night
"Teenage Mascara"	2019	—	Revel in the Drama
"Yes Please"	2019	—	Revel in the Drama

=== Guest appearances ===
Year	Artist	Track	Album
2013	Mark Owen	"S.A.D."	The Art of Doing Nothing
2024	Linda Thompson	"I Used To Be So Pretty"	Proxy Music

== Awards and nominations ==
Year	Organisation	Award	Result
2012	BBC	Sound of 2012	Nominated
