= Cast (British band) =

English indie rock band

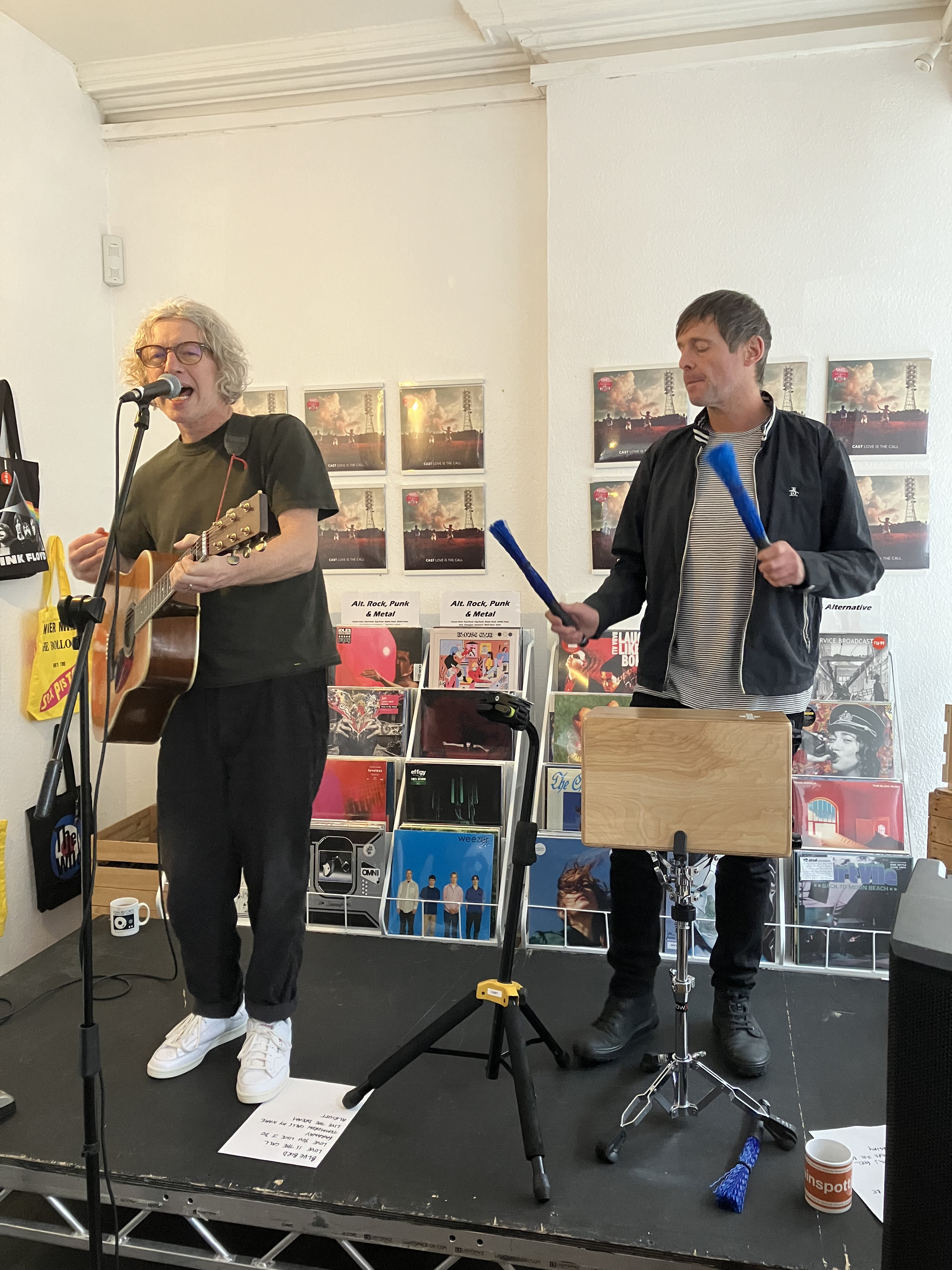
- John Power (left) and Keith O'Neill (right) performing in Edinburgh in 2024

Background information
- Origin: Liverpool, England
- Genres: Britpop; alternative rock; indie rock
- Years active: 1992–2001; 2010–present
- Labels: Scruff of the Neck; Polydor; Cast Recordings
- Members: John Power; Liam "Skin" Tyson; Keith O'Neill
- Past members: Peter Wilkinson; Ged Malley; Barry Sutton; Peter "Cammy" Cammell; Russell Brady; Jay Lewis
- Website: castband.co.uk

Cast are an English indie rock band formed in Liverpool in 1992 by John Power (vocals, guitar) and Peter Wilkinson (bass, backing vocals) after Power left The La's and Wilkinson's former band Shack had split. Following early line-ups with different guitarists and drummers, Liam "Skin" Tyson (guitar) and Keith O'Neill (drums) joined Cast in 1993. On 6 July 2025, Cast announced they had signed to Manchester independent record label Scruff of the Neck.

Emerging from the Britpop movement of the mid-1990s, Cast signed to Polydor Records and their debut album All Change (1995), which included the single "Walkaway", became the highest-selling debut album for the label. Further commercial success continued with the albums Mother Nature Calls (1997) and Magic Hour (1999), however a departure in sound on the band's fourth album Beetroot (2001) was met by a poor critical and commercial reaction and contributed to the band's split two weeks after its release.

The band re-formed in November 2010 and released their fifth album Troubled Times in November 2011. Bassist Peter Wilkinson confirmed his departure from the band in March 2015, after abruptly leaving a previous tour in December 2014. He was replaced on that tour and in the band by Power's frequent collaborator Jay Lewis, who would also feature on their sixth album Kicking Up the Dust, which was released on 21 April 2017. The band would later officially become a trio of Power, Tyson and O'Neill – with Lewis reverting back to touring bassist – during the recording of their seventh album, 2024's Love Is the Call.

Noel Gallagher of Oasis described watching the band live as being like a "religious experience" and they were labelled "The Who of the '90s". It has been suggested that the name Cast was taken from the final word on The La's eponymous album (the song "Looking Glass" ends with the repeated line "The change is cast"): John Power has since confirmed this to be true, despite previously playing the link down to coincidence.

== History ==
=== 1992–1994: Formation and early years ===
John Power was previously the bass player, backing vocalist and only constant member along with Lee Mavers in The La's. He left the band on 13 December 1991 after becoming frustrated with the ever-increasing number of aborted studio sessions, having played essentially the same set of songs since 1986 and emerging as a songwriter in his own right. Power later commented that by that point he was more interested in his own songs "than anyone else's".

Having switched from bass to rhythm guitar whilst residing at Brucklay House – a near derelict squat in Mossley Hill, where the seeds of dance label 3 Beat Records were sown – Power began jamming with friends and with an ever-changing line-up began to form Cast. The first addition to the band was ex-Shack bassist Peter Wilkinson who had seen Power performing acoustically at a free festival in Liverpool, and who Power had seen around town. Embryonic lineups of the band, featuring several guitarists including Ged Malley, ex-La's members Barry Sutton and Cammy and drummer Russell Brady started gigging in mid 1992 and supported the likes of Pele and The Stairs. Power would later state that he was never happy with these lineups. Unhappy with the band and the demos recorded with Who sound engineer Bob Pridden, he split the band up and extricated himself from his Go! Discs contract in Summer 1993, with whom he was still signed to following his departure from The La's, and set about forming a new lineup with Wilkinson.

The first new member to be recruited was Keith O'Neill who had previously played in The Empty Hours, The Windmills and Tommy Scott's pre-Space band The Australians and who Power had seen playing in local band The Windmills, fronted by Howie Payne later of The Stands and then guitarist Liam 'Skin' Tyson, who Wilkinson knew from college and had previously played in Pyramid Dream. When approached to join the band, Tyson initially declined as he had sold all of his musical equipment to teach canoeing at an outdoor centre in Alston in Cumbria. Tyson, who witnessed one of the band's early London shows and commented that "John had these songs, but not the band", joined the band in November 1993 and the new lineup played their first gig in Hull in January 1994. Within months the band secured high-profile support slots with Elvis Costello on two UK tours, including 2 nights at the Royal Albert Hall and Oasis. It was during the tour with Oasis that Polydor head of A&R Paul Adam, surprised that the band had not already been snapped up, approached the band to sign them. The band signed to Polydor on 13 December 1994, three years to the day that Power left The La's.

=== 1995–1998: Record deal and success ===
Cast's core lineup in 1996. From left: Peter Wilkinson, Keith O'Neill, John Power, Liam Tyson

The band released their debut single "Finetime" in July 1995, which went straight in at No. 17. The follow-up single "Alright", a song originally written and performed a handful of times whilst still in the La's under the original title "Fly On" became the band's first top 15 hit in the UK, peaking at No. 13 on the singles chart.

The band's debut album All Change, released October 1995 was produced by John Leckie who had previously worked with the Stone Roses and the Verve and had also previously worked with Power in the La's. The album shot to No. 7 on the UK chart, reaching double platinum and went on to become the fastest selling debut album in the history of the Polydor label, outselling the likes of the Jimi Hendrix Experience, the Who and the Jam. A further two singles were taken from the album in "Sandstorm" (No. 8) and "Walkaway" (No. 9), both top ten hits.

A stand-alone single was released in October 1996 titled "Flying", which reached No. 4 on the UK singles chart, giving the band their highest chart position in the UK to date.

With their second album Mother Nature Calls, released in April 1997, the "rockier material was now sounding looser and cockier in a Stonesy or Faces-ish way and the moodier tracks awash with melancholic atmosphere". The band worked again with John Leckie. The album peaked at No. 3, reaching platinum and stayed in the top 40 for over 6 months. The album spawned three top ten hits in "Free Me" (No. 7), "Guiding Star" (No. 9), "Live the Dream" (No. 7) and one top twenty hit with the fourth single from the album, "I'm So Lonely" (No. 14), a ballad written during a period of bleak loneliness in a Japanese hotel room. Power revealed that the album title was supposed to be tongue-in-cheek, because Mother Nature is always calling because of man's mortality, but also because he was on the toilet at the time he came up with the name. Although The Daily Telegraph proclaimed "Employing the spiritual terms of Power's lyrics, Cast may be the perfect Taoist band. They don't seem to try. Cast just are", the album received largely mixed reviews in the press, Power later blamed this on the fact that it was more of a slow burner than the more instant All Change and claimed that a number of critics later told him that repeated listens had changed their perceptions of the album.

=== 1999–2001: Post-Britpop and split ===
By the time the band set to work on their third album, Magic Hour, released May 1999 the Britpop movement was faltering – a number of Cast's contemporaries, such as Kula Shaker and The Seahorses had disbanded, Suede and Mansun were experiencing a drop in record sales from their previous efforts and label mates Shed Seven and Medal had been dropped by Polydor. Amid the changing musical climate, the band enlisted Gil Norton who had previously produced The Pixies and the band moved towards a heavier riff based sound. Power described the album as "21st century rock'n'roll" and "Walt Disney doing Quadrophenia".

The first single from "Magic Hour" was "Beat Mama", with the band using loops and samples on the record for the first to give the material a more modern feel, Power described the song as "a call to everyone, a beat for everyone to move to, like the old Kia-Ora advert with the dog and the crows". The song became the band's last top ten hit, peaking at No. 9. In a chart now awash with teen pop the album shot to No. 6. A second and final single was taken from the album "Magic Hour", which stalled at No. 28. Momentum was lost due to a lack of touring and Power also later criticised the choice of single, suggesting the band should have gone with something more uptempo. A planned third single was scrapped after disagreements between the band and label. Following the release and short lived promotion of the album, Power stated that he believed with three albums under Cast's belt that a chapter had finished.

Power began writing in early 2000 for the follow-up, Beetroot, released July 2001. Although the band were initially set to work with John Leckie, Power met producer and programmer Tristin Norwell who he was interested in working with, as he was "up on now, the sounds of now and someone who I can talk to with an acoustic". The pair worked on the album together for 3 months before moving to another studio, where other members of the band contributed. Bassist Peter Wilkinson was not present for much of the recording due to the birth of his son, guitarist Skin Tyson mostly featured only as rhythm guitarist and most of the drums were cut up and looped. The album was based largely on loops and featured heavy use of horns and flutes and deliberately moved away from the bands guitar sound, as Power claimed the band "wanted to come back with something that feels fresh and enticing", describing the material as being groovier and talked of having a desire of "combining this sort of Marley and funkadelic stuff or Sly and the Family that I'll get into as much as I get into Townshend and Lennon".

Only one single was released from the album, "Desert Drought" which stalled at No. 45 in the chart. The album fared worse, crawling to No. 78. Following the cancellation of a planned UK Autumn tour due to "internal band circumstances", Cast split in August 2001 just one month after the release of the album. It had been rumoured in the UK tabloid press that the band had been dropped by Polydor and that Power had walked out of the band. However, a spokesman for the band at the time denied the band were splitting, that they were merely taking time out to work on solo projects. John Power released a statement to deny any rifts in the band and that this was "just the beginning of a new musical chapter", but would later admit that there were many internal differences in the band by the end, that "some of the band didn't like it (the album Beetroot) and looking back, it should have been a solo album" and that half of the band didn't want to be involved any more. In 2013, Power admitted that the album was "still a slight bone of contention with the rest of the band. They've never got over it".

Power revealed that "when Cast split, it was the same as when The La's fell apart. You pretend everything is okay, but it's not. I was really down, really depressed".

=== 2001–2009: After split ===
Following the split, John Power released a solo album entitled Happening For Love in 2003 through Eagle Rock Entertainment and two further solo albums more in the acoustic folk vein through Tanuki Tanuki, a label set up by former La's A&R man and his then manager Jona Cox. He has toured regularly as The John Power Band (which has featured Steve Pilgrim of The Stands and Jay Lewis and Nick Miniski of the 2005 lineup of The La's) as well as performing solo acoustic shows. In 2005, Power played a series of gigs with newly re-formed The La's. The band didn't showcase any new material and have not been heard from again.

Peter Wilkinson, along with the band's live keyboardist Paul Ellison joined Echo & The Bunnymen and appeared on the 2005 album Siberia before leaving shortly after to rejoin the re-formed Shack. In 2002 he released a solo album via The Viper Label under the guise of Aviator with help from O'Neill, Paul Ellison and former La's guitarist Paul Hemmings. In 2003 Wilkinson and O'Neill briefly joined Kealer with Manchester singer-songwriter Jason Kelly and then set to work with ex-Stairs guitarist Carl Cook on a follow-up to the first Aviator album in early 2004 which was seemingly shelved. He then formed the short lived DC-10. Wilkinson has also recorded and toured with a number of other artists including Ian McCulloch and The Hours and more recently has started composing music for TV commercials.

Keith O'Neill, following stints with Aviator and Kealer went on to work as part of the management team at Deltasonic Records before going on to work as a tour and production manager with bands such as the now-defunct Liverpool band Dead 60s, Babyshambles, Art Garfunkel, Lostprophets. and Foals.

Liam Tyson joined Robert Plant's band, Strange Sensation in early 2002, touring Plant's album Dreamland before appearing on and co-writing the follow-up Mighty ReArranger. He then set about working on his Men From Mars project in 2004, originally set to feature Wilkinson and O'Neill, with others members of Strange Sensation.

=== 2010–present: Reunion ===
Power undertook a "Cast Acoustic Show" tour in June 2010, where he played a set of Cast songs along with new tracks written over the past year for a potential new Cast album. On 22 June, it was officially announced by NME that the band were to re-form, with plans to work on new material. The band toured the UK in November and December to mark the 15th anniversary of All Change. A deluxe edition of All Change was released on 25 October that year, to tie in with the re-union and 15th anniversary of the album, containing the original album re-mastered plus b-sides, outtakes, demos and live recordings.

On 6 November, John Power appeared on British TV show Soccer AM, and stated that Cast would be starting work on a new album in early 2011, and that it would be released via Pledgemusic.

Cast released their fifth studio album, Troubled Times, produced by John Leckie, initially as a download to pledgers through Pledgemusic on 2 November 2011, with a physical release in March 2012. The album featured drummer Steve Pilgrim, who also completed a short tour with the band in December 2011, due to O'Neill unable to take part in recording and touring due to work commitments as a tour manager. In response to a fan's query on Twitter, he stated that a tour in early 2012 should feature the original line-up unless he is "called upon by a major client".

The band released new song Baby Blue Eyes as a free download on 13 November 2014 from an as yet unrecorded and untitled album due for release in 2015. The band embarked on a UK tour in December 2014, with Steve Pilgrim once again filling in on drums for Keith O'Neill. Peter Wilkinson abruptly left the tour after the first night of the tour in Hull due to "personal reasons", and was replaced the following night by former La's guitarist Jay Lewis. O'Neill re-joined the band on the tour on 14 December, following the cancellation of the remainder of Johnny Marr's US tour which he was tour managing. During the tour, Power commented that Wilkinson "won't be back for a while he has some personal issues".

In March 2015, Wilkinson confirmed he had left the band and therefore wouldn't be working on their forthcoming album or touring with the band, stating that "without going into too much detail, I don't really want to do it any more" and added that "they play the same set we were playing twenty years ago and I just thought "I can't do that any more - I can't engage with it". Power responded, stating that "we can all breathe easier in the knowledge that all those moments of second guessing and all them feelings of negativity. The toxic and uncreative atmosphere where everyone was feeling something's not quite right were indeed actually quite right. So the weight of carting a problem from room to room has been lifted and Pete can liberate himself and liberate the rest of us from what was becoming a drag and we can get on with being a band and recording new material as opposed to trying placate someone whose body language was telling us something right from the off and that was Pete had bigger issues to deal with other than dealing with Cast."

Despite Wilkinson's departure from Cast, he would still involve his former band-mates in his project Aviator, with O'Neill on drums for live shows and Tyson contributing guitar on "The Gift". In May 2017, Wilkinson also tweeted that he had spent a couple of hours with Power, and Power confirmed the amicable nature of their encounter. Meanwhile, Cast resumed recording and touring with Jay Lewis as a full member of the band, with Power crediting Lewis as helping the band regain its creativity.

In November 2015, the band set up a Pledge Music campaign to fund the recording of their next studio album which was due for release in April 2016. The same year, the band signed to Creation Management, the newly formed music management company run by Alan McGee and Simon Fletcher. The album was delayed due to scheduling conflicts and continued work in the studio, and the band's sixth studio album Kicking Up the Dust was eventually released 21 April 2017. A band member had incorrectly claimed the main reason for the delay was that they had signed a major label record deal with Warner Music Group, but in fact they had self-financed the distribution of the album using Warners owned distribution network Alternative Distribution Alliance and remain unsigned.

Due to Tyson's touring commitments with Robert Plant to promote the latter's latest album Carry Fire (which includes several songs co-written by Tyson), he was unable to participate in Cast's UK shows from late November to mid-December 2017. In his absence, Lewis switched from bass to lead guitar, and filling in on bass was Martyn Campbell, best known as a member of The Lightning Seeds and a close friend of O'Neill's who had toured together with the drummer as part of Kealer's backing band. Campbell had also played bass on Power's debut solo album Happening for Love and on Richard Ashcroft albums. After fulfilling his duties with Robert Plant, Tyson returned to Cast halfway through their tour, in which they were the opening act for Shed Seven.

On 2 May 2018, Cast announced the November release of the compilation Singles 1995-2017, coinciding with a month-long, 13-date Greatest Hits Tour across the UK from 23 November to 22 December.

On 30 January 2020, Cast announced that they would be embarking on a UK tour that October to mark the 25th anniversary of their debut album All Change. The tour was postponed to April–May 2021 due to the COVID-19 pandemic, but finally went ahead after being rescheduled yet again to January and February 2022.

Meanwhile, John Power spent 2021 writing a new album that he described as "may well be Cast's last ever album". Produced by Youth with work concluding in 2023, the band recorded the album as a three-piece of Power, Liam Tyson and Keith O'Neill, with Power playing bass on an album for the first time since he was in The La's.

Following the completion of the album, John Power embarked on an October–November 2023 UK solo tour in which he performed a couple of songs from the new record, and on 28 October Cast released the title track and first single from their album Love Is the Call that Power described as feeling like "a missing link" between his time in The La's and Cast's debut album All Change. Second single "Love You Like I Do" followed on 5 December along with the confirmation of a 16 February 2024 release date for the album Love Is the Call, a February UK in-store tour and a March UK headlining tour. Cast were also confirmed as a support act for Liam Gallagher's June 2024 tour of UK and Ireland to commemorate the 30th anniversary of his former band Oasis' debut album Definitely Maybe. "Faraway", the third single from Love Is the Call, was released on 5 January 2024.

On 29 October 2024 it was announced by Cast that they would be supporting Oasis during their reunion tour in 2025 for the UK and Irish dates.

On 6 July 2025, Cast announced they had signed to Manchester independent record label Scruff of the Neck.

== Band members ==
=== Current ===
- John Power – vocals, guitar (1992–2001, 2010–present), bass (2022–present)
- Liam "Skin" Tyson – guitar, backing vocals (1993–2001, 2010–present)
- Keith O'Neill – drums, percussion, backing vocals (1993–2001, 2010–present)
- Jay Lewis – bass, backing vocals, keyboards (2015–2023, 2024–present; touring)

=== Former members ===
- Ged Malley – guitar (1992)
- Barry Sutton – guitar (1992)
- Peter "Cammy" Cammell – guitar (1993)
- Russell Brady – drums (1992–1993)
- Peter Wilkinson – bass, backing vocals (1992–2001, 2010–2014)

=== Former touring members ===
- Paul Ellison – keyboards
- Steve Pilgrim – drums (2011–2012, 2014)
- Martyn Campbell – bass, backing vocals (2017, 2024)

== Discography ==
=== Studio albums ===
List of studio albums, with selected peak chart positions and certifications
Title	Details	Peak chart position	Certifications (sales thresholds)
Title	Details	UK	Certifications (sales thresholds)
All Change	Released: 16 October 1995; Label: Polydor (529312); Formats: CD, CS, DL, LP	7	BPI: Platinum
Mother Nature Calls	Released: 14 April 1997; Label: Polydor (537567); Formats: CD, CS, DL, LP	3	BPI: Platinum
Magic Hour	Released: 17 May 1999; Label: Polydor (547176); Formats: CD, CS, DL, LP	6	BPI: Silver
Beetroot	Released: 30 July 2001; Label: Polydor (589096); Formats: CD, CS, DL, LP	78	
Troubled Times	Released: 2 November 2011; Label: Cast Recordings/Absolute (CASTRECCD1); Formats: CD, DL	117	
Kicking Up the Dust	Released: 21 April 2017; Label: Cast Recordings/Absolute (CST001CD); Formats: CD, DL, LP	49	
Love Is the Call	Released: 16 February 2024; Label: Cast Recordings/Absolute (CST002CD); Formats: CD, DL, LP	22	
Yeah Yeah Yeah	Released: 30 January 2026; Label: Scruff of the Neck; Formats: CD, CS, LP	8	

=== Compilation albums ===
- The Collection (2004)
- The Complete BBC Sessions (2007)
- Singles 1995–2017 (2018)

=== Live albums ===
- The Troubled Times Tour: Live 2012 (2012)
- Liverpool at Last (2013)
- All Change - 25th Anniversary Tour (2022)

=== Singles ===
Year	Title	Peak chart position		Album
Year	Title	UK	IRL	Album
1995	"Finetime"	17	—	All Change
1995	"Alright"	13	—	All Change
1996	"Sandstorm"	8	—	All Change
1996	"Walkaway"	9	23	All Change
1996	"Flying"	4	—	Non-album single
1997	"Free Me"	7	—	Mother Nature Calls
1997	"Guiding Star"	9	—	Mother Nature Calls
1997	"Live the Dream"	7	—	Mother Nature Calls
1997	"I'm So Lonely"	14	—	Mother Nature Calls
1999	"Beat Mama"	9	—	Magic Hour
1999	"Magic Hour"	28	—	Magic Hour
2001	"Desert Drought"	45	—	Beetroot
2011	"See That Girl"	—	—	Troubled Times
2012	"Time Bomb"	—	—	Troubled Times
2012	"Hold On Tight"	—	—	Troubled Times
2016	"Do That"	—	—	Kicking Up the Dust
2017	"Paper Chains"	—	—	Kicking Up the Dust
2023	"Love Is the Call"	—	—	Love Is the Call
2023	"Love You Like I Do"	—	—	Love Is the Call
2024	"Faraway"	—	—	Love Is the Call
2025	"Poison Vine" (featuring P.P. Arnold)	91	—	Yeah Yeah Yeah
2025	"Way It's Gotta Be (Oh Yeah)" (featuring P.P. Arnold)	—	—	Yeah Yeah Yeah
2025	"Calling Out Your Name"	—	—	Yeah Yeah Yeah
2025	"Free Love"	—	—	Yeah Yeah Yeah
