= Horse Fabulous =

Studio album by The Stands
- Released: 25 July 2005
- Recorded: Sunset Sound Studios
- Genre: Rock
- Label: Echo Records
- Producer: Tom Rothrock

The Stands chronology
All Years Leaving (2004)	Horse Fabulous (2005)

Professional ratings
Review scores
Source	Rating
Drowned in Sound	5/10
The Guardian	3/5 stars

Horse Fabulous is the second and final album by English band The Stands, released in 2005. The album was produced by Tom Rothrock and reached 62 in the UK album charts. "Do It Like You Like" was the first single released from the album, reaching number 28 in the UK singles chart and featuring in Rimmel's London Look advertising campaign featuring Kate Moss. Echo Records, fell into financial difficulty resulting in the second single from the album "When The Night Falls In" being cancelled at the last minute.

== Critical reception ==
The Guardian wrote that "vocalist Howie Payne has a way with a tune and enough Lennon-y caustic edge to his voice to make their second album more than just a retro trudge." GigWise wrote that "'Horse Fabulous' is a great record; a gorgeous, energetic, passionate rush of melodies and harmonies written for the sybaritic summer days yet to come.."

== Track listing ==
All songs written by Howie Payne.

1. "Turn The World Around"
2. "Soon Come"
3. "Just Enough Love"
4. "I Will Journey Home"
5. "Back To You"
6. "Mountains Blue And The World Through My Window"
7. "Nearer Than Green"
8. "When The Night Falls In"
9. "Bluer Than Blue"
10. "Do It Like You Like"
11. "You Said"

== UK singles ==
"Do It Like You Like"

- Release Date: 9 May 2005
- UK Chart: #28

7" (ECS165):

1. "Do It Like You Like"
2. "A Season To Be Loved"

CD (ECSCD165):

1. "Do It Like You Like"
2. "A Season To Be Loved"

CD (ECSCX165):

1. "Do It Like You Like"
2. "Into The Morning"
3. "One Of The Millions"

"When The Night Falls In"

- Release Date: 1 August 2005
- UK Chart:N/A
- Notes: Download only. Originally planned for 7" (ECS177) and CD (ECSCX177), though 7" copies exist with no barcode. Echo Records financial difficulties led to the cancellation of this release
