= All Years Leaving =

Studio album by The Stands
- Released: 23 February 2004
- Recorded: Abbey Road Studios; Olympic Studios; Wheeler End
- Genre: Rock
- Label: Echo Records
- Producer: Howie Payne

The Stands chronology
All Years Leaving (2004)	Horse Fabulous (2005)

Professional ratings
Review scores
Source	Rating
AllMusic	4/5 stars
The Guardian	3/5 stars

All Years Leaving is the debut album by English band the Stands, released in 2004. The album was produced by frontman Howie Payne and reached 28 on the UK Albums Chart. Four singles were released from the album, one reaching the UK top 30 and two reaching the top 40.

== Critical reception ==
The Guardian praised the album's "spiralling pyschedelia and timeless melodies." The Press wrote that the band "have that Liverpool knack of making melodies instantly familiar yet somehow not too familiar, while the band sounds as if they have been playing together, easy, gentle and harmonious, since birth."

== Track listing ==
All songs written by Howie Payne.

1. "I've Waited So Long" – 2:47
2. "All Years Leaving" – 3:44
3. "Outside Your Door" – 2:45
4. "When This River Rolls Over You" – 2:55
5. "It's Only Everything" – 2:51
6. "Always Is the Same/Shine On" – 6:30
7. "Here She Comes Again" – 2:15
8. "The Big Parade" – 2:57
9. "The Love You Give" – 3:09
10. "I Need You" – 2:37
11. "Some Weekend Night" – 2:38
12. "The Way She Does" – 5:21

== UK singles ==
"When This River Rolls Over You"

- Release date: 4 August 2003
- UK Chart: #32

7" (ECS142):

1. "When This River Rolls Over You"
2. "She Speaks of These Things"

CD (ECSCD142):

1. "When This River Rolls Over You"
2. "She Speaks of These Things"
3. "In So Many Ways"

"I Need You"

- Release date: 13 October 2003
- UK Chart: #39

7" (ECS146):

1. "I Need You"
2. "I Will Journey Home"

CD (ECSCD146):

1. "I Need You"
2. "I Will Journey Home"
3. "She Only Cares for Me"

CD (ECSCX146):

1. "I Need You"
2. "The Shape You're In"
3. "Still Water"
4. "I Need You" (music video)

"Here She Comes Again"

- Release date: 9 February 2004
- UK Chart:#25

7" (ECS148):

1. "Here She Comes Again"
2. "How You Seem to Be"

CD (ECSCD148):

1. "Here She Comes Again"
2. "Stumbling Home"

CD (ECSCX148):

1. "Here She Comes Again"
2. "How You Seem to Be"
3. "All Years Leaving" (acoustic version)
4. "Here She Comes Again" (video)

"Outside Your Door"

- Release Date: 24 May 2004
- UK Chart:#49

7" (ECS151):

1. "Outside Your Door"
2. "When This River Rolls Over You"

CD (ECSCD151):

1. "Outside Your Door"
2. "When This River Rolls Over You"

CD (ECSCX151):

1. "Outside Your Door"
2. "All That's Glass" (Home Recording)
3. "It Takes a While" (Home Recording)

== Personnel ==
- Howie Payne – guitar, vocals
- Steve Pilgrim – drums, backing vocals
- Luke Thomson – guitar, backing vocals
- Dean Ravera – bass guitar
- Noel Gallagher – guitar
- Bill Ryder Jones – piano
- Kevin Bacon – engineer, mixing
- Jonathan Quarmby – engineer, mixing
- Jan Stan Kybert – engineer
- Tom Sheehan – sleeve photo
