= Peter Wilkinson (bass guitarist) =

English bassist, singer and songwriter

- Born: Leslie Peter Wilkinson; 9 May 1969 (age 57); Liverpool, England
- Genres: Britpop, alternative rock
- Occupations: Musician, singer-songwriter and label owner of AV8 Records Ltd.
- Instruments: Bass guitar, guitar
- Years active: 1990–present
- Formerly of: Shack, Cast, Aviator, Echo & the Bunnymen, The Hours
- Website: aviator-music.co.uk

Leslie Peter Wilkinson (born 9 May 1969 in Liverpool) is an English bass player and singer-songwriter, formerly of Shack, Cast, and Echo & the Bunnymen. Additionally, he is the co-owner of AV8 Records ltd (with Nick Graff).

He is currently concentrating on his Aviator project and has performed with Shack.

== Biography ==
Although having taught himself to play bass at an early age by listening to new wave bands such as The Stranglers and Siouxsie and the Banshees, Wilkinson took an interest in jazz and went on to tour the jazz circuit across the north west of England and North Wales. He gained a college diploma in the genre before deciding that he would never be able to move out of the small clubs he was already playing whilst playing jazz.

In 1990, Wilkinson joined Shack, with whom he worked on the album Waterpistol. The album, however, would not be released until 1995, due to problems with the loss of the master tapes and the original record label folding, leading to the band splitting up.

In 1992, he co-founded Cast with former La's bassist John Power, who fronted the band.

Following the band's split in 2001, Wilkinson released a solo album in October 2002, Huxley Pig Part 1, under the guise of Aviator. He also began working as a session musician, playing with artists including Ian McCulloch, Echo & the Bunnymen, Canadian songwriter/vocalist Simon Wilcox and The Hours, with whom he took on lead guitar duties.

In 2005, Wilkinson rejoined the reformed Shack, who released two albums on Noel Gallagher's record label, Sour Mash.

Wilkinson also composes and performs music for TV commercials.

In 2010, Wilkinson re-joined the reformed Cast for a UK tour in November 2010. The band went on to release the album Troubled Times in 2012 with drummer Steve Pilgrim replacing Keith O'Neill, who was too busy tour managing to participate. Following an abrupt departure from a tour in December 2014, Wilkinson confirmed in March 2015 that he had left the band and wouldn't be working on their forthcoming album or touring with the band,

Wilkinson released the long-delayed Aviator follow-up album Huxley Pig, Part 2 in 2012 and follow-up single "Desolation Peaks" on limited-edition 7" via Eighties Vinyl Records in 2013. He released the third Aviator album, No Friend Of Mind, in August 2015 on his own label AV8.

In 2015 Pete started his own record label, AV8 Records ltd, with his friend Nick Graff. Releasing records by people such as Will Sergeant, Nick Power, Ian Skelly and Tommy Scott. Winning Best Independent Record label in the 2024 North West music awards.

== Associated acts ==
- Shack (1990–1991, 2005–present)
- Cast (1992–2001, 2010–2014)
- Aviator (2002–present)
- Echo & the Bunnymen (2001–2005)
- The Hours (2006–2007)
- Michael Blyth and the Wild Braid (2017–present)

== Discography ==
- Shack – Waterpistol (1995)
- Cast – All Change (1995)
- Cast – Mother Nature Calls (1997)
- Cast – Magic Hour (1999)
- Cast – Beetroot (2001)
- Aviator – Huxley Pig, Part 1 (2002)
- Ian McCulloch – Slideling (2003)
- Echo & the Bunnymen – Siberia (2005)
- Shack – ...The Corner of Miles & Gil (2006)
- Simon Wilcox – Charm and the Strange (2007)
- Baltic Fleet – Baltic Fleet (2008)
- Cast – Troubled Times (2011)
- Aviator – Huxley Pig, Part 2 (2012)
- Aviator – By the By: Unreleased Sessions 2002–2012 (2013)
- Michael Head & the Red Elastic Band – Artorius Revisisted (2013)
- Aviator – No Friend Of Mind (2015)
- Aviator – The Strawberry Field Sessions (2016)
- Aviator – OMNI (2018)
- David Boone – A Bubble to Burst (2018)
- Michael Blyth and the Wild Braid – Indigo Train (2018)
- Aviator – AV8OR (2022)
