= Liam Tyson =

English guitarist (born 1969)

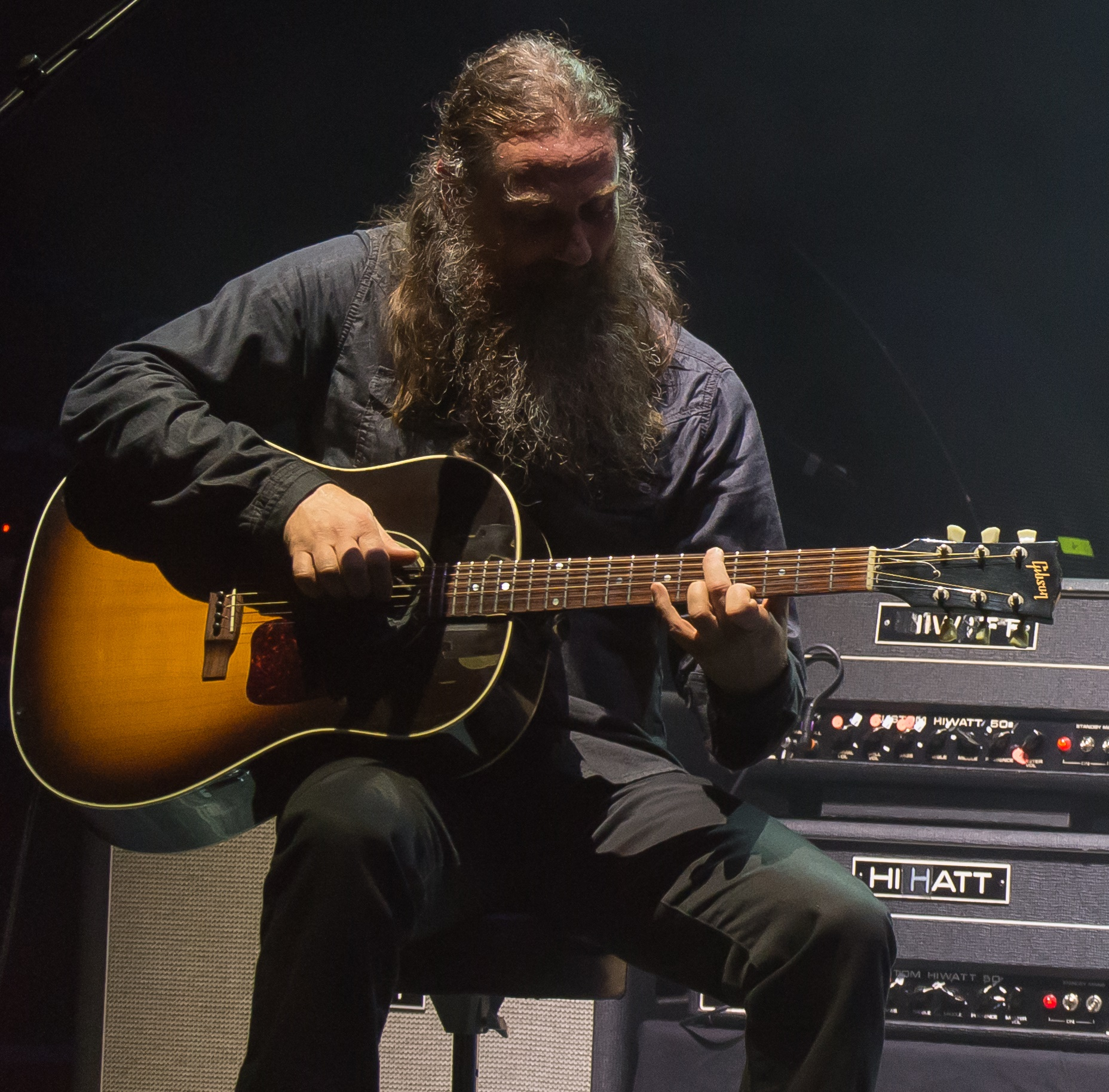
- Live with Robert Plant and the Sensational Space Shifters

Background information
- Also known as: Skin Tyson
- Born: Liam Sean Tyson; 7 September 1969 (age 57); Liverpool, England
- Genre: Alternative rock
- Occupation: Guitarist
- Years active: 1991–present
- Website: www.menfrommars.bandcamp.com

Liam Sean "Skin" Tyson (born 7 September 1969 in Liverpool) is an English guitarist, best known as the lead guitarist for Cast.

Tyson's first band, Pyramid Dream, gigged regularly around Liverpool in the late 1980s and early '90s. The band released one cassette album and appeared on compilation LP "One Summer In Liverpool". In 1991, the band toured Russia as part of a cultural exchange tour organised by Liverpool City Council. Tyson didn't contribute greatly to the compositions of this band, however his contribution lying in "total dedication to his instrument".

In 1994 Tyson joined Cast, the band formed by former La's bass player John Power. The band went on to sign to Polydor and released 3 studio albums, All Change, Mother Nature Calls and Magic Hour. In 2001 Power set to work on fourth album Beetroot, which featured little input from the other band members. The album moved away from the band's previous guitar sound and relied heavily on drum loops and sampled flutes and horns. The album failed to make the UK Top 75, and within two weeks the band cancelled a forthcoming tour to promote the album. Amid rumours of bust ups and being dropped by their record label, the band announced their split in August 2001.

Following the demise of Cast, Tyson went on to tour, record and write with Led Zeppelin frontman Robert Plant in his band "The Strange Sensation", following the departure of Porl Thompson in 2002. Now based in Snowdonia, during down time from the Strange Sensation Tyson began work on the project "Men from Mars", featuring members of The Strange Sensation and Pyramid Dream. The first Men From Mars album was eventually released in digitally in 2010 via the projects official Bandcamp page.

Cast reformed in 2010 and toured the UK in November/December 2010 to mark the 15th anniversary of the band's debut album All Change. The band went on to play further select dates and festivals throughout 2011 before releasing new studio album "Troubled Times" in March 2012.

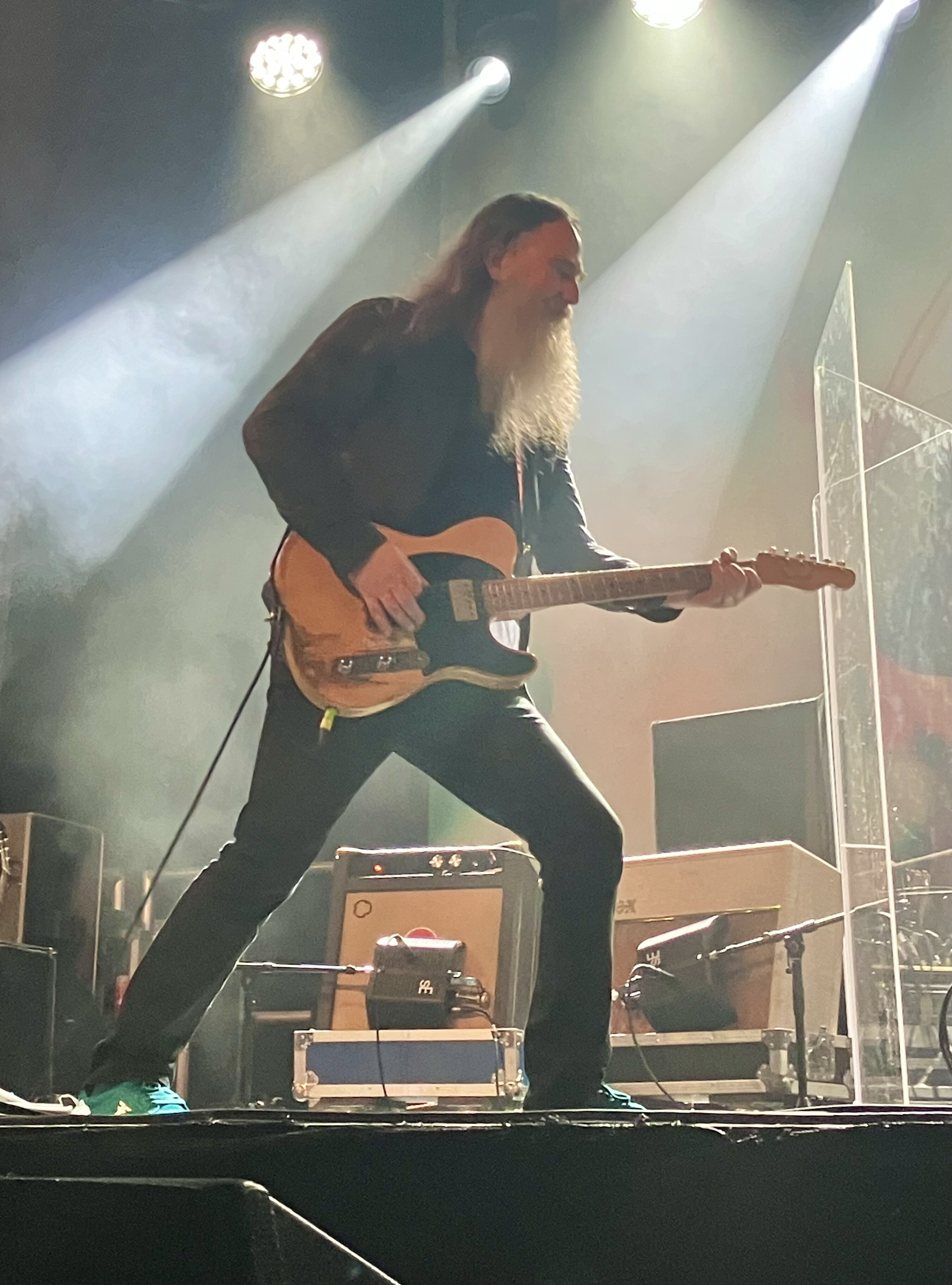
Tyson performing with Cast in 2024

In 2012, Tyson returned with other former Strange Sensation band members, with the addition of Dave Smith, Juldeh Camara and Patty Griffin, to back Robert Plant as Sensational Space Shifters, who debuted on stage in Gloucester on 8 May and continued to tour throughout 2012.

== Session discography ==
- Cast – All Change (1995)
- Cast – Mother Nature Calls (1997)
- Cast – Magic Hour (1999)
- Cast – Beetroot (2001)
- Robert Plant and the Strange Sensation – Mighty ReArranger (2005)
- Men from Mars – Men from Mars (2010)
- Cast – Troubled Times (2011)
- Robert Plant - "Carry Fire" (2017)
- Forgotten Pharos - King of Mirrors (2024)
