= John Power (musician) =

English singer-songwriter

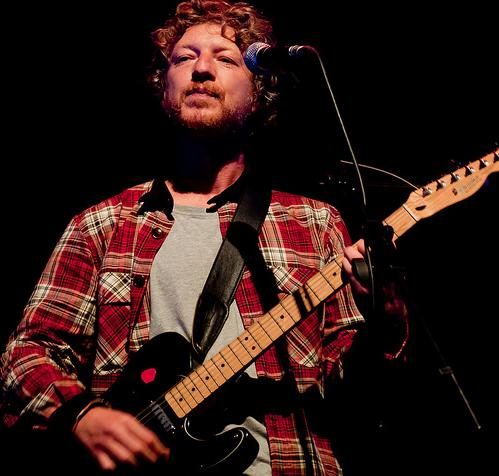
- John Power onstage Liverpool 2011

Background information
- Born: John Timothy Power; 14 September 1967 (age 59); Allerton, Liverpool, England
- Genres: Alternative rock; indie rock; Britpop; folk rock; acoustic rock
- Occupations: Singer, songwriter, musician
- Instruments: Vocals, guitar, bass guitar
- Years active: 1986–present
- Labels: Eagle, Tanuki Tanuki
- Member of: Cast
- Formerly of: The La's

John Timothy Power (born 14 September 1967) is an English singer, songwriter and guitarist. He is the frontman of the Britpop band Cast, and was the bassist and backing vocalist for the La's from 1986 to 1991. Following the dissolution of Cast in 2001, Power embarked on a solo career.

In 2005, he briefly reunited with the La's, who split up again without releasing new material. Cast reformed in 2010, releasing the album Troubled Times in March 2012, followed by Kicking Up the Dust in April 2017. Power was born in Allerton, Liverpool.

== The La's ==
Having previously struggled to find a permanent bass player since their formation, the La's recruited then 18-year-old John Power in July 1986 after he met Mike Badger at a course for unemployed musicians. Whilst still quite inexperienced on bass guitar, Power was mentored by Lee Mavers (a former bass player himself) and the core trio of Mavers, Badger and Power rehearsed and performed extensively until December 1986 when Badger left the band. The La's fanbase grew rapidly after the arrival of Power and the group recorded some of the demos which helped them gain a record deal the following year.

For the remainder of the La's' history, the band's line-up would change frequently with a constant duo of Lee Mavers (guitar, vocals) and John Power (bass, backing vocals) and various other guitarists and drummers. Power played on the band's early singles "Way Out" (1987) and "There She Goes" (1988) and was part of the recording of the band's debut album "The La's" released in 1990.

Whilst in the La's, John Power emerged as a songwriter himself and two Power-written songs "Alright" and "Follow Me Down" were performed live by the band during 1991. Following increased tension between Power and Lee Mavers, John Power left the La's in December 1991 and he went on to form Cast the following year.

It was then announced in 2005, that the La's were to reform for a series of headline and festival appearances in the UK, Ireland and Japan. Following these gigs and with no sign of new La's material, Power returned to his solo career.

== Cast ==
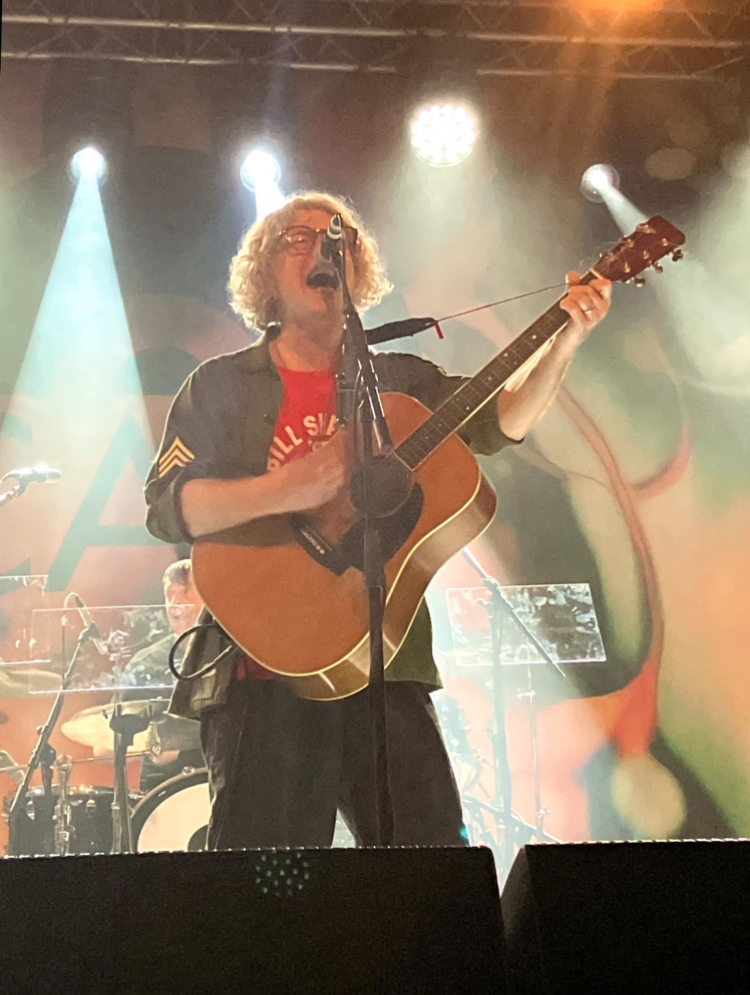
Power on stage with Cast in 2024

After leaving the La's in 1991 to form Cast, with whom he sang, played guitar and wrote songs, after four albums and a string of hit singles, Cast split in 2002.

After undertaking a solo "Cast Acoustic Show" tour in June 2010, Cast announced they would reform to work on new material and tour in November/December 2010.

== Solo career ==
Following the split, Power released the John Leckie produced solo album, Happening for Love in June 2003. Power would later comment on the album that "after the demise of Cast, I was still writing Cast-like tracks, but without the verve I had when I believed in it."

Following the La's reformation, Power went on to release 2 further solo albums, more in the acoustic folk vein on the Tanuki Tanuki label (set up by former La's A&R man and his then manager Jona Cox.), Willow She Weeps in October 2006 and Stormbreaker in January 2008. From 2006 to 2009, Power performed live with the John Power Band featuring backing musicians Jay Lewis (bass, slide guitar) and Steve Pilgrim (drums). Oli Hughes replaced Pilgrim as drummer after he left to play with Paul Weller. In 2013, Power played John Lennon in Bob Eaton's musical Lennon at the Royal Court Theatre. As of 2015, John is again performing a solo acoustic tour alongside Jay Lewis with a set of July dates scheduled in North West England.

== Other work ==
From 5 July to 16 August 2025, Power presented a Saturday afternoon show on Virgin Radio UK. Power returned to Virgin Radio UK for a one-off Christmas show on 24 December 2025.

Since 3 October 2026, Power has been hosting the 2pm to 6pm Saturday afternoon slot on Virgin Radio UK.

== Personal life ==
Power grew up in Allerton, Liverpool near Penny Lane and attended Quarry Bank Comprehensive School.

His son Fin (b. 1999) is also a musician and the lead singer of the band STONE. Power also has two daughters Hannah and Connie.

Power is a passionate supporter of Liverpool F.C. and has been keenly involved in the Hillsborough Justice Campaign. Power sang the lead vocal on the 2009 recording of "The Fields of Anfield Road", commemorating the 20th anniversary of the Hillsborough disaster.

In January 2024, Power received his Irish passport that he applied for as part of acknowledging his heritage and formalizing his ties to his Waterford-born father's country of origin.

== Political views ==
In November 2019, along with 34 other musicians, Power signed a letter endorsing the Labour Party leader Jeremy Corbyn in the 2019 UK general election with a call to end austerity.

== Solo discography ==
=== Albums ===
Studio albums

- Happening for Love (2003)
- Willow She Weeps (2006)
- Stormbreaker (2008)

Compilation albums

- Solo 2003–2008 (2019)

=== Singles ===
Year	Title	Peak chart position	Album
Year	Title	UK	Album
2003	"Beyond the Sun" (Desert featuring John Power)	137	Non-album single
2006	"Jumpin' Bean" / "Willow Weep"	—	Willow She Weeps
2009	"Fields of Anfield Road" (as part of Liverpool Collective)	14	Non-album single
2012	"He Ain't Heavy, He's My Brother" (as part of the Justice Collective)	1	Non-album single
