= Shed Seven discography =

British discography

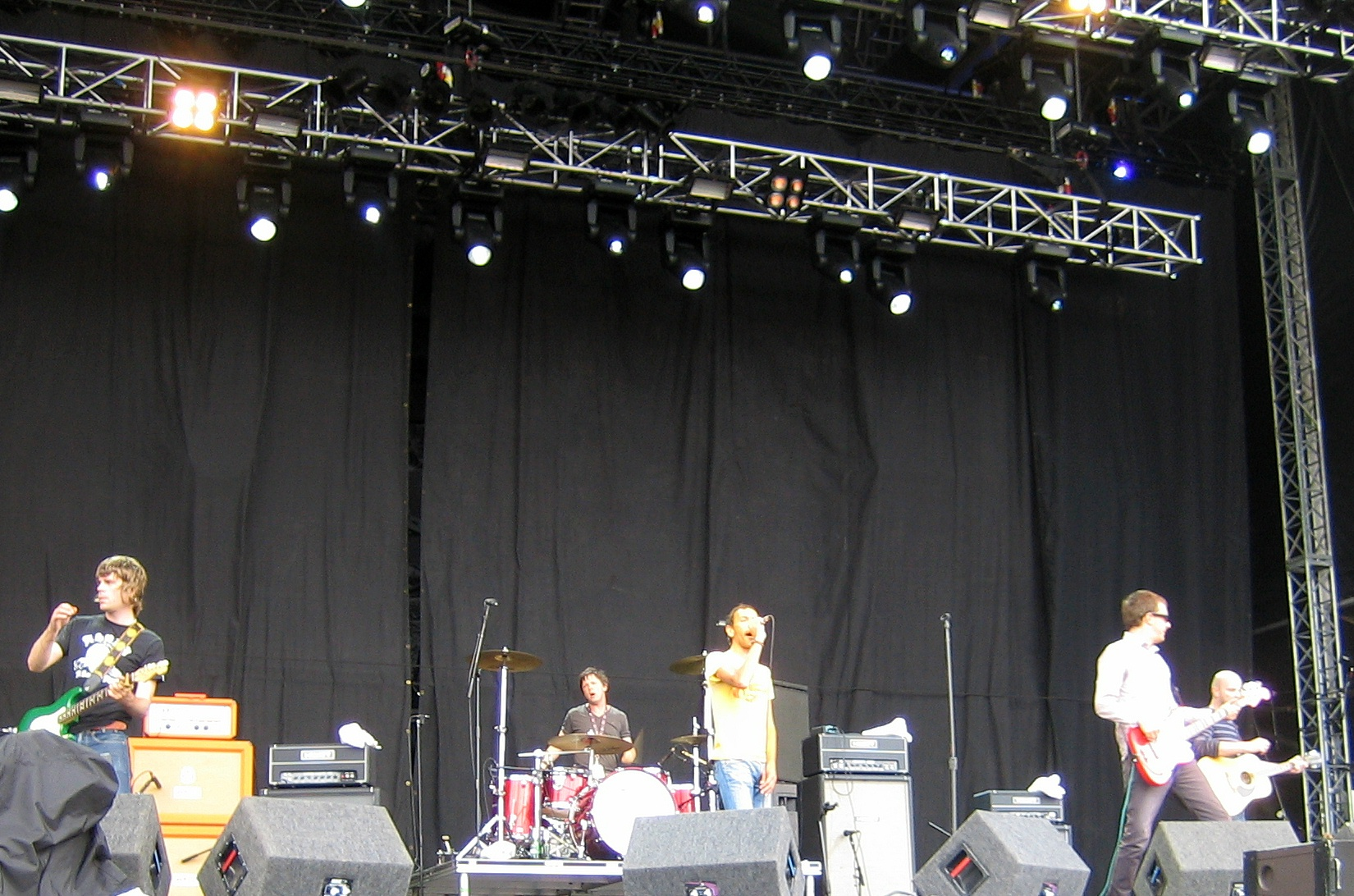
- Shed Seven performing at the V Festival; Weston Park, 2008
- Studio albums: 7
- Extended plays: 2
- Live albums: 4
- Compilation albums: 4
- Singles: 20
- Video albums: 2

The discography of Shed Seven, an English indie rock band from York, consists of seven studio albums, four live albums, four compilations, three videos, two extended plays and twenty singles.

== Albums ==
=== Studio albums ===
Title	Details	Peak chart positions	Certifications
Title	Details	UK	Certifications
Change Giver	Released: 5 September 1994; Formats: LP, CC, CD	16	BPI: Gold
A Maximum High	Released: 1 April 1996; Formats: LP, CC, CD	8	BPI: Gold
Let It Ride	Released: 1 June 1998; Formats: LP, CC, CD	9	BPI: Gold
Truth Be Told	Released: 7 May 2001; Formats: CD, 2×CD	42	—
Instant Pleasures	Released: 10 November 2017; Formats: LP, Red LP, 7×7", CC, CD, 2×CD	8	—
A Matter of Time	Released: 5 January 2024; Formats: LP, digital download, streaming, CD	1	—
Shed Seven	To be released: 8 January 2027; Formats: LP, CC, CD		
"—" denotes an album that did not chart or was not released.

=== Compilation albums ===
Title	Details	Peak chart positions	Certifications
Title	Details	UK	Certifications
Going for Gold: The Greatest Hits	Released: 31 May 1999; Formats: CC, CD, 2×CD	7	BPI: Gold
The Collection	Released: 11 October 2004; Formats: CD	—	—
One Hand Clapping: The Unreleased Demos 2001–2003	Released: 18 April 2005; Formats: CD	—	—
The Singles Collection	Released: 14 January 2008; Formats: 2×CD	—	—
Changed Giver	Released: 20 April 2024; Formats: LP, CD	—	—
Liquid Gold	Released: 27 September 2024; Formats: CD, LP	1	—
The Covers	Released: 12 April 2025; Formats: LP	—	—
A Maximum Lo Fi Edition	To be released: 8 January 2027; Formats: LP, CD	—	—

=== Live albums ===
Title	Details	Peak chart positions
Title	Details	UK
Where Have You Been Tonight? Live	Released: 26 May 2003; Formats: CD+DVD	113
Live at the BBC	Released: 11 December 2007; Formats: 2xCD	—
See Youse at The Barras: Live in Concert	Released: 11 May 2009; Formats: CD	—
Live at Leeds 2007	Released: 15 May 2009; Formats: Digital Download	—
Another Night, Another Town	Released: 18 December 2020; Formats: 2xCD, 3xLP	31
"—" denotes an album that did not chart or was not released.

== Self-released demos ==
Title	Details
Around Your House	Released: 1991; Format: CC
Shed Seven	Released: 1992; Format: CC

== Extended plays ==
Title	Details
6x7	Released: 1994; Format: CD; Compilation of the Dolphin and Mark/Casino Girl singles plus their respective B-sides.
Step Inside Your Love	Released: 29 October 2001; Format: CD; The lead track is an alternate version to the one included on the Truth Be Told album.
A Maximum High: 15th Anniversary EP	Released: 7 November 2011; Formats: CD, digital download

== Singles ==
Year	Title	Peak chart positions	Album
Year	Title	UK	Album
1994	"Mark" / "Casino Girl"	77	Change Giver
1994	"Dolphin"	28	Change Giver
1994	"Speakeasy"	24	Change Giver
1994	"Ocean Pie"	33	Change Giver
1995	"Where Have You Been Tonight?"	23	A Maximum High
1996	"Getting Better"	14	A Maximum High
1996	"Going for Gold"	8	A Maximum High
1996	"Bully Boy"	22	A Maximum High
1996	"On Standby"	12	A Maximum High
1996	"Chasing Rainbows"	17	Let It Ride
1998	"She Left Me on Friday"	11	Let It Ride
1998	"The Heroes"	18	Let It Ride
1998	"Devil in Your Shoes"	37	Let It Ride
1999	"Disco Down"	13	Going for Gold
2001	"Cry for Help"	30	Truth Be Told
2003	"Why Can't I Be You?"	23	Non-album single
2017	"Room in My House"	—	Instant Pleasures
2017	"It's Not Easy"	—	Instant Pleasures
2017	"Nothing to Live Down"	—	Instant Pleasures
2018	"Victoria"	—	Instant Pleasures
2023	"Kissing California"	—	A Matter of Time
2023	"F: K: H"	—	A Matter of Time
2023	"In Ecstasy"	—	A Matter of Time
2023	"Starlings"	—	A Matter of Time
2023	"Talk of the Town"	—	A Matter of Time
2024	"Let's Go Dancing"	—	A Matter of Time
2024	"Throwaways"	—	A Matter of Time
2026	"Stand Together"		Shed Seven
"—" denotes a single that did not chart or was not released.

== Videos ==
Title	Details
Stuffed	Released: 14 April 1997; Format: VHS; Features all the Shed Seven promo videos up to the date of release, along with album tracks and B-sides recorded live in concert at the Forum, London on 15 November 1996
See Youse at the Barras	Released: 22 September 2003; Format: DVD; Recorded live in concert at Barrowland, Glasgow on 3 December 2002

- Classic Shed Seven (2005) – DVD released as part of the Universal Masters DVD Collection series, the disc contains the promo videos of 10 Shed Seven singles.
- ’’Gold - The Videos’’ (2007) - DVD, features 13 promo videos in chronological order from Dolphin to Disco Down.
