= A Matter of Time (Shed Seven album) =

Studio album by Shed Seven
- Released: 5 January 2024
- Studio: Space Mountain (Spain)
- Genre: Britpop, indie rock
- Length: 50:10
- Label: Cooking Vinyl
- Producer: Youth

Shed Seven chronology
Instant Pleasures (2017)	A Matter of Time (2024)	Liquid Gold (2024)

Singles from A Matter of Time
- 1. "Kissing California" Released: 13 July 2023; 2. "F: K: H" Released: 1 September 2023; 3. "In Ecstasy (ft. Rowetta)" Released: 29 September 2023; 4. "Starlings" Released: 23 October 2023; 5. "Talk of the Town" Released: 24 November 2023; 6. "Let's Go Dancing" Released: 14 February 2024; 7. "Throwaways" Released: 12 April 2024

A Matter of Time is the sixth studio album by British rock band Shed Seven. It was released on 5 January 2024 through Cooking Vinyl Limited. The album marks their first studio release in over six years.

== Background ==
The announcement of A Matter of Time arrived alongside the lead single release of "Kissing California" on 13 July 2023. Produced by Youth, the band took a "nostalgic journey back to [their] roots", delving into the sounds that ignited their passion "for song-writing at the tender age of 12". As a result, Shed Seven reconnected with classic albums from their youth in order to get inspired. Release of the album coincides with the band's 30th anniversary, having released their debut album, Change Giver, in 1994.

Four other singles were release prior to the album - F:K:H, In Ecstasy, Starlings and Talk of the Town.

Peter Doherty featured on vocals for the album's closing song, Throwaways.

After topping the Album Chart in its first week, the album dropped to No.29 the following week.

== Critical reception ==
Professional ratings
Review scores
Source	Rating
Financial Times	3/5 stars
Buzz Mag	4/5 stars
Clash Music	7/10
Retro Pop Magazine	4/5 stars
RGM	Positive
Yorkshire Times	Positive
Now Spinning Magazine	Positive

Buzz Feed's Billy Edwards described the album as "strikingly immediate, accessible and fun".

Robin Murray of Clash Music reported that A Matter of Time was "remarkably effective" and noted the band had "sculpted some fine guitar tunes, blending subtle melancholy with surging choruses, and a kind of everyman wisdom."

RGM's Sam Bandock provided a track-by-track review, exclaiming "'A Matter of Time' is a wonderful album that just goes to show that Shed Seven have only become more complete as musicians over the years. The passion can be heard in every track and it is a solid listening experience."

Writing for Financial Times, Ludovic Hunter-Tilney thought that the lyrics "resemble flat-pack-assembled Britpop slogans", calling the music "meat-and-potatoes rock". However, Hunter-Tilney argued that Witter sings "heartily", while the bandmates "play with crispness and energy".

== Track listing ==
All lyrics are written by Rick Witter; all music is composed by Paul Banks.

A Matter of Time – Standard edition
No.	Title	Length
1.	"Let's Go"	2:21
2.	"Kissing California"	4:13
3.	"Talk of the Town"	4:26
4.	"Let's Go Dancing"	5:00
5.	"In Ecstasy" (featuring Rowetta)	4:41
6.	"Tripping with You" (featuring Laura McClure)	4:53
7.	"Let's Go (Again)"	0:27
8.	"Real Love"	4:11
9.	"F:K:H"	4:48
10.	"Starlings"	5:03
11.	"Ring the Changes"	3:56
12.	"Throwaways" (featuring Peter Doherty)	6:11
Total length:		50:10

A Matter of Time – Deluxe edition
No.	Title	Length
13.	"Watch Out World"	4:16
14.	"Feels Like Heaven"	3:53
15.	"Room In My House" (Live, Leeds Millennium Square)	6:01
16.	"Speakeasy" (Live, Leeds Millennium Square)	4:15
17.	"Kissing California" (Live, London Shepherd's Bush Empire)	4:16
18.	"High Hopes" (featuring Duke Witter; Live, Leeds Millennium Square)	4:23
19.	"Dolphin" (Live, Leeds Millennium Square)	5:10
20.	"A New England" (Live, Leeds Millennium Square)	2:59
21.	"Going for Gold / Suspicious Minds" (Live, Leeds Millennium Square)	6:30
22.	"F:K:H" (Live, Nottingham Rock City)	5:18
23.	"Long Time Dead" (Live, Manchester Albert Hall)	4:15
24.	"In Ecstasy" (featuring Rowetta; Live, Manchester Albert Hall)	5:09
25.	"The Heroes" (Live, Leeds Millennium Square)	7:01
26.	"Disco Down" (Live, Glasgow Barrowlands)	5:55
27.	"Starlings" (Live, Manchester Albert Hall)	5:03
28.	"Ocean Pie / On an Island with You" (Live, Middlesbrough Town Hall)	12:38
29.	"Bully Boy" (Live, Leeds Millennium Square)	2:58
30.	"It's Not Easy" (Live, Leeds Millennium Square)	5:16
31.	"Ocean Pie" (Live, Leeds Millennium Square)	4:25
32.	"On Standby" (Live, Leeds Millennium Square)	4:20
33.	"She Left Me on Friday" (Live, Leeds Millennium Square)	3:22
34.	"Where Have You Been Tonight" (Live, Leeds Millennium Square)	3:38
35.	"Talk of the Town" (featuring Jessica Steel; Demo)	3:40
36.	"Ring the Changes" (Demo)	3:40
37.	"Real Love" (Demo)	3:59
38.	"Let's Go Dancing" (Demo)	4:46
39.	"Starlings" (Demo)	4:21
40.	"F:K:H" (Jagz Kooner Remix)	5:48
41.	"F:K:H" (Jagz Kooner Dub Remix)	6:12
Total length:		193:37

== Personnel ==
Shed Seven

- Rick Witter – vocals, male harmony vocals, blossom tree photo
- Paul Banks – guitars, male harmony vocals, piano on "Starlings", back sleeve photo
- Tom Gladwin – bass, male harmony vocals
- Maxi – drums, percussion, male harmony vocals
- Tim Wills – keyboards, additional acoustic guitars

Additional musicians

- Violeta Vicci – strings
- Mary Pearce – backing vocals
- Beverly Skeete – backing vocals
- Rowetta – guest vocals on "In Ecstasy"
- Laura McClure – guest vocals on "Tripping With You"
- Peter Doherty – guest vocals on "Throwaways"

Technical

- Youth – production
- Frank Arkwright – mastering
- Cenzo Townshend – mixing
- Michael Rendall – engineering, string arrangements
- Rob Sellens – mixing assistance
- Camden Clarke – mixing assistance
- Elliot Verreux Debris – engineering assistance

Visuals

- Tommy Evans – artwork
- Barnaby Fairley – photography

== Charts ==
Chart performance for A Matter of Time
Chart (2024)	Peak position
Scottish Albums (OCC)	1
UK Albums (OCC)	1
UK Independent Albums (OCC)	1
