= Blinded by the Sun (song) =

1997 single by the Seahorses

Single by the Seahorses

from the album Do It Yourself
- B-side: "Kill Pussycat Kill"; "Moving On"
- Released: 14 July 1997
- Studio: Royaltone (North Hollywood, California)
- Length: 4:39 (album version); 3:36 (single edit)
- Label: Geffen
- Songwriter: Chris Helme
- Producer: Tony Visconti

The Seahorses singles chronology
"Love Is the Law" (1997)	"Blinded by the Sun" (1997)	"Love Me and Leave Me" (1997)

Music video
- "Blinded by the Sun" on YouTube

"Blinded by the Sun" is a song by English alternative rock band the Seahorses, released as the second single from their only studio album, Do It Yourself (1997), on 14 July 1997. Written by Chris Helme, it peaked at number seven on the UK Singles Chart. The single's cover art features a painting from 1997 by guitarist John Squire, also titled Blinded by the Sun.

== Track listings ==
All tracks were written by Chris Helme except track two, written by John Squire.

CD single

1. "Blinded by the Sun" – 3:36
2. "Kill Pussycat Kill" – 4:12
3. "Moving On" – 3:14

Cassette and 7-inch single

A. "Blinded by the Sun" – 3:36
B. "Moving On" – 4:12

== Credits and personnel ==
Credits are taken from the CD single notes and the Do It Yourself album booklet.

Studios

- Recorded and mixed at Royaltone Studios (North Hollywood, California)
- Mastered at Gateway Mastering (Portland, Maine, US)

The Seahorses

- Chris Helme – vocals, acoustic guitar, backing vocals
- John Squire – guitar, artwork
- Stuart Fletcher – bass guitar
- Andy Watts – drums, backing vocals

Additional personnel

- Tony Visconti – production
- Rob Jacobs – mixing, recording
- Jeff Thomas – assistant engineering
- Matt Squire – photography

== Charts ==
=== Weekly charts ===
Chart (1997)	Peak position
Europe (Eurochart Hot 100)	66
Scottish Singles Sales (Official Charts)	4
UK Singles (Official Charts)	7

=== Year-end charts ===
Chart (1997)	Position
UK Singles (OCC)	181

== Release history ==
Region	Date	Format(s)	Label(s)	Ref.
United Kingdom	14 July 1997	7-inch vinyl; CD; cassette	Geffen	
Japan	21 August 1997	CD	Geffen	
