= We Could Be Astronauts =

British rock band formed in York in 2009

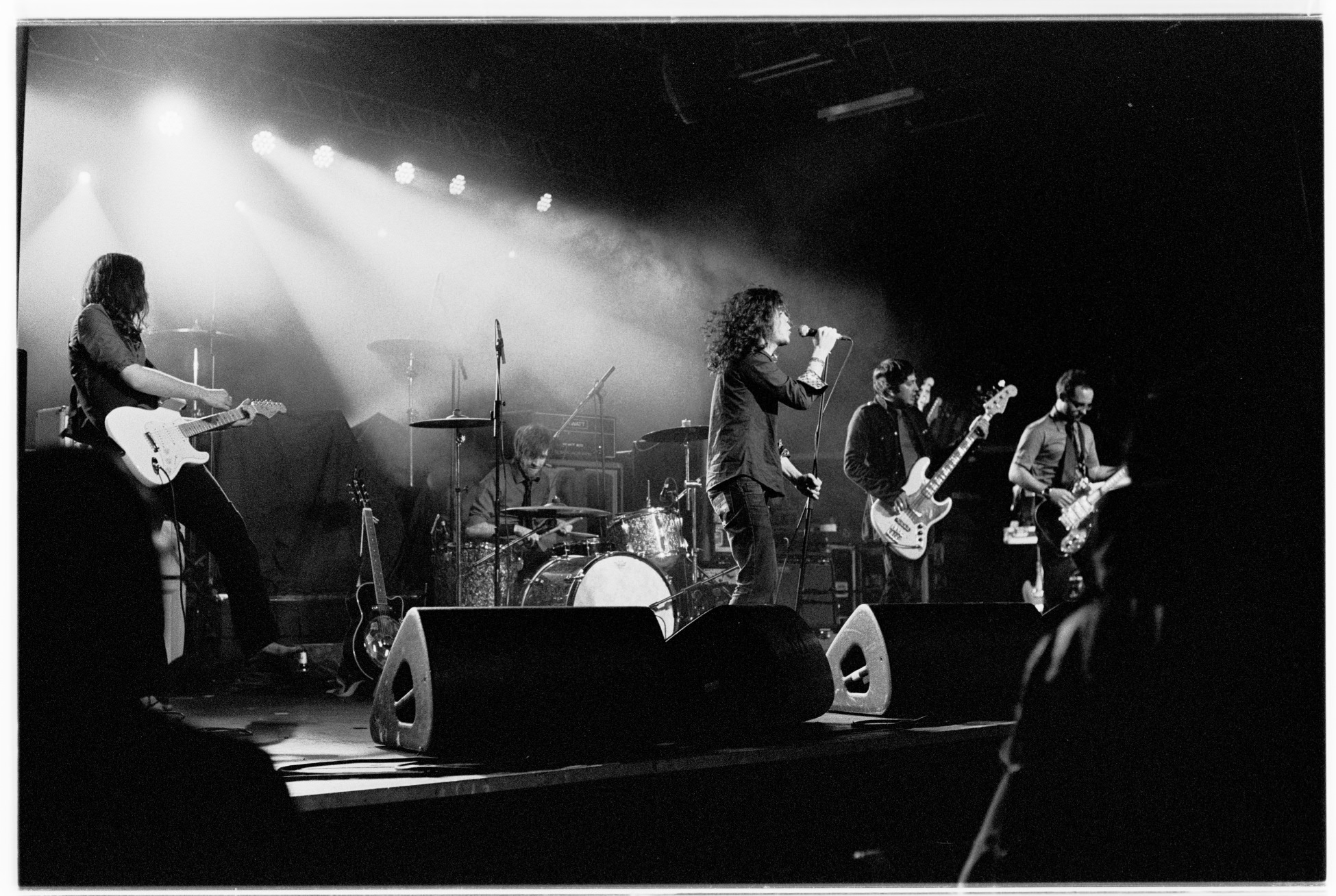
- Paul Heaney, Dave Hartley, Robert Hughes, Stuart Fletcher (musician), Simon Himsworth

Background information
- Origin: York, England
- Genres: Rock
- Years active: 2009–2018
- Label: Unsigned
- Members: Robert Hughes; Dave Hartley; Simon Himsworth; Paul Heaney; Stuart Fletcher (musician)
- Past members: Mark Meilack; Alex Smith
- Website: www.wecouldbeastronauts.com

We Could Be Astronauts were a British rock band that formed in York, England, in 2009. The band consists of Robert Hughes (vocals, guitar), Simon Himsworth (guitar, backing vocals), Stuart Fletcher (bass), Paul Heaney (guitar), and Dave Hartley (drums, backing vocals).

== History ==
In mid-2009, Dave Hartley and Mark Meilack, both formerly of Hijak Oscar, were approached by Robert Hughes with a demo CD of four tracks. Former Idle Jack drummer Simon Himsworth and York-based guitarist Paul Heaney joined shortly after. The name We Could Be Astronauts is based on a line taken from a One Eskimo song called "Astronauts". The actual line is "We can be astronauts".

Meilack left the band to move to Brighton to form a new band in October 2011. This opened a door for Stuart Fletcher who in the past played for The Seahorses, The Yards, and Rick Witter & The Dukes. Fletcher has also done session work for Happy Mondays, Saint Etienne, The Calling.

In December 2011 the band supported Shed Seven at the O2 Academy Sheffield. They were backed by York MP Hugh Bayley in the 2012 Rock The House competition. The band made it through to the International Finals of Surface Festival 2012 and played IndigO2#indigO2 in The O2 Arena (London) on 29 September 2012.

We Could Be Astronauts have been aired on local radio stations as band of the week on Minster FM and part of the BBC introducing show on BBC Radio York.

== Discography ==
- We Could Be Astronauts (2012)
- Death by Mau Mau! (2018)
