= Instant Pleasures =

Studio album by Shed Seven
- Released: 10 November 2017
- Genre: Britpop
- Label: BMG
- Producer: Youth

Shed Seven chronology
Truth Be Told (2001)	Instant Pleasures (2017)	A Matter of Time (2024)

Singles from Instant Pleasures
- 1. "Room in My House" Released: 21 September 2017; 2. "It's Not Easy" Released: 16 October 2017; 3. "Nothing to Live Down" Released: 1 November 2017; 4. "Victoria" Released: 23 March 2018

Professional ratings
Review scores
Source	Rating
The Guardian	4/5 stars
God Is in the TV	8/10

Instant Pleasures is the fifth studio album by the British rock band Shed Seven, released via BMG Rights Management in November 2017. The album charted at No.8 in the UK album chart, on sales of 13,277. It was Shed Seven's first album since 2001's Truth Be Told and marked the return of lead guitarist Paul Banks, who had last appeared on 1998's Let It Ride. The album cover features the red staircase at London music venue Scala.

== Track listing ==
Original album
No.	Title	Length
1.	"Room in My House"	5:06
2.	"Nothing to Live Down"	3:58
3.	"It's Not Easy"	5:03
4.	"Said I'm Sorry"	4:16
5.	"Victoria"	3:47
6.	"Better Days"	4:05
7.	"Enemies and Friends"	4:27
8.	"Star Crossed Lovers"	3:53
9.	"Hang On"	5:16
10.	"Butterfly on a Wheel"	4:00
11.	"People Will Talk"	3:56
12.	"Invincible"	3:58

Bonus 7" in 7x7" box set edition
No.	Title	Length
13.	"Flashbacks"
14.	"Everything Feels Alive"

Deluxe edition bonus CD
No.	Title	Length
1.	"Won't Get Home Tonight"
2.	"Waiting for the Catch"
3.	"Flashbacks"
4.	"Thank You"
5.	"Better Days" (Home Demo)
6.	"It's Not Easy" (Demo)
7.	"Brighter Skies" (Home Demo)
8.	"Room In My House" (Youth + Luke's Bingo Wings Beach House Mix)
9.	"Nothing to Live Down" (Youth + Luke's Autobahn Remix)
10.	"People Will Talk" (Youth + Michael's Berlin Disco Extended Mix)

== Personnel ==
=== Shed Seven ===
- Rick Witter – lead vocals
- Paul Banks – guitar, piano
- Joe Johnson – guitar, keyboards
- Tom Gladwin – bass
- Alan Leach – drums, percussion

=== Additional musicians ===
- Michael Rendall – additional keyboards, programming
- Matthew Hardy – trumpet
- Timothy Hurst – trombone
- Andrew Cox – saxophone
- Zara Benyounes – violin
- Jenny Sacha – violin
- Emma Owens – viola
- Rosie Danvers – cello, string arrangements
- Mary Pearce – backing vocals
- Beverly Skeete – backing vocals
- Lara Smiles – additional vocals on "Waiting for the Catch"

== Charts ==
Chart performance for Instant Pleasures
Chart (2017)	Peak position
Scottish Albums (Official Charts)	6
UK Albums (Official Charts)	8
