= Going for Gold (album) =

Going For Gold

Greatest hits album by Shed Seven
- Released: 31 May 1999
- Recorded: 1994–1999
- Genre: Rock, Britpop
- Length: 62:15
- Label: Polydor
- Producer: Jessica Corcoran, Chris Sheldon, Stephen Street

Shed Seven chronology
Let It Ride (1998)	Going For Gold (1999)	Truth Be Told (2001)

Singles from Going For Gold
- 1. "Disco Down" Released: 24 May 1999

Going For Gold is a singles compilation album by the British rock band Shed Seven, released in May 1999 via Polydor Records. The album features sleevenotes written by Mark Sutherland, the former editor of Melody Maker, who refers to the LP as the band's "Best of Album", whereas the album artwork itself carries the sub-title The Greatest Hits.

== Background ==
As well as compiling the band's singles from 1994 to 1998, Going For Gold featured newly recorded versions of two previous releases, "Dolphin" and "Ocean Pie", alongside brand new material in "Disco Down" and "High Hopes". "Disco Down" went on to become the last Banks-era hit for the band when issued as the album's lead single.

Like "Disco Down", the song was initially included in the album's track listing with the intention for it to be issued as a single, but was sidelined post-album release by the band's record label in favour of a proposed re-issue of their 1996 single, "Going For Gold". Following the band's refusal to comply, Shed Seven and Polydor Records parted company in late 1999, as "High Hopes" became the only track featured on the compilation which was not a 'hit' single, and Going For Gold became the band's final album release during their time with the label.

The Greatest Hits wasn't our idea – we felt it was a few years too early – but agreed to do it on the understanding that we would release two new singles from the album. 'Disco Down' did really well and we were all prepared to follow it up with 'High Hopes', the video script was approved and it was ready to go to radio, when some higher authority decided it would be a better idea to re-release 'Going For Gold' instead. We put our foot down and said 'no way, we are not going to rip off our fans with old material'. In fact, most people at the label thought it was an awful idea.

— Rick Witter, December, 1999

A limited edition 2-CD set was issued at the same time as the regular album and featured a bonus disc of four newly recorded session tracks – one song from each of their four studio albums to date (including Going For Gold itself) – two cover versions and a previously unreleased demo. To coincide with the release of the album, the band went on an 8-date 'Greatest Hits' tour of the UK, beginning at Bristol University on 12 May and ending in a hometown gig at York's Barbican Centre on 4 June.

== Critical reception ==
Professional ratings
Review scores
Source	Rating
AllMusic	4.5/5 stars
Q	3/5 stars
Select	4/5 medals
The Guardian	3/5 stars

Going For Gold received mixed reviews upon release. John Harris of Select felt that the album proved that the band have "always been blessed with the knack of creating admirably tidy, creditably catchy pop music" in his complimentary review, whilst AllMusic's Jason Damas labelled it "an excellent compilation of radio-ready rock & roll from one of the best singles bands of the 1990s". Howard Johnson of Q gave praise to the band's "epic sweep", but found fault with Witter's vocals, noting that;

...they do know a pop lick when they come across one... But you can't help wondering just how big they could have become if (Rick's) vocals had been truly distinctive rather than simply acceptable.

|NME's Victoria Segal, however, was less impressed with the LP, stating that the album "is a flooded engine of a record". Caroline Sullivan of The Guardian surmised that Going For Gold showed Shed Seven's "real talent" to be "persistence" and thought that the album lacked diversity; "Few of the tracks diverge from the doggedly catchy guitar rockin' model set by their first hit, Dolphin".

== Chart performance ==
=== Album ===
Going For Gold sold 130,000 copies in the UK, spending a total of four weeks on the UK album chart, peaking at number 7 on 12 June 1999.

=== Single ===
"Disco Down" was the one and only new single taken from the compilation and was the band's final single release from their six years with Polydor Records. It was released on 24 May 1999 and went on to spend a total of four weeks on the UK Singles Chart, peaking at number 13 on 5 June.

== Track listing ==
All songs written by Shed Seven, unless otherwise stated.

No.	Title	Writer(s)	Length
1.	"Going For Gold"		4:24
2.	"Disco Down"	Banks/Witter/Leach	3:50
3.	"Getting Better"		4:12
4.	"Chasing Rainbows"		4:23
5.	"Speakeasy"	Shed Seven/Witter	3:21
6.	"She Left Me on Friday"	Banks/Witter	3:29
7.	"On Standby"		3:53
8.	"Dolphin '99"	Shed Seven/Witter	3:50
9.	"High Hopes"	Banks/Witter	4:05
10.	"Bully Boy"		3:13
11.	"Devil in Your Shoes"	Banks/Witter	5:26
12.	"Where Have You Been Tonight?"		3:43
13.	"Ocean Pie"	Shed Seven/Witter	4:48
14.	"Mark"	Shed Seven/Witter	3:40
15.	"The Heroes"	Banks/Witter	5:44

- Track 4 is an alternate mix to the single version, reworked by Stephen Street.
- Track 5 is an alternate mix to the single version, reworked by Chris Sheldon.
- Tracks 8 and 13 are 1999 re-recordings

Limited Edition Bonus Disc
No.	Title	Writer(s)	Length
1.	"Disco Down" (Parr Street Session Version)	Banks/Witter/Leach	3:53
2.	"Going For Gold" (Parr Street Session Version)		4:20
3.	"The Heroes" (Parr Street Session Version)	Banks/Witter	4:21
4.	"Missing Out" (Parr Street Session Version)	Shed Seven/Johnson	3:24
5.	"Wired For Sound"	Robertson/Tarney	4:06
6.	"The Eye in the Sky"		3:22
7.	"Jumpin' Jack Flash" (Live)	Jagger/Richards	3:15

- Track 5 is a cover version of the 1981 Cliff Richard single.
- Track 6 is an unreleased demo from the Let It Ride album sessions.
- Track 7 was recorded live at London's Riverside Studios for TFI Friday and was previously released as a b-side on the band's 1996 single, "On Standby". The song is a cover version of The Rolling Stones' 1968 UK Chart No. 1 single.

20th Anniversary Gold Vinyl edition

side one
No.	Title	Writer(s)	Length
1.	"Going For Gold"		4:24
2.	"Disco Down"	Banks/Witter/Leach	3:50
3.	"Getting Better"		4:12
4.	"Chasing Rainbows"		4:23
5.	"Speakeasy"	Shed Seven/Witter	3:21

side two
No.	Title	Writer(s)	Length
1.	"She Left Me on Friday"	Banks/Witter	3:29
2.	"On Standby"		3:53
3.	"Dolphin"	Shed Seven/Witter	3:50
4.	"High Hopes"	Banks/Witter	4:05
5.	"Bully Boy"		3:13

side three
No.	Title	Writer(s)	Length
1.	"Devil in Your Shoes"	Banks/Witter	5:26
2.	"Where Have You Been Tonight?"		3:43
3.	"Ocean Pie"	Shed Seven/Witter	4:48
4.	"Mark"	Shed Seven/Witter	3:40
5.	"The Heroes"	Banks/Witter	5:44

side four
No.	Title	Writer(s)	Length
1.	"Disco Down" (Parr Street Session Version)	Banks/Witter/Leach	3:53
2.	"Going For Gold" (Parr Street Session Version)		4:20
3.	"The Heroes" (Parr Street Session Version)	Banks/Witter	4:21
4.	"Missing Out" (Parr Street Session Version)	Shed Seven/Johnson	3:24
5.	"Chasing Rainbows" (Live from the Forum, London 15.11.1996)
6.	"Bully Boy" (Live from the Forum, London 15.11.1996)

- Released 18 October 2019

== Personnel ==
=== Shed Seven ===
- Rick Witter – vocals
- Paul Banks – guitar, keyboards on 1994 – 1998 recordings
- Tom Gladwin – bass
- Alan Leach – drums

=== Additional musicians ===
- Fraser Smith – keyboards on 1999 recordings
- Clint Boon – keyboards on She Left Me on Friday and additional keyboards on The Heroes
