= Song Seven =

"Song Seven" may refer to:

- "Song Seven", a song by Shed Seven from the 1996 album A Maximum High
- "Song Seven", a song by Interpol from their 2001 Precipitate EP
