= Blinded by the Sun =

Blinded by the Sun may refer to:

- Blinded by the Sun, 1996 stage work by Stephen Poliakoff
- "Blinded by the Sun", a song by The Seahorses from the 1997 album Do It Yourself
- "Blinded by the Sun", a song by Gym Class Heroes from the 2008 album The Quilt
- Blinded by the Sun, a 2016 album by Phil Kieran
