= Chasing Rainbows (song) =

1996 single by Shed Seven

Single by Shed Seven

from the album Let It Ride
- B-side: "In Command"; "The Skin I'm In"
- Released: 4 November 1996
- Genre: Britpop
- Length: 4:17
- Label: Polydor
- Songwriters: Paul Banks; Rick Witter
- Producer: Chris Sheldon

Shed Seven singles chronology
"On Standby" (1996)	"Chasing Rainbows" (1996)	"She Left Me on Friday" (1998)

"Chasing Rainbows" is a song by Britpop band Shed Seven. It was released in November 1996 as the first single from their third studio album, Let It Ride, over a year before the album was released in June 1998. The homesickness-inspired song was written by band members Paul Banks and Rick Witter while on tour promoting their previous album, A Maximum High, and it was produced by Chris Sheldon.

The song was released on 4 November 1996 and debuted at number 17 on the UK Singles Chart on 17 November, becoming the band's ninth consecutive top-40 hit in the UK. In December 2025, "Chasing Rainbows" received a gold certification from the British Phonographic Industry (BPI), denoting sales and streaming figures exceeding 400,000 units.

== Background and release ==
"Chasing Rainbows" was written while Shed Seven were in Germany promoting their prior album, A Maximum High. Rick Witter said in an interview with Songwriting Magazine that they wrote the song during a murky afternoon while waiting to do their soundcheck. He was sitting in the band's tour bus with bandmate Paul Banks when Banks began composing the main riff on his guitar, then they wrote the lyric quickly afterwards, inspired by their homesickness resulting from constant travel. The two then took the song into soundcheck and received positive feedback, allowing them to record and release the song. Issued on 4 November 1996, "Chasing Rainbows" peaked at number 17 on the UK Singles Chart later the same month. Witter believed that if the song had been released on another week, it would have reached number one.

== Track listings ==
UK 7-inch, CD, and cassette single

1. "Chasing Rainbows"
2. "In Command"
3. "The Skin I'm In"

German CD single

1. "Chasing Rainbows"
2. "In Command"

== Charts ==
Chart (1996)	Peak position
Europe (Eurochart Hot 100)	61
Scotland Singles (OCC)	9
UK Singles (OCC)	17

== Certifications ==
Region	Certification	Certified units/sales
United Kingdom (BPI) Sales since 2011	Gold	400,000^{‡}
^{‡} Sales+streaming figures based on certification alone.
