= We Could Be Astronauts (album) =

2012 album by We Could Be Astronauts

Studio album by We Could Be Astronauts
- Released: 12 October 2012
- Recorded: Mid 2011 – mid 2012, at The White Rooms, York, England
- Genre: Alternative rock, post-grunge, hard rock
- Length: 58:33
- Label: Unsigned
- Producer: We Could Be Astronauts, Fraser Smith

We Could Be Astronauts is the first studio album by English alternative rock band We Could Be Astronauts. It was released on 12 October 2012.

The album was mixed and produced by ex Shed Seven keyboardist Fraser Smith who is a professional producer, songwriter and musician based in London, who also works in Artist Development and A & R / consultancy.

== Reviews ==
Sound Sphere Magazine Album Review

Whisperin And Hollerin Album Review

Track 10 from the album, 'Look Frank, It's A Toaster' received the most listeners votes on Tom Robinson's FreshNet website.

== Track listing ==
All songs written by We Could Be Astronauts.

No.	Title	Length
1.	"Astronauts Report: "It Feels Good""	2:57
2.	"Clockwok Cemetery"	5:26
3.	"The Volunteer"	4:54
4.	"Loose Lips"	3:59
5.	"The Catastrophist"	5:49
6.	"Fucked Up, Coroded, Broke Down, Exploded"	3:41
7.	"Lost At Sea (a Misanthropic Lullaby)"	4:44
8.	"Game Over"	4:22
9.	"Mary's Violet Eyes"	5:21
10.	"Look Frank, It's a Toaster!"	4:13
11.	"Astronaut Blues/Stop Including Me"	3:36
12.	"Good As Gone"	9:31
Total length:		58:33
