= A Maximum High =

Studio album by Shed Seven
- Released: 1 April 1996
- Recorded: 1995–1996
- Studio: RAK, Master Rock (London, England)
- Genre: Rock, Britpop
- Length: 50:31
- Label: Polydor
- Producer: Chris Sheldon

Shed Seven chronology
Change Giver (1994)	A Maximum High (1996)	Let It Ride (1998)

Singles from A Maximum High
- 1. "Where Have You Been Tonight?" Released: 1 May 1995; 2. "Getting Better" Released: 15 January 1996; 3. "Going for Gold" Released: 11 March 1996; 4. "Bully Boy" Released: 6 May 1996; 5. "On Standby" Released: 19 August 1996

A Maximum High is the second studio album by the British rock band Shed Seven, released in April 1996 via Polydor Records. The album was written by all four band members at the time of release; Rick Witter, Paul Banks, Tom Gladwin and Alan Leach. The album title comes from lyrics in the song "Parallel Lines".

== Background and recording ==
Shed Seven held writing and rehearsal sessions at a local potato plant, RS Cockerill's of York, prior to recording the album. One of the first tracks recorded, with their new producer Chris Sheldon, was the lead single, "Where Have You Been Tonight?", written in late 1994 and debuting live at the band's Christmas show on 23 December. It was one of five tracks completed during a three-week recording session at RAK Studios in February 1995, before the band departed midway through the mixing process at Metropolis to embark on their first tour of Japan, satisfied with what they had achieved;

We walked away from these recordings feeling completely happy. They perfectly capture the sound of Shed Seven.

— Paul Banks, 1995

Along with the lead single, they completed a further four songs during their first stint in the recording studio; "This Day Was Ours", "Bully Boy", an untitled track, which was said to be the first Shed Seven song to feature drummer Alan Leach on lead vocals, and "Lies". This version of "Lies" was previewed on an NME compilation cassette given away free with their 6 May 1995 issue, almost a year before the album was released. Following gigs in Spain and Japan, the band headed back to the studio in May 1995 to begin work on further material for inclusion on the album, which, at that point, was titled In Colour. Numerous tracks recorded in this period feature the highly renowned session musicians, The Kick Horns and The Phantom Horns, adding a brassier undertone to the featured songs and marking a notable change in sound to that of the band's previous output.

== Critical reception ==
Professional ratings
Review scores
Source	Rating
AllMusic	4/5 stars
The Guardian	3/5 stars
NME	8/10
Select	3/5 medals

A Maximum High garnered a generally positive response from critics upon release. Ian Harrison of Select drew a number of comparisons with the Smiths in his review, summarising the album as "sexy, Smiths-fuelled and superb";

(I)t's apparent that Shed Seven's closest inspiration isn't Northside or The Railway Children, but The Smiths. Of all the contenders to be the heirs to The Hated Salford Ensemble, this band pull it off with the best spirit and the fewest groaning timbers. Continually there're the lilting/grinding guitars à la Marr, while Rick's voice twists and soars like Moz pre-Brendan Behan look-alike period.

He went on to liken the "jugular-directed guitar attacks" to that of their debut album, but also noted a distinct change "of a band trying new moves and a richer sound". This change of sound was also noted by Mark Sutherland, writing for the NME in April 1996, who stated that "the Sheds have rocketed on so far from '94's 'Change Giver', they could actually rewrite the traditional album reviewers lexicon" and went on to compare the band to The Stone Roses;

Certainly, the tough, ultra-confident, tune-stuffed 'outfit' here are, Witter's emotional foghorn vocals apart, barely recognisable from the scruffy tykes on the flashy, but ultimately unsatisfying, 'Change Giver'. Indeed, parts of it are good enough to pass as someone else's second album: chiefly, the record The Stone Roses should have made instead of 'The Second Coming'.

Writing for The Guardian in April 1996, Caroline Sullivan labelled A Maximum High "good, but not outstanding", as she praised guitarist Paul Banks's "exultant jangling", but found fault with the album's lyrical content. The LP has also been referred to as "the band's most consistently engaging album (...) full of inspirational anthems [and] excellent shout-along, arena-ready numbers."

== Alternate editions ==
A Maximum High Special Edition CD cover.

A limited edition double CD version of the album titled A Maximum High Special Edition was released in September 1996, five months after the regular issue. It featured a bonus disc of many of the band's b-sides from their first 9 single releases, along with an alternate piano version of the album track "Out by My Side" and an expanded album cover with additional lyrics and photographs. The Special Edition was released for the first time on vinyl to coincide with the 25th anniversary of the album in 2021.

Aside from the two UK releases, the French limited edition was issued with a free bonus disc in a cardboard slipcase featuring two live tracks—"Mark" and "Dolphin"—recorded at the Hanover Grand, London on 30 January 1996. The former track was later issued in the UK in May 1996 as a b-side to "Bully Boy" – the fourth single taken from A Maximum High – whilst the latter remains exclusive to the bonus disc. The Japanese version of the album also featured additional material, a bonus track titled "Song Seven", which was to be found as a b-side on the band's UK single "Getting Better", released in January 1996.

== Chart performance ==
=== Album ===
A Maximum High spent a total of 26 weeks in the UK album chart, peaking at number 8 on 13 April 1996, with the Special Edition reissue peaking at number 13. Discounting the band's singles compilation which reached number 7 three years later, chart-wise, A Maximum High is Shed Seven's most successful album to date. It has sold 186,325 copies in the United Kingdom as of November 2017.

=== Singles ===
The album spawned five Top 40 UK hit singles for the band in "Where Have You Been Tonight?", "Getting Better", "Going For Gold", "On Standby" and "Bully Boy". Each single release entered the chart at number 23 or higher, including their biggest hit to date, "Going For Gold", which peaked at number 8 in March 1996.

== Track listing ==
All tracks written by Witter/Banks/Gladwin/Leach.

Original album
No.	Title	Length
1.	"Getting Better"	4:12
2.	"Magic Streets"	4:05
3.	"Where Have You Been Tonight?"	3:44
4.	"Going for Gold"	4:25
5.	"On Standby"	3:54
6.	"Out by My Side"	2:28
7.	"Lies"	4:12
8.	"This Day Was Ours"	3:23
9.	"Ladyman"	4:15
10.	"Falling from the Sky"	3:55
11.	"Bully Boy"	3:15
12.	"Parallel Lines"	8:43
13.	"Song Seven"	3:16

Track 13 is bonus track included on the Japanese edition of the album.

Special Edition
No.	Title	Length
1.	"Long Time Dead" (New Version)	4:02
2.	"Around Your House"	3:08
3.	"Swing My Wave"	4:43
4.	"Out by My Side" (Piano Version)	2:34
5.	"Immobilise"	3:20
6.	"Killing Time"	4:21
7.	"This Is My House"	2:34
8.	"Sensitive"	4:21
9.	"Barracuda"	3:53
10.	"Mobile 10"	2:36
11.	"Stepping on Hearts"	3:40
12.	"Never Again"	3:40
13.	"Song Seven"	3:16
14.	"Making Waves"	4:34
15.	"Sleep Easy"	3:23
16.	"Only Dreaming"	5:35

- Track 4 is exclusive to this album release.
- Tracks 1, 6 and 11 are taken from the 1996 single, "On Standby".
- Track 2 is taken from the 1994 single, "Speakeasy".
- Tracks 3 and 7 are taken from the 1995 single, "Where Have You Been Tonight?".
- Track 5 is taken from the 1994 single, "Dolphin".
- Tracks 8, 12 and 15 are taken from the 1994 single, "Ocean Pie".
- Tracks 9 and 14 are taken from the 1996 single, "Going For Gold".
- Track 10 is taken from the 1994 double A side single, "Mark/Casino Girl".
- Tracks 13 and 16 are taken from the 1996 single, "Getting Better".
- Production on the tracks included on the Special Edition bonus disc was done by Shed Seven, Chris Sheldon, Jessica Corcoran, Tim Lewis and Simon Wall.

Special Edition originally released 16 September 1996

2014 Bonus CD
No.	Title	Length
1.	"Killing Time" (B-side to on Standby)
2.	"This Is My House" (B-side to Where Have You Been Tonight?)
3.	"Swing My Wave" (B-side to Where Have You Been Tonight?)
4.	"Barracuda" (B-side to Going For Gold)
5.	"Only Dreaming" (B-side to Getting Better)
6.	"Where Have You Been Tonight?" (Mark Radcliffe BBC Session)
7.	"Bully Boy" (live at Glastonbury 1995)
8.	"Parallel Lines" (live at Leeds Sound City 1996, incorrectly listed as 1995)
9.	"Getting Better" (demo version)
10.	"On Standby" (demo version)
11.	"Out by My Side" (demo version)
12.	"Magic Streets" (demo version)
13.	"Going For Gold" (A Maximum High 15th Anniversary EP version 2011)

2014 Edition released 4 August 2014

25th Anniversary Edition bonus LP - Shed Seven In Colour - Live At The Hanover Grand. 30.01.96
No.	Title	Length
1.	"Dirty Soul"
2.	"Around Your House"
3.	"Long Time Dead"
4.	"Bully Boy"
5.	"Where Have You Been Tonight?"
6.	"Dolphin"
7.	"Song Seven"
8.	"Going For Gold"
9.	"Speakeasy"
10.	"Getting Better"

25th Anniversary Edition bonus CD - Max-HiRange - Demonstration Tape
No.	Title	Length
1.	"Getting Better (Demo)"
2.	"Magic Streets (Demo)"
3.	"Where Have You Been Tonight (Demo)"
4.	"Going For Gold (Acoustic)"
5.	"On Stand By (Demo)"
6.	"Out By My Side (Demo)"
7.	"Lies (Demo)"
8.	"This Day Was Ours (Killing Me Softly)"
9.	"Lady Man (Acoustic)"
10.	"Falling From The Sky (Acoustic)"
11.	"Bully Boy (Instrumental)"
12.	"Parallel Lines (Instrumental)"
13.	"Instrumental Demo '95 One"
14.	"Instrumental Demo '95 Two"
15.	"Instrumental Demo '95 Three"

25th Anniversary Edition released 26 November 2021

== Personnel ==
Shed Seven

- Rick Witter – vocals, piano, glockenspiel
- Paul Banks – guitars, hammond organ, piano, harpsichord
- Tom Gladwin – bass
- Alan Leach – drums, percussion, bongos

Additional musicians

- The Phantom Horns (featuring Gary Barnacle and John Thirkell) – horns, brass on "Going For Gold" and "Getting Better"
- Kate St John – oboe
- The Kick Horns – brass
- Audrey Riley – strings
- Richard Wailer – backing vocals
- Shakiran Alexander – backing vocals
- James Taylor – hammond organ

Technical personnel

- Chris Sheldon – producer, mixer
- Pete Hoffman – recording
- Graeme Stewart – assistant engineer
- Shelley Saunders – assistant engineer
- Matt Howe – assistant engineer
- Stylorouge – cover design
- George Logan – front cover and band photography
- Paul Stanley – photography
- Gavin Kingcome – photography
- Mark Thomson – photography
- Carl Rush – photography
- Simon Fowler – photography
