= Truth Be Told (Shed Seven album) =

Truth be Told

Studio album by Shed Seven
- Released: 7 May 2001
- Recorded: 2000–2001
- Studios: Chapel, Lincolnshire
- Genre: Rock
- Length: 40:50
- Label: Artful
- Producers: Shed Seven, Adi Winman

Shed Seven chronology
| Going for Gold (1999) | Truth be Told (2001) | Instant Pleasures (2017) |

Singles from Truth Be Told
- 1. "Cry for Help" Released: 23 April 2001

Professional ratings
Review scores
| Source | Rating |
|---|---|
| Allmusic | 2/5 stars |
| Atomic Duster | 4/5 stars |
| Drowned In Sound | (8/10) |
| Entertainment.ie | 3/5 stars |
| NME | (5/10) |
| The Guardian | 3/5 stars |
| Yahoo! Music | 6/10 stars |

Truth Be Told is the fourth studio album by the British rock band Shed Seven, released via Artful Records in May 2001. Initial copies of the album featured a limited edition bonus disc with additional CD-ROM material along with an exclusive bonus track.

== Background ==
The album is the first to feature original guitarist Joe Johnson, who left the band in 1993 before the release of their debut album, Change Giver. He had been replaced by new guitarist Paul Banks, who left the band in December 1999 prior to the band re-recruiting Johnson to fill the void.

== Track listing ==
All tracks written by Johnson/Smith/Witter.

| No. | Title | Length |
|---|---|---|
| 1. | "If the Music Don't Move Yer" | 3:48 |
| 2. | "Eyes Before" | 4:05 |
| 3. | "Cry for Help" | 3:53 |
| 4. | "Thinking Again" | 3:40 |
| 5. | "Be Myself" | 2:58 |
| 6. | "Laughter Lines" | 4:04 |
| 7. | "Feathers" | 4:13 |
| 8. | "Never Felt So Cold" | 2:54 |
| 9. | "To the Wind" | 3:27 |
| 10. | "Love Equals" | 2:30 |
| 11. | "Step Inside Your Love" | 5:17 |

Limited Edition Bonus Disc
| No. | Title | Length |
|---|---|---|
| 1. | "Hark! The Foe Is Advancing" | 3:49 |

- Track 11 is an alternate version to the one included on the Step Inside Your Love EP issued in October 2001.

== Personnel ==
=== Shed Seven ===
- Rick Witter – lead vocals
- Tom Gladwin – bass
- Alan Leach – drums
- Joe Johnson – guitar
- Fraser Smith – keyboards, backing vocals, string arrangement

=== Additional musicians ===
- Vince Parsonage – string arrangement, viola
- Tamsin Symmons – violin
- Sally Ladds – cello
- James Lancaster – brass

=== Technical personnel ===
- Shed Seven – producer, arranger
- Adi Winman – producer
- Will Bartle – assistant engineer
- Chris Sheldon – executive producer, mixing
- Adam Nunn – mastering
- Tom Howard – band photography
- thelongdrop – art direction, photography
