= Be Myself (disambiguation) =

Be Myself is a 2017 album by Sheryl Crow, or its title song.

Be Myself may also refer to:

- "Be Myself", a song by Murphy Lee from Murphy's Law, 2003
- "Be Myself", a song by Shed Seven from Truth Be Told, 2001
- "Be Myself", a song by Tom Walker from What a Time to Be Alive, 2019
- "Be Myself", a song by Why Don't We from The Good Times and the Bad Ones, 2021
