= The Seahorses =

English rock band

- L-R: Stuart Fletcher; John Squire, Chris Helme; Andy Watts

Background information
- Origin: York, England
- Genres: Alternative rock, indie rock, Britpop
- Years active: 1996–1999
- Label: Geffen
- Past members: John Squire; Stuart Fletcher; Chris Helme; Andy Watts; Mal Scott; Toby Drummond; Mark Heaney

The Seahorses were an English alternative rock band, formed in York in 1996 by guitarist John Squire, following his departure from the Stone Roses.

The band released their debut album Do It Yourself in 1997, and began to work on a follow-up before splitting up due to musical differences, during recording sessions in January 1999.

Commenting on the band in 2002, Squire stated that he had "rushed into that one. The Seahorses was more a rash reaction to leaving the Roses than a considered option", and that "I don't think I'm the kind of artist who can cope in a proper band democracy. I require too much control. I hate having my ideas refracted through someone else. I've tried in the past to be accommodating and make the band a complete outfit, but only to have it thrown back in my face. I'm loath to ever do that again".

== Formation and initial media interest ==
Squire formed the Seahorses in 1996 following his departure from the Stone Roses. He first recruited bassist Stuart Fletcher, who he saw by chance at the Fibbers venue in York where he was drinking with his guitar tech Martin Herbet. Fletcher was playing in local covers band, the Blueflies, as a last-minute replacement for the band's regular bass player who had pulled out of the gig. Squire then auditioned two singers – Sean O'Brien, previously of Warrington band the Steamboat Band, and Chris Helme, who was spotted by a friend of Squire's guitar tech busking outside Woolworths in York. Following several auditions and the prompting of his manager, Squire eventually settled on Helme, despite being hesitant because he "closed his eyes when he sang and only folk singers do that". While Helme was also a songwriter, Squire admitted early on that despite liking a couple of Helme's songs – including "Blinded by the Sun", which he re-arranged for the album – "Yeah, he can write the odd tune but I don't really like them and it might be a problem later on if he wants to record them with the band".

In the summer of 1996, Squire rented a cottage in Coniston, Cumbria to write and rehearse with Helme and Fletcher. Several drummers were auditioned before finally recruiting Andy Watts, who had previously gigged with Fletcher and also knew Helme.

Due to Squire's past work with the Stone Roses, the band were met with intense media interest and speculation before they had recorded or released anything. It had been rumoured that former bandmate Reni was set to join the band. It was then rumoured that a delay in recruiting a drummer was due to Squire's desire to get a drummer who, like Reni, could also sing backing vocals. However, in 2019 bassist Stuart Fletcher revealed that they had actually been working with a drummer called Mark McNeill who had to be dismissed from the band following several failed rehab visits as "he couldn’t remember anything we rehearsed". The band name was also the subject of various conspiracy theories after the NME claimed that it was an anagram of He Hates Roses. Other alleged anagrams included The Rose Ashes and by dropping the definite article, She's A Rose. Squire responded "That's pure coincidence. I chose the name because at the time, I kept seeing them everywhere and because some people think they don't exist. They are unusual because it is the male of the species who gets pregnant." Squire then changed the band's name from The Seahorses to simply Seahorses, but this was short lived after it turned out that another band had been using the name for several years.

== Do it Yourself ==
Just weeks after Andy Watts joined, the band played secret warm-up gigs in Buckley, Greenock and Lancaster, before heading to North Hollywood to record with David Bowie and T. Rex producer Tony Visconti. The band released their debut single "Love Is the Law" on 28 April 1997 via Geffen Records, to whom Squire was still signed following his departure from the Stone Roses. The band's debut album, Do It Yourself, was released in May 1997. One of the songs on the album, "Love Me and Leave Me", was co-written with Liam Gallagher of Oasis, with whom the band toured in 1997.

Shortly before the release of the single "Love Me and Leave Me", it was announced that drummer Andy Watts was leaving the group to spend more time with his family. Watts later claimed that he was actually asked to leave by the band's manager Steve Atherton at a meeting with the band's accountants, on behalf of the band, because they did not approve of the drummer's excessive behaviour on tour, and felt he did not fit in with the desired image for the band. Commenting on the reason for Watts's departure, Helme stated that he had been "playing like an arse"; Watts later put that down to his cocaine usage. Fletcher later revealed that Watts had "gone off the rails". Watts was temporarily replaced by session players Mal Scott (who toured with the band throughout 1997 and played on the standalone Squire/Helme co-written single "You Can Talk to Me" in December 1997) and Toby Drummond.

The band went on to play support slots with the Rolling Stones, U2, and Oasis. In 1998, the band began work on a follow-up album with another new drummer, Mark Heaney. They previewed several new songs during secret fan club gigs and festival appearances, including "City in the Sky", "700 Horses", "Tombraid" and two Helme compositions "Won't Let You Fall" and "Moth".

== Second album recording sessions and split ==
The band entered Olympic Studios with producer David Bottrill in January 1999 to record the album, with the working titles of Minus Blue and Motorcade, and tensions came to a head between Squire and Helme. Fletcher later revealed that he witnessed Helme "turn a Larrivée guitar into match sticks during that session". Squire walked out of the studio and did not return; the sessions were abandoned, and the group split up.

The band's split was officially announced on 23 January 1999, with a press release citing musical differences. A spokesman for the band later informed the NME that Squire had "become increasingly dissatisfied with the material being produced by Helme until it reached a point where their partnership was no longer possible".

Despite having previewed fully formed songs including two of his own compositions, Helme would later claim in 2001 that his contributions were being ignored and that the songs the band were working on were "unfinished tunes with unfinished lyrics, and they're all John's songs". Squire had previously commented that "I'd say the ratio of songwriting is the same as before; Chris and I help each other out with songs, but we haven't done that many strict collaborations", and sources close to the band confirmed that the band had worked on a number of his songs that were set to appear on the album.

Helme admitted in 2011 that he had been unhappy with Squire writing the majority of the band's material and, therefore, picking up the majority of the band's publishing money. Due to this, he attempted to launch a solo career whilst still in the Seahorses, and claimed that the Seahorses' management informed him that they would sue him if he started touring playing his own material whilst still a member of the band. This led to trust issues between Helme and Squire, and Helme began drinking heavily and turning up for rehearsals "hung over and stinking" to the increasing irritation of Squire.

Squire later commented on his reasons for ending the band that "I thought 'This sounds shit, we don't deserve to be in this place.' The band sounded complacent. I don't suppose it was anyone's fault. Maybe it got far too much attention for very little effort in the early stages, because of what I'd done in the past." He also added that the "band wasn't working out cos the singer, Chris, wanted to pursue a solo career in tandem, there was no way that that was going to work for me".

== Post-breakup ==
Following the demise of the Seahorses, Squire continued work with drummer Mark Heaney on a new project called John Squire's Skunkworks which also featured vocalist Duncan Baxter plus ex-Verve members Simon Jones and Simon Tong. However, the project collapsed and the other band members continued and released material as the Shining. Squire later released two solo albums and toured both, before announcing he was quitting music to concentrate on his art. In 2011 he recanted and rejoined the Stone Roses. In 2024, he went on tour with Liam Gallagher; the two had previously co-written a song for the Seahorses.

Following the split of the Shining, Heaney carried on working as a drum teacher and session musician, appearing on Squire's 2002 debut solo album Time Changes Everything. He joined post-punk icons Gang of Four in 2005, and continued working as a session drummer for artists such as Badly Drawn Boy, Klaxons, and many others.

Helme pursued a solo career and went on to attack John Squire in the press, describing his material as "muso wank". He then formed the Yards with Stuart Fletcher and former Shed Seven guitarist Paul Banks in 2001, who released two albums on their own Industrial Erotica label before splitting in November 2009. He has since resurrected his solo career with the self-released album Ashes. He later commented on his relationship with Squire that "I don't have any contact with him now, I didn't really when I was in the band – he was quite elusive."

Fletcher is still active in the local York music scene. He regularly performs in covers band the Mothers, and also played with Rick Witter in his short-lived post-Shed Seven band Rick Witter & The Dukes. He joined Heather Findlay's band, Mantra Vega, in 2015, and joined to Hurricane #1 in 2018.

The band's first drummer, Andy Watts, went on to front the short-lived Mozer, who split prior to releasing anything. In 2004 he began performing sporadic solo acoustic shows around London. Since then, he has worked with Stuart A. Staples of Tindersticks and Roger Goslyn. Watts was also commissioned to write for a BBC radio documentary celebrating 30 years of the song "Bohemian Rhapsody". Rhapsody in Bohemia won Best Documentary: Directors' Choice Award in the 2006 Third Coast awards. He released a solo EP, Fragments of Bone, on his own imprint, Meraki Records, in 2014. In 2016, he and his partner released their debut children's book Cloud Cuckoo Land under the moniker 'Wavey n Snotts', leading to a tour of Waterstones book stores and invites to several literary and music festivals.

== Discography ==
Albums

- Do It Yourself (26 May 1997) – UK No. 2,

Singles

- "Love Is the Law" (28 April 1997) – UK No. 3
- "Blinded by the Sun" (14 July 1997) – UK No. 7
- "Love Me and Leave Me" (29 September 1997) – UK No. 16
- "You Can Talk to Me" (1 December 1997) – UK No. 15, US Modern Rock No. 30
