= Love Is the Law =

Love Is the Law may refer to:

== Albums ==
- Love Is the Law, a 1969 album by Graham Bond, or its title track
- Love Is the Law (Toyah album), or its title track, 1983
- Love Is the Law (Suburbs album), or its title track, 1984
- Love Is the Law (Mentallo & The Fixer album), or its title track, 2000
- Love Is the Law (Charlene Soraia album), or its title track, 2014

== Songs ==
- "Love Is the Law", a 1970 song by Sons of the Vegetal Mother
- "Love Is the Law", a 1985 song by Thompson Twins
- "Love Is the Law", a 1995 song by The Electric Hellfire Club
- "Love Is the Law" (The Seahorses song), 1997
- "Love Is the Law", a 2001 single by Paul Kelly
- "Love Is the Law", a 2009 song by Tata Young

== See also ==
- "If Love Is the Law", a song by Noel Gallagher's High Flying Birds
