= She Left Me on Friday =

Single by Shed Seven

from the album Let It Ride
- B-side: "Bottom Upwards"
- Released: 2 March 1998
- Recorded: 1998
- Genre: Rock
- Length: 3:31
- Label: Polydor Records
- Songwriter: Witter/Banks
- Producer: Stephen Street

Shed Seven singles chronology
"Chasing Rainbows" (1996)	"She Left Me on Friday" (1998)	"The Heroes" (1998)

"She Left Me on Friday" is the second single taken from the Shed Seven album Let It Ride. It was released on 2 March 1998 and entered the UK Singles Chart, peaking at number 11 and remaining in top 100 on the list for 6 weeks.

The song also appears on the band's compilation albums Going For Gold and The Singles Collection, along with the live albums Where Have You Been Tonight? and Live At The BBC.

== Track listing ==
=== 7" vinyl ===
1. She Left Me On Friday (3:31)
2. Bottom Upwards (4:28)

=== CD1 ===
1. She Left Me On Friday (3:31)
2. Bottom Upwards (4:28)
3. Melpomene (3:20)

=== CD2 ===
1. She Left Me On Friday (3:31)
2. My Misspent Youth (3:32)
3. You (4:58)
