= Chris Helme =

English singer and songwriter (born 1971)

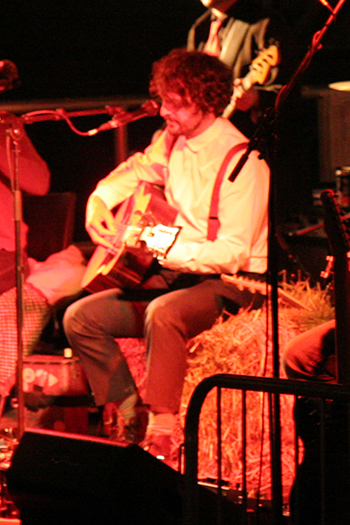
- Chris Helme performing at the Galtres Parklands Festival in August 2014

Background information
- Born: Christopher Alan Helme; 22 July 1971 (age 55); Howden, Yorkshire, England
- Origin: Osbaldwick, York, England
- Genres: Folk; alternative rock; Britpop
- Occupations: Singer; songwriter
- Instruments: Vocals; guitar
- Years active: 1990–present
- Formerly of: Daisy Space/Genuine Moon Material; Chutzpah; the Seahorses; the Yards
- Website: www.chrishelme.co.uk

Christopher Alan Helme (born 22 July 1971) is an English singer and songwriter. He was the lead singer of the rock band the Seahorses from their formation in 1996. Formed by guitarist John Squire after his departure from the Stone Roses, they split after musical differences during recording sessions in January 1999 for a planned follow-up from their only album, Do It Yourself (1997). Following this, Helme formed the Yards with former Seahorses bassist Stuart Fletcher before embarking on a solo career.

== History ==
=== Early days (1990–1996) ===
Helme began singing and performing at the age of 19, and began playing in local pubs and folk clubs in his native York with his first band Daisy Space/Genuine Moon Material before forming folk-jazz band Chutzpah in 1993. The band regularly gigged at the White Swan Pub in Goodramgate and the Fibbers venue, both within York, where Helme worked behind the bar. In 1995 the band busked across rural France before splitting up. In 2007, they reformed for a one-off gig at the White Swan.

=== The Seahorses (1996–1999) ===
A friend of John Squire's long-time guitar technician Martin Herbet discovered Helme busking outside Woolworths department store in York's Coney Street. Impressed by Helme's version of the Rolling Stones 1968 single, "No Expectations", he requested a demo tape and passed it on to Squire. Squire went to see Helme perform at Fibbers on 26 May and 16 June 1996. Another gig was then arranged at the Manchester Roadhouse, where Squire invited Helme to join his new band, for which he had already recruited bassist Stuart Fletcher.

Geffen Records, to whom Squire was still under contract following his departure from the Stone Roses, signed the band. The Seahorses released their only album Do It Yourself on 26 May 1997. The album was produced by Tony Visconti and spawned three hit singles. "Love is the Law" reached number two on the UK Singles Chart; "Blinded by the Sun" got to number seven and "Love Me and Leave Me" at number fifteen. The stand-alone single "You Can Talk to Me", co-written by Squire and Helme also peaked at number fifteen.

In January 1999, after two years of intensive touring, including support slots to the Rolling Stones, U2 and Oasis, a press release sent to the NME announced the split of the Seahorses "due to John Squire's and lead singer Chris Helme's irreconcilable differences over the musical direction the band should take".

Both Helme and Squire later gave conflicting reasons for the split. Helme claimed that "there was a personality clash during rehearsals. When he (Squire) came up with new stuff I didn't like his lyrics or tunes. I could have gone with it and made quite a lot of money, but I wasn't interested." Squire later commented on his reasons for ending the band that "I thought, 'This sounds shit, we don't deserve to be in this place.' The band sounded complacent. I don't suppose it was anyone's fault. Maybe it got far too much attention for very little effort in the early stages, because of what I'd done in the past."

=== Solo and the Yards (1999–2009) ===
Following the Seahorses' early demise, Helme undertook a short solo tour across England which culminated with a gig at the London Improv Theatre. Backed by a newly formed band featuring members of York band, 'the Lo Beams', Fraser Smith of Shed Seven and fellow ex-Seahorse, Stuart Fletcher performing material written whilst in the Seahorses. The gigs were confirmed just eleven days following the official announcement of the Seahorses' split.

Following these initial gigs, which the NME described as "fairly unambitious rock music", Helme abandoned the band format and returned to his native York where he performed sporadic low-key solo acoustic shows. In 2000 Helme started working with session guitarist James Nisbet and began playing showcase gigs in London backed by a revolving cast of session musicians, which at one point featured drummer Toby Drummond, who temporarily replaced Andy Watts in the Seahorses. With a full band, Helme headlined his biggest gig to date as a solo artist, at the Theatre Royal in York in May 2000.

In 2001 a permanent backing band was assembled with Nisbet, drummer John Miller and Stuart Fletcher back on bass. With new management and PR, an official website was launched and a 3 track demo CD was serviced to the media. With the new band, Helme performed numerous London showcase gigs at the Ritz Hotel and undertook a short UK tour in November of that year.

Helme then went on to form the Yards with members of his solo backing band. Initially named Super Zero, the band originally featured former Shed Seven guitarist Paul Banks who left before the release of their debut EP The Devil Is Alive and Well in D.C. in April 2003. The band released their self-titled debut album in 2005 and second album Imperial Measures in 2009 via their own label Industrial Erotica. The band split in November 2009 with members pursuing their own projects.

=== Solo (2009 – present) ===
Helme set up an independent record label, promo company and booking agency "Little Num Num Music" with fellow York musician Andy Gaines. It was on this label that Helme released his debut solo album, Ashes, in May 2008. He toured the UK extensively to coincide with the release and followed up with a single, Pleased, in 2010 which was taken from his second album. In August 2012 Helme released second album The Rookery to positive reviews. Recorded in 11 days, the album was produced by Helme with Sam Forrest of Nine Black Alps. Helme continued to tour as a solo artist and with a full band. On 26 May 2022, Chris played an acoustic solo performance of Do It Yourself in its entirety at Bridlington Spa in East Yorkshire. The gig was played 25 years to the day since the original album release date of 26 May 1997.

In 2021, Helme, Nigel Clarke of Dodgy and Mark Morriss of the Bluetones formed a supergroup together named MCH, their combined surname initials. They toured in July 2021 and played at The Bowdon Rooms in Altrincham to show new material they had written. They initially planned to tour and create an album with Shed Seven, although the group was short-lived, coinciding with the abuse allegations claimed against Morriss.

In 2024, a decade after his last release, Helme released his third solo album World Of My Own. The folk-rock album is a reflection on the decade prior, described as 'celebrating and questioning relationships, the distance and closeness that inhabit them and the events that pull [people] tighter together' by RGM.

== Solo discography ==
Albums

- 2008 – Ashes
- 2012 – The Rookery
- 2024 – World of My Own

Singles

- 2010 – "Pleased"
