= Do It Yourself (The Seahorses album) =

Studio album by The Seahorses
- Released: 26 May 1997
- Recorded: Autumn 1996
- Studios: Royaltone Studios, North Hollywood, California
- Genres: Alternative rock, indie rock, Britpop
- Length: 45:35
- Label: Geffen
- Producer: Tony Visconti

Singles from Do It Yourself
- 1. "Love Is the Law" Released: 28 April 1997; 2. "Blinded by the Sun" Released: 14 July 1997; 3. "Love Me and Leave Me" Released: 29 September 1997

Professional ratings
Review scores
Source	Rating
AllMusic	3/5 stars
The List	3/5 stars
Los Angeles Times	2.5/4 stars
NME	5/10
Pitchfork	6.7/10
Rolling Stone	3/5 stars
Uncut	3/5 stars

Do It Yourself is the only album by the Seahorses, an English alternative rock band from York that was formed by former Stone Roses guitarist John Squire. The album's cover features a photograph of Squire's 1996 sculpture in the shape of globe made of puzzle pieces and was named Do It Yourself.

The album was released to mixed-to-positive reviews, but was well received by the British public. It entered the UK Albums Chart at #2, behind Gary Barlow's solo debut Open Road, and went on to gain platinum status after selling over 300,000 copies in the UK alone. The album featured three charting UK singles: "Love Is the Law" (No. 3), "Blinded by the Sun" (No. 7), and "Love Me and Leave Me" (No. 16), the latter of which was lead singer of Oasis Liam Gallagher's first songwriting credit. NME readers voted the Seahorses the fourth best new act of 1997; Guitarist magazine readers voted Do It Yourself the tenth-best album of the year.

A short UK tour in December 1997, with support from American alternative rock band Third Eye Blind, promoted the album's release, as did subsequent support slots with the Rolling Stones, U2 and Oasis. Ongoing recording sessions, which yielded the 1997 single "You Can Talk to Me" (UK #15, US Modern Rock Tracks #30), were aborted in January 1999, and the band split soon after, without completing the planned follow-up to Do It Yourself.

== Track listing ==
All songs are composed by John Squire except where noted.

No.	Title	Writer(s)	Length
1.	"I Want You to Know"	Chris Helme, Stuart Fletcher	4:52
2.	"Blinded by the Sun"	Helme	4:39
3.	"Suicide Drive"		3:31
4.	"Boy in the Picture"		2:54
5.	"Love is the Law"		7:43
6.	"Happiness is Egg-Shaped"		3:45
7.	"Love Me and Leave Me"	John Squire, Liam Gallagher	3:55
8.	"Round the Universe"		3:45
9.	"1999"		3:25
10.	"Standing on Your Head"		4:39
11.	"Hello"	Helme	2:22
Total length:			45:35

== Personnel ==
The Seahorses

- Chris Helme - vocals, acoustic guitar, backing vocals
- John Squire - guitar, artwork
- Stuart Fletcher - bass guitar
- Andy Watts - drums, backing vocals

with:

- Lili Haydn - violin

Technical

- Tony Visconti - production, arrangements, conductor, mellotron, tambura, theremin
- Jeff Thomas - engineer
- Rob Jacobs - recording, mixing
- Bob Ludwig - mastering
- Simon Moran - management
- Steve Atherton - management
- Francesca Restrepo - art direction

== Charts ==
=== Weekly charts ===
Chart (1997)	Peak position
Australian Albums (ARIA)	97
New Zealand Albums (RMNZ)	38
Scottish Albums (Official Charts)	1
Swedish Albums (Sverigetopplistan)	35
UK Albums (Official Charts)	2

=== Year-end charts ===
Chart (1997)	Position
UK Albums (OCC)	32

=== Singles ===
Single	Chart (1997)	Peak position
"Love Is the Law"	Canada Rock/Alternative (RPM)	3
"Love Is the Law"	Ireland (IRMA)	11
"Love Is the Law"	Scottish Singles Sales (Official Charts)	1
"Love Is the Law"	Sweden (Sverigetopplistan)	38
"Love Is the Law"	UK Singles (Official Charts)	3
"Blinded by the Sun"	Scottish Singles Sales (Official Charts)	4
"Blinded by the Sun"	UK Singles (Official Charts)	7
"Love Me and Leave Me"	Scottish Singles Sales (Official Charts)	6
"Love Me and Leave Me"	UK Singles (Official Charts)	16
