= Let It Ride (Shed Seven album) =

Studio album by Shed Seven
- Released: 1 June 1998
- Recorded: 1996–1998
- Studio: Olympic, London; Ric Rac Sound, Leeds; RAK, London
- Genre: Rock, alternative rock
- Length: 50:39
- Label: Polydor
- Producer: Stephen Street, Chris Sheldon, Dave Leaper

Shed Seven chronology
A Maximum High (1996)	Let It Ride (1998)	Going for Gold (1999)

Singles from Let It Ride
- 1. "Chasing Rainbows" Released: 11 November 1996; 2. "She Left Me on Friday" Released: 2 March 1998; 3. "The Heroes" Released: 11 May 1998; 4. "Devil in Your Shoes (Walking All Over)" Released: 10 August 1998

Let It Ride is the third studio album by the British rock band Shed Seven, released in June 1998 via Polydor Records, and was the band's first LP to be written solely by Rick Witter (lyrics) and Paul Banks (music).

The album features Clint Boon of the Oldham-based band, Inspiral Carpets, on keyboards, and Heather "Lady Galadril" Findlay, of the fellow York-based band, Mostly Autumn, on vocals.

== Reception ==
Professional ratings
Review scores
Source	Rating
AllMusic	3/5 stars
NME	(6/10)
The Guardian	3/5 stars

Let It Ride garnered a mixed reception upon release. At the time the Shed's were deemed to be taking on a 'new', punchier sound following first hearings of their comeback single, "She Left Me on Friday", with various reviewers drawing comparisons to both Black Grape and Blur. The NME, who labelled the song "the most fiendishly clever Blur parody ever", went on to liken the album's sound to that of both The Rolling Stones and The Stone Roses in their indifferent review;

Wombling somewhere between The Rolling Stones and The Stone Roses (check the title track and 'In A Hole' [sic]) you get the sneaking feeling that the band members themselves are still more entertaining than the music they make, but face up to it, kiddoes, any group who can sell 250,000 copies of 'A Maximum High' whilst retaining all the credibility and sophistication of a Millets cagoule must have something going for them.

Writing for The Guardian in June 1998, Caroline Sullivan saw Let It Ride as an improvement on the band's previous album, saying "it aspires to bigger things, and almost gets there [whilst] singer Rick Witter has even acquired a raspiness that complements the beefy music".

== Chart performance ==
=== Album ===
Let It Ride spent a total of seven weeks in the UK album chart, peaking at number 9 on 13 June 1998, giving the band their second consecutive Top 10 album release.

=== Singles ===
It spawned four UK hit singles for the band with "Chasing Rainbows", "She Left Me on Friday", "The Heroes" and "Devil in Your Shoes (Walking All Over)" all placing in the Top 40 of the Singles Chart. "She Left Me on Friday" was the most successful of the four, peaking at number 11 on 14 March 1998.

== Track listing ==
All tracks written by Witter/Paul Banks.

=== UK version ===
No.	Title	Length
1.	"Return"	6:27
2.	"Let It Ride"	5:00
3.	"The Heroes"	5:43
4.	"Halfway Home"	3:40
5.	"Devil in Your Shoes"	5:27
6.	"She Left Me on Friday"	3:32
7.	"A Hole"	4:10
8.	"Drink Your Love"	5:03
9.	"Stand Up and Be Counted"	4:52
10.	"Chasing Rainbows"	4:25
11.	"Goodbye"	2:14

Track 10 is an alternate mix to the single version originally released in 1996, reworked by Stephen Street.

=== Other versions ===
Japanese Edition
No.	Title	Length
1.	"Return"	6:27
2.	"Let It Ride"	5:00
3.	"The Heroes"	5:43
4.	"Halfway Home"	3:40
5.	"Devil in Your Shoes"	5:27
6.	"Slinky Love Theme"	4:27
7.	"She Left Me on Friday"	3:32
8.	"A Hole"	4:10
9.	"Drink Your Love"	5:03
10.	"Happy Now"	5:12
11.	"Stand Up and Be Counted"	4:52
12.	"Chasing Rainbows"	4:25
13.	"Goodbye"	2:14

The Japanese album release, along with a unique album cover, featured a different running order with two additional bonus tracks, "Slinky Love Theme" and "Happy Now", which were to be found as b-sides on the UK single releases of "The Heroes" and "Devil in Your Shoes (Walking All Over)", respectively.

2014 Edition Bonus CD
No.	Title	Length
1.	"The Skin I'm In" (B-side to Chasing Rainbows)
2.	"In Command" (B-side to Chasing Rainbows)
3.	"You" (B-side to She Left Me On Friday)
4.	"My Misspent Youth" (B-side to She Left Me On Friday)
5.	"Slinky Love Theme" (B-side to The Heroes)
6.	"She Left Me On Friday" (demo version)
7.	"Disco Down" (live on Top of the Pops 1999)
8.	"Chasing Rainbows" (demo version)
9.	"Devil In Your Shoes" (demo version)
10.	"Better Late Than Never" (demo version)
11.	"She Left Me On Friday" (Adrian Sherwood dub remix, B-side to The Heroes)
12.	"The Heroes" (Parr Street session version 1999)
13.	"Chasing Rainbows" (A Maximum High, 15th Anniversary EP version 2011)

2014 Edition released 4 August 2014

2025 Edition Bonus LP
No.	Title	Length
1.	"In Command" (B-side to Chasing Rainbows)
2.	"The Skin I'm In" (B-side to Chasing Rainbows)
3.	"Bottom Upwards" (B-side to She Left Me On Friday)
4.	"Melpomene" (B-side to She Left Me On Friday)
5.	"My Misspent Youth" (B-side to She Left Me On Friday)
6.	"You" (B-side to She Left Me On Friday)
7.	"Slinky Love Theme" (B-side to The Heroes)
8.	"Forever Isn't Such A Long Time" (B-side to The Heroes)
9.	"Happy Now" (B-side to Devil In Your Shoes)
10.	"This Is A New Day" (B-side to Devil In Your Shoes)
11.	"Dumb Scene" (B-side to Devil In Your Shoes)
12.	"Better Late Than Never" (B-side to Devil In Your Shoes)

2025 Edition released 24 October 2025

== Personnel ==
=== Shed Seven ===
- Rick Witter – lead vocals
- Paul Banks – guitars, keyboards, harmonica
- Tom Gladwin – bass
- Alan Leach – drums, percussion

=== Additional musicians ===
- Clint Boon – keyboards
- Heather Findlay – backing vocals
- The Kick Horns – brass
