= Rick Witter & The Dukes =

Rick Witter & the Dukes
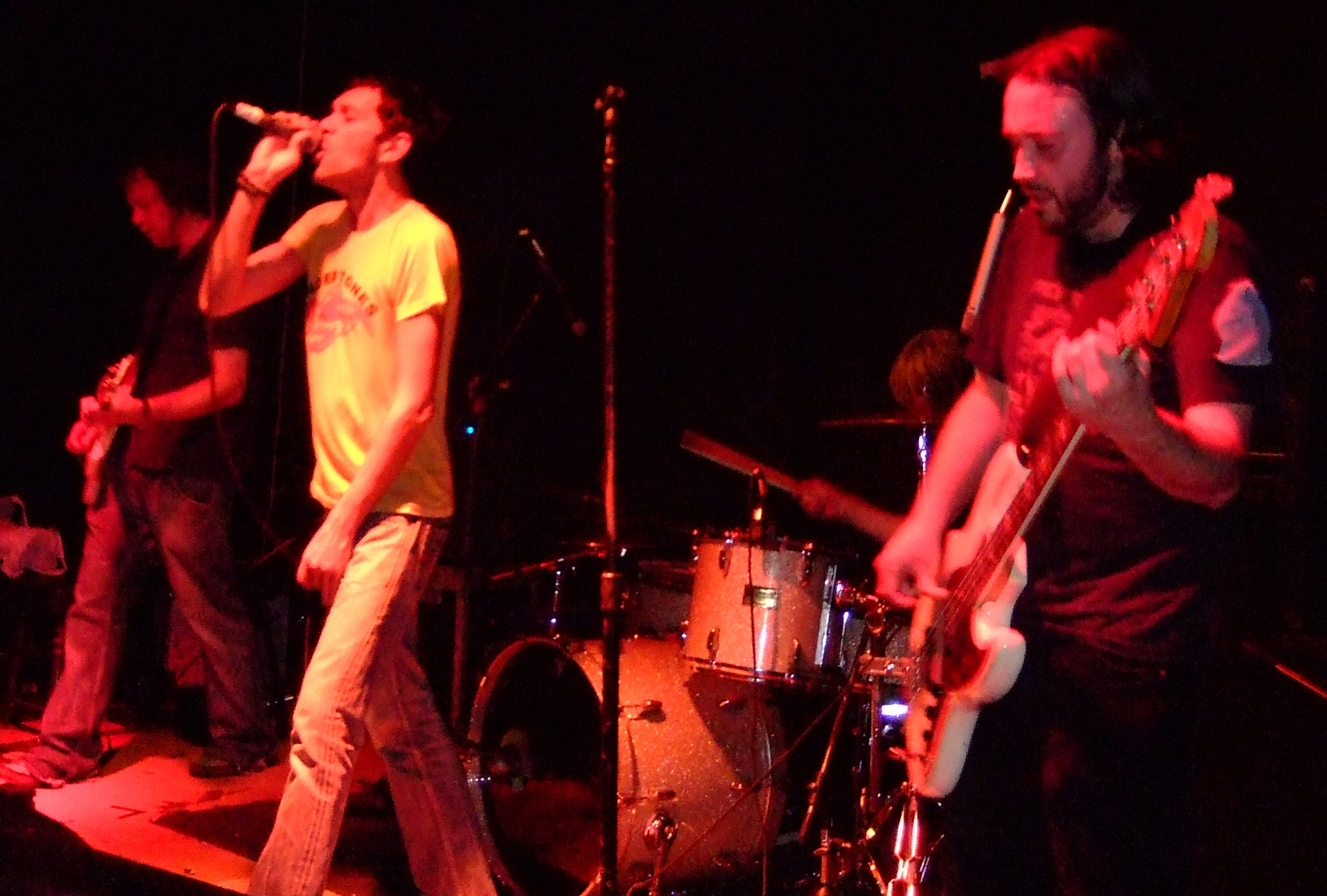
- Rick & the Dukes at Dundee Doghouse 2007

Background information
- Origin: York, England
- Genres: Alternative rock, Indie
- Years active: 2005–2008
- Label: Hookline And Singer
- Past members: Rick Witter; Rob Wilson; Stuart Fletcher; Matt Lunn

Rick Witter & the Dukes were an English alternative rock band from York, formed in 2005 by ex-Shed Seven frontman Rick Witter and also featured ex-Seahorses bassist Stuart Fletcher.

== History ==
In August 2005, former Shed Seven front man, Rick Witter, announced details of his new band, Rick Witter & The Dukes, along with a week of low key concerts in Scotland. The initial plan for The Dukes was to mix playing brand new material together with a few old Shed Seven songs in an effort not to alienate Witter's existing fanbase from the days with his former band. His new outfit maintained the guitar rock stylings of his predecessor, but added a harder, rockier edge.

Two sold out shows at Fibbers in York, followed the handful of Scottish dates in December of the same year. The same month also saw the first airing of Dukes material online, as four song excerpts began streaming on a newly created Rick Witter & the Dukes MySpace page (which was later to become the band's official website). The four short demos included the tracks; "He Was the Boy Who Waited So Long He Forgot What He Was Waiting For", "Pull Together", "The Devil Will Be Waiting For You" and "The Other Way Around".

By April 2006, the Dukes had announced a full 18-date UK tour, as well as making a further demo available to download for free, titled "The Sky Falls Down". In July 2006, the band began recording sessions for their self-financed debut album in Leeds with record producer, Will Jackson, initially slated for release in late 2006. In August of the same year, the band went on to headline the Beached Festival in Scarborough, whilst their debut album The Year of the Rat was finally released in April 2007 via Hookline and Singer/Notting Hill Music. Five of the album's tracks feature fellow York musicians, Chris Helme and John Hargreaves of the Yards, on backing vocals and piano, whilst one track features the additional vocals of the Leeds-based jazz musician, Kate Peters. The LP itself is dedicated to the memory of Roger Witter, Rick's father.

Initial copies of the album came in the form of a special limited edition, presented in an embossed metal tin with card slip case and fold out lyric poster, and limited to 1,000 units. To celebrate the album's release, the band announced a special one-off gig aboard a boat on York's River Ouse, known as the Ouse Cruise, as the band played a set consisting entirely of their own material to 70 fans.

== Band members ==
- Rick Witter (Vocals)
- Rob Wilson (Guitars)
- Stuart Fletcher (Bass)
- Matt Lunn (Drums)

== Discography ==
=== Albums ===
- The Year of The Rat (2007)
