= Change Giver =

Studio album by Shed Seven
- Released: 5 September 1994
- Recorded: Late 1993–early 1994
- Studio: Greenhouse (Old Street, London)
- Genre: Rock, Britpop
- Length: 46:09
- Label: Polydor
- Producer: Jessica Corcoran

Shed Seven chronology
Change Giver (1994)	A Maximum High (1996)

Singles from Change Giver
- 1. "Mark" / "Casino Girl" Released: 7 March 1994; 2. "Dolphin" Released: 13 June 1994; 3. "Speakeasy" Released: 15 August 1994; 4. "Ocean Pie" Released: 31 October 1994

Change Giver is the debut album by British rock band Shed Seven, released via Polydor Records on 5 September 1994. It was produced by Jessica Corcoran and was issued during the formative year of the Britpop movement—a scene that dominated British alternative music in the mid-1990s.

The album was a moderate chart success in the UK, peaking at number 16 in the UK Albums Chart upon release, while three of the four singles taken from the album charted in the UK Top 40.

== Background ==
=== Unsigned ===
Formed in 1990, Shed Seven quickly gained a reputation for their live performances, having been banned from playing in a number of local music venues in their hometown of York, due to the "violent" nature of attendees at their gigs. They soon focused their attention on London, playing a handful of live shows in the city's smaller venues—including both the Rock Garden and Bull and Gate—to audiences featuring key members of the British music business, such as BBC Radio 1 DJ Steve Lamacq. In September 1993, they were voted the third best live band at London's Inner City Festival—the first time an unsigned act had placed in the top three—and appeared on BBC Radio 5's Hit The North programme. In the same month they also performed at Manchester's In the City music festival, where they were awarded third place in the convention's Best Unsigned Band contest. Their performance at the festival generated some national exposure, gaining them one of what would become a number of complimentary live reviews in the NME, with the magazine simply stating: "They are brilliant."

=== Scene associations ===
"We've had shit for signing to Polydor when everyone else does the same but on fake indies like Hi-Rise or whatever. We chose to put Polydor on the middle of our records – like The Who and The Jam, two of the best British bands ever. That's what we aspire to, not to some crap indie credibility."

— Paul Banks, October, 1994

Following the positive response to the band's In the City showcase performance, Shed Seven found themselves amid a record label bidding war, and eventually opted to sign a six-album major label deal with Polydor Records in October 1993. A support slot for the Inspiral Carpets soon followed, along with joint headline gigs with bands such as Compulsion and Elastica, as they were labelled "thrashy punk newcomers" and were associated with the short-lived New Wave of New Wave scene. Yet, by the time Change Giver was released five months later, they were seen in the British music press as being part of a vibrant, new movement in British music, spearheaded by acts like Suede, a band who had personally invited Shed Seven to open their gig at Blackpool's Tower Ballroom on 11 February 1994. Writing for The Guardian a month after the release of Change Giver, Caroline Sullivan summarised Shed Seven's role in the emergent scene, which was initially dubbed "lad-rock" and would later come to be known as britpop; "With Oasis achieving a number one album and Shed Seven being praised everywhere, the good old unambiguous British guitar band could be making a comeback. Like Oasis, this York band are defiantly heterosexual, and brimming with what in a previous day would have been called arrogance, and is now known as 'attitude'."

=== Praise and criticism ===
Shed Seven enjoyed a copious amount of praise for their music in the run up to the release of Change Giver. In March 1994, NME claimed that they were "worthy carriers of the baton that's passed through the hands of the Buzzcocks, The Smiths and The Stone Roses", and The Guardian named them "this week's Next Big Things" in late-October, highlighting the group as an alternative to the "musical thuggery" of other bands. Melody Maker, many of whose writers had championed the band's cause from an early stage, declared them one of "the UK's brightest hopes", whilst The Independent claimed that they were "perhaps the spunkiest new British band". Along with further positive reviews of their live shows, much of the press attention received by the band drew musical comparisons with The Smiths, a band who both Witter and Banks cited as making a "big influence" on them in their youth.

Although they were seen to be musically relevant, Shed Seven were not beyond reproach as they were also met with a certain amount of discord in the British music press. Alongside the praise heaped on their live performances, came a wave of non-musical criticism aimed at the "foolish" things they said, their haircuts and unfashionable dress sense, through to their band and singer's names. In a piece titled "Pretenders to the throne", charting British rock music's challengers to the crown then-held by Blur, The Guardian posed the question: "do they really expect to make it big with a singer called Rick Witter?". By the time the record was finally issued in the UK in early September, both critical and public opinion on the band was somewhat divisive. As noted in Change Giver's Melody Maker review; "Everybody has an opinion on Shed Seven (...) It's love 'em or hate 'em time!".

=== Feud with Oasis ===
"Change Giver is already receiving innumerable comparisons with Oasis' Definitely Maybe, with the band being tagged, rather patronisingly, as some sort of 'Oasis Jr.' The comparisons have done little to stop what is fast becoming a feud between the bands, culminating in Noel Gallagher's recent boast in MM that, 'If we're The Beatles, where are The Rolling Stones... it's not f***ing Shed Seven'."

— Dave Simpson writing for Melody Maker, September 1994

As the release of Change Giver grew nearer, animosity between Oasis and Shed Seven emerged. The two bands—who had played on the same bill in London and were touring France together as part of a small series of shows organised by a French magazine—were seen as contemporaneous rivals and had become embroiled in a war of words via sections of the British music press. The feud was heightened by a comment from Noel Gallagher in an August 1994 issue of Melody Maker magazine. Due to this growing rivalry, along with the positive response that had greeted the release of their debut double A side single "Mark" / "Casino Girl", the fledgling band were seen to have set themselves a high standard to live up to. Although Change Giver did receive some positive attention, featuring in a number of music publications end-of-year polls, it failed to gain the same scale of universal critical approval as that of Definitely Maybe, and was unable to match the unit sales of the then-record breaking debut album.

== Recording ==
Having signed a record deal with Polydor in late 1993, just six weeks later the band members had left their regular jobs and headed to London's Greenhouse Studio to begin recording sessions for their debut release. Commenting on these early sessions in July 1999, guitarist Paul Banks revealed that they were slightly overwhelmed by their first experience of recording in a professional studio;

We'd been signed in October 1993 and it was all a bit of a shock really. We were in a studio called the Greenhouse in London, just recording for the first time. We didn't really have a clue, we were a bit mesmerised. Looking back at it now, we were quite young and naive.

The first song completed during the initial sessions in late 1993 was the band's debut single "Mark", with what would be the follow-up single, "Dolphin", recorded in early 1994. "Dolphin" was the earliest song written by the band to be included on the album and, when issued as a single in June 1994, it would be the only single release from Change Giver that Banks was not involved in writing. Although the band's third single, "Speakeasy", went on to become their highest-charting release from the album, it was initially composed with the intention for it to be included as a b-side on a future single release. The song was written in-studio towards the end of the album sessions over the course of a day, and recorded the day after. Noting the group's decision to record the track so quickly after it was written, Banks explained that this was done "just to get it down straight away without thinking about whether it was good or not".

== Critical reception ==
Professional ratings
Review scores
Source	Rating
AllMusic	4/5 stars
Music Week	4/5
NME	7/10
Q	3/5 stars
Select	3/5 medals
Smash Hits	5/5
Volume	(Positive)
Vox	7/10

Change Giver received mixed to positive reviews upon release, with some critics finding it to be a respectable debut album for a young, upcoming band, but that it mainly served as an indication that the group were capable of bettering it in future releases. Angela Lewis, writing for The Independent in October 1994, described the group as "roguishly disarming youth popsters" who, despite having "a bravado whiff of ridiculous self assurance that's straight out of Blur's 1992 patent", had something worthwhile to offer with the release of their debut album. She went on to note the band's Britishness, and found similarities with the Smiths in their music: "At the heart of Shed Seven's appeal is their memorable way with a glucose-centred pop tune (many sweat at it but few can actually pull it off) in songs like 'Mark' and 'Dolphin'. Plus, there's the ghost of The Smiths in the Sheddoes chiming chords, putting in a friendly, but not too overwhelming, appearance." Ian Gittins of Melody Maker also noted a similarity with the Smiths, via a "tenuous link" found in the lyrics written by Shed Seven's frontman, Rick Witter, who he thought had "an ear for Morrissey-esque homely homilies". He described the album as "spasmodically exciting and uplifting", but found it to be too orthodox a record overall to be able to "term it a 'classic'". He also drew comparisons with both Radiohead and Oasis, and highlighted "Dirty Soul" and "Long Time Dead" as the album's standout tracks: "Viewed as a chipper, cocky collection of brassy northern pop songs, Change Giver scores a resounding... seven out of 10. 'Dirty Soul', the opener, is the kind of choppy, fuzzy rollercoaster ride Shed Seven are good at and 'Long Time Dead' is a supremely catchy angst fest à la 'Creep'".

Q's Martin Aston noted that Shed Seven had "enjoyed an arresting development to date", when reviewing Change Giver in October 1994. He remarked on the group's knack of "covering different bases" throughout the record, and surmised that they "neatly mirror the original mod tendency to expand in the direction of acid rock". Singling out "Dolphin" as one of the album's highlights, he labelled the song "a memorably chunky slice of Northern pop scruff", and went on to claim that "Speakeasy" was "even better". The latter track was also praised by Select's Roy Wilkinson, who stated that "the inclusion of a song as poutingly self-confident as 'Speakeasy' shows that Shed Seven can cut the mustard". He chose the deftness of "Ocean Pie" and the "I Am the Resurrection"-esque "On an Island with You" as other notable tracks, but found most of the songs on the record to have more in common with the sound of "Dolphin"—a track that he described as a "clanking half-tune". Deeming the album's shortcomings to be "no felony" when considering the band's youthful age, Wilkinson concluded that there was "enough here to show they could soon make a record to dwarf this one." Craig McLean of Vox thought that Change Giver managed to "transcend" the connotations with Oasis and the New Wave of New Wave scene that faced Shed Seven prior to the record's release. He compared "Dolphin" to the "tom-tom frothiness" of the Jack Rubies, noted a Byrds-like vocal interplay in "Speakeasy", and declared that the album "rides off into the sunset with the eight-minute riff-a-thon 'On an Island with You'." Music Week gave Change Giver a four out of five rating, and stated that it comprised "tight ensemble playing and a soul-tinged, mod-pop cool that is built to last."

=== Accolades ===
Publication	Country	Accolade	Year	Rank
Melody Maker	United Kingdom	Best 40 Albums of the Year	1994	38
NME	United Kingdom	Top 50 Albums of the Year	1994	29
Rocksound	France	Best 50 Albums of the Year	1994	46
Select	United Kingdom	Best 50 Albums of the Year	1994	48

== Promotion ==
=== Tours and festivals ===
Shed Seven undertook four UK tours throughout 1994 in support of the album and its singles, including a student-organised gig at St. Cuthbert's Roman Catholic School in Rochdale on 16 May. On 9 June, they played at the Heineken Music Festival at Avenham Park, Preston, along with Inspiral Carpets and Baby Chaos. They featured on the bill of 1994's Reading music festival on 27 August, performing a set on the Melody Maker Stage headlined by Madder Rose. In November 1994, they embarked on a seven-date tour of France, beginning in Lille at the Aeronef on 2 November and ending at the Festival Be Bop'n Roll in Le Mans on 10 November. The tour was part of a small series of shows organised by Les Inrockuptibles magazine, and featured a number of other British acts, including Echobelly and Gene. In February 1995, they returned to France to perform an eight-date tour with support from Dodgy, and the following Summer they appeared at some of the UK's largest music festivals, including Glastonbury, where they played on the NME Stage on 23 June, T in the Park on 6 August, and again at Reading, where they performed on the Main Stage on 26 August.

=== TV and radio ===
Following the release of the album's second single "Dolphin"—which sold 15,000 copies in its first week—the band made their debut appearance at Top of the Pops on 23 June 1994. On 27 September, they returned to BBC Radio where they had first featured as an unsigned band a year earlier, this time performing a full band four-song set as part of The Mark Radcliffe Show. On 23 June 1995, highlights of the band's performance at Glastonbury Festival, along with Sinéad O'Connor and Dodgy, were shown as part of Channel 4's coverage of the event.

== Aftermath ==
Following the release of Change Giver, Shed Seven spent much of 1995 out of the media spotlight. Between November 1994 and January 1996, they released just one single – "Where Have You Been Tonight?" in April 1995. By 1996, the band, and the album, were retrospectively seen to have lost out to Oasis in the race for britpop supremacy. Writing for The Guardian G2 in November 1996, Caroline Sullivan remarked, "a couple of years ago, when the outcome of the Britpop race was uncertain, the Sheds certainly gave the Gallaghers a run for their money. Noel was troubled enough to ask in late 1994, 'If we're the new Beatles, where are The Rolling Stones? It's not going to be fucking Shed Seven.' It indisputably wasn't Shed Seven." In a 1996 issue of Guitarist magazine, Paul Banks also conceded that although the two bands' careers had run parallel during the months running up to and following the release of their respective debut albums, when the Oasis "phenomenon" took off, ultimately, Shed Seven were unable to compete.

== Track listing ==
All tracks written by Rick Witter (words)/Shed Seven (music), unless otherwise noted.

No.	Title	Writer(s)	Length
1.	"Dirty Soul"	Shed Seven/Johnson	3:37
2.	"Speakeasy"		3:19
3.	"Long Time Dead"		3:50
4.	"Head and Hands"	Shed Seven/Johnson	3:58
5.	"Casino Girl"		3:56
6.	"Missing Out"	Shed Seven/Johnson	3:12
7.	"Dolphin"	Shed Seven/Johnson	3:36
8.	"Stars in Your Eyes"		4:06
9.	"Mark"		3:41
10.	"Ocean Pie"		4:39
11.	"On an Island with You"	Shed Seven/Johnson	8:13

- Tracks 5 and 9 are alternate versions to the single release issued in March 1994.

All tracks below written by Rick Witter/Tom Gladwin/Joe Johnson/Alan Leach unless otherwise stated

2014 Edition Bonus CD
No.	Title	Writer(s)	Length
1.	"Immobilise" (B-side to Dolphin)
2.	"Around Your House" (B-side to Speakeasy)
3.	"Sleep Easy" (B-side to Ocean Pie)	Rick Witter/Tom Gladwin/Alan Leach/Paul Banks
4.	"Sensitive" (B-side to Ocean Pie)
5.	"Your Guess Is As Good As Mine" (full band version 1999, B-side to Disco Down, incorrectly listed as B-side to Speakeasy)	Rick Witter/Paul Banks
6.	"Head and Hands" (BBC Radio 1 Session 1994)
7.	"Long Time Dead" (live at Brighton Zap 1994)	Rick Witter/Tom Gladwin/Alan Leach/Paul Banks
8.	"Dolphin" (demo version 1992)
9.	"Swing My Wave" (demo version 1992)
10.	"Immobilise" (demo version 1992)
11.	"Barracuda" (demo version 1991)
12.	"Kennel" (demo version 1991)
13.	"Missing Out" (Parr Street session version 1999)

2014 Edition released 4 August 2014

== Personnel ==
Shed Seven

- Rick Witter – vocals
- Paul Banks – guitar (except 2014 Edition bonus disc tracks 8–12)
- Tom Gladwin – bass
- Alan Leach – drums
- Joe Johnson – guitar (on 2014 Edition bonus disc tracks 8–12)

Technical personnel

- Jessica Corcoran – producer, mixer
- Jon Gray – engineer
- Shed Seven – engineer
- Steve Double – cover photography

== Chart performance ==
=== Album ===
Change Giver spent a total of two weeks in the UK Albums Chart in its release year, peaking at number 16 on 17 September 1994. The album re-entered the chart in 1998, this time peaking at number 124 and remaining there for a sole week.

Chart (1994)	Peak position
UK Albums Chart	16
Chart (1998)	Peak position
UK Albums Chart	124

=== Singles ===
Shed Seven's debut single, "Mark" / "Casino Girl", occupied the lower reaches of the UK Singles Chart, stalling at number 77 in March 1994. The following three releases—"Dolphin", "Speakeasy" and "Ocean Pie"—fared much better, beginning a run of fourteen consecutive UK Top 40 singles for the group. Each of the three songs entered the chart at number 33 or higher, with their then-biggest hit, "Speakeasy", reaching number 24 in August 1994.

Year	Title	Chart	Peak position
1994	"Mark" / "Casino Girl"	UK Singles Chart	77
1994	"Dolphin"	UK Singles Chart	28
1994	"Speakeasy"	UK Singles Chart	24
1994	"Ocean Pie"	UK Singles Chart	33

== Release history ==
Region	Date	Label	Format	Catalog No.
UK	5 September 1994	Polydor Records	LP; CD; MC	523615-1; 523615-2; 523615-4
Japan	26 October 1994	Polydor K.K.	CD	POCP-1455
US	29 August 1995	Polydor Records	Promo CD; CD	69712 4063 2 ADV; 124063
