= Getting Better (Shed Seven song) =

1996 single by Shed Seven

Single by Shed Seven

from the album A Maximum High
- B-side: "Only Dreaming"; "Song Seven"
- Released: 15 January 1996
- Length: 4:13
- Label: Polydor
- Songwriter: Shed Seven
- Producer: Chris Sheldon

Shed Seven singles chronology
"Where Have You Been Tonight?" (1995)	"Getting Better" (1996)	"Going For Gold" (1996)

"Getting Better" is the second single from the Shed Seven album A Maximum High. The song spent a total of three weeks on the UK Singles Chart, peaking at number 14 on 27 January 1996, while doing better in Scotland, reaching number 10.

== Track listings ==
7-inch vinyl and cassette

1. "Getting Better"
2. "Only Dreaming"

CD

1. "Getting Better"
2. "Only Dreaming"
3. "Song Seven"
