= Love Is the Law (song) =

1997 single by the Seahorses

Single by the Seahorses

from the album Do It Yourself
- B-side: "Dreamer"; "Sale of the Century"
- Released: 28 April 1997
- Studio: Royaltone (North Hollywood, California)
- Length: 7:43 (original version); 3:42 (single edit)
- Label: Geffen
- Songwriter: John Squire
- Producer: Tony Visconti

The Seahorses singles chronology
"Love Is the Law" (1997)	"Blinded by the Sun" (1997)

Music video
- "Love Is the Law" on YouTube

"Love Is the Law" is the debut single of Britpop band the Seahorses, released as the first single from their only studio album, Do It Yourself (1997). Written by ex-Stone Roses guitarist John Squire, the song contains a lengthy guitar solo at the end that was edited out for a single release. The cover artwork features a painting by Squire, also called Love Is the Law, that he created in 1996.

"Love Is the Law" is the Seahorses' biggest hit, debuting and peaking at number three on the UK Singles Chart in May 1997. The song also reached number 11 in Ireland and number 38 in Sweden. Outside Europe, "Love Is the Law" received airplay on North American radio, and its music video aired on MTV and VH1. This exposure allowed the song to reach number three on the Canadian RPM Alternative 30 chart.

== Track listings ==
UK, Japanese, and Australian CD single

1. "Love Is the Law" – 3:42
2. "Dreamer" – 3:31
3. "Sale of the Century" – 3:50

UK 7-inch single

A. "Love Is the Law" – 3:42
B. "Dreamer" – 3:31

== Credits and personnel ==
Credits are taken from the UK 7-inch single sleeve and the Do It Yourself album booklet.

Studios

- Recorded and mixed at Royaltone Studios (North Hollywood, California)
- Mastered at Gateway Mastering (Portland, Maine, US)

Personnel

- John Squire – writing, artwork painting (1996)
- Tony Visconti – production
- Rob Jacobs – recording, mixing
- Jeff Thomas – assistant engineer
- Bob Ludwig – mastering
- Matt Squire – photography

== Charts ==
=== Weekly charts ===
Chart (1997)	Peak position
Canada Rock/Alternative (RPM)	3
Europe (Eurochart Hot 100)	17
Ireland (IRMA)	11
Scottish Singles Sales (Official Charts)	1
Sweden (Sverigetopplistan)	38
UK Singles (Official Charts)	3

=== Year-end charts ===
Chart (1997)	Position
UK Singles (OCC)	91

== Release history ==
Region	Date	Format(s)	Label(s)	Ref.
United Kingdom	28 April 1997	7-inch vinyl; CD; cassette	Geffen	
Japan	21 May 1997	CD	Geffen	
United States	2 June 1997	Alternative radio	Geffen	
