= Stuart Fletcher (musician) =

English bass player

- Born: 16 January 1976 (age 50)
- Origin: York, England
- Genres: Rock, pop rock
- Occupation: musician
- Instrument: Bass guitar
- Years active: 1987–present

Stuart Michael Fletcher (born 16 January 1976) is an English bass player. He is best known as the bassist in John Squire's post The Stone Roses band, The Seahorses.

Prior to joining The Seahorses, Fletcher had been performing in local York bands since the age of 11.

On 22 March 1996 Fletcher was spotted by Squire in the York venue Fibbers, where he was playing with local blues pub band The Blueflies. He was filling in for the band's usual bass player, who was unable to play due to repetitive strain injury.

Following the gig, Fletcher was handed a cassette of demos Squire had recorded and asked to join the band.

Since the demise of the band, Fletcher has continued to play with local York bands such as Hayley Hutchinson, The Yards featuring fellow ex-Seahorse Chris Helme, and Rick Witter's band, Rick Witter & The Dukes. He has also done session work for Happy Mondays, Saint Etienne, The Calling and Chris Helme.

In 2009 he organised a charity gig in aid of the Guardian Angels high dependency unit for children at York Hospital. The objective was to climb the 5,895-metre summit of Mount Kilimanjaro in aid of the charity.

Fletcher joined We Could Be Astronauts in 2011 playing T in the Park 2012 on the BBC Introducing stage. Since 2012, Fletcher has also been a member of the Heather Findlay Band and York-based band Van Der Neer. More recently as well as regular gigs with the York-based cover band The Mothers, he is also playing in Chris Johnson's band Halo Blind and Heather Findlay's Mantra Vega. Fletcher has been the bassist of Hurricane #1 since 2018.
