= Ocean Pie =

Single by Shed Seven

from the album Change Giver
- B-side: "Never Again"; "Sleep Easy"; "Sensitive"
- Released: 31 October 1994
- Recorded: Greenhouse (London, England)
- Length: 4:39
- Label: Polydor
- Songwriter(s): Shed Seven, Rick Witter
- Producer(s): Jessica Corcoran

Shed Seven singles chronology
"Speakeasy" (1994)	"Ocean Pie" (1994)	"Where Have You Been Tonight?" (1995)

"Ocean Pie" is the fourth single release from Britpop band Shed Seven's debut album, Change Giver. The single was released in October 1994 and peaked at number 33 on the UK Singles Chart.

== Track listings ==
All tracks except track one were produced by Shed Seven and Tim Lewis.

7-inch and cassette single

1. "Ocean Pie" (4:39)
2. "Never Again" (3:35)

12-inch and CD single

1. "Ocean Pie" (4:39)
2. "Never Again" (3:35)
3. "Sleep Easy" (3:20)
4. "Sensitive" (4:05)
