= Paul Banks (English musician) =

English musician (born 1973)

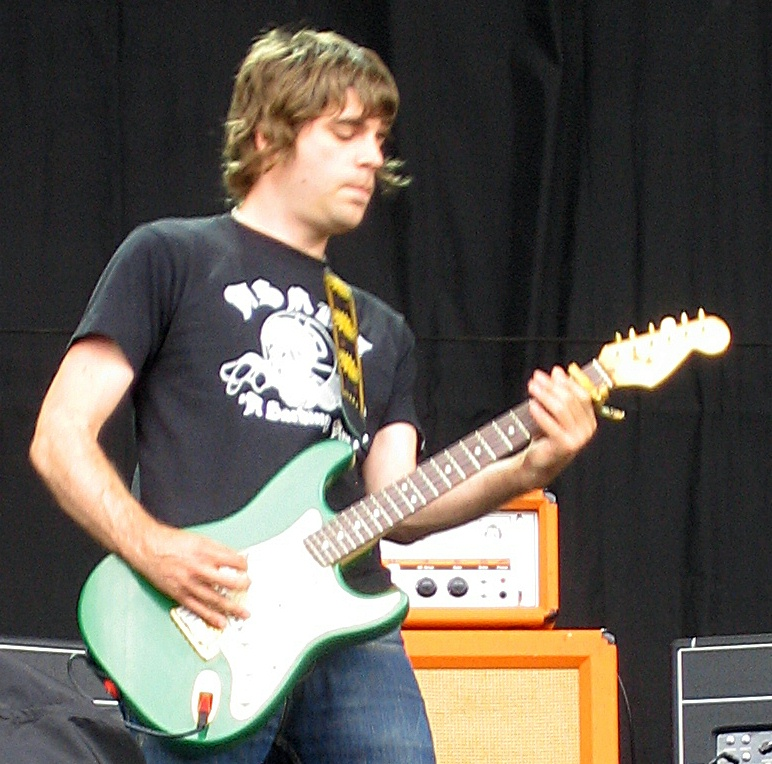
- Banks performing with Shed Seven at the 2008 V Festival

Background information
- Also known as: Banksy
- Born: 6 July 1973 (age 52); York, England
- Genres: Alternative rock Britpop; Indie rock
- Instrument: Guitar
- Years active: 1986–present
- Label: Polydor (1993–1999)

Paul Adrian Banks (born 6 July 1973) is an English musician. He is a songwriter and the lead guitarist with the rock band Shed Seven.

== Career ==
Paul Banks formed his first band with schoolfriend Rick Witter in 1986, while in his early teens, and went on to play in other local bands, including Brockley Haven, with Witter, Tom Gladwin and John Leach.

=== Shed Seven ===
Banks joined Witter, Gladwin and John's brother, drummer Alan Leach in Shed Seven just before they gained their first record deal with Polydor Records in 1993, replacing Joe Johnson as their lead guitarist. He spent the next six years recording and touring with the band. Banks became known for his distinctive, dramatic riffs and catchy tunes, and from 1993 to 1999 he co-wrote many of the band's most popular songs, with 14 consecutive hits in the UK including "Chasing Rainbows", "Going for Gold" and "She Left Me on Friday". The band's third album Let It Ride with all music composed by Banks to Witter's lyrics, spawned four singles which all reached the Top 40 of the UK singles chart.

In 1999 the record company asked Banks to write a new lead single for Shed Seven's "Greatest Hits" album, Going For Gold. The song, "Disco Down", later became a Top 20 hit, but Banks was becoming increasingly unhappy with the lack of originality in the music he was expected to write and perform. In an interview in 2002, he said:

I spent about two weeks, and I wrote a song called "Disco Down", that was just complete to a formula. "Right, that'll do, there's your single." And the record company creamed themselves when they heard it. It was like, "I can't do this any more." I was writing it, and I could see the video, and I could see the front cover of the single, and it was just complete formula. There was no soul in it...

Going For Gold – The Greatest Hits reached number 7 in the UK Albums Chart, but by the time Shed Seven finally left Polydor in 1999, Banks had already decided to leave the band.

The last straw was the Greatest Hits album….I can honestly say that I sold myself short for the last six months...I thought it was better to just stop it and move on.

=== The Rising ===
After parting with Shed Seven somewhat acrimoniously later that year, officially due to "musical differences", Banks returned to York and formed The Rising with David McKellar (of The 88's on vocals), Rob "Maxi" Maxfield (of Audioweb on drums) and Stuart Fletcher (of Rick Witter & The Dukes on bass). He also spent a short time with Fletcher in The Yards, as well as working as a freelance film-maker and music tutor, teaching guitar, bass and songwriting at his studio in Pocklington, York.

=== Albion ===
In late 2006, Paul joined the Alistair Griffin-fronted band, Albion. They wrote and recorded a number of songs together, releasing several free download-only tracks via their official MySpace page.

=== Shed Seven reunion ===
However, the following July saw Shed Seven announce their reformation, with the line-up including Banks along with all of the original members. His appearance on the subsequent Greatest Hits tour was the first time he had appeared on stage with the band since leaving in 1999. Following the announcement of the Shed Seven reunion, an official statement from the band noted that it would "not affect the individual members' projects which will continue as before". Yet, despite this vow, Albion abruptly split up in August 2007, for reasons which were not made public. When interviewed, Griffin commented "Things weren't working out the way we anticipated and it seemed the right time to call it a day".

Shed Seven have since recorded and released three new albums. Instant Pleasures in 2017 and A Matter of Time and Liquid Gold which were both released in 2024. Both A Matter of Time and Liquid Gold reached Number 1 in the UK music charts. The band continue to tour regularly.
