= Shed Seven =

English alternative rock band

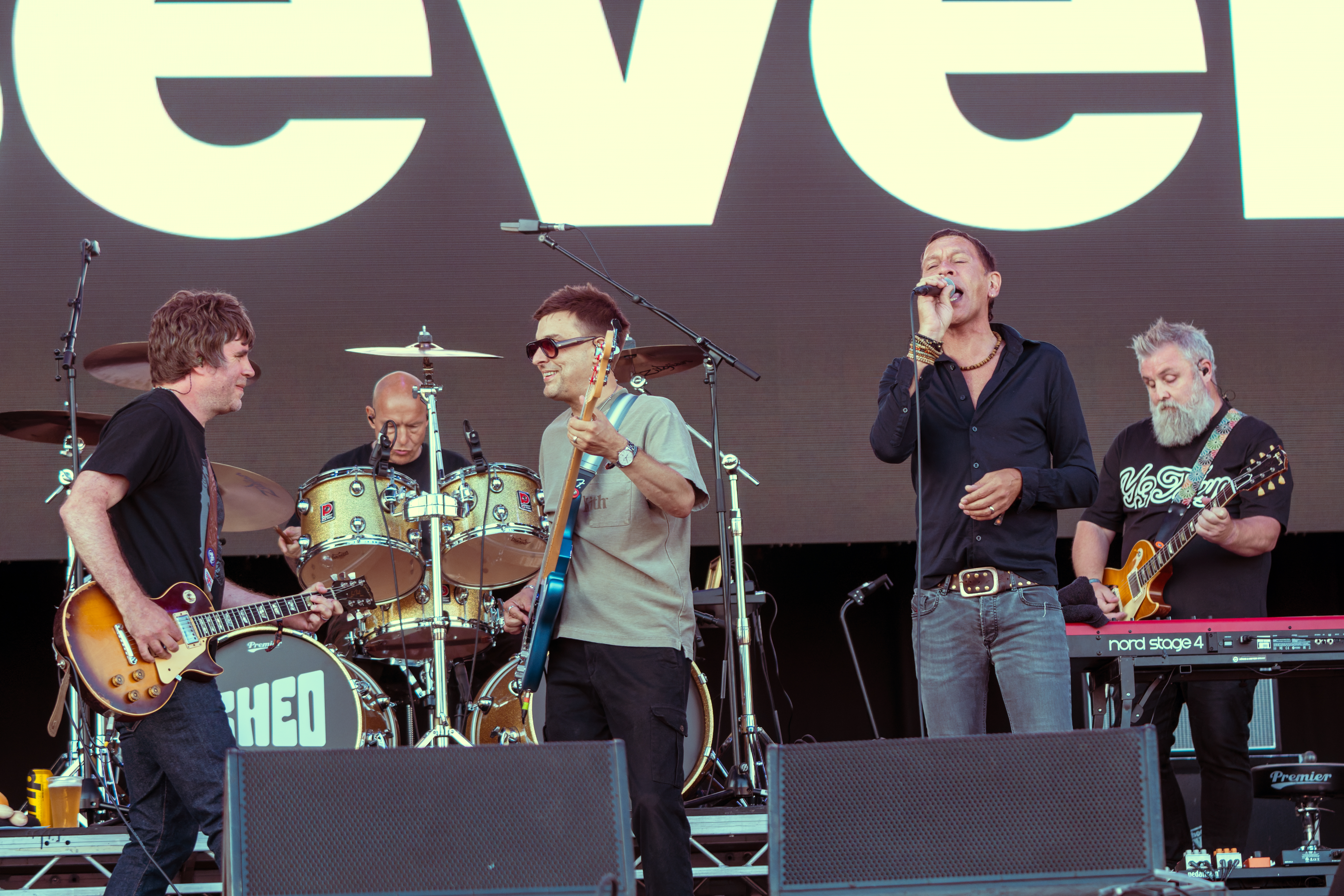
- Shed Seven performing at Victorious Festival 2025

Background information
- Origin: York, England
- Genres: Alternative rock; Britpop; indie rock
- Years active: 1990–2003; 2007–present
- Labels: Polydor; Artful; Taste Media; Blue Apple Music; BMG; Cooking Vinyl
- Members: Rick Witter; Paul Banks; Tom Gladwin; Tim Wills; Rob Maxfield
- Past members: Alan Leach; Joe Johnson; Fraser Smith
- Website: shedseven.com

Shed Seven are an English alternative rock band, formed in York in 1990. The band originally comprised singer Rick Witter, guitarist/keyboardist Joe Johnson, bassist Tom Gladwin and drummer Alan Leach. Johnson was later replaced by Paul Banks, but a later line-up of the band included both Johnson and Banks.

They have achieved 15 top 40 singles and five top 40 albums in the UK. The band officially broke up in 2003, but reformed for a greatest-hits tour in July 2007. Shed Seven continued to play shows around Britain periodically until releasing a new studio album in 2017 with the announcement of Instant Pleasures. Their latest album, A Matter of Time, was released on 5 January 2024 and became the first number one album of their career. Shed Seven released another album on 27 September of the same year, Liquid Gold, which went straight in at number one on the official UK Albums Chart, giving them a second number one album of the year.

== History ==
=== Early years ===
Shed Seven formed in 1990 from the remnants of Brockley Haven, a band featuring frontman Rick Witter, guitarist and songwriter Paul Banks, bassist Tom Gladwin (born Thomas Peter Gladwin, 11 January 1973), drummer Magnus Thompson and keyboardist John Leach, brother of Alan Leach (born Alan Steven Leach, 22 June 1970). Both Witter and Banks had also previously played together in a band named ENAM, performing to German exchange students in Banks's front room. Prior to signing a six-album deal with Polydor Records in October 1993, guitarist Joe Johnson (born Joseph Johnson, 18 June 1972) left the line-up and was replaced by Paul Banks. The band twice entered the local Fibbers/Evening Press Battle of the Bands competition, twice failing to win, whilst in September 1993, still unsigned, they were voted the third best live act at London's Inner City Festival. The initial press attention enjoyed by the band came as a result of the positive reviews of their live shows, coupled with complimentary comparisons to The Smiths. In March 1994, an article by Dave Simpson of Melody Maker, charting the aspirations of "the UK's brightest hopes", stated that; "...Shed Seven's beautifully posed, epic music is different. Not so much New Wave of New Wave as post-Smiths, they're taking the insular bedsit angst of Morrissey's early music and subverting it with a brash and insensitive sexual narcissism."

Their debut single, the double A-side "Mark"/"Casino Girl"—labelled by NME as "spirited 'Barbarism Begins at Home' skirl" – was released on 7 March 1994 to considerable acclaim from some sections of the music press, but failed to make the UK Top 40, peaking at number 80. The follow-up single, "Dolphin", a song co-written with former member Johnson during Banks' two-year absence from the band's line-up, was released on 13 June 1994 peaking at number 28 with first week sales reaching 15,000, leading to Shed Seven's first Top of the Pops appearance on 23 June 1994. Despite their third single release, "Speakeasy", entering the UK charts at number 24 and giving them their biggest hit to date, the first negative press reviews began to emerge. Writing for the UK music magazine NME in August 1994, John Mulvey believed that it represented "[f]our clumsy blokes trying to come over all sensuous, fragile and complex."—"Speakeasy" was later to be re-written as an advertising jingle in 1999, for the mobile phone company The Link, with Witter later admitting regret at his re-recording and re-wording of the original. As a result, the song was omitted from Shed Seven setlists for a number of years, only making its live comeback as a stripped-down acoustic version on their "farewell" tour in December 2003.

In September 1994, the band released their debut album, Change Giver, entering the UK album chart at number 16 and giving the group their first Gold disc. Despite it spending just two weeks in the chart, the "critically underrated debut album", which NME declared "an attempted stab in the face of their critics", gave the band three UK Top 40 singles. As well as enjoying popularity in both the UK and Australia, Shed Seven also found an audience in Thailand, where they managed to beat Take That to the Christmas number 1 spot with their fourth single release, "Ocean Pie". The following April, "Where Have You Been Tonight?", the first record to emerge from the band's collaboration with their new producer, Chris Sheldon, was issued as their fifth single, peaking at number 23 and continuing the band's chart-placing run. Although the single was "rush released" with the intention of it being followed by a swiftly recorded second album, the band failed to capitalize on the song's success as it became Shed Seven's one and only release throughout 1995.

=== Peak of success ===
With five UK Top 40 entries in 1996, Shed Seven had more hit singles than any other act that year, the high point coming with the release of their seventh single, "Going For Gold", which entered the UK chart at number 8 on 17 March and remains their biggest chart hit to date. A sold-out thirteen-date Autumn tour followed, including their debut at the York Barbican. The definitive band line-up released 3 studio albums—Change Giver (1994), A Maximum High (1996) and Let It Ride (1998)—along with a greatest hits compilation, Going For Gold (1999). The release of the latter was forced upon the band by their record company, Polydor, after Let It Ride failed to match the album sales of its predecessor, which sold 250,000 copies in Britain alone. Despite the band's reservations about issuing such a compilation so soon in their career, the album went on to sell 130,000 copies and featured brand new material in "Disco Down" and "High Hopes", both intended to be issued as singles. "Disco Down" went on to become the last Banks-era hit for the band, peaking at number 13, whilst "High Hopes" was sidelined by Polydor in favour of a proposed re-release of the previous single, "Going For Gold". However, the band refused to comply, leading to Shed Seven and Polydor Records parting company in late 1999;

The Greatest Hits wasn't our idea—we felt it was a few years too early—but agreed to do it on the understanding that we would release two new singles from the album. 'Disco Down' did really well and we were all prepared to follow it up with 'High Hopes', the video script was approved and it was ready to go to radio, when some higher authority decided it would be a better idea to re-release 'Going For Gold' instead. We put our foot down and said 'no way, we are not going to rip off our fans with old material'. In fact, most people at the label thought it was an awful idea.

=== Shed Seven mark II ===
By 1998, keyboardist Fraser Smith had been recruited as a session player to join the band on tour. As a session player, Smith also played keyboards on the new tracks recorded for the Greatest Hits album in 1999. In December 1999, guitarist Paul Banks left the band by mutual consent with Rick Witter citing "musical differences" for the split. During an NME interview about his post-Shed Seven band, The Rising, Banks commented on his departure from the group, explaining that he felt more respected and accepted in his new band. Banks was replaced by original guitarist Joe Johnson in early 2000 while Fraser Smith became a permanent member of the band around the same time. Now officially a five-piece and with a new songwriting team consisting of Witter, Johnson and Smith, the band signed a new contract with Artful Records and in May 2001 went on to release their fourth studio album, Truth Be Told, which was preceded by the lead single "Cry For Help". That summer the band performed at the festivals T in the Park and V2001.

Despite their new deal, the band remained dissatisfied with the lack of promotional support from their label and frustrated by delayed releases. This was highlighted by Artful's decision to change the planned second single from Truth Be Told, "Step Inside Your Love" from chart-eligible formats and a planned release date of July 2001, to a non chart-eligible 4-track EP released in October 2001. The band were further hindered by BBC Radio 1's decision not to playlist them in their post-Polydor days despite DJ Chris Moyles being a long-time supporter of the band. The band parted company with Artful Records in 2002.

=== Beginning of the end ===
In 2003, Shed Seven found a new home at Taste Media, and soon returned to the charts with the single, "Why Can't I Be You?", released on 5 May and peaking at number 23. The song proved to be their first and last single release for the label, as the band lost patience with Taste's refusal to release their fully recorded would-be fifth studio album, slated for release in September 2003. With Taste demanding another big hit before they were willing to release a new Shed Seven album, the ready and complete LP was held back indefinitely. As a consequence, the band announced their imminent split via a statement issued through the official Shed Seven website on 23 November 2003, explaining that their then-current UK tour—which took place between November and December 2003—would become the group's "farewell tour":

Although we feel that certain aspects of the music industry have put a strain on the recording side of things in recent years, the one thing that has remained consistent throughout has been the band's love of performing live and the ability to please the fans by giving 100% every time. This is exactly what we plan to do at these last remaining shows, making a special effort to play what people want to hear. It will be a celebration, a retrospective, a Shed Seven tour to remember.

The final tour was a sell-out success, with the last gig played on 20 December 2003 at the York Barbican, in their hometown of York. One further album release did, however, come of their time at Taste: their only official live album, Where Have You Been Tonight? Live. Recorded at various destinations on tour in December 2002, the album was released in May 2003, six months before the band's farewell tour began. Despite gaining a loyal and ever-growing following of fans—sometimes referred to as "Shed Heads"—the band failed to receive universal positive press attention in the UK; NME never featured Shed Seven on its cover, whilst the now defunct Melody Maker did so once.

=== Post-split ===
==== Album releases ====
An alternative hits album, The Collection, which in large part featured album tracks and B-sides, surfaced in 2004. In 2005, after many requests from fans, the band eventually released an official post-split album, One Hand Clapping. The 'new' material, which would have been the band's fifth studio album, featured unreleased demos of songs that were submitted to, and refused by, Taste Media in 2003. The album was initially released in a strictly limited run of 1,000 copies, although a Japanese version of the album, complete with four extra acoustic tracks, enhanced sleeve notes and complete lyrics, was released in June 2006.

==== Band members ====
Lead singer Rick Witter began a solo career with Rick Witter & The Dukes in 2005. The band played several low-key gigs in Scotland as well as two sold-out shows in York shortly before Christmas of the same year, before embarking on a month-long tour in April and May 2006. Their debut album, The Year of the Rat, was released on 16 April 2007. Alan Leach opened a commercial recording studio in York, taught drums and began hosting pub quizzes, during this time he co-founded SpeedQuizzing LTD with his brother who now produce and sell smartphone pub quiz software globally. Tom Gladwin went on to join the Leeds-based pop/dance outfit The Clients with former members of The Dandys. In 2007, Tom formed a new band, People in Airports, with singer-songwriter and guitarist Paul Downes. After leaving Shed Seven, Paul Banks went on to form The Rising, a York-based band composed of Banks, David McKellar (formerly of The 88's), Rob "Maxi" Maxfield (formerly of Audioweb) and Stuart Fletcher (formerly of The Seahorses and who later joined Rick Witter & The Dukes). Banks became a filmmaker, starting his own production company in 2002 he has produced & directed films for the likes of Richard Ashcroft, Faithless and The Script. Joe Johnson taught guitar in his hometown, and joined a Canadian band named the Black Sours. Fraser Smith is now a London-based record producer and songwriter, currently signed to Notting Hill Music, and has produced and mixed records for acts such as Ian Brown, Hayley Hutchinson and The Yards.

=== Reformation ===
==== Reunion tours ====
On 7 July 2007, the band announced a greatest hits reunion tour of 14 UK venues for November and December 2007, starting at the Music Hall in Aberdeen on 27 November and culminating at London's Shepherd's Bush Empire on 14 December. The reformed line-up featured all of the band's original members, including both Joe Johnson and Paul Banks, who appeared together for the very first time; keyboardist and songwriter Fraser Smith, however, took no part in the reunion. It was the first time Banks had appeared on stage with the band since his departure in 1999. The band's accompanying official announcement stated that: "These plans do not affect the individual members' projects which will continue as before. This includes Rick, who recently released a debut album with his new band The Dukes". Yet, despite this vow, both Witter and Banks' respective bands—The Dukes and Albion—suffered due to the renewed commitment to their old band's new outing. Banks parted company with the Alistair Griffin-fronted outfit the following month, whilst Witter completed one further UK tour with The Dukes prior to Shed Seven's Reunion Tour warm-up show in Hull on 25 November.

By mid-July, several major venues had sold out and a further six concerts were announced, including two extra dates in London's Shepherd's Bush Empire. The revised tour finished on 22 December 2007 at Glasgow's Carling Academy. Paul Banks commented: "None of us could have predicted the overwhelming response to the Shed Seven Reunion Tour. This has now turned into the biggest tour that the band has ever undertaken." Although Shed Seven did not undertake a further tour of their own, 2008 saw the band return to two of the UK's biggest festivals; T in the Park in Balado, Scotland, and V in both Chelmsford and Staffordshire.

Shed Seven undertook an eighteen date tour of Scotland and England in late 2009 early 2010. Other dates in 2010 included V Festival, T in the Park, Greenbelt and two dates at the recently reopened Fibbers venue in September.

The band announced a Christmas tour for 2011 – celebrating the 15 years since the release of A Maximum High. The tour, entitled 'The Maximum Hits Tour' focused on their output during the A Maximum High era, and included a brass section on tour for the first time.

==== Album and EP releases ====
In September 2007, Universal Music and Polydor Records announced the release of a double CD album featuring the best of Shed Seven's BBC recordings. Unlike a "Greatest hits" package, Live at the BBC is an alternate take on the band's career, and comprises some of their biggest hits alongside lesser-known album tracks and B-sides. All of the tracks included were recorded live between 1994 and 1997 at the BBC's Maida Vale studios, or for Radio 1's Live in Concert broadcasts. Released on 15 October 2007, the track list was hand-picked by the band, with sleeve notes written by Paul Banks and artwork featuring rare photos from the recording of the sessions at the BBC's studios.

A further EP was released on 7 November 2011. The CD, released in conjunction with the 2011 tour, featured four re-worked tracks from their A Maximum High album, released 15 years previously. The four songs were re-recorded and reworked with an orchestral feel over the course of a weekend in September. The CD was limited to 777 hand numbered copies available exclusively from their official website, though digital versions are freely available from the major online retailers. The CD, released on the Blue Apple Music label, sold out within two hours.

On 20 February 2017 the band announced they would be releasing their first studio album for 16 years later in the year and would be touring throughout December 2017 in support of Instant Pleasures. Cast would be supporting them on the tour. Flick of the Finger gave the album a positive 5 star review, with the publication stating with regard to the album's closing song, Invincible: '...ends on lyrics of “even if we crash and burn in the end”, but with a collection of songs here that invoke so many emotions, it's hard to see the band ever coming to a crash and burn finale.'

On 12 October 2019, Shed Seven played a short pre-match set prior to the 2019 Super League Grand Final at Old Trafford, Manchester.

In December 2020, Shed Seven released a live album called Another Night, Another Town. They headlined an all-Yorkshire rock festival in June 2021 with support from The Wedding Present, Skylights and The Pigeon Detectives.

On 17 August 2021, the band announced that Alan Leach and Joe Johnson would be leaving the band after their summer festival commitments with Shed Seven had been fulfilled. The remaining members would continue with the following winter tour, and further announcements would follow regarding replacement personnel.

On 3 February 2023, Shed Seven announced that they would be recording a new album in Spain, once again with producer Youth and new band members Tim Wills (keyboards and guitar, born Timothy James Wills, 5 July 1971) and Rob Maxfield (drums).

On 5 January 2024, Shed Seven released A Matter of Time, their sixth studio album. This was to become the band's first ever number 1 album in the Official Charts.

On 27 September 2024, Shed Seven released Liquid Gold, their seventh studio album, consisting of re-imagined/re-recorded versions of their songs. This was to become the band's second number 1 album in the Official Charts, and their second number 1 album in the same year, something achieved by few artists

In June 2026, the band released "Stand Together" as the lead single for their self-titled album. Their seventh album, it is scheduled to release on January 8, 2027.

== Discography ==
- Change Giver (1994)
- A Maximum High (1996)
- Let It Ride (1998)
- Truth Be Told (2001)
- Instant Pleasures (2017)
- A Matter of Time (2024)
- Shed Seven (2027)
