= Rick Witter =

English singer-songwriter (born 1972)

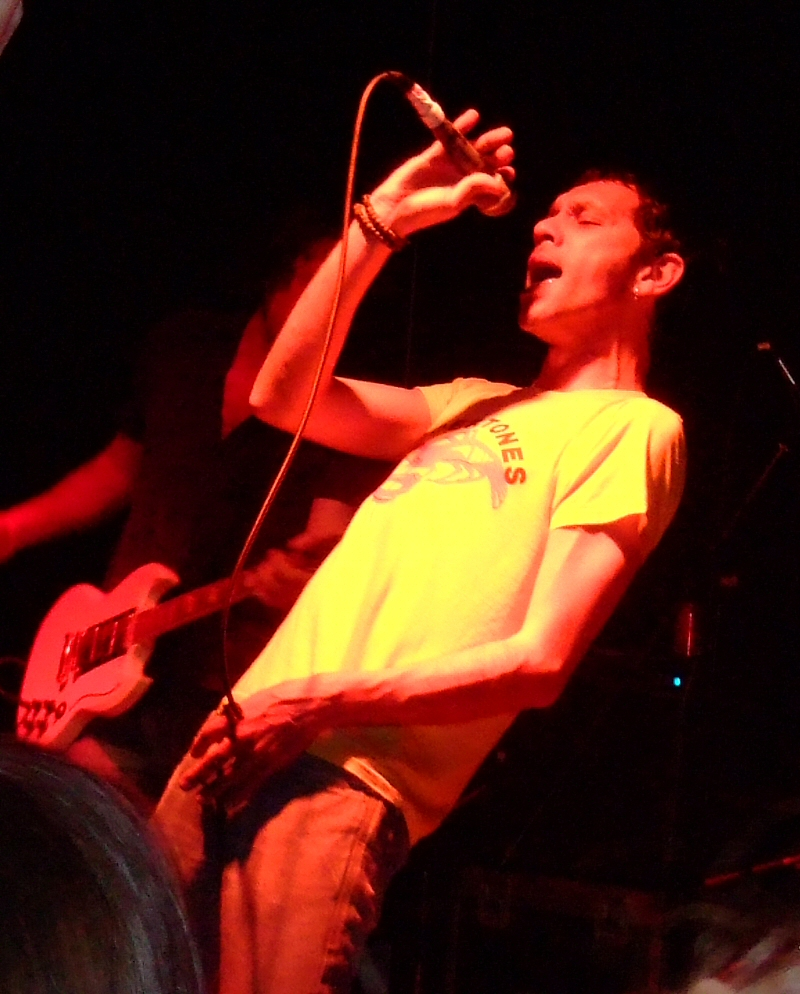
- Witter performing in 2007

Background information
- Born: Richard James Witter; 23 November 1972 (age 53); Stockport, Greater Manchester, England
- Genres: Britpop; alternative rock; indie rock
- Occupations: Singer; songwriter
- Instrument: Vocals
- Years active: 1986–present
- Labels: Hookline and Singer
- Member of: Shed Seven
- Formerly of: Rick Witter & The Dukes
- Website: rick-witter.co.uk

Richard James Witter (born 23 November 1972) is an English singer and songwriter, best known as the frontman of York band Shed Seven.

He was educated at Huntington School, York.

== Professional career ==
Rick Witter formed his first band with schoolfriend Paul Banks in 1986, while still in his teens, and played in various local bands, including Brockley Haven, with Banks, Tom Gladwin and John Leach.

=== Shed Seven ===
In 1990, Witter, along with Gladwin, John's brother, drummer Alan Leach and guitarist Joe Johnson, formed Shed Seven. Rick signed his first record deal with the band in 1993. Just prior to signing their six-album deal with Polydor Records, Banks joined the line-up as their new lead guitarist, replacing the departing Joe Johnson. Rick spent the following 10 years recording and touring with the band, co-writing many of the band's songs. From 1994 to 2003 the group had 15 consecutive Top 40 hits in the UK Singles Chart.

=== Rick Witter & the Dukes ===
Witter also fronted Rick Witter & the Dukes, who feature Rob Wilson on guitar and Stuart Fletcher (ex-Seahorses) on bass. They independently released their debut album The Year of the Rat in April 2007. The LP is dedicated to the memory of Roger Witter, Rick's father.

== See also ==
- List of people from Stockport
- List of notable people associated with York
