= I Love You, Oh No =

"I Love You, Oh No!"

Song by Plastics

from the album Welcome Plastics
- Released: 1979
- Label: Invitation Records
- Songwriter(s): Chica Sato, Hajime Tachibana, Toshio Nakanishi

"I Love You, Oh No!" is a song written by Chica Sato, Hajime Tachibana, and Toshio Nakanishi for Plastics, released in 1979 from their debut album Welcome Plastics.

== Cover versions ==
The song was covered by Stereo Total as "I Love You Ono" – a play of words on both the original Plastics title and Yoko Ono – and is a likely homage to the original version's Japanese origin. It was released on the band's 1999 concept album My Melody, published through Bobsled Records.

It was used by Sony in a European commercial for the Handycam in June 2005, and was also featured in Robot Food's snowboarding hit "Afterbang". In 2009, the song was used in a Dell commercial for the Studio 15. In 2012 the song was used for the Dior ADDICT Fragrance commercial. In 2013 it was used as the theme music for Channel 4's Anna and Katy - the choice of the show's co-writers and performers, Anna Crilly and Katy Wix.
