= The In-Kraut, Vol. 2 =

The In-Kraut Vol. 2

Compilation album by Various artists
- Released: November 21, 2006
- Recorded: 1967–1974
- Genre: Pop
- Label: Marina

The In-Kraut chronology
The In-Kraut, Vol 1. (2005)	The In-Kraut Vol. 2 (2006)	The In-Kraut, Vol 3 (2008)

Professional ratings
Review scores
Source	Rating
Foxy Digitalis	link
PopMatters	link
Time Out	link

The In-Kraut, Vol. 2: Hip-Shaking Grooves Made in Germany 1967-1974 is the second volume in the In-Kraut series that was released by Marina Records on compact disc and double vinyl in October 2006.

The album is a collection of obscuro German pop rarities, collected from various soundtracks and singles by artists who never intended to have their music released outside Germany. It includes an early track by Krautrock band Can under the name The Inner Space, featuring the vocals of German actress, model, and author Rosemarie Heinikel, from 1968.

== Track listing ==
1. "This Is Soul" (Paul Nero) – 0:56
2. "Black Night" (Hugo Strasser) – 3:12
3. "Wildkatze " (Christer Bladin) – 3:15
4. "Swingle Beat" (Ambros Seelos) – 2:57
5. "Pealed Tomato" (Tommy Haggard) – 2:13
6. "Swinging London" (Hazy Osterwald Jet Set) – 3:15
7. "Nofrete's Headache" (Charly Antolini's Power Dozen) – 4:30
8. "Soul March" (James Last) – 3:06
9. "Blauer Montag" (Mary Roos) – 4:24
10. "Get It On" (Klaus Weiss Orchestra) – 2:50
11. "Holiday Time" (Hildegard Knef) – 4:35
12. "Rock In" (The Dometown Gang) – 3:11
13. "Do It Yourself" (Rolf Wilhelm) – 2:50
14. "Run Away" (The Joy & Hit Kids) – 2:24
15. "No No No" (Dieter Reith) – 3:46
16. "Gimmi Moro" (Carlos Fendeira) – 3:59
17. "Moon Mission" (Kai Rautenberger, Orchester Jürgen Ehlers) – 2:54
18. "Kamera Song" (The Inner Space) – 2:29
19. "Sand auf Sylt" (Uli Roever) – 1:59
20. "Eine kleine Hasenmusik" (Hase Cäsar) – 1:25
