= Skylab (band) =

English/Japanese musical group

- Genres: Trip hop
- Years active: 1993–2017
- Members: Howie B; Mat Ducasse; Masayuki Kudo; Toshio Nakanishi; Debbie Sanders

Skylab was an English and Japanese electronic music group formed in 1993 by Howie B, Mat Ducasse, Masayuki Kudo, and Toshio Nakanishi. In 1994, they released their debut studio album, #1, and in 1999 followed it with #2 (Large as Life and Twice as Natural), which Fact magazine ranked at #17 on its list of "50 Best Trip-Hop Albums of All Time" in 2015.

Nakanishi and Kudo (also known as Tosh & K.U.D.O.) had previously collaborated as members of Japanese groups such as Melon and Major Force, while Howie B had engineered and mixed for Siouxsie and the Banshees, Soul II Soul, and Massive Attack. Vocalist Debbie Sanders first sang on #1 and was later made an official member of the group.

Skylab remixed for and/or collaborated with acts such as Depeche Mode, Silver Apples, Shakespears Sister, David Holmes, Zap Mama, Barry Adamson, and Baxter. Their work has also been featured on multiple compilations from the Red Hot AIDS Benefit Series.

Nakanishi died of esophageal cancer in 2017, aged 61.

== Discography ==
Studio albums

- #1 (1994)
- #2 (Large as Life and Twice as Natural) (1999)

EPs

- Oh! (1995)
- ? (1997)
- Judas! (1997)
- Magenta (1998)

Singles

- "River of Bass"/"Electric Blue" (1994)
- "Seashell"/"Next" (1994)
- "Exotika" (1995)
- "These Are the Blues" (1996)
- "The Trip" (1996)
- "Bite This!" (1997)
- "Promotion" (1998)
- "The Viper" (2003)
- "Whuteverrpella" (2021)
