= Stereo Total (album) =

Compilation album by Stereo Total
- Released: November 1998
- Genre: Pop punk
- Length: 51:20
- Label: Bobsled

Stereo Total chronology
Monokini (1997)	Stereo Total (1998)	Juke-Box Alarm (1998)

Stereo Total is a compilation album by the band of the same name, released in 1998 on Bobsled Records. It was the first album the band released in the United States, and features songs from their first two albums (Oh Ah! and Monokini). Upon its release, it received favorable reviews from Spin, the Washington City Paper, and the Village Voice, and the band went on a tour in support of the album in the following spring.

Professional ratings
Review scores
Source	Rating
AllMusic	3/5 stars
The Village Voice	(choice cut)

== Track listing ==
1. Dactylo Rock
2. C'Est la Mort
3. Furore
4. Schön Von Hinten
5. Movie Star
6. CA, USA LA
7. Get Down Tonight
8. Comme un Garcon
9. Ach Ach Liebling
10. Push It
11. Miau Miau
12. Supergirl
13. Ushilo Sugata Ga Kilei
14. Johnny
15. Morose
16. Dilindam
17. Je Suis Venu Te Dire Que Je M'En Vais
