= Welcome Plastics =

Studio album by Plastics
- Released: 25 January 1980
- Recorded: September 1979
- Studio: Shalom Under the Church
- Genres: New wave; post-punk; synthpop
- Length: 42:22
- Languages: English; Japanese
- Labels: Victor; Invitation
- Producer: Plastics

Plastics chronology
Welcome Plastics (1980)	Origato Plastico (1980)

Singles from Welcome Plastics
- 1. "Top Secret Man" / "Copy" Released: 1979; 2. "Copy" / "Robot" Released: 1979; 3. "Delicious" Released: 1980

Welcome Plastics is the debut studio album by Japanese rock band Plastics. The album, produced by the band, was released on 25 January 1980 by the Victor Music Industries label Invitation.

== Reception ==
Professional ratings
Review scores
Source	Rating
Fact	favourable
Trouser Press	favourable

Trouser Press called the album "marvelous and well worth finding for fans of extreme kitsch and quirk". In 2007, the album was ranked number 19 in the Japanese edition Rolling Stone's list of "The 100 Greatest Japanese Rock Albums of All Time".

== Track listing ==
All lyrics are written by Toshio Nakanishi, except where noted; all music is composed by Hajime Tachibana and Toshi, except where noted.

Side one
No.	Title	Writer(s)	Length
1.	"Top Secret Man"		2:25
2.	"Digital Watch"	Chica Sato (lyrics)	2:29
3.	"Copy"		2:20
4.	"I Am Plastic"		1:55
5.	"I Wanna Be Plastic"	Chica (lyrics)	1:30
6.	"Can I Help Me?"		4:10
7.	"Too Much Information"		2:17
8.	"Welcome Plastics"	Kazumi Yasui, Tadao Inoue	2:58

Side two
No.	Title	Writer(s)	Length
1.	"I Love You Oh No!"	Chica (lyrics)	4:16
2.	"Robot"		2:54
3.	"Delicious"	Chica (lyrics)	2:48
4.	"Last Train to Clarksville"	Tommy Boyce, Bobby Hart	3:03
5.	"Deluxe"		3:56
6.	"Complex"		5:21

== Personnel ==
Plastics

- Toshio Nakanishi – voice, guitar
- Chica Sato – voice, dance
- Hajime Tachibana – guitar
- Masahide Sakuma – synthesizer
- Takemi Shima – rhythm box

Technical

- Plastics – producers
- Toshio Nakanishi – illustration
- Hajime Tachibana – graphic design
- Tohru Kogure – photograph
- Kohzoh Kenmochi – re-mix engineer
- Haruo Okada – recording engineer
- Tatsuo Sano – recording engineer
- We Love Music, P.M.P. – mastering

== Release history ==
Date	Label(s)	Format	Catalog	Notes
25 January 1980	Victor Music Industries, Invitation	LP	VIH-6065	
25 January 1980	Victor Music Industries, Invitation	CS	VCF-1560	
21 April 1990	Victor Music Industries, Invitation	CD	VICL-2013	
22 September 2004	Victor Entertainment	CD	VICL-41148	
23 May 2012	Tower Records	CD	NCS-827	Limited reissue, sold only through Tower Records.
25 January 1980	Victor Entertainment	SHM-CD	VICL-70215〜6	Branded a "Deluxe Edition". Contains additional studio tracks following the album, as well as an extra disc with 2 exclusive live performances. Remastered by Hiroshi Kawasaki and Takahiro Uchida, with exclusive photographs and liner notes by Tohru Kogure.

- The entire album is included on the Forever Plastico compilation album.
- "Copy", "Robot", "Delicious", "Digital Watch", "Complex", "Last Train to Clarksville", "Can I Help Me?", "I Love You Oh No!" and "Welcome Plastics" are included on the Origato 25 compilation album.
- "Top Secret Man", "Copy" and "Delicious" are included (as part of music videos) on the Deluxe Edition 2016 reissue of Origato Plastico.
