= Ringo, I Love You =

Single by Bonnie Jo Mason
- B-side: "Beatle Blues" (Instrumental)
- Released: March 4, 1964
- Recorded: February 1964
- Genre: Pop rock
- Length: 1:50
- Label: Annette Records
- Songwriters: Phil Spector; Paul Case; Vini Poncia; Peter Andreoli
- Producer: Phil Spector

Bonnie Jo Mason singles chronology
"Ringo, I Love You" (1964)	"Dream Baby" (1964)

"Ringo, I Love You" is a rock song performed by the American singer-actress Cher released under the pseudonym Bonnie Jo Mason, the name she used at the start of her career when based in Los Angeles. The song was released as a promotional single in 1964 during the height of Beatlemania. It was a tribute to the Beatles. The original vinyl is now a valuable rarity. In 1999, the song was covered by German electronic duo Stereo Total and released on their studio album My Melody.

== Song information ==
"Ringo, I Love You" is the first solo song recorded by Cher. The single was released under the name of Bonnie Jo Mason because producer Phil Spector wanted American names for his singers, and Cherilyn La Piere was not a name he considered sufficiently American.

The single failed to chart nationally, and did not pick up much local radio play, although it was a minor hit in Buffalo, New York. It has been suggested that many radio stations would not consider playing the record because they thought Cher's extremely low vocals were a man's vocals and objected to playing what they believed to be a homosexual love song; the artist's female moniker, however, and the fact that the singer explicitly identifies herself as a girl in the lyrics makes this story open to question. The track does not have Spector's usual Wall of Sound production techniques, instead featuring more of a crudely arranged "beat group" sound. Spector, if he did indeed produce the track, took no producer credit, and the record did not appear on Philles Records, Spector's usual label.

"Beatle Blues" is on the single's B-side, a typical tossed-off Spector instrumental made so that the A-side would get all the attention. "Ringo, I Love You" has been released on compact disc on small indie record label, although not on Cher releases; these albums are Bravo! Beatles, Phil Spector - Masterpiece (Volume 3), Flabby Road, Before They Were Stars (Volume 2), Everything You Always Wanted To Know About Rock & Roll (Volume 1) and Girls in the Garage (Volume 4).
