= Just a Girl (disambiguation) =

"Just a Girl" is a 1995 song by No Doubt

Just a Girl may also refer to:

== Music ==
- Just a Girl (album) or the title song, by Bonnie Pink, 2001
- "Just a Girl", a song by Miley Cyrus as Hannah Montana from Hannah Montana 3, 2009
- "Just A Girl", a song by the Pale Fountains from Pacific Street, 1984
- "Just a Girl", a song by Pearl Jam from Ten, 2009 reissue
- "Just a Girl", a song by Lady Antebellum from 747, 2014

== Other media ==
- Just a Girl; or, The Strange Duchess, an 1895 novel by Charles Garvice
- Just a Girl (film), a 1916 film adaptation of the novel
- Just a Girl, a 2004 manga by Tomoko Taniguchi

== See also ==
- I'm Just a Girl, a 2003 album by Deana Carter, or the title song
- "I'm Just a Girl" (Bachelor Girl song), 2002
- "Just the Girl", a 2005 song by the Click Five
