= My Melody (Stereo Total album) =

Studio album by Stereo Total
- Released: April 27, 1999
- Genre: Electropop, synthpop, indie

Stereo Total chronology
Juke-Box Alarm (1998)	My Melody (1999)	Musique Automatique (2001)

Professional ratings
Review scores
Source	Rating
Allmusic	link

My Melody is Stereo Total's fourth album. This album's theme was centered on love. It was released on April 27, 1999. The second track on the album, "I Love You, Ono" was featured in a 2009 commercial for Dell's Studio 15. The song is a cover of "I Love You, Oh No!" by Plastics.

== Track listing ==
1. "Beauty Case" - 2:44
2. "I Love You, Ono" - 3:08
3. "Plötzlich Ist Alles Anders" - 2:18
4. "Larmes Toxiques" - 3:32
5. "Discjockey" - 3:19
6. "Ich Liebe Dich, Alexander" - 2:01
7. "Tout Le Monde Se Fout Des Fleurs" - 3:05
8. "Vilaines Filles, Mauvais Garcons" - 2:01
9. "Sous La Douche" - 1:59
10. "Du Und Dein Automobil" - 3:23
11. "Partir Ou Mourir" - 3:00
12. "Ringo, I Love You" - 1:27
13. "Tokyo Mon Amour" - 3:07
14. "Milky Boy Bourgeois" - 2:04
15. "Die Krise" - 3:16
16. "Joe Le Taxi" - 3:04
