= Ambros Seelos =

- Born: 30 January 1935; Töging am Inn, Germany
- Died: 3 August 2015 (aged 80) Mühldorf, Germany
- Genres: Big band, disco
- Years active: 1956–2011

Ambros Seelos (30 January 1935 – 3 August 2015) was a German music composer, singer, arranger, conductor, whose career lasted from the 1950s to the 2000s.

Ambros Seelos was born in Töging am Inn. Seelos and his orchestra performed Big Band sound music. He worked along with Dalibor Brazda in his music endeavors as well. He contributed with The In-Kraut in a song titled "Swingle Beat", volume 2. He also collaborated with Sylvester Levay on numerous music industry albums and songs, in Germany where Ambros Seelos is well known. He produced an album titled "I Left My Heart in Heidleberg", with Sylvester Levay with singer/song writer Troy Cory in 1970. He died in Mühldorf am Inn, aged 80.
