= Discothèque (disambiguation) =

A discothèque is an entertainment venue or club with recorded music rather than a live band. It may be part of a nightclub.

Discothèque or variants may also refer to:

== Music ==
=== Albums ===
- Discothèque (Herbie Mann album), 1975
- Discotheque (Stereo Total album), 2005
- Discothèque (Marcia Hines album), 2006

=== Songs ===
- "Discothèque" (song), a 1997 song by U2
- "Discotek", a song by S Club, a B-side of the 2002 single "Alive"
- "Discotech" (song), a 2007 song by Young Love
- "Discoteque" (song), a 2021 song by The Roop, representing Lithuania in the Eurovision Song Contest

== Other uses ==
- Discotek Media, an entertainment company
