= Musique Automatique =

Studio album by Stereo Total
- Released: October 8, 2001
- Genre: Electronic
- Label: Kill Rock Stars; Bobsled

Stereo Total chronology
My Melody (1999)	Musique Automatique (2001)	Do the Bambi (2005)

Musique Automatique is Stereo Total's fifth album. It was released on October 8, 2001, on Bobsled Records, and was re-released by Kill Rock Stars in 2002.

== Track listing ==
1. Automatic Music 3:18
2. L'Amour A 3 3:12
3. Ma Radio 2:23
4. Wir Tanzen Im 4-Eck 1:59
5. Les Chansons D'A 3:38
6. Kleptomane 3:00
7. Adieu Adieu 3:22
8. Forever 16 1:43
9. Je Suis Une Poupée 2:37
10. Ich Weiss Nicht Mehr Genau 2:10
11. Le Diable 2:09
12. Nationale 7 2:19
13. Exakt Neutral 3:12
14. Ypsilon 3:55
15. Hep Onaltı 'Da 1:47
16. Love With The 3 Of Us 3:12

Professional ratings
Aggregate scores
Source	Rating
Metacritic	75/100
Review scores
Source	Rating
Allmusic	3/5 stars
Pitchfork Media	(8.0/10.0)
The Village Voice	(choice cut)
