= Water gun (disambiguation) =

A water gun is a type of toy gun that shoots jets of water.

Water gun or watergun may also refer to:

== Music ==
- "Watergun" (song), a 2023 song by Remo Forrer
- "Water Guns", a song by Todrick Hall from the 2016 album Straight Outta Oz
- "Waterguns", a song by Caravan Palace from the 2019 album Chronologic

== Other uses ==
- Deluge gun, an aimable controllable high-capacity water jet used for manual firefighting or automatic fire protection systems
- Water cannon, a device that shoots a high-velocity stream of water
- Underwater firearm, a firearm designed for use underwater

== See also ==
- Waterpistol (album), a 1995 album by Shack
