= Pacific Street =

Studio album by The Pale Fountains
- Released: February 27, 1984
- Studios: Village Way Studios; The Manor, Shipton-on-Cherwell; Ridge Farm Studios, Capel, Dorking; Nova Sound Studios, Marble Arch, London
- Length: 37:25
- Label: Virgin
- Producers: Howard Gray, the Pale Fountains

The Pale Fountains chronology
Pacific Street (1984)	From Across the Kitchen Table (1985)

Professional ratings
Review scores
Source	Rating
AllMusic	2.5/5 stars

Pacific Street is the debut album by British band the Pale Fountains. The CD version of the album contains the first 11 tracks plus 4 bonus songs: "Thank You", "Meadow of Love", "Palm of My Hand" and "Love's a Beautiful Place".

Pacific Street features an acoustic sound, with trumpet and flute, influenced by Burt Bacharach, Love and bossa nova in the context of melodic pop songs.

The band would record one more album before splitting and Head would re-emerge a few years later fronting Shack.

== Track listing ==
All tracks are written by Michael Head.

No.	Title	Length
1.	"Reach"	4:10
2.	"Something on My Mind"	3:55
3.	"Unless"	4:40
4.	"Southbound Excursion"	2:32
5.	"Natural"	3:20
6.	"Faithful Pillow (Pt.1)"	1:39
7.	"(Don't Let Your Love) Start a War"	3:38
8.	"Beyond Friday's Field"	4:03
9.	"Abergele Next Time"	3:49
10.	"Crazier"	3:40
11.	"Faithful Pillow (Pt.2)"	1:59
Total length:		37:25

Japanese Limited Edition
No.	Title	Length
12.	"Thank You"
13.	"Meadow of Love"
14.	"(There's Always) Something on My Mind" (remix)
15.	"Palm of My Hand"
16.	"Unless" (extended version)
17.	"(Don't Let Your Love) Start a War" (alt. version)
18.	"Just a Girl" (re-recording)
19.	"Palm of My Hand" (instrumental)
20.	"Love Situation"
21.	"(Don't Let Your Love) Start a War" (extended version)

== Personnel ==
=== The Pale Fountains ===
- Mick Head – vocals, guitar
- John Head – lead guitar
- Chris McCaffrey – bass, percussion
- Thomas Whelan – drums, percussion
- Andy Diagram – trumpet, keyboards

=== Additional musicians ===
- Marc L'Etarjet – cello
- Trixi – keyboards
- Julie Andrews – flute
