= Kevin Junior =

American singer-songwriter

- Born: Kevin Bain Gerber; December 26, 1969; Akron, Ohio, U.S.
- Died: January 16, 2016 (aged 46) Akron, Ohio, U.S.
- Genres: Rock
- Occupations: Singer-songwriter, musician, rock critic
- Instruments: Guitar, vocals
- Years active: 1986–2006
- Labels: Bobsled Records, Sunthunder Records, Hanky Panky Records

Kevin Bain Gerber (December 26, 1969 – January 16, 2016), known as Kevin Junior, was an American singer-songwriter and guitarist. He is best known for his band The Chamber Strings as well as working with Swell Maps members Nikki Sudden and Epic Soundtracks.

== Career ==
After moving to Chicago in 1985 to live with his father, Gerber started playing at punk club Batteries Not Included where older performers would refer to him as Junior, which he adopted as his stage name. In 1986 Junior formed The Mystery Girls with Scott Giampino and Tom Faulkner. They changed their name to The Rosehips in 1992 and in 1994 released debut album Soul Veronique in Parchment.

Junior had become friendly with former Swell Maps members Nikki Sudden and Epic Soundtracks, and in 1994 put together a band to promote Soundtracks album Sleeping Star. In 1996 Junior assisted Soundtracks to record Good Things which was released posthumously in 2005. Junior toured with both Soundtracks and Sudden in Europe.

Upon returning from Europe Junior began recording what would become the first Chamber Strings album Gospel Morning. The recording process was challenging and the resulting album was released in an initial run of 1000 copies by Idiot Savant Music in 1997. The album was well received and was picked up by Bobsled Records for wider release.

The second Chamber Strings album Month of Sundays expanded the sonic pallet of Gospel Morning with a horn section and more intricate arrangements and is considered to be Junior's masterpiece.

Following the death of Epic Soundtracks, Junior struggled with depression and addiction which eventually led to the disbanding of The Chamber Strings and a period of homelessness and health issues. After cleaning up, Junior eventually reconnected with The Chamber Strings and began working on new material.

In 2009 Ruins, a compilation of outtakes and rarities featuring all of Junior's bands was released.

Junior died on January 16, 2016, following surgery for ongoing heart problems.

== Discography ==
=== Mystery Girls (1986-1992) ===
- Mystery Girls (Album, CD, 1991, Delta Recording Company)
- It’s Not Worth Fighting For (Single, 7”, 1993, Jangle Town Records)

=== The Rosehips (1992-1995) ===
- Soul Veronique In Parchment (Album, CD, 1994, Red Dog Music Group, Inc.)

=== The Chamber Strings (1996-2011) ===
- Gospel Morning (Album, LP/CD, 1997/1999 (Reissue) /2020 (Reissue), Idiot Savant Music, Bobsled Records (Reissue), Pravda Records (Reissue))
- Month of Sundays (Album, LP/CD, 2001/2001 (Reissue), Bobsled Records, Cutting Edge (Japan Reissue))
- I Come Apart (A Tragic Comedy) (Single, 7”, 2009, Avec Vinyl)

=== Kevin Junior & Hushdrops ===
- Kevin Junior (track from Hushdrops Volume One, CD, 2004, Subspace Platform Recording SPR1002)

=== Kevin Junior ===
- Ruins (A Collection Of Rarities, B-sides & Outtakes) (Compilation Album, CD, 2009, Sunthunder Records/Hanky Panky Records)

=== Kevin Junior & Los Tupper ===
- Si Minor Seventh (Extended Play, 7”/CD, 2016, Sunthunder Records)
