= Melon (band) =

- Origin: New York
- Genres: New wave, post-punk, synthpop, funk
- Years active: 1980s
- Past members: Chica Sato; Gota Yashiki; Prince Kudou; Toshio Nakanishi

Melon was a group formed by former Plastics members Toshio Nakanishi and Chica Sato. When Plastics broke up in 1982, Toshio and Sato went to New York City and formed Melon with friends Percy Jones of Brand X, Dougie Bowne of The Lounge Lizards, and Bernie Worrell of Funkadelic, trying to merge funk with Japanese and became known as a quirky, exotic, pop band. Chica's appearances in Toshi's projects since Melon have dwindled, but Toshio continues collaborating music acts, changing sounds and names: Tycoon To$h, Group of Gods, Love T.K.O., Major Force and Skylab being some of the most often used.

== Discography ==
=== Albums ===
- Do You Like Japan? (1982) Alfa Records
- Do The Pithecan - Happy Age (1984) (12", Pin) Fuzz Dance Records
- Deep Cut (1987) Epic Records
- Hardcore Hawaiian (1987) Epic Records
- Shinjuku Bladerunner (1987) Alfa Records, Inc.
- Do You Like Japan? (2005, rerelease) Sony Music Direct (Japan) Inc.

=== Singles ===
- "Serious Japanese" (1985) Ten Records Ltd. (10 Records)
- "The Gate of Japonesia" (1987) Epic Records
