= Marina Records =

Record label

Marina Records is a German record label started in 1993 and specialising in indie pop. Acts include Ashby, Pearlfishers, Cowboy Mouth (the Grahame Skinner band, not the better-known American act) and The Bathers.

Marina has also released albums by such acts as Paul Quinn & The Independent Group, Shack (the "lost" Waterpistol album) and Josef K

== Discography/Catalogue ==
- Gazelle - Better Days 1993
- The Bathers - Lagoon Blues 1993
- Gazelle - Better Days 1994
- Eight Miles High - Triple Pulse 1994
- Gazelle - Time Will Tell 1994
- Gazelle - Everything Inside 1994
- Paul Quinn & The Independent Group - Will I Ever Be Inside of You 1994
- Cowboy Mouth - Life As A Dog 1995
- Sugartown - Swimming In The Horsespool 1995
- Cowboy Mouth - My Life As A Dog EP 1995
- Various Artists - From Marina With Love 1995
- The Bathers - Sunpowder 1995
- Marina T-Shirt - Music Is Love T-Shirt 1995
- Malcolm Ross - Low Shot 1995
- Camping - Maritime Strick- und Regenmoden 1995
- Shack - Waterpistol 1995
- Cowboy Mouth - Love Is Dead 1995
- Cowboy Mouth - Sugartown EP 1996
- The Secret Goldfish - Aqua-Pet...You Make Me 1996
- Mindstore - Lightening The Load 1996
- Various Artists - In Bed With Marina 1996
- The Bathers - Kelvingrove Baby 1997
- Mindstore - Double Sided Walk EP 1997
- Adventures In Stereo - Adventures In Stereo 1997
- The Pearlfishers - The Strange Underworld Of The Tall Poppies 1997
- The Secret Goldfish - Jet Streams 1997
- The Pearlfishers - Even On A Sunday Afternoon EP 1997
- Mindstore - PC Streets EP 1997
- Jazzateers - Here Comes That Feeling 1997
- Jazzateers - I Shot The President 1997
- Sugartown - Slow Flows The River 1997
- Various Artists - Songs For Marshmallow Lovers 1997
- Malcolm Ross - Happy Boy 1998
- Die Moulinettes - 20 Blumen 1998
- The Pearlfishers - Banana Sandwich EP 1998
- Die Moulinettes - Herr Rossi Sucht Das Glueck EP 1998
- The Pale Fountains - Longshot For Your Love 1998
- Adventures In Stereo - Alternative Stereo Sounds 1998
- Peter Thomas - Moonflowers and Mini-Skirts 1998
- Josef K - Endless Soul 1998
- Peter Thomas - Opium 12" EP 1998
- The Pearlfishers - The Young Picnickers 1999
- Paula - Glueck Und Aerger EP 1999
- June & The Exit Wounds - A Little More Haven Hamilton, Please 2000
- Paula - Als Es Passiert EP 2000
- The Aluminum Group - Introducing... 2000
- Paula - Himmelfahrt 2000
- Paula - Jimmy EP 2000
- Various Artists - Caroline Now! 2000
- Paula - Jimmy/Als Es Passierte EP 2000
- The Free Design - Cosmic Peekaboo 2001
- The Pearlfishers - Across The Milky Way 2001
- Ashby - Power Ballads 2001
- Roddy Frame - Surf 2002
- Peter Thomas - Moonflowers & Mini-Skirts 2003
- James Kirk - You Can Make It If You Boogie 2003
- The Pearlfishers - Sky Meadows 2003
- Benjamin v. Stuckrad-Barre - Autodiscographie 2003
- Various Artists - Ave Marina - Ten Years of Marina Records 2004
- Der Plan - Die Verschwörung 2004
- The Magic Circles - Meet Me In Milan EP 2004
- The Pearlfishers - A Sunflower at Christmas 2004
- Ashby - Looks Like You've Already Won 2005
- The Pearlfishers - The Young Picnickers + Bonus Tracks 2005
- Various Artists - The In-Kraut 2005
- Various Artists - The In-Kraut - Vol. 2 2006
- Various Artists - Goosebumps - 25 Years Of Marina Records 2018

== See also ==
- List of record labels
