= Françoise Cactus =

French writer and singer

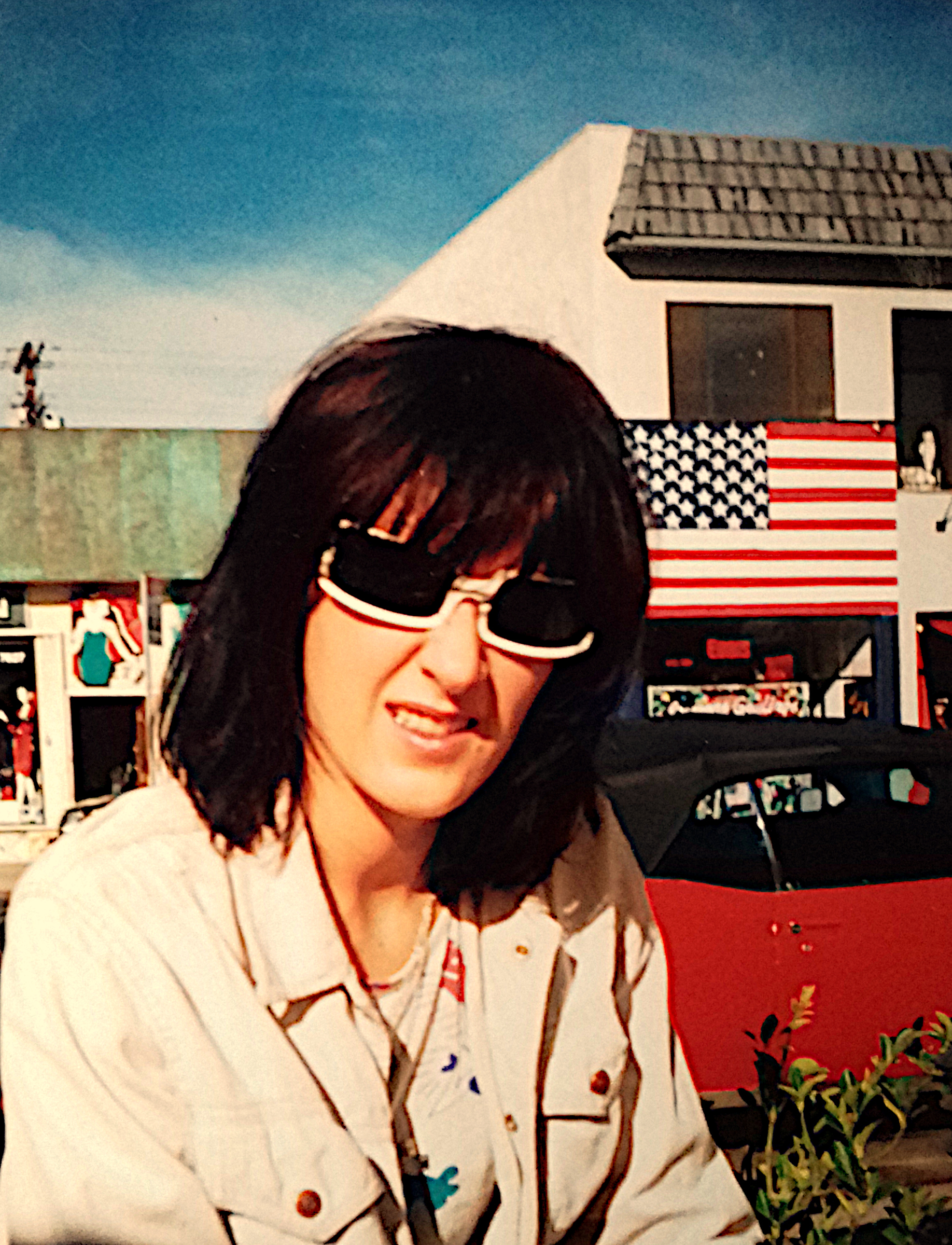

Background information
- Born: Françoise van Hove; 5 May 1964
- Died: 17 February 2021 (aged 56) Berlin, Germany
- Occupations: Musician; Author
- Formerly of: Stereo Total; Les Lolitas

Françoise Cactus (5 May 1964 – 17 February 2021), born Françoise van Hove, was a French musician and author, active in Berlin, Germany, best known as co-founder, vocalist, and multi-instrumentalist in the band Stereo Total. Cactus wrote several novels as well as contributing to German papers such as Die Tageszeitung.

== Biography ==
Originally from France, Cactus moved to West Berlin in 1985 and played in the West Berlin band Les Lolitas with co-founder marquis de Coco Nut. They were one of only a few Western bands to play officially unsanctioned gigs in East Berlin during the final years of the dictatorship.

Françoise Cactus died aged 56 on 17 February 2021 in her Berlin home after having suffered from breast cancer. She is buried in Berlin.

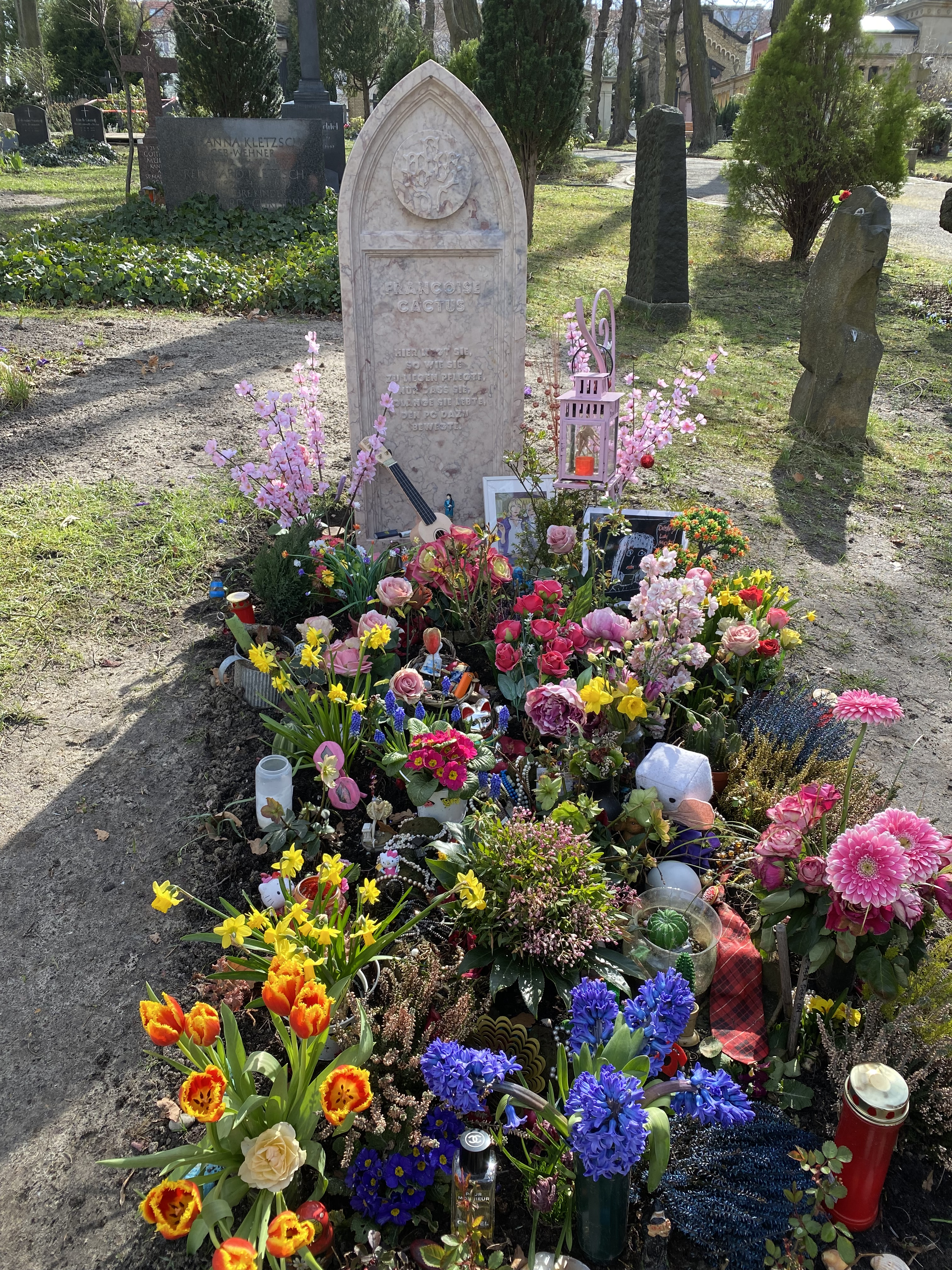
Grave of singer Francoise Cactus

== Radio plays ==
- Weill jagt Fantômas (Oliver Augst/Cactus/Göring), Radio Berlin-Brandenburg, Radio France Culture 2018
- Alle Toten 1914 (Oliver Augst/John Birke), Deutschlandfunk Kultur, Rundfunk Berlin-Brandenburg, Volksbühne Berlin, Hessischer Rundfunk 2014 - participation as speaker, singer, musician
- City of the thousand fires (Augst/Birke), Hessischer Rundfunk/Südwestrundfunk 2012 - participation as speaker, singer
