= Juke-Box Alarm =

Studio album by Stereo Total
- Released: 1998
- Genre: Electronic
- Label: Bungalow

Stereo Total chronology
Stereo Total (1998)	Juke-Box Alarm (1998)	My Melody (1999)

Juke-Box Alarm is Stereo Total's third album released in 1998.

== Track listing ==
1. "Holiday Inn" - 2.33
2. "Comicstripteasegirl" - 1.41
3. "Sweet Charlotte" - 1.31
4. "Touche-Moi" - 2.23
5. "Crazy Horse" - 2.57
6. "Supercool" - 3.34
7. "Les Minets" - 3.34
8. "Oh Yeah" - 1.24
9. "Film D'Horreur" - 1.46
10. "Vertigo" - 2.02
11. "Heaven's In The Back Seat Of My Cadillac" - 2.50
12. "Der Schlüssel" - 2.20
13. "Nouvelle Vague" - 1.36
14. "Party Anticonformiste" - 2.12
15. "Holiday Out" - 2.56
16. Untitled - 1.41

Professional ratings
Review scores
Source	Rating
Allmusic	3/5 stars
