= ...The Corner of Miles and Gil =

Studio album by Shack
- Released: 15 May 2006
- Studios: Highfield Street Studios, Liverpool
- Genre: Alternative Rock
- Length: 52:53
- Label: Sour Mash
- Producers: Shack, David "Yorkie" Palmer

Shack chronology
| Here's Tom with the Weather (2003) | ...The Corner of Miles and Gil (2006) |

Professional ratings
Review scores
| Source | Rating |
|---|---|
| AllMusic | 4.5/5 stars |

...The Corner of Miles and Gil is the fifth and, to date, final album by English alternative rock band Shack, released in 2006. While the album was not a high seller, only reaching number 55 on the UK Albums Chart, it was critically acclaimed.

The album was released on Noel Gallagher's Sour Mash label, and the band supported Oasis on live dates in 2006 promoting the album.

The album's title was a reference to the musical partnership between Miles Davis and Gil Evans, a cited influence of Michael Head's music.

== Track listing ==
All songs written by Mick Head except when noted.

1. "Tie Me Down" - 3:33
2. "Butterfly" (John Head) - 4:50
3. "Cup of Tea" - 3:35
4. "Shelley Brown" - 4:25
5. "Black & White" - 5:13
6. "New Day" (John Head) - 3:54
7. "Miles Away" - 5:31
8. "Finn, Sophie, Bobby & Lance" - 4:18
9. "Moonshine" (John Head) - 4:02
10. "Funny Things" - 2:21
11. "Find a Place" (John Head) - 5:47
12. "Closer" - 5:24

== Personnel ==
Shack

- Mick Head - acoustic guitar, vocals
- John Head - electric guitar, vocals
- Peter Wilkinson - bass guitar, vocals
- Iain Templeton - drums, percussion, vocals

with:

- David "Yorkie" Palmer - keyboards, synthesizer, arrangements
- Tim O'Shea - guitar (track 11)
- Simon Wolstonecroft - bass guitar (tracks 1,2,5–7,12)
- Simon James - tenor and baritone saxophone, flute, recorder (tracks 9,10)
- Andy Frizell - alto and baritone saxophone, alto flute (tracks 9,10)
- Gillian Bould - trombone (tracks 1,2,5–7,12)
- Alan Bould - horn (tracks 1,2,5–7,12)
- Barry Taylor - euphonium (tracks 1,2,5–7,12)
- Alex Marks, Celia Goodwin - violin (tracks 1,4,5,7,11,12)
- John Robert Shepley - viola (tracks 1,4,5,7,11,12)
- Gethyn Jones - cello (tracks 1,4,5,7,11,12)
- Alan Rimmer, John O'Hare - cornet (tracks 1,2,5–7,12)
- Joanna Head - backing vocals (track 4)
- The Light Fantastic String Quartet - strings (tracks 1,4,5,7,11,12)
- The Tartleton & District Brass Band - brass (tracks 1,2,5–7,12)
