= Do the Bambi =

Studio album by Stereo Total
- Released: 25 February 2005
- Genre: Electronic
- Label: Disko B

Stereo Total chronology
Musique Automatique (2001)	Do the Bambi (2005)	Discotheque (2005)

Do the Bambi is Stereo Total's 7th album, released in 2005.

== Track listing ==
1. Babystrich - 2.43
2. Do The Bambi - 3.23
3. Ich Bin Nackt - 2.39
4. Cinémania - 2.27
5. Vive Le Week-End - 2.49
6. Das Erste Mal - 3.47
7. La Douce Humanité - 3.23
8. Les Lapins - 2.23
9. Hunger! - 2.51
10. Ne M'Appelle Pas Ta Biche - 1.53
11. Orange Mécanique - 2.43
12. Tas De Tôle - 2.55
13. Europa Neurotisch - 2.32
14. Partymädchen Gefoltert - 1.57
15. Cannibale - 2.49
16. Helft Mir - 2.36
17. Mars Rendezvous - 3.51
18. Troglodyten - 2.55
19. Chelsea Girls - 3.00

Professional ratings
Review scores
Source	Rating
Allmusic	4/5 stars
Pitchfork Media	(6.4/10.0)
