= Jim Beattie (musician) =

- Also known as: Jim Navajo
- Genres: Indie pop, alternative rock, electronic
- Occupations: Musician, songwriter
- Instruments: Guitar, keyboards
- Years active: 1982–present
- Labels: Creation, Elevation, 4AD, Creeping Bent

James Robertson Beattie is a Scottish musician who co-founded Primal Scream and later went on to form Spirea X and Adventures in Stereo.

== Biography ==
Beattie formed Primal Scream in 1982 along with Bobby Gillespie. Beattie and Gillespie were the core members of the band until Beattie left after the release of the band's debut album, Sonic Flower Groove in 1987, thus seeing the band taking a more rock-oriented direction and their relocation to Brighton. During his tenure with the band Beattie wrote "Velocity Girl", which was included on the NME's C86 compilation. Beattie formed Spirea X with girlfriend Judith Boyle in 1988, the band named after a Primal Scream B-side. Spirea X split up in 1993, and Beattie and Boyle went on to form Adventures in Stereo with Simon Dine. In 2019, Beattie briefly reunited with Primal Scream for a one off performance in Glasgow.

== Discography ==
=== with Primal Scream ===
==== Albums ====
- Sonic Flower Groove (1987), Elevation – UK No. 62

==== Singles ====
- "All Fall Down" (1985), Creation
- "Crystal Crescent" (1986), Creation
- "Gentle Tuesday" (1987), Elevation
- "Imperial" (1987), Elevation

=== with Spirea X ===
see Spirea X#Discography

=== with Adventures in Stereo ===
see Adventures in Stereo#Discography
