= Adventures in Stereo =

Scottish indie pop band

- Origin: Glasgow, Scotland
- Genres: Indie pop, lo-fi, electronic
- Years active: 1994–2000
- Labels: Creeping Bent, Marina, Bobsled
- Past members: Jim Beattie; Judith Boyle; Simon Dine; Gayle Harrison; Brian Doherty; David McClusky; Morag Brown; Pamela Cobb; Brad Cunningham

Adventures in Stereo were a band from Glasgow, Scotland, formed by Primal Scream founding member Jim Beattie in 1994, after his previous band, Spirea X, split up.

== History ==
After Spirea X split up in 1993, former members Jim Beattie and Judith Boyle resurfaced in 1994 with Adventures in Stereo, along with Simon Dine, who had been Spirea X's manager and co-producer. The band initially used music based on sampled loops created by Dine, but later moved to a lo-fi sound more akin to early Primal Scream than their previous band, with a Beach Boys influence, and have been compared to Stereolab and Broadcast. Beattie and Boyle split with Dine after the first few releases, initially with Dine also continuing with the Adventures in Stereo name for his own work, including the Yellow Album, released the same year as Beattie and Boyle's self-titled album, recorded with new collaborators. Beattie and Boyle continued with the name until 2000, with 2 further albums and a few singles. Dine, meanwhile, formed Noonday Underground.

The band recorded a 1997 session for John Peel's radio show.

== Discography ==
=== Singles/EPs ===
- "The Attic Walk" (1996, Kinglake Records)
- "Airline" (1996, Creeping Bent)
- "When We Go Back" (1996, Creeping Bent)
- "Theme E / Waves On" – The Leopards / Adventures in Stereo (1997, Creeping Bent – limited edition split 7-inch single)
- "A Brand New Day" (1997, Creeping Bent)
- "After Hours Issue #2" – Adventures in Stereo / The American Analog Set (1997, After Hours – split 7-inch single)
- "Down in the Traffic" (1998, Creeping Bent)
- "International" (2000, Bobsled)

=== Albums ===
- Adventures in Stereo (1997, Creeping Bent – compilation of first 3 singles)
- Yellow Album (1997, Underground Sounds – a bootleg release of Spirea X demos)
- Alternative Stereo Sounds (1998, Marina)
- Monomania (2000, Bobsled)
