= H.M.S. Fable =

Studio album by Shack
- Released: 21 June 1999
- Studios: Townhouse; Rockfield; Ridge Farm; Westside; Britannia Row; Chapel; Lansdowne
- Genres: Alternative rock, Britpop
- Length: 47:02
- Label: London
- Producers: Hugh Jones, Youth

Shack chronology
Waterpistol (1995)	H.M.S. Fable (1999)	Here's Tom with the Weather (2003)

Singles from H.M.S. Fable
- 1. "Comedy" Released: 21 June 1999; 2. "Natalie's Party" Released: 9 August 1999

Professional ratings
Review scores
Source	Rating
AllMusic	4/5 stars
Encyclopedia of Popular Music	4/5 stars
The Great Rock Discography	9/10
NME	9/10
Pitchfork	6.8/10
PopMatters	8.8/10
Q	4/5 stars
Rolling Stone	3/5 stars
Select	4/5
Uncut	8/10

H.M.S. Fable is the third album by Liverpudlian band Shack, released in June 1999 via London Records. It was the band's first album following their reformation after the interest generated by their previous much-delayed album Waterpistol and the album by offshoot band The Strands. H.M.S. Fable was well received by the critics: among the UK music publications, the album was placed at number 2 on both the NME and Uncut critics' poll of the albums of the year for 1999, and number 5 in Select magazine.

== Legacy ==
The album was included in the book 1001 Albums You Must Hear Before You Die. NME placed the album as number 332 on their 2013 list of the 500 greatest albums of all time.

== Track listing ==
All tracks are written by Michael Head, except where indicated.

No.	Title	Writer(s)	Length
1.	"Natalie's Party"		3:50
2.	"Comedy"		5:27
3.	"Pull Together"	Michael Head, John Head	3:33
4.	"Beautiful"	John Head	3:22
5.	"Lend's Some Dough"		3:51
6.	"Captain's Table"		4:14
7.	"Streets of Kenny"		3:52
8.	"Reinstated"		3:54
9.	"I Want You"		4:06
10.	"Cornish Town"	John Head	3:59
11.	"Since I Met You"		3:16
12.	"Daniella"		3:31

== Personnel ==
=== Shack ===
- Michael Head – vocals, acoustic guitar
- John Head – electric guitar, vocals, Hammond organ on "Cornish Town"
- Ren Parry – bass
- Iain Templeton – drums, percussion, backing vocals

=== Additional musicians ===
- Michelle Brown – bass on "Comedy", "Lend's Some Dough" and "Captain's Table"
- Martin Duffy – piano on "Lend’s Some Dough"
- The Kick Horns (Roddy Lorimer and Paul Spong) – trumpets and horns on "Reinstated" and "Since I Met You"
- Richard Payne – Hammond organ on "Reinstated"; celeste on "Since I Met You"
- Anne Woods – violin on "Streets of Kenny"
