= The In-Kraut, Vol 1. =

The In-Kraut

Compilation album by Various Artists
- Released: November 8, 2005
- Recorded: 1966–1974
- Genres: Pop; Psychedelic pop Sunshine pop Baroque pop
- Label: Marina MA66
- Producers: Stefan Kassel, Frank Lähnemann, Frank Jastfelder

The In-Kraut chronology
The In-Kraut (2005)	The In-Kraut, Vol. 2 (2006)

Professional ratings
Review scores
Source	Rating
AllMusic	link
Dusted Magazine	link
Foxy Digitalis	link
Igloo Magazine	positive link
Now Magazine	link
The Other Music	link
PopMatters	link

The In-Kraut: Hip Shaking Grooves Made in Germany 1966-1974 is the first volume in The In-Kraut series released by Marina Records on compact disc and double vinyl in 2005.

The album is a collection of obscuro German pop rarities, collected from various soundtracks and singles by artists who never intended to have their music released outside Germany. It was followed by The In-Kraut, Vol. 2 in 2006.

== Track listing ==
1. "From Here On it Got Rough" (Hildegard Knef) – 2:38
2. "Gemini" (Günter Noris) – 2:54
3. "Marihuana Mantra" (Kuno & The Marihuana Brass) – 2:34
4. "Why Don't You PLay The Organ, Man" (Memphis Black) – 2:38
5. "An Unknown Quantity" (Bill Ramsey & The Jay Five) – 2:28
6. "Sunday Love Affair" (Orchester Frank Pleyer) – 2:40
7. "Wie A Glock'n..." (Marianne Mendt) – 2:51
8. "Beat It" (Fredy Brock) – 3:06
9. "Hippie Hippie" (France Gall) – 2:41
10. "Jumpin' Jack Flash" (Peter Thomas Sound Orchestra) – 2:30
11. "Berlin" (Heidi Brühl) – 3:11
12. "Das Stundenhotel Von St. Pauli" (Erwin Halletz) – 1:33
13. "Molotow Cocktail Party" (Vivi Bach & Dietmar Schönherr) – 2:32
14. "Naturally Stoned" (Helmut Zacharias) – 2:31
15. "Alexander" (The Boots) – 2:10
16. "Bodybuilding" (Orchester Werner Müller) – 3:22
17. "Jungle Soul" (Johannes Fehring & the ORF Big Band) – 2:50
18. "Pussy Baby" (Bill Lawrence) – 2:54
19. "Moving Out" (Orchester Helmuth Brandenburg) – 3:37
20. "Undergroovin'" (Eugen Thomass) – 3:09
