= No Controles (album) =

Studio album by Stereo Total
- Released: 2009
- Genre: Electronic
- Label: Elefant

Stereo Total chronology
Paris<>Berlin (2007)	No Controles (2009)	Baby ouh! (2010)

No Controles is Stereo Total's 9th album released in 2009.

== Track listing ==
1. "No Controles"
2. "Amo Amor A Tres"
3. "Voy A Ser Mamá"
4. "Todo El Mundo En La Discoteca"
5. "Bailamos En Cuadrado"
6. "El Chico De Anoche"
7. "Plástico"
8. "Más Menos Cero"
9. "Bonito Por Atrás"
10. "Lolita Fantôme"
11. "Holiday Innn"
12. "Tócame"
13. "Complejo Con El Sexo"
14. "Miau Miau (Gato Salvaje)"
15. "C'est Fini"
