= Paris-Berlin =

Paris<>Berlin

Studio album by Stereo Total
- Released: 2007
- Genre: Electronic
- Label: Disko B

Stereo Total chronology
Discotheque (2006)	Paris<>Berlin (2007)	No Controles (2009)

Paris<>Berlin is Stereo Total's 8th album released in 2007.

== Track listing ==
1. "Miss Rébellion Des Hormones" – 3.12
2. "Ich Bin Der Stricherjunge" – 2.07
3. "Plastic" – 2.52
4. "Komplex Mit Dem Sex" – 2.45
5. "Lolita Fantôme" – 3.21
6. "Küsse Aus Der Hölle Der Musik" – 2.26 (The US edition features «Baisers de l’enfer de la musique» instead of «Küsse aus der Hölle der Musik».
7. "Plus Minus Null" – 2.01
8. "Mehr Licht" – 3.15
9. "Ta Voix Au Téléphone" – 2.59
10. "Patty Hearst" – 2.40
11. "Baby Revolution" – 3.28
12. "Relax Baby Be Cool" – 2.32
13. "Chewinggum" – 2.33
14. "Moderne Musik" – 2.16

Professional ratings
Review scores
Source	Rating
Allmusic	4/5 stars
Pitchfork Media	(8.0/10.0)
