= Baby ouh! =

Studio album by Stereo Total
- Released: 2010
- Genre: Electronic
- Label: Disko B

Stereo Total chronology
No Controles (2009)	Baby ouh! (2010)

Baby ouh is Stereo Total's 10th album. It was released on March 26 in Europe (Disko B) and on 4 May 2010 in the USA (Kill Rock Stars).

Professional ratings
Review scores
Source	Rating
Allmusic	4/5 stars

== Track listing ==
1. Hallo Damenklo - 2:19 (The US edition includes an English version of «Hallo Damenklo» called «Hello Ladies»)
2. Alaska - 2:46
3. Divine's Handbag - 2:27
4. Andy Warhol - 3:37
5. Barbe à Papa - 3:01 (cover of the Brigitte Fontaine song)
6. No Controles - 2:36 (cover of the Ole Ole song)
7. Du Bist Gut Zu Vögeln - 2:52
8. I Wanna Be a Mama - 2:32 (cover of the Almodovar and McNamara's song)
9. Babyboom Ohne Mich - 2:04
10. Lady Dandy - 2:24
11. Illégal - 2:54 (cover of the Corbeau song)
12. Wenn Ich ein Junge Wär - 1:52
13. Tour de France - 2:48
14. Larmes de Métal - 2:33 (cover of the Soupir song)
15. Elles Te Bottent, Mes Bottes? - 2:36
16. Baby Ouh - 5:07
17. Radio Song - 3:27 (The US edition includes «Violent Love» instead of «Radio Song»)
