= Here's Tom with the Weather =

...here's tom with the weather

Studio album by Shack
- Released: 2 September 2003
- Recorded: May–June 2003
- Studios: Bryn Derwen Studios, Bethesda, Wales
- Genre: Alternative rock
- Length: 48:24
- Label: North Country Records
- Producers: Michael Head, John Head and Jay Reynolds

Shack chronology
H.M.S. Fable (1999)	...here's tom with the weather (2003)	...The Corner of Miles and Gil (2006)

Here's Tom with the Weather (stylized as ...here's tom with the weather) is Liverpool band Shack's fourth studio album, which reached number 55 in the UK charts when it was released in 2003.

The album's chief songwriter Mick Head wrote 10 of the 13 songs on the album, with his brother John Head writing the remaining 3 songs. Michael Head appeared on the cover of the NME in October 1999 billed as "our greatest songwriter".

The album was named after a quote by US comedian Bill Hicks:

“Today a young man on acid realized that all matter is merely energy condensed to a slow vibration, that we are all one consciousness experiencing itself subjectively, there is no such thing as death, life is only a dream, and we are the imagination of ourselves. Here's Tom with the weather.”

The album was recorded at Bryn Derwen studios in Bethesda, Wales, during May and June 2003, and featured cover photography by Harry Ainscough, known for his photographs from the 1960s and 1970s of inner cities in the north of England.

The album received largely positive reviews, following the critical acclaim of Shack's previous outing, HMS Fable, which was released in 1999. The BBC stated, "Shack are back and in exquisite form, even if initially they do sound slightly muted."

The Guardian and AllMusic both rated the album 4/5 stars.

The album was toured during 2003, and lead single "Byrds Turn to Stone" was released in October 2003. The single reached number 63 in the UK charts.

== Track listing ==
1	As Long as I've Got You
2	Soldier Man
3	Byrds Turn to Stone
4	The Girl with the Long Brown Hair
5	On the Terrace
6	Miles Apart
7	Meant to Be
8	Carousel
9	On the Streets Tonight
10	Chinatown
11	Kilburn High Road
12	Happy Everafter

All songs were written by Michael Head except tracks 6, 8, and 11, written by John Head. All tracks produced by Michael Head, John Head and Jay Reynolds.

== Personnel ==
Michael Head	vocals, acoustic guitar
John Head	vocals, acoustic guitar, electric guitar
Iain Templeton	drums, backing vocals
Guy Rigby	bass
Jean Francis	keyboards
Martin Smith	trumpet
