= Spirea X =

Scottish alternative rock band

- Origin: Glasgow, Scotland
- Genres: Alternative rock
- Years active: 1990–1993
- Label: 4AD
- Past members: Jim Beattie; Judith Boyle; Andy Kerr; Thomas McGurk; Jamie O'Donnell

Spirea X were a Scottish alternative rock band from Glasgow, Scotland, formed by Primal Scream founding member Jim Beattie in 1990.

== History ==
After six years in the band, Jim Beattie left Primal Scream in 1988. Two years later he formed Spirea X, the name taken from a Primal Scream b-side (an instrumental track that he had written), announcing "We're going to do it...by having better songs, better melodies, better arrangements, better everything. By sheer force of ideas". The band's first demo prompted 4AD to sign them, their first release eagerly anticipated, with BBC Two's Snub TV featuring an interview with them and a couple of live tracks before they had released a single. The band's original bass player and guitarist (The McGovern brothers) soon left, with guitarist Robert forming cult underground Glasgow punk band Dresden and his bass playing brother Tony becoming a well established member of Glasgow band Texas. Jamie O'Donnell and Thomas McGurk joining Beattie, his girlfriend Judith Boyle, and Andy Kerr in 1991. Debut EP Chlorine Dream was released in April 1991, the title track inspired by the life of Brian Jones. This was followed up by "Speed Reaction" and the album Fireblade Skies (the name taken from a volume of Arthur Rimbaud's poetry), both in 1991. Fireblade Skies met with positive critical reaction, Lime Lizard's Nick Terry stating: "If Jim Beattie's last longplaying endeavour, Primal Scream's Sonic Flower Groove, was a thoroughly flawed masterpiece, he's found his groove with Fireblade Skies". Beattie was known for his self-confidence, verging on arrogance, once proclaiming himself to be God, and stating "David Icke is my bestest friend", later saying "Yeah, I thought I was God before, but now I feel more like Jesus". Beattie rejected comparisons with other bands of the era, stating "I don't think we fit in anywhere, really", and "I don't think we're egotistical like Ride are. I don't need to be egotistical, because I've got the music to back it up".

The band was subsequently reduced to a duo of Beattie and Boyle, and were dropped by 4AD in 1992, the band splitting the following year.

Beattie and Boyle resurfaced in 1994 with a new band, Adventures in Stereo.

== Discography ==
=== Albums ===
- Fireblade Skies (28 October 1991) 4AD, CAD 1017
  - Released on 4AD in the US on 23 June 1992 with new artwork and different track listing

UK track listing

  1. "Rollercoaster"
  2. "Chlorine Dream"
  3. "Fire and Light"
  4. "Spirea 9"
  5. "Speed Reaction"
  6. "Confusion in My Soul"
  7. "Signed D.C." (Arthur Lee cover)
  8. "Sisters and Brothers"
  9. "Sunset Dawn"
  10. "Smile"
  11. "Nothing Happened Yesterday"

US track listing

  1. "Smile"
  2. "Nothing Happened Yesterday"
  3. "Rollercoaster"
  4. "Chlorine Dream"
  5. "Fire and Light"
  6. "Spirea 9"
  7. "Speed Reaction"
  8. "Confusion in My Soul"
  9. "Signed D.C."
  10. "Sisters and Brothers"
  11. "Sunset Dawn"
  12. "Spirea Rising"

=== Singles/EPs ===
- Chlorine Dream (8 April 1991) 4AD, BAD 1004
  1. "Chlorine Dream"
  2. "Spirea Rising"
  3. "Risk"
- Speed Reaction (20 May 1991) 4AD, BAD 1006
  1. "Speed Reaction"
  2. "What Kind of Love"
  3. "Jet Pilot"
  4. "Re: Action"
