= The Pale Fountains =

English pop/new wave band

- Origin: Liverpool, England
- Genres: Pop; jangle pop; new wave
- Years active: 1981–1987, 2008
- Labels: Operation Twilight; Les Disques du Crépuscule; Virgin
- Spinoffs: Shack
- Past members: Mick Head; Chris McCaffery; Thomas Whelan; Andy Diagram; John Head; Ken Moss

The Pale Fountains were an English band formed in Liverpool in 1980, and composed of Mick Head (vocalist/guitarist), Chris McCaffery (bassist), Thomas Whelan (drummer), trumpet player Andy Diagram (horns) and Ken Moss (guitarist). Diagram was simultaneously a member of Dislocation Dance for most of the Pale Fountains' existence.

== Career ==
Inspired by 1960s music such as Love, Burt Bacharach and the Beatles, the group released their debut single "(There's Always) Something on My Mind" on Les Disques du Crépuscule before signing a major label deal in October 1982. Although the Pale Fountains failed to make much commercial headway, the band would earn critical praise for the two albums released on Virgin, Pacific Street (1984) and ...From Across the Kitchen Table (1985), produced by Ian Broudie, who later found fame with the Lightning Seeds. Their sole UK Singles Chart top 50 single was "Thank You", which reached No. 48 in 1982.

The band split up in 1987, with Mick Head going on to form Shack with his brother John. Andy Diagram had already left in 1984 and would later join James. Bassist and founder member Chris "Biffa" McCaffery died in 1989 of a brain tumour.

In November 2007, Head announced that he was reforming the Pale Fountains for two gigs; one at the Carling Academy in Liverpool on 2 February 2008, and another at the Shepherd's Bush Empire in London on 3 February 2008. The group remains particularly popular in France and Japan. Two compilations have been issued: Longshot for Your Love (Marina, 1998) and Something on My Mind (Crépuscule, 2013), the latter with a bonus live CD recorded in 1982.

== Members ==
- Mick Head – vocals, guitar (1981–1987)
- Chris McCaffery – bass guitar (1981–1987; died 1989)
- Thomas Whelan – drums (1981–1987)
- Andy Diagram – trumpet (1982–1984)
- John Head – guitar (1984–1987)

== Discography ==
=== Albums ===
==== Studio albums ====
Title	Album details	Peak chart positions
Title	Album details	UK
Pacific Street	Released: 27 February 1984; Label: Virgin; Formats: LP, MC	85
...From Across the Kitchen Table	Released: 4 February 1985; Label: Virgin; Formats: LP, MC	94

==== Compilation albums ====
Title	Album details
Longshot for Your Love	Released: 15 May 1998; Label: Marina; Formats: CD, LP; Germany-only release
Something on My Mind	Released: 9 December 2013; Label: Les Disques du Crépuscule; Formats: LP+CD, digital download

=== Singles ===
Title	Year	Peak chart positions		
Title	Year	UK	UK Indie	NL
"(There's Always) Something on My Mind" / "Just a Girl"	1982	—	28; 25	—
"Thank You"	1982	48	—	48
"Palm of My Hand"	1983	102	—	—
"Unless"	1984	115	—	—
"(Don't Let Your Love) Start a War"	1984	174	—	—
"Jean's Not Happening"	1984	—	—	—
"...From Across the Kitchen Table"	1985	—	—	—
"—" denotes releases that did not chart or were not released in that territory.

== See also ==
- Shack
- Michael Head & The Red Elastic Band
