= Monokini (album) =

Studio album by Stereo Total
- Released: 1997
- Genre: Electronic
- Label: Bungalow Record

Stereo Total chronology
| Oh Ah! (1995) | Monokini (1997) | Stereo Total (1998) |

Monokini is Stereo Total's second album released in 1997.

== Track listing ==
1. "Ach Ach Liebling" – 1.58
2. "Lunatique" – 2.13
3. "Supergirl" – 2.32
4. "Furore" – 2.53
5. "Schön Von Hinten" – 2.50
6. "Dilindam" – 2.36
7. "Cosmonaute" – 3.02
8. "Aua" – 2.04
9. "Und Wer Wird Sich Um Mich Kümmern?" – 1.54
10. "Tu M'As Voulue" – 2.10
11. "Moustique" – 2.23
12. "La, Ca, USA" – 1.49
13. "L'Appareil A Sous" – 2.04
14. "Grand Prix Eurovision" – 4.15
15. "Ushilo Sugata Ga Kilei" – 3.19

Professional ratings
Review scores
| Source | Rating |
|---|---|
| Allmusic | 3.5/5 stars |
