= Waterpistol (album) =

Studio album by Shack
- Released: 16 October 1995
- Recorded: 1991
- Genres: Alternative rock, Britpop
- Length: 51:05
- Label: Marina
- Producer: Chris Allison

Shack chronology
Zilch (1988)	Waterpistol (1995)	H.M.S. Fable (1999)

Alternative cover
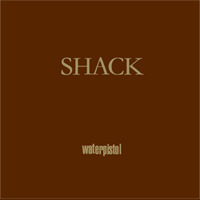
- 2007 reissue

Waterpistol is the second studio album by the English alternative rock band Shack. The album was recorded in 1991, but its release was delayed due to a studio fire which destroyed the master tapes. During the period between the album's recording and release, the band broke up and frontman Mick Head became addicted to heroin. A back-up of the recordings, lost and recovered by producer Chris Allison, was released on Marina Records in 1995. Ultimately, Waterpistol was well received by critics. The album was reissued in 2007 in expanded form by The Red Flag Recording Company.

== Recording and music ==
Shack's 1988 debut album, Zilch, was a commercial flop upon its release. Critical consensus was that Head's songwriting was promising but that the album's production was lacking. In 1990, frontman Mick Head told NME that Shack's second album would be less lyrically serious than Zilch and that the band's influences at the time were The Stone Roses, Flowered Up, and The Charlatans. He also stated:

The stuff I'm working on now is far more humorous ... The new LP's gonna have better stories on it. It's a great challenge to put a story into a three-minute pop song. It'll still be very melodic, though, but with a more straight guitary vibe than before. It's gonna be a great album when it's finished.

The album was recorded in 1991 at Star Street Studio in London. Producer Chris Allison had difficulty working with Mick, saying that "Mick could never finish anything. I’ve never worked with anyone like him, and I hope I never do again. But he's a songwriting genius and one of the most gifted artists I’ve ever worked with." Allison said that Head was dependent on alcohol to fuel his creativity, and recalled one incident of locking Head into the studio until he had completed recording five vocal takes.

Ian Lowey of Rough Guides said that musically, the album was very similar to The Stone Roses, but rather than looking to 1960s psychedelia as that band had done, Shack drew influence from 1960s pop music. Stewart Mason of AllMusic also compared the album's sound to a more acoustic-sounding version of the Stone Roses and The La's, and noted similarities to the genres of jangle pop and Britpop.

== Release ==
The release of Waterpistol was delayed due to several post-recording mishaps, contributing to what critic Dave Simpson of The Guardian called Shack's "classic rock'n'roll hard-luck tale". After the 1991 studio sessions during which the album was recorded, a fire destroyed Star Street Studio and the master tapes; shortly afterward the band's label Ghetto Recording Company went out of business. The remaining DAT tape masters were accidentally left by producer Chris Allison in his hire car while on vacation in the United States. Months after, Allison contacted the car rental company he had used, Alamo Rent a Car, and tracked down the missing tapes. In the interim, Shack broke up after its bassist left to join Cast, and Mick sank into a state of depression, heroin addiction, and usage of other drugs including MDMA.

Waterpistol was not released until October 1995 by Marina Records, an independent German label specialising in releases of UK musicians. A limited edition vinyl was released on 12 July 1999. The record sleeve is designed by Stefan Kassel in co-operation with Headcharge Hamburg and features the track list and a photo of a young boy smoking on the cover. The first pressing in 1995 included a photo of a motorcycle rider on the back of the booklet; on later pressings, this picture was exchanged with a photo of a couple lying in bed. The album was re-issued in September 2007 with different cover art by The Red Flag Recording Company.

== Reception ==
Professional ratings
Review scores
Source	Rating
AllMusic	4.5/5 stars
Mojo	(favourable)
Rough Guides	(favourable)

A 1995 review in Music Week was highly positive. Comparing the album's delayed release to that of the Beach Boys' famous lost album Smile, it was written that "1995 sees the launch of one of 1991's best records, a tour-de-force of timeless pop songs that sound as fresh as anything new you’ll hear this year. [...] Fans of expertly played, emotional music have much cause for cheer [...] Waterpistol may never top the charts, and Shack may never play again, but at least this lost classic is now available." In 1999, NME claimed that Waterpistol was "an album fit to inspire a generation". Melody Maker urged readers to buy the record by calling it "beautiful", AllMusic's Stewart Mason wrote, "Waterpistol is one of those rare 'lost' albums that's actually as good or better than the hype suggests. This may actually be better than the more lauded H.M.S. Fable." Nick Southall of Stylus called the album a collection of "wonderful, uplifting slices of post-Beatles-Anthology-revivalist guitar bliss". In a 2008 review, Chris Catchpole of Mojo called it "very much a record rooted in the inner cities of a post-Thatcher Britain".

== Track listing ==
All tracks are written by Michael Head.

No.	Title	Length
1.	"Sgt. Major"	4:51
2.	"Neighbours"	4:02
3.	"Stranger"	5:24
4.	"Dragonfly"	3:28
5.	"Mood of the Morning"	3:49
6.	"Walter's Song*"	3:17
7.	"Time Machine"	4:53
8.	"Mr. Appointment"	5:31
9.	"Undecided"	3:52
10.	"Hazy"	4:06
11.	"Hey Mama"	4:48
12.	"London Town"	3:57

- Walter's Song is a reworking of a song from Night of the Hunter – Dream, Little One, Dream (uncredited) Composer unknown. Sung by a chorus during the opening credits. Reprised offscreen by an unidentified female when the children are on the run. https://www.imdb.com/title/tt0048424/soundtrack
