= Oh Ah! =

Studio album by Stereo Total
- Released: 1995
- Genre: Electronic
- Label: Peace95

Stereo Total chronology
Oh Ah! (1995)	Monokini (1997)

Oh Ah! is Stereo Total's debut album released in 1995.

== Track listing ==
1. "Dactylo Rock" – 2.32
2. "C'est la mort" – 2.50
3. "Miau Miau" – 2.01
4. "Comme un garçon" – 2.39
5. "Belami" – 2.10
6. "Johnny" – 1.56
7. "Morose" – 2.09
8. "Je suis venu te dire que je m'en vais" – 3.06
9. "Push It" – 0.58
10. "Souvenir Souvenir" – 1.28
11. "Auf dem blauen Meer" – 1.48
12. "Moviestar" – 2.19
13. "À l'amour comme à la guerre" – 3.04
14. "Get Down Tonight" – 2.38
15. "Dans le parc" – 4.36
16. "Epitaph" – 1.07
17. "Moi je joue" – 1.39

Professional ratings
Review scores
Source	Rating
Allmusic	3/5 stars
