= Michael Head (musician) =

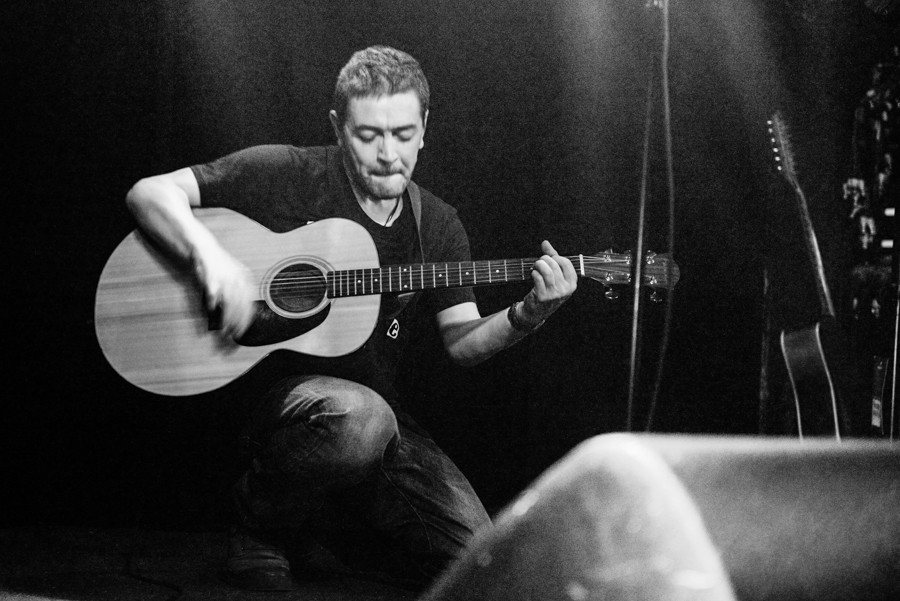

Background information
- Born: 24 November 1961 (age 64); Liverpool, England
- Genres: Alternative rock, indie pop
- Occupation(s): Musician, songwriter
- Instrument(s): Vocals, guitar
- Years active: 1981–present
- Labels: Operation Twilight; Virgin Records; Ghetto Recording Company; Megaphone; London Records; North Country; Sour Mash; Violette Records; Modern Sky UK
- Website: Michael Head

Michael William Head (born 24 November 1961) is an English singer-songwriter and musician from Liverpool, England. He is most famous as the lead singer and songwriter for Shack and the Pale Fountains, both of which also feature his younger brother John Head. Though the bands never achieved mainstream success, they have a strong following and NME have described him as "a lost genius and among the most gifted British songwriters of his generation."

== The Pale Fountains ==
Head first gained attention as a member of the Pale Fountains in the early 1980s with his best friend Chris "Biffa" McCaffrey. The band suffered from critical and commercial apathy, and the band split around 1987. Shortly afterwards, McCaffrey died from a brain tumour.

In 2008, Head reformed The Pale Fountains to play a couple of gigs to celebrate 25 years since their inception.

== Shack ==
In 1986, Head formed Shack with John on lead guitar, Peter Wilkinson on bass and Mick Hurst on drums.

The group debuted in 1988 with Zilch, falling victim to the commercial indifference which earlier plagued The Pale Fountains' career. The follow-up, Waterpistol, was recorded in 1991 at London's Star Street Studio, but shortly after the finished disc was mixed the studio burned to the ground, and the completed master was lost. Producer Chris Allison had the only surviving copy of the album, but unaware of a fire that demolished the studio, carelessly left his copy of the tape in a rental car while in the U.S.; upon returning to the UK and learning of the studio's fate he managed to contact the rental car company and rescue the DAT, but the record company had collapsed and there was no one to distribute it.

Waterpistol was not released until 1995, by which point Shack had split up. The siblings reformed Shack soon after with bassist Ren Parry and drummer lain Templeton, returning in 1999 with H.M.S. Fable and Here's Tom with the Weather (2003). They signed to Oasis guitarist Noel Gallagher's Sour Mash label and released ...The Corner of Miles and Gil in 2006. A Best Of album, Time Machine was released in 2007.

== Michael Head introducing The Strands ==
After touring for a while with childhood heroes Love, Head went on to form Michael Head introducing The Strands, again with brother John on guitar. In 1997, they released the critically acclaimed album The Magical World of the Strands.

2008 was a relatively quiet one for Head, starting with Shack being part of Liverpool, The Musical, which was part of the European City of Culture celebrations and ending with another new venture, Michael Head & The Red Elastic Band.

== Michael Head & the Red Elastic Band ==
In September 2013, Michael Head & the Red Elastic Band released their debut record, an EP entitled Artorius Revisited, on Violette Records, following this with a limited edition release of the double A-side 7" single "Velvets in the Dark / Koala Bears" in March 2015.

In October 2017, Michael Head & the Red Elastic Band released an album called Adiós Señor Pussycat. It reached No. 1 on the UK Independent Albums Chart and No. 57 on the UK Albums Chart.

In early 2019, Michael Head parted company with Violette Records, entering the studio in August of that year with producer and songwriter/musician Bill Ryder-Jones to begin recording a new album with the provisional title New Brighton Rock. Four of the new songs were played live for the first time at Michael Head & the Red Elastic Band's first and only live show of 2019, held at Liverpool's Invisible Wind Factory. The show generated a positive response on social media and was followed by a short tour in early 2020.

The album Dear Scott was released on Modern Sky UK in June 2022. It received a 4-star review in The Guardian and a 5-star review in Mojo magazine. The album peaked at number 6 on the official UK chart, making it Michael Head's highest-ever charting album. The album was also number one in the UK Independent Chart. The album release was followed by a UK tour in June 2022, with further dates in 2022 to follow. On 11 and 16 November 2022 respectively, Uncut and Mojo published their 75 Best Albums of 2022 yearend lists, where the former ranked Dear Scott the third best and the latter the best album of the year.

== Discography ==
- The Magical World of the Strands (1997) - LP (Michael Head introducing The Strands)
- "Somethin' Like You" (1998) - No. 150 (UK) - single (Michael Head introducing The Strands)
- Artorius Revisited EP (2013) - 12" vinyl / CD (Michael Head & the Red Elastic Band)
- Velvets In The Dark/Koala Bears (2015) - 7" single (Michael Head & the Red Elastic Band)
- Adios Señor Pussycat (2017) - LP (Michael Head & the Red Elastic Band)
- Dear Scott (2022) - LP (Michael Head & the Red Elastic Band)
- Loophole (2024) - LP (Michael Head & the Red Elastic Band)
