= Töging am Inn =

- Town
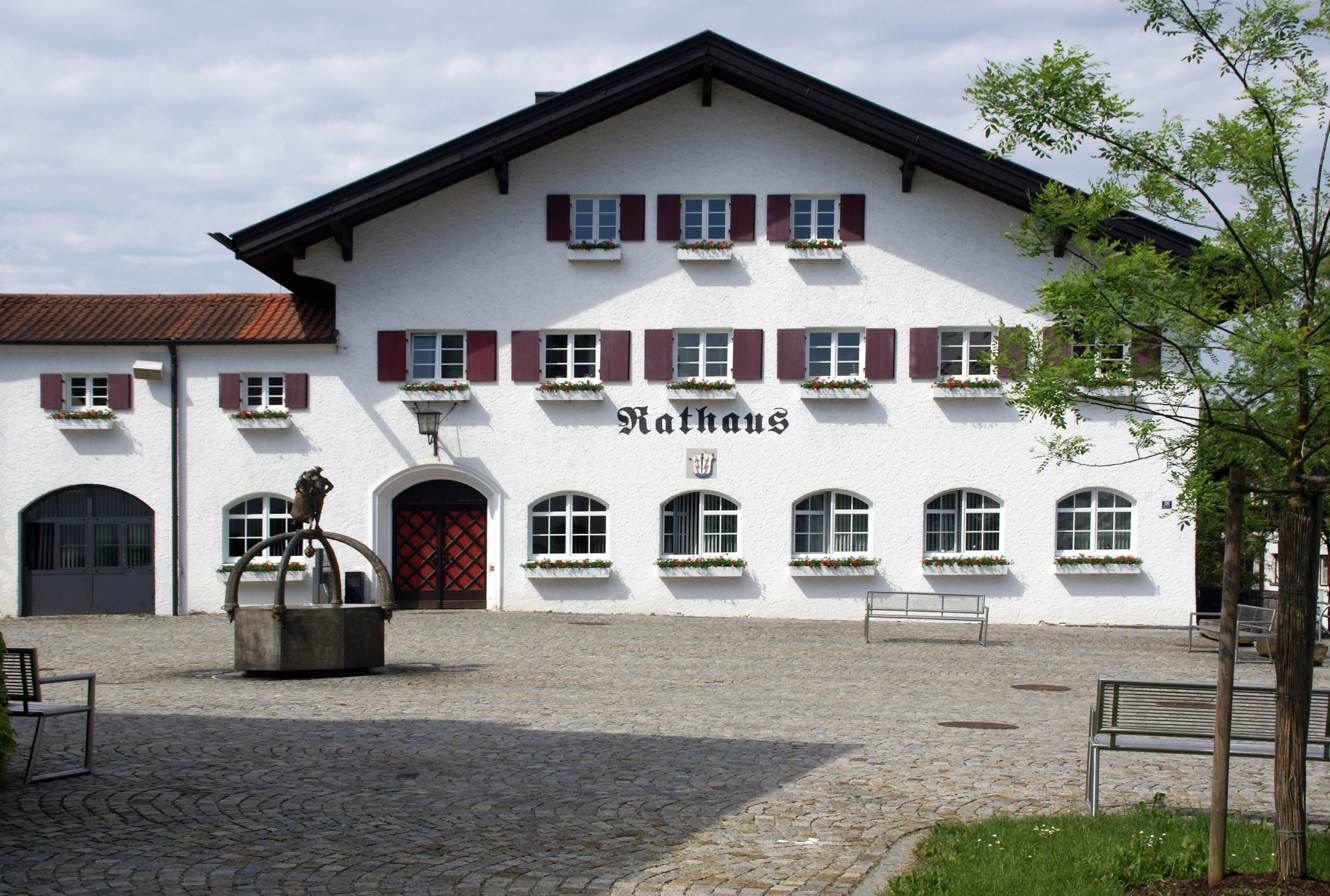
- Town hall

- Coat of arms

- Location of Töging am Inn within Altötting district
- Interactive map of Töging am Inn
- Location within Germany Location within Bavaria
- Coordinates: 48°15′N 12°34′E
- Country: Germany
- State: Bavaria
- Admin. region: Oberbayern
- District: Altötting
- Subdivisions: 9 Gemeindeteile

Government
  - Mayor (2020–26): Tobias Windhorst (CSU)

Area
  - Total: 13.65 km^{2} (5.27 sq mi)
- Elevation: 398 m (1,306 ft)

Population (2025-12-31)
  - Total: 9,574
  - Density: 701.4/km^{2} (1,817/sq mi)
- Time zone: UTC+01:00 (CET)
  - Summer (DST): UTC+02:00 (CEST)
- Postal codes: 84513
- Dialling codes: 08631
- Vehicle registration: AÖ
- Website: www.toeging.de

Töging am Inn (German pronunciation: [ˈtøːɡɪŋ ʔam ˈʔɪn], lit. 'Töging on the Inn'; Central Bavarian: Deging am Inn) is a town of 9,382 inhabitants in the district of Altötting, Upper Bavaria, Germany. It lies on the river Inn.

== History ==
Thanks to an artificial water canal, the town is adjacent to a large water power plant, which used to power e.g. an aluminum furnace. Because of many factories in the area, slave workers from the Dachau concentration camp were located nearby during World War II.

The town hit the news on 7 February 2006, when the roof of the local Netto supermarket collapsed. Nobody was hurt in the incident.
