= Discotheque (Stereo Total album) =

Remix album by Stereo Total
- Released: 2006, 20 January
- Genre: Electronic
- Label: Disko B

Stereo Total chronology
Do the Bambi (2005)	Discotheque (2006)	Paris-Berlin (2007)

Discotheque is a remix album released by Stereo Total in 2005. It features covers of Motormark's "I hate everybody in the discoteque", the Rolling Stones' "Mother's Little Helper", Velvet Underground's "Stephanie says" with new lyrics by Taxigirl, and Serge Gainsbourgs "Bad News from the stars". Other remixes were: Mars Rendezvous, Babystrich, Europa Neurotisch (remixed by Stereo Total), Chelsea Girls (remixed by Thieves like us) Das erste Mal (by Vredus and Justus Köhnke and four dub remixes by Mad Professor) Troglodyten (remixed by Munk)

== Sources ==
- stereototal.de

== Track listing ==
1. Everybody In The Discotheque (I Hate) (We Love Motor Mark Mix) - 2.13 -
2. Europa Neurotisch - 1.00
3. Mother's Little Helper (We Love Polyphonic Size - Doctor Pleeease Mix) - 1.53
4. Mars Rendezvous (We Love Jacno Mix) - 3.36
5. Je Rêve Encore De Toi (We Love Taxigirl Mix) - 2.53
6. Babystrich (We Love Christiane F. Mix) - 4.13
7. Bad News From The Stars - 2.16
8. Everybody In The Discotheque (I Hate) (Version By Echokrank) - 3.10
9. Chelsea Girls (Thieves Like Us Remix) - 7.20
10. Das Erste Mal (Vredus Remix) - 5.07
11. Troglodyten (Munk Edit) - 6.16
12. Das Erste Mal (Justus Köhncke Remix) - 8.07
13. Das Erste Mal (Mad Professor's Dub Trip 1) - 3.51
14. Das Erste Mal (Mad Professor's Dub Trip 2) - 3.51
15. Das Erste Mal (Mad Professor's Dub Trip 3) - 3.55
16. Das Erste Mal (Mad Professor's Dub Trip 4) - 4.00
