= Shack (band) =

English rock and pop band

- Origin: Liverpool, England
- Genres: Alternative rock, Britpop
- Years active: 1987–1992, 1998–present
- Labels: Ghetto, London, Sour Mash
- Members: Michael Head; John Head; Martyn Campbell
- Past members: Justin Smith; Michael Hurst; Dave Butcher; Peter Wilkinson; Alan Wills; Ren Parry; Guy Rigby; Johnny Baxter; Iain Templeton
- Website: shacknet.co.uk

Shack is an English band from Liverpool, formed in 1987 by brothers Mick and John Head. Emerging from the cult 1980s band The Pale Fountains, Shack experienced various lineup changes and challenges, including the loss of early recordings in a studio fire. Despite these setbacks, they released several albums, such as Zilch (1988), Waterpistol (1995), and H.M.S. Fable (1999), which received critical acclaim. The band underwent multiple hiatuses and re-formations, with their music evolving over time. In the 2000s, Shack signed with Noel Gallagher's Sour Mash label and released albums like ...The Corner of Miles and Gil (2006). They briefly reunited The Pale Fountains in 2008 and continued to perform until drummer Iain Templeton's death in 2022. Mick Head has since focused on his project Michael Head & the Red Elastic Band, achieving his highest-charting album with Dear Scott in 2022.

== History ==
=== The Pale Fountains ===
Before founding Shack, Michael and John Head were in the cult 1980s band the Pale Fountains, and released two albums, Pacific Street in March 1984 and ...From Across the Kitchen Table in March 1985. However, though critically acclaimed, the albums only reached numbers 85 and 94 on the UK Albums Chart. That band ended around 1986 and returned from London to their home town of Liverpool. Bassist and founding member Chris "Biffa" McCaffrey died of a brain tumour in 1989, a few years after the band broke up.

=== 1987–1996: Zilch, Waterpistol and hiatus ===
The Head brothers soon re-emerged as Shack, signing to the Ghetto Recording Company, home of record producer Ian Broudie's solo project, The Lightning Seeds and British soul band Distant Cousins. Shack's first album Zilch was released in 1988, but was neither critically nor commercially successful. The album was later re-released on the Red Flag Recording Company label with three extra tracks in 2007.

The follow-up, Waterpistol, was recorded in 1991 at London's Star Street Studio and Chapel Studios, Lincolnshire. Shortly after the recording of Waterpistol was complete, the Star Street studio burnt down and most of the tapes were destroyed. The only remaining DAT of the album was in the possession of producer Chris Allison. At the time, Allison was in Los Angeles, and when he returned, it transpired that he had left the copy in his hire car. It was found weeks later after a frenzied search. However, by this point, Ghetto had folded, so the record was without a distributor. Shack split, with Wilkinson joining fellow Liverpudlian John Power (formerly of The La's) to form the successful Britpop band Cast. The Head brothers accompanied Love for a few touring dates in 1992.

Waterpistol was finally released in 1995 on the German independent record label Marina. NME described Mick Head as "a lost genius and among the most gifted British songwriters of his generation". The album was later re-released with new artwork on the Red Flag Recording Company label in 2007. Michael Head went on to form Michael Head & The Strands with his brother John, which found them further critical acclaim with their record The Magical World of The Strands on its release in 1996.

=== 1998–2019: Re-formation and new albums ===
The Head brothers, along with Iain Templeton (who drummed on The Magical World of The Strands) and bassist Ren Parry re-formed Shack in 1998, releasing H.M.S. Fable (1999), reaching the top 25 on the UK albums chart. Parry was replaced by Guy Rigby on bass for ...here's tom with the weather (2003). Wilkinson rejoined in 2005, replacing the departed Rigby.

The band signed to Noel Gallagher's Sour Mash record label. In May 2006 they released the album ...The Corner of Miles and Gil, which is named after two of the Head brothers' heroes, Miles Davis and Gil Evans.

In October 2007, the band released their greatest hits compilation album, Time Machine, including two new tracks. They toured briefly in England in October and November with Martyn Campbell on bass, including a set at the Liverpool Academy on 26 October 2007, which was filmed and recorded for a possible live album or DVD.

In February 2008, the band re-formed the Pale Fountains for two critically acclaimed live shows in Liverpool and London. The members of the re-formed band were Michael Head, John Head, Martyn Campbell, Andy Diagram, Thomas 'Jock' Whelan and Iain Templeton. Since 2008, John Head has pursued a solo career playing live shows with his band The Streams. Michael Head launched a new project, Michael Head & The Red Elastic Band, on his own label Violette Records.

Shack played together again in June 2010 at a charity event in Winsford.

=== 2020–present ===
As of 6 June 2022, Mick Head is leading Michael Head & the Red Elastic Band, whose album Dear Scott was released on The Coral's record label Modern Sky UK. The album received a four star review in The Guardian and became Head's highest-charting album in the UK, with the Official Charts Company giving the album a midweek position of number four.

Drummer Iain Templeton died on 19 December 2022.

== Members ==
=== Current ===
- Michael Head – vocals, guitar (1987–1992, 1998–present)
- John Head – guitar (1987–1992, 1998–present)
- Martyn Campbell – bass (1992, 2007–present)

=== Past ===
- Justin Smith – bass (1987–1990)
- Michael Hurst – drums (1987–1990)
- Dave Butcher – keyboards (1987–1990)
- Peter Wilkinson – bass (1990–1991, 2005–2006)
- Alan Wills – drums (1990–1991) (died 2014)
- Ren Parry – bass (1998–2002)
- Guy Rigby – bass (2002–2004)
- Johnnie Baxter – drums
- Iain Templeton – drums (1991–1992, 1998–2022; died 2022)

== Discography ==
=== Studio albums ===
Year	Album	Peak chart position
Year	Album	UK
1988	Zilch: Released: March 1988; Label: Ghetto	–
1995	Waterpistol: Released: 1995; Label: Marina	–
1999	H.M.S. Fable: Released: 21 June 1999; Label: London	25
2003	... Here's Tom with the Weather: Released: 11 August 2003; Label: North Country	55
2006	...The Corner of Miles and Gil: Released: 15 May 2006; Label: Sour Mash	55

=== Other albums ===
- Arthur Lee & Shack Live in Liverpool (2000)
- The Fable Sessions (2003)
- Time Machine: The Best of Shack (2007)

=== Singles ===
Year	Title	Peak chart position	Album
Year	Title	UK	Album
1988	"Emergency"	–	Zilch
1988	"High Rise Low Life"	–	Zilch
1990	"I Know You Well"	–	Non-album singles
1991	"Al's Vacation"	–	Non-album singles
1999	"Comedy"	44	H.M.S. Fable
1999	"Natalie's Party"	63	H.M.S. Fable
2000	"Oscar"	67	Non-album single
2003	"Byrds Turn to Stone"	63	...Here's Tom with the Weather
2006	"Tie Me Down"	114	...The Corner of Miles and Gil
2006	"Cup of Tea"	126	...The Corner of Miles and Gil
