= Foxy Digitalis =

Online music magazine

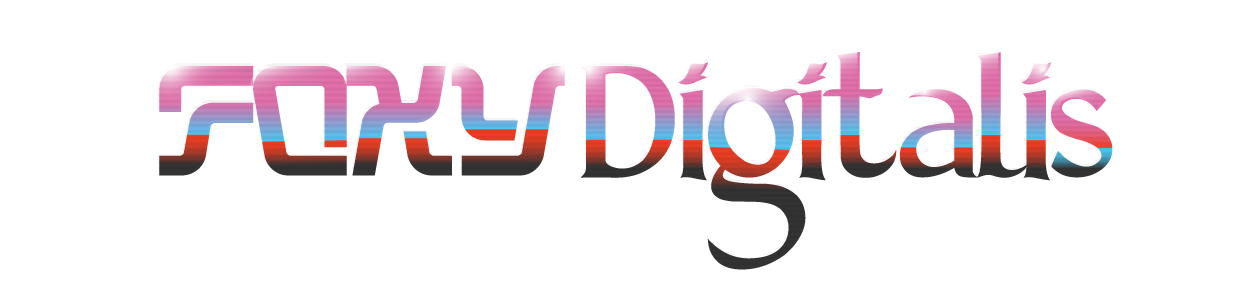
- Website type: Online music magazine
- Available in: English
- Creator: Brad Rose
- Website: foxydigitalis.zone
- Launched: 2003; 23 years ago
- Current status: Active

Foxy Digitalis is an online music magazine. Aquarium Drunkard have called it "an online publication exploring the deepest corners of experimental music, they continue a project that has existed in various forms since the mid-1990s."

== History ==
Foxy Digitalis originally started as a music zine in Tulsa, Oklahoma in 1996. Rose launched the Foxy Digitalis website with his wife, Eden Hemming, when the two relocated from Tulsa to Seattle in 2003. The site published reviews, interviews, and essays related to underground an experimental music, until ceasing publication in 2013. Pitchfork wrote; "Since 2003, the webzine and its 40-plus writers have exposed a wide range of experimental music, and fostered a community of international artists and labels trading homemade cassettes and limited-run LPs." The site relaunched in 2021.
