= Chica Sato =

Japanese musician and fashion model

Chikako Sato (佐藤 千賀子, Satō Chikako), better known as Chica Sato (佐藤 チカ, Satō Chika) is a Japanese musician and fashion model best known as the lead vocalist for new wave band Plastics who then went on to form Melon with Plastics bandmate Toshio Nakanishi. The duo became a prominent fixture in the Tokyo club and fashion scenes, serving as trendsetters responsible for bringing British, American new wave, graffiti, and hip-hop to Japan.
