= Plastics (band) =

Japanese new wave band

- Origin: Tokyo, Japan
- Genres: New wave; post-punk; synth-pop
- Years active: 1976–1981; 1989; 2010–2016
- Labels: Rough Trade; Invitation; Island; Victor Musical Industries, Inc
- Past members: Chica Sato; Toshio Nakanishi (deceased); Hajime Tachibana; Masahide Sakuma (deceased); Takemi Shima; Gota Yashiki

Plastics, or the Plastics, were a short-lived Japanese new wave band who rose to prominence in the late 1970s and early 1980s. Their music was a major influence on Japanese pop music and their songs have been covered by many bands, most notably Polysics, Pizzicato Five, and Stereo Total.

In September 2007, Rolling Stone Japan ranked their debut album Welcome Plastics at No. 19 on their list of the "100 Greatest Japanese Rock Albums of All Time".

== Biography ==
Fellow new wave bands Talking Heads, The B-52's and Devo were fans of Plastics and were instrumental in getting their albums released in the United States. The band's mainstream exposure began when Toshio Nakanishi designed a tour program book for Talking Heads and gave their frontman David Byrne a tape of Plastics demos. Byrne promptly sent it to the B-52's' manager, who offered to represent them internationally.

The band used the Roland CR-68 and CR-78 drum machines for their early albums. In 1980, member Masahide Sakuma had some input on the Roland Corporation's development of the Roland TR-808 drum machine. When its development was complete, the Plastics owned the first TR-808 model, which they used on their 1981 album Welcome Back.

On February 19, 1982, NBC's late night comedy show SCTV aired the promotional video for Plastics' song "Top Secret Man" as part of the "Midnight Video Special" sketch, hosted by Gerry Todd (Rick Moranis).

Stereo Total's cover of their song "I Love You, Oh No!" (with the title amended to "I Love You Ono") was used in television commercials for Sony Ericsson in Europe around 2006 and by Dell computers in the US in 2009.

On January 16, 2014, Masahide Sakuma died from scirrhous gastric cancer and a brain tumor. He was 61. On May 10, 2016, Plastics got together to perform their final concert at Blue Note Tokyo. On February 25, 2017, Toshio Nakanishi died from esophageal cancer, also at the age of 61. The following year, the band released the recording of their final concert under the name A in memory of Nakanishi.

== Band members ==
- Chica Sato (佐藤 チカ) – vocal, synth drums
- Toshio Nakanishi (中西 俊夫) – vocal, guitar & percussion
- Hajime Tachibana (立花 肇(ハジメ)) – guitar & vocal
- Masahide Sakuma (佐久間 正英) – keyboards, guitar & bass programming
- Takemi Shima (島 武実) – rhythm box

== Discography ==
=== Studio albums ===
Year	Title	Notes
1980	Welcome Plastics: Label: Invitation	
1980	Origato Plastico: Label: Invitation	
1981	Welcome Back: Label: Invitation	Re-recorded versions. Also known as Plastics. Originally came with a 7" picture flexi-disc of their version of the Monkees hit "Last Train to Clarksville" and Japanese B-side "Pate."

=== Live albums ===
Year	Title	Notes
1997	All Across the U.S.A. 80 Live: Label: Speedstar; Released: November 21, 1997	Recorded at Irving Plaza, New York, August 30, 1980, and Whisky a Go Go, Los Angeles, April 23, 1980.
2009	Dr. Vobg: Label: Bridge Inc.; Released: August 15, 2009	
2016	We Love You Oh No! Plastics Live in Central Park NYC 1981: Label: T-Annex; Released: April 16, 2016	Vinyl LP only.
2018	A: Label: Victor; Released: February 21, 2018	Live recording of the band's final reunion in 2016, with bonus disc containing five early demos.

=== Compilation albums ===
Year	Title	Notes
1981	Best One '82 プラスチックス: Label: Invitation	Cassette only.
1988	Forever Plastico: Label: Invitation; Released: November 1, 1988	Contains Welcome Plastics in its entirety and selected tracks from Origato Plastico.
2005	Hard Copy: Label: P.S.C Ltd.; Released: July 13, 2005	Live at Yaneura. Includes DVD U.S. Tour 1981.
2005	Origato25: Label: Speedstar	Two-disc "greatest hits" compilation with four rare/new tracks.
2013	Plastic Paradise (Early Plastics Lost Tape): Label: K&B Publishers; Released: July 8, 2013	Included with Toshio Nakanishi's book The Rise and Fall of Plastics, Melon and Major Force Be With You. Features five early demos and three live tracks from Q's Bar, all from 1977.

=== Singles ===
Year	Title	Notes
1979	"Top Secret Man" / "Copy": Label: Rough Trade	Promo only.
1979	"Copy" / "Robot": Label: Rough Trade	Early recordings.
1980	"Top Secret Man" / "Delicious": Label: Invitation	
1980	"Good" / "Pate": Label: Invitation	Non-album B-side.
1980	"Peace" / "Desolate": Label: Invitation	
1981	"Last Train to Clarksville": Label: Island	One-sided limited edition promo. Re-recorded version.
1981	"Diamond Head" / "Peace": Label: Island; Released: March 9, 1981	Gold flexi-disc promo. Re-recorded versions.
1981	"Pate" / "Last Train to Clarksville": Label: Island	One-sided picture flexi-disc.

=== EPs ===
Year	Title	Notes
1981	"Diamond Head (Long Version)" / "Robot" / "Top Secret Man" / "Peace": Label: Island	12" promo featuring re-recorded versions.

=== Selected compilation appearances ===
Year	Title	Track	Notes
2004	Techno Pop: Label: BMG; Released: August 25, 2004	"Pate"	B-side of "Good" single.
2010	Downtown 81 (12 Titres Extraits De La B.O. Du Film Culte): Label: Les Inrockuptibles; Released: October 2010	"Copy"	Early single version. Free CD sampler with French magazine Les Inrockuptibles issue N°46 Hors Série, dedicated to Jean-Michel Basquiat.

=== Notes ===
- The Plastics performed "Last Train to Clarksville" as a medley with other songs by the Monkees, namely "Star Collector" and "She".
