= Toshio Nakanishi =

Japanese musician and graphic designer (1956–2017)

Toshio Nakanishi 中西 俊夫 中西俊夫
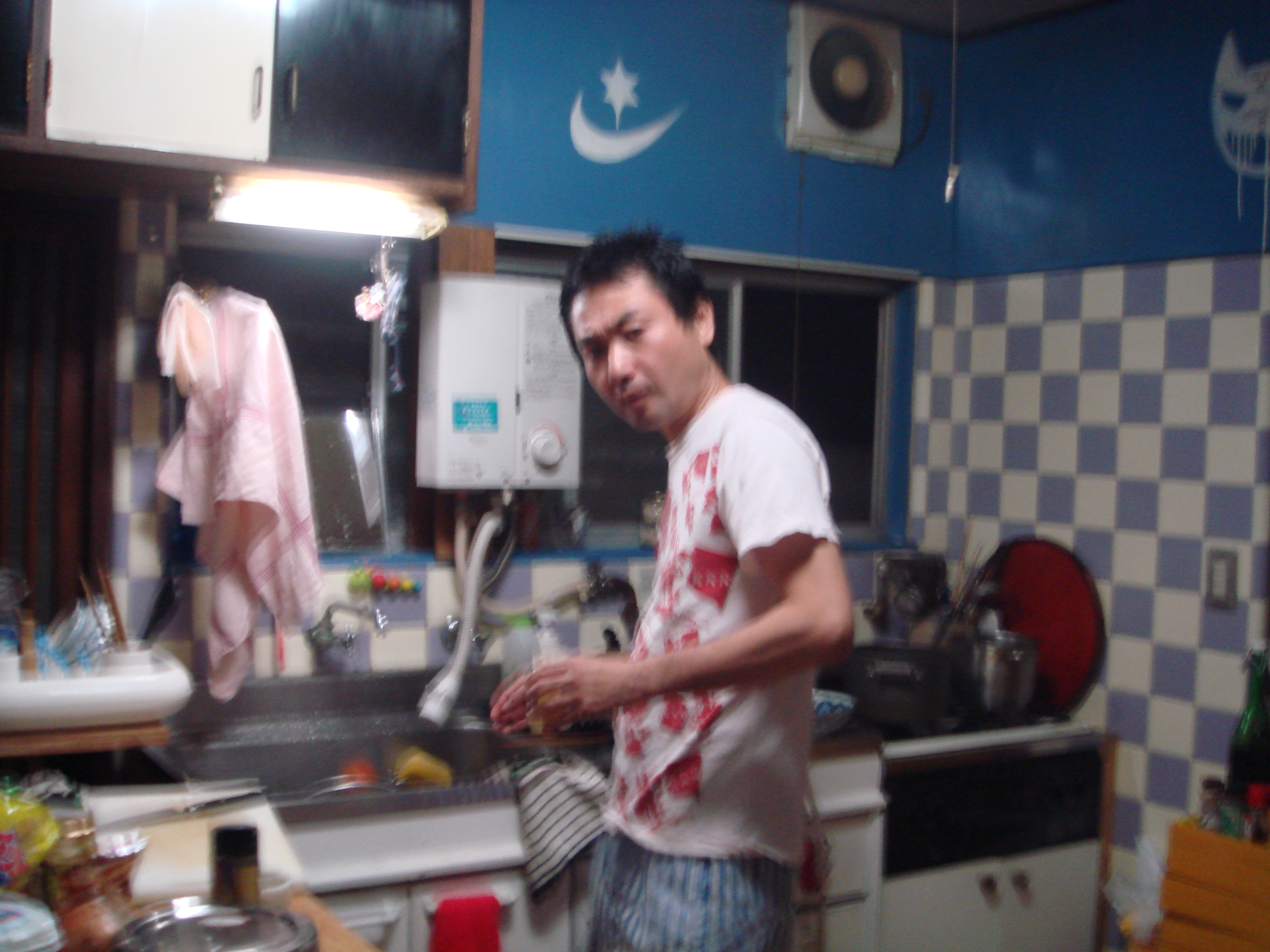
- Nakanishi in 2006

Background information
- Also known as: Tycoon To$h, Typhoom Tosh
- Born: 13 January 1956; Tokyo, Japan
- Died: 25 February 2017 (aged 61); Tokyo, Japan
- Genres: New wave, technopop, hip hop
- Instrument(s): Vocals, guitar
- Years active: 1976–2017
- Website: www4.airnet.ne.jp/mor/tosh/

Toshio Nakanishi (中西 俊夫, Nakanishi Toshio, January 13, 1956 – February 25, 2017), also known by the pseudonyms Tycoon To$h or Typhoom Tosh, was a Japanese musician and graphic designer who was best known as the founding member of new wave band Plastics in 1976. He was initially a part of the technopop fever in Japan and later acted as a pioneer of the Japanese hip hop scene with his band Major Force.

== Personal life ==
He was formerly married to Japanese stylist and bandmate Chica Sato of Plastics and Melon. In September 2016, Nakanishi was diagnosed with esophageal cancer. He died on February 25, 2017.

== Discography ==
Solo albums

- GORGEOUS GIRLS (1990)
- ユーリ ORIGINAL SOUND TRACK (1996)

Albums with K.U.D.O

- THE 1st KISS (as Sexy T.K.O.)(1991)
- SANDII:COME AGAIN (1991)
- SANDII:JOGET TO THE BEAT (1991)
- EP (as Love T.K.O.) (1993)
- HEAD TURNER (as Love T.K.O.) (1994)
- Monday Michiru: Maden Japan (as Love T.K.O.) (1994)

Other albums

- The Clap Heads, Snakeman Show (1980)
- (Natural Calamity), DOWN IN THE VALLEY (1991)
- (Natural Calamity), LET IT COME DOWN (1992)
- (Natural Calamity), NEAR MOUNTAIN (1992)
- Group of Gods, GROUP OF GOD (1992)
- (Tamap Iijima), DASK 'TIL DAWN (1992)
- (高木完), Grass Roots (1992)
- (Natural Calamity), SUN DANCE (1994)
