= Bobsled Records =

- Founded: 1997
- Founder: Bob Salerno, Jeff Slay
- Defunct: 2002
- Status: Inactive
- Genre: Pop
- Country of origin: U.S.
- Location: Aurora, Illinois

Bobsled Records was a pop music-focused record label based in Aurora, Illinois, active from 1997 to 2002.

== History ==
Bobsled Records was co-founded in 1997 by Bob Salerno and his friend Jeff Slay. The first band to be signed to the label was Adventures in Stereo, which was followed by the Chicago-based band Chamber Strings and the French/German duo Stereo Total, among other bands. By 2000, there were five bands signed to the label: Adventures in Stereo, Chamber Strings, Stereo Total, the Waxwings, and Velvet Crush.

The label's end began in 2002, when Salerno wrote a 1,700-word to the Waxwings, one of the label's signature artists. The email criticized the Waxwings for being unprepared and not acting like a "real" rock 'n' roll band at one of their record release parties. The letter was later posted online, and the label folded after the Waxwings released their second album, Shadows Of The Waxwings, later in 2002.
