= Stereo Total =

French-German music duo

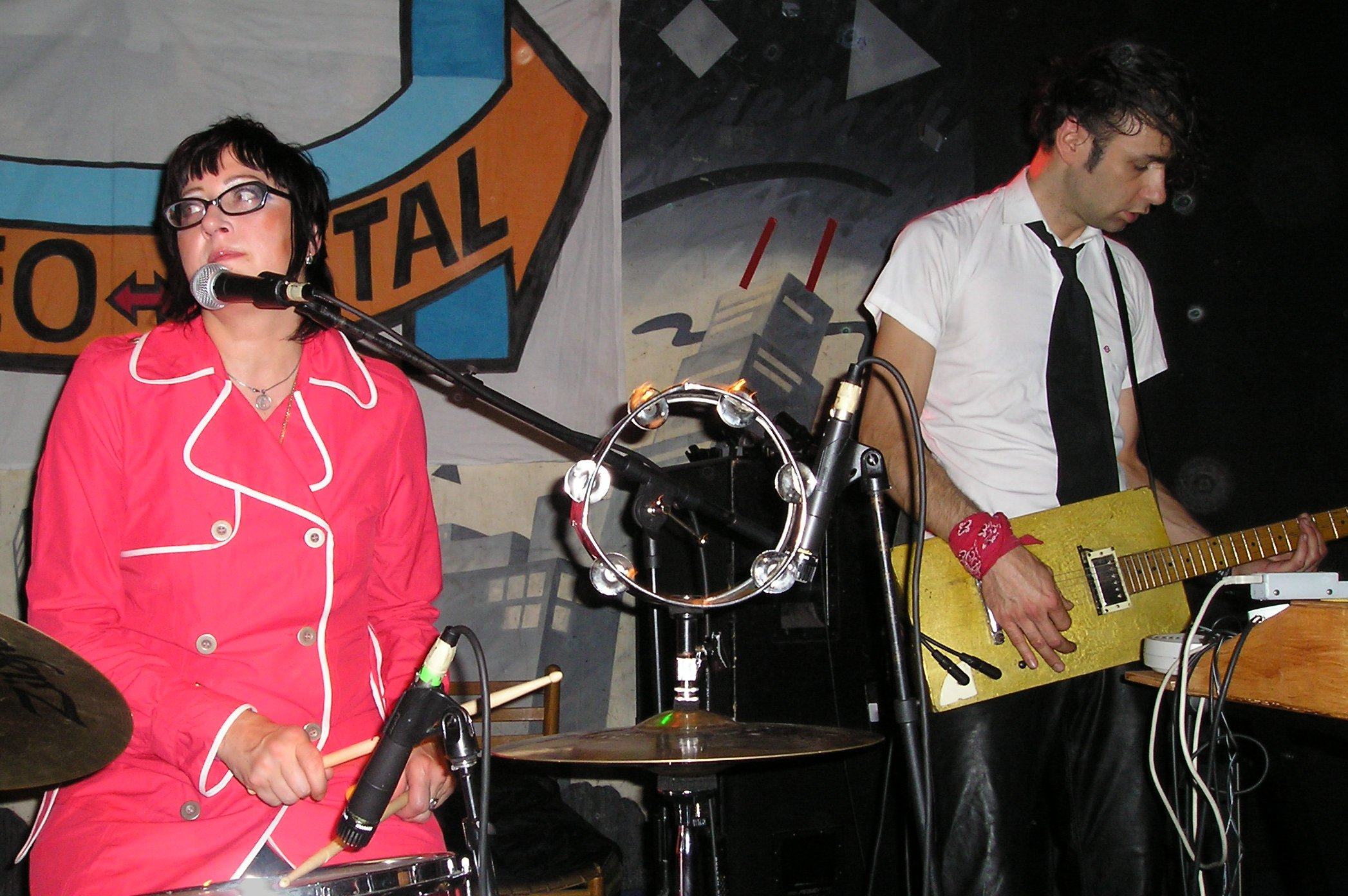
- Stereo Total, 2005

Background information
- Origin: Berlin, Germany
- Genres: Electropop; new wave; synthpop; garage rock; indie; lo-fi; electroclash; punk rock; indie pop; post-punk revival
- Years active: 1993–2021
- Labels: Disko B; Peace 95; Little Teddy; Desert; Bungalow; L'Appareil Photo; Bobsled; Blow Up
- Past members: Françoise Cactus; Brezel Göring; Angie Reed; San Reimo; Iznogood; Lesley Campbell
- Website: stereototal.de

Stereo Total was a Berlin-based multilingual, French-German duo which comprised Françoise Cactus (born Françoise van Hove and formerly co-leader of the West Berlin band Les Lolitas) and Brezel ('pretzel') Göring (a.k.a. Friedrich von Finsterwalde, born Friedrich Ziegler, ex-Haunted Henschel, Sigmund Freud Experience).

Stereo Total's social media accounts reported that Françoise Cactus died from breast cancer on 17 February 2021, aged 57.

Both Cactus and Göring sung and played multiple instruments. When they appeared on stage as a duo, Cactus frequently played drums while Göring played guitar and synth; at other times the touring band has included additional musicians such as bassist and vocalist Angie Reed.

Their early career was nurtured within Berlin's easy listening scene, and they frequently supported the DJ team Le Hammond Inferno, who went on to form Bungalow Records and sign Stereo Total to their label. Stereo Total became the most successful act on Bungalow, finding an audience not just beyond Berlin but also across Europe and eventually in Japan, Brazil and the US.

== Musical style ==
Their music is a playful, wildly eclectic mix of synth-pop, new wave, electronic, and pop music. The most consistent element in their cut and paste compositions is a retro-hip European 1960s style, with references to psych and garage-rock as well as to 1960s French-pop in the vein of Françoise Hardy, Jacques Dutronc, France Gall, and Brigitte Bardot. Some of their most recognized tracks are kitschy lo-fi covers of pop, rock and soul songs, such as their self-consciously trashy version of Salt-N-Pepa's electro rap hit "Push It".

Their songs are primarily sung in German, French and English, but some of their output also features a number of other languages, such as Japanese, Spanish and Turkish. The band has covered songs by Sylvie Vartan, Françoise Hardy, Brigitte Bardot, Brigitte Fontaine, Serge Gainsbourg, Johnny Hallyday, the Velvet Underground, Nico, the Rolling Stones, the Beatles, Harpo, Pizzicato Five, Hot Chocolate, Die Tödliche Doris, Nina Hagen, KC and the Sunshine Band and Marjo (Corbeau).

== Songs used in advertisements ==
"I Love You, Ono"—a re-titled cover version of "I Love You, Oh No!" by Japanese new wave band Plastics—from their album My Melody, was used by Sony in a European commercial for the Handycam in June 2005, and was also featured in Robot Food's snowboarding hit "Afterbang". In 2009, the song was used in a Dell commercial for the Studio 15. In 2012, "I Love You, Ono" was used in the Dior Addict advert in the United Kingdom and Spain. In 2013, it was used as the theme music for Channel 4's Anna and Katy – the choice of the show's co-writers and performers, Anna Crilly and Katy Wix. The title of the Stereo Total version is a play on both the original Plastics title and Yoko Ono, and is a likely homage to the original's Japanese origin.

Another one of their songs, "L'Amour à trois" (the French version of the song "Liebe zu Dritt"), was used in a commercial for 3G-phones in Sweden in the fall of 2005 by the company 3, as well as by the Spanish TV channel Cuatro in an advert for the company and in the disco scene in the independent Argentinian film Glue. Their song "Cannibale" was included in the console game Dance Dance Revolution ULTRAMIX 4, released in November 2006. "Megaflittchen" was also used in a commercial by Estonian mobile operator EMT.

"Aua" from the Monokini album was used in the trailers and closing titles for Adam Curtis's BBC Two documentary series All Watched Over by Machines of Loving Grace.

== Later career ==
After Reed left the band, she pursued a solo career. Her debut solo concept album, Presents the Best of Barbara Brockhaus, recorded at Chicks on Speed Records and produced by Patric Catani and Bomb 20, was released in 2003. Angie toured most of Europe as well as Istanbul, Tokyo and Moscow until 2005, when her second album, XYZ Frequency was released. She worked with a lot of well-known bands and musicians like Die Goldenen Zitronen, Gonzales or Namosh. Angie writes the lyrics, sings the vocals to her records, plays most of the instruments and does some of the production work. Her music ranges from pure electronica to rock. Her shows are often accompanied by video and images that she designed.

== Discography ==
=== Studio albums ===
- 1995 · Oh Ah!
- 1997 · Monokini
- 1998 · Juke-Box Alarm
- 1999 · My Melody
- 2001 · Musique Automatique
- 2005 · Do the Bambi
- 2007 · Paris-Berlin
- 2010 · Baby ouh!
- 2012 · Cactus versus Brezel
- 2016 · Les Hormones
- 2019 · Ah! Quel Cinéma!

=== Compilations ===
- 1998 · Stereo Total
- 2000 · Total Pop
- 2002 · Trésors cachés [Hidden Treasures] [available free on their website]
- 2003 · Party Anticonformiste
- 2003 · Party Anticonformista
- 2007 · Party Anticonformiste (The Bungalow Years)
- 2008 · Grandes Exitos
- 2009 · No Controles
- 2009 · Carte postale de Montréal
- 2015 · Yéyé Existentialiste

=== Soundtrack appearances ===
- 2011 · Underwater Love (Onna no kappa) (Shinji Imaoka)
- 2014 · Ruined Heart: Another Lovestory Between a Criminal & a Whore (Pusong Wasak) (Khavn De La Cruz)

=== Remix album ===
- 2006 · Discotheque
