= Rocket from the Crypt discography =

- Studio albums: 7
- Extended plays: 2
- Live albums: 1
- Compilation albums: 4
- Singles: 6
- Video albums: 2
- Music videos: 8
- Vinyl singles: 23
- Other appearances: 16

The discography of Rocket from the Crypt, a San Diego–based alternative rock band active from 1990 to 2005, consists of seven studio albums, two EPs, one live album, two DVDs, twenty-eight singles, and eight music videos.

Rocket from the Crypt was formed in 1990 with an initial lineup of singer/guitarist John Reis (Speedo), guitarist Andy Stamets (ND), bassist Pete Reichert (Petey X), drummer Sean, and backing vocalist Elaina. Their debut album, Paint as a Fragrance, was released in 1991 through the Cargo Music imprint Headhunter Records. Sean and Elaina then moved away from San Diego and drummer Adam Willard (Atom) and saxophonist Paul O'Beirne (Apollo 9) joined. The band released a series of vinyl singles on various independent record labels, followed by their second album, Circa: Now!, on Headhunter in 1992. Trumpeter Jason Crane (JC 2000) joined the band just as Circa: Now! attracted the attention of major record labels. Rocket from the Crypt signed with Interscope Records, who re-released Circa: Now! while Cargo released All Systems Go, a compilation album of the band's vinyl singles.

The band's contract with Interscope included the freedom to record vinyl releases for other labels. They had three releases in 1995: The EP The State of Art is on Fire, the LP Hot Charity, and the album Scream, Dracula, Scream! The singles "Born in '69" and "Young Livers" reached the UK Singles Chart at #68 and #67 respectively. "On a Rope" was a greater success, reaching #12. Music videos for all three singles were played on MTV and MTV Europe, and Scream, Dracula, Scream! peaked at #41 on the UK Albums Chart. RFTC was released in 1998 but did not fare as well as its predecessor, reaching only #63 while its lead single "Lipstick" reached #64. Rocket from the Crypt left Interscope in 1999 and released the EP Cut Carefully and Play Loud independently. Disagreements over the band's direction led to Willard leaving the group, and the band took a hiatus during which Reis founded Swami Records and released All Systems Go 2.

Rocket from the Crypt next signed to Vagrant Records and released Group Sounds in 2001, including contributions from Superchunk drummer Jon Wurster as well as their new permanent drummer Mario Rubalcaba (Ruby Mars). Group Sounds was their first album to chart in their home country, reaching #40 on Billboard's Top Independent Albums chart. Live from Camp X-Ray followed in 2002 and reached #45. It proved to be their final studio album, as the members drifted into other projects over the next few years and decided to disband. Rocket from the Crypt's final performance on Halloween 2005 in San Diego was filmed and recorded, and was released in 2008 as R.I.P. All Systems Go 3 followed that same year, and Reis plans to eventually release a fourth, final installment in the series. In October 2011 the band reunited for the children's television Yo Gabba Gabba! where they would perform a brand new song titled "He's a Chef" which was released as a limited edition single exclusively through Volcom clothing stores and later on the 2017 compilation Yo Gabba Gabba! Hey!. A reunion tour followed in 2012. In March 2015 Vintage Piss was released under Sonny Vincent and Rocket from the Crypt. Rocket from the Crypt, minus the horn section, served as Vincent's backing band. The album was originally recorded in 2003 but left unmixed and unfinished until Reis, who also produced the album, decided to go back and give the album a proper mixing and release

== Studio albums ==
Year	Album details	Peak chart positions	
Year	Album details	US (Top Independent Albums)	UK
1991	Paint as a Fragrance: Released: February 1991; Label: Headhunter (HED #003); Format: CD, CS, LP	—	—
1992	Circa: Now!^{[I]}: Released: November 1992; Label: Headhunter (HED #015-2); Format: CD, CS, LP	—	—
1995	Hot Charity^{[II]}: Released: August 8, 1995; Label: Perfect Sound; Format: LP	—	—
1995	Scream, Dracula, Scream!: Released: October 10, 1995; Label: Interscope (INT #92596-2); Format: CD, LP	—	41
1998	RFTC: Released: June 2, 1998; Label: Interscope (INT #90167); Format: CD, LP	—	63
2001	Group Sounds: Released: March 6, 2001; Label: Vagrant (VR #352); Format: CD, LP	40	—
2002	Live from Camp X-Ray^{[III]}: Released: October 22, 2002; Label: Vagrant (VR #377); Format: CD, LP	45	—
"—" denotes albums that were released but did not chart.

I Circa: Now! was reissued on CD by Interscope in 1993, and again in 2004 by Swami as Circa: Now! +4.

II Hot Charity was reissued on CD by Swami in 2002 on the compilation album Hot Charity / Cut Carefully and Play Loud.

III Despite its title, Live from Camp X-Ray is a studio album rather than a live album.

== Live album ==
Year	Album details
2008	R.I.P.^{[I]}: Released: February 26, 2008; Label: Vagrant (VR #461); Formats: CD, DVD

I R.I.P. is a CD/DVD combination package.

== Compilation albums ==
Year	Album details
1993	All Systems Go^{[I]}: Released: February 1993; Label: Toy's Factory; Formats: CD, LP
1999	All Systems Go 2: Released: October 26, 1999; Label: Swami (SWA #2001); Formats: CD, LP
2002	Hot Charity / Cut Carefully and Play Loud^{[II]}: Released: July 16, 2002; Label: Swami (SWA #112); Formats: CD
2008	All Systems Go 3: Released: August 28, 2008; Label: Vagrant (VR #508); Formats: CD

I All Systems Go was initially released only in Japan. A second version with a different track list was released in the United States by Cargo Music later the same year. This version was re-released by Sympathy for the Record Industry in 1998.

II Hot Charity / Cut Carefully and Play Loud combines the LP Hot Charity and the EP Cut Carefully and Play Loud.

== Extended plays ==
Year	Album details
1995	The State of Art Is on Fire^{[I]}: Released: April 1995; Label: Sympathy for the Record Industry (SFTRI #320); Format: EP
1999	Cut Carefully and Play Loud^{[II]}: Released: November 16, 1999; Label: Flapping Jet; Format: EP

I The State of Art Is on Fire was reissued on CD in 1996, including the tracks from Rocket from the Crypt Plays the Music Machine.

II Cut Carefully and Play Loud was reissued on CD by Swami in 2002 on the compilation album Hot Charity / Cut Carefully and Play Loud.

== Singles ==
Rocket from the Crypt released 28 singles on both vinyl and CD formats during their career, but only six of these were commercially released singles intended to promote specific songs from their albums. The remaining 22 were vinyl-only singles and are listed below under "Vinyl singles". Promotional singles of "Ditch Digger" and "Sturdy Wrists" from Circa: Now! were released to radio stations for airplay, but these were not released as commercial singles.

Year	Single	Peak chart positions	Album
Year	Single	UK	Album
1995	"Born in '69"	68	Scream, Dracula, Scream!
1996	"Young Livers"	67	Scream, Dracula, Scream!
1996	"On a Rope"	12	Scream, Dracula, Scream!
1998	"When in Rome (Do the Jerk)"	—	RFTC
1998	"Lipstick"	64	RFTC
1998	"Break It Up"	—	RFTC
"—" denotes singles that were released but did not chart.

== Vinyl singles ==
Rocket from the Crypt released 22 singles during their career that were exclusive to the vinyl format. Most of these were released in limited numbers and were not distributed to radio stations for airplay, unlike the 6 singles which were released to promote specific songs from their studio albums. Many of the tracks from the vinyl singles were re-released on the All Systems Go compilation albums, as noted below.

Year	Release details	Tracks	Notes
1991	Rocket Pack: Released: September 1991; Label: Pusmort (#200772); Format: 7" single	1. "Cut It Loose"^{[II]}; 2. "Glazed"	Released in 2 versions, one by the band and the other for the Pushead fan club. The title was derived from the felt cover in the shape of the band's logo which folded around the record. 125 copies were manufactured, but only 75 were released in this package. The remaining copies were used for the split release with Septic Death.
1992	Yum Kippered: Released: June 1992; Label: Helter Skelter (HS #92712); Format: 7" single	1. "Bad Ninja"; 2. "Goodbye"; 3. "Kill the Funk (There Will Be No Funk in Outer Space)"	
1992	"Boychucker": Released: June 1992; Label: Sympathy for the Record Industry (SFTRI #179); Format: 7" single	1. "Boychucker"^{[I]}; 2. "Jumper K Balls"^{[I]}; 3. "Lefty"^{[I]}	Picture disc with artwork by Rick Froberg. Reissued in 1994 as a standard record, but with a new sleeve containing Rocket from the Crypt pogs.
1992	Sub Pop Singles Club: Released: June 1992; Label: Sub Pop (SP #154); Format: 7" single	1. "Normal Carpet Ride"^{[I]}; 2. "Where Are the Fuckers"^{[I]}; 3. "Slumber Queen"^{[I]}; 4. "Flip the Bird"^{[I]}	Limited to 3,000 copies.
1992	"Gold": Released: July 1992; Label: Drunken Fish (DFR #02); Format: 7" single	1. "Gold"	Originally performed by the MC5.
1992	Rocket from the Crypt / Septic Death: Released: August 1992; Label: Pusmort; Format: 2x 7" singles	1. "Cut It Loose"^{[II]}; 2. "Glazed"	Released only in Japan and limited to 100 copies. Includes 2 records, one from each band.
1992	Smells Like Grease for Peace: Released: October 1992; Label: Standard Recordings (SR #72); Format: 7" single	1. "Cha Cha Cha"^{[I]}	Split release with Rocket from the Crypt on side A and Deadbolt's "Down in the Lab" on side B.
1993	Both Good Songs: Released: April 1993; Label: Merge (MRG #035); Format: 7" single	1. "Pigeon Eater"^{[I]}; 2. "(The) Paste That You Love"^{[I]}	
1993	Pure Genius: Released: 1993; Label: Drunken Fish (DFR #05); Format: 7" single	1. "Pure Genius"^{[I]}; 2. "Lift and Love"^{[I]}	
1993	Radio Wendy / Rocket from the Crypt: Released: 1993; Label: Pusmort (#400777); Format: 7" single	1. "Call It a Complex"	Split release with both bands' songs on side A (side B is blank). Limited to 417 copies, released in 3 versions with different colored sleeves, only to the Pushead fan club.
1993	Ghetto Box Rock: Released: 1993; Label: Snap Crackle Punk (SCP #001); Format: 7" single	1. "Lie"; 2. "Video Reign Man"	Single-sided release with a blank B side. Limited to 2,500 copies included with issue #4 of Speed Kills magazine. Another 2,500 copies were reissued later that year. Both songs recorded in the band's rehearsal space using a ghetto blaster.
1994	Burn Mouth Off Liar with Punk Heat Blast: Released: 1994; Label: Merge (MRG #049); Format: 7" single	1. "UFO UFO UFO"^{[II]}; 2. "Birdman"^{[II]}	Reissued in 1998.
1994	Rocket from the Crypt / Bloodthirsty Butchers: Released: 1994; Label: Pusmort; Format: 2x 7" singles	1. "Cut It Loose"^{[II]}; 2. "On Living and Dying"; 3. "Pressure's On"^{[I]}	Split release including two records, one from each band. "Pressure's On" originally performed by Red C.
1995	Rocket from the Crypt Plays the Music Machine: Released: 1995; Label: Sympathy for the Record Industry (SFTRI #373); Format: 5" single	1. "Trouble"; 2. "Masculine Intuition"	Both songs originally performed by The Music Machine. Reissued in 1996 as a 7" single. Both tracks were included on the CD release of The State of Art is on Fire.
1995	"Tattoo": Released: 1995; Label: Perfect Sound; Format: 7" single	1. "Tattoo"	Single-sided release with a blank B side. Released exclusively to members of "Speedo's Army", a club of registered fans with Rocket from the Crypt tattoos.
1995	"I Flame You": Released: 1995; Label: Perfect Sound; Format: 7" single	1. "I Flame You"	Single-sided release with the band's name and artwork etched on the surface of the B side. Released exclusively to the band's fan club.
1996	"Used" / "Lose Your Clown": Released: 1996; Label: Dinked; Format: 7" single	1. "Used"; 2. "Lose Your Clown"^{[II]}	Given away at two in-store performances in London and to members of "Speedo's Army". Unmarked jukebox single limited to 150-200 copies. "Lose Your Clown" originally performed by Ray Charles.
1998	Rocket from the Crypt / Julian Briano y Sus Hermanos: Released: 1998; Label: Vinyl Communications; Format: 7" single	1. "Lumps"	
1999	Rocket from the Crypt / The Hellacopters: Released: October 1999; Label: Gearhead Magazine; Format: 7" single	1. "Delorean"	Split release packaged inside issue #10 of Gearhead magazine.
1999	Dancing Birds: Released: December 1999; Label: Glazed (GLZ #001); Format: 7" single	1. "Black Eye"; 2. "Bombs Away"	Limited to 2,750 copies. An additional 1,650 copies were reissued in April 2000.
2000	Rocket from the Crypt / The Get Up Kids: Released: December 19, 2000; Label: Vagrant (VR #351); Format: 7" single	1. "Free Language Demons"	
2003	"On the Prowl" / "Come On": Released: 2003; Label: Sympathy for the Record Industry (SFTRI #666); Format: 7" single	1. "On the Prowl"; 2. "Come On"	
2012	Biz Markie & Wayne Coyne / Rocket From The Crypt: Released: 2012; Label: Volcom; Format: 7" single	1. "I Can't Believe It's Really Happening"; 2. "He's a Chef"; 3. "I Can't Believe It's Really Happening (remix)"	Split release limited-edition green marbled 7-inch released as part of Yo Gabba Gabba!'s clothing and accessories collaboration with Volcom. Rocket from the Crypt's "He's a Chef" is featured as the double A side.

I Denotes songs that were re-released on the US version of All Systems Go.

II Denotes songs that were re-released on All Systems Go 2.

== Video albums ==
Year	Video details
2006	RFTC 10/31/05^{[I]}: Released: October 2006; Label: Swami; Formats: DVD
2008	R.I.P.^{[II]}: Released: February 26, 2008; Label: Vagrant (VR #461); Formats: CD, DVD

I RFTC 10/31/05 is a "rough cut" version of R.I.P. released in limited quantities.

II R.I.P. is a CD/DVD combination package.

== Music videos ==
Year	Title	Director	Album
1992	"Ditch Digger"	Spike Jonze	Circa: Now!
1993	"Sturdy Wrists"		Circa: Now!
1995	"Born in '69"	Steve Hanft	Scream, Dracula, Scream!
1996	"Young Livers"		Scream, Dracula, Scream!
1996	"On a Rope"	Gavin Bowden	Scream, Dracula, Scream!
1998	"Lipstick"		RFTC
1998	"Break It Up"		RFTC
2002	"I Can't Feel My Head"	Marc Gariss	Live from Camp X-Ray

== Other appearances ==
The following Rocket from the Crypt songs were released on compilation albums, soundtracks, and other releases. Some songs were later re-released on the All Systems Go compilation albums, as noted below. This is not an exhaustive list: songs that were first released on the band's albums, EPs, or singles are not included.

Year	Release details	Track(s)
1992	Head Start to Purgatory: Released: 1992; Label: Headhunter (HED #010); Format: CD	"Nail Biter / Battery Licker"
1993	Happy Birthday, Baby Jesus: Released: 1993; Label: Sympathy for the Record Industry (SFTRI #396); Format: CD	"Cancel Christmas"
1994	Compulsiv for Two: Released: 1994; Label: Compulsiv (CPS #012); Format: EP	"Call It a Clue"^{[I]}
1994	Ether Hogg: Snivelization: Released: 1994; Label: Sympathy for the Record Industry (SFTRI #327); Format: CD	"Lumps"; "Rise from the Dead"
1997	Dope, Guns, 'n' Fucking in the Streets, Vol. 11: Released: 1997; Label: Amphetamine Reptile; Format: 7" single	"Tiger Mask"
1998	Halloween Hootenanny: Released: October 13, 1998; Label: Geffen/DGC; Format: CD, 12" LP	"I Drink Blood"^{[I]}
1999	Squeal of Blurr Number 2: Released: January 1999; Label: Blurr (Blurr #016); Format: 12" LP	"Watusi '98"
1999	Oh, Merge: Released: July 1999; Label: Merge (MRG #161); Format: CD	"Man Down"^{[II]}
1999	Before You Were Punk 2: Released: August 24, 1999; Label: Vagrant (VR #399); Format: CD	"This Way Out"^{[II]} (originally performed by Wall of Voodoo)
1999	Kiss the Cook: Released: August 31, 1999; Label: Rock 105.3; Format: CD	"Who Needs You"^{[I]}
2000	Free the West Memphis 3: Released: October 10, 2000; Label: Koch; Format: CD	"Wrong and Important"
2000	Another Year on the Streets: Released: October 31, 2000; Label: Vagrant; Format: CD	"Chariots on Fire"
2001	Another Year on the Streets Volume 2: Released: December 18, 2001; Label: Vagrant; Format: CD	"Alone"
2003	Swami Sound System Vol. 1: Released: Label: Swami; Format: CD	"California Lights"
2004	Another Year on the Streets, Vol. 3: Released: June 22, 2004; Label: Vagrant; Format: CD	"Flight of the Hobo"^{[III]}
2015	Vintage Piss: Released: March 20, 2015; Label: Swami; Format: CD, LP, digital download	Entire album. Released as Sonny Vincent and Rocket from the Crypt.^{[IV]}
2017	Yo Gabba Gabba! Hey!: Released: May 26, 2017; Label: DHX Music; Format: CD, LP, digital download	"He's a Chef"

I Denotes songs that were re-released on All Systems Go 2.

II Denotes songs that were re-released on All Systems Go 3.

III "Flight of the Hobo" was also released on Circa: Now! +4 later the same year.

IV Originally recorded in 2003 but never mixed or finished. The band, minus the horn section, serves as Vincent's backing band. Reis went back and mixed and completed the album in 2015.
