= All Systems Go 2 =

Compilation album by Rocket from the Crypt
- Released: October 26, 1999
- Genre: Punk rock, rock and roll
- Length: 1:00:24
- Label: Swami
- Producer: John Reis

Rocket from the Crypt chronology
RFTC (1998)	All Systems Go 2 (1999)	Cut Carefully and Play Loud (1999)

Professional ratings
Review scores
Source	Rating
Allmusic	4/5 stars

All Systems Go 2 is a compilation album by the San Diego, California rock band Rocket from the Crypt, released in 1999 by singer/guitarist John Reis' record label Swami Records. The album collects songs from 13 different recording sessions which were previously only available on 7" vinyl singles, compilations, and as B-sides, as well as some new and unreleased material.

The album is the second in the band's series of rarities compilations, the first having been released in 1993. A third installment was released in 2008.

== Track listing ==
1. "Tarzan"
2. "UFO, UFO, UFO"
3. "Birdman"
4. "¡Ciao Patsy!"
5. "Heads Are Gonna Roll"
6. "Cheetah"
7. "Turkish Revenge"
8. "U.S. Aim"
9. "Raped by Ape"
10. "Crack Party"
11. "Strangehold"
12. "10 Forward"
13. "Call it a Clue"
14. "Cut it Loose"
15. "Hot Heart"
16. "I Drink Blood"
17. "Slow"
18. "Who Needs You" (originally performed by The Real Kids)
19. "Alergic Reaction" (originally performed by The Drags)
20. "You and I" (originally performed by The Silver Apples)
21. "Transcendent Crankiness" (originally performed by The Nephews)
22. "Lose Your Clown" (originally performed by Ray Charles)
23. "Burning Army Men"
24. "Ballot Fire"
25. "Nobobby"

== Performers ==
- Speedo (John Reis) - guitar, lead vocals
- ND (Andy Stamets) - guitar, backing vocals
- Petey X (Pete Reichert) - bass, backing vocals
- Apollo 9 (Paul O'Beirne) - saxophone, percussion, backing vocals
- JC 2000 (Jason Crane) - trumpet, percussion, backing vocals
- Atom (Adam Willard) - drums

=== Additional musicians ===
- Chris Prescott - conga drums on "Tarzan" and "Heads Are Gonna Roll"
- Mitch Wilson and Gary Shufler - backing vocals on "Tarzan" and "Heads Are Gonna Roll"
- Holly Golightly and Dustin Milsap - additional vocals on tracks 6–10

== Album information ==
- Record label: Swami Records
- All songs written by Rocket From the Crypt except "Who Needs You" by the Real Kids, "Alergic Reaction" by The Drags, "You and I" by The Silver Apples, "Transcendent Crankiness" by The Nephews, and "Lose Your Clown" by Ray Charles
- Mastered by Rafter
- All songs published by Mr. Buttermaker Painting, BMI except tracks 18–22
- Layout by Marc Gariss
- Tracks 1–5, 7–16, 18–24 were previously released on CD & vinyl singles (see Song Information below)
- Tracks 6, 17 & 25 were unreleased prior to their inclusion on this album

== Song details ==
"Tarzan" and "Heads Are Gonna Roll" were recorded with Mark Trombino at Big Fish Recorders in San Diego around the time the band was touring in support of RFTC. They use exotic percussion instruments such as thumb harps and rainsticks. Mitch Wilson and Gary Shufler sing backing vocals, while Chris Prescott plays conga drums. "Tarzan" originally appeared on a shaped picture disc single for the song "When in Rome (Do the Jerk)", while "Heads Are Gonna Roll" appeared on the single for "Lipstick". Both singles were released in the UK by Elemental Records in 1998.

"UFO, UFO, UFO", "Birdman", "10 Forward", and "Call it a Clue" were recorded with Donnell Cameron at Westbeach Recorders in Los Angeles as part of a "12 songs in 3 days" marathon recording session. "UFO, UFO, UFO" and "Birdman" originally appeared on the 7" single Burn Mouth Off Liar With Punk Heat Blast released by Merge Records in 1994. "10 Forward" appeared on the Japanese release of All Systems Go. "Call It A Clue" appeared on the 7" compilation Compulsiv For Two in 1994. The title of "UFO, UFO, UFO" was inspired by Long Gone John's story of his cousin who tattooed the letters "UFO" on his body over 425 times.

"¡Ciao Patsy!" originally appeared on a single for the song "Born in '69", released in 1995 by Elemental Records. It was recorded in an abandoned karate dojo in Silverlake, California by Donnell Cameron and was mixed by Mark Trombino.

"Cheetah", "Turkish Revenge", "U.S. Aim", "Raped by Ape", and "Crack Party" were recorded at Milton Keynes' Linford Manor with Holly Golightly and Dustin Milsap singing backing vocals. "Cheetah" is a previously unreleased version, while the other 4 songs appeared on 2 separate CD singles for the song "Break it Up", released by Elemental Records in 1998.

"Strangehold" was recorded at Hot Rox in Cincinnati by John Reis, using the pseudonym "Slasher" that he also uses when performing in the Sultans). It originally appeared on an Elemental Records single for "Lipstick" in 1998.

"Cut it Loose" originally appeared on a Rocket Pack promotional vinyl 7" single released by Pusmort Records in 1991 that also included an early version of "Glazed." This same pressing was also used for a split release with Septic Death in 1992, and "Cut it Loose" reappeared on a split release with Bloodthirsty Butchers in 1994. "Cut it Loose" was one of four songs recorded with Donnell Cameron at Westbeach Recorders during a session funded by Pushead for releases on his Pusmort label. Another song from this session, "Pressure's On," appeared on the split with Bloodthirsty Butchers and also on the first volume of All Systems Go. These songs were recorded before saxophonist Apollo 9 joined the band, and were the band's first recordings with drummer Atom.

"Hot Heart" was taken from performance reel masters and was previously released on a promotional CD that was included with some copies of the RFTC album.

"I Drink Blood" was recorded at Manville Studios in Sorrento Valley and originally appeared on a compilation entitled Halloween Hootenanny in 1998.

"Slow", "Who Needs You", "Alergic Reaction", "You and I", "Transcendent Crankiness", and "Lose Your Clown" were recorded at Saturation Studios with Geoff Harrington, Mark Arnold, or Mike McHugh. "Slow" is an original song and was unreleased prior to its inclusion on All Systems Go 2, while for the rest each band member chose an existing song to cover and these appeared on a 3-CD single set for the song "On a Rope" released by Elemental Records in the UK in 1996. "Lose Your Clown" was JC 2000's choice but was did not appear on the "On a Rope" singles; it instead appeared on a 7" vinyl jukebox single for "Used" that was pressed by Dinked Records in 1996. 150-200 copies were given away at 2 in-store performances in London, while the rest were distributed to members of "Speedo's Army", a registered organization of fans with Rocket from the Crypt tattoos. "Who Needs You" was originally performed by the Real Kids, "Alergic Reaction" by The Drags, "You and I" by The Silver Apples, "Transcendent Crankiness" by The Nephews, and "Lose Your Clown" by Ray Charles. Though the original version of "Lose Your Clown" has vocals, the band decided to leave this version as an instrumental.

"Burning Army Men" originally appeared on a single for "Young Livers" released in both CD and 7" vinyl formats by Elemental Records in 1996.

"Ballot Fire" had previously appeared on the Japanese release of All Systems Go where it is listed as having been recorded with Anthony Arvizu at Mambo Recorders in Long Beach, California.
