= All Systems Go 3 =

Compilation album by Rocket from the Crypt
- Released: August 28, 2008
- Genre: Punk rock, rock and roll
- Label: Vagrant/Swami
- Producer: John Reis

Rocket from the Crypt chronology
R.I.P. (2008)	All Systems Go 3 (2008)

All Systems Go 3 is a compilation album by the San Diego, California rock band Rocket from the Crypt, released by Vagrant Records and Swami Records August 28, 2008, nearly three years following the band's breakup. It collects songs recorded from 1997 to 2000 on 8-track in the band's practice space. Many of the tracks were previously unreleased and became available for the first time on this album. All Systems Go 3 includes contributions from original drummer Atom Willard as well as Chris Prescott and Tony DiPrima, both of whom filled in after Willard left the group in 1999.

Singer/guitarist John Reis describes the album as "violent, aggressive and thuggish stuff and to me sounds much better now in retrospect than when we originally were recording these demos...Thematically, musically, etc. it's all very period to an undocumented part of the bands history...I really believe if the band was still around, we would make a record at least sonically similar to ASG 3."

The album is the third in the band's series of rarities compilations, the first having been released in 1993 and the second in 1999. A fourth and final installment is being prepared and will consist of a CD/DVD combination package.

== Track listing ==
1. "Falling Down Stairs" - 2:01
2. "Total Bummer" - 3:01
3. "Chariots on Fire" (demo) - 2:36
4. "Little Shaver" - 3:51
5. "Canyon Killer" - 1:53
6. "Don't Wanna Be Touched" - 3:04
7. "Orange County" - 2:57
8. "Pictures of Lenny" - 1:33
9. "Man Down" - 0:34
10. "Summer Survivor" - 2:58
11. "Luck is the New 13" - 2:38
12. "Tiger Mask" (instrumental) - 2:10
13. "When in Rome (Do the Jerk)" (demo) - 4:03
14. "Dick on a Dog" (demo) - 3:10
15. "Dynamite!" - 2:51
16. "Due Warning" - 2:54
17. "The Whip" - 2:51
18. "Come on Everybody" - 1:17
19. "No Way at All" - 1:34
20. "This Way Out" (originally performed by Wall of Voodoo) - 2:49

== Performers ==
- Speedo (John Reis) - guitar, lead vocals
- ND (Andy Stamets) - guitar, backing vocals
- Petey X (Pete Reichert) - bass, backing vocals
- Apollo 9 (Paul O'Beirne) - saxophone, backing vocals, harmonica on track 4
- Atom (Adam Willard) - drums on tracks 1, 2, 4–7, 9, 10, 12–14, 16, 17, 19, and 20
- JC 2000 (Jason Crane) -trumpet, percussion, backing vocals

=== Additional musicians ===
- Chris Prescott - drums on tracks 3 and 15
- Tony DiPrima - drums on tracks 8, 11, and 18

== Song details ==
- "Falling Down Stairs" was recorded in 1996 or 1997 and was influenced by Discharge.
- "Total Bummer" is an early version of "Wrong and Important", which was released on the compilation album Free the West Memphis 3 in 2000.
- "Chariots on Fire" was recorded with Chris Prescott on drums and appeared on the Vagrant Records compilation Another Year on the Streets in 2000. A re-recorded version appeared on the UK release of Group Sounds.
- The lyrics to "Canyon Killer" were inspired by the fact that the band's rehearsal space, called Drag Racist Studios, was located in a mostly undeveloped basin that frequently had to be evacuated due to flooding or fire.
- The lyrics to "Orange County" were inspired by the San Diego California Temple of the Church of Jesus Christ of Latter-day Saints which was built near the studio.
- "Pictures of Lenny" was recorded with Tony DiPrima on drums, with lyrics inspired by the Phil Spector biography He's a Rebel.
- "Man Down" is the shortest song in Rocket from the Crypt's catalog and originally appeared on the compilation Oh, Merge in 1999.
- "Tiger Mask" appeared in its finished form with lyrics on the compilation Dope, Guns, 'n' Fucking in the Streets, Vol. 11 in 1997.
- The finished studio versions of "When in Rome (Do the Jerk)" and "Dick on a Dog" appeared on the band's 1998 album RFTC.
- "Dynamite!" was recorded with Chris Prescott on drums and appeared in the 2000 surf film Hit & Run, directed by Taylor Steele.
- "The Whip" was recorded for a compilation album released by Your Flesh magazine.
- "This Way Out" originally appeared on the compilation Before You Were Punk 2 and is a cover of a Wall of Voodoo song.
