= All Systems Go (Rocket from the Crypt album) =

Compilation album by Rocket from the Crypt
- Released: 1993 (re-released 1998)
- Genre: Punk rock
- Length: 54:14
- Label: original release: Cargo/Headhunter re-release: Sympathy for the Record Industry; Japanese version: Toys' Factory
- Producer: John Reis

Rocket from the Crypt chronology
Circa: Now! (1992)	All Systems Go (1993)	The State of Art is on Fire (1995)

Alternative cover
- Japanese release cover by Pushead

Professional ratings
Review scores
Source	Rating
Allmusic	3/5 stars
MusicHound Rock	4.5/5 stars

All Systems Go is a compilation album by American punk rock band Rocket from the Crypt, released in 1993 by Cargo Records and Headhunter Records. The album collects songs which were previously only available on 7-inch vinyl singles, as well as some new and unreleased material.

The first version of All Systems Go was a Japan-only release in February 1993 intended as an introduction to the band to coincide with their Japanese tour, since most of their vinyl releases were not available in Japan. Because the Japanese CD contained many rare songs previously only available on vinyl, imported copies began turning up at record stores in the United States at exorbitant prices. Recognizing the desire of their American fanbase to get these songs on CD without paying expensive import fees, the band reworked the track list and released a different version of All Systems Go in the US containing tracks that were hard to find stateside.

In 1998 Sympathy for the Record Industry re-released the US version of All Systems Go, making it widely available nationwide for the first time. The following year Rocket from the Crypt singer–guitarist John Reis released a sequel compilation entitled All Systems Go 2 on his Swami Records label. A third installment in the series was released in 2008.

== Track listing ==
All tracks are written by John Reis, Andy Stamets, Pete Reichert, Paul O'Beirne, and Adam Willard, except where noted.

Japanese release
No.	Title	Length
1.	"Pigeon Eater" (from Both Good Songs, 1993)
2.	"10 Forward" (first appeared here)
3.	"Call It a Complex" (from Radio Wendy / Rocket from the Crypt, 1993; only CD appearance)
4.	"Goodbye" (re-recording of a song from Yum Kippered, 1992; first appeared here)
5.	"Pure Genius" (from Pure Genius, 1993)
6.	"Press Darlings" (first appeared here; written by Adam Ant; originally performed by Adam and the Ants)
7.	"Killy Kill" (re-recording of a song from Circa: Now!, 1992; first appeared here)
8.	"Pressure's On" (first appeared here; written by Peter Murray; originally performed by Red C)
9.	"Where Are the Fuckers" (from Sub Pop Singles Club, 1992)
10.	"Slumber Queen" (from Sub Pop Singles Club, 1992)
11.	"Boychucker" (from Boychucker, 1992)
12.	"Jumper K. Balls" (from Boychucker, 1992)
13.	"Ballot Fire" (first appeared here)
14.	"Cha Cha Cha" (from Smells Like Grease for Peace, 1992)
15.	"Gold" (from Gold, 1992; only CD appearance; written by Wayne Kramer, Fred "Sonic" Smith, Rob Tyner, and Dennis Thompson; originally performed by the MC5)

American release
No.	Title	Length
1.	"Live the Funk" (re-recording of a song from Yum Kippered, 1992; exclusive to this release)
2.	"Bad Song Ninja" (re-recording of a song from Yum Kippered, 1992; exclusive to this release)
3.	"Goodbye" (re-recording of a song from Yum Kippered, 1992; first appeared on Japanese release)
4.	"Boychucker" (from Boychucker, 1992)
5.	"Jumper K. Balls" (from Boychucker, 1992)
6.	"Lefty" (from Boychucker, 1992)
7.	"Normal Carpet Ride" (from Sub Pop Singles Club, 1992)
8.	"Where Are the Fuckers" (from Sub Pop Singles Club, 1992)
9.	"Slumber Queen" (from Sub Pop Singles Club, 1992)
10.	"Flip the Bird" (from Sub Pop Singles Club, 1992)
11.	"Cha Cha Cha" (from Smells Like Grease for Peace, 1992)
12.	"Pressure's On" (first appeared on Japanese release; written by Peter Murray; originally performed by Red C)
13.	"Pigeon Eater" (from Both Good Songs, 1993)
14.	"(The) Paste That You Love" (from Both Good Songs, 1993)
15.	"Pure Genius" (from Pure Genius, 1993)
16.	"Lift and Love" (from Pure Genius, 1993)
17.	"Press Darlings" (first appeared on Japanese release; written by Adam Ant; originally performed by Adam and the Ants)
18.	"Killy Kill Again" (re-recording of a song from Circa: Now!, 1992; first appeared on Japanese release)
19.	"Chantilly Face" (exclusive to this release; written by Jerry Foster, Bill Rice, and The Big Bopper; originally performed by The Big Bopper)

== Personnel ==
- Speedo (John Reis) – guitar, lead vocals
- ND (Andy Stamets) – guitar, backing vocals
- Petey X (Pete Reichert) – bass, backing vocals
- Apollo 9 (Paul O'Beirne) – saxophone, percussion, backing vocals
- Atom (Adam Willard) – drums

=== Additional musicians ===
- K'londo – keyboards on "Goodbye"

== Album information ==
- Record label:
  - Japanese version: Toy's Factory Records
  - original US release: Cargo Records/Headhunter Records
  - 1998 re-release: Sympathy for the Record Industry
- All songs written by Rocket from the Crypt except "Pressure's On" by Red C, "Press Darlings" by Adam and the Ants, and "Chantilly Face" by the Big Bopper
- Tracks 4–16 were previously released on 7-inch vinyl singles (see Song Information below)
- Tracks 1–3 and 17–19 were unreleased prior to their inclusion on this album

== Song information ==
- "Live the Funk"
- "Bad Song Ninja"
- "Goodbye"

These 3 songs are re-recordings of the songs "Kill the Funk (There Will Be No Funk in Outer Space)", "Bad Ninja", and "Goodbye", which appeared on the band's first 7-inch vinyl single Yum Kippered, released by the Italian label Helter Skelter Records in 1991. Due to a misunderstanding between Helter Skelter and the band's other label, Cargo/Headhunter, the band were given very few copies of the record and had no control over the amount pressed or sold. Unsatisfied with the mastering job, the band re-recorded the first two tracks at Hit Single Studios in San Diego and the third track at Westbeach Recorders in Los Angeles, giving them slightly different titles. These versions were unreleased before their inclusion on All Systems Go.

- "Boychucker"
- "Jumper K. Balls"
- "Lefty"

These 3 songs originally appeared on the Boychucker 7-inch vinyl single released by Sympathy for the Record Industry in June 1992. "Boychucker" and "Jumper K. Balls" were recorded by Anthony Arvizu at Mambo Recorders in Long Beach. Reis states in the All Systems Go liner notes that the title "Jumper K. Balls" was inspired by Australian band Venom P. Stinger. "Lefty" came from a recording session for Back Off Cupids, a band in which Reis collaborated with future Rocket trumpeter JC 2000 in 1991.

- "Normal Carpet Ride"
- "Where Are the Fuckers"
- "Slumber Queen"
- "Flip the Bird"

These 4 songs originally appeared on the Normal Carpet Ride 7-inch vinyl single released by Sub Pop in June 1992 as part of the Sub Pop Singles Club series. "Normal Carpet Ride" was recorded by Donnell Cameron at Westbeach Recorders in Los Angeles around the time the band recorded the Circa: Now! album, and remixed for All Systems Go at Hit Single. "Where Are the Fuckers" and "Slumber Queen" were recorded at Mambo Recorders and were originally written by Reis at age 15 for his band Conservative Itch. "Flip the Bird" came from a Back Off Cupids recording session.

- "Cha Cha Cha"

This song originally appeared on the Smells Like Grease for Peace split 7-inch vinyl single with Deadbolt, released by Standard Recordings in October 1992. It was recorded at Mambo Recorders.

- "Pressure's On"

This song is one of 4 recorded for vinyl singles on Pusmort Records, but is the only one to appear on All Systems Go (the other 3 have not been released). These songs were at Westbeach Recorders before saxophonist Apollo 9 joined the band, and were the band's first recordings with drummer Atom. "Pressure's On" is a cover of the song by the Washington, DC hardcore band Red C. It was unreleased before its inclusion on All Systems Go, but later appeared on a double split 7-inch with the band Bloodthirsty Butchers in 1994.

- "Pigeon Eater"
- "The Paste That You Love"

These 2 songs originally appeared on the Both Good Songs 7-inch vinyl single released by Merge Records in April 1993. Both songs were recorded at Westbeach Recorders.

- "Pure Genius"
- "Lift and Love"

These 2 songs originally appeared on the Pure Genius 7-inch vinyl single released by Drunken Fish Records in 1993. Both songs were recorded at Westbeach Recorders.

- "Press Darlings"

This song was recorded for a split 7-inch with Superchunk which never materialized. It is a cover of the song by Adam and the Ants. It was unreleased before its inclusion on All Systems Go. It was recorded at Westbeach Recorders.

- "Killy Kill Again"

This is a re-recording of the song "Killy Kill" from the band's 1992 album Circa: Now!. The band re-recorded the song in 1993. It was recorded at Westbeach Recorders, and it was unreleased before its inclusion on All Systems Go.

- "Chantilly Face"

This is a semi-cover of the song "Chantilly Lace", originally performed by The Big Bopper. In this version the original song is played, with Reis responding to The Big Bopper's lyrics with his own and playing guitar over the chorus. Reis' vocals were recorded over the phone. It was unreleased before its inclusion on All Systems Go.
