= Drive Like Jehu (album) =

Studio album by Drive Like Jehu
- Released: 1991
- Recorded: 1991
- Studio: Westbeach
- Genres: Punk rock; noise rock; math rock
- Length: 44:56
- Labels: Cargo, Headhunter
- Producer: Donnell Cameron

Drive Like Jehu chronology
Drive Like Jehu (1991)	Yank Crime (1994)

Drive Like Jehu is the debut album by the American band Drive Like Jehu, released in 1991 by Cargo Music and Headhunter Records.

Though not as highly regarded as their second and final album Yank Crime, the album did gain the attention of the emerging noise rock and math rock movements, which would later lead many fans to regard Drive Like Jehu as a link between these genres. The album also helped to attract the attention of major record labels, leading both Drive Like Jehu and guitarist John Reis' other band Rocket From the Crypt to sign a lucrative deal with Interscope Records.

== Reception ==
Professional ratings
Review scores
Source	Rating
AllMusic	4.5/5 stars
OndaRock	8.5/10
Select	4/5 medals

Ned Raggett of AllMusic remarked that "the Rick Froberg/John Reis guitar team sound like they've been dipped in battery acid, wired to a power station, and let absolutely loose, screaming, nervous riffs piled on top of each other and taking off for Mars. Froberg's own wild scream singing suits it perfectly, sounding like something's about to give and leave nothing in its wake ... Everything is done in the service of intensity and emotion, winding everything up to explode and then explode again".

== Track listing ==
All tracks by Drive Like Jehu

1. "Caress" – 3:55
2. "Spikes to You" – 2:18
3. "Step on Chameleon" – 5:12
4. "O Pencil Sharp" – 9:42
5. "Atom Jack" – 2:23
6. "If It Kills You" – 7:12
7. "Good Luck in Jail" – 4:05
8. "Turn It Off" – 6:12
9. "Future Home of Stucco Monstrosity" – 3:58

== Personnel ==
- Rick Froberg – lead vocals, rhythm guitar, album art
- John Reis – lead guitar, backing vocals, lead vocals on "Step on Chameleon"
- Mike Kennedy – bass
- Mark Trombino – drums

== Album information ==
- Recorded 1991 at Westbeach Recorders by Donnell Cameron and Joe Peccerillo
- All songs published by Drive Like Jehu
- Produced by Drive Like Jehu and Donnell Cameron
- Mastered at K Disc by John Golden
- Cover artwork by Rick Froberg
