= Lipstick (Rocket from the Crypt song) =

- Cover of the first CD version of the single. The second version and the 7" version used the same photo and lettering, with differently colored backgrounds.

Single by Rocket from the Crypt

from the album RFTC
- A-side: "Lipstick"
- B-side: "Hot Heart"
- Released: 1998
- Recorded: 1998
- Genre: Alternative rock
- Label: Elemental
- Songwriter: Rocket from the Crypt
- Producers: Kevin Shirley, Mark Trombino, Donnell Cameron

Rocket from the Crypt singles chronology
"When in Rome (Do the Jerk)" (1998)	"Lipstick" (1998)	"Break it Up" (1998)

"Lipstick" is a song by the American alternative rock band Rocket from the Crypt, released as the second single from their 1998 album RFTC. It was released by Elemental Records in three versions: as a 7" vinyl single and as two different CD singles, each with a different track list. It was the only one of the album's three singles to chart, reaching #64 on the UK Singles Chart.

== Track listing ==
All songs written by Rocket from the Crypt

CD version 1
No.	Title	Length
1.	"Lipstick"	3:23
2.	"Heads Are Gonna Roll"	3:18
3.	"Cheetah"	3:05

CD version 2
No.	Title	Length
1.	"Lipstick"	3:23
2.	"When in Rome (Do the Jerk)"	3:56
3.	"Strangehold"	3:31

7" version

Side A
No.	Title	Length
1.	"Lipstick"	3:23

Side B
No.	Title	Length
1.	"Hot Heart"	3:13

== Personnel ==
- Speedo (John Reis) - guitar, lead vocals
- ND (Andy Stamets) - guitar, backing vocals
- Petey X (Pete Reichert) - bass, backing vocals
- Apollo 9 (Paul O'Beirne) - saxophone, vibraslap, backing vocals
- JC 2000 (Jason Crane) - trumpet, percussion, organ, backing vocals
- Atom (Adam Willard) - drums, timbales
- Kevin Shirley - recording, production, and mixing of "Lipstick", "Cheetah", and "Strangehold"
- Mark Trombino - production and mixing of "Heads Are Gonna Roll"
- Donnell Cameron - production of "Hot Heart"

== Chart positions ==
Chart (1995)	Peak position
UK Singles	64
