= Break It Up (Rocket from the Crypt song) =

- Cover of the 7" and first CD version of the single. The second CD version used an orange color scheme rather than red.

Single by Rocket from the Crypt

from the album RFTC
- A-side: "Break It Up"
- B-side: "Turkish Revenge"
- Released: 1998
- Recorded: 1998
- Genre: Alternative rock
- Label: Elemental (ELM 49 CDS1, CDS2)
- Songwriter: Rocket from the Crypt
- Producers: Kevin Shirley, Rocket from the Crypt

Rocket from the Crypt singles chronology
"Lipstick" (1998)	"Break It Up" (1998)

"Break It Up" is a song by the American alternative rock band Rocket from the Crypt, released as the third and final single from their 1998 album RFTC. It was released by Elemental Records in three versions: as a 7" vinyl single and as two different CD singles, each with a different track list. Although a music video was filmed, the single did not chart. In fact, of the three singles released from the album, only "Lipstick" managed to make the UK Singles Chart.

== Track listing ==
All songs written by Rocket from the Crypt

CD version 1
No.	Title	Length
1.	"Break It Up"	3:26
2.	"Turkish Revenge"	2:59
3.	"Crack Attack"	4:37

CD version 2
No.	Title	Length
1.	"Break It Up"	3:26
2.	"U.S. Army"	3:29
3.	"Raped By Ape"	4:15

7" version

Side A
No.	Title	Length
1.	"Break It Up"	3:26

Side B
No.	Title	Length
1.	"Turkish Revenge"	2:59

== Personnel ==
- Speedo (John Reis) – guitar, lead vocals
- ND (Andy Stamets) – guitar, backing vocals
- Petey X (Pete Reichert) – bass guitar, backing vocals
- Apollo 9 (Paul O'Beirne) – saxophone, vibraslap, backing vocals
- JC 2000 (Jason Crane) – trumpet, percussion, organ, backing vocals
- Atom (Adam Willard) – drums, timbales
- Kevin Shirley – recording, production, and mixing of "Break it Up"
- Adi Winman – engineering of "Turkish Revenge", "Crack Attack", "U.S. Army", and "Raped By Ape"
