= Circa: Now! =

Studio album by Rocket from the Crypt
- Released: November 1992
- Recorded: 1992
- Genre: Punk rock; rock and roll
- Length: original: 38:51; 2004 re-release: 48:01
- Label: original: Cargo/Headhunter; 1993 re-release: Interscope; 2004 re-release: Swami
- Producer: John Reis

Rocket from the Crypt chronology
Paint as a Fragrance (1991)	Circa: Now! (1992)	All Systems Go (1993)

Professional ratings
Review scores
Source	Rating
AllMusic	4.5/5 stars
The Boston Phoenix	2.5/4 stars
Circus	1.5/5 stars
The Encyclopedia of Popular Music	3/5 stars
Mojo	4/5 stars
MusicHound Rock	4/5 stars
Pitchfork Media	6.8/10
Rock Hard	4.0/10
Select	5/5 medals
Uncut	4/5 stars

Circa: Now! is the second album by American punk rock band Rocket from the Crypt, released in 1992 by Cargo Music and Headhunter Records. It was the band's first album to include drummer Atom and saxophone player Apollo 9. Intense touring following the album's release gained the band acclaim in underground music circles, scoring them the first of many "minor hits" with the song "Hippy Dippy Do." The band also filmed music videos for the songs "Ditchdigger" and "Sturdy Wrist."

The underground success of Circa: Now! brought the band to the attention of major record labels, resulting in numerous offers for recording contracts. In 1993 the band signed to Interscope Records, who bought the rights to Circa: Now! from Cargo/Headhunter and re-released it on a larger scale. Rocket from the Crypt would remain with Interscope until 1999, after which singer/guitarist John Reis started his own record label, Swami Records. Swami released a remastered version of the album in 2004 as Circa: Now! +4, including 4 additional songs recorded in 1993 which had originally been intended for inclusion on the Interscope re-release.

== Recording the album ==
The 2004 Swami re-release includes extensive liner notes written by Reis detailing the band's experience recording the album. According to these notes the band was recording in Westbeach Recorders during the outbreak of the Los Angeles riots on April 29, 1992, and as a result the band were ordered by law enforcement officials to remain inside the studio building. Continuing to record, they found that their master tape was defective and they would have to get a new one. The next morning producer Donnell Cameron and saxophone player Apollo 9 left the studio against police orders and returned with a new master tape to continue recording. After spending a total of four days in the studio completing the album the band were informed by police that they could leave the building.

Nine months later the band had signed to Interscope, who were interested in re-releasing the album and requested that the band record additional tracks for it. Recording in San Diego the band decided to use the spare tape at the end of the Circa: Now! reels, forgetting that it was defective. As they began mixing, chunks of tape broke off and most of the drum tracks were lost. Interscope went ahead with the re-release of the album without the bonus tracks, and the damaged tape remained in the vaults of Universal Records for the next 11 years. In 2004 the band revisited these tapes in order to include the bonus songs on the Swami Records re-release of the album. Then-drummer Ruby Mars assisted in repairing the damaged reels and re-creating the lost drum parts on the bonus tracks which had originally been recorded by Atom.

== Track listing ==
All tracks are written by Rocket from the Crypt.

No.	Title	Length
1.	"Short Lip Fuser"	4:38
2.	"Hippy Dippy Do"	2:43
3.	"Ditch Digger"	4:49
4.	"Don't Darlene"	1:40
5.	"Killy Kill"	2:43
6.	"Hairball Alley"	4:11
7.	"Sturdy Wrists"	2:08
8.	"March of Dimes"	2:32
9.	"Little Arm"	2:34
10.	"Dollar"	2:34
11.	"Glazed"	8:22

2004 CD re-issue
No.	Title	Length
12.	"Lamps for Sale"	2:25
13.	"Crazy Talk"	1:22
14.	"Flight of the Hobo"	3:27
15.	"Over the Rail"	1:54

== Personnel ==
- Speedo (John Reis) - guitar, lead vocals
- ND (Andy Stamets) - guitar, backing vocals
- Petey X (Pete Reichert) - bass, backing vocals
- Apollo 9 (Paul O'Beirne) - saxophone, percussion, backing vocals
- Atom (Adam Willard) - drums

=== Additional musicians ===
- Ruby Mars (Mario Rubalcaba) - re-creation of drum tracks on tracks 12–15
- Tom Geck, Jon Bunch, and Gar Wood - additional backing vocals

== Album information ==
- Record label:
  - original release: Cargo Music/Headhunter Records
  - 1993 re-release: Interscope Records
  - 2004 re-release with bonus tracks: Swami Records
- Recorded at Westbeach Recorders in Los Angeles
- Produced by John Reis with assistance by Joe Peccerelli
- Engineered by Donnell Cameron
- Photography by Jonny Donhowe
- Layout by Mark Gariss
- 2004 re-release remastered by Dave Gardner at Magneto Mastering
