= Inch (band) =

American post hardcore band

- Origin: San Diego, California, U.S.
- Genre: Post-hardcore
- Years active: 1992–1999
- Labels: Seed, Atlantic, Cargo, Headhunter, Goldenrod
- Past members: Kristian Dunn; Dave Hepler; Mike Paprocki; Jeff Reese; Christopher "Pippin" Spanninga; Michael "Stimy" Steinman
- Website: myspace.com/inchsandiego

Inch was an American post-hardcore band formed in San Diego, California, in 1992. The group was founded by former Sub Society vocalist Michael "Stimy" Steinman, guitarist Mike Paprocki, drummer Dave Hepler, and bassist Jeff Reese. Inch released three albums during the 1990s until their disbandment in 1999. After being involved with numerous other bands, frontman Steinman died in 2010.

== History ==
Inch was formed in 1992 by Michael "Stimy" Steinman, Jeff Reese, Dave Hepler, and Michael Paprocki. Steinman sang lead vocals and played rhythm guitar, Hepler was on drums, Reese was on bass, and Paprocki sang backup vocals and played lead guitar. Steinman was the former lead singer of Sub Society, a band that achieved notoriety by being featured in several H-Street skateboarding videos and with the single "A Whole Lot Less." Hepler formerly was the lead vocalist for Helicopter, a nominally significant contributor to the early '90s San Diego sound. The band initially went through a variety of names until they decided on "Grinch". Although Reese and Paprocki had screen-printed numerous promotional stickers, they soon found out that another band was already named Grinch; thus, they cut the first two letters of the word, and settled on "Inch" as the band's name.

The band self-released an untitled demo cassette in 1992, which featured five songs. Around the same time, Reese was replaced on bass by Christopher "Pippin" Spanninga. The band officially released their first single, "Oxidizer", in early 1993 on the independent label Redemption Records. In July 1993, Inch toured the west coast of the US opening for Frank Black. Afterwards, the band was signed to the major label Atlantic Records, and was then moved onto the Seed Records imprint. The band's debut album, Stresser, was released in the spring of 1994 on Seed Records. A music video was filmed for the lead single "Linger". Paprocki was fired from the band not long after. The stripped-down three-piece, with Steinman taking over lead guitar, spent the summer touring the US as part of a "Pre-Palooza" night-before Lollapalooza package that included Failure, Sponge, and fellow San Diego band Rust.

Seed Records went out of business in 1995, around the same time that Inch had almost finished their second album; thus, the album was instead released on Atlantic Records. The album, titled DOT Class "C", was released by Atlantic Records in 1996. The song "For Duty and Humanity" from the album was featured on the soundtrack of the 1996 comedy film Flirting With Disaster and was included in the Foundation Skateboards video Duty Now for the Future. The album's release was short-lived as the band was dropped by Atlantic Records shortly afterwards, and the album was deleted from the label's catalog. After performing on the album and participating during a short tour, bass player Spanninga abruptly quit the band after a show at Moe's in Seattle. The band completed the remaining tour dates with Steinman performing solo acoustically. On their return home the band hired bass player Kristian Dunn. DOT Class "C" was re-released by Cargo Music/Headhunter Records on CD and on Goldenrod Records/Trademark Records on LP in 1997, limited to a run of 750, with hand-silkscreened art by Drive Like Jehu singer and artist Rick Froberg.

In 1997, Inch took home the Best Alternative Rock award at the San Diego Music Awards and spent the summer playing the second stage of the traveling Lollapalooza tour. The band's third and final album, This Will Fall on Dead Ears, was released by Headhunter in 1998. The title of the album was both a play on the band's dissatisfaction with their label not promoting them, and also Steinman's past experiences with drug use and the occult. Inch then went on hiatus in 1999 and the remaining band members would go their separate ways.

Hepler retired from the music industry and instead worked towards becoming a lawyer. Spanninga became an in-studio engineer for various artists. Reese later retired from the music industry and became both a mechanic and a freelance journalist. Dunn formed the band El Ten Eleven in 2002 and released numerous albums afterwards. Steinman formed Lakeside Orchestra with Dunn and Pat Hogan (formerly of Rust and Chacon). He later formed Congress of the Cow, which would later receive the Best New Artist award at the 2002 San Diego Music Awards, Steinman's second time overall winning an award at the ceremony. He also later joined the Colorado-based band Harvey Knuckles.

Steinman was found dead in his Reno, Nevada home on December 30, 2010. He was 38 years old and had died of heart disease. Inch reunited for a memorial show on February 16, 2011, at The Casbah in San Diego, with Hepler on drums, Paprocki returning on guitar, Spanninga and Dunn trading bass duties, Steinman's school friend Matt Page on vocals, and also original bassist Reese in attendance. A reunion of Sub Society opened. Steinman's guitar is mounted on the wall of San Diego bar Livewire, where he used to bartend.

== Members ==
- Michael "Stimy" Steinman – vocals, guitar (1992–1999)
- Dave Hepler – drums (1992–1999)
- Michael Paprocki – guitar (1992–1994)
- Jeff Reese – bass (1992)
- Christopher "Pippin" Spanninga – bass (1992–1996)
- Kristian Dunn – bass (1996–1999)

Timeline

== Discography ==
=== Albums ===
Album	Year	Label
Stresser	1994	Seed Records
DOT Class "C" (Note: Initially released in 1996 but reissued in 1997.)	1996	Atlantic Records
This Will Fall on Dead Ears	1998	Headhunter Records

=== Singles ===
Title	Year	Album
"Oxidizer"	1993	Stresser
"Kermit the Hostage (Live)" (Note: Released as a split-single with Contra Guerra.)	1993	Stresser
"Linger"	1994	Stresser
"Total Access"	1995	DOT Class "C"
"Eugenics"	1996	DOT Class "C"
"Chicharrones"	1997	DOT Class "C"
"For Duty and Humanity"	1997	DOT Class "C"
"Happiness"	1998	This Will Fall on Dead Ears

=== Soundtracks and compilations ===
- 1994: Jabberjaw Compilation (song: "Buzzers and Bells")
- 1994: 91X - San Diego Local Music Soundtrack Sampler (song: "Linger")
- 1995: Kamikaze - Music to Push You Over the Edge Compilation (song: "I'm the Cat")
- 1995: Homage (Lots of Bands Doing Descendents' Songs) Compilation (song: "Kids")
- 1996: Flirting With Disaster Soundtrack (song: "For Duty and Humanity")
- 1997: The Thing Magazine: Hell City Race 666 Sampler (song: "Shaking")
- 1998: Fer Shure: A Tribute to the Valley Girl Soundtrack (song: "The Fanatic")
