= R.I.P. (Rocket from the Crypt album) =

2008 live album

Live album by Rocket from the Crypt
- Released: February 26, 2008
- Recorded: October 31, 2005
- Genre: Punk rock
- Label: Vagrant

Rocket from the Crypt chronology
Live from Camp X-Ray (2002)	R.I.P. (2008)	All Systems Go 3 (2008)

Professional ratings
Review scores
Source	Rating
AllMusic	4/5 stars
Drowned in Sound	8/10
Mondosonoro	7/10
Ox-Fanzine	8/10
Pitchfork Media	7.6/10
PopMatters	7/10 stars

R.I.P. is a live album by the American punk rock band Rocket from the Crypt, released on February 26, 2008, by Vagrant Records. It is a recording of the band's final performance on October 31, 2005, at the Westin Hotel Ballroom in San Diego. It also includes a DVD of the entire performance, including several songs not included on the CD.

== Track listing ==
All tracks are written by John Reis.

No.	Title	Length
1.	"Intro"	1:42
2.	"French Guy"	2:38
3.	"Don't Darlene"	1:37
4.	"I'm Not Invisible"	2:34
5.	"Get Down"	2:23
6.	"Boychucker"	2:46
7.	"Pigeon Eater"	3:26
8.	"Used"	2:30
9.	"Hairball Alley"	3:50
10.	"Shy Boy"	2:22
11.	"Velvet Touch"	3:23
12.	"Light Me"	1:36
13.	"A+ In Arson Class"	1:38
14.	"Middle"	0:59
15.	"Born in '69"	2:21
16.	"Straight American Slave"	1:52
17.	"Carne Voodoo"	1:51
18.	"Sturdy Wrists"	1:52
19.	"Ditch Digger"	4:51
20.	"Come See Come Saw"	5:30

== Personnel ==
- Speedo (John Reis) – guitar, lead vocals
- ND (Andy Stamets) – guitar, backing vocals
- Petey X (Pete Reichert) – bass, backing vocals
- Apollo 9 (Paul O'Beirne) - saxophone, percussion, backing vocals
- JC 2000 (Jason Crane) - trumpet, percussion, backing vocals
- Ruby Mars (Mario Rubalcaba) – drums
