= DeLorean =

DeLorean or Delorean (/dəˈlɔːriən/ də-LOR-ee-ən) may refer to:

== Transportation ==
- DeLorean Motor Company, former American automobile manufacturer
  - DMC DeLorean, 1980s automobile
- DeLorean Motor Company (Texas), current service and parts supplier for DeLorean automobiles
  - DeLorean Alpha5, a concept electric sports car

== Music ==
- Delorean (band), a Basque synthpop group
- DeLorean, a 2007 album by Stonefree
- "Delorean", a song written and performed by Rocket from the Crypt in 1999 on a split 7-inch record with the Hellacopters
- "Delorean", a song from Supermarket by Logic

== Other uses ==
- John DeLorean (1925–2005), American businessman
- DeLorean time machine, the fictional time machine in Back to the Future
