= Paint as a Fragrance =

Studio album by Rocket from the Crypt
- Released: 1991
- Recorded: 1990
- Genres: Punk rock; pop-punk
- Length: 27:59
- Label: Cargo/Headhunter
- Producer: John Reis

Rocket from the Crypt chronology
Paint as a Fragrance (1991)	Circa: Now! (1992)

Paint as a Fragrance is the first studio album by the American band Rocket from the Crypt. It was released in 1991 by Cargo Records and Headhunter Records. It is the band's only recording featuring their original lineup, which included drummer Sean Flynn and backing vocalist Elaina Torres.

== Production ==
The album was recorded for $1,000.

== Critical reception ==
Professional ratings
Review scores
Source	Rating
AllMusic	3/5 stars
The Encyclopedia of Popular Music	2/5 stars
MusicHound Rock: The Essential Album Guide	3.5/5 stars

Westword called the album "an impressive, although scattered, sampler of the band's distinctive punk/pop sound." Trouser Press wrote that "while the album does boast a surfeit of energy, the band often feints when it should jab, backing off intensely memorable riffs while dragging uneventful throbs to the point of tedium." Stylus Magazine called it a "muscular, Pixies-ish, less than stellar 1991 debut that rarely hinted at the brilliance to come."

== Track listing ==
1. "French Guy"
2. "Maybelline"
3. "Shy Boy"
4. "Basturds"
5. "Velvet Touch"
6. "Evil Party"
7. "Stinker"
8. "Jiggy Jig"
9. "Weak Superhero"
10. "Thumbmaster"

== Personnel ==
- Speedo (John Reis) – guitar, lead vocals
- Andy Stamets – guitar, backing vocals
- Pete Reichert – bass, backing vocals
- Sean – drums
- Elaina – backing vocals

Additional musicians

- Rick Froberg, Ian Roarty, Mike Kennedy, and Chuck – additional backing vocals

== Album information ==
- Record label:Cargo Records/Headhunter Records
- Recorded at Westbeach Recorders in Los Angeles
- Produced by John Reis
- Preproduction by Gar Wood
- Engineered by Donnell Cameron
- Mastered at K-Disc
- Photography by Jonny Donhowe
- Disc art by Mark Gariss
- CD layout by O, Jonny Donhowe, and Dean Kegler
- Cover model: Tim Johnson
- Insert drawing by Dean Reis
