= Selby Tigers =

American punk band

Background information
- Origin: Saint Paul, Minnesota, U.S.
- Genre: Punk rock
- Years active: 1998–2003
- Label: Hopeless
- Members: Arzu "D2" Gokcen; Nate Grumdahl; Dave Gatchell; Dave "Sammy" Gardner
- Past members: Nicole Gerber

Selby Tigers was an American punk band formed in 1998. The band's name was chosen as a combination of Selby Avenue, a main thoroughfare in Saint Paul, Minnesota, and a radio broadcast about the Tamil Tigers, a militant organization based in northern and eastern Sri Lanka. The band was signed to Hopeless Records.

== History ==
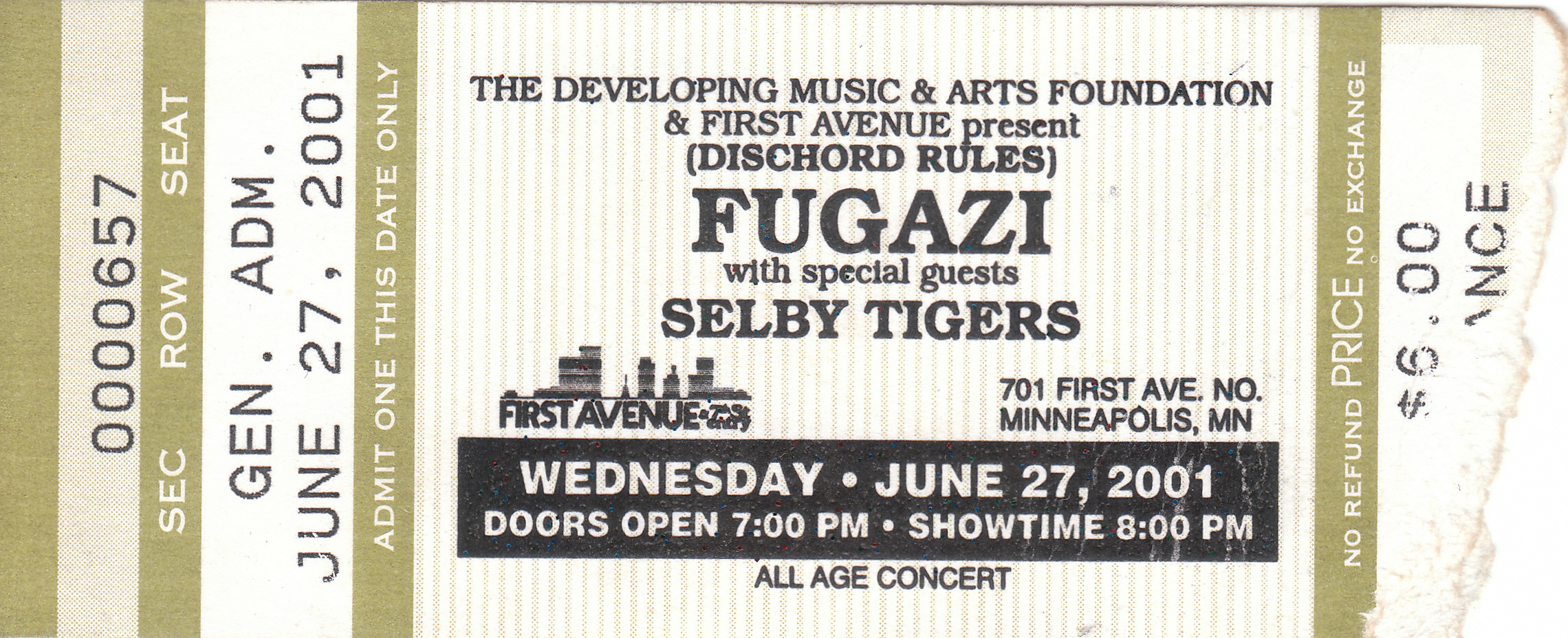
Ticket stub from show opening for Fugazi at First Ave

After a number of years playing in other bands, guitarist Arzu "D2" Gokcen, her husband and second guitarist Nathan Grumdahl, bass player Nicole Gerber, and drummer Dave Gatchell formed the Selby Tigers. The band adopted the name Selby Tigers in reference to their home area of Selby Avenue, a high-school team mascot, and the Tamil Tigers. Their music combines bratty teenage vocals, aggressive guitars, and a thick-necked rhythm section.

After the band released their eponymous debut EP in 1998, Gerber left the band and was replaced by Dave Gardner, a local recording engineer and former member of Impetus Inter. Gardner created an alter ego of a clueless, stereotypical Frenchman, Sammy G. After some long tours, the band released their EP South Then West. The band's EPs and tours attracted attention from Southern Californian punk label Hopeless Records, who signed the band in early 2000. In the spring of that year, Hopeless Records released a 7" teaser single for their LP Charm City, which was released later that summer. The band toured with the Alkaline Trio, the Anniversary, and Rocket from the Crypt.

Selby Tigers broke up in 2003 and Gokcen went on to form a pop-punk band called So Fox. Grumdahl joined The Monarques for a tour and an EP. After the end of So Fox, Gokcen went on to form Spider Fighter, Half Fiction, Strut and Shock and Pink Mink. Dave Gatchell is currently in the Tokyo band 1000s of Cats.

== Discography ==
=== Albums ===
- Charm City (2000)
- The Curse of the Selby Tigers (2002)

=== Singles/EPs ===
- "Year of the Tigers" (1998)
- "South Then West" (1999)
- "Selby Tigers" (2000)

=== Compilations ===
- Hopelessly Devoted to You Vol. 3 (2000)
- Plea for Peace/Take Action 2001 (2001)
- Hopelessly Devoted to You Vol. 4 (2002)
