= Drive Like Jehu =

American post-hardcore band

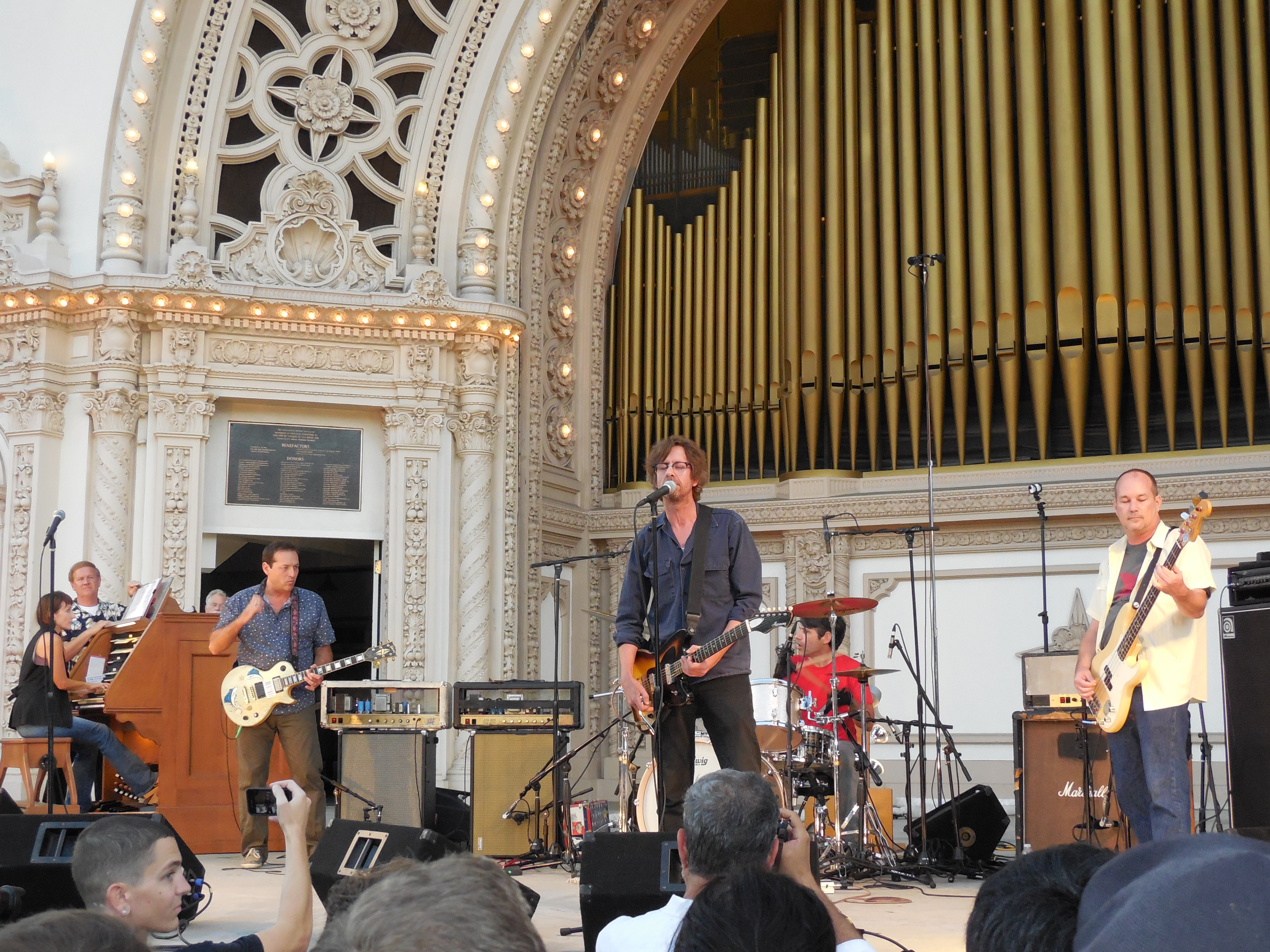
- Drive Like Jehu performing August 31, 2014 at Spreckels Organ Pavilion, accompanied by organist Carol Williams

Background information
- Origin: San Diego, California, U.S.
- Genres: Post-hardcore; emo; math rock; noise rock
- Years active: 1990–1995; 2014–2016
- Labels: Cargo; Headhunter; Merge; Interscope; Swami
- Past members: Chris Bratton; Rick Froberg; Mike Kennedy; John Reis; Mark Trombino
- Website: drive-like-jehu.com

Drive Like Jehu (/ˈdʒiːhuː/) was an American post-hardcore band from San Diego active from 1990 to 1995 and later from 2014 to 2016. It was formed by rhythm guitarist and vocalist Rick Froberg and lead guitarist John Reis, ex-members of the band Pitchfork, along with bassist Mike Kennedy and drummer Mark Trombino, both from Night Soil Man, after their two bands disbanded in 1990. Drive Like Jehu's music was characterized by passionate singing, unusual song structure, indirect melodic themes, intricate guitar playing, and calculated use of tension, resulting in a distinctive sound among other post-hardcore acts and helped catalyze the evolution of hardcore punk into emo. The origin of the name “Drive Like Jehu” is likely from the Old Testament, specifically 2 Kings 9:20.

After releasing its eponymous debut in 1991 through local record labels Cargo Music and Headhunter Records, Drive Like Jehu signed to major label Interscope Records along with Reis's other band Rocket from the Crypt. Its second album, 1994's Yank Crime, gained a cult following, but the group disbanded shortly afterward. Reis continued with Rocket from the Crypt and Trombino became a successful record producer and audio engineer, while Froberg and Kennedy pursued careers outside of music. In 1999, Reis and Froberg began playing together again in Hot Snakes, which was active from 1999 to 2005 and again from 2011 until Froberg's death in 2023. Reis also re-released Yank Crime through his Swami Records label.

== History ==
=== Formation and debut album ===
Rick Froberg (left) and John Reis (right) performing with Drive Like Jehu

Prior to forming Drive Like Jehu, vocalist Rick Froberg and guitarist John Reis had played together in Pitchfork from 1986 to 1990, while bassist Mike Kennedy and drummer Mark Trombino played in Night Soil Man from 1987 to 1990. Both bands performed several times together and respected each other. Pitchfork disbanded due to creative differences and its original bassist, Don Ankrom, relocating to San Francisco; shortly afterward Night Soil Man broke up as well for undisclosed personal reasons. John Reis began hanging out with Kennedy and discovered their mutual admiration for Richmond, Virginia punk band Honor Role. Honor Role guitarist Pen Rollings influenced Reis deeply because his style was "very soulful" and had "personality" despite being a punk guitarist. Thus, he started playing guitar alone for many hours, trying to "merge himself" with the instrument. In 1990, Reis simultaneously formed the "self-proclaimed party band" Rocket from the Crypt and, around one month later, he recruited Froberg (who was also an Honor Role fan), Kennedy and drummer Chris Bratton to form Drive Like Jehu in August 1990. They had around five songs finished, but the relationship with Bratton "didn't work out," and he was replaced by former Night Soil Man drummer Mark Trombino. The band's name was derived from the biblical story of Jehu in the Books of Kings:

And the watchman told, saying, He came even unto them, and cometh not again: and the driving [is] like the driving of Jehu the son of Nimshi; for he driveth furiously.

— 2 Kings 9:20

While Froberg had sung in Pitchfork, in Drive Like Jehu, he also played guitar, adding a rhythm guitar to Reis's lead. Most of the songs started with Reis's guitar ideas, and the whole band developed them through jam sessions. Drive Like Jehu's eponymous debut album was released in 1991 through Cargo Music and Headhunter Records, simultaneous with Rocket from the Crypt's debut Paint as a Fragrance. Produced by Donnell Cameron and with artwork by Froberg, it was praised as "a quantum leap forward" from Reis and Froberg's work in Pitchfork. In 1992, Drive Like Jehu released the single "Hand Over Fist"/"Bullet Train to Vegas" through Merge Records and the song "Sinews" on the Cargo/Headhunter compilation album Head Start to Purgatory.

=== Yank Crime and breakup ===
Interscope Records, interested in Drive Like Jehu, pursued the band and wound up signing both it and Rocket From the Crypt. Drive Like Jehu released an album first, putting out Yank Crime in 1994. Engineered and mixed by Trombino, and again with artwork by Froberg, it had some longer, more complex songs and was described by critics as an "uncompromising maelstrom of technically intricate fury" and "as worthy and awesome as its predecessor."

In 1995, Drive Like Jehu disbanded, partly so that Reis could concentrate on Rocket from the Crypt, which put out three releases that year and continued until 2005. Drive Like Jehu never officially announced a breakup but simply stopped playing together. Trombino became a successful record producer and audio engineer, working with bands such as Blink-182 and Jimmy Eat World, while Kennedy left music to become a chemist. Froberg briefly played in Thingy before moving to New York City to pursue a career as a visual artist and illustrator, later reuniting with Reis in the Hot Snakes from 1999 to 2005. In November 2002, Reis re-released Yank Crime through his Swami Records label, including on it the tracks from "Hand Over Fist" / "Bullet Train to Vegas" and "Sinews" from Head Start to Purgatory. Reis currently performs in The Night Marchers, Froberg performed in Obits until his death in 2023, and together they performed as Hot Snakes.

=== Reunions ===
On August 31, 2014, Drive Like Jehu reunited for a performance at the Spreckels Organ Pavilion in San Diego's Balboa Park, accompanied by San Diego Civic Organist Carol Williams. The collaboration was facilitated by Dang Nguyen, who co-owns Bar Pink in San Diego's North Park neighborhood with Reis and sits on the Spreckels Organ Society board of directors. "In February or March [2014], we discussed possibilities and the topic of Jehu came up; that's where it started," said Nguyen. "It was a project they wanted to bring back together. Because, after Hot Snakes and Rocket [from the Crypt] reunited in the last couple of years, I think John and Rick felt that to do something at the organ pavilion was worth getting back together for." Reis expressed enthusiasm for the organ's sound, saying "I especially love the way the low-end sound on the organ is so massive. When I go see organ concerts in the park, I want to collaborate with that sound and with Carol. It's not necessarily a 'good idea,' but it's an idea I feel strongly about, and it's such a San Diego thing." According to Williams, "the point of the concert is to open up the (musical) boundaries, not to be narrow. The organ needs a future and any opportunities like this, I really look forward to."

The novelty of playing with the accompaniment of the organ was a key factor in bringing the band back together. "The weird thing is that we are playing, and that it took something this weird for us to decide to play a couple of songs again," said Reis. "Only two of us live in San Diego; [Rick] lives in New York and [Mark]'s in Los Angeles. [Mark and Mike] pretty much haven't played music since Jehu or since shortly thereafter. Mark didn't even have a drum set until earlier this year, and he bought one specifically for us to play with the organ." The band played a set of five songs: "Do You Compute", "Super Unison", "Sinews", "If It Kills You", and "Luau". Rob Crow, who sang backing vocals on "Luau" on Yank Crime, joined them onstage during the song to sing his parts.

Drive Like Jehu scheduled a series of performances for 2015, including April 7 and 14 at The Casbah in San Diego, California, April 8 in Pomona, California; April 11 and 18 in Indio, California at the Coachella Valley Music and Arts Festival; and July 3 in Keflavík, Iceland at the All Tomorrow's Parties festival. On October 18, 2015, Drive Like Jehu performed on the Tunnel Stage at the Treasure Island Music Festival in San Francisco. The band continued to tour in 2016, concluding their reunion tour and effectively ending the reunion in August 2016.

Rick Froberg died of natural causes on June 30, 2023.

== Musical style and influences ==
Drive Like Jehu's music is often classified as punk, post-hardcore, and emo. Its initial biggest influence was punk band Honor Role, particularly its guitarist Pen Rollings. Other influences included Mission of Burma, the Gories, Bastro, Slint, Sonic Youth, the Wipers, and krautrock bands such as Neu! Steve Huey of Allmusic calls the band "arguably the most progressive of the leading post-hardcore bands: their lengthy, multisectioned compositions were filled with odd time signatures, orchestrated builds and releases, elliptical melodies, and other twists and turns that built on the innovations of the Dischord label. The result was one of the most distinctive and ferocious sounds in the loosely defined post-hardcore movement."

== Legacy and impact ==
Next to contemporaries such as Fugazi and Quicksand, Drive Like Jehu was sometimes overlooked and their music was sometimes difficult for critics to place in a broader context. According to Huey, the band was influential to the development of emo even though the style's later sound was quite different from Drive Like Jehu's: "The term 'emo' hadn't yet come into wider use, and while Drive Like Jehu didn't much resemble the sound that word would later come to signify, they exerted a powerful pull on its development. Moreover, they did fit the earlier definition of emo: challenging, intricate guitar rock rooted in hardcore and performed with blistering intensity, especially the frenzied vocals." Allmusic's Ned Raggett also commented on the emo connection in his review of Yank Crime: "Perhaps even more than the debut, Yank Crime solidified Drive Like Jehu's reputation as kings of emo. While use of that term rapidly degenerated to apply to sappy miserableness by the decade's end, here the quartet capture its original sense: wired, frenetic, screaming passion, as first semi-created by the likes of Rites of Spring." Brendan Reid of Pitchfork Media also notes that "It's often easy to forget that DLJ were considered emo in their day; Froberg's howls of 'Ready, ready to let you in!' on 'Super Unison' seem like a sick parody of stylish vulnerability. Then the song mutates into a gorgeous, snare-drum rolling open sea, and everything you've ever liked (and still like) about this genre in its purest form comes flooding back."

At the Drive-In frontman Cedric Bixler-Zavala stated that "there would be no Relationship of Command without Drive Like Jehu." He declared: "I remember doing a lot of English press and people being like, 'We think you guys are exotic, the names of the songs and flannel and look is exotic.' I definitely knew what school we came from, and that people like Hot Snakes and Drive Like Jehu were our strongest influences, but they weren’t exactly huge in Europe." Isaac Brock of the indie rock band Modest Mouse said in 2007: "I love [Drive Like] Jehu. Jehu is one of my favorite all-time bands actually." Deftones covered their song "Caress" on their 2011 cover album. Brian Cook, bassist for the metalcore band Botch, stated that “Drive Like Jehu was a huge influence on Botch; their writing approach definitely mirrored what we did in terms of banging things out till we had a song." British hardcore punk group Gallows were also inspired by them and Laurent Barnard singled out John Reis as one of his five favorite guitarists. The Blood Brothers vocalist Jordan Blilie described Rick Froberg's lyrics in the band as "equal parts perplexing and relatable" and called his voice "one of my all-time favorites". He added that the early guitar playing of his own group can be mostly traced back to Jehu. Other artists who have cited them as an influence or expressed admiration for their work are Thursday, Jim Adkins of Jimmy Eat World, Justin Pearson of The Locust, Ben Weinman of The Dillinger Escape Plan, Matt Pryor of The Get Up Kids, J. Clark of Pretty Girls Make Graves, Violent Soho, Unbroken, Akimbo and Sandrider, KEN Mode, METZ, Matthew Bajda of Funeral Diner, Bryan Giles of Red Fang, Steven Roche of Off Minor and Genghis Tron. Bay Area hardcore band Super Unison named itself after the Drive Like Jehu song.

== Members ==
Final lineup

- Rick Froberg – rhythm guitar, lead vocals (1990–1995, 2014–2016) (died 2023)
- John Reis – lead guitar, backing vocals (1990–1995, 2014–2016)
- Mike Kennedy – bass guitar (1990–1995, 2014–2016)
- Mark Trombino – drums (1990–1995, 2014–2016)

Former members

- Chris Bratton – drums (1990)

== Discography ==
Drive Like Jehu discography
- Studio albums: 2
- Singles: 1
- Other appearances: 1

The discography of Drive Like Jehu consists of two studio albums and one single.

=== Studio albums ===
Year	Album details
1991	Drive Like Jehu: Released: 1991; Label: Cargo/Headhunter; Format: LP, CD
1994	Yank Crime: Released: 1994; Label: Interscope/Headhunter; Format: LP, CD

=== Singles ===
Year	Single details
1992	"Hand Over Fist" / "Bullet Train to Vegas": Released: 1992; Label: Merge; Format: 7"

=== Other appearances ===
The following Drive Like Jehu songs were released on compilation albums. This is not an exhaustive list; songs that were first released on the band's albums are not included.

Year	Release details	Track
1992	Head Start to Purgatory: Released: 1992; Label: Cargo/Headhunter; Format: CD	"Sinews" (later appeared on Yank Crime)
