= Born in '69 =

Single by Rocket from the Crypt

from the album Scream, Dracula, Scream!
- A-side: "Born in '69"
- B-side: "Ciao Patsy"
- Released: 1995
- Genre: Punk rock
- Label: Elemental (ELM 325)
- Songwriter: Rocket from the Crypt
- Producer: John Reis

Rocket from the Crypt singles chronology
"Born in '69" (1995)	"Young Livers" (1996)

"Born in '69" is a song by the American alternative rock band Rocket from the Crypt, released as the first single from their 1995 album Scream, Dracula, Scream! It was released as both a 7" vinyl and CD single by Elemental Records and peaked at #68 on the UK Singles Chart. A music video directed by Steve Hanft received play on MTV and MTV Europe.

== Track listing ==
1. "Born in '69"
2. "Ciao Patsy"

== Personnel ==
- Speedo (John Reis) - guitar, lead vocals
- ND (Andy Stamets) - guitar, backing vocals
- Petey X (Pete Reichert) - bass, backing vocals
- Apollo 9 (Paul O'Beirne) - saxophone, percussion, backing vocals
- JC 2000 (Jason Crane) - trumpet, percussion, backing vocals
- Atom (Adam Willard) - drums
- Mick Collins - backing vocals
- Donnell Cameron - engineering, recording
- Eddie Miller - assistant engineer
- Andy Wallace - mixing of "Born in '69"
- Mark Trombino - mixing of "Ciao Patsy"
- Mike Nelson - layout, video stills

== Chart positions ==
Chart (1995)	Peak position
UK Singles	68
