= Cut Carefully and Play Loud =

EP by Rocket from the Crypt
- Released: November 16, 1999
- Recorded: 1999
- Genre: Punk rock
- Length: 13:47
- Label: Flapping Jet
- Producer: John Reis

Rocket from the Crypt chronology
All Systems Go 2 (1999)	Cut Carefully and Play Loud (1999)	Group Sounds (2001)

Professional ratings
Review scores
Source	Rating
Allmusic	4/5 stars

Cut Carefully and Play Loud is an EP by American punk rock band Rocket from the Crypt, released in 1999 by Flapping Jet Records. It was the band's last recording with drummer Atom, who left the group shortly thereafter due to disagreements over the professional direction of the band.

The EP was recorded by friend of the band Gar Wood in his garage. It has unusual packaging; the die cut cardboard sleeve has a large flower-shaped sticker placed over the center hole, making it necessary to cut the sticker around the center hole in order to remove the record from the sleeve. This causes the cut-out portion of the sticker to then become the center label of the record. The warning "cut carefully and play loud" is printed along the edge of the area to be cut, since cutting the sticker poses the risk of scratching the record. This warning became the de facto title of the EP. Because of the unusual packaging the records all had to be hand-assembled by the band and friends. The EP was released in 12" vinyl format limited to 3,000 copies, with the first 100 copies pressed on translucent blue vinyl. The original EP is out of print, however all the songs were re-released on CD format on the compilation album Hot Charity/Cut Carefully and Play Loud in 2002.

In the insert notes of the CD re-release, singer/guitarist John Reis describes Cut Carefully and Play Loud as "a snapshot of a band in hell." After the band ended their contract with major label Interscope Records they spent much of 1999 uncertain of their future or what their next move would be. They were not as prolific as they had been in past years, but still would rehearse and record roughly 3 times per week. Of the songs recorded during this period the band contributed what they felt were the best to the EP. It was due to this period of uncertainty as well as disagreements with Reis over the band's career decisions that drummer Atom left the group in early 2000.

== Track listing ==
Side 1

1. "If the Bird Could Fly"
2. "Blood Robots"
3. "Waste It"

Side 2

1. "Hot Wired"
2. "Who Let the Snakes In??"

== Performers ==
- Speedo (John Reis) - guitar, lead vocals
- ND (Andy Stamets) - guitar, backing vocals
- Petey X (Pete Reichert) - bass, backing vocals
- Apollo 9 (Paul O'Beirne) - saxophone, percussion, backing vocals
- JC 2000 (Jason Crane) - trumpet, percussion, backing vocals
- Atom (Adam Willard) - drums

== Album information ==
- Record label: Flapping Jet Records
- Produced by John Reis
- Recorded by Gar Wood at Box Studios in San Diego
