= RFTC (album) =

Studio album by Rocket from the Crypt
- Released: 1998
- Recorded: 1995
- Genre: Punk rock
- Length: 41:50
- Label: Interscope (CD), Sympathy for the Record Industry (LP), Elemental (UK)
- Producer: Kevin Shirley

Rocket from the Crypt chronology
Scream, Dracula, Scream! (1995)	RFTC (1998)	All Systems Go 2 (1999)

Professional ratings
Review scores
Source	Rating
AllMusic	4/5 stars
The Encyclopedia of Popular Music	3/5 stars
NME	8/10
Pitchfork Media	7.6/10
Rolling Stone	3.5/5 stars
Select	2/5 medals
Spin	7/10

RFTC is the fifth studio album by American punk rock band Rocket from the Crypt, released in 1998 by Interscope Records. It was the band's second major-label release. A music video was filmed for the single "Break it Up" and the band embarked on tours in support of the album, on which they were joined by Chris Prescott from San Diego bands Tanner and No Knife who performed as touring percussionist and keyboardist.

Although overall reaction to the album was positive and singles "Break it Up" and "Lipstick" received radio airplay, RFTC failed to sell impressive numbers to the degree that Interscope had hoped. The label soon turned their attention to higher-grossing acts, leading the band to end their contract with the label the following year. Disagreements between members concerning the professional direction of the band following their departure from Interscope would lead to drummer Atom leaving the group in early 2000. Though the band would continue to record and perform with a new drummer, they would not be as prolific as in their past.

== Recording the album ==
In the album's liner notes, singer/guitarist John Reis states that the entire recording of RFTC was conducted completely live except for the second vibraslap hit on the first verse of "You Gotta Move." He also states that the band were able to use a number of microwave enhancement techniques to exceed the normal industry recording rate of 20 digi-bits per second on compact discs, achieving a rate of 23 digi-bits per second and resulting in a higher quality recording.

== Track listing ==
1. "Eye on You"
2. "Break it Up"
3. "I Know"
4. "Panic Scam"
5. "Made for You"
6. "Lipstick"
7. "You Gotta Move"
8. "Your Touch"
9. "Let's Get Busy"
10. "Dick on a Dog"
11. "Back in the State"
12. "When in Rome"
13. "Run Kid Run"

== Personnel ==
- Speedo (John Reis) - guitar, lead vocals
- ND (Andy Stamets) - guitar, backing vocals
- Petey X (Pete Reichert) - bass, backing vocals
- Apollo 9 (Paul O'Beirne) - saxophone, vibraslap, backing vocals
- JC 2000 (Jason Crane) - trumpet, percussion, organ, backing vocals
- Atom (Adam Willard) - drums, timbales

=== Additional musicians ===
- Jim Dickinson - piano, hammond organ
- Anton Fig - congas on "You Gotta Move"
- Derek Sherinian - piano on "You Gotta Move," organ on "Made for You"
- King Django - trombone on "Back in the State"
- Holly Golightly - additional vocals on "Eye on You"
- Mike Gent - additional vocals at the end of "Run Kid Run"

== Album information ==
- Record label:
  - CD: Interscope Records
  - LP: Sympathy for the Record Industry
  - UK release: Elemental Records
- Produced, recorded and mixed by Kevin Shirley at Avatar Studios in New York
- Extra audio enhancement techniques supervised by the staff at Caveman Productions
- Mastered by Ted Jensen at Sterling Sound in New York
- Art direction and illustrations by Rick Froberg
- Layout and type by Brent Stickels
- Insert photo by Michael Halsband
- Booklet photos by Miki Vukovich
- Photography by Miki Vukovich
- All songs published by Mr. Buttermaker Painting, BMI
