= Hot Charity =

Studio album by Rocket from the Crypt
- Released: August 8, 1995
- Recorded: 1995
- Genre: Hardcore punk
- Length: 27:30
- Label: Perfect Sound (US), Elemental (UK)
- Producer: Sally Browder

Rocket from the Crypt chronology
The State of Art is on Fire (1995)	Hot Charity (1995)	Scream, Dracula, Scream! (1995)

Professional ratings
Review scores
Source	Rating
Allmusic	4/5 stars
MusicHound Rock	4.5/5 stars
Spin	6/10

Hot Charity is the third album by the San Diego, California punk rock band Rocket from the Crypt, released in 1995 on the fictitious record label Perfect Sound Records (though this name appeared on the record sleeve no such label actually existed; in reality the band released it themselves). The original release was limited in number and soon went out of print, however it was re-released in CD format in 2002 by singer/guitarist John Reis on his Swami Records label as part of the compilation album Hot Charity/Cut Carefully and Play Loud.

The LP was supported by a 6-week "free tour" using money from the band's Interscope Records contract to cover the costs, so that fans would not have to pay admission to any of the band's shows for the duration of the tour. This was an unusual move and demonstrated particular faith in the band on the part of the label, especially considering that Rocket had not yet recorded anything for Interscope (the band had negotiated an unusual clause in their contract which allowed them to record vinyl releases for other labels).

Hot Charity was the second of three releases by Rocket from the Crypt in 1995. The EP The State of Art is on Fire and album Scream, Dracula, Scream! were both also recorded and released that year, and singer/guitarist John Reis would later refer to these three records as a "trilogy".

== Recording the LP ==
According to Reis' liner notes included in the CD re-release, Hot Charity was intended to be an experiment of sorts, using funds from the band's recently signed contract with major label Interscope to record in a large professional studio. The first attempt at recording the LP occurred over a five-week period in Hollywood with a label-suggested producer. The band was unsatisfied with the final tone and mixes of the tracks and attempted to salvage the recordings by sending them to a mixing engineer in New York for remixing. They still found the results unsatisfactory, however, and returned to Hollywood a month after the original sessions to completely re-record the tracks with producer Sally Browder. They found these recordings much more satisfactory and recorded a new song, "My Arrow's Aim." In an attempt to save money the band mixed the tracks at a cheap, poorly maintained studio which went bankrupt days after their session ended. The master tapes were seized by the bank, making it nearly impossible for the band to have access to them. Though they were still not completely satisfied with the final mixes, the LP was released and the band was relieved to have finished the project.

== Track listing ==
Side 1

1. "Pushed"
2. "Guilt Free"
3. "Poison Eye"
4. "My Arrow's Aim"
5. "Feathered Friends"

Side 2

1. "Cloud Over Branson"
2. "Lorna Doom"
3. "Shucks"
4. "Pity Yr Paws"

== Performers ==
- Speedo (John Reis) - guitar, lead vocals
- ND (Andy Stamets) - guitar, backing vocals
- Petey X (Pete Reichert) - bass, backing vocals
- Apollo 9 (Paul O'Beirne) - saxophone, percussion, backing vocals
- JC 2000 (Jason Crane) - trumpet, percussion, backing vocals
- Atom (Adam Willard) - drums

== Album information ==
- Record label: Perfect Sound Records
- Produced by Sally Browder
- Layout by Mark Waters
