= The State of Art Is on Fire =

EP by Rocket from the Crypt
- Released: 10-inch: April 1995; CD: November 1996
- Recorded: 1995
- Genre: Punk rock
- Length: 10": 17:05; CD: 21:17
- Label: Sympathy for the Record Industry
- Producer: Long Gone John

Rocket from the Crypt chronology
All Systems Go (1993)	The State of Art Is on Fire (1995)	Hot Charity (1995)

Professional ratings
Review scores
Source	Rating
Allmusic	4/5 stars
Encyclopedia of Popular Music	3/5 stars
MusicHound Rock	4/5 stars

The State of Art Is on Fire is an EP by American punk rock band Rocket from the Crypt. It was released in 1995 on Sympathy for the Record Industry. The album was the band's first release to include trumpet player JC 2000 (Jason Crane).

The EP was first released in 10-inch vinyl format in April 1995. The vinyl release is unusual because side A plays at 33 1/3 rpm, while side B plays at 45 rpm. The CD version, released in November 1996, contains two bonus tracks originally released on the vinyl single "Rocket from the Crypt Plays the Music Machine". The EP is one of the few Rocket from the Crypt recordings to include a lyrics sheet.

The State of Art Is on Fire was the first of three releases by Rocket from the Crypt in 1995. The LP Hot Charity and album Scream, Dracula, Scream! were both also recorded and released that year, and singer-guitarist John Reis would later refer to these three records as a "trilogy".

== Track listing ==
=== 10" vinyl version ===
Side A (33 rpm)

1. "Light Me"
2. "A+ in Arson Class"
3. "Rid or Ride"
4. "Human Torch"

Side B (45 rpm)

1. "Ratsize"
2. "Human Spine"

=== CD bonus tracks ===
7. "Trouble" (Note: Tracks 7 and 8 on the CD version comprise the 7" single "Rocket from the Crypt Plays the Music Machine".) (originally performed by the Music Machine)
8. "Masculine Intuition" (originally performed by the Music Machine)

== Personnel ==
=== Rocket from the Crypt ===
- Speedo (John Reis) – guitar, lead vocals
- ND (Andy Stamets) – guitar, backing vocals
- Petey X (Pete Reichert) – bass, backing vocals
- Apollo 9 (Paul O'Beirne) – saxophone, percussion, backing vocals
- JC 2000 (Jason Crane) – trumpet, percussion, backing vocals
- Atom (Adam Willard) – drums

=== Technical and design ===
- Long Gone John – production
- Craig I. Dragfest – back cover photo
- Patrick Hamou – Insert artwork by
