= Live from Camp X-Ray =

Studio album by Rocket from the Crypt
- Released: October 22, 2002
- Recorded: Summer 2002
- Genre: Punk rock
- Length: 26:29
- Label: Vagrant
- Producer: John Reis

Rocket from the Crypt chronology
Group Sounds (2001)	Live from Camp X-Ray (2002)	Hot Charity/Cut Carefully and Play Loud (2002)

Professional ratings
Review scores
Source	Rating
Allmusic	2.5/5 stars
Encyclopedia of Popular Music	3/5 stars
Mondosonoro	6/10
Stylus	F

Live from Camp X-Ray is the seventh and final studio album by American punk rock band Rocket from the Crypt, released in 2002 by Vagrant Records. It was the band's final studio album, as they broke up on Halloween 2005. Contrary to the album's title, it is not a "live" album but rather a studio recording.

Although the album received generally positive reviews, many consumers were confused by its title and assumed it to be a live album, which in fact it was not. The title was actually a reference to Camp X-Ray, the temporary detention facility located at the U.S. Naval Base in Guantanamo Bay, Cuba. Some fans and critics expressed their disappointment at the album's length, stating that a playing time of 26 minutes was not sufficient for a full-length album and that they had expected more creative output from the band. By this time, however, the band's members had drifted heavily into other projects (most notably singer/guitarist John Reis, who was simultaneously playing in Hot Snakes and Sultans and running his record label Swami Records) and were not as creatively dedicated to Rocket as they had been in the past. Cryptic liner notes written by Long Gone John seemed to indicate that the album was a "last gasp" of a band in turmoil and that it might be their final album.

Touring in support of Live from Camp X-Ray was sparse due to the band members' commitments to other projects, and they would perform infrequently over the next few years. In August 2005, after breaking up Hot Snakes, Reis announced that Rocket from the Crypt would play their final performance on Halloween of that year. This confirmed suspicions that Live from Camp X-Ray was the band's final studio album, though posthumous releases of material recorded before their breakup have since been released.

"Bring Us Bullets" is notable for being featured in the film Crank.

== Track listing ==
1. "I'm Not Invisible"
2. "Get Down"
3. "I Can't Feel My Head"
4. "Can You Hear It?"
5. "I Wanna Know What I Wanna Know"
6. "Bring Us Bullets"
7. "Bucket of Piss"
8. "Dumb Blind and Horny"
9. "Outsider"
10. "Too Many Balls"

== Personnel ==
- Speedo (John Reis) – guitar, lead vocals
- ND (Andy Stamets) – guitar, backing vocals
- Petey X (Pete Reichert) – bass, backing vocals
- Apollo 9 (Paul O'Beirne) - saxophone, percussion, backing vocals
- JC 2000 (Jason Crane) - trumpet, percussion, backing vocals
- Ruby Mars (Mario Rubalcaba) – drums

=== Additional musicians ===
- Anne Zarkus, Wes Tudor, Jason Greenworld, Patricia McLurmick, Santa Peuraro, Kara Richardson, Brianna Lotes, and Evelyn Cooperman – strings on "Can You Hear It?" and "I Wanna Know What I Wanna Know"

== Album information ==
- Record label: Vagrant Records
- Produced by John Reis
- Recorded at Drag Racist studios in San Diego Summer 2002 by John Reis, Dave Gardner and Ben Moore
- Mixed by Ben Moore at Big Fish Recorders with assistance by Jason Clark
- Mastered by Eddy Schreyer
- Artwork by Yannick Desfanleau and Chloe Lum
- Additional layout and design by Joby J. Ford
- Band photo by Ryan Joseph Shuaghnessy III
- Liner notes by Long Gone John
