= Mario Rubalcaba =

American musician

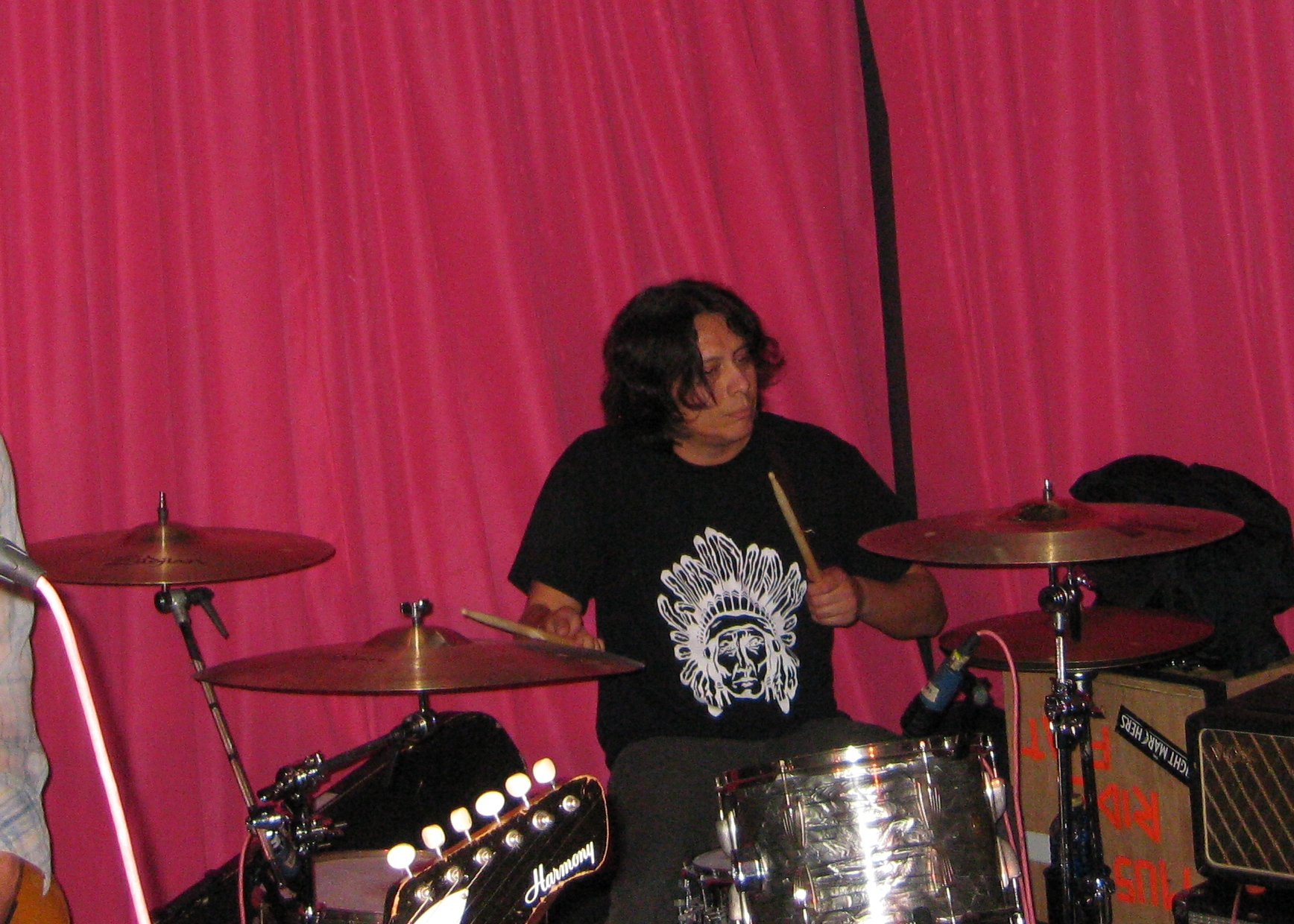
- Rubalcaba performing with Hot Snakes in 2011

Background information
- Also known as: Ruby Mars
- Born: Mario Rubalcaba
- Origin: San Diego, California, U.S.
- Genres: Hardcore Punk; post-hardcore; indie rock; alternative rock; psychedelic rock
- Occupations: Drummer, skateboarder
- Instruments: Drums, guitar
- Labels: Headhunter; Workshed; Nemesis; Slamdek; Conversion; Gravity; Touch and Go; Galaxia; Up; Absolutely Kosher; Vagrant; Flapping Jet; Swami; Tee Pee

Mario Rubalcaba (also known by the stage name Ruby Mars) is an American drummer from San Diego, notable as a member of numerous rock bands including Clikatat Ikatowi, Thingy, Rocket from the Crypt, Hot Snakes, Earthless, the Sultans, and Off! He has also played on albums by The Black Heart Procession and Pinback and was formerly a professional skateboarder.

== Skateboarding career ==
In the late 1980s and early 1990s Rubalcaba was a professional skateboarder, skating for Team Alva. Though he no longer skates professionally, he does work at Black Box, a skateboarding distribution company and skate park in San Diego.

== Musical career ==
Rubalcaba's drumming career began in 1990 with the San Diego post-hardcore band 411. The group released the single Say It in 1990 and the album This Isn't Me in 1991 before disbanding. He next joined the hardcore punk band Chicano-Christ, playing on their eponymous 1991 album. In late 1993 Rubalcaba co-started the post-hardcore San Diego "supergroup" Clikatat Ikatowi (after the demise of Heroin), which included guitarist Scott Bartoloni, performing on Orchestrated & Conducted by Clikatat Ikatowi (1996) and August 29 + 30 1995 (1997) including Clikatat Ikatowi's final release, the EP River of Souls (posthumously released in 1998). In 1994 he became involved with the Louisville, Kentucky-based Metroschifter, a recently launched project of singer/guitarist Scott Ritcher. The four band members each lived in different cities and wrote songs by mailing recorded tracks back and forth to each other. The band's first tour in May 1994 was booked before the members had ever met each other in person, and they practiced together only twice before beginning the tour. Their first album, The Metroschifter Capsule, was recorded two weeks after the band formed. Lacking the funds to mix and release it, they took pre-orders for personalized copies and raised enough money to release it on Ritcher's Slamdek label. Rubalcaba recorded two singles with Metroschifter, For the Love of Basic Cable in December 1994 and Number One for a Second in May 1995, before leaving the group on good terms in December 1996.

In 1997 he next joined the indie rock band Thingy, performing on the album Songs About Angels, Evil, and Running Around on Fire. From 1998 to 2000 Rubalcalba moved to Chicago; there he collaborated with guitarist Bill Skibbe and bassist Jessica Ruffins of The Jaks in an experimental, instrumental group called Sea of Tombs. Their recordings were later released as an eponymous EP in September 2001. In 1999 and 2000 he performed on four releases by The Black Heart Procession: on the tracks "A Light So Dim" and "It's a Crime I Never Told You About the Diamonds in Your Eyes" on the album 2, all tracks on the EPs Fish the Holes on Frozen Lakes and A Three Song Recording, and "A Heart Like Mine" on the album Three. All four releases also included contributions by Jason Crane of Rocket from the Crypt, a band that Rubalcaba would later join. 2000 also saw Rubalcaba's final recording with Thingy, on the album To the Innocent.

In September 2000 Rubalcaba returned to San Diego to join Rocket from the Crypt, replacing drummer Adam Willard. He performed on the albums Group Sounds (2001) and Live from Camp X-Ray (2002) and their accompanying tours. In 2001 he became a founding member of the instrumental psychedelic rock band Earthless with bassist Mike Eginton and guitarist Isaiah Mitchell. In 2002 he also joined a new lineup of the hardcore punk band Battalion of Saints, reuniting with Clikatat Ikatowi guitarist Scott Bartoloni. In 2003 he joined Mannekin Piss, in which he played guitar with future Sultans bassist Dean Reis, performing on the 2004 EP Planet Death. In 2004 he joined one of Rocket from the Crypt singer/guitarist John Reis' other bands, Hot Snakes, replacing drummer Jason Kourkounis. With Hot Snakes he performed on the album Audit in Progress (2004) and the Peel Sessions EP (2005). Earthless' debut Sonic Prayer was released in April 2005.

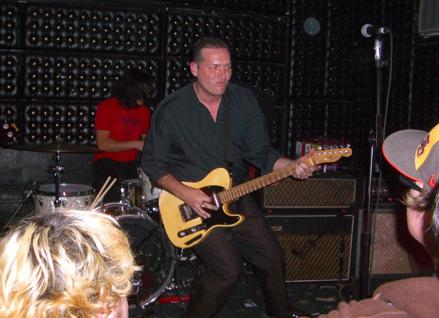
Rubalcaba (back) performing with John Reis in the Sultans at their final performance on January 10, 2007.

After a tour of Australia in Spring 2005 Hot Snakes announced their breakup. A live performance recorded that May for Australian radio station Triple J was released in 2006 as Thunder Down Under. Rocket from the Crypt soon announced their breakup as well; their final performance on Halloween 2005 was recorded and released in 2008 as R.I.P. In January 2006 Rubalcaba replaced Tony Di Prima in another of John Reis' bands, the Sultans, which also included Reis' brother and former Mannekin Piss bassist Dean Reis. The Sultans performed infrequently until their breakup a year later. In 2007 Earthless released their second album Rhythms from a Cosmic Sky. Later that year Rubalcaba performed on the track "From Nothing to Nowhere" on Pinback's album Autumn of the Seraphs and filled in for J Mascis in Witch for several live performances. In October 2008 Earthless released the live album Live at Roadburn, an album that documents the bands unexpected promotion to the “big stage” and a much larger crowd. He is also part owner of the independent record store Thirsty Moon in the Hillcrest Area of San Diego.

In 2009 Rubalcaba joined the hardcore punk supergroup Off! with singer Keith Morris, guitarist Dimitri Coats, and bassist Steven Shane McDonald. The band's first album, First Four EPs, was released in 2010.

== Discography ==
This section lists albums and EPs on which Rubalcaba has performed.

Year	Act	Title	Record label
1991	411	This Isn't Me	Workshed
1991	Chicano-Christ	Chicano-Christ	Nemesis
1994	Metroschifter	The Metroschifter Capsule	Slamdek/Conversion
1995	Metroschifter	Fort Saint Metroschifter	Doghouse
1996	Clikatat Ikatowi	Orchestrated and Conducted by Clikatat Ikatowi	Gravity
1997	Clikatat Ikatowi	August 29 + 30 1995	Gravity
1997	Thingy	Songs About Angels, Evil, and Running Around on Fire	Headhunter
1998	Clikatat Ikatowi	River of Souls	Gravity
1999	The Black Heart Procession	2	Touch and Go
1999	The Black Heart Procession	Fish the Holes on Frozen Lakes	Galaxia
1999	The Black Heart Procession	A Three Song Recording	Up
2000	Thingy	To the Innocent	Absolutely Kosher
2000	The Black Heart Procession	Three	Touch and Go
2001	Rocket from the Crypt	Group Sounds	Vagrant
2001	Sea of Tombs	Sea of Tombs	Gravity
2002	Rocket from the Crypt	Live from Camp X-Ray	Vagrant
2004	Mannekin Piss	Planet Death	Flapping Jet
2004	Hot Snakes	Audit in Progress	Swami
2005	Hot Snakes	Peel Sessions	Swami
2005	Earthless	Sonic Prayer	Gravity
2006	Hot Snakes	Thunder Down Under	Swami
2007	Earthless	Rhythms from a Cosmic Sky	Tee Pee
2007	Pinback	Autumn of the Seraphs	Touch and Go
2008	Rocket from the Crypt	R.I.P.	Vagrant
2008	Earthless	Live at Roadburn	Tee Pee
2010	Off!	First Four EPs	Vice
2012	Off!	Off!	Vice
2014	Off!	Wasted Years	Vice
2018	Earthless	Black Heaven	Nuclear Blast
2018	Earthless	From The West	Silver Current Records
