= Group Sounds (album) =

Studio album by Rocket from the Crypt
- Released: March 6, 2001
- Recorded: 2000/2001
- Genre: Punk rock, rock and roll
- Length: 35:29 (US); 43:19 (EUR)
- Label: Vagrant, B-Unique (Europe)
- Producer: Rocket from the Crypt

Rocket from the Crypt chronology
All Systems Go 2 (1999)	Group Sounds (2001)	Live from Camp X-Ray (2002)

Professional ratings
Aggregate scores
Source	Rating
Metacritic	77/100
Review scores
Source	Rating
AllMusic	4/5 stars
Alternative Press	4/5
The Encyclopedia of Popular Music	3/5 stars
Entertainment Weekly	C+
Mojo	4/5 stars
Mondosonoro	8/10
NME	4/5 stars
Pitchfork Media	8.2/10
Q	3/5 stars

Group Sounds is the sixth studio album by the San Diego, California rock band Rocket from the Crypt, released on March 6, 2001, by Vagrant Records. It was the band's first album for the label and their first with new drummer Ruby Mars.

After the end of their major-label contract with Interscope Records in 1999 and the departure of longtime drummer Atom the following year, the band spent much of 2000 in search of a new label and drummer. Singer/guitarist John Reis experimented with several other drummers, resulting in the formations of Hot Snakes and Sultans, but did not find a suitable replacement for Willard. When Rocket from the Crypt signed to Vagrant Records later that year they recruited Superchunk drummer Jon Wurster to act as their studio drummer, and he played on a majority of the album's tracks. Partway through the recording process, however, the band discovered local San Diego drummer and professional skateboarder Mario Rubalcaba, who joined as their new full-time drummer under the stage name "Ruby Mars" and played on the remainder of the album.

The addition of Rubalcaba gave the band renewed energy, and Group Sounds was released in 2001 to positive reviews. Some touring followed in support of the album, but band members were drifting into other projects (most notably Reis in Hot Snakes and Sultans) and Rocket became less the focus. Their next album, 2002's Live from Camp X-Ray, would prove to be their last.

== Track listing ==
1. "Straight American Slave"
2. "Carne Voodoo"
3. "White Belt"
4. "Out of Control"
5. "Return of the Liar"
6. "Heart of a Rat"
7. "Venom Venom"
8. "Savoir Faire"
9. "S.O.S."
10. "Dead Seeds"
11. "This Bad Check is Gonna Stick"
12. "Spitting"
13. "Ghost Shark"

=== European release bonus tracks ===
14. "Chariots on Fire"
15. "I Won't Stare"
16. "Alone"

== Personnel ==
- Speedo (John Reis) - guitar, lead vocals
- ND (Andy Stamets) - guitar, backing vocals
- Petey X (Pete Reichert) - bass, backing vocals
- Apollo 9 (Paul O'Beirne) - saxophone, percussion, backing vocals
- JC 2000 (Jason Crane) - trumpet, percussion, backing vocals
- Ruby Mars (Mario Rubalcaba) - drums on tracks 1, 3, 5, 8, 10, 14, 15 & 16

=== Additional musicians ===
- Jon Wurster - drums on tracks 2, 4, 6, 7, 9, 11, 12 & 13
- Jim Dickinson - piano on "Ghost Shark"
- Gar Wood - backing vocals on chorus of "Spitting"

== Album information ==
- Record label: Vagrant Records
- Produced by Rocket From the Crypt
- Tracks 1, 3, 5, 8 & 10 recorded and mixed by Donnell Cameron at Westbeach Recorders in Hollywood
- Tracks 2, 4, 7, 9, 13 & 15 recorded and mixed by Stuart Sikes and Easley-McCain Recorders in Memphis
- Tracks 6, 11, 12, 14 & 16 recorded by Chad Blinman at Sunset Sound in Los Angeles and mixed by Mark Trombino at Ecstasy Studios in Los Angeles
- Mastered by Eddy Schreyer
- Design and layout by Dave Lively and Rocket From the Crypt
- Band photos by Shigeo Kikuchi
