= Cargo Music =

American record label

- Parent company: Cargo Records (1989–1995)
- Founded: 1989; 37 years ago
- Founder: Eric Goodis; Randy Boyd; Phillip Hill
- Genre: Punk rock, hardcore punk, pop punk
- Country of origin: United States
- Location: San Diego, California

Cargo Music Inc. is an American punk rock record label based in San Diego, California. It distributes records for other labels, such as Cherry Red Records, Earth Music, FistPuppet Records, Grilled Cheese, Headhunter Records, Re-Constriction Records, RPM Records and Tackle Box. Notable artists that have been signed to Cargo Music include Blink-182, Young Dubliners, Rocket from the Crypt, Drive Like Jehu, and 7 Seconds.

The company was first established in 1989 as a division of the Canadian record company Cargo Records. When its founders sold the Canadian parent company to new owners in 1995, the American division was not part of the sale. It became a separate company which continued to be owned and operated by founder Eric Goodis. His former business partner Phillip Hill took over ownership and operation of the former parent company's office in the United Kingdom to form Cargo Records (UK). The American and British companies were not affected by the Canadian company's bankruptcy in 1997, and both remained in operation as of 2011.

The company maintained a distribution office in Chicago which was closed in 1998.

== Commercial success ==
Cargo Music has received three platinum records (United States, Canada and Australia), of Blink-182's second album Dude Ranch.

== Artists ==
Former artists

- 7 Seconds
- Blink-182
- Chune
- Comeback Kid
- Creedle
- Deadbolt
- Drive Like Jehu
- Fluf
- Heavy Vegetable
- Inch
- Olivelawn
- Pitchblende
- Rocket from the Crypt
- Three Mile Pilot
- Pile Up
