= John Reis =

American musician (born 1969)

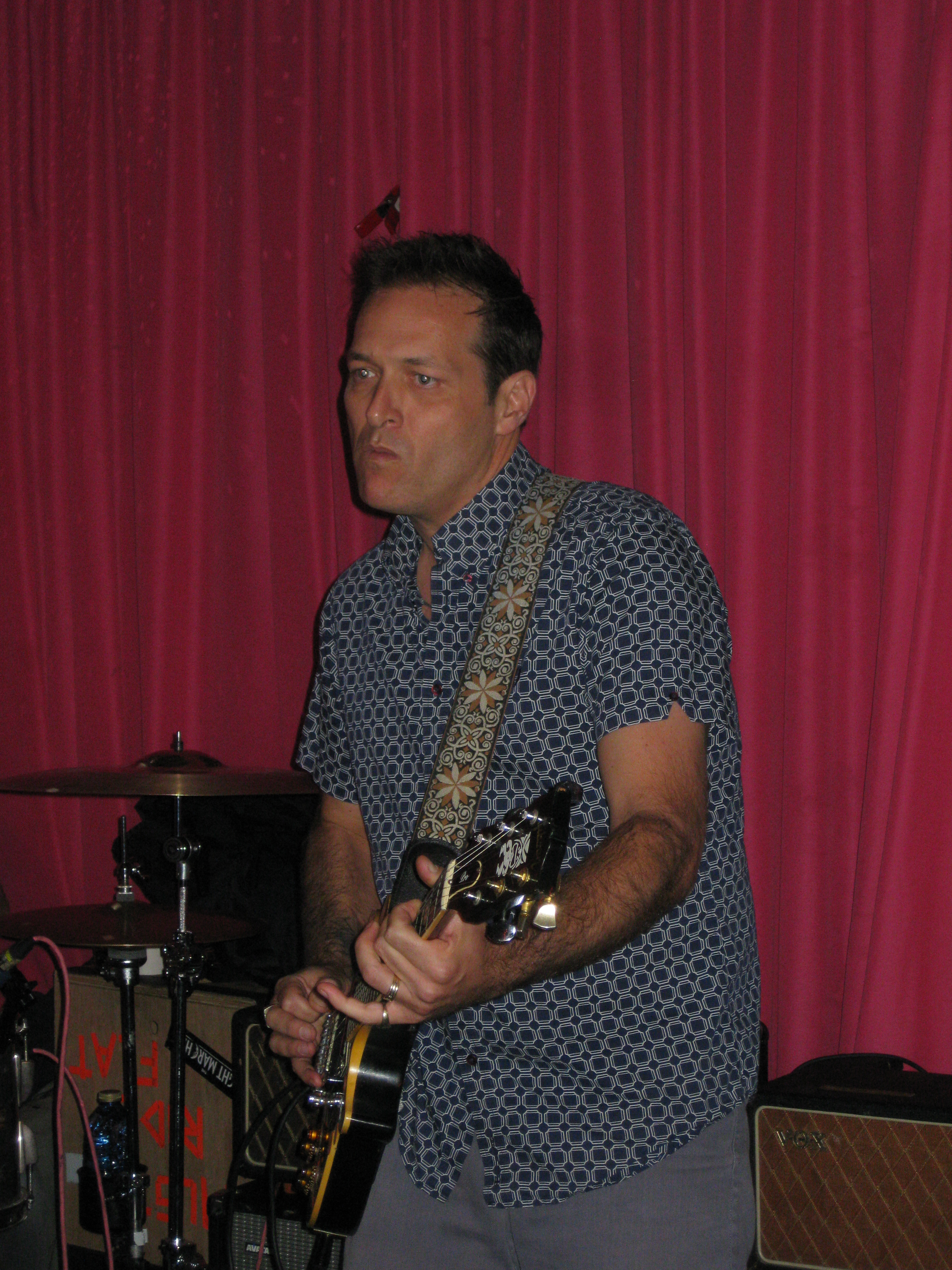
- Reis performing with Hot Snakes in 2011

Background information
- Also known as: Speedo, the Swami, Slasher
- Born: April 23, 1969 (age 57); Ocean Beach, San Diego, California, United States
- Genres: Punk rock, alternative rock, rock and roll, post-hardcore
- Occupations: Musician, singer, guitarist, record label owner, DJ, bar owner
- Instruments: Guitar, bass guitar, vocals
- Years active: 1986–present
- Labels: Cargo, Interscope, Swami, Vagrant

John Reis (born 23 April 1969), also known by the pseudonyms Speedo, Slasher, and the Swami is an American musician, singer, guitarist, record label owner, and disc jockey. He is best known as the singer and guitarist for the rock band Rocket from the Crypt, which he formed and fronted (as Speedo) for the entirety of its career from 1990 to 2005.

Prior to this he was the guitarist in the post-hardcore band Pitchfork, and also played in Drive Like Jehu during the early 1990s. In 1999 he formed the Hot Snakes, and in 2000 also formed the Sultans, in which (as Slasher) he sang and originally played bass before switching to rhythm guitar. He played in both these bands until their breakups in 2005 and 2007 respectively. He also released a solo recording under the name Back Off Cupids, which was recorded in 1994 but not released until 1999. Over the years he has performed in many other musical acts including Conservative Itch, Stacatto Reads, Custom Floor, and Beehive & the Barracudas.

He is the owner of Swami Records, a label he founded in 1999 (he uses the title the Swami in this capacity). He frequently works with bands in a studio capacity and releases albums by many southern California groups through his label. He also hosts the "Swami Sound System" program (previously on San Diego radio station 94.9 (KBZT), and now available on Slacker Radio). Reis remains an influential figure in the San Diego underground music community and is currently performing with San Diego bands the Night Marchers and PLOSIVS, with Rob Crow.

== Musical career ==
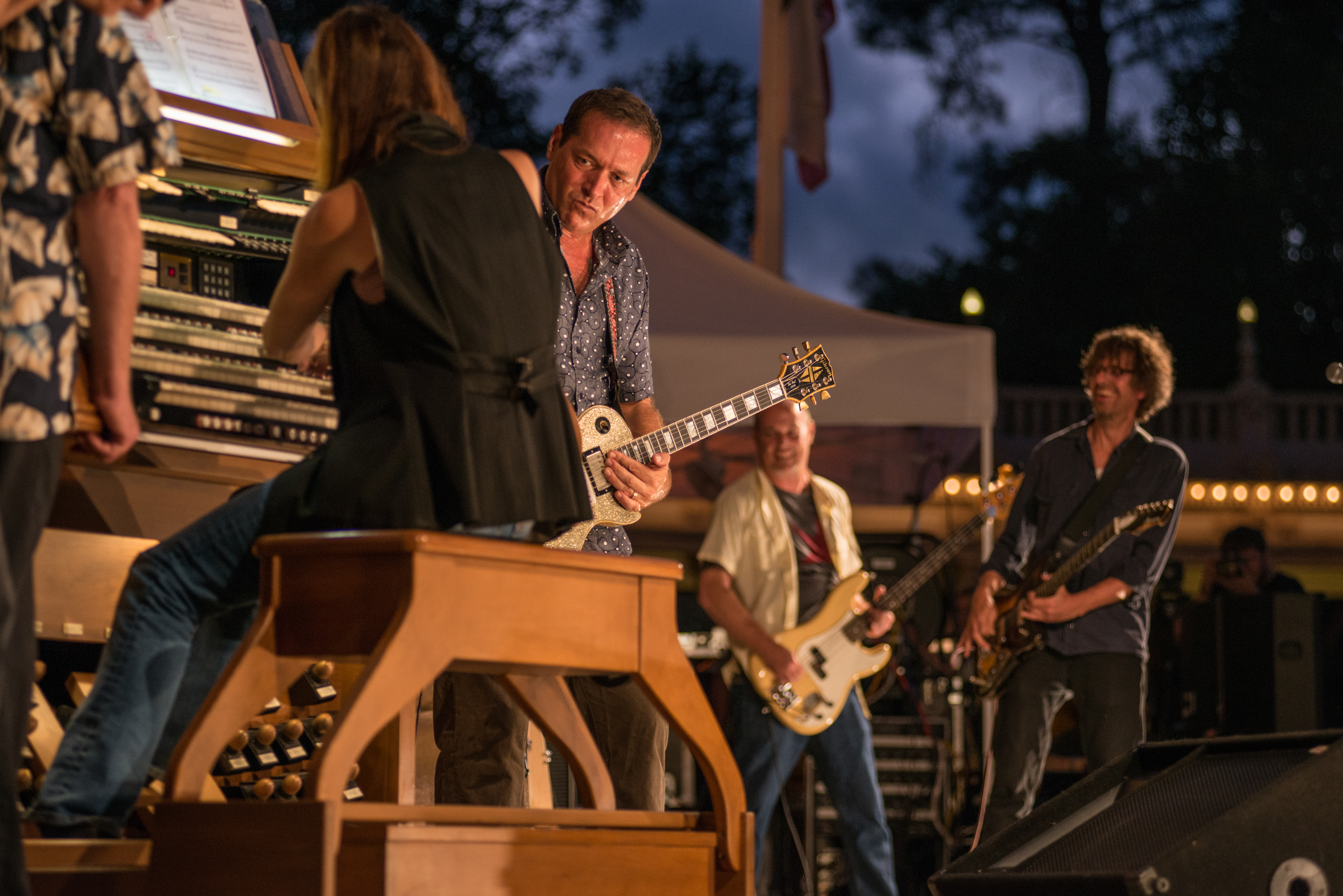
Reis (foreground) performing with Drive Like Jehu and organist Dr. Carol Williams in 2014

Reis became involved in music in 1984, playing in a punk rock band called Conservative Itch at age 15. In 1986 he formed the post-hardcore group Pitchfork with friend Rick Froberg, in which he played until the group's dissolution in 1990. Following this he formed two new bands: Drive Like Jehu included Froberg and was the more experimental, exploring styles such as post-punk, post-hardcore, math rock, and early-1990s emo. Rocket from the Crypt, meanwhile, was envisioned as a more back-to-basics rock band and involved other San Diego-area musicians. Both groups released debut albums in 1991 through local labels Cargo Records and Headhunter Records. Rocket from the Crypt was soon re-invented as a punk-inspired rock & roll band with a horn section, developing a reputation for creative and energetic live shows. The group released many vinyl singles and put out their second album Circa: Now! in 1992. Reis' heavy involvement with Rocket from the Crypt sidelined Drive Like Jehu at this time, but both groups were soon signed to major label Interscope Records as a pair.

In 1994 Rocket from the Crypt took a six-month break while Reis returned to work with Drive Like Jehu, recording the critically acclaimed album Yank Crime. At this time he also recorded an album's worth of solo material under the project name Back Off Cupids, but the majority of this work went unreleased until 1999. In 1995, with little fanfare, Drive Like Jehu disbanded and Reis resumed working with Rocket from the Crypt full time. The group experienced a flurry of creativity that resulted in a trilogy of releases that year, culminating in the acclaimed album Scream, Dracula, Scream! They became well known in the alternative music community, filmed several music videos, toured internationally, and experienced a surge of popularity in the United Kingdom. They released a follow-up entitled RFTC in 1998, but Interscope turned their attention to higher-grossing acts and soon the band left the label. This was followed by the departure of longtime drummer Adam Willard from the group in early 2000, resulting in a hiatus of sorts during which Reis explored other musical endeavors.

In 1999 Reis started the record label Swami Records, primarily as a means of releasing music by a number of San Diego-area bands including several he was involved with. He also formed two new bands: Sessions with drummer Jason Kourkounis resulted in the formation of Hot Snakes (which also reunited Reis with Rick Froberg), while collaborations with drummer Tony Di Prima led to the formation of the Sultans. Both bands essentially explored stripped-down versions of the musical formulas Reis had established in Rocket from the Crypt, with Hot Snakes incorporating some of the more experimental elements of Drive Like Jehu while the Sultans used a more straightforward rock & roll approach. During this time Reis recorded and acted as producer for a number of groups, including Superchunk, Selby Tigers, GoGoGo Airheart, and the Red Onions. He also performed on and off with other bands including Stacatto Reads, Custom Floor, and Beehive and the Barracudas.

Rocket from the Crypt regrouped in 2000, signing to Vagrant Records and bringing in new drummer Mario Rubalcaba. Reis continued to record and perform with Rocket from the Crypt, Hot Snakes, and the Sultans for the next several years, dividing his time between all three groups. Between 1999 and 2005 he recorded 2 albums with Rocket from the Crypt, 2 with the Sultans, and 3 with Hot Snakes. In 2003 his younger brother Dean Reis joined him in the Sultans. Rubalcaba also became a member of all three of Reis' bands, replacing Kourkounis in Hot Snakes in 2004 and Di Prima in the Sultans in 2006.

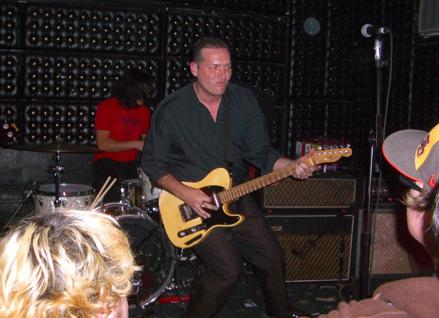
Reis performing with the Sultans in 2007

2005 marked the end of Reis' multi-band involvement, with the breakups of Hot Snakes in July and Rocket from the Crypt on Halloween. He then focused his attention on Swami Records, putting out numerous releases that Fall and Winter and organizing tours in support of the label. He began hosting the "Swami Sound System" program on San Diego radio station 94.9 (KBZT) and continued to play with the Sultans occasionally until their disbanding in January 2007.

== Recent activity ==
Reis continues to operate Swami Records and acts as a producer and occasional studio musician for various artists and releases on the label, while focusing on his new role as a father. He constructed his own recording studio and opened a bar called The Bar Pink Elephant (later renamed Bar Pink) in San Diego's North Park district. In 2007 he announced a new musical project, and began recording and writing new songs with former Hot Snakes members Gar Wood and Jason Kourkounis and CPC Gangbangs bassist Tommy Kitsos. Reis described the new group as "a combonation [sic] of everything I've been a part of dating back to my prepubescent days in Pitchfork. Similar to Hot Snakes but not as sinister yet still maintaining some of the drama and subsonic boom. Akin to the rockin' fun of RFTC but without the same kind of riffery. Like the Sultans but not as straightforward yet still maintaining the sense of melody and pop of the 2nd record." Dubbed the Night Marchers, the new group began performing and touring in 2008 with Reis again using the stage name "Speedo". Their debut album See You in Magic was released on April 22, 2008.

Reis continues to host the "Swami Sound System" program on San Diego radio station 94.9 on Saturday nights and is preparing several releases of rare and previously unreleased Rocket from the Crypt material. He also plays a recurring role on the television show Yo Gabba Gabba! as the Music Swami, introducing each episode's musical guest.

In 2011 Hot Snakes announced they will be reforming for tours the US and Europe.

In 2015, Reis produced American rock band Ceremony's fifth studio album, The L-Shaped Man.

In March 2015, Vintage Piss was released by Sonny Vincent and Rocket from the Crypt. The album was originally recorded with Vincent in 2003 following a tour with Rocket from the Crypt serving as his backing band however the album was left unmixed and unfinished until twelve years later following the reunion of Rocket from the Crypt when Reis decided to go back and complete the album, which he also produced.

On 9/8/21 he made his debut with Me First and the Gimme Gimmes at Express Live! in Columbus, OH performing with CJ Ramone, Andrew "Pinch" Pinching, Jonny "2 Bags" Wickersham and Spike Slawson.

== Personal life ==
Reis is married. He and his wife had their first child, a son, in 2006.

== Influence ==
Many artists have cited John Reis as an influence or have expressed admiration for his work, including Jim Adkins of Jimmy Eat World, Kurt Ballou of Converge, Laurent Barnard of Gallows and Steven Andrew Miller of Unbroken. According to Doug McCombs of Tortoise-fame:

John Reis fills a void. It's a cynical world and there aren't many true believers in rock & roll anymore. He's the carnival barker that lures you into rock & roll. He believes in rock & roll wholeheartedly and wants you to believe too. He's a genius at guitar riffs. He's evidence that rock & roll is not played out.

== Discography ==
This section lists albums and EPs on which Reis has performed. For complete listings of releases by each act, see their individual articles.

Year	Act	Title	Credits
1989	Pitchfork	Saturn Outhouse	guitar
1990	Pitchfork	Eucalyptus	guitar
1991	Drive Like Jehu	Drive Like Jehu	guitar, backing vocals
1991	Rocket from the Crypt	Paint as a Fragrance	guitar, lead vocals
1992	Rocket from the Crypt	Circa: Now!	guitar, lead vocals
1994	Drive Like Jehu	Yank Crime	guitar, backing vocals
1995	Rocket from the Crypt	The State of Art is on Fire	guitar, lead vocals
1995	Rocket from the Crypt	Hot Charity	guitar, lead vocals
1995	Rocket from the Crypt	Scream, Dracula, Scream!	guitar, lead vocals
1998	Rocket from the Crypt	RFTC	guitar, lead vocals
1999	Rocket from the Crypt	Cut Carefully and Play Loud	guitar, lead vocals
2000	Hot Snakes	Automatic Midnight	guitar, backing vocals
2000	Back Off Cupids	Back Off Cupids	vocals, guitar, bass guitar, drums, other instrumentation
2000	Sultans	Sultans	bass guitar, lead vocals
2000	Sultans	Ghost Ship	bass guitar, lead vocals
2001	Rocket from the Crypt	Group Sounds	guitar, lead vocals
2002	Hot Snakes	Suicide Invoice	guitar, backing vocals
2002	Rocket from the Crypt	Live from Camp X-Ray	guitar, lead vocals
2004	Sultans	Shipwrecked	guitar, lead vocals
2004	Hot Snakes	Audit in Progress	guitar, backing vocals
2005	Hot Snakes	Peel Sessions	guitar, backing vocals
2005	Dan Sartain	Dan Sartain vs. the Serpientes	guitar, bass guitar, keyboards, maracas, drum machine, backing vocals
2006	Dan Sartain	Join Dan Sartain	guitar, organ, percussion and arrangements, maracas, backing vocals
2006	Hot Snakes	Thunder Down Under	guitar, backing vocals
2008	Rocket from the Crypt	RIP	guitar, lead vocals
2008	The Night Marchers	See You in Magic	guitar, lead vocals
2013	The Night Marchers	Allez Allez	guitar, lead vocals
2015	Swami John Reis & the Blind Shake	Modern Surf Classics	guitar
2015	Sonny Vincent and Rocket from the Crypt	Vintage Piss	guitar, vocals, producer
2018	Hot Snakes	Jericho Sirens	guitar, backing vocals
2022	Swami John Reis	Ride the Wild Night	guitar, vocals, bass, percussion, synth
2022	Plosivs	Plosivs	guitar, vocals
2024	Swami John Reis	All Of This Awaits You	guitar, vocals
2025	Swami John Reis	Time To Let You Down	guitar, vocals
