= Andy Stamets =

- Also known as: ND, The Flame, Black Flame
- Born: Andy Stamets; April 9, 1973 (age 52)
- Genres: Punk rock, alternative rock
- Occupation: Guitarist
- Instrument: Guitar
- Labels: Cargo, Interscope, Swami, Vagrant

Andy Stamets (also known by the pseudonyms ND, The Flame, and Black Flame) is an American guitarist who was a member of Rocket from the Crypt, Beehive & the Barracudas, and the Sultans.

== Musical career ==
Stamets was a founding member of Rocket from the Crypt (under the pseudonym "ND"), who formed in 1990 and released their debut album Paint as a Fragrance in 1991. Circa: Now! followed in 1992, attracting the attention of major record labels, and the band signed to Interscope Records. In 1995 the band had a trio of releases: The State of Art is on Fire, Hot Charity, and Scream, Dracula, Scream!. They released RFTC in 1998, but Interscope turned their attention to higher-grossing acts and the band soon left the label. This was followed by the departure of longtime drummer Adam Willard from the group in early 2000. Sessions with drummer Tony Di Prima led to the formation of the Sultans, consisting of Stamets (as "Black Flame"), Di Prima, and Rocket from the Crypt singer/guitarist John Reis. They released the EP Sultans and the album Ghost Ship in 2000.

Rocket from the Crypt regrouped in 2000, signing to Vagrant Records and bringing in new drummer Mario Rubalcaba. Stamets continued to record and perform with Rocket from the Crypt, who released Group Sounds in 2001 and Live from Camp X-Ray in 2002. He left the Sultans, however, and was replaced by Reis' younger brother Dean. Rocket from the Crypt disbanded after playing their final performance on Halloween 2005, which was recorded and later released as R.I.P.

== Discography ==
This section lists albums and EPs on which Stamets has performed. For complete listings of releases by each act, see their individual articles.

| Year | Act | Title | Credits |
|---|---|---|---|
| 1991 | Rocket from the Crypt | Paint as a Fragrance | guitar, backing vocals |
| 1992 | Rocket from the Crypt | Circa: Now! | guitar, backing vocals |
| 1995 | Rocket from the Crypt | The State of Art is on Fire | guitar, backing vocals |
| 1995 | Rocket from the Crypt | Hot Charity | guitar, backing vocals |
| 1995 | Rocket from the Crypt | Scream, Dracula, Scream! | guitar, backing vocals |
| 1998 | Rocket from the Crypt | RFTC | guitar, backing vocals |
| 1999 | Rocket from the Crypt | Cut Carefully and Play Loud | guitar, backing vocals |
| 2000 | Sultans | Sultans | guitar, backing vocals |
| 2000 | Sultans | Ghost Ship | guitar, backing vocals |
| 2001 | Rocket from the Crypt | Group Sounds | guitar, backing vocals |
| 2002 | Rocket from the Crypt | Live from Camp X-Ray | guitar, backing vocals |
| 2008 | Rocket from the Crypt | R.I.P. | guitar, backing vocals |
