= Radiofrequency thermocoagulation =

Thermal pain treatment procedure

- Other names: RFTC

Radiofrequency thermocoagulation is a thermal pain treatment procedure. For example, percutaneous intradiscal radiofrequency thermocoagulation (PIRFT) involves the placement of an electrode or catheter into the intervertebral disc and applying an alternating radiofrequency current.
