= Rocket from the Crypt =

American punk rock band

- Left to right: JC 2000, Petey X, Atom (front), Apollo 9, ND, and Speedo in 1998

Background information
- Origin: San Diego, California, U.S.
- Genres: Punk rock; hardcore punk; garage rock; psychobilly; rock and roll; alternative rock
- Years active: 1990–2005, 2011, 2013–present
- Labels: Cargo, Headhunter, Elemental Records (Europe), Sympathy for the Record Industry, Perfect Sound, Interscope, Flapping Jet, Vagrant, Swami
- Spinoffs: Drive Like Jehu, Hot Snakes, Sultans
- Spinoff of: Pitchfork
- Members: Speedo; Petey X ND; Apollo 9 JC 2000; Ruby Mars
- Past members: Elaina; Sean; Atom
- Website: rftc.com

Rocket from the Crypt is an American punk rock band from San Diego, California, formed by singer-guitarist John Reis and originally active from 1990 to 2005, briefly in 2011, and again from 2013 to the present.

The band gained critical praise and the attention of major record labels after the release of their 1992 album Circa: Now!, leading to a recording contract with Interscope Records. They experienced a surge of popularity with the release of the albums Scream, Dracula, Scream! (1995) and RFTC (1998), accompanied by numerous vinyl singles and EPs released on independent labels. However, album sales did not meet expectations and Interscope soon turned their attention to higher-grossing acts. The band left the label, and shortly thereafter drummer Atom Willard departed the group. After a period of inactivity in 1999 and 2000, during which singer/guitarist John Reis formed Hot Snakes and Sultans and launched his Swami Records label, the band signed to Vagrant Records and recruited new drummer Ruby Mars. They experienced a revitalization of creative energy and released two more albums, but were not as prolific as in the past.

Over the next few years the band members became increasingly involved with other projects. Rocket from the Crypt decided to disband in 2005, playing a sold-out farewell show on Halloween in their hometown of San Diego. However, the band reunited in 2011 for a one-off appearance on the television program Yo Gabba Gabba!, and in 2013 reformed once more for a series of performances in the US, Europe and Australia.

Rocket From the Crypt have had a significant impact on alternative music, being cited as an influence by such bands as Jimmy Eat World, the Get Up Kids, and Unbroken.

== Band history ==
=== Formation ===
After the breakup of his post-hardcore band Pitchfork in 1990, Reis formed both Rocket from the Crypt and Drive Like Jehu in July and August of that year respectively. Envisioned as a punk-inspired rock and roll band, Rocket from the Crypt's original lineup consisted of Reis, guitarist Andy Stamets, bassist Pete Reichert, drummer Sean, and backing vocalist Elaina. The band took their name from the then-defunct 1970s underground punk band Rocket from the Tombs. This lineup lasted roughly six months and recorded the band's debut album Paint as a Fragrance, released in 1991 on local label Cargo Music.

At this time, Reis began to use the pseudonym "Speedo" when working with the band. He was also simultaneously performing in Drive Like Jehu, who recorded their debut album around the same time. When Sean and Elaina moved away from San Diego, drummer Adam Willard joined the band under the stage name "Atom." The rest of the Rocket also assumed stage monikers, with Stamets performing as "ND" and Reichert as "Petey X."

The band also began to wear matching stage attire, an idea that, according to Reis was a result of being inspired by older artists as it was a reaction to the alternative and punk rock scene around them:

[The idea to wear matching outfits] was taken from hundreds of garage rock and soul bands from the 50s, 60s and 70s. But among our peers? We started in an era in the 1990s when bands were wearing flannel and torn denim: that's what punk rock had turned into. (...) It was like American punk-rock music and hardcore had turned into more like a 1970s dirtbag aesthetic, you know? We looked at it and thought "that looks dumb". We knew that we didn't want anything to do with it because it didn't really represent who we were. So there was a bit of a contradiction in us being into punk-rock music and also being into rock & roll and wanting to entertain and put on a show. But for us it made perfect sense: you could not only be inspired by Black Flag but you could be inspired by James Brown as well.

The band soon added a horn section, recruiting saxophone player Paul "Apollo 9" O'Beirne. They developed a reputation for their creative and energetic live shows, taking unusual measures to encourage audience participation such as handing out homemade lyric booklets and noisemakers. They released many vinyl singles around this time and began to attract a dedicated underground following. Reis recalls:

"It was really immediate; that's why we loved putting out singles early on. We recorded some songs for Sympathy for the Record Industry, and two weeks later, we had some finished copies of them. The turnaround time was amazing. And by the time people were able to get them, it was still under a month. They're hearing something that is completely fresh–this is something we're doing at the moment. We did that for, like, a three-year period."

Their second album Circa: Now! was released in 1992, followed by their first tour and music videos for the songs "Ditchdigger" and "Sturdy Wrist." The band also added a second member to its horn section, bringing in trumpeter Jason "JC 2000" Crane. Around this time Reis announced in a fanzine that all fans with Rocket from the Crypt tattoos would be allowed into the band's shows for free, for life, causing tattoos of their logo to become an international phenomenon.

=== Signing to Interscope ===
Fueled by a label interest in Drive Like Jehu, both Rocket from the Crypt and Drive Like Jehu signed to Interscope Records in 1992, with Rocket negotiating a deal that included the freedom to record vinyl releases for other labels. Many of the band's vinyl singles and other rarities were compiled and released as All Systems Go, while Interscope re-released Circa: Now! and pushed for the band to continue touring in support of the album. Even with market saturation high, however, the band members decided to take a six-month break in 1994 while Reis recorded a second and final album with Drive Like Jehu.

Regrouping after their hiatus, the band experienced a flurry of creative energy that resulted in several more vinyl singles and a trilogy of records in 1995, beginning with the EP The State of Art is on Fire and continuing with the critically acclaimed Hot Charity. They embarked on a six-week "free tour" in support of Hot Charity, with Interscope covering the costs so that fans were not charged admission to any of the band's performances across the United States. This was followed by the recording of their first album for Interscope, the critically acclaimed Scream, Dracula, Scream! The band took advantage of their large recording budget, bringing in string sections and hiring producers to make the album sound as epic as possible, and it would later be regarded by most as their creative peak. Music videos were filmed for the singles "On a Rope," "Born in '69" and "Young Livers" and the band embarked on tours of the US, UK and Europe. They experienced a surge of popularity in the UK, where "On a Rope" entered the UK Singles Chart at No. 12, and was a hit on MTV Europe, earning them rave reviews in NME and allowing them to play Top of the Pops. 1996 also saw them win The Phillip Hall Radar award at the NME awards event.

They were also an alternative rock hit in the US, where their videos were featured on MTV and the band received many positive reviews in both mainstream and underground music presses. MTV VJ Kennedy sported a tattoo of the band's logo on her ankle on national television, and increased radio and MTV airplay continued. A large headlining tour ensued in 1996, as well as supporting tours with Rancid and Soundgarden. The band also gained a reputation for a series of interesting and, at times, seemingly ludicrous gimmicks and stage antics which included holding raffles during live performances, spinning a large game show wheel to determine set lists, onstage fire breathing, annual Halloween and New Year's shows, and the wearing of coordinated and progressively more ornate stage costumes. In Europe the band also hosted a German variety show, played children's shows and morning shows, and did interviews with fashion magazines.

=== Lineup change ===
In 1998, Rocket from the Crypt released RFTC. For the accompanying tour they were joined by Chris Prescott from San Diego bands Tanner and No Knife, who performed as touring percussionist and keyboardist. Though overall reaction was positive and singles "Break it Up" and "Lipstick" received radio airplay, the album failed to sell well. The band settled some contractual obligations and then left their label. In 1999 San Diego music magazine SLAMM named them the "best San Diego band of all time" in their coverage of local acts leading up to New Year's Eve 2000. The band tried to maintain their creativity with the release of the EP Cut Carefully and Play Loud that year, but disagreements between members over the band's direction resulted in drummer Atom Willard departing the group in early 2000 (he would go on to act as Weezer's drum technician and play in The Special Goodness, later becoming permanent drummer in both The Offspring and Angels & Airwaves). Rocket took a brief hiatus, during which Reis launched his own record label Swami Records and released a second rarities collection called All Systems Go 2, as well as debut albums by his newly formed bands Hot Snakes and Sultans.

=== Signing to Vagrant ===
In 2000, the band signed to independent label Vagrant Records and began work on the album Group Sounds, with Superchunk drummer Jon Wurster filling in on drums. Partway through the recording process they recruited San Diego drummer and professional skateboarder Mario Rubalcaba as their full-time drummer, giving him the stage name "Ruby Mars." The addition of Rubalcaba gave the band renewed energy, and Group Sounds was released in 2001 to positive reviews. Some touring followed, but band members drifted into other projects and Rocket became less the focus. In 2002 Rocket released what would prove to be their final studio album, Live From Camp X-Ray, after which Reis devoted more energy to recording and touring with Hot Snakes and Sultans and to signing and producing bands for his Swami label. Rocket would perform infrequently over the next few years.

=== Breakup ===
In August 2005, after breaking up Hot Snakes, Reis announced that Rocket from the Crypt would play their final show that Halloween in San Diego. Reis has stated that he personally felt that since the band members could no longer maintain their "strenuous, military-like" daily practice sessions, and "we approached [the band] with so much zeal that anything less than the way we approached it in the past meant it wasn't the same band, pretty much," and felt keeping the gang going in that state was a waste of time. The idea of being a band that got together one day a week and practiced a couple of times before a show – it seemed like that wasn’t what we were about. It was no longer the same thing."

After a final east coast performance in New York, they played a farewell show before a capacity crowd at the Westin Horton Plaza Hotel in downtown San Diego on Halloween, which was filmed for a DVD release.

Following the band's breakup Reis focused his energy on running Swami Records and continued to play with the Sultans until their breakup in January 2007. He then formed The Night Marchers, with whom he currently performs. Reichert founded and runs the online merchandise company Merch Lackey. O'Beirne teaches project management and marketing at a San Diego high school, while Crane left San Diego semi-permanently for Belize. Stamets continues to perform in San Diego-area bands such as Beehive & the Barracudas. Rubalcaba became part-owner of the independent record store Thirsty Moon Records in the Hillcrest area of San Diego and plays with the bands Earthless and Off!. He also joined Reis in the Sultans for infrequent performances until that group's breakup in January 2007.

Swami Records released a "rough cut" of the Rocket from the Crypt farewell concert DVD in October 2006, but a fire at the offices of Fourth Project, the video company producing the DVD, pushed back the final version. It was eventually released in February 2008 as a CD/DVD set entitled R.I.P. A third installment in their rarities series, All Systems Go 3, was released on August 28, 2008. A fourth, and final, volume of the All Systems Go series is in the works, and will be a CD/DVD set.

=== Reunion ===
Rocket from the Crypt reunited, with drummer Adam Willard, in October 2011 for an episode of the children's television show Yo Gabba Gabba! Reis, who plays a recurring role on the show as "The Swami", remarked that the band was "only interested in playing to audiences of 5 to 10 people between the ages of 3 to 6" and would "most likely never play as a band ever again". They performed an original song, "He's a Chef", which was released as a single exclusively through Volcom clothing stores. In December 2012 the band announced a full reunion, resulting in gigs in the US, Europe and Australia. In March 2015, Vintage Piss was released by Sonny Vincent and Rocket from the Crypt. The album was originally recorded with Vincent in 2003 following a tour with Rocket from the Crypt serving as his backing band however the album was left unmixed and unfinished until twelve years later following the reunion of Rocket from the Crypt when John Reis decided to go back and complete the album, which he also produced.

The band continues to play sporadically, and regularly performs their annual Halloween show.

== Influences ==
Rocket From the Crypt have cited numerous band as influences, including the Music Machine, Minor Threat, James Brown, Big Black, the Gories, Wipers, the Saints, and Suicide.

== Band members ==
Current members

- Speedo (John Reis) – guitar, lead vocals (1990–2005, 2011, 2013–present)
- Petey X (Pete Reichert) – bass, backing vocals (1990–2005, 2011, 2013–present)
- ND (Andy Stamets) – guitar, backing vocals (1990–2005, 2011, 2013–present)
- Apollo 9 (Paul O'Beirne) – saxophone, percussion, backing vocals (1991–2005, 2011, 2013–present)
- JC 2000 (Jason Crane) – trumpet, percussion, backing vocals (1994–2005, 2011, 2013–present)
- Ruby Mars (Mario Rubalcaba) – drums (2001–2005, 2013–present)

Former members

- Elaina (Elaina Torres) – backing vocals (1990–1991)
- Sean (Sean Flynn) – drums (1990–1991)
- Atom (Adam Willard) – drums (1991–2000, 2011, 2013, 2014)

=== Lineups ===
(only official members listed)
1990–1991 Paint as a Fragrance	Speedo – guitar, lead vocals; ND – guitar, backing vocals; Petey X – bass, backing vocals; Sean – drums; Elaina – backing vocals
1991–1994 Circa: Now! All Systems Go	Speedo – guitar, lead vocals; ND – guitar, backing vocals; Petey X – bass, backing vocals; Apollo 9 – saxophone, percussion, backing vocals; Atom – drums
1994–2000, 2011, 2013, 2014 The State of Art Is on Fire Hot Charity Scream, Dracula, Scream! RFTC Cut Carefully and Play Loud All Systems Go 2	Speedo – guitar, lead vocals; ND – guitar, backing vocals; Petey X – bass, backing vocals; Apollo 9 – saxophone, percussion, backing vocals; JC 2000 – trumpet, percussion, backing vocals; Atom – drums
2001–2005, 2013–Present Group Sounds Live from Camp X-Ray R.I.P.	Speedo – guitar, lead vocals; ND – guitar, backing vocals; Petey X – bass, backing vocals; Apollo 9 – saxophone, percussion, backing vocals; JC 2000 – trumpet, percussion, backing vocals; Ruby Mars – drums

== Discography ==
Studio albums
Year	Title	Label
1991	Paint as a Fragrance	Cargo/Headhunter
1992	Circa: Now!	Cargo/Headhunter
1995	Hot Charity	Perfect Sound
1995	Scream, Dracula, Scream!	Interscope
1998	RFTC	Interscope
2001	Group Sounds	Vagrant
2002	Live from Camp X-Ray	Vagrant
