= Headhunter Records =

American rock music record label

- Founded: 1989
- Distributor: Cargo Music
- Genre: Punk rock, indie rock
- Country of origin: U.S.
- Location: San Diego, California
- Official website: www.cargomusic.com

Headhunter Records is an American rock music record label distributed by Cargo Music. It was founded in 1989 and is based in San Diego, California.

== Artists ==
- Armchair Martian
- Big Drill Car
- Black Heart Procession
- Boys Life
- Creedle
- Deadbolt
- Drip Tank
- Drive Like Jehu
- The Firebird Band
- Fishwife
- fluf
- Inch
- Morning Glories
- Rocket from the Crypt
- Silo the Huskie
- Slap of Reality
- Smile
- Speedbuggy USA
- Three Mile Pilot
- Pile Up
- Uncle Joe’s Big Ol’ Driver
- X-Impossibles
