= Mark Trombino =

American drummer

- Born: May 23, 1966 (age 60)
- Genres: Indie rock; pop-punk; punk rock; alternative rock; pop; hardcore punk; post-hardcore
- Occupations: Record producer, musician, audio engineer
- Instruments: Drums; percussion; keyboards
- Years active: 1991–present
- Formerly of: Drive Like Jehu; aMiniature; Night Soil Man; First Offense

Mark Trombino (born May 23, 1966) is an American record producer, musician, and audio engineer. He has produced, engineered, and mixed tracks for many artists including Jimmy Eat World, Blink-182, The Starting Line, Finch, Motion City Soundtrack, and All Time Low. As a drummer, he recorded and toured with Drive Like Jehu, aMiniature, Night Soil Man, and First Offense.

Since 2013 Trombino has been active in the boutique food space, running a donut shop called "Donut Friend" in the Highland Park neighborhood of Los Angeles. In 2019 a second location was opened in downtown Los Angeles. In January 2021, Trombino came under fire after an anonymous Twitter account claimed he terminated several employees for attempting to organize for better working conditions and form a union.

== Selected discography ==
Year	Artist	Title	Label	Role
1991	Drive Like Jehu	Drive Like Jehu	Headhunter Records	Drums, composer, producer
1994	Heavy Vegetable	Amazing Undersea Adventures of Aqua Kitty and Friends	Headhunter Records	Producer, engineer, mixer
1994	Garden Variety	Knocking the Skill Level	Headhunter Records	Mixer
1994	Drive Like Jehu	Yank Crime	Interscope Records	Mixer, engineer, drums
1994	Drip Tank	Sprawl	Headhunter Records	Producer, mixer, engineer
1995	Sinkhole	Space Freak	Dr. Strange Records	Producer, mixer, engineer
1995	Swivelneck	Baby Cry Cry	Headhunter Records	Mixer, engineer
1995	Tanner	Ill Gotten Gains	Headhunter Records	Producer, mixer, engineer
1995	aMiniature	Murk Time Cruiser	Restless Records	Mixer, engineer, drums
1995	Heavy Vegetable	Frisbee	Headhunter Records	Mixer, engineer
1995	Boys Life	Boys Life	Crank! A Record Company	Mixer, engineer
1995	Boilermaker	Watercourse	Goldenrod Records	Producer, mixer, engineer
1995	Rocket from the Crypt	Scream, Dracula, Scream!	Interscope Records	Mixer, engineer
1995	Carlos	Amy Armageddon	Headhunter Records	Mixer, engineer
1996	Chune	Big Hat, No Cattle	Headhunter Records	Mixer, engineer
1996	Wank	Get a Grip on Yourself	Warner Bros. Records	Producer
1996	Jimmy Eat World	Static Prevails	Capitol Records	Producer, mixer, engineer
1996	The PeeChees	Do the Math	Kill Rock Stars	Producer, mixer, engineer
1996	No Knife	Drunk on the Moon	Goldenrod Records	Producer, mixer, engineer
1996	Sinkhole	Core Sample	Ringing Ear Records	Producer, mixer, engineer
1996	Boilermaker	In Wallace's Shadow	Goldenrod Records	Producer, mixer, engineer
1996	Thumbnail	Thumbnail	Headhunter Records	Mixer
1996	Creedle	When the Wind Blows	Headhunter Records	Producer, mixer, engineer
1997	Crumbox	Resident Double U	Time Bomb Recordings	Mixer, engineer
1997	Go Dog Go	Glad to be Unhappy	Ichiban	Producer, mixer, engineer
1997	Knapsack	Day Three of My New Life	Alias Records	Producer, mixer, engineer
1997	Fluf	Waikiki	Headhunter Records	Mixer, engineer
1997	Blink-182	Dude Ranch	MCA Records	Producer, mixer, engineer, keyboards
1997	Thingy	Songs About Angels, Evil, and Running Around on Fire	Headhunter Records	Producer, mixer, engineer
1997	No Knife	Hit Man Dreams	Time Bomb Recordings	Producer, mixer, engineer, keyboards
1997	Three Mile Pilot	Another Desert, Another Sea	Headhunter Records	Producer, mixer, engineer
1998	The Specials	Guilty 'til Proved Innocent!	MCA Records	Mixer
1998	Fluf	Road Rage	Headhunter Records	Producer, mixer, engineer
1998	Mineral	EndSerenading	Crank! A Record Company	Producer, mixer, engineer
1998	Knapsack	This Conversation is Ending Starting Right Now	Alias Records	Producer, mixer, engineer
1998	Smile	Girl Crushes Boy	Atlantic Records	Mixer, engineer, keyboards
1999	Action League	Interrupt This Program	Vegas Records	Producer, mixer, engineer
1999	Jimmy Eat World	Clarity	Capitol Records	Producer, mixer, engineer, keyboards, string arrangements
1999	Husking Bee	Put on Fresh Paint	Doghouse	Producer, mixer, engineer
1999	The Hippos	Heads Are Gonna Roll	Interscope Records	Producer, engineer
1999	Helicopter	Helicopter	Headhunter Records	Mixer
1999	Sinkhole	Retrospecticles	Dr. Strange Records	Mixer, engineer
1999	Inch	This Will Fall on Dead Ears	Headhunter Records	Mixer, engineer, keyboards, programming
2000	Thingy	To the Innocent	Headhunter Records	Mixer, engineer
2000	Poor Rich Ones	Happy Happy Happy	Rec 90	Producer, mixer, engineer
2000	Midtown	Save the World, Lose the Girl	Drive-Thru Records	Producer, mixer, engineer
2000	Mock Orange	The Record Play	Lobster Records	Producer, mixer, engineer
2000	The Jealous Sound	The Jealous Sound	Better Looking Records	Mixer
2000	Weston	Massed Alpert Sounds	Mojo Records/Jive Records	Mixer
2000	Jebediah	Of Someday Shambles	Big Wheel Recreation	Producer, mixer, engineer
2001	Creeper Lagoon	Take Back the Universe and Give Me Yesterday	DreamWorks SKG	Producer, engineer
2001	The Moffatts	"Just Another Phase"	EMI	Mixer, engineer
2001	Bad Astronaut	Acrophobe	Honest Don's	Mixer
2001	The Icarus Line	Mono	Crank! A Record Company	Engineer
2001	Husking Bee	Four Color Problem	Doghouse	Producer, mixer, engineer
2001	Jimmy Eat World	Bleed American	Geffen Records	Producer, mixer, engineer, programming
2001	Boilermaker	Leucadia	Better Looking Records	Producer, mixer, engineer
2002	Ash	Intergalactic Sonic 7″s	Sony Music	Mixer
2002	Finch	What It Is to Burn	Drive-Thru Records/MCA	Producer, mixer, engineer, programming
2002	Midtown	Living Well is the Best Revenge	Drive-Thru Records/MCA	Producer, mixer, engineer, programming
2002	Stickfigure	Ape of the Kings	What Are Records?	Mixer
2002	Magna-Fi	Burn Out the Stars	Gold Circle Records	Mixer
2002	The Starting Line	Say It Like You Mean It	Drive-Thru Records	Producer, mixer, engineer
2003	Gob	Foot in Mouth Disease	Arista	Producer, mixer, engineer
2003	Something Corporate	Songs for Silent Movies	Drive-Thru Records/MCA	Producer
2003	Diffuser	Making the Grade	Hollywood Records	Producer, mixer, engineer, drums
2003	The Living End	Modern Artillery	Reprise Records	Producer, mixer, engineer
2003	Val Emmich	Val Emmich	Epic Records	Producer, mixer, engineer
2003	Sugarcult	Palm Trees and Power Lines	Fearless Records	Mixer
2003	Rilo Kiley	More Adventurous	Barsuk Records	Producer, engineer
2004	Denver Harbor	Scenic	Universal Records	Producer, engineer, mixer, programming
2004	Jimmy Eat World	Believe in What You Want	Interscope Records	Mixer
2004	Jimmy Eat World	Futures	Interscope Records	Original producer, engineer (sessions abandoned; album re-recorded with Gil Norton)
2004	Reeve Oliver	Reeve Oliver	The Militia Group	Mixer
2005	Motion City Soundtrack	Commit This to Memory	Epitaph Records	Mixer
2005	Gyroscope	Are You Involved?	Festival Mushroom Records	Producer
2005	The Bled	Found in the Flood	Vagrant Records	Producer, mixer, engineer
2005	Jimmy Eat World	Stay on My Side Tonight	Interscope Records	Producer, engineer
2005	Social Code	A Year at the Movies	Interscope Records	Mixer
2006	Madina Lake	From Them, Through Us, To You	Roadrunner Records	Producer, engineer, mixer
2006	Rock Kills Kid	Are You Nervous?	Reprise Records	Producer, engineer
2007	I Hate Kate	Embrace the Curse	Glass Note Records	Producer, mixer, engineer
2007	Silverstein	Arrivals & Departures	Victory Records	Producer, mixer, engineer
2007	Pinback	Autumn of the Seraphs	Touch & Go Records	Mixer
2007	Moving Units	Hexes for Exes	Metropolis Records	Engineer
2007	Steel Train	Trampoline	Drive-Thru Records	Producer, mixer, engineer
2008	Alive in Wild Paint	Ceilings	Equal Vision Records	Producer, engineer
2008	Socratic	Spread the Rumors	Drive-Thru Records	Mixer
2008	Sing It Loud	Come Around	Epitaph Records	Mixer
2009	The Audition	Self-Titled Album	Victory Records	Producer, engineer, mixer
2010	Valencia	Dancing with a Ghost	I Surrender Records	Producer, Mixer
2010	Steel Train	Steel Train	Terrible Thrills	Mixer
2010	Jimmy Eat World	Invented	Interscope Records	Producer, mixer, engineer
2011	All Time Low	Dirty Work	Geffen/Hopeless Records	Mixer
2012	Tonight Alive	What Are You So Scared Of?	Fearless Records	Producer, mixer, engineer
2013	The Wonder Years	The Greatest Generation	Hopeless Records	Mixer

== Accomplishments ==
Band	Album/single	RIAA Certification
Blink-182	Dude Ranch	Platinum
Jimmy Eat World	Bleed American	Platinum
