= The Casbah (music venue) =

Nightclub in San Diego, California, US

Coordinates: 32°43′48″N 117°10′18″W

The Casbah is a nightclub and music venue in San Diego, California, near downtown San Diego and San Diego International Airport.

== History ==
The Casbah was first opened in 1989 by Tim Mays, Bob Bennett and Peter English at the site of a former Irish pub at 2812 Kettner Boulevard. The three men also owned the now-defunct Pink Panther Club. The original Casbah location hosted San Diego bands such as Rocket from the Crypt, Lucy's Fur Coat, Trumans Water, Three Mile Pilot, Creedle, Heavy Vegetable, Fluf, Inch, Crash Worship and Deadbolt. It also hosted bands such as Nirvana and the Smashing Pumpkins. English later left the venture.

Because the original site had a maximum occupancy of 75 people, in 1994 the Casbah moved to a larger facility at 2501 Kettner Boulevard, the site of former club Bulc. The new location has a maximum occupancy of more than 200.

The club usually hosts live music six to seven nights each week. Bands that have played at the current location include Alanis Morissette, Ben Harper, Blink-182, Dead Cross, Deadbolt, Dinosaur Jr., the Breeders, the Cult, the Lumineers, Melvins and the Sadies.
