= San Diego College of Continuing Education =

Educational institution in California, USA

Coordinates: 32.6987°N 117.1015°W

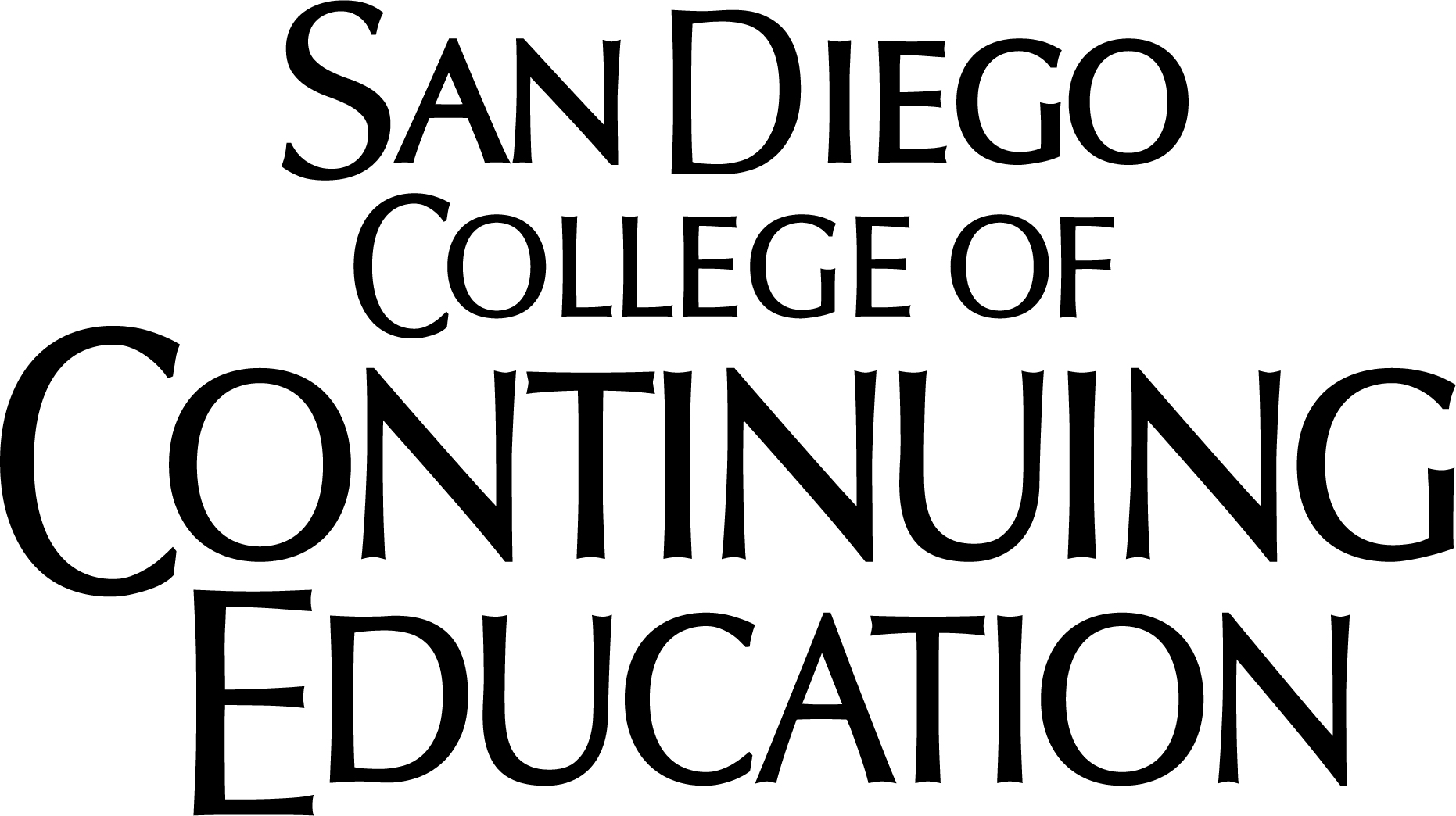
- Type: Public continuing education
- Established: 1914
- Endowment: $ 60.5 million
- President: Tina M. King, Ed.D.
- Faculty: 446
- Administrative staff: 245
- Students: 40,000+
- Location: San Diego, California, United States
- Campus: Urban, 7 main campuses citywide covering 23 acres (0.09 km^{2})
- Colors: Purple
- Website: www.sdcce.edu

San Diego College of Continuing Education (SDCCE) is a public, noncredit educational institution in San Diego, California. It is part of San Diego Community College District along with three two-year community colleges: San Diego City College, San Diego Mesa College, and San Diego Miramar College. It is accredited by the Western Association of Schools and Colleges (WASC).

SDCCE serves approximately 40,000 students per year through its seven campuses: CE at Mesa College, CE at Miramar College, Harbor View (formerly César E. Chávez Campus), the Educational Cultural Complex (ECC), Mid-City, North City and West City; it also conducts programming at various other off-campus sites throughout San Diego.

== History ==
San Diego College of Continuing Education in San Diego began in 1914 when the board of education of the San Diego City Schools authorized free night classes for adults in areas such as elementary and secondary basic skills and citizenship instruction. After World War II, adult high school classes were offered to returning veterans. In 1970 a separate community college district was established under a local governing board. In the mid-1970s, more than 100,000 adults were enrolled including Southeast Asian refugees—this gave rise to the large English as a Second Language (ESL) program that is the largest program in SDCCE. On February 1, 2021, San Diego Continuing Education (SDCE) changed its name to San Diego College of Continuing Education to reflect its growth. Today, SDCCE is the largest institution of its kind in the nation with a wide and varied curriculum.

In 2019, San Diego Continuing Education (SDCE) was awarded the title of Heather Van Sickle Entrepreneurial College of the Year, by the National Association for Community College Entrepreneurship (NACCE).

In May 2026, San Diego Community College District experienced a massive security breach as the result of hackers attacking the network. This cyberattack caused severe and prolonged disruption throughout all campuses and online. Subsequently, the District was also victimized by the simultaneous cybersecurity attack that impacted the Canvas online learning platform.
