= University of La Verne =

Private university in La Verne, California, US

Coordinates: 34.10129°N 117.77095°W

- Former names: Lordsburg College (1891–1917); La Verne College (1917–1977)
- Motto: Knowledge, Service, Vision
- Type: Private university
- Established: 1891; 135 years ago
- Religious affiliation: Secular (Historically Church of the Brethren)
- Endowment: $113.4 million (2020)
- President: Risa E. Dickson
- Undergraduates: 2,713
- Other students: 5,804
- Location: La Verne, California, United States
- Campus: Suburban, 66 acres (27 ha)
- Colors: Green and Orange
- Nickname: Leopards
- Mascots: Leo and Lea
- Website: laverne.edu

The University of La Verne (ULV) is a private university in La Verne, California, United States. Founded in 1891, the university is composed of the College of Arts & Sciences, College of Business & Public Management, the LaFetra College of Education, College of Law, College of Health and Community Well-Being, an online adult school, two military centers, and a Regional Campus Administration that oversees six regional campuses. It awards undergraduate, graduate, and doctoral degrees. Many of their classes are taught at smaller campuses throughout the greater Los Angeles area and Kern County.

== History ==
=== Lordsburg College ===
The University of La Verne was founded in 1891 as "Lordsburg College" by members of the Church of the Brethren, a German Christian sect originating from the Schwarzenau Brethren. Historically, the Brethren are considered one of the "peace churches", like the Quakers and the Mennonites, and slots on the Board of Trustees are still held for members. The baccalaureate ceremony is held at the local Church of the Brethren, and the holder of the post of campus minister must be a member of the Church of the Brethren.

The Lordsburg College originally opened in a hotel building located on the corner of 3rd Street and D Street in La Verne, CA (then called Lordsburg). The hotel is rumored to never have hosted a single paying guest, as the interest in land around Southern California had subsided by the time the hotel was complete. In 1899, two members of the Church of the Brethren repurposed the hotel as a college, purchasing it along with 100 city lots for $15,000. The Lordsburg College building was demolished in 1928, shortly after the completion of Founders Hall.

In 1901, the Los Angeles Times wrote that the Lordsburg College "seems to be predestined to an early demise." Attendance had shrunk to only 12 students, just two more than the number of faculty, and the college had been burdened by multiple scandals involving its administration. The college's second president, E.A. Miller, had a scandal in Virginia which followed him to California. William Hoover, the school's fourth president, resigned in 1901.

=== La Verne College ===
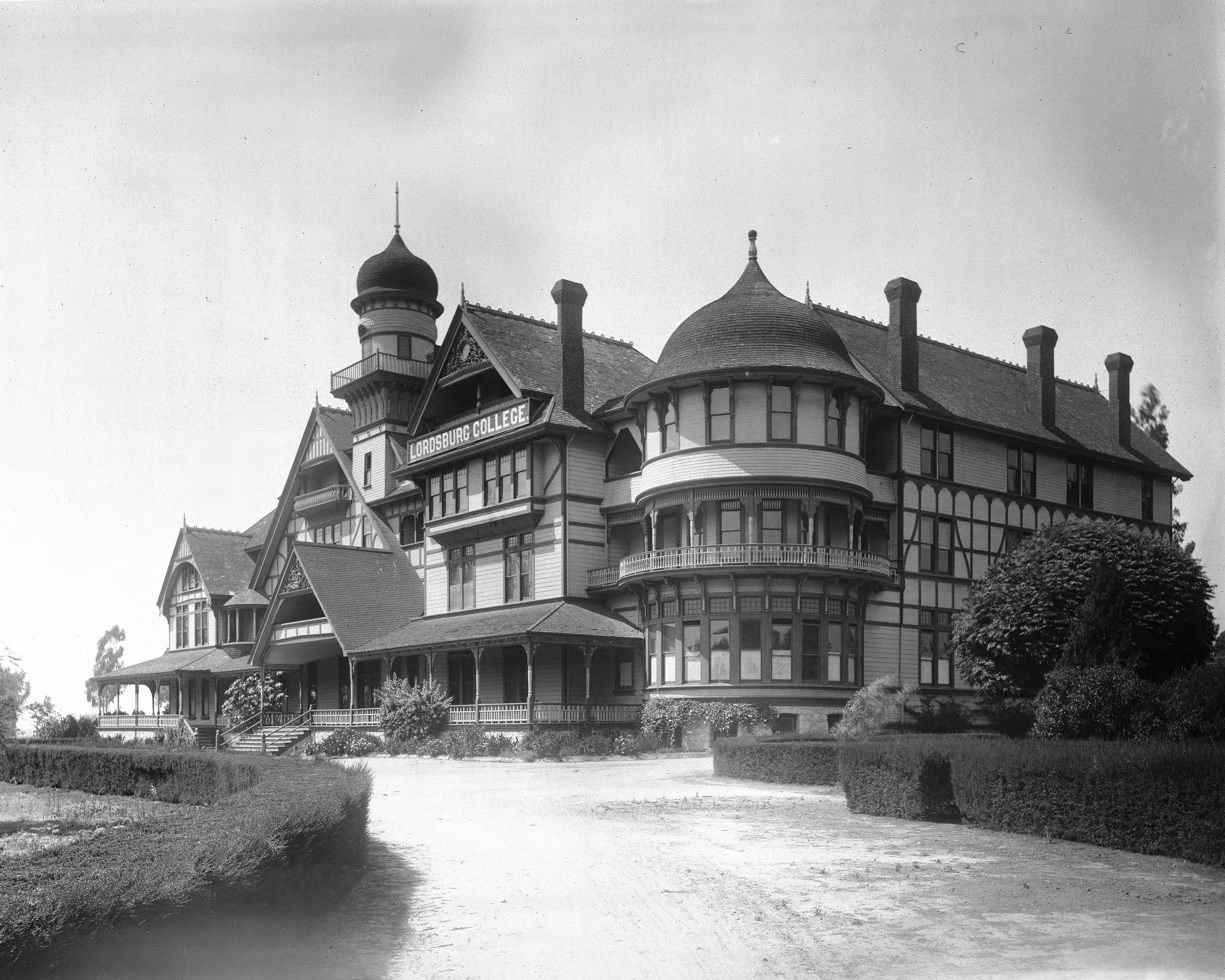
Lordsburg College c.1910

When the agricultural town of Lordsburg renamed itself to La Verne in 1917, Lordsburg College renamed itself accordingly, becoming "La Verne College". The college reorganized in 1977, 87 years after its founding, to become the University of La Verne. Since then, the university has grown to consist of the College of Arts and Sciences, the College of Business and Public Management, the LaFetra College of Education, the College of Law, and multiple regional campuses.

The University of La Verne conferred its first master's degree in 1965 and awarded its first doctorate in 1969. In 1969, La Verne began its adult education program. The university opened its first regional campus, in Orange County, in 1981 and has since opened additional locations throughout the area, including Vandenberg AFB and Pt. Mugu. Despite its Church of the Brethren heritage, the university describes itself as non-sectarian.

=== Athens, Greece ===
La Verne extended to a campus in Athens in 1975, mainly for the children of US military personnel. By the time of the sudden closure of the Athens campus in 2004, the campus operated as a franchise, sending back €690 per graduating student to the main university in California. Students and faculty were given 48 hours' notice of the closure prior to the start of classes. Stephen C. Morgan, president of La Verne at the time, justified the closure on financial grounds. The Athens campus had by 2004 gained a reputation as "one of the best private, English-language institutions in Greece".

== Enrollment and admissions ==
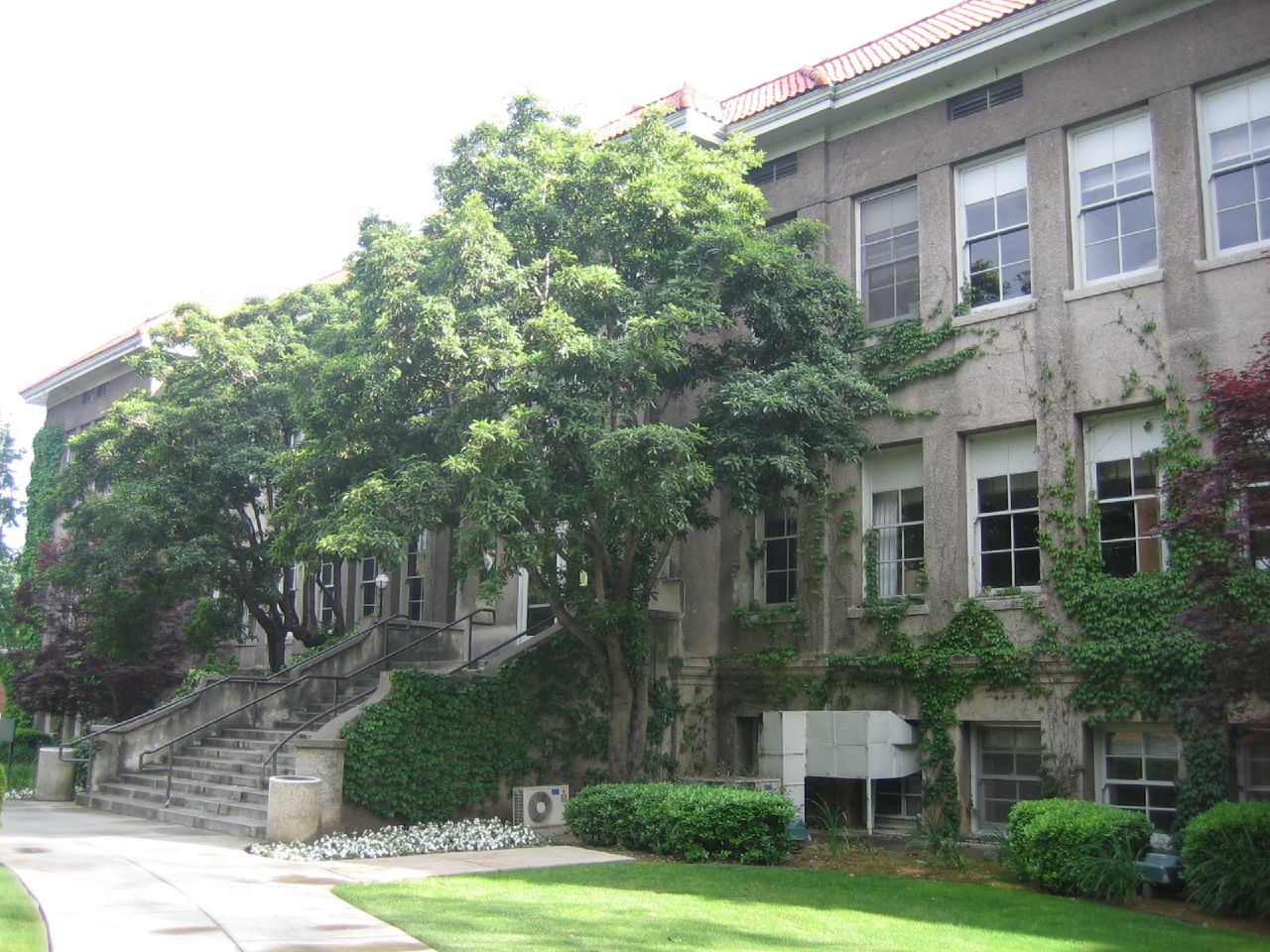
Founders Hall

The University of La Verne does not require the SAT or ACT for first-time freshmen students applying for admission. In 2024, University of La Verne accepted 73.5% of undergraduate applicants, with admission standards considered average, applicant competition considered low, and with those enrolled having an average 3.24 high school GPA. The university being a test optional school, those enrolled that submitted test scores had an average 1140 SAT score (6% submitting scores) or average 21 ACT score (1% submitting scores).

Number of Students
	2015	2016	2017	2018	2019	2020
Main campus	4,883	4,873	4,803	4,752	4,484	4,484
Regional and online	3,415	3,462	3,326	3,291	2,899	2,494
Other	36	34	30	21	13	5
Total	8,334	8,369	8,159	8,064	7,396	6,983

== Academics ==
=== Colleges ===
The University of La Verne has five colleges:

- The College of Arts and Sciences
- The LaFetra College of Education
- The College of Business and Public Management
- The College of Law
- The College of Health and Community Well-Being

=== College of Law ===
The University of La Verne College of Law was founded in 1970 and is currently located in Ontario, California. In February 2006, the college was provisionally accredited by the American Bar Association (ABA), allowing students to take the bar exam and become practicing attorneys in any U.S. jurisdiction. In June 2011, the ABA denied the College full ABA accreditation. On August 29, 2011, the college announced it received accreditation from the Committee of Bar Examiners of the State Bar of California. In March 2012, the ABA again granted provisional approval. On March 14, 2016, the ABA granted full accreditation. Of the La Verne graduates who took the California bar exam for the first time in July 2016, 31% passed, vs. a statewide average of 62%. In November 2019, the university's board of trustees voted to change from an ABA-accredited school to a California Bar-accredited school, a decision that was influenced in part by the ABA's introduction of tougher accreditation standards in May 2019 which shortened the timeframe schools had to ensure a 75-percent bar pass rate from five to two years.

=== Online school ===
The University of La Verne offers a limited number of undergraduate and graduate degree programs fully online.

=== Accreditations ===
The University of La Verne is accredited by the WASC Senior College and University Commission. Several programs are accredited or approved by discipline-specific organizations:

- The Physician Assistant program is provisionally accredited by the Accreditation Review Commission on Education for the Physician Assistant.
- The Doctorate in Clinical Psychology is accredited by the American Psychological Association.
- The Master of Public Administration program is accredited by the National Association of Schools of Public Affairs and Administration (NASPAA).
- The College of Law is accredited by the State Bar of California

=== Rankings ===
Academic rankings

National
- U.S. News & World Report: 196

The University of La Verne is ranked tied for No.196 in National Universities, tied for No.164 in Best Colleges for Veterans, tied for No.7 in Top Performers on Social Mobility, and having a $48,200 median starting salary of alumni, as reported in U.S. News & World Report's 2024-2025 Best Colleges rankings.

The University of La Verne is ranked tied for No.135 nationally in the U.S. News & World Report 2024 Best Graduate Schools ranking for Public Affairs.

== Campus ==
The University of La Verne's address is 1950 3rd Street in La Verne, California. Some of the most prominent buildings on campus include Founders Hall, which was completed in 1927, the Abraham Campus Center, the Sports Science & Athletics Pavilion, Citrus Hall, and the Wilson Library. Campus West is home to the university's baseball and softball fields. Some of the oldest buildings still standing on campus include Founders Hall, Miller Hall (constructed in 1918), and the Hanawalt House (constructed in 1905).

=== Student housing ===
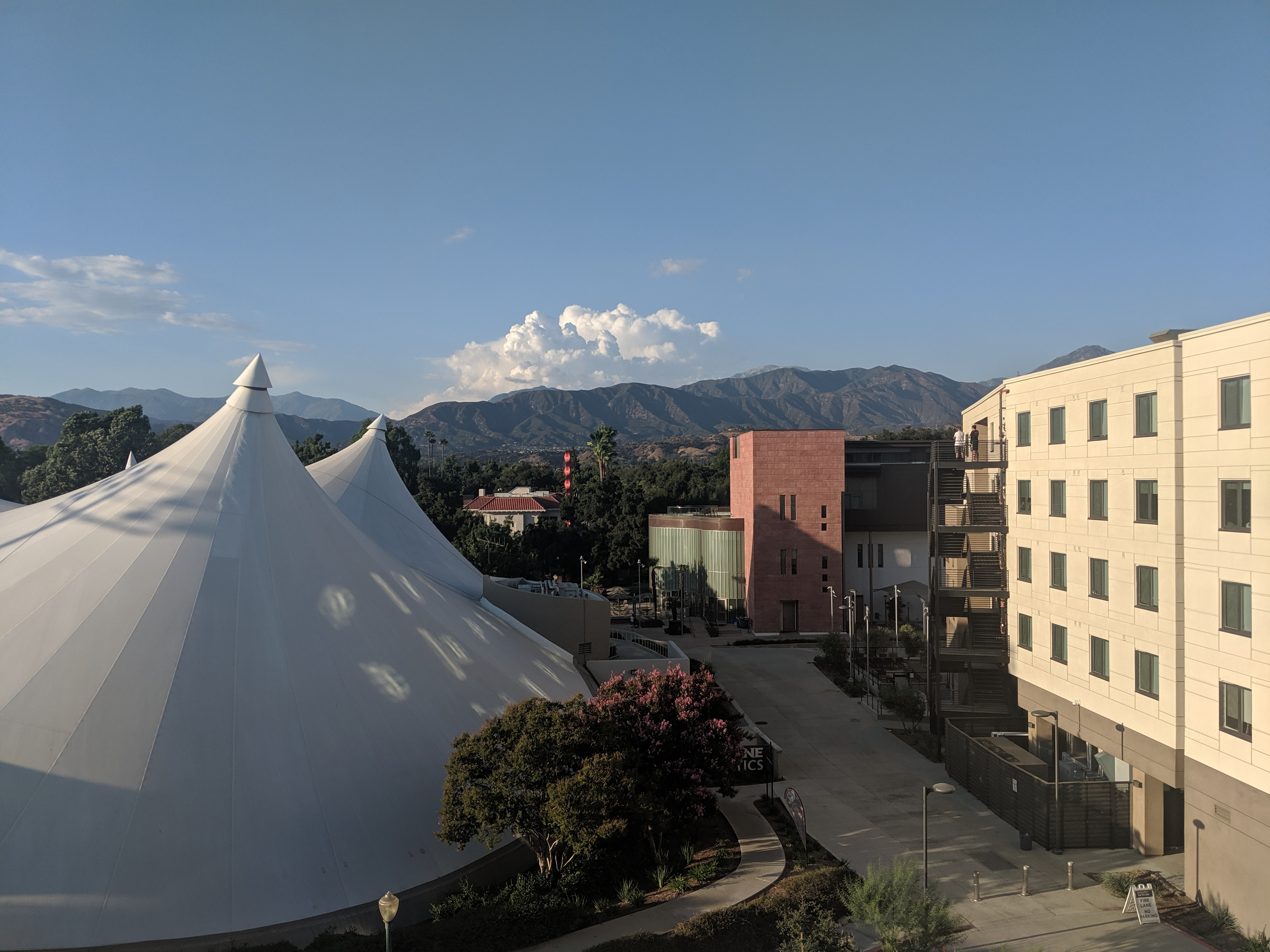
The Sports Science and Athletics Pavilion

There are three student dorm buildings on the campus. Citrus Hall opened for the Fall 2018 semester and houses about 400 students. The Spot dining hall, located on the first floor of Citrus Hall, opened at the same time, replacing the Davenport Dining Hall.

=== Sports Science and Athletics Pavilion ===
The Sports Science and Athletics Pavilion, or SSAP, is a large tent structure located in the central campus, between the football stadium and Citrus Hall. The SSAP has an indoor basketball/volleyball court, workout rooms, locker rooms, classrooms, and various other facilities. When first constructed in the 1970s, the building contained facilities for the Athletics Department, Art Department, and the schools radio and TV stations. The SSAP also contained a snack bar and game area for students. The building now serves only the athletics department for the most part, as the Art and Communications departments now have their own building on D Street. The Campus Center now serves the functions the snack bar and game area once did.

A smaller tent located next to the SSAP contains the Dailey Theatre and other facilities for the Theatre Department.

Often referred to as "The Tents," or the "Super Tents," they were the "world’s first permanent–tensioned membrane structure" when completed in the early 1970s. They are constructed using a fabric made from woven fiberglass coated with Teflon.

=== Wilson Library ===
The Elvin and Betty Wilson Library is the university's main library.

An Alpha Beta supermarket was constructed on the corner of 'D' street and second street in 1955. The site was previously occupied by a park, which had been constructed after the demolition of the original Lordsburg College building. In 1977, the University purchased the Alpha Beta supermarket and converted it into a new library. This was done with the help of contributions made by Elvin and Betty Wilson, the donors the library is now named after. The library was closed between 1993 and 1996 to allow for expansion, again with the help of the same donors.

The library is a two-story building, but has two level for books per floor, making it seem like a four-story building. The first floor has study and meeting rooms, a help desk, offices, and paid printing facilities. The second floor (third level) contains the Honors Center and one classroom. The university's archives and special collections are located on the fourth level.

=== Transportation ===
The University is served by the LA Metro's A line at La Verne/Fairplex station, which is located at the corner of 'E' Street and Arrow Highway.

== Student life and traditions ==
=== Greek life ===
The University of La Verne has chapters of five sororities and two fraternities.

=== The Rock ===
The rock has been a tradition at the University of La Verne for more than 60 years. The original rock was painted orange with the letters "LVC," because the school was named La Verne College at the time. In the 1960s La Verne students took it upon themselves to replace the rock with a much larger one. They buried much of it so that it would not be stolen by rival schools, as the original rock had been in the past.

The new rock would be painted by clubs and organizations, sometimes being repainted overnight to prank other students. This tradition continues, but students must reserve the rock before painting it.

=== Student government ===
The Associated Students of the University of La Verne (ASULV) is the university's student government.

=== Homecoming ===
Each year, at homecoming, a street fair is held on 3rd Street, outside Founders Hall. A parade is also hosted with student made floats.

== Campus locations ==
=== United States ===
- Main Campus in La Verne
- University of La Verne College of Law in Ontario
- La Verne High Desert in Victorville
- La Verne Inland Empire in Ontario
- La Verne Kern County in Bakersfield
- La Verne Orange County in Irvine
- La Verne San Fernando Valley in Burbank
- La Verne Ventura County in Oxnard

Military satellite campuses:

- Point Mugu NAS
- Vandenberg SFB

== Athletics ==
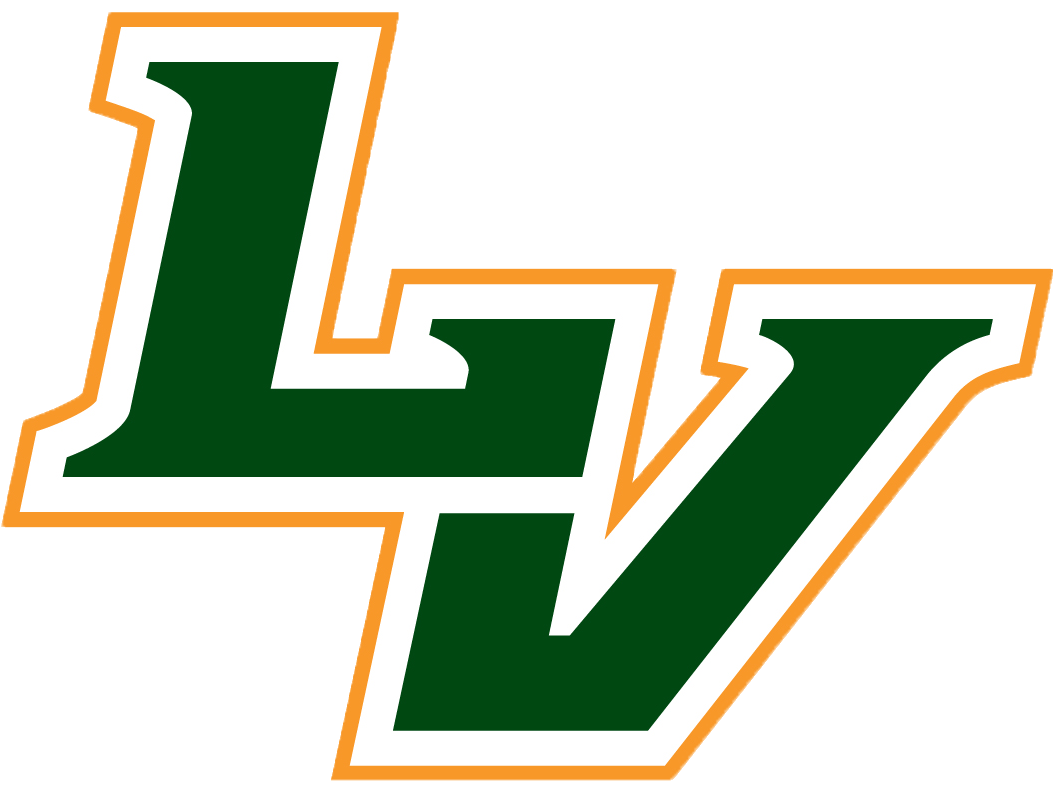
La Verne athletics monogram

Men's sports	Women's sports
Baseball	Basketball
Basketball	Cross country
Cross country	Golf
Football	Soccer
Golf	Softball
Soccer	Swimming
Swimming	Track and field
Track and field	Volleyball
Water polo	Water polo

La Verne athletics teams are nicknamed the Leopards. The university has captured numerous SCIAC Championships, and has claimed NCAA team titles in baseball (1995), men's volleyball (1999).

Football had an undefeated conference season in 2015.

La Verne offers 18 intercollegiate athletic teams—9 sports for men and 9 for women. The Leopards are a member of the Southern California Intercollegiate Athletic Conference (SCIAC) and compete at the NCAA Division III level.

== Notable alumni ==
- Art Acevedo – chief of police
- Joseph Ashton – actor
- Vernard Eller – author
- Phil Esbenshade – Professional skateboarder and attorney
- Roger Hernández – Democratic member of the California State Assembly
- David Hollinger – historian
- Darren Kavinoky – motivational speaker
- Larry Kennan – Executive director of NFL Coaches Association (NFLCA)
- Nick Leyva – baseball player, coach, and manager
- Ross Mathews – television host
- Mike Morrell – Republican member of the California State Assembly
- Ryan O'Donohue - Actor
- Steve Ortmayer – football coach
- Dan Quisenberry – baseball player
- Alex Villanueva – sheriff
- Joaquin Zendejas – football player
- Anthony Zuiker – creator and executive producer

== Notable faculty ==
- Eldridge Cleaver – activist, author, early leader of the Black Panther Party
