= Rob Crow =

American musician

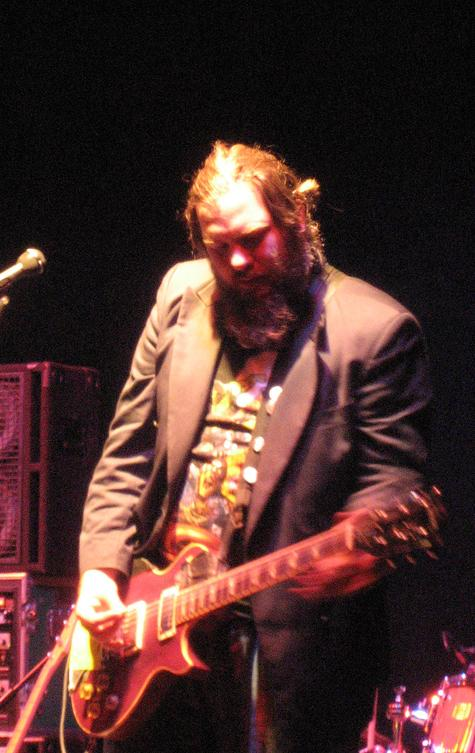
- Crow performing in July, 2009

Background information
- Also known as: Snotnose
- Born: Robertdale Rulon Crow Jr. February 21, 1971 (age 55); New Jersey, U.S.
- Origin: Encinitas, California, U.S.
- Genres: Indie rock; math rock; stoner metal
- Occupations: Singer; musician; songwriter
- Instruments: Vocals; guitar; drums; keyboards
- Years active: 1993–present
- Labels: Touch & Go; Temporary Residence; Absolutely Kosher; Joyful Noise Recordings

Robertdale Rulon Crow Jr. (born February 21, 1971) is an American singer and musician from San Diego, California, known for his involvement with the bands Pinback, Heavy Vegetable, Physics, Optiganally Yours, Goblin Cock, Thingy, and Team Sleep. He has also led the bands Advertising, Alpha Males, Altron Tube, Byre, Cthugha, Fantasy Mission Force, Holy Smokes, the Ladies, Other Men, and Remote Action Sequence Project, as well as performing and releasing solo records under his own name and under the name Snotnose.

== Discography ==
=== Solo ===
- The 1995 Lesser Rob Crow Split CD (1995) (split with Lesser)
- Lactose Adept (1996)
- My Room Is a Mess (2003)
- Not Making Any Friends Here... Volume 1 EP (2006)
- Living Well (2007)
- He Thinks He's People (2011)
- Everything's OK: Season 1 Original Soundtrack (2018)
- Everybody's Got Damage: Acoustic Covers In Isolation (2020)
- An EP of Acoustic Iron Maiden Covers (2020) (featuring Kavus Torabi and Mike Vennart)
- The "You're Doomed. Be Nice." Demos (2021)

=== Aspects of Physics ===
- Marginalized Information Forms 3: Other (2009)

=== Anal Trump ===
- That Makes Me Smart! (2016)
- To All the Broads I've Nailed Before (2017)
- If You Thought Six Million Jews Was A Lot Of People, You Should've Seen My Inauguration (2017)
- If You Wanted To Qualify For Health Insurance, Then Maybe You Shouldn't Have Gotten Raped? (2017)
- Make America Say Merry Christmas Again (2017)
- The First 100 Songs compilation (2018)

=== Byre ===
- Here In Dead Lights (2018)

=== Fantasy Mission Force ===
- Circus Atari EP (1997)

=== Goblin Cock ===
- Goblin Cock discography

=== Heavy Vegetable ===
- Heavy Vegetable discography

=== Holy Smokes ===
- Talk To Your Kids About Gangs (2006)

=== The Ladies ===
- They Mean Us (2006)

=== Optiganally Yours ===
- Spotlight On Optiganally Yours (1997)
- Presents: Exclusively Talentmaker! (2000)
- O.Y. In Hi-Fi (2018)

=== Other Men ===
- Wake Up Swimming (2007)
- For the Purposes of This Conversation (2018) (as Other)

=== Physics ===
- Physics² (1998)
- 2.7.98 (2001)
- 1999-11-21 (2002)
- ³ (2018)

=== PLOSIVS ===
- Plosivs (2022)
- Yell at Cloud (2025)

=== Pinback ===
- Pinback discography

=== Rob Crow's Gloomy Place ===
- You're Doomed. Be Nice. (2016)

=== Remote Action Sequence Project ===
- Remote Action Sequence Project cassette (1995)
- The Semi-Glorified Demos of Remote Action Sequence Project (2018)

=== Snotnose ===
- A Distraction (2018)

=== Star Stunted/Star Stunted II ===
- Santa Dog (2022)
- Mahogany Wood (2024)

=== Team Sleep ===
- Team Sleep (2006)

=== Thingy ===
- Thingy discography

=== Third Act Problems ===
- The Sun Setting Over the Argosy Book Store (2018)

=== Guest appearances ===
- Boilermaker – Boilermaker EP (1993) (guitar/vocals)
- Boilermaker – Drained Nonsense EP (1993) (guitar/vocals)
- Drive Like Jehu – Yank Crime (1994) (vocals on "Luau")
- Creedle – When the Wind Blows (1996) (vocals)
- Team Sleep – Team Sleep (2005) (vocals)
- Sleeping People – Growing (2007) (vocals on "People Staying Awake")
- Prefuse 73 – Rivington Não Rio (2015) ("Quiet One")
- Nick Prol & The Proletarians – Loon Attic (2017) (guitar/backing vocals on "Beekeeper's Suit")
- Tera Melos – "Lemon Grove" (2018) (words and voice)
- Hot Snakes – Jericho Sirens (2018)
- Cardiacs – LSD (2025) (drum programming)
