= Drunk on the Moon =

Studio album by No Knife
- Released: April 1996
- Recorded: February 1995
- Label: Goldenrod Records Time Bomb Records.

No Knife chronology
Drunk on the Moon (1996)	Hit Man Dreams (1997)

Professional ratings
Review scores
Source	Rating
AllMusic	3/5 stars

Drunk on the Moon is the first full-length album by No Knife, released in April 1996 on Goldenrod Records. It was later re-released on Time Bomb Records.

== Track listing ==
1. "Be Mini" (Mitch Wilson) - 4:05
2. "Ginger Vitus" (Matt Reese, Wilson) - 4:30
3. "Habits" (Jeremy Blatchley, Reese, Wilson) - 4:46
4. "Punch 'n' Judy" (Wilson) - 5:07
5. "At the Heart of the Terminal" (Wilson) - 4:31
6. "Kiss Your Killer" (Brian Desjean, Aaron Mancini, Wilson) - 3:38
7. "Ephedrine" (Wilson) - 5:18
8. "Small of My Back" (Wilson) - 5:29
9. "...If I Could Float..." (Wilson) - 3:10
10. "Titanic" (Wilson) - 1:02
11. "Daniels" (Reese, Wilson) - 1:48

== Personnel ==
- Mitch Wilson – guitar, vocals, artwork
- Aaron Mancini – guitar
- Brian Desjean – bass
- Ike Zaremba – drums, backing vocals
- Kym Clift – vocals
- Matt Reese – vocals
- Mark Trombino – tambourine, producer, recording engineer
- Mark Waters – executive producer
- Tod Swank – executive producer
- Mike Ballard – photography
- Miki Vuckovich – live photography
