= San Diego Community College District =

College in San Diego

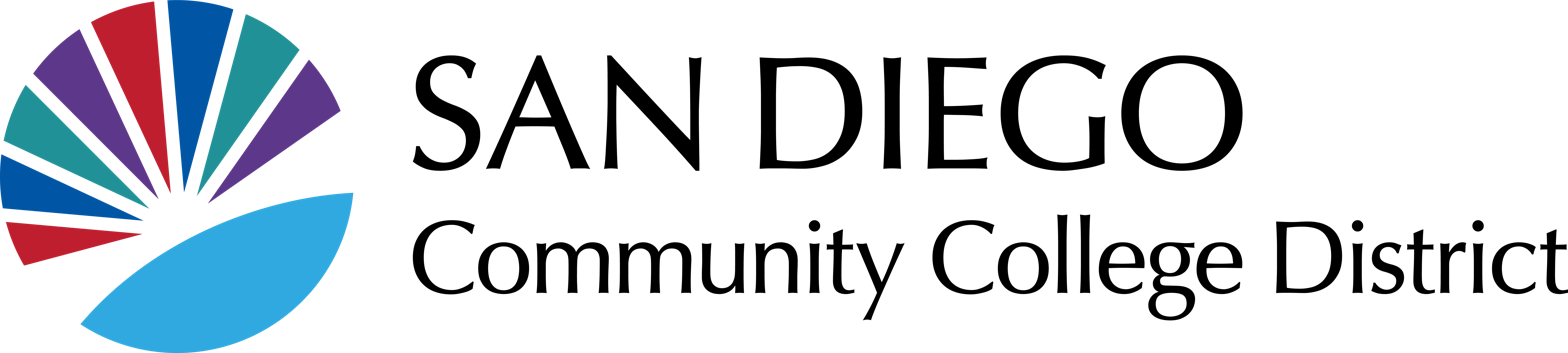
- Motto: Be. Belong. Become.
- Type: Public community college District
- Established: 1972|01|01
- Accreditation: ACCJC
- Endowment: $694.6 million
- Chancellor: Gregory A. Smith
- Administrative staff: 6,804
- Students: 101,879 (Districtwide)
- Undergraduates: 65,615 (Community Colleges)
- Other students: 37,594 (Continuing Education)
- Location: San Diego, California, United States
- Campus: 3 campuses for each credit community college, 7 campuses for the College of Continuing Education
- Colors: District Cyan, District Orange, and District Green
- Website: www.sdccd.edu www.sdcce.edu

San Diego Community College District (SDCCD) is a community college district based in San Diego, California. It operates three credit colleges, San Diego City College, San Diego Mesa College, and San Diego Miramar College. The San Diego College of Continuing Education is a noncredit institution with seven campuses: Harbor View (formerly known as Cesar E. Chavez) Campus, CE at Mesa College, CE at Miramar College, Educational Cultural Complex, North City Campus, Mid-City Campus, and West City Center. The district is part of the California Community Colleges system. Colleges in the district offer associate degrees and technical certificates.

== History ==
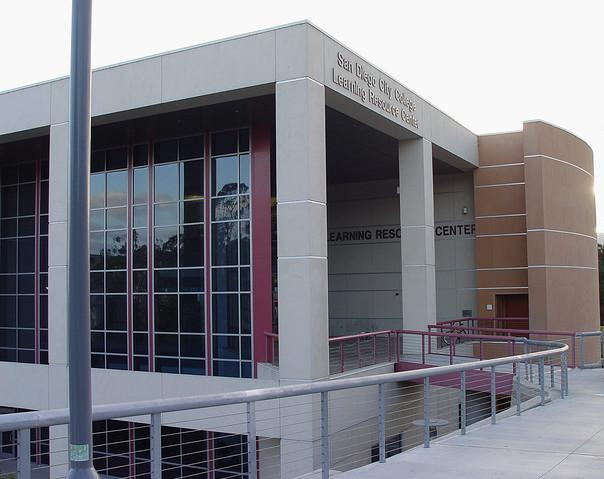
City College (1914)

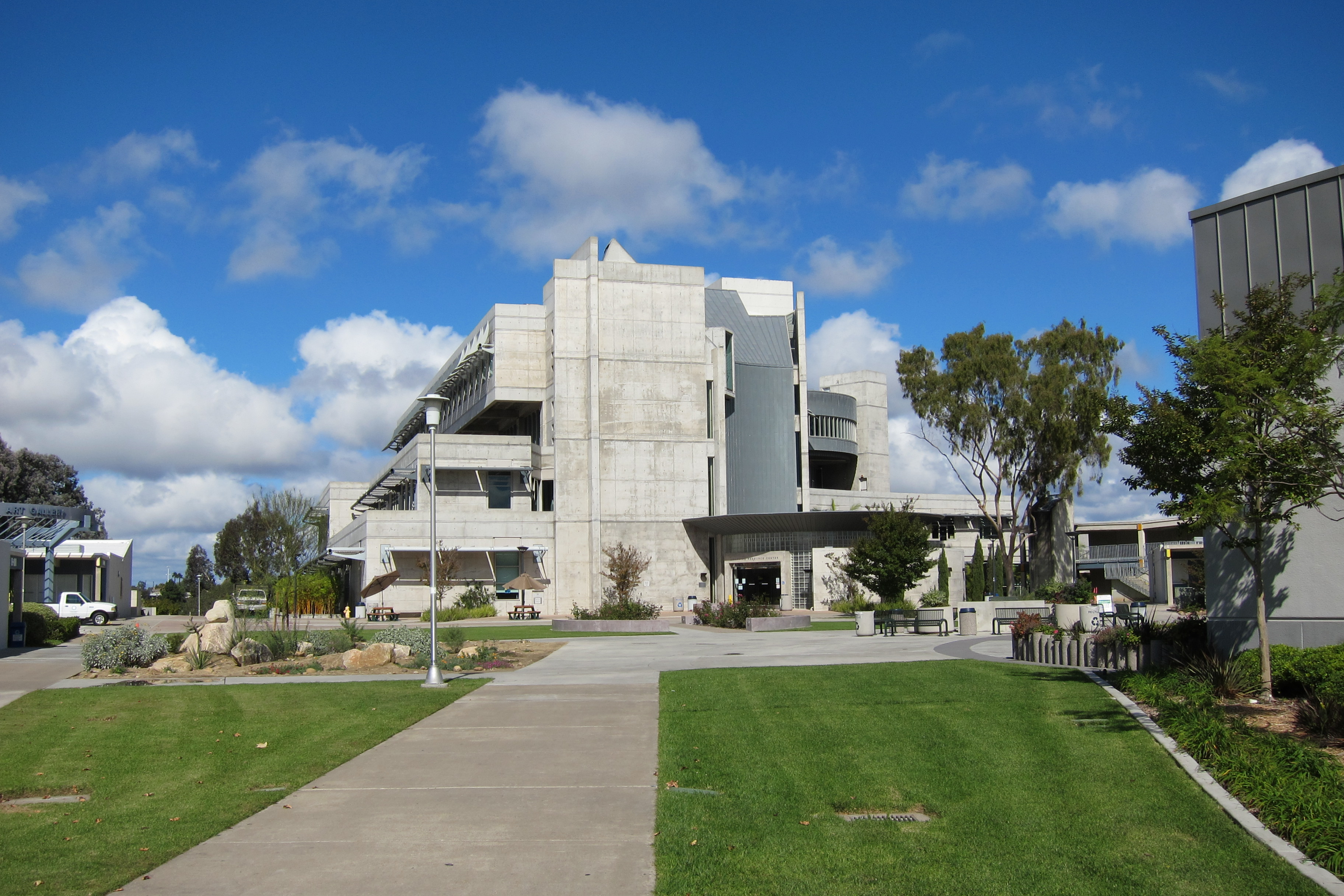
Mesa College (1964)

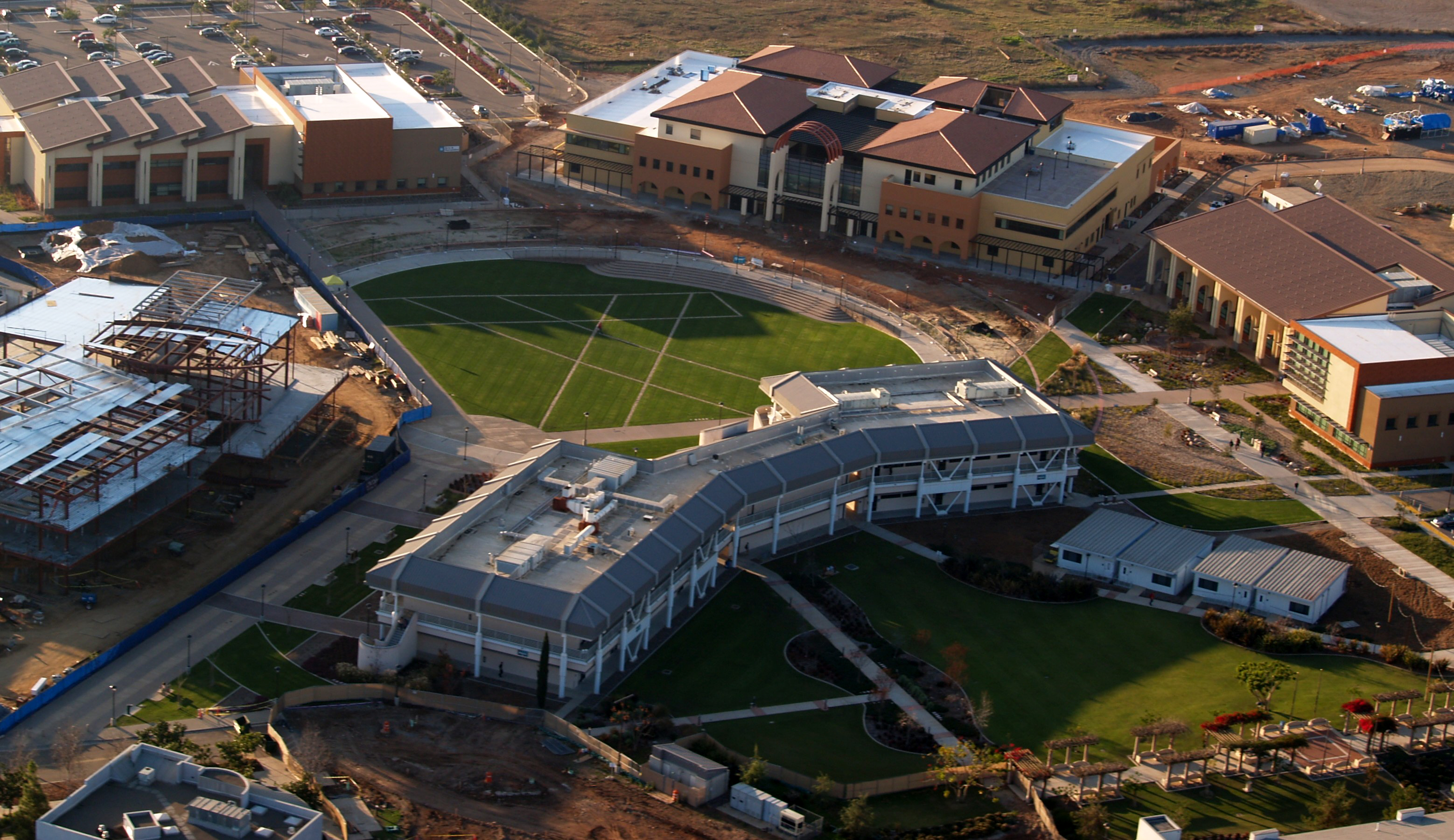
Miramar College (1969)

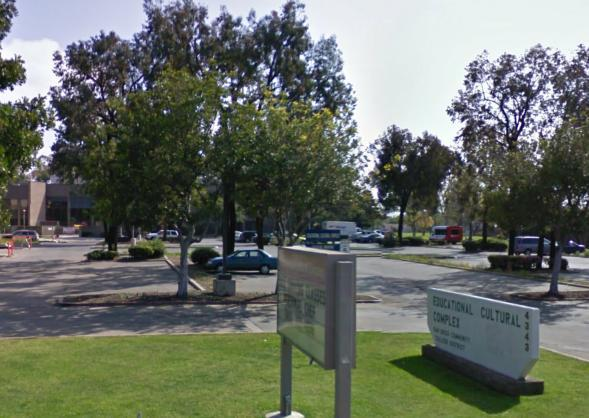
ECC (1976)

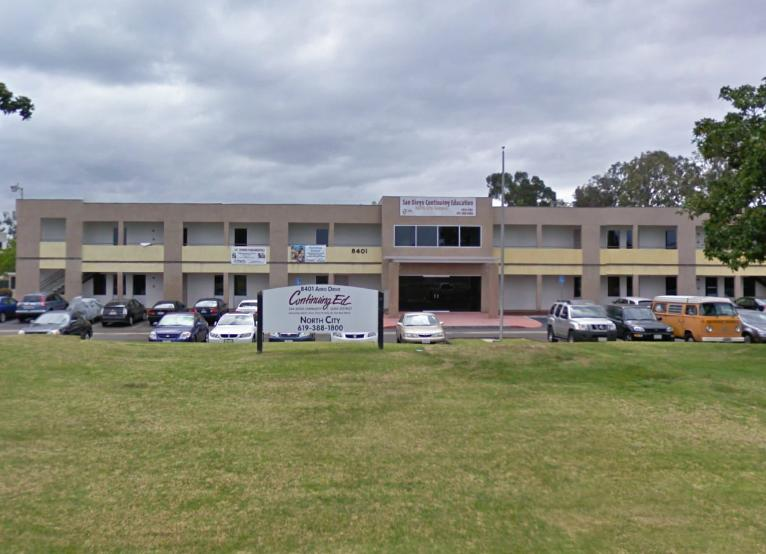
North City (1980)

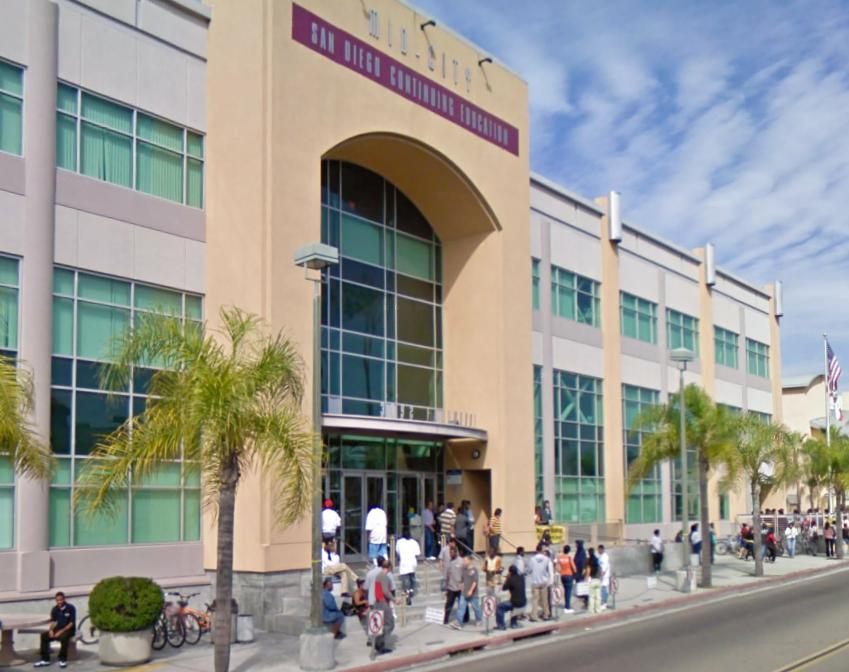
Mid-City (2009)

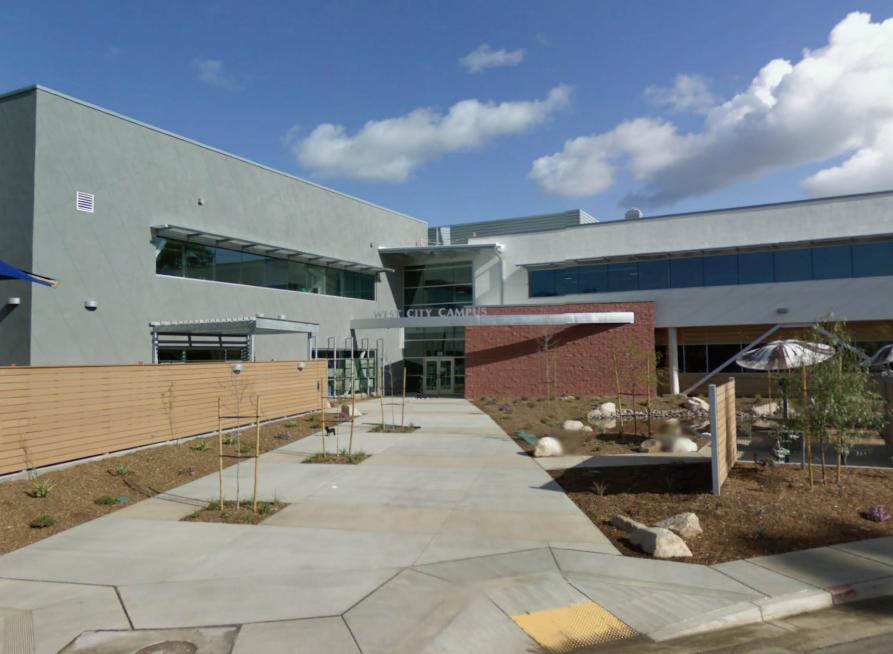
West City (2009)

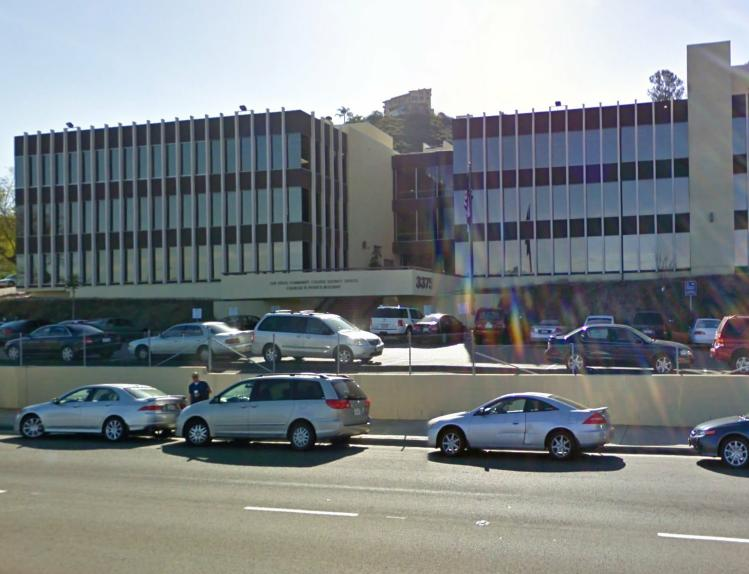
SDCCD Office of the Chancellor and Board of Trustees (1973)

Community college education in San Diego can be traced to 1914 when the board of education of the San Diego City Schools authorized postsecondary classes for the youth of San Diego. Classes opened that fall at San Diego High School with four faculty members and 35 students, establishing San Diego City College.

In 1921, City College moved from the high school to share facilities with the State Normal School, the four-year teachers' college which, in 1898, became San Diego State University. For 25 years, the Junior College program remained at San Diego State University. During this period, in 1938, the San Diego Vocational Junior College was established to offer training in technical-vocational skills to post high school students. The following year, the San Diego Evening Junior College was set up to provide college classes in the evening for adults who were unable to attend classes during the day.

In 1946, City College moved back to San Diego High School and reorganized into three branches: San Diego Vocational High School, San Diego College Arts and Sciences, and San Diego Evening Junior College. City College continued to grow during the 1950s and 60s as land was acquired to allow expansion through various blocks of today's northeast downtown San Diego.

In 1964, San Diego Mesa College was opened to 1,800 students. Five years later, in 1969, San Diego Miramar College opened on 140 acres in what was then undeveloped land north of the Miramar Naval Air Station, now known as Mira Mesa. Unlike City and Mesa Colleges which offered a wide range of general education classes, Miramar College began by concentrating on law enforcement and fire science training. It has since broadened its curriculum to include the general education college courses needed by students in the rapidly growing northern area of the city, as well as new transfer and vocational programs.

In November 1972, the voters approved separating San Diego Community College District from the San Diego Unified School District. The first election of community college district trustees was held in November 1973.

The year 1976 brought the opening of a unique district campus, the Educational Cultural Complex, dedicated to offering both college and continuing education classes to the multicultural population surrounding its Ocean View Boulevard site. In 1979–80 the administration of the Evening College program was merged with those of the day college programs at San Diego City, San Diego Mesa, and San Diego Miramar Colleges. With both credit colleges and College of Continuing Education programs, as well as extensive educational programs at military bases across the nation, San Diego Community College District became second-largest community college district in California.

=== Recent times ===
All campuses have received extensive expansion and renovations in the last 20 years:

Propositions S and N-funded projects for the 60-acre City College have included six new instructional and career training facilities, eight major renovations, and new parking, public safety, and infrastructure projects. These have included facilities or major renovations to support in-demand programs including Nursing, Manufacturing Engineering Technology, Energy and Geo-Environmental Engineering, Geographic Information Systems (GIS), and dozens more. A new Cyber Defense and Analysis Baccalaureate Program will launch as early as fall of 2024.

The projects have provided for updated infrastructure, safety upgrades and improvements to support ADA compliance, and extensive hardscape and landscape to create numerous outdoor learning and gathering spaces.

At Mesa College, Propositions S & N-funded projects have included six new academic and career training facilities, two campus support facilities, five major renovation projects, and numerous infrastructure, parking, and public safety projects. These have included state-of-the-art facilities to support in-demand career training and academic programs, including Health Information Management (which offers a Bachelor of Science Degree), Computer and Information Systems, Building Construction Technology, Culinary Arts, Child Development, and multiple other career or transfer fields.

Geographically the largest campus property within the District, the 120-acre San Diego Miramar College originally opened as a training facility for San Diego's law enforcement personnel and firefighters in 1969. It has grown into one of the fastest-growing colleges in the county. Propositions S & N-funded projects for Miramar College include eight new instructional and career training facilities, five major renovations, parking facilities, public safety enhancements, numerous infrastructure projects and new campus support and operational facilities. These ave included facilities to support the Southern California Biotechnology Center, Advanced Transportation and Energy Center, and the San Diego Regional Public Safety Institute, which comprises the San Diego Law Enforcement Academy and the Fire Technology & EMT program.

San Diego College of Continuing Education is made up of seven unique campuses located throughout San Diego. Propositions S & N-funded projects for Continuing Education included the construction of six new campus facilities - Mid-City Campus, North City Campus, West City Campus, Continuing Education Mesa College Campus, Continuing Education Miramar College Campus, Harbor View (formerly known as César E. Chávez) Campus, and the new Skills Center at the Educational Cultural Complex (ECC). The bond program also provided for a complete seismic retrofit for the Centre City Campus.

In May 2026, San Diego Community College District experienced a massive security breach as the result of hackers attacking the network. This cyberattack caused severe and prolonged disruption throughout all campuses and online. Subsequently, the District was also victimized by the simultaneous cybersecurity attack that impacted the Canvas online learning platform.

== Governance ==
San Diego Community College District is governed by a five-member, locally elected board of trustees and three student members serving on a rotating basis, representing each of the three colleges. The sitting student trustee has an advisory vote on the Board. Shared governance activities involve faculty, students and staff in the development of solutions to key policy and budget issues. The five trustees are elected in even-numbered years to four-year terms by the voters of San Diego. Trustee candidates first run in district-only elections. The top two vote-getters in each district run citywide in the general election.

Each college of the SDCCD, including Continuing Education, is headed by a president and three vice presidents overseeing instruction, administrative services, and student services, respectively. Each academic school department is headed by a dean.

== Campuses ==
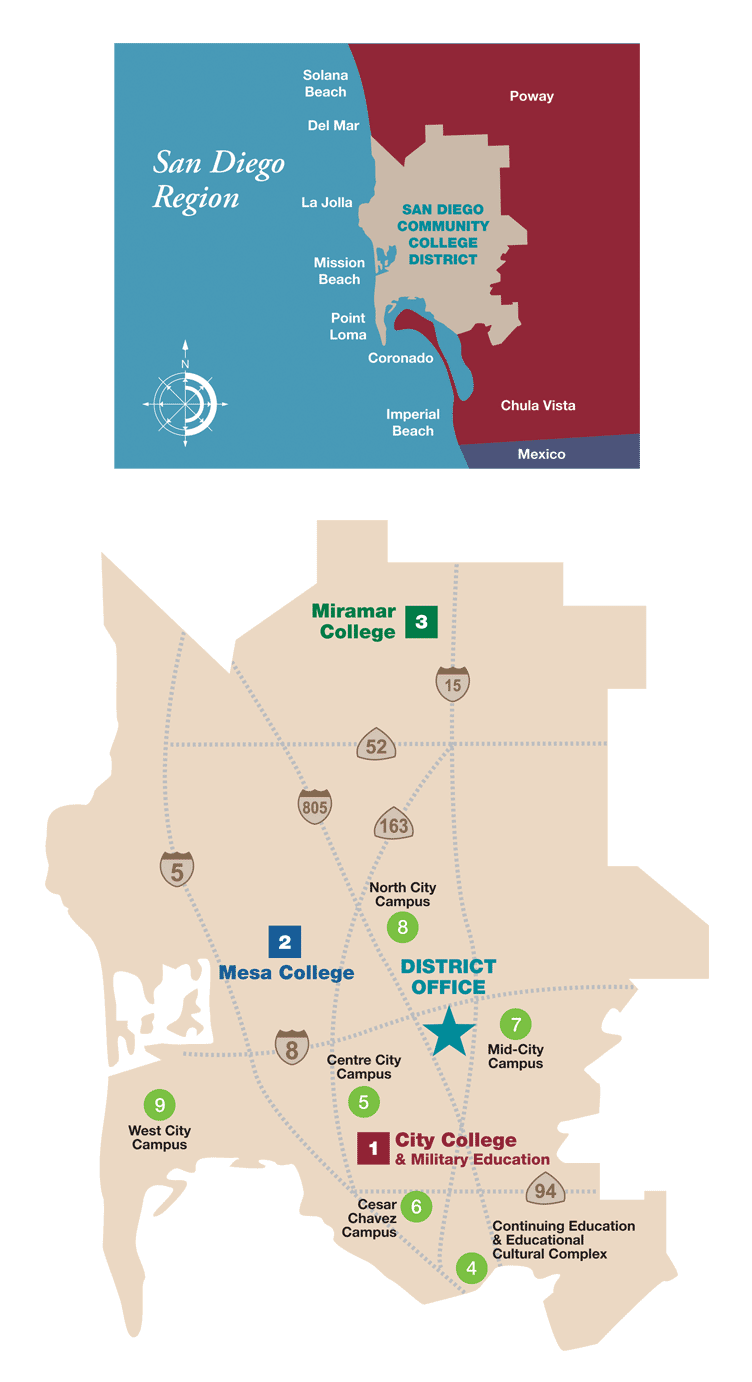
This map shows the locations of the three San Diego Community College campuses and the seven Continuing Education campuses as well as the District office.

San Diego Community College District consists of three credit colleges, San Diego City College, Mesa College, and Miramar College, as well as seven campuses of San Diego College of Continuing Education: Harbor View (formerly known as Cesar E. Chavez campus), CE at Mesa College, CE at Miramar College, Educational Cultural Complex, North City Campus, Mid-City Campus, and West City Center.

All institutions serve approximately 80,000 students. The three credit colleges offer associate degrees and certificates in occupational programs that prepare students for entry-level jobs, and arts and sciences programs that transfer to four-year colleges and universities. Mesa College offers a bachelor's degree in health information management. The College of Continuing Education's Educational Cultural Complex (ECC) also offers classes leading to associate degrees and certificates.

The College of Continuing Education campuses offer adults noncredit vocational, basic skills, life skills, and enrichment classes at sites throughout the city. A number of special programs are unique to the city, including KSDS-FM all-jazz radio, the Center for Competitive and Applied Technologies, the Acquired Brain Injury Cognitive Rehabilitation Program, and the Workplace Learning Resource Center.

=== San Diego City College ===
Located in downtown San Diego as the first community college in the city and the third in California, City College sits on 60 acres and offers over 100 majors to more than 20,000 students. Besides general education, transfer and AA/AS degree programs, some of the disciplines available at City are:

- Alcohol and drug abuse counseling
- Cooling and heating technologies
- Cosmetology
- Engineering and electronics
- Graphic design
- Machines and manufacturing
- Nursing
- Radio and television
- Small business operation

=== San Diego Mesa College ===
As one of the largest and most successful of California's 112 community colleges, and as the largest college in San Diego Community College District, Mesa College opened in 1964 and it now serves over 24,000 students on a campus of 104 acres offering more than 150 programs of instruction. Among its unique programs available on campus are:

- Animal health technology
- Dental assisting
- Health information technology
- Medical assisting
- Physical therapist assistant
- Radiological technology
- Bachelor's degree in health information management

=== San Diego Miramar College ===
Located on 120 acres in the Mira Mesa/Scripps Ranch suburban area of San Diego along the I-15 corridor, Miramar opened as a training facility for San Diego's law enforcement personnel and firefighters in 1969.

Today, Miramar College offers over 120 certificates, associate degrees, and comprehensive 4-year university transfer programs and is home to the Southern California Biotechnology Center, the Advanced Transportation and Energy Center, and the San Diego Regional Public Safety Institute which provides training for nearly all law enforcement officers and firefighters within San Diego County and also trains EMTs and offers the only open water lifeguard degree in the world. Miramar has the only entry-level biotechnology program in San Diego County. Miramar boasts unique career training in the following:

- Alternative fuels
- Automotive technologies
- Aviation maintenance and Operations
- Banking and Finance
- Biotechnology
- Diesel technologies and heavy equipment repair
- Fire technology
- Hazardous materials
- International business
- Paralegal

=== San Diego College of Continuing Education ===
San Diego College of Continuing Education was the first and remains the only community college continuing education institution in California to meet the standards for independent accreditation from the Western Association of Schools and Colleges. The College of Continuing Education was also one of the first in California to establish a Joint High School Diploma partnership with the local school district, and was also among the first continuing education programs in California to serve 100,000 students per academic year.

Today, the College of Continuing Education consists of seven campuses and 56 partnered locations throughout the city where instruction may be offered in collaboration with schools, community service providers, and other institutions. Instruction offered at Continuing Education includes:

- Computer information technology
- Career training
- Disability support programs
- Emeritus program for older adults
- English as a second language (ESL)
- GED/high school diploma
- Parenting education
- U.S. Citizenship preparation

== Admissions ==
San Diego Community College District conducts open enrollment in all of its three community colleges and seven Continuing Education campuses.

== Academics ==
City College, Mesa College, and Miramar College as public two-year community colleges administered by San Diego Community College District offer credit programs leading to degrees, transfer, employment, and skills improvement along with the District's Continuing Education division of seven major campuses throughout San Diego.

As required by the voters of San Diego in 1972, San Diego Community College District is to provide education for all high school graduates and adults 18 years of age and older in the service region. This charge includes providing adult basic education, including GED/High School Diploma, through sophomore-level college degree programs, with both academic and vocational curricula.

San Diego Community Colleges offer over 130 individual disciplines with over 300 academic programs that lead to associate degrees or Certificates of Performance. Academics are held within individual schools at each college which in turn are divided into separate departments holding their areas of study and instruction.
