= Pierre de Gaillande =

American musician

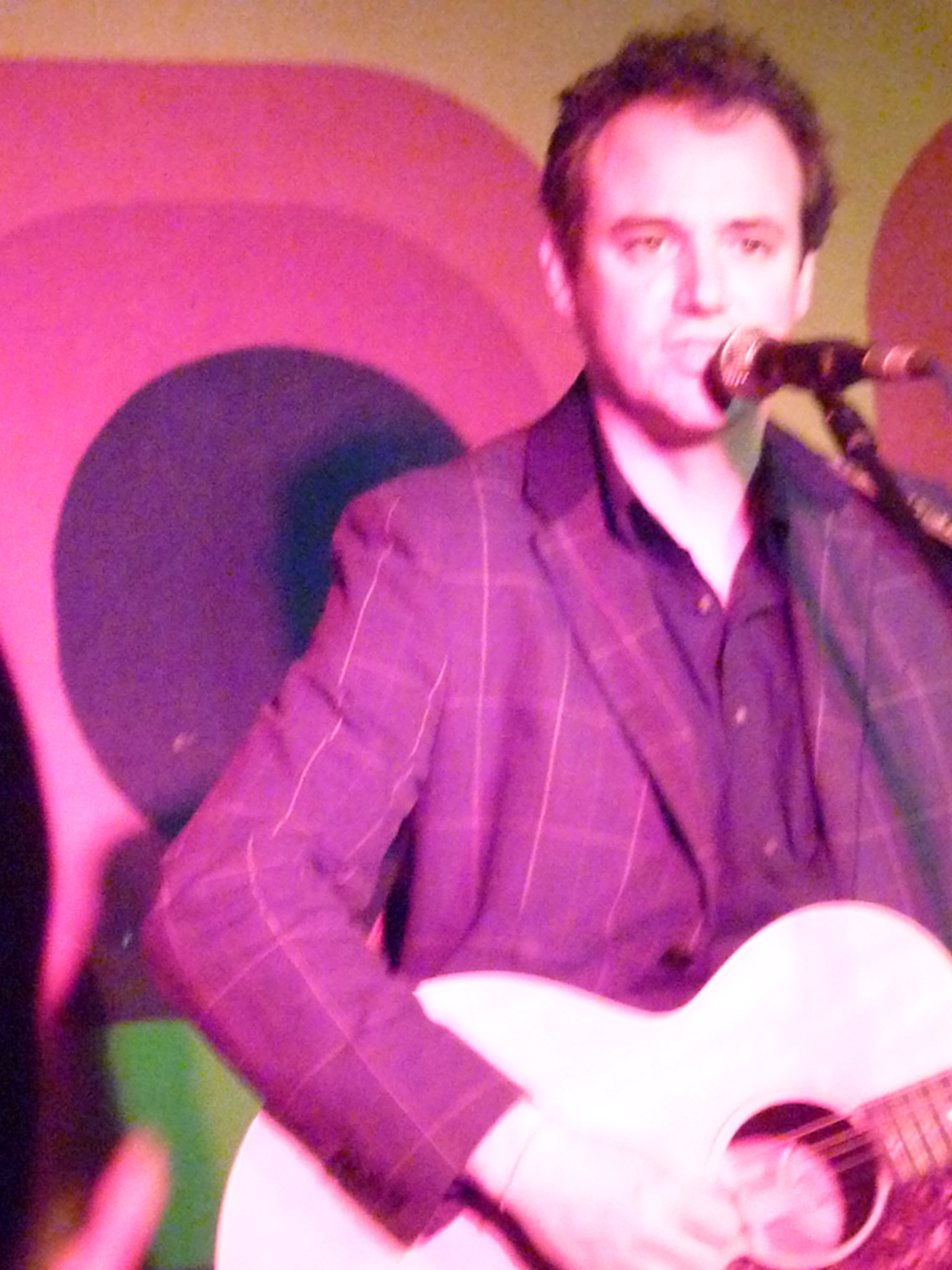
Pierre de Gaillande at Cafe Kairo in Bern, Switzerland.

Pierre de Gaillande is a French-born American singer, guitarist and composer. In the early 1990s, de Gaillande played trumpet in San Diego hardcore band Creedle, bass in New York power pop bands The Morning Glories and southern California indie band Film Star, as well as touring and recording with Atlantic recording artist C. Gibbs. He founded the band Melomane in 1998 as guitarist and lead singer. Melomane made three full-length studio albums and toured extensively in Europe.

De Gaillande founded the band Sea Foxx in 2003, which featured former Skeleton Key drummer Stephen Calhoon. De Gaillande was one of two founding members of the rock band The Snow, along with singer/pianist Hilary Downes.

In 2010, he released the album Bad Reputation: Pierre de Gaillande Sings Georges Brassens, in which he covered songs by French songwriter and poet Georges Brassens and translated the lyrics from French to English. De Gaillande says he first became interested in Brassens' music as a child, when his father played it very loudly in their home. A second album of Georges Brassens in English entitled Bad Reputation Volume 2 was released in 2014, and Volume 3 was released in 2023.

In 2018, de Gaillande and guitarist Gerald Menke formed Body Kite, a fully improvised, krautrock inspired band which performs live improvised sets accompanying films and abstract visuals. Body Kite features a rotating roster of musicians from the Hudson Valley and New York City.

In 2019, de Gaillande released an album of French versions of American punk and indie songs entitled franglais under the moniker Bad Reputation.

On April 4, 2025, de Gaillande released Working Batterie Volume 1, a collaboration with bassist Mike Watt, which is an album of songs created by compositions all begun by different drummers. Musicians involved in this project include Georgia Hubley, Nels Cline, Robert Walter, Kenny Wollesen, Stephen Ulrich, Dion Thurman, Devon Goldberg, Stephen Calhoon, Dan Menke, Gerald Menke, Brad Hubbard, Quentin Jennings, and C. Gibbs, among others.

== Film and Dance Composition ==
In 2004, de Gaillande collaborated with Gary Greenblatt to compose and perform a live score for Supernatural Return to Love, a dance piece by Uruguayan choreographer luciana achugar. In 2006, de Gaillande composed the score for feature documentary Dr. Bronner's Magic Soapbox, directed by Sara Lamm. In 2007 he scored the short film The Perfect Dress, directed by Rose Viggiano.

== Critical reception ==
Robert Christgau gave Bad Reputation an A− grade. In his review, he wrote that "Brassens was the rare music-second guy whose verbal blueprints laid out melodies that stand up on their own, and de Gaillande's diligence about following their syllabic patterns preserves tunes that will snake through your head days later." Scott Branson of PopMatters gave the album a 7 out of 10 rating, and described the album as "a great homage" but also said that "something of the joviality of Brassens is lost in de Gaillande’s renditions." Chris Nickson of AllMusic gave the album a rating of 4 out of 5 stars, and described the album as "all delightfully cynical and world-weary, with plenty of wit."

== Discography ==
Year	Title	Artist	Label	Credits
1994	Silent Weapons for Quiet Wars	Creedle	Cargo Music/ Headhunter Records	Trumpet
1996	When the Wind Blows	Creedle	Cargo Music/ Headhunter Records	Trumpet, vocals, guitar
1996	Tranquil Eyes	Film Star	Super Cottonmouth	Bass
1997	Let the Body Hang	Morning Glories	Cargo Music/ Headhunter Records	Bass, vocals, trumpet
1998	Sincerity's Ground	C. Gibbs Review	Cargo Music/ Headhunter Records	Bass, vocals, trumpet
1999	29 Over me	C. Gibbs Group	Atlantic Records	Guitar, bass
2000	Resolvo	Melomane	Organizer / XXS / Vermillion Music	Guitar, vocals, trumpet
2002	Solresol	Melomane	XXS / Vermillion Music	Guitar, vocals
2004	Dead in the Water	Sea Foxx	Vermillion Music	Guitar, vocals
2005	Glaciers	Melomane	Soyuz / Vermillion Music	Guitar, vocals
2006	Look Out!	Melomane	Vermillion Music	Guitar, vocals
2008	True Dirt	The Snow	Vermillion Music	Guitar, vocals
2010	I Die Every Night	The Snow	Vermillion Music	Guitar, vocals
2011	Bad Reputation Volume 1	Pierre de Gaillande	Barbes Records	Guitar, vocals, producer
2012	Disaster Is Your Mistress	The Snow	Vermillion Music	Guitar, vocals
2014	Bad Reputation Volume 2	Pierrede Gaillande	Vermillion Music	Guitar, vocals, producer
2017	Stay Calm	Open Kimono	Vermillion Music	Guitar, vocals, bass, drums, keyboards, percussion, trumpet, producer
2019	franglais	Bad Reputation	Vermillion Music	Guitar, vocals, bass, drums, keyboards, percussion, trumpet, producer
2023	Bad Reputation Volume 3	Pierre de Gaillande	Vermillion Music	Guitar, vocals, trumpet, producer
2025	Working Batterie Volume 1	Piere de Gaillande / Mike Watt	Clearly Records	Producer, guitar, vocals, trumpet, taishogoto, keyboards, percussion, loops and programming
