= Thingy (band) =

American indie rock band

- Years active: 1995–2000
- Spinoff of: Heavy Vegetable
- Members: Rob Crow; Brent Asbury; Kenseth Thibideau
- Past members: Elea Tenuta; Mario Rubalcaba; Jason Soares

Thingy is an American indie rock band formed after the dissolution of Heavy Vegetable in 1995, by its members Rob Crow and Eléa Tenuta.

Crow, Tenuta, and bassist Jason Soares released a seven-song EP, Staring Contest, in 1996 on the old Heavy Vegetable label Headhunter/Cargo.

They were joined by drummer Mario Rubalcaba in 1997, with whom they released the album, Songs About Angels, Evil, and Running Around on Fire. The same lineup released To the Innocent in 2000, but Rubalcaba and Soares left the quartet and were replaced by Brent Asbury and Kenseth Thibideau, respectively.

In 2018, Rob Crow released a new Thingy album entitled Morbid Curiosity, as part of his Artist in Residence project with label Joyful Noise.

Elea Tenuta died on January 9, 2021, at age 48, following an illness with breast cancer.

== Discography ==
=== Albums ===
- Songs About Angels, Evil, and Running Around on Fire (1997)
- To the Innocent (2000)
- Morbid Curiosity (2018)

=== EPs ===
- Staring Contest (1996)
