= KSDS =

Jazz music public radio station in San Diego

Coordinates: 32.805°N 117.170°W

- San Diego, California; United States
- Broadcast area: San Diego, California
- Frequency: 88.3 MHz (HD Radio)
- Branding: "Jazz FM 88.3"

Programming
- Language: English
- Format: Jazz
- Subchannels: HD2: SDS RADIO ("Student Designed Sound")

Ownership
- Owner: San Diego City College

History
- First air date: 1951

Technical information
- Licensing authority: FCC
- Facility ID: 58818
- Class: B1
- ERP: 22,000 watts vertical only
- HAAT: 75 meters (246 ft)

Links
- Public license information: Public file; LMS
- Webcast: Listen Live
- Website: jazz88.org

KSDS (88.3 FM, "Jazz FM 88.3") is a full-time mainstream/traditional Jazz radio station, licensed to the San Diego Community College District, broadcasting 24 hours a day from inside room numbers 114 and 115 on the first floor of the L Building within Curran Plaza on the campus of San Diego City College on 1313 Park Boulevard. The station is owned as a broadcast service by City College, although their transmitter and antenna are located atop the Student Services Center and Classrooms building (Building I-400) on the campus of its partner college, Mesa College, located north of City College, on 6959 Beagle Street in Kearny Mesa.

KSDS, founded in 1951, began programming jazz in 1973 and in 1985 became San Diego's only full-time jazz and blues station. KSDS is licensed by the FCC as a non-commercial, non-profit educational radio station and, for many years, operated with 3,000 watts at 88.3 MHz FM. In 2007, KSDS was granted a Construction Permit by the Federal Communications Commission allowing the station to increase its power to 22,000 watts, greatly improving the signal coverage area. They also feature a live stream and a playlist archive at their website.

They play music from artists like John Coltrane, Miles Davis, Dizzy Gillespie, Duke Ellington, Ella Fitzgerald, and Jelly Roll Morton to Rob McConnell, Bobby Watson, Herbie Hancock, and Wynton Marsalis.

KSDS/Jazz88 features specialty programs that concentrate on various subgenres of the music, such as Dixieland, Latin jazz, swing, big band, free jazz, world music, vocalists, all-female artists, and exclusively guitar music.

KSDS has two HD Radio channels. KSDS-HD1 simulcasts the analog stereo channel. KSDS-HD2 carries "Student Designed Sound", with both spoken word and music programs produced by students in City College's broadcasting program.

== See also ==
- List of jazz radio stations in the United States
