= Phil Esbenshade =

American lawyer

Phil Esbenshade, also known as Phil E., was born in Philadelphia, Pennsylvania. He is a well known professional skateboarder from the late 1980s. Five pro model skateboard decks bearing his name and 'E' initial were made by Skull Skates. Also on the Skull Skates team at the time were Duane Peters, Dave Hackett, and Steve Olson. He retired in the 1990s and became a Prosecutor and College Professor.

Esbenshade also played bass guitar and sang in the post-punk rock band Custom Floor with Miki Vuckovich, Garry Davis, and then later, Atom Willard (longtime drummer for Rocket From The Crypt, The Offspring, Social Distortion, Against Me! and Alkaline Trio.) Goldenrod Records released their debut ep while Phil was in the band.

Phil E. appeared in Transworld Skateboarding magazine, Thrasher Magazine, Freestylin', Homeboy Magazine, Warp Magazine, Skateboard!(UK), Poweredge Magazine, and Concrete Wave Magazine numerous times between 1987-1992. Phil's sponsors included Skull Skates, Gullwing Trucks, Santa Cruz Speed Wheels (OJ Wheels), Venture Trucks, Smallroom, Zorlac Skateboards, and G&S Skateboards. He was also featured in the skate videos "Skateboarding Inside Out", G&S Team Video, and Quiksilver's "Mondo Xtreme Experiment."

Photos of Phil Esbenshade appear in the photography book, "Rat a Tat Tat Birds" by Jeff Winterberg and Skateboarding Historian and author Jocko Weyland wrote about him in the book, "The Answer is Never: A Skateboarder's History of the World."

Esbenshade is an alumnus of the University of La Verne, earning a Juris Doctor Degree in 2003, and graduated from San Diego Miramar College.
