= Knapsack (band) =

American rock band

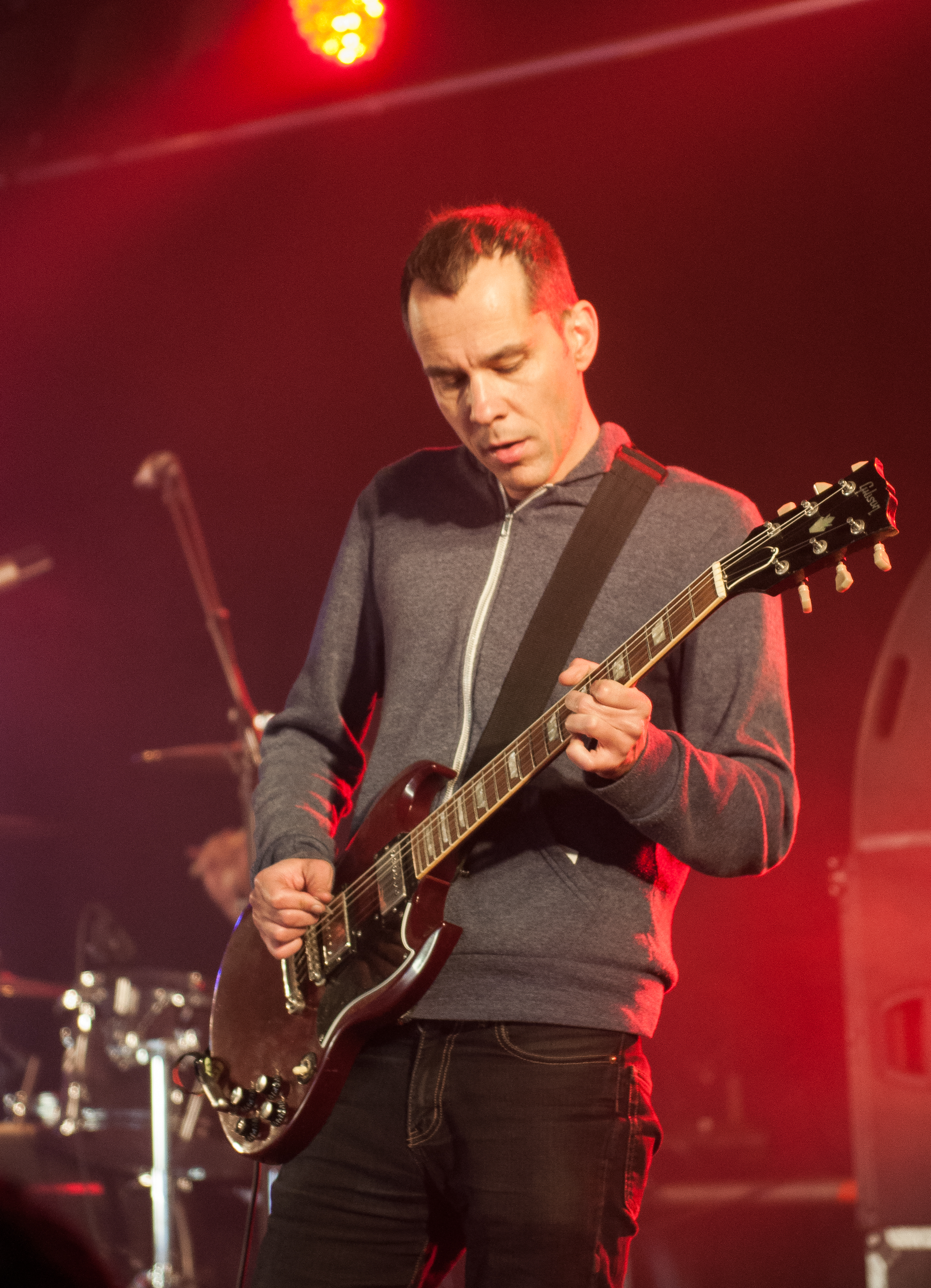
- Knapsack performing in 2015

Background information
- Origin: Davis, California, United States
- Genres: Emo; indie rock; pop-punk
- Years active: 1993–2000, 2013–present
- Labels: Alias, Goldenrod, Arctic Rodeo Recordings, Spartan
- Spinoffs: The Jealous Sound
- Members: Blair Shehan; Colby Mancasola; Sergie Loobkoff; Edward Breckenridge
- Past members: Jason Bokros; Rod Meyer

Knapsack is an American rock band formed in 1993 by Blair Shehan (vocals/guitar) and Colby Mancasola (drums). Shehan and Mancasola were two high school friends studying at the University of California, Davis. Guitarist Jason Bokros and bass guitarist Rod Meyer completed the line-up.

== History ==
Blair Shehan grew up a fan of hardcore punk bands such as Minor Threat, 7 Seconds, Gorilla Biscuits, Youth of Today, and Uniform Choice. While studying at the University of California, Davis, Shehan formed Knapsack with fellow UC Davis student and childhood friend Colby Mancasola on drums. Shehan's initial inspiration in starting the band was to combine the sound of bands like Dinosaur Jr., Superchunk, Pavement, Guided by Voices with the energy of hardcore.

In 1994, the band recorded a single for the independent label Goldenrod Records and signed with Alias Records later that year. Their first album, Silver Sweepstakes, was released in 1995. They then toured extensively and played with such bands as Sunny Day Real Estate, Treepeople, Pavement, and Jawbox.

Bokros left the group before the release of their second album, Day Three of My New Life, in 1997. Rod Meyer left the group after this release and was replaced by Sergie Loobkoff of Samiam. Their third album, This Conversation is Ending Starting Right Now, was released in 1998. After a tour with support act At the Drive-In, Knapsack broke up. Shehan went on to form The Jealous Sound in 2000.

Shehan, Colby, and Loobkoff reformed Knapsack in 2013, joined by Thrice bassist Eddie Breckenridge. The band played several shows, including a stop at the Fest, in Gainesville, Florida, making this their first-ever Florida appearance. However, according to Blair Shehan, and Groezrock festival in Belgium in 2015, Knapsack has no plans to release new music.

Knapsack reunited again in 2015 to perform as an opening act for Coheed and Cambria on the tour for their album The Color Before the Sun in Seattle, Washington, and Portland, Oregon.

== Discography ==
Albums

- Silver Sweepstakes (1995)
- Day Three of My New Life (1997)
- This Conversation Is Ending Starting Right Now (1998)

Singles

- "Trainwrecker" (1994)
- "True To Form" (1995)
- "Dropkick" w/ Stuntman (1997)

Compilations

- Superwinners Summer Rock Academy (1996)
- Don't Forget to Breathe (1996)

Music videos

- "Cellophane" (1995)
- "Effortless" (1995)
- Katherine The Grateful" (2024)
