= The Snow (band) =

American rock band

The Snow are a New York rock band formed by Melomane and Bad Reputation frontmen Pierre de Gaillande and Hilary Downes in 2006. Along with guitarist/singer/songwriter de Gaillande and pianist/keyboardist/singer/songwriter Downes are David Spinley - clarinet, saxophone (Morricone Youth); Jeffrey Schaeffer - drums, Christian Bongers - bass (Falcon, Botanica). Their music incorporates elements of indie rock, art-rock, chamber pop, French chanson, torch songs, classical music and jazz. Their lyrics are often humorous, utilizing double meanings, irony and metaphor.

== Work ==
The Snow's first album True Dirt (Vermillion Records, 2008) includes covers of songs by M. Ward (Poor Boy, Minor Key) and Bruce Springsteen (I'm on Fire). The originals range from whimsical, (the rhythmically complex Thirteen Arms Entwined, about a love affair between an octopus and a starfish), to socially critical (Russians, a snidely humorous look at the effects of capitalism on the former Soviet bloc).

Their latest album, I Die Every Night, (Vermillion Records, 2010), is more lushly orchestrated; half of its compositions are by Downes, who, like de Gaillande, utilizes numerous literary devices in her lyrics and typically favors lushly moody sonics. The songs range from the latest in de Gaillande's ongoing "disaster song cycle" about possible apocalypses (Silent Parade), to ominous torch songs by Downes (Albatross, and Undertow), to soul music (Fool's Gold) and humorous chanson (Reptile).
