= Goblin Cock =

American heavy metal band

- Origin: San Diego, California, U.S.
- Genres: Stoner metal; stoner rock; doom metal
- Years active: 2005–present
- Labels: Robcore Records; Absolutely Kosher; Joyful Noise Recordings
- Members: Rob Crow; Nick Reinhart; Tony Gidlund; Tyler Lindgren
- Past members: Brent Asbury; Kenseth Thibideau; Kasey Boekholdt; Brandon Relf; Nate Davis

Goblin Cock is an American stoner metal band from San Diego, California, United States, started by Rob Crow of the band Pinback. Musically, they play a form of doom metal/drone metal with rather unusual lyrical subjects, including pop culture songs about the films Godzilla's Revenge, Billy Jack, and the Snuffleupagus from the TV show Sesame Street. All members of the band have taken on stage names. The band is currently signed to Joyful Noise Recordings and has released two albums on the Absolutely Kosher record label. They went on tour for the first time in 2006 and played at the 20th annual South by Southwest Music Festival in Austin, TX. They also performed on September 15, 2005, at the College Music Journal's annual music festival.

Their first album, Bagged and Boarded, was nominated for a 2006 PLUG award for Metal Album of the Year. Their music video for the track "Stumped" directed by Matt Hoyt was also nominated for music Music Video of the Year at the 2006 PLUG Independent Music Awards as well. The album cover is a literal depiction of the group's name, which is considered a double entendre. The lyrics in the liner notes are written in runes.

== Members ==
- Lord Phallus (Rob Crow) - Guitar and Vocals
- Lick Myheart - Guitar
- Tinnitus Island - Bass guitar
- Mylar Grinninstein - Drums

== Discography ==
- Bagged and Boarded (2005 Absolutely Kosher Records)
- Come with Me If You Want to Live! (2008 Robcore Records)
- Necronomidonkeykongimicon (2016 Joyful Noise Recordings)
- Roses on the Piano (2018 Joyful Noise Recordings)
- Traumanaut (2026 Joyful Noise Recordings)
