= No Knife =

Band from San Diego, California

- Left to right: Mitch Wilson, Brian Desjean, Chris Prescott, Ryan Ferguson

Background information
- Origin: San Diego, California, U.S.
- Genres: Experimental rock, indie rock, emo
- Years active: 1993–2003; 2009; 2014–2015; 2019; 2024
- Labels: Goldenrod; Timebomb; Better Looking
- Past members: Mitch Wilson; Brian Desjean; Aaron Mancini; Ike Zaremba; Ryan Ferguson; Chris Prescott
- Website: http://www.noknife.net/

No Knife was a band from San Diego, California. They played an innovative form of rock that combined aspects of post-punk, post-hardcore, indie rock, and many other genres, influenced by a wide variety of acts, including Pixies, the Cure, Erik Satie, Steel Pulse, and Édith Piaf. No Knife once won the San Diego Music Award for "Best Punk Rock Band," and are cited as an influence by Thrice.

== History ==
The band's original lineup was Mitch Wilson (vocals/guitar), Brian Desjean (bass), Aaron Mancini (guitar), and Ike Zaremba (drums/vocals). Ryan Ferguson replaced Mancini on guitar after the release of 1996's Drunk on the Moon full-length. Early on, the band's biggest influences were Pitchfork, Pixies, and the Cure.

The followup to Drunk on the Moon, Hit Man Dreams was released in 1997. Chris Prescott was enlisted to play drums. Their final two albums, Fire in the City of Automatons were released in 1999 and 2002 respectively. After a tour with Cursive, the members went their separate ways without officially breaking up.

No Knife frequently toured with Jimmy Eat World. After hinting on their website in March 2008 that they might reunite in late 2008 or early 2009, the band was announced as the opening act for three west coast dates on Jimmy Eat World's "Clarity x 10" tour. No Knife played their final show Thursday, June 18, 2009, at the Belly Up Tavern in Solana Beach, California.

The band reunited to play shows in 2014, 2015, 2019, and 2024 mostly at The Casbah in San Diego.

Mitch Wilson currently sings and plays guitar and keyboards in Lunar Maps who released their self-titled debut album on June 15, 2011. Brian Desjean was playing bass for Get Your Death On!, a San Diego rock trio which formed in late 2005. He went on to play bass and drums with Wilson in Lunar Maps, and currently plays bass in Mistress 77. Ryan Ferguson is now a solo artist who has released an EP, Three Four, and a full-length album, Only Trying to Help. He has done some touring, including opening for the San Diego rock band, Switchfoot. Chris Prescott joined the live band for Pinback in late September, 2005, playing guitar, keyboard and singing backing vocals. then went on his first full tour with them as their drummer in 2006, and went on to record with them for Autumn of the Seraphs which was released in September 2007. He also is playing guitar/vocals for The Jade Shader which formed in 2004.

== Legacy ==
Fellow Californian band Thrice has cited No Knife as an influence, particularly on their 2005 album Vheissu. Thrice bassist Eddie Breckenridge has credited No Knife for "[changing] my musical path" and praised them for their "moving" melodies and mix of "melodic and discordant-weaving instrumental melodies [which] provide a depth and push/pull that many musicians can't pull off without sounding just noisy."

== Band members ==
- Mitch Wilson – guitar, vocals (1993–2003)
- Brian Desjean – bass (1993–2003)
- Ryan Ferguson – guitar, vocals (1996–2003)
- Chris Prescott – drums (1997–2003)
- Ike Zaremba – drums, vocals (1993–1997)
- Aaron Mancini – guitar (1993–1996)

== Discography ==
- Drunk on the Moon (1995)
- Hit Man Dreams (1997)
- Fire in the City of Automatons (1999)
- Riot for Romance (2002)
