= AMiniature =

American band

aMiniature was a band that was formed in the 1980s in San Diego by first generation Korean-American John Lee. By 1990 Lee had established the name aMiniature. The band's name was inspired by a poster hanging in the office of Lee's father that showed miniature bulbs. The "A" in the title is not pronounced, but was added to distinguish the group's name from a jazz ensemble with the same name.

Over its lifetime the band went through many lineup changes, with Lee and Colin Watson remaining as consistent members. The group disbanded in 1997.

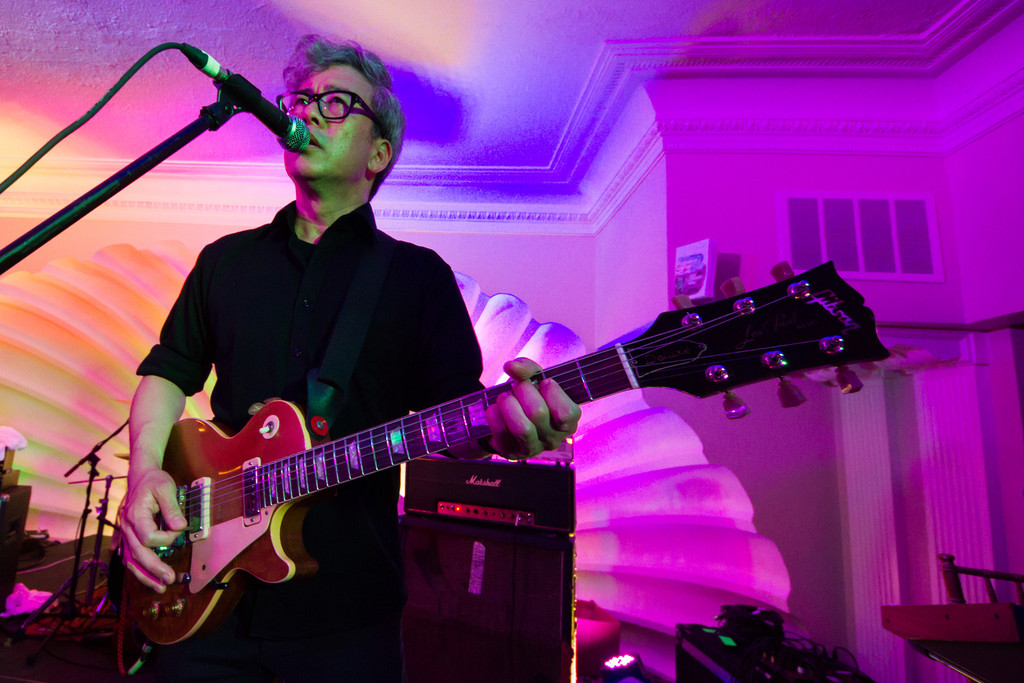
Guitarist/Singer-Songwriter John Lee

== Post-breakup ==
John Lee is now involved with a South Korea-based band called The Air Below. Colin Watson is currently playing bass with San Diego's own The Nephews. Currently called The Nephews and a Niece.

== Members ==
- John Lee (guitar, vocals, 1990–1997)
- Colin Watson (bass)
- Kevin Wells (guitar)
- Mark Monteith (guitar)
- Devon Goldberg (guitar)
- Christian Hoffman (drums)
- Mark Trombino (drums)
- Dave West (drums)
- Dickey Willoughby (bass)
- Bill Dyke (drums), 1990–1991
- Josh Augustin (drums)
- Dave Hepler (drums)

== Discography ==
- Plexiwatt (1992, Scheming Intelligensia, 1994 Restless Records))
- Depth 5 Rate 6 (1994, Restless Records)
- Murk Time Cruiser (1995, Restless Records)

=== Singles/Compilations ===
- "aMiniature / Drip Tank – Split" (Topsy, 1992)
- "Musica Del Diablo: Live From The Casbah" (Cargo Music, 1993)
- "You Got Lucky: A Tribute to Tom Petty" (Volcano 3, 1994)
- "Ear of the Dragon" (Fortune 5, 1995)
