= Murk Time Cruiser =

Studio album by aMiniature
- Released: 1995
- Genre: Indie punk
- Label: Restless
- Producer: John Lee, Mark Trombino

AMiniature chronology
Depth 5 Rate 6 (1994)	Murk Time Cruiser (1995)

Murk Time Cruiser is the second album by the American band aMiniature. It was released in 1995. The band promoted the album by touring with Seam, Versus, and Venus Cures All, bands, like aMiniature, that included Asian-American members.

== Production ==
The band's equipment was stolen prior to the recording sessions; a sheriff in El Cajon, California, was able to help aMiniature recover some of it. Mark Monteith joined on second guitar. Drive Like Jehu's Mark Trombino played drums on the album. Murk Time Cruiser was produced by John Lee and Trombino.

== Critical reception ==
Professional ratings
Review scores
Source	Rating
MusicHound Rock: The Essential Album Guide	5/5 stars
The San Diego Union-Tribune	3/4 stars

Trouser Press noted that frontman John Lee "continues to explore unusual guitar textures that eschew simple effects like feedback and distortion pedals for unusual fingerings and unexpected chord changes ... But no matter how ambitious the music, aMiniature remains a punk-rock band at heart." The Chicago Reader thought that "Lee frantically spits out words, presenting the band’s inherent tunefulness in choppy, tension-creating fragments." The Arizona Daily Star called the songs a melding of "avant-garde, punk and pop music," writing that the album is marked by "crashing passion and high velocity."

The Washington Post wrote: "Prickly and jumpy, aMiniature's Murk Time Cruiser reinvigorates the strategies of early '80s punk-funk." The Orange County Register called the songs "brilliant music," writing that "what makes aMiniature ... so special is the way the group layers various guitar riffs and melodies atop a usually fast and driving rhythm." The San Diego Union-Tribune deemed it "ultimately a bastardized blend of the hyperkinetic soundtracks of sci-fi video games and the (relatively) happy, boppin' punk rock of the '80s."

== Track listing ==
No.	Title	Length
1.	"He, the Bad Feeler"
2.	"Peddler's Talk"
3.	"Bored Spy"
4.	"Maximum Accident"
5.	"Secret Enemy"
6.	"The Prizefighters"
7.	"Signer's Strut"
8.	"Murk Time Cruiser"
9.	"Flux Is Flux"
10.	"Long Live Soul Miner"
