= Custom Floor =

US musical group

- Origin: San Diego, California, United States
- Genres: Indie rock, Post Punk
- Years active: 1991–Present
- Label: Analog Sound Recordings
- Spinoffs: Carpet Floor
- Members: Garry Davis; Matt Crane
- Past members: Phil Esbenshade; Chris Squire; Adam Willard; Miki Vuckovich; Tod Swank; Brent Fellows
- Website: Bandcamp

Custom Floor is an American underground indie rock band that was formed in 1991 in San Diego, California by Garry Davis (Guitar and vocals), Phil Esbenshade (Bass and Vocals). and Miki Vuckovich (Drums). Although Garry and Phil were former pro skateboarders, Custom Floor was never a skate rock band, instead displaying a heavy indie rock and post punk influence. They've described their music as "a large dose of guitar, bass and drums-based rock all big banged out into a wide array of minor notes, ringing octaves, heavy distortion, hovering harmonics, cymbal crashes, drum splashes and big-britches bass throb."

== History ==
Custom Floors first seven-inch record was released by Goldenrod Records in late 1991, and the band started playing frequent live shows throughout Southern California in 1992-'93. The first Custom Floor LP, Clear Day, was released in December 1993 on the Analog Sound Recordings label, and was supported with a full U.S. tour in Summer 1994—the second half of which was spent opening for fellow San Diegans Drive Like Jehu.

After the original Custom Floor line-up fizzled out in late 1992, numerous other San Diego musicians enjoyed brief stints in the band with leader Garry Davis in the mid-to-late '90s, including Tod Swank (bass), Brent Fellows (bass), Adam Willard of Rocket From The Crypt (drums), Michelle Slater (bass), Chris Squire (bass), Rafter Roberts (drums) and Matt Crane (drums). Garry released an experimental Custom Floor seven-inch called The Handsome Young Airforce Lieutenant with Adam Willard in 1995, then teamed up with Matt Crane and Chris Squire to record the band's second full-length CD, From a Body, in 1997.

A hiatus of several years then ensued, after which Garry and Matt recorded the band's third full-length, A Distant Dull, in 2005. Custom Floor still exists today as a studio recording entity only, having played their last live show in 2000. Garry and Matt also occasionally play free improvisation and spontaneous rock music with various side musicians under the offshoot name Carpet Floor, who released four CDs—Majestic, Hovering Pillows, Mass Ejection and Blow Out—on August 2, 2007. In 2014, Custom Floor briefly appeared in the film It's Gonna Blow, a documentary about San Diego's underground music scene of the 1990s. In 2024, Custom Floor released its fourth full-length album, You Haunt Me with guest drummer Brendan K. filling in for Matt Crane.

== Discography ==
Homeless / UPS Driver / In My House 7" (1991)
Clear Day LP (1993)
The Handsome Young Air Force Lieutenant 7" (1995)
From a Body CD (1997)
A Distant Dull CD (2005)
You Haunt Me LP (2024)

Compilations Various Artists—Ask for Disorder CD (1993) "In the Glare of the Sun"
Various Artists—Flushing the Vault 7" (1999) "My Knot and Knee"
