= Silver Sweepstakes =

Studio album by Knapsack
- Released: April 1995
- Genre: Emo, indie rock
- Length: 39:55
- Label: Alias Records

Knapsack chronology
Silver Sweepstakes (1995)	Day Three of My New Life (1997)

Professional ratings
Review scores
Source	Rating
AllMusic	2.5/5 stars
MusicHound Rock: The Essential Album Guide	3/5 stars

Silver Sweepstakes is the first full-length album by the indie rock/emo band Knapsack. It was released in 1995 by Alias Records.

== Critical reception ==
Trouser Press gave the album a poor review, writing that "habitual hastiness, the guitars’ unwavering sizzle-roar and singer Blair Shehan's unfortunate ability to bellow in eerie imitation of Perry Farrell leaves Knapsack pissing on the wrong tree." In a more positive review, SF Weekly wrote that "emotionally charged, infallible punk constructs coalesce with hard-edged melodies to create a sound that's as compelling as it is approachable."

In an article on "emo classics," Alternative Press wrote: "Knapsack’s debut is a spot-on example of the bridge between punk and emo. Most noteworthy for jamming the power chords while showing an oft desire to decelerate their pace, the underground grittiness shouldn’t mesh with their heart-throbbing vocals in theory, yet they do with no signs of conflict."

== Track listing ==
1. Cellophane - 3:31
2. Trainwrecker - 3:54
3. Effortless - 3:13
4. Fortunate and Holding - 3:50
5. Casanova - 2:43
6. Makeshift - 1:28
7. Centennial - 3:47
8. Symmetry - 3:16
9. True to Form - 2:24
10. Addressee - 5:54
11. Silver Sweepstakes - 5:55
