= Lucy's Fur Coat =

Californian rock band

- Origin: San Diego, California, United States
- Genres: Grunge; Alternative rock
- Years active: 1992–2000;
- Labels: Relativity Records; SRH Records; Goldenrod Records
- Past members: Charlie Ware; Tony Sanfilippo; Rob Brown; Mike Santos; Scott "Scoots" Bauer; Scott Clark
- Website: Lucy's Fur Coat

Lucy's Fur Coat was an American rock band that formed in 1992 in San Diego, California, United States, with rhythm guitarist and chief songwriter Mike Santos on lead vocals. Deciding they needed a more prominent front man, they added lead vocalist Charlie Ware within their first year. Other original band members included Tony Sanfilippo, guitar; Rob Brown, bass; and Scott "Scoots" Bauer, drums.

With the band's powerful rock sound and Ware's spastic dancing, the band became a huge local draw. The band signed to Relativity Records and released Jaundice in 1994. The band toured extensively throughout the United States and Canada in support of the record. The song "Treasure Hands" received extensive airplay, especially in Southern California.

Internal struggles within the band led to drummer Bauer leaving, replaced by Scott Clark. But the band members felt their record company never fully supported them, and friction between the band and its management with Relativity led to the band breaking up briefly, in order to get out of their contract. In 1998, the band reunited and recorded a new CD "How to Survive an Air Crash" on SRH Records. Santos left the band and Lucy's Fur Coat continued as a four-piece and soldiered on, mostly playing at local clubs. Though the band generated some major label interest, they failed to get signed and again the group broke up. Lucy's Fur Coat has reunited several times over the years for one-off shows, some of which have included Santos.

Ware and Sanfilippo formed the band Pumphouse with Petey X of Rocket from the Crypt. Santos and Brown joined Marc Balanky (Funeral March, The Palominos), Tom Perry (Deadbolt) and Joe Camacho (Malachi Crunch) to form the country band The Scramblers. Santos later formed the group The Coolest Band in America in 2004, which released CDs "Air Conditioned" and "Memo." Currently, Ware, Santos, Petey X, Morgan Smith (the Front) and Mark Maigaard (Louis XIV and Convoy) formed the band Midnight Rivals and are gigging in the San Diego area. Santos also fronts Bayside Bridge Club a retro first-wave group with Charlie Brownell (who also played with Rob Brown in The Chasers), Jeff Trag, D Segel, and Danno. In 2016, Santos joined Balanky, Perry and Mark Sgarbossa to form Sea Base, later adding Rob Brown as a member of the Armada. Rob also plays in San Clemente based spooky rock band The Grand Old Evils with Jon Morris of Dig (who Lucy's toured with back in the day).

== Discography ==
Albums

- Jaundice (Relativity, 1994)
- How to Survive an Air Crash (SRH, 1998)

Singles

- "Speed Queen" / "Friend" / "Insanity" (Red Eye Records, 1993)
- "Treasure Hands" / "Not My Fault" / "Falling Out" / "I Give Up" (Relativity, 1994)
- "Elementary" / "Sensor" / "Treasure Hands" (Relativity, 1994)
- "Sensor" (Relativity, 1994) - promo
- "Lucy" / "Watergun" (Goldenrod, 1994)
- "Aurora" / "Stealth" (Goldenrod, 1995)

Compilation album appearances

- Saint Doug: San Diego Local Music Soundtrack - "I Give Up" (91X, 1994)
- Lose Your Illusion 1 - "Shapely" (SRH Records, 1998)
