= Jaundice (album) =

Studio album by Lucy's Fur Coat
- Released: 1994
- Genre: Alternative rock
- Label: Relativity

Lucy's Fur Coat chronology
Jaundice (1994)	How to Survive an Air Crash (1998)

Jaundice is the debut album by the American band Lucy's Fur Coat, released in 1994. The band was part of the early 1990s San Diego music scene—one of many "next" regional scenes that drew the attention of the media and record labels, in the wake of the Seattle grunge explosion.

The band supported the album by opening for Dig on a North American tour. The album's first single was "Treasure Hands". Jaundice sold more than 60,000 copies in its first four years of release.

== Production ==
Most of the album's songs were written by the guitarist Mike Santos. College graduates, the band recorded Jaundice while working day jobs in the legal, medical, engineering, and financial professions. Lucy's Fur Coat rejected artistic pretensions, noting that a love of rock music was the primary impetus for album.

== Critical reception ==
Professional ratings
Review scores
Source	Rating
The Cincinnati Post	2.5/4 stars
Entertainment Weekly	B
Pittsburgh Post-Gazette	2.5/4 stars

Trouser Press called the album "a solid mix of hard rock and indie ethics," writing that guitarists "Sanfilippo and Santos deliver buoyant, driving riffs and infectious, hooky fills." Entertainment Weekly thought that the band's "energy level is several steps ahead of their songwriting, but the boys concoct some chunky riffs that carry attitude-heavy songs like 'Insanity'... The uncluttered, louder-is-better production is also a plus." The Hartford Courant compared the band to Pearl Jam, determining that the singer "growls, groans and moans like Eddie Vedder and the five-man band churns out the type of '70s riffs the so-called grunge bands like to use." The Pittsburgh Post-Gazette stated that, "with Clash-like clarity, this California quintet thrashes through songs in a way that forces you to pay attention."

The Washington Post called the songs "familiar, but frequently likable," writing that, "though the Coat might try to vary its formula a bit—many of these songs start as ballads only to turn into rockers—such surgingly pretty songs as 'Falling Out' and 'Super' could hardly be improved." The Record concluded that Lucy's Fur Coat "shows just how arbitrary the 'alternative' tag can be, by perfunctorily running through twelve songs that sound stale enough to be classic rock." The Philadelphia Inquirer declared that Jaundice "rocks with a brute force, and a surprisingly melodic ingenuity."

In a 2004 retrospective feature on grunge, Spin deemed Jaundice a "fake" grunge album "ripe for reconsideration."

== Track listing ==
No.	Title	Length
1.	"Treasure Hands"	3:02
2.	"Falling Out"	3:28
3.	"Super"	3:49
4.	"Still I Complain"	3:58
5.	"Easy"	5:05
6.	"Sensor"	3:42
7.	"Elementary"	4:21
8.	"Same"	4:35
9.	"Insanity"	4:37
10.	"Not My Fault"	1:29
11.	"Southern Cookin'"	5:20
12.	"747"	5:36

== Personnel ==
- Scott Bauer – drums
- Rob Brown – bass
- Tony Sanfilippo – guitar
- Mike Santos – guitar
- Charlie Ware – vocals
