= Hit Man Dreams =

Studio album by No Knife
- Released: July 15, 1997
- Recorded: February 1997
- Genre: Indie rock
- Length: 44:12
- Label: Time Bomb

No Knife chronology
Drunk on the Moon (1996)	Hit Man Dreams (1997)	Fire in the City of Automatons (1999)

Professional ratings
Review scores
Source	Rating
Allmusic	4/5 stars

Hit Man Dreams is the second full-length album by No Knife, and the first album after Ryan Ferguson joined the band. It was recorded in 1997 and released on Time Bomb Records.

== Track listing ==
1. Your Albatross - 4:13
2. Charades - 3:50
3. Hit Man Dreams - 5:17
4. Jackboots - 3:34
5. Testing the Model - 2:03
6. Median - 2:45
7. Rebuilding Jericho - 4:09
8. Bad Landing - 6:44
9. Roped In – Lock On - 3:31
10. Lex Hit Reset - 4:06
11. Sweep Away My Shadow - 3:59
