= Creedle =

American rock band

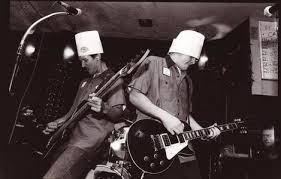

Background information
- Origin: San Diego, California, U.S.
- Genres: Art rock; punk jazz
- Years active: 1991–1998; 2007–
- Labels: Cargo; Headhunter
- Members: Devon E. Levins; Pieboy; Dr. Gein; Cochemea; Rob Crow; Gabriel Sundy
- Past members: Robert Walter; Scraps; Pete Skinbus; Rob de Molay; Pierre de Gaillande
- Website: creedle.com

Creedle is an American rock band based in San Diego, California. They are most known for their three full-length albums released on Cargo Music/Headhunter Records in the 1990s, along with numerous 7-inch singles. The band was primarily composed of Devon E. Levins a.k.a. Devon Goldberg (guitar/vocals), PieBoy a.k.a. Tim Blankenship (bass/vocals), Dr. Gein a.k.a. Dion Thurman (drums), Stretch a.k.a. Robert Walter (keyboards and samples) and Cheme a.k.a. Cochemea Gastelum (saxophone). Creedle was formed after the nearly simultaneous break ups of San Diego bands The Pull Toys, Daddy Long Legs, Holy Love Snakes and If Tomorrow.

Half Man Half Pie, Creedle's first album, was recorded and mixed by Donnell Cameron at Westbeach Recorders in Hollywood, California. The artwork was created by Fip Buchanan. The second album, Silent Weapons for Quiet Wars, was a concept album pertaining to freemasonry, the Knights Templar and related conspiracy theories which was also recorded and mixed at Westbeach Recorders but instead by Bill Jackson, who worked with Prince, Danny Elfman and Elvis Costello. The album features the Skinbus Horns, composed of Pete Kellers on alto saxophone and Pierre de Gaillande on trumpet. The final album entitled When The Wind Blows added alto saxophonist Cochemea Gastelum. The album was recorded and mixed by Mark Trombino at Big Fish Studios in Olivenhain, California and included the vocals of Rob Crow and Pierre de Gaillande on various tracks and liner notes by music writer David R. Stampone. All three albums were released on Cargo Music/Headhunter Records.

Members of the band continue to record and perform with The Greyboy Allstars, The DaoSon For, Morricone Youth, Pretendo, Fluf, Robert Walter's 20th Congress, Roger Waters, 16, Manual Scan and Sharon Jones & The Dap-Kings. Creedle, joined by Rob Crow on vocals, keyboards and samples, played a reunion show on December 30, 2007, at the Casbah in San Diego which is where the band played its first show in 1991. The band has since played sporadic shows in California and Nevada and commenced working on a new album in May 2010 tentatively entitled The San Diego Music Awards. Rob Crow and Gabriel Sundy have respectively replaced Robert Walter and Cochemea Gastelum on some live dates. On March 29, 2011, the band performed an album's worth of new material at the Casbah under the name "The San Diego Music Awards" to some controversy based on the similarity in name to the San Diego Music Awards local music awards show held annually in San Diego, California. In January 2014, Robert Walter played live with the band for the first time in nearly twenty years for the Casbah's 25th anniversary show. The band was featured as a subject in Bill Perrine's documentary "It's Gonna Blow!!! - San Diego's Music Underground 1986-1996".

== Musical style and influences ==
Creedle's musical style encompasses alternative rock, punk rock, progressive rock and jazz rock. The band's style has been classified as art rock and punk jazz.

== Discography ==
=== Albums ===
- Half Man Half Pie - Cargo Music/Headhunter Records 1992
- Silent Weapons for Quiet Wars - Cargo Music/Headhunter Records 1994
- When the Wind Blows - Cargo Music/Headhunter Records 1996

=== EPs ===
- Bad Radio - Cargo Music/Headhunter Records
- Trip 3 split 7-inch with Deadbolt "Bicycle Moto Cross" - Trademark Records
- It's Not Cool To Like Green Day Anymore - Rhetoric Records

=== Compilations ===
- 91X Mas "Wake Up Baby Jesus"
- Musica Del Diablo "Maiden (SD Version Live)" - Cargo Music/Headhunter Records/1993
- Saint Doug "Takin' Dick to the Bridge"
- IMS - I'm A Mess
- Kills Majors Dead "Otto the Tentmaker" - Cargo Music/Headhunter Records
- The Thing From Another World Vol. 4: Super Phonic Machine "La Chanson De L'Espion Detectif" - The Thing/THR 005 1997 Greece
- What A Wonderful Compilation! "Georgia X" - Wool Music/Wool 1 1996 France
- Audio-CD "Fisher Price" - Audio/Audio CD-29 Feb 1997 Greece
