= Tanner (band) =

American rock band

Tanner was a 1990s American rock band from San Diego, California, formed after the breakup of Fishwife. They recorded for Caroline Records and Headhunter Records.

== Critical reception ==
In an early live review, the Fort Worth Star-Telegram thought that Tanner "ravages too much from geeky-noise bands Pitchblende and Truman's Water - minus the diversity."

AllMusic, in a 4.5-star (out of 5) review, deemed Ill Gotten Gains "a grinding set of modern-day punk." Trouser Press called the debut "impressive," writing that "rather than write verse-chorus-verse punk, the trio piles riffs together — sort of a 'hey, this would sound great after that' style — and the almost effortless march through complex changeups is engaging, quirky and cool." Tucson Weekly wrote that "the band sticks to what it knows: straight ahead punk, with quick tempo shifts that don't attempt too much fanciness, and minus any trendy dissonant tangents." The San Diego Union-Tribune thought that "Tanner effectively ridicules suburban insularity, confusion and fear in 'Guard Dog', one of the best songs on the album."

== Band members ==
- Gar Wood - guitar, lead vocals
- Matt Ohlin - bass
- Chris Prescott - drums

== Discography ==
- Ill Gotten Gains - (Caroline Records, 1995)
- (Germo) Phobic - (Headhunter Records, 1997)
