= Fishwife (band) =

American punk rock band

- A Fishwife show from 1992 picturing Chris Prescott (on drums, far left), Ryan Foxe (with microphone, black shirt, and cap in front of drum set), Gar Wood (with guitar, left of drum set), and Matt Ohlin (with bass guitar, just visible in lower right corner).

Background information
- Origin: San Diego, California, U.S.
- Genres: Punk rock, math rock, post-hardcore
- Years active: 1990–1993
- Label: Cargo
- Past members: Ryan Foxe; Chris Prescott; Gar Wood; Matt Ohlin

Fishwife was an American punk rock band from San Diego, California, active from 1990 to 1993 and consisting of Ryan Foxe (vocals), Matt Ohlin (bass guitar), Gar Wood (guitar), and Chris Prescott (drums).

Fishwife broke up in 1993 when Foxe moved to New York City to attend college. Prescott, Ohlin and Wood subsequently formed the band Tanner, and Foxe later sang in the garage rock group The Let Downs.
