= Day Three of My New Life =

Studio album by Knapsack
- Released: February 25, 1997
- Genre: Emo; post-punk
- Length: 35:18
- Label: Alias/Poison City

Knapsack chronology
Silver Sweepstakes (1995)	Day Three of My New Life (1997)	This Conversation Is Ending Starting Right Now (1998)

Professional ratings
Review scores
Source	Rating
AllMusic	4.5/5 stars
MusicHound Rock: The Essential Album Guide	3/5 stars

Day Three of My New Life is the second full-length album by the rock band Knapsack. It was released on February 25, 1997, on Alias Records, and re-released in 2014 on Poison City Records.

== Critical reception ==
The A.V. Club called the album "the band’s crowning achievement." CMJ New Music Report called it "a noisy, post-punk bonfire." Vulture wrote that "[Knapsack's] songs were always a little too curiously shaped to break into the mainstream, but you can still hear the crossover potential in the sensitivity of their dynamics."

== Track listing ==
1. "Thursday Side Of The Street" - 2:48
2. "Courage Was Confused" - 3:51
3. "Decorate The Spine" - 2:39
4. "Diamond Mine" - 4:21
5. "Simple Favor" - 3:02
6. "Boxing Gloves" - 3:36
7. "Henry Hammers Harder" - 3:50
8. "Perfect" - 3:51
9. "Heart Carved Tree" - 4:15
10. "Steeper Than We Thought" - 3:05

== Personnel ==
- Cole Gerst – design
- Knapsack – producer
- Colby Mancasola – drums
- Stephen Marcussen – mastering
- Rod Meyer – bass guitar
- Blair Shehan – guitar, vocals
- Mark Trombino – producer, engineer, mixing
- Allen Yost – illustrations
