= San Diego Miramar College =

Community college in San Diego, California, US

Coordinates: 32°54′25.72″N 117°07′14.70″W

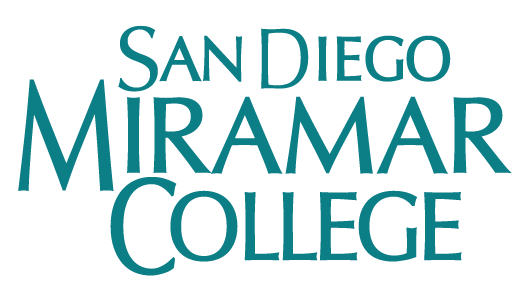
- Motto: To prepare students to succeed in a changing world within an environment that values excellence in learning, teaching, innovation and diversity.
- Type: Public community college
- Established: 1969; 57 years ago
- Parent institution: San Diego Community College District, California Community Colleges System
- President: P. Wesley Lundburg
- Faculty: 446
- Administrative staff: 285
- Undergraduates: 12,573 (2012)
- Location: San Diego, California, United States
- Campus: Suburban, 120 acres (49 ha)
- Colors: Teal Green, silver/gray
- Mascot: Jets
- Website: www.sdmiramar.edu

San Diego Miramar College (Miramar College or Miramar) is a public community college in San Diego, California. It is part of San Diego Community College District and the California Community Colleges system. The college is accredited by the Accrediting Commission for Community and Junior Colleges (ACCJC).

The college was established in 1969. It services 14,000 students annually and offers 70 associate degrees and 90 career technical education certificates. The college is home to the Southern California Biotechnology Center, Advanced Transportation and Energy Center and the San Diego Regional Public Safety Institute.

== Notable alumni ==
- Brian Awadis (FaZe Rug): YouTube personality
- Phil Esbenshade (Phil E.): Professional skateboarder/Musician/Attorney
- Jerry Sanders: San Diego Mayor
- Adam Pearce: Professional Wrestler
