= This Conversation Is Ending Starting Right Now =

Studio album by Knapsack
- Released: September 8, 1998
- Recorded: Hyde Street Studios, San Francisco, CA
- Genre: Indie rock, emo
- Length: 36:07
- Label: Alias; Poison City

Knapsack chronology
Day Three of My New Life (1997)	This Conversation Is Ending Starting Right Now (1998)

Professional ratings
Review scores
Source	Rating
AllMusic	4/5 stars
Punknews.org	4.5/5 stars

This Conversation Is Ending Starting Right Now is the third and final studio album by the indie rock/emo band Knapsack. It was released on September 8, 1998, on Alias Records, and re-released in 2014 by Poison City Records. The album title comes from lyrics for the song "Skip The Details."

== Critical reception ==
The Morning Call called the album "full of clever, hook-laden and emotional tunes." Spin, in an article about undeservedly obscure bands, wrote that This Conversation Is Ending Starting Right Now is "a minor classic of twentysomething despair." Lollipop Magazine praised Blair Shehan and Sergie Loobkoff's guitar interplay and knack for melodies, and ended their review by commenting that the songs "will not only have you swaying back and forth uncontrollably to the rhythms, they'll send you searching for your inner child." The A.V. Club thought that the album lacked the "desperate declarations" of Day Three of My New Life.

== Track listing ==
1. "Katherine the Grateful" - 3:17
2. "Change Is All the Rage" - 3:27
3. "Shape of the Fear" - 4:25
4. "Cold Enough to Break" - 3:20
5. "Skip the Details" - 2:53
6. "Arrows to the Action" - 3:28
7. "Cinema Stare" - 3:04
8. "Hummingbirds" - 4:42
9. "Balancing Act" - 3:40
10. "Please Shut Off the Lights" - 3:51
