= Ryan Ferguson (musician) =

Background information
- Origin: San Diego, California, U.S.
- Genres: Indie rock
- Years active: 2003–2007
- Labels: Jr Varsity Records; Better Looking Records

Ryan Ferguson (born c. 1975) is an indie rock guitarist and singer-songwriter, formerly of Southern California band No Knife. In 2004 he contributed the acoustic track "Wait for Me There" to the compilation album San Diego Is Burning. Ferguson's solo debut Three, Four was released in July 2005, winning a San Diego Music Award for "Best Pop Record" that year. Critic Chris Nixon cited it as one of the best releases of the year for San Diego musicians. The Sims 2 featured an interpretation of the album's lead track "Suddenly". He went on to tour with American rock band Switchfoot, and released a full-length album entitled Only Trying to Help in 2007.

Ferguson's influences include Jellyfish and Wire. Critic Kevin Bronson labelled Ferguson's style as "power pop", and Ferguson commented, "We're not ashamed of playing pop songs anymore."

== Discography ==
=== Albums ===
- Only Trying to Help (2007) Better Looking Records
- Three, Four EP (2005) Jr Varsity Records

=== Compilations ===
- "My Favorite Songwriters" (2004) Five One, Inc.
