= Goldenrod Records =

Goldenrod Records was a record label formed by Tod Swank in 1991 in San Diego, California to release the first 7" record by Custom Floor, a band consisting of skateboarders Garry Davis, Phil Esbenshade, and Miki Vuckovich. After the release of the Custom Floor record, Swank's other project, Foundation Skateboards, gained some financial momentum, and Goldenrod was put on hold. Swank's friend Mark Waters, an employee at Lou's Records at the time, and also a photographer and writer in the skateboarding world, was looking to start a record label and asked Swank for advice. A partnership was born and the "no rules for records" idea was spawned. Basically, this meant that if they liked a band, they'd put out a record if they could, without worrying about how many would sell. A long series of releases by primarily San Diego bands followed, and several noteworthy San Diego bands made their debut on Goldenrod Records: No Knife, Heavy Vegetable, Boilermaker, 100 Watt Halo, Chinchilla, The Crimson Curse, etc. Other notable bands who released records on Goldenrod include Three Mile Pilot, fluf, Supernova, Tina, Age 13, Big Drill Car, Hemlock, Lucy's Fur Coat, Fishwife, Deadbolt. Cars Get Crushed and more. Although technically the label still exists, the only release since 1998 was What Is Your? by Waters' band Contribution in 2004.

== See also ==
- List of record labels
