= Deadbolt (band) =

American rock band

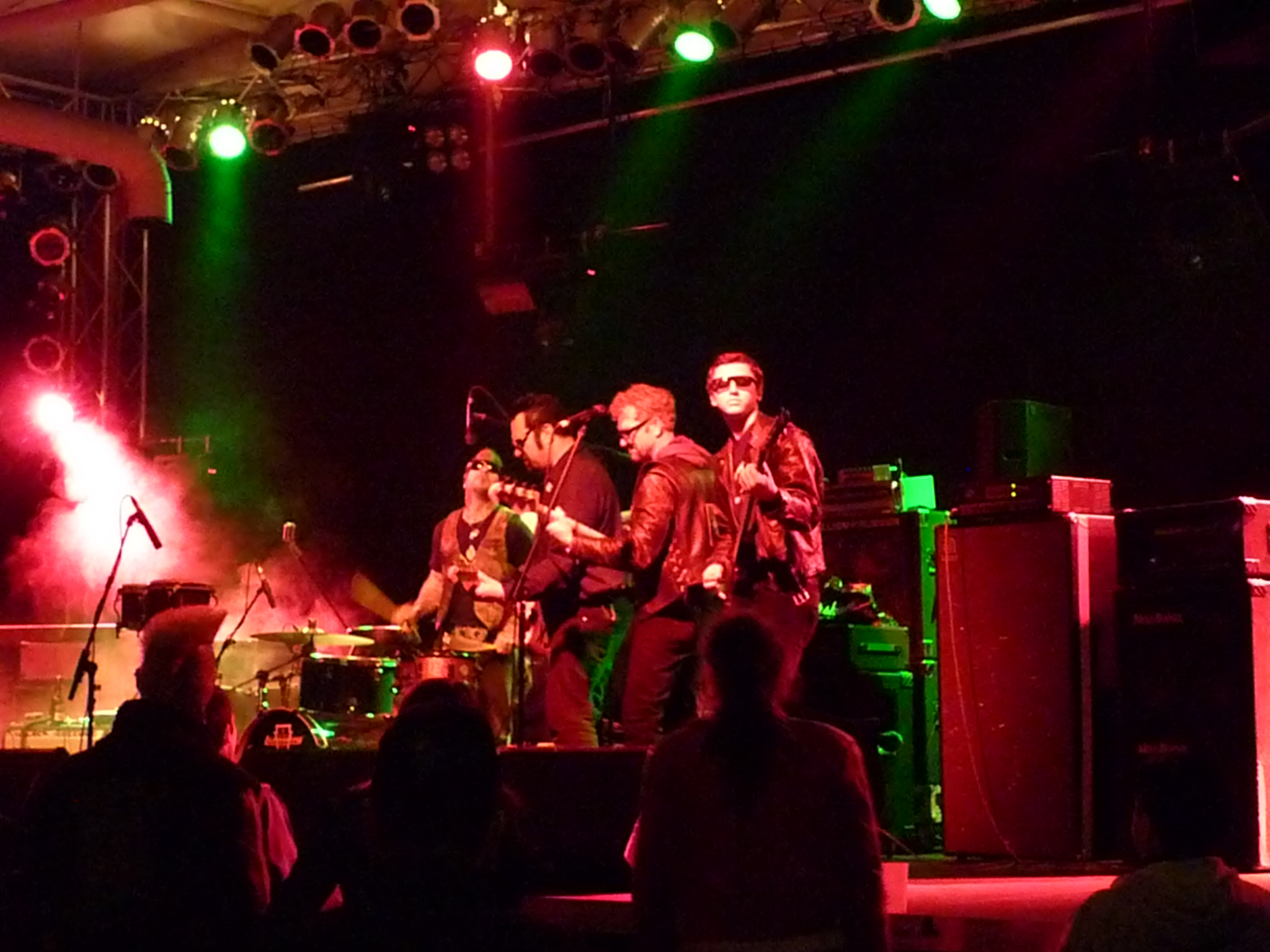
- Deadbolt performing live in Cologne, Germany

Background information
- Origin: San Diego, California, U.S.
- Genres: Psychobilly; surf rock
- Years active: 1988–present
- Labels: Cargo; Headhunter; Hairball 8
- Members: Harley Davidson; Gary "Third Degree" Burns; Tank Johnson
- Past members: Les Vegas; The Phantom; Badtime Charlie; Claymore Mines; The Coroner; Coffin Boy; Moose Cutter; R.A. McLean; The Voodellas

Deadbolt is an American rock band from San Diego, California. Fusing rockabilly and surf music with tongue-in-cheek horror-themed lyrics, Deadbolt has called itself the "scariest band in the world", classifying their musical style as "voodoobilly".

== History ==
The band originally formed in 1988 as a trio, featuring guitarist and vocalist Harley Davidson, bassist and vocalist Robert "RA" MacLean and drummer Les Vegas. Both Vegas and MacLean have since left the band. The other current members of the band are bassist Gary "3rd Degree" Burns (part of the band's "Wall Of Thunder") and drummer Tank Johnson. Tank Johnson died on January 11, 2015. Former members of the band include The PhanTom (bass and guitar), Claymore Mines (bass), The Coroner (bass), Coffin Boy (bass), Moose Cutter (bass), and Mark Davidson (Harley's brother) a.k.a. Lord Von Crappo who still occasionally plays with the band. Vocalist/guitarist Diana Death occasionally contributes.

Three members of the band were also in a short-lived offshoot group called Strangers 1800, which performed music from Spaghetti Western films and TV westerns and released one EP, When Men Were Men and the Sheep Were Scared and one split record with Deadbolt on Goldenrod Records.

== Musical style and influences ==
Bassist Gary Burns described the band's music as "voodoobilly—the darker side of the rockabilly family." The band's music fuses surf music and rockabilly with horror-themed lyrics. Vocalist Harley Davidson performs spoken vocals. Ian Trumbull, writing for AllMusic, compared the band's music to "the Ventures playing spooky surf music behind a dry, Dragnet style narrative". The band has called itself the "scariest band in the world" as part of its tongue-in-cheek humor. The band uses power tools during their live performances, showering their audiences with sparks.

== Discography and videography ==
Albums

- Creepy World (cassette only) – Mondo Records, 1992
- Shrunken Head – Cargo/Headhunter Records, 1993
- Tiki Man – Cargo/Headhunter Records 1994
- Tijuana Hit Squad – Cargo/Headhunter Records, 1996
- Zulu Death Mask – Cargo/Headhunter Records, 1998
- Voodoo Trucker – Cargo/Headhunter Records, 1999
- Hobo Babylon – Cargo/Headhunter Records, 2002
- Haight Street Hippie Massacre: The Best of Deadbolt (compilation) – Cargo/Headhunter Records, 2003
- I Should Have Killed You – Cargo/Headhunter Records, 2005
- Live at the Casbah – Re:Live, 2005
- Friday the 13th Massacre (Live) – Hod Rod Surf, 2009
- Voodoo Moonshiner – Voodoobilly Records, 2010
- Live In Berlin at The Wild At Heart November 21, 2009 (2 CD & 3 disc album) – Knockout Records (German Import), 2010
- Buy a Gun – Get a Free Guitar (CD & LP) – Deadbolt Records, 2011

Singles

- "Down in the Lab" – Smells Like Grease for Peace, Standard Recordings, 1992 (split with Rocket from the Crypt's "Cha Cha Cha")
- "E Frank" – Trip 3 – Trademark Records, 1993 (split with Creedle's "Bicycle Moto-Cross")
- "Cockeye" – Goldenrod Records, 1995 (split with Strangers 1800's "Rawhide")
- "One Day I Will Kill You" / "Rockabilly Funeral" – Ewing Records, 2001
- "Telephone the Dead" – TKO Records, 2007 (split with Demented Are Go's "Sickness in Truth")

Videos

- "Down in the Lab" (Shrunken Head) – Director: B. Bosler
- "Who the Hell is Mrs. Valdez?" (Tiki Man) – Directors: A. Collins and M. Peterson
- "Last Time I Saw Cole" (Tijuana Hit Squad) – Directors: A. Collins and M. Peterson
- "The Second Solution (voodoo horror short)" – Director: G. Zuccarini

Compilation albums featuring Deadbolt tracks

- Staring at the Sun, Vol. 2 (Blindspot Records, 1992) – "Who the Hell is Mrs. Valdez" and "Edie"
- Musica del Diablo: Live from the Casbah (Cargo Records, 1993) – "You Don't Want to Know Me"
- Staring at the Sun, Vol. 3 (Blindspot Records, 1993) – "Listen to the Messages"
- Saint Doug: San Diego Local Music Soundtrack (91-X, 1994) – "I Saw the King"
- 91-Xmas (91-X, 1994) – "Post Office Christmas Party" and "I'm the One Who Gunned Santa Down"
- Secret Agent S.O.U.N.D.S. (Mai Tai Records, 1995) – "James Bond Theme/You Only Live Twice"
- Halloween Hootenanny (Zombie-A-Go-Go Records, 1998) – "Psychic Voodoo Doll"
- Tigermask: Trash Au Go-Go (Dionysus Records, 1998) – "Magimbu"
- Hotter Than Hell: An Injection of Psychobilly Madness (Hairball 8 Records, 2000) – "The Interview"
- Monster Party 2000 (MuSick Recordings, 2000) – "Billy's Dead"
- That's New Pussycat! Surf Tribute to Burt Bacharach (Om Om Records, 2003) – "Raindrops Keep Fallin' on my Head"
- Dear Johnny... A Tribute to CASH (Hairball 8 Records, 2004) – "Orange Blossom Special"
- Kicked out of Purgatory (Hairball 8 Records, 2004) – "Billy's Dead"
