= Heavy Vegetable =

California-based rock band

- Origin: Encinitas, California
- Genre: Indie pop
- Years active: 1992–1995
- Label: Headhunter
- Past members: Rob Crow; Travis Nelson; Eléa Tenuta; Manolo Turner

Heavy Vegetable was a rock band based in Encinitas, California, which featured guitarist and lead singer Rob Crow, singer Eléa Tenuta, bassist Travis Nelson and drummer Manolo Turner. 11 years after their final studio album was released, Crow, Nelson, and Turner reunited as Other Men and produced the album Wake Up Swimming, which was released in 2007.

== Discography ==
=== Studio albums ===
- The Amazing Undersea Adventures of Aqua Kitty and Friends (1994, Headhunter/Cargo)
- Frisbie (1995, Headhunter/Cargo)

=== Compilations ===
- Mondo Aqua Kitty (2000, Headhunter/Cargo)

=== Extended plays ===
- A Bunch of Stuff EP (1993, The Way Out Sound)

=== Other appearances ===
- Eyesore: A Stab at the Residents (1996, Vaccination Records) – "Time's Up"
