= See You in Magic =

Studio album by The Night Marchers
- Released: April 22, 2008
- Recorded: 2007
- Genre: Rock, indie rock, garage rock
- Label: Vagrant
- Producer: John Reis

Professional ratings
Review scores
Source	Rating
Allmusic	4/5 stars
Billboard	(?)

See You in Magic is the debut album by the San Diego, California rock band The Night Marchers, released in 2008 by Vagrant Records and Swami Records. The Night Marchers are the latest musical project of singer/guitarist John Reis, previously of Pitchfork, Drive Like Jehu, Rocket from the Crypt, the Hot Snakes, and the Sultans. Reis announced the group's formation in August 2007, after all of his previous acts had broken up by January of that year. The band also includes Beehive and the Barracudas guitarist Gar Wood, CPC Gangbangs bassist Tommy Kitsos, and former Delta 72 drummer Jason Kourkounis. Wood and Kourkounis had previously recorded and performed with Reis in the Hot Snakes. The band members are credited on the album using pseudonyms that they had used in their previous acts: Reis is credited as "Speedo" (his stage name in Rocket from the Crypt), Wood as "Dner" (Beehive and the Barracudas), Kitsos as "Skitsos" (CPC Gangbangs), and Kourkounis as "Jsinclair" (Hot Snakes).

In announcements leading up to the album, Reis described the sound of the music as an amalgamation of his previous bands and influences:

"The sound is a combonation [sic] of everything I've been a part of dating back to my prepubescent days in Pitchfork. Similar to Hot Snakes but not as sinister yet still maintaining some of the drama and subsonic boom. Akin to the rockin' fun of RFTC but without the same kind of riffery. Like the Sultans but not as straightforward yet still maintaining the sense of melody and pop of the 2nd record. Occasional nods to the Flamin' Groovies, Real Kids, Byrds, boogie rock era Status Quo, Bo Diddley, Chess Records in general, Wipers, Michael Yonkers and Shuggie Otis are evident to me."

Critical response to the album has been generally positive. Tim Sendra of Allmusic rated it 4 out of 5, calling it "Pure, hard, fun and nasty rock & roll action" and "an album of rampaging hard rock that kicks hard and sticks with you like a monster hangover." Comparing the album to Reis' past musical efforts, he likens it most closely to the Sultans, saying of the music: "The guitars are taut and fierce, the drums pounding but not over-bearing, and the occasional shouted backing vocals mix well with Reis' powerful everyman vocal delivery. Reis' skill at crafting songs with hooky choruses has never deserted him and is strong as ever here."

== Track listing ==
All songs written by John Reis

1. "Closed for Inventory" 2:48
2. "In Dead Sleep (I Snore ZZZZ)"
3. "I Wanna Deadbeat You"
4. "Jump in the Fire" 3:48
5. "Branded"
6. "Whose Lady R U?" 4:07
7. "You've Got Nerve" 5:28
8. "Open Your Legs"
9. "Bad Bloods"
10. "And I Keep Holding On" 4:56
11. "Total Bloodbath"
12. "Panther in Crime"
13. "We're Goin' Down"

== Performers ==
- Speedo (John Reis) - guitar, lead vocals
- Dner (Gar Wood) - guitar, backing vocals
- Skitsos (Tommy Kitsos) - bass guitar
- Jsinclair (Jason Kourkounis) - drums

== Studio personnel and recording details ==
- Recorded by Dave Gardner at City of Refuge and Seedy Underbelly, assisted by Adam
- Additional engineering by Eric Olsen
- Mixed by Ben Moore at City of Refuge
- Art, design, and band photo by Ben Goetting
