= Dan Sartain vs. the Serpientes =

Studio album by Dan Sartain
- Released: 2005
- Recorded: 2001, 2002, February 2003
- Genre: Rock and roll, rockabilly, blues
- Label: Swami

Dan Sartain chronology
Sartain Family Legacy 1981-1998 (2005)	Dan Sartain vs. the Serpientes (2005)	Join Dan Sartain (2006)

Professional ratings
Review scores
Source	Rating
Allmusic	4/5 stars

Dan Sartain vs. the Serpientes is the third album by the Birmingham, Alabama rock musician Dan Sartain, released in 2003 by Swami Records. It was Sartain's first commercially available album, his previous efforts Crimson Guard and Romance in Stereo having been self-produced and self-released. Several tracks from these albums were re-used on Vs. the Serpientes, while others were re-recorded. Several additional musicians from the Swami label recorded on the album, including members of Rocket from the Crypt, Hot Snakes, Sultans, Beehive and the Barracudas, and The Heartaches.

== Track listing ==
No.	Title	Length
1.	"Tryin' to Say"	2:11
2.	"P.C.B. '98"	2:27
3.	"I Could Have Had You" (Taken from the album Crimson Guard (2001)))	2:31
4.	"Walk Among the Cobras Pt. I"	3:13
5.	"Cobras Pt. II"	2:44
6.	"Cobras Pt. III"	3:18
7.	"Place to Call My Home" (Taken from the album Crimson Guard (2001)))	2:44
8.	"Love is Crimson"	1:57
9.	"Leeches Pt. I"	1:48
10.	"Lonely Hearts"	1:36
11.	"Metropolis"	2:37
12.	"Auto Pilot" (Taken from the album Romance in Stereo (2002))	1:59
13.	"Romance"	4:29
14.	"Got That Feeling"	3:16

== Performers ==
- Dan Sartain - vocals, guitar, bass guitar, drums, piano
- John Reis - bass guitar and marracas on track 1, bass guitar and keyboards on tracks 2 and 11, guitar, bass guitar and drum machine on track 9, backing vocals on track 10, marimba on track 12
- Mario Rubalcaba - drums on tracks 2, 9, and 11
- Dean Reis - keyboards on track 2, bass guitar and backing vocals on track 10
- Zach Evans - drums on track 3
- Kylie Jackson - handclaps and backing vocals on track 3
- Destin Edge - bass guitar on track 4
- Jason Crane - drums on track 5, bass guitar on track 8, horns on track 13
- Gar Wood - backing vocals on track 5, push button bass on track 6, lead guitar on track 8
- Andy Stamets - guitar and scales on track 6
- Dustin Milsap - guitar on track 6

== Album information ==
- Record label:Swami Records
- Tracks 1, 2, 9, 10, and 11 recorded at Drag Racist studios in San Diego, California in February 2003 by John Reis.
- Tracks 5, 6, 8, and 13 recorded at Strange Sounds in San Diego, California in February 2003 by Gar Wood.
- Tracks 3, 4, 7, and 12 recorded by Dan Sartain in his garage in Birminghman, Alabama in 2001 and 2002.
- Photos by Wex Frazer
- Donkey photo by John Reis
- Cover lettering by Courtney
