= Audit in Progress =

Studio album by Hot Snakes
- Released: October 5, 2004
- Recorded: 2004
- Studios: Big Fish Recorders (San Diego, CA)
- Genres: Punk rock; garage punk; post-hardcore
- Length: 33:26
- Label: Swami
- Producer: John Reis

Hot Snakes chronology
| Suicide Invoice (2002) | Audit in Progress (2004) | Peel Sessions (2005) |

Audit in Progress is the third studio album by the San Diego, California, rock band Hot Snakes, released in 2004 by Swami Records. It was recorded in a similar manner to the band's previous two albums, with guitarist John Reis taking time off from his main band Rocket From the Crypt. In comparison to the band's previous albums, Audit in Progress is more aggressive and primal. Audit in Progress would be Hot Snakes' final studio album until 2018's Jericho Sirens, as the members decided to disband following a tour of Australia in Spring 2005 (though Thunder Down Under, a live-in-the-studio album recorded during the tour, was released posthumously in 2006).

== Artwork ==
As a visual artist and illustrator singer/guitarist Rick Froberg provided the album's artwork, while Reis released the album through his Swami Records label. It was the first Hot Snakes release to feature drummer Mario Rubalcaba, brought in to fill the position left vacant by original drummer Jason Kourkounis.

== Promotion ==
At this time the band was able to tour much more extensively than they had in support of previous albums, travelling the United States, Europe and Australia. An independent music video was filmed for the song "Braintrust" and a single for the song was planned for release in the UK market (which also would have included the unreleased song "DNR"), but when "Braintrust" was included on the band's Peel Sessions EP the following year the proposed single was cancelled.

== Reception ==
Professional ratings
Review scores
| Source | Rating |
|---|---|
| AllMusic | 4/5 stars |
| Drowned in Sound | 8/10 |
| Louder Sound | 8/10 |
| Ox-Fanzine | 4.5/5 stars |
| Pitchfork | 7.7/10 |
| PopMatters | 8/10 stars |
| Record Collector | 3/5 stars |
| Spin | A |
| Stylus | B+ |
| Tiny Mix Tapes | 4.5/5 stars |

=== Initial ===
The album was well received by critics and fans. Joseph Larkin called it "the most ferocious record in the Hot Snakes discography, [it] rarely lets up [and] pummels without mercy." Spin noted the album's "loud, throttling punk-rock elegance" and compared it to Drive Like Jehu. The latter comparison was again made by Nick Cowen, noting that despite replacing their original drummer: "the Hot Snakes manifesto remains “If it ain’t broke, don’t fix it”. Not bad for a band playing some of the most blistering punk rock around." Brian Howe was slightly less positive, citing the aforementioned replacement as one of the reasons: "While Rubalcaba is a proficient percussionist possessed of a distinct style, his crisper, more rigid drumming simply doesn't mesh as well with Hot Snakes' metallic doom-rock guitars and monotone shout-alongs as Kourkounis's rumbling, primal pounding did. Audit in Progress remains sufficiently fierce, but sounds a little tinny when compared to the rippling muscles of 2002's Suicide Invoice." Jean-Pierre of Tiny Mix Tapes called it "one of the finest albums of the 2004 [sic], hands down."

=== Awards ===
Audit in Progress was named "best punk album" at the 2005 San Diego Music Awards.

=== In popular culture ===
"This Mystic Decade" was featured on the soundtrack of Grand Theft Auto V.

=== Retrospective ===
The album received renewed critical attention upon being reissued. Nad Khan noted that on the album, "everything is cranked up a notch to quash any signs of complacency. Influences like Suicide and the more torte instrumental elements of previous incarnations like Pitchfork and Drive Like Jehu shine through the roughed-up recordings. The emergence of a hardcore indebted new wave has clearly been influenced by this album, with the likes of Pissed Jeans and Fucked Up all taking cues within their chosen musical styles." In a review of Jericho Sirens, Vish Khanna calls the album and its predecessors "highwater marks for American punk". Emma Johnston called it "fiery, furious" and "cathartic". Alun Hamnet was, however, more mixed, noting the influence of The Wipers and comparing it unfavorably to their previous releases.

== Track listing ==
All tracks are written by Hot Snakes.

| No. | Title | Length |
|---|---|---|
| 1. | "Braintrust" | 1:59 |
| 2. | "Hi-Lites" | 2:41 |
| 3. | "Retrofit" | 2:54 |
| 4. | "Kreative Kontrol" | 2:22 |
| 5. | "Think About Carbs" | 2:13 |
| 6. | "Audit in Progress" | 2:30 |
| 7. | "Hatchet Job" | 3:40 |
| 8. | "This Mystic Decade" | 3:03 |
| 9. | "Lovebirds" | 3:14 |
| 10. | "Reflex" | 3:03 |
| 11. | "Hair and DNA" | 2:30 |
| 12. | "Plenty for All" | 1:17 |
| Total length: | | 33:26 |

== Personnel ==
- Rick Froberg – guitar, lead vocals
- John Reis – guitar, backing vocals
- Gar Wood – bass, Magi 44 organ
- Mario Rubalcaba – drums
- Ben Moore – recording, mixing
- Johathan Kreinik – recording
- John Reis – recording
- Gar Wood – recording
- Dave Gardner – mastering
- Artwork by Rick Froberg
