= The Husbands (band) =

American garage punk band

The Husbands are an all-female American garage punk band that formed in 2002 in San Francisco, California, United States. The band has gone on an international concert tour in the United States and Montreal, Quebec, Canada. They have two albums on Swami Records. They have toured the United States four times performing with bands such as Dead Moon, Demolition Doll Rods, Beehive and The Baracudas, The Sultans, Hot Snakes and The Black Lips

As of 2007, the band includes Sarah Reed, Sadie Shaw, and Casey Ward and previously included Nikki Sloate, Tina Luchesi, Donny Nuenhausen, John Dwyer, Matt Hartman and others. Sadie Shaw was previously the keyboardist in the punk goth band The Vanishing on Gold Standard Laboratories. Casey Ward also played keys in the black metal band Weakling.

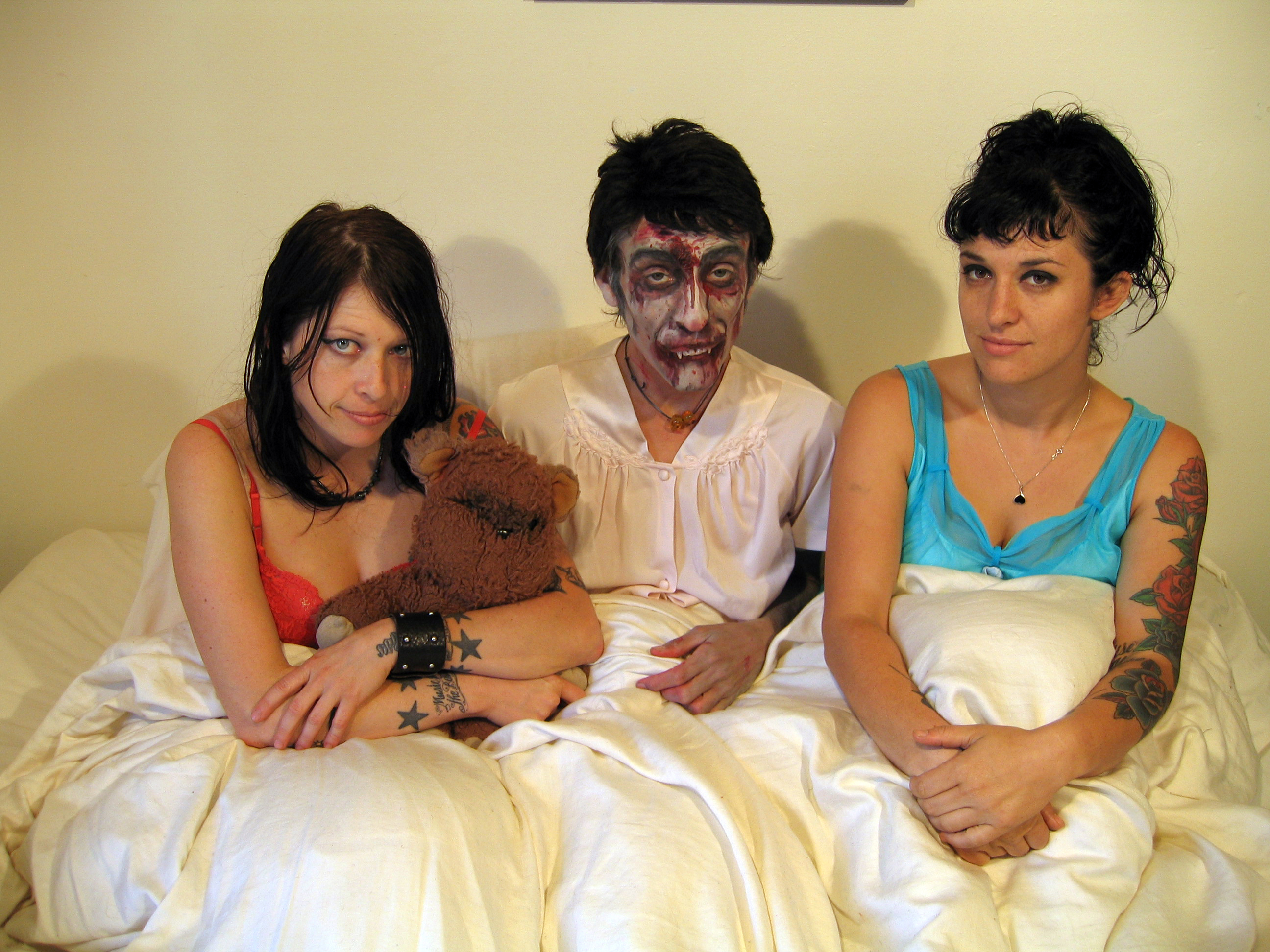
Sarah and Sadie in bed with their mascot

== Discography ==
- Introducing The Husbands CD/LP Swami Records - produced by John Reis
- There's Nothing I'd Like More Than To See You Dead CD Swami Records - produced by Phil Manley
