= Rick Froberg =

American musician and visual artist (1968–2023)

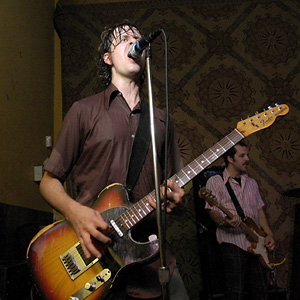
- Froberg performing with the Hot Snakes on October 7, 2005, in Philadelphia.

Background information
- Also known as: Rick Farr, Rick Fork
- Born: January 19, 1968; Santa Monica, California, U.S.
- Died: June 30, 2023 (aged 55) San Diego, California, U.S.
- Genres: Punk rock, post-punk, post-hardcore, indie rock, garage rock, garage punk
- Instruments: Guitar, vocals
- Years active: 1986–2023
- Formerly of: Crash Worship; Pitchfork; Drive Like Jehu; Hot Snakes; Obits

Eric Gerald Farr (né Froberg; January 19, 1968 – June 30, 2023) was an American musician and visual artist. In his musical career he was the singer and guitarist for the San Diego-area bands Pitchfork, Drive Like Jehu, and Hot Snakes, performing alongside fellow San Diego musician John Reis. Froberg also played with the Last of the Juanitas, Thingy, Obits, and Crash Worship.

== Life and career ==
Eric Gerald Froberg was born on January 19, 1968, in Santa Monica, California. His family moved to Carlsbad in 1976. Froberg's father changed his family's name to "Farr" in 1979, but Froberg opted to use the original form as his stage name.

In his career as a visual artist and illustrator he created album art, promotional artwork, and merchandise designs for all of his bands as well as for Rocket from the Crypt and Reis' Swami Records label. In 2025, Akashic Books published Plenty For All: The Art of Rick Fröberg, showcasing a range of Froberg's works, including pen and ink drawings, band and music-related art, linocuts, commercial work, paintings, and watercolors.

Froberg died in San Diego on June 30, 2023, at the age of 55, from an undiagnosed heart condition.

Rick Froberg discography
Year	Act	Title	Credits
1987	Crash Worship	This	drums
1989	Pitchfork	Saturn Outhouse	lead vocals, album art
1990	Pitchfork	Eucalyptus	lead vocals, album art
1991	Drive Like Jehu	Drive Like Jehu	guitar, lead vocals, album art
1992	Drive Like Jehu	"Hand Over Fist" / "Bullet Train to Vegas"	guitar, lead vocals, album art
1992	Rocket from the Crypt	Boychucker	album art
1994	Drive Like Jehu	Yank Crime	guitar, lead vocals, album art
1998	Rocket from the Crypt	RFTC	album art
1998	Rocket from the Crypt	"Break it Up"	album art
2000	Hot Snakes	Automatic Midnight	guitar, lead vocals, album art
2002	Hot Snakes	Suicide Invoice	guitar, lead vocals, album art
2003	Beehive & the Barracudas	In Dark Love	album art
2004	Hot Snakes	Audit in Progress	guitar, lead vocals, album art
2004	Hot Snakes	"This Mystic Decade"	guitar, lead vocals, album art
2005	Hot Snakes	Peel Sessions	guitar, lead vocals, album art
2006	Hot Snakes	Thunder Down Under	guitar, lead vocals, album art
2006	Mr. Tube and the Flying Objects	Listen Up	album art
2008	Obits	"One Cross Apiece" / "Put It in Writing"	guitar, lead vocals, album art
2009	Obits	I Blame You	guitar, lead vocals, album art
2009	Obits	"I Can't Lose" / "Military Madness"	guitar, lead vocals
2011	Obits	Moody, Standard and Poor	guitar, lead vocals, album art
2012	Obits	"Let Me Dream If I Want To" / "The City Is Dead"	guitar, lead vocals
2012	Obits	"Refund" / "Suez Canal"	guitar, lead vocals
2013	Obits	"Refund (Live)" / "Talking to the Dog (Live)"	guitar, lead vocals
2013	Obits	Bed and Bugs	guitar, lead vocals, album art
2018	Hot Snakes	Jericho Sirens	guitar, lead vocals
