= The Night Marchers =

American rock band

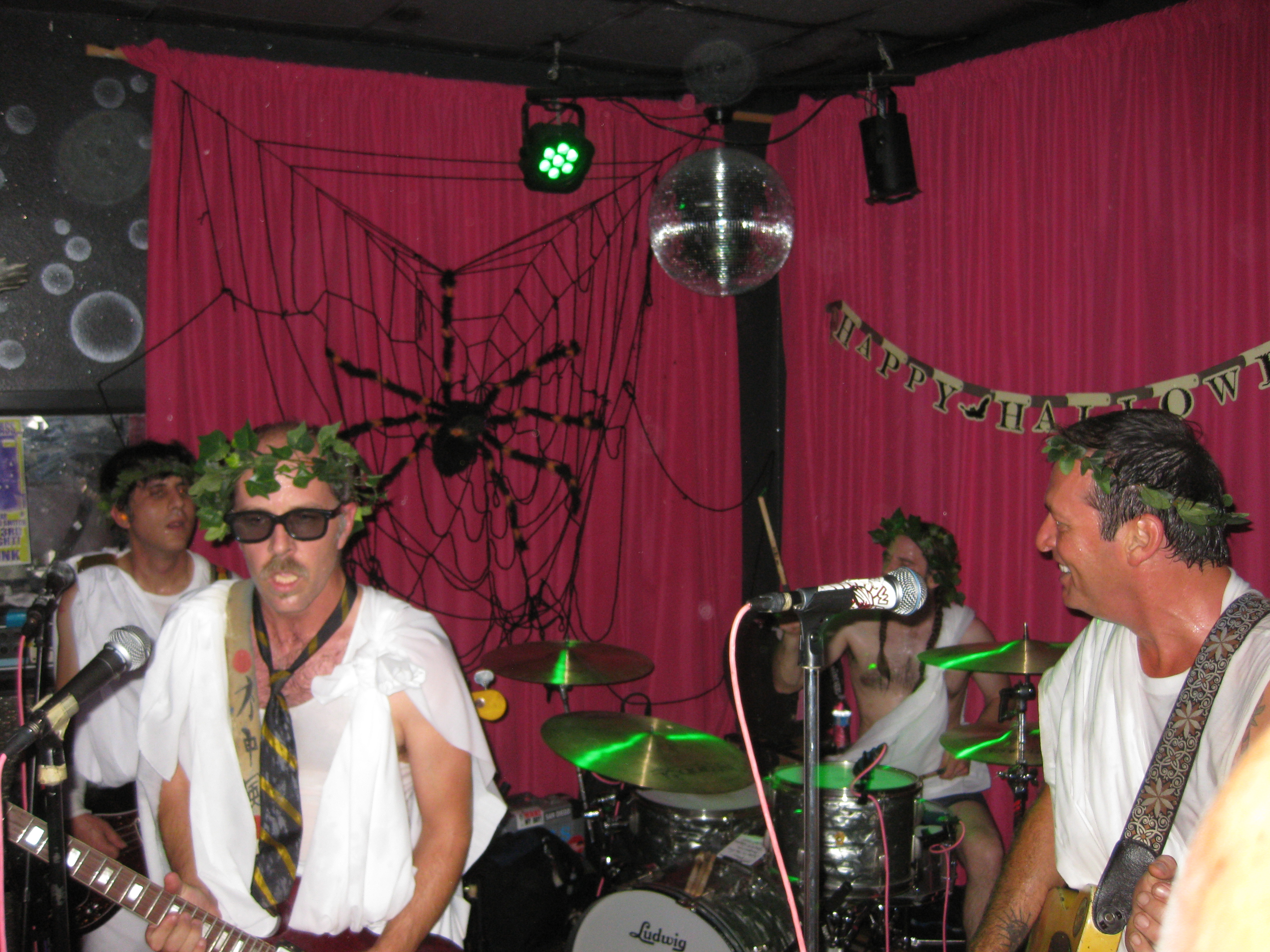
- Left to right: Kitsos, Wood, Kourkounis, and Reis playing a Halloween show in 2012

Background information
- Origin: San Diego, California, U.S.
- Genres: Alternative rock, garage rock
- Years active: 2007–present
- Label: Vagrant
- Members: John Reis; Gar Wood; Tommy Kitsos; Jason Kourkounis
- Website: myspace.com/thenightmarchers

The Night Marchers are an American alternative rock band formed in 2007 in San Diego, California, United States. The band is composed of singer/guitarist John Reis, guitarist Gar Wood, bassist Tommy Kitsos, and drummer Jason Kourkounis. Reis, Wood, and Kourkounis had previously performed together in the Hot Snakes, while Kitsos previously performed with CPC Gangbangs. The Night Marchers' debut album See You in Magic was released in 2008 through Vagrant Records. The Allez Allez track “Fisting The Fan Base” was featured on the NHL 15 soundtrack.

== History ==
The Night Marchers were formed by singer/guitarist John Reis after the breakups of his previous musical acts. Reis had previously performed in numerous bands including Pitchfork (1986–1990), Drive Like Jehu (1990–1995), Rocket from the Crypt (1990–2005), Hot Snakes (1999–2005), and Sultans (2000–2007). After the breakup of the Sultans in January 2007 Reis took a break from performing, focusing on raising his new child, opening a recording studio and a bar, and running his record label Swami Records. He announced the formation of a new group in August 2007, including guitarist Gar Wood, bassist Tommy Kitsos, and drummer Jason Kourkounis. All of the members had previously been active in other bands: Wood had performed in Beehive and the Barracudas, Kitsos in CPC Gangbangs, and Kourkounis in The Delta 72. Wood and Kourkounis had also previously been members of the Hot Snakes with Reis. In The Night Marchers the members use pseudonyms that they had used with their previous acts. Reis goes by "Speedo", the name he had used in Rocket from the Crypt. Wood uses the stage name "Dner" which he had also used in Beehive and the Barracudas. Kitsos uses "Skitsos", which he had used in CPC Gangbangs. Kourkounis uses the pseudonym "Jsinclair", which he had also used in the Hot Snakes.

Reis described the sound of the new group as an amalgamation of his previous bands and influences:

The sound is a combonation [sic] of everything I've been a part of dating back to my prepubescent days in Pitchfork. Similar to Hot Snakes but not as sinister yet still maintaining some of the drama and subsonic boom. Akin to the rockin' fun of RFTC but without the same kind of riffery. Like the Sultans but not as straightforward yet still maintaining the sense of melody and pop of the 2nd record. Occasional nods to The Flamin' Groovies, Real Kids, Byrds, boogie rock-era Status Quo, Bo Diddley, Chess Records in general, Wipers, Michael Yonkers and Shuggie Otis are evident to me."

He has also remarked that The Night Marchers' sound is more varied that his previous groups, since he no longer has multiple acts dividing his attention:

I used to be in three bands at the same time, and before that I was in two bands at the same time, and it was cool because each band wasn't really active at the same time and it was easy to kind of divide my attention. But now with just doing the one band...I don't have as much time. I can't...I'm not really interested in being in a bunch of bands. So the band, The Night Marchers, were kind of designed to pull off different material. We're not really interested in being eclectic or necessarily trying to fit a bunch of different things in our sound, but there are different songs that we come up with that in the past might have been spread over different bands, and now it's just kind of like "oh, we can just kind of do it all in this band."

The band's debut album See You in Magic was released on April 22, 2008 through Vagrant Records. In an interview, Reis said: “With each year, your perspective gets a little bit broader. My appreciation for different sounds becomes more varied,” says Reis. “And I rely on that feeling to sustain my love and excitement when it comes to picking up an electric guitar. With the Night Marchers, I think our scope of influence is a little bigger than it was with Hot Snakes, who had a bigger scope of influence than Rocket from the Crypt.” Of the songwriting for See You in Magic, Reis said in an interview: “Some of the songs go back a couple years and a couple were written two days before,” Reis said. “It was kind of a large timeframe for me, because usually when you make a record, they’re all kind of part of the same idea that germinated over a two- or three-month period. Creativity for me is something that happens in brief moments where it just happens, and hopefully I’m lucky enough to have a guitar in my hands. It’s not like I can write a song everyday.”

== Band members ==
- John Reis – guitar, lead vocals
- Gar Wood – guitar, backing vocals
- Tommy Kitsos – bass guitar
- Jason Kourkounis – drums

== Discography ==
=== Albums ===
| Year | Title | Label |
|---|---|---|
| 2008 | See You in Magic | Vagrant |
| 2013 | Allez Allez | Swami Records |

=== Singles ===
| Year | Single | Album |
|---|---|---|
| 2008 | "Whose Lady R U?" | See You in Magic |
| 2011 | "Thar She Blows" / "All Hits" | — |
