= Moody, Standard and Poor =

Studio album by Obits
- Released: March 29, 2011
- Genres: Indie rock, garage punk
- Length: 35:03
- Label: Sub Pop (SP857)
- Producers: Geoff Sanoff, Eli Janney, Obits

Obits chronology
I Blame You (2009)	Moody, Standard and Poor (2011)	Bed and Bugs (2013)

Moody, Standard and Poor is the second album by the New York City-based rock band Obits, released March 29, 2011 through Sub Pop.

== Recording and composition ==
Moody, Standard and Poor was recorded at Saltlands Studio in Brooklyn with recording engineer Geoff Sanoff and record producer Eli Janney. The band went through 40 different recordings from their rehearsals when selecting songs to work on for the album. According to guitarist and singer Sohrab Habibion, the songs are "shorter and more concise" than on the band's 2009 debut album I Blame You: "We didn't intend to do that, but that's what we saw happening. It came down to 'How quickly can we get to the point, get in then get out of the song?' The sound of the record is a little more open. It sounds like you're in the room with the band live, which I think is a really nice sound." Owing to throat problems, singer and guitarist Rick Froberg altered his vocal technique on the album, shifting from a yelling to a melodic style.

== Reception ==
Professional ratings
Aggregate scores
Source	Rating
Metacritic	73%
Review scores
Source	Rating
Allmusic	4/5 stars
Alternative Press	4/5 stars
Drowned in Sound	8/10
Spin	7/10

Moody, Standard and Poor received generally favorable reviews from critics. At Metacritic, which assigns a weighted average score out of 100 to reviews from mainstream critics, it received an average score of 73% based on 15 reviews. Mark Deming of Allmusic remarked that the album "suggests that they still haven't resolved the minor flaws that dogged I Blame You, but this time around that seems to matter less ... The best songs on Moody, Standard and Poor are the ones that let the Obits indulge in the interplay that's their musical reason to be, and when they lock in on 'You Gotta Lose,' 'I Want Results,' 'Beggin' Dogs,' and 'New August,' they sound like the first really great guitar band to emerge from the indie underground in years." Jonah Bayer of Alternative Press said that "With their second full-length, these Drive Like Jehu and Hot Snakes alumni have peeled back the distorted layers to get to what lies at their core: seasoned songwriting." David Pott-Negrine of Drowned in Sound praised the timeless sound of the album: "Moody, Standard and Poor somehow manages to sound both old and new, like finding out a lost classic is actually a hot new band. Realistically, it could have been written and released at any point in the last 50 years."

Several critics complemented the sense of sonic space portrayed on the album. Bayer commented that "While Moody, Standard and Poor features everything from surf-inflected rockers ('Everything Looks Better in the Sun') to post-everything spaghetti Westerns ('New August'), the real brilliance lies in the sonic subtleties. It's all about perfect guitar tones, what frontman Rick Froberg doesn't say and the space Obits give their songs to breathe—even though it's evident it's not for lack of technical ability." "There’s a lot of space", remarked Pott-Negrine, "The songs are allowed to breathe. Nothing is hectic or in your face, or trying to grab your attention. There's no yelling. There's barely any distortion. A second listen reveals that there is something going on here; that there’s something bubbling under the surface, working its way under your skin."

Christopher Weingarten of The Village Voice remarked that "If 2009's I Blame You was a stripped-down, bratty MC5 tantrum, then follow-up Moody, Standard and Poor is a more focused Wipers implosion. With surf licks and lo-fi bristle poking through their hooks, it's a gritty blast with a sunny center." Joe Gross of Spin commented that "There's certainly nothing fashion-forward on their second album, and thank goodness. These indie lifers rededicate themselves to the sound of Froberg's gritty yell, backed by a no-bullshit rhythm section, and interlocking, almost clean guitars. The songs are powerfully wiry and declamatory [sic]".

== Track listing ==
All tracks are written by Obits (Rick Froberg, Sohrab Habibion, Greg Simpson, and Scott Gursky).

No.	Title	Length
1.	"You Gotta Lose"	3:28
2.	"I Want Results"	3:30
3.	"Everything Looks Better in the Sun"	3:27
4.	"Killer"	2:35
5.	"Shift Operator"	3:30
6.	"No Fly List"	2:34
7.	"Naked to the World"	2:28
8.	"Spot the Pikey"	1:37
9.	"New August"	3:40
10.	"Standards"	2:21
11.	"Beggin' Dogs"	2:42
12.	"I Blame Myself"	3:11
Total length:		35:03

== Personnel ==
=== Band ===
- Rick Froberg – guitar, vocals, artwork
- Sohrab Habibion – guitar, vocals
- Greg Simpson – bass guitar
- Scott Gursky – drums

=== Production ===
- Geoff Sanoff – producer, recording engineer, mix engineer
- Eli Janney – producer, recording engineer
- Aaron Rutledge – additional engineering
- Joe Lambert – mastering
