= Peel Sessions (Hot Snakes EP) =

EP by Hot Snakes
- Released: 2005
- Recorded: 2004
- Genres: Rock and roll, post-punk
- Length: ~9:09
- Label: Swami
- Producer: Mike Walter

Hot Snakes chronology
Audit in Progress (2004)	Peel Sessions (2005)	Thunder Down Under (2006)

Professional ratings
Review scores
Source	Rating
Pitchfork	7/10 stars

Peel Sessions is an EP by the San Diego, California rock band Hot Snakes, released in 2005 by Swami Records. It was recorded in the Fall of 2004 while the band was on tour in the UK, for broadcast on BBC Radio 1's John Peel program. Hot Snakes would be one of the last groups to record such a session, as Peel died shortly afterwards. It is also the only Hot Snakes release not to feature artwork created by singer/guitarist Rick Froberg.

The EP includes two songs from the band's first album Automatic Midnight and two from their third studio album Audit in Progress, all performed live in a studio setting. It was released in both CD and 7" vinyl formats in the US and UK. A single for the album version of the song "Braintrust" had been planned for release in the UK market, and also would have included the unreleased song "DNR," but because "Braintrust" was included on the EP the proposed single was cancelled.

== Track listing ==
All songs written by Hot Snakes

1. "Automatic Midnight"
2. "No Hands"
3. "Braintrust"
4. "This Mystic Decade"

== Performers ==
- Rick Froberg - guitar, lead vocals
- John Reis - guitar, backing vocals
- Gar Wood - bass
- Mario Rubalcaba - drums

== Album information ==
- Record label: Swami Records
- Recorded and mixed 2004 at Maida Vale Studios for BBC Radio 1's John Peel program (first transmission date: November 18, 2004)
- Produced by Mike Walter
- Engineered by Jamie Hart
- Mastered by Dave Gardner at Magneto Mastering
- Released by arrangement with BBC Music
- All songs written by Hot Snakes and copyright Hiss N' Piss/BMI
