= Ghost Ship (Sultans album) =

Studio album by Sultans
- Released: November 14, 2000
- Recorded: 2000
- Studio: Drag Racist Recorders, San Diego, CA
- Genre: Rock and roll
- Length: 21:13
- Label: Swami Records, Sympathy for the Record Industry
- Producer: John Reis

Sultans chronology
Sultans (2000)	Ghost Ship (2000)	Shipwrecked (2004)

Professional ratings
Review scores
Source	Rating
Allmusic	4/5 stars

Ghost Ship is the first album by the San Diego, California, rock and roll band Sultans, released in 2000 by Swami Records. Both the band and the album began as "side projects" for John Reis during time off from his main band, Rocket from the Crypt. This was also the time at which Reis formed Hot Snakes. Reis collaborated with drummer Tony Brown Di Prima, bringing in Rocket From the Crypt guitarist Andy Stamets while Reis himself played the bass guitar (he is normally known as a guitarist). The band chose the name Sultans for the project and recorded an introductory EP and Ghost Ship, both of which were released that year on Reis' newly formed Swami label. As Reis has a tradition of using different stage names or pseudonyms in his various projects, he chose to be known as "Slasher" in the Sultans, while Stamets chose the nickname "Black Flame".

According to the album's liner notes, Ghost Ship was recorded using pre-used tape and mastered onto a pre-used digital audio tape, with all songs recorded in three takes or fewer and all seven channels tracked directly to tape in a live manner. The notes state that no money was spent on the recording equipment or process. Reis has a propensity for exaggeration and fabrication when describing his musical endeavors, often "dressing up" the truth in favor of telling an interesting story. That said, it is well known that the Sultans preferred a much more stripped-down, raw and direct approach to recording and playing than most of Reis' other projects, opting for minimal effects, studio tweaking or mixing adjustments.

Touring in support of Ghost Ship was limited due to the members' commitments to their other bands. They were able to play several shows in the San Diego area. Reis also toured sporadically with Hot Snakes at this time before he and Stamets resumed working full-time with Rocket From the Crypt. Later tours in support of their second album, Shipwrecked, were more extensive.

== Track listing ==
No.	Title	Length
1.	"Just a Fool (That's Down)"	2:33
2.	"Hold You Down"	1:35
3.	"Heartbreaker"	1:21
4.	"Shakedown"	1:32
5.	"Put Up a Fight"	1:33
6.	"Trust No One"	1:34
7.	"It's Over"	1:36
8.	"My Sights Are Low"	1:14
9.	"Chances Are"	1:49
10.	"(This Ain't No) Solid State"	1:55
11.	"Your Mouth is Open and Your Eyes Are Shut"	1:18
12.	"The Year of Regret"	1:54
13.	"All City Warning"	1:18
Total length:		21:13

== Personnel ==
- Slasher (John Reis) – bass guitar, lead vocals
- Black Flame (Andy Stamets) – guitar, backing vocals
- Tony Di Prima – drums, backing vocals
- Dean Reis – backing vocals

Technical

- John Reis – producer
- Rafter – mastering
- Van – artwork
