= Thunder Down Under =

Live album by Hot Snakes
- Released: August 15, 2006
- Recorded: 2005
- Genres: Garage punk; post-punk; post-hardcore
- Length: 33:33
- Label: Swami
- Producer: Greg Wales

Hot Snakes chronology
Peel Sessions (2005)	Thunder Down Under (2006)	Jericho Sirens (2018)

Professional ratings
Review scores
Source	Rating
Alternative Press	5/5 stars
Drowned in Sound	9/10
Ox-Fanzine	8/10
Pitchfork	7.3/10
Slant Magazine	4.5/5 stars
Spin	4/5 stars

Thunder Down Under is a live album by the San Diego, California rock band Hot Snakes, released in 2006 by Swami Records. It was recorded during the band's Spring 2005 tour of Australia. The entire album was recorded live on May 10, 2005 in the studios of the Australian Broadcasting Corporation for use on the radio station Triple J, and features songs from all three of the band's studio albums.

During this tour the band members had already decided that they would break up on their return to the United States, and made this announcement on their return the following month. Thunder Down Under was released posthumously the following year on guitarist John Reis' Swami Records label. Singer/guitarist Rick Froberg designed the album's artwork while working as a visual artist and illustrator in New York City.

== Reception ==
The album received positive reviews from most critics. Joseph Larkin described it as "a blistering set of songs played down 'n' dirty". Jonah Byer considers it to be not "only a welcome addition to the band’s catalog, but also [...] the most incendiary entry, as well. Recorded live in an Australian radio studio in 2005, the 13 discordant post-everything masterpieces on Thunder Down Under careen into one another like demolition derby participants [...]" Mike Diver went as far as to write that "[e]ven posthumously, Hot Snakes render The Pistols and their sound-alike spawn of today every bit as sincere and passionate as a Louis Walsh-bred boyband." Spin wrote that the album found the band "[s]igning off in feverish style with guitars ablaze." "Every bit as loud, obnoxious, and great as Fear or the Germs, but without sounding retro, Hot Snakes played fast and died young [...]" wrote Jimmy Newlin, "Thunder Down Under, a live recording for Australian radio, is an explosive self-eulogy. Blasting through fan favorites like “Braintrust” and “Suicide Invoice,” [it] is a perfect starting place for new fans and a much-craved new set of recordings for devotees who can’t get enough." A slightly less favorable review came from Jason Crock, who found fault with the fact that the performances did not differ much from their studio counterparts ("weren't their albums essentially live in-the-studio anyways?") and criticized the sound ("The bass is lost behind the clarity of the twin guitars, and the drums are somewhat muffled, nowhere close to the expertly-recorded rhythm section on the band's fine three-album run.") He concludes that the album "fails to capture the group's in-person prowess."

Japandroids picked the album as one of their favorite garage punk albums: "They’re not trying to sound like they existed in 1967, but they have that blood in their veins. They have that same sense of ferocity and wildness about them as the best 60s garage rock records, but played three times as fast, and the singer is screaming instead of singing. [...] [I]t’s incredible. They’re so crazy tight."

== Track listing ==
1. "Braintrust"
2. "Hi-Lites"
3. "Retrofit"
4. "XOX"
5. "Think About Carbs"
6. "LAX"
7. "Plenty for All"
8. "Who Died"
9. "Suicide Invoice"
10. "Kreative Kontrol"
11. "Rock n' Roll Will Never Die"
12. "U.S. Mint"
13. "Let It Come"

== Personnel ==
=== Hot Snakes ===
- Rick Froberg – guitar, lead vocals, cover design and photos
- John Reis – guitar, backing vocals
- Gar Wood – bass guitar
- Mario Rubalcaba – drum kit

=== Additional musicians ===
- Eleanor Logan – organ

=== Studio personnel ===
- Greg Wales – Producer and engineer
