= Crime (band) =

American punk band

- L-R: Fix, Ripper, Rank, Strike (Photo by Michael Goldberg, 1978)

Background information
- Origin: San Francisco
- Genre: Punk rock
- Years active: 1976–1982; 2006–2017
- Labels: Crime Music; B-Square; Solar Lodge; Swami; FYBS; Kitten Charmer; Superior Viaduct
- Past members: Johnny Strike; Hank Rank; Mickey Tractor; Count Fink; Frankie Fix; Ron "The Ripper" Greco; Ricky Tractor; Brittley Black; Joey D'Kaye; Pat 'Mosignor' Ryan

Crime was an early American punk band from San Francisco, California, United States. The band was formed in 1976 by Johnny Strike (vocals, guitar), Frankie Fix (vocals, guitar), Ron "The Ripper" Greco (bass; ex-Flamin' Groovies), and Ricky Tractor (Ricky Williams) (drums). Their debut, the self-financed double A-side, "Hot Wire My Heart" and "Baby You're So Repulsive", appeared at the end of 1976, and is the first single released by a U.S. punk act from the West Coast.

The band's sound was characterized by simple rock-and-roll arrangements played at intensely high volumes. Michael Goldberg, critic for New York Rocker, wrote in 1978: "Crime play loud. So loud that the plate glass window at the opposite end of the club shakes, tables tremble and people hang onto their drinks. Loudness may be Crime's only musical raison d'etre. This band is a literal translation of the concept 'minimal.' Drummer Hank Rank thumps out a simple Bo Diddley beat that is only adequate in the context of the rest of the band. Bassist Ron the Ripper coaxes a thick rumble from his amp that reminds one of the thunder of a bulldozer rolling over rugged terrain. And the guitar playing of [Johnny] Strike and Frankie Fix make you feel like you've been forcefully held underwater for the full 25 minutes of the set."

In Issue #13 of Ugly Things Magazine, critic Mike Stax wrote: "CRIME's music didn't conform to the norm either. They didn't use the standard-issue highspeed buzzsaw guitar approach. Instead their noisy attacks were an unpredictable stew of clanging, howling guitars and shuddering rhythms - more of an intense sonic RUMBLE than anything else."

== Line-ups ==
In the following years Crime changed their line-up several times. Ricky Tractor was fired (later appearing in groups such as Flipper, Toiling Midgets and The Sleepers) and was succeeded by Brittley Black (Larry Black) in 1977. After releasing one single, another double A-side, "Frustration" and "Murder by Guitar", Black was replaced by Hank Rank (Henry S. Rosenthal) that same year. In 1979, Greco left the band and was replaced by Joey D'Kaye (Joey Swails) on bass, who had been the band's sound engineer.

Greco and Black both returned for Crime's last release, the single "Maserati/Gangster Funk" in 1981, while D'Kaye moved to synthesizers and produced the recording.

The band split up the following year. Strike and D'Kaye briefly formed an electropunk duo called Vector Command, while Fix attempted to start a solo career, with a back-up band called The Rockabilly Rebels. Neither produced any record releases at the time.

Ricky Tractor died in 1992, Frankie Fix in 1996, Brittley Black in 2004 and Johnny Strike in 2018.

== Recordings and media ==
Strike, Tractor, Fix, Ripper

Over the course of their career in the late 1970s and early 1980s, Crime officially only released three 7-inch vinyl records. But many bootleg recordings of the band's live performances and demo tapes were sporadically produced throughout the 1980s.

San Francisco's Doomed, a collection of studio recordings and rehearsal tapes, was released with the approval of the band members by Solar Lodge in the United Kingdom in 1991 on vinyl and CD. Fix, Strike and Rank played on all the songs, with Greco playing bass on side one of the LP, and D'Kaye on side two. The album was re-released as San Francisco's Still Doomed (with added tracks and remastering) in 2004 by Swami Records.

Strike, Black, Fix, Ripper

In 1979 San Francisco video company Target Video produced Crime: Live in San Quentin Prison, a documentary of a live performance by the band at San Quentin State Penitentiary in California, where they played for the prisoners wearing exact copies of the uniforms worn by the prison guards.

Sonic Youth featured a cover of "Hot Wire My Heart" on their 1987 release Sister.

Electric Frankenstein featured a cover of "Frustration" on their 1993 release "Action High / Sick Songs".

In January 2010, a book of Crime's early photographs and posters, The Band Crime: Punk '77 Revisited by James Stark, was published by Last Gasp Books.

Strike, D'Kaye, Fix, Rank

In July 2013, a compilation album of unreleased studio recordings, Murder by Guitar: 1976 to 1980, was released on the Kitten Charmer label, remastered under the direction of Strike, Rank and D'Kaye and released on CD and iTunes. After distribution problems with the LP record release, the album was re-released in August 2014 by the Superior Viaduct label, with a limited release of the first 500 on clear red vinyl. The album has garnered mostly positive reviews, including "four-stars" by UK music magazine MOJO, which wrote: "This important release restates CRIME's place in the punk pantheon and fills in the history of a lost pop moment. It also celebrates the diversity of the proto-punk groups: that fascinating moment when change was at hand but the rules were not yet set. Murder By Guitar is a testament to that sense of discovery.". MOJO also rated the album as one of the "10 Best Reissues of 2014".

In a 2007 interview with Resonance Magazine, Johnny Strike stated a boxed set of Crime recordings was to be released by a Spanish label. In March 2015, Munster Records released the box set, Crime - 7x7 with seven-inch 45 rpm single records, each with a distinctive record cover, including a medley of 1950s cover tunes, "Be Bop A Loola" and "Peggy Sue" previously unreleased anywhere.

== Reformation and new material ==
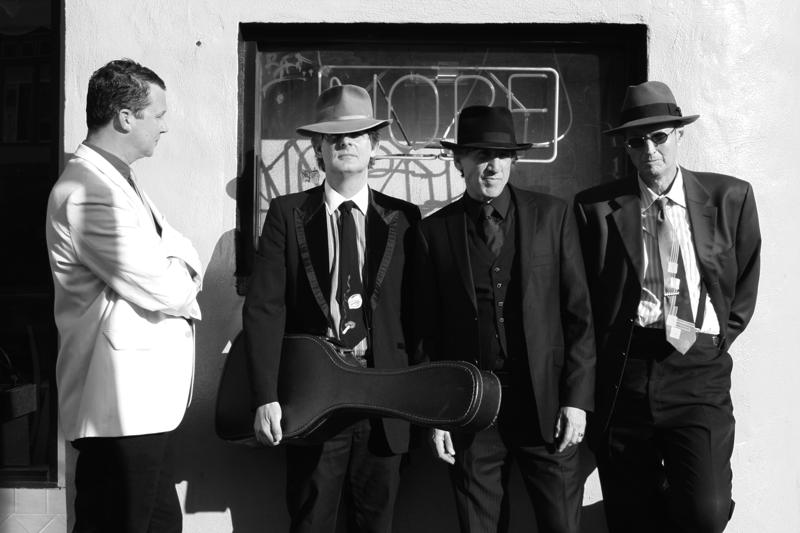
L-R, Tractor, Fink, Rank, Strike

In 2001, Strike formed a new band, The Johnsons, with Jimmy Crucifix (now Jaycee Frances Schmith, bass/vocals) and Biff O'Hara (drums). They changed their name later that year to The Venus Hunters and eventually shortened it to TVH. In 2002 they released the album Night Raid on Lisbon Street on Flapping Jet Records. The unofficial Crime fan site, San Francisco's FIRST and ONLY Rock & Roll Band, reported that Hank Rank had joined TVH in late 2002, replacing O'Hara on drums.

Crime was re-formed in 2005 to headline the Road to Ruins punk festival in Rome. Original members Strike and Rank were joined by: Mickey Tractor on bass, and Pat 'Monsignor' Ryan (formerly of The Nuns) on guitar. In 2008, Crime recorded a new album of rare, older material entitled Exalted Masters, available on LP only, after Ryan was replaced by Count Fink (Brett Stillo of The Flakes) on guitar. They played a half dozen shows in 2008 to support their new album, and collaborated with the Moroccan group the Gnawa Express. A 7" Single, "Extortion/Crazy Beat" b/w "Suwani", with Gnawa Express, was released in 2009.

The current members of Crime have also performed in San Francisco under the band name "Remote Viewers".

== Other works ==
Strike published numerous works of fiction in recent years: Ports of Hell, which is listed in the Rock and Roll Hall of Fame Library, and A Loud Humming Sound Came from Above. With Bold Venture Press, he published the novels Name of the Stranger (2016), Murder in the Medina (2017), The Exploding Memoir(2021). Society of Ghosts (2021) was posthumously published.

Rank has produced numerous films (under his real name, Henry Rosenthal) including the hit The Devil and Daniel Johnston. Ron "The Ripper" Greco is active in San Francisco and released his new album 'Greco's Back with The Dark Gyspies' September 2014.. D'Kaye (under his real name, Joey Swails) continued to work as a Bay Area recording engineer and producer, notably with pop vocal group Destiny's Child and Bay Area R&B band Tony! Toni! Toné!.

In 2015-16, former Crime members Johnny Strike, Hank Rank and Joey D'Kaye, with collaborators Roger Strobel and Michael Campbell, formed the band Naked Beast and released one self-titled LP vinyl album (also available on Bandcamp) on Guitars And Bongos Records.

In the fall of 2018, the original studio tapes of Vector Command were remastered under the direction of Joey D'Kaye and released by HoZac Records as a vinyl LP titled, "System 3".

== Discography ==
- 1976 (7") "Hot Wire My Heart" / "Baby You're So Repulsive"
- 1977 (7") "Murder by Guitar" / "Frustration"
- 1980 (7") "Maserati" / "Gangster Funk"
- 1991 (CD/LP) San Francisco's Doomed
- 1993 (LP) Terminal Boredom (live bootleg)
- 1994 (LP) Hate Us or Love Us, We Don't Give a Fuck (legitimate reissue of live bootleg)
- 2002 (CD) Piss On Your Turntable (bootleg compilation of San Francisco's Doomed and the 7" singles)
- 2003 (CDR) Cadillac Faggot (legitimate release of live bootleg) 100 numbered copies
- 2004 (CD/LP) San Francisco's Still Doomed (reissue with bonus, alternate takes of both songs from the 1976 single)
- 2007 (LP) Exalted Masters
- 2010 (7") "Extortion" / "Crazy Beat"
- 2013 (CD/LP) Murder by Guitar
