= Sultans (EP) =

EP by Sultans
- Released: 2000
- Recorded: 2000
- Genre: Rock and roll
- Label: Swami
- Producer: John Reis

Sultans chronology
Sultans (2000)	Ghost Ship (2000)

Sultans is the introductory EP by the San Diego, California rock and roll band Sultans, released in 2000 by Swami Records. It was the band's first release and contained one track that would also appear on their debut album Ghost Ship later that year.

== Track listing ==
1. "Just a Fool (That's Down)"
2. "Running Far From Home"
3. "Don't Hurry (To Come Back to Me)"
4. "Despise"

== Performers ==
- Slasher (John Reis) - bass, lead vocals
- Black Flame (Andy Stamets) - guitar, backing vocals
- Tony Brown DiPrima - drums, backing vocals
- John Reis - producer
