= Dan Sartain =

American musician (1981–2021)

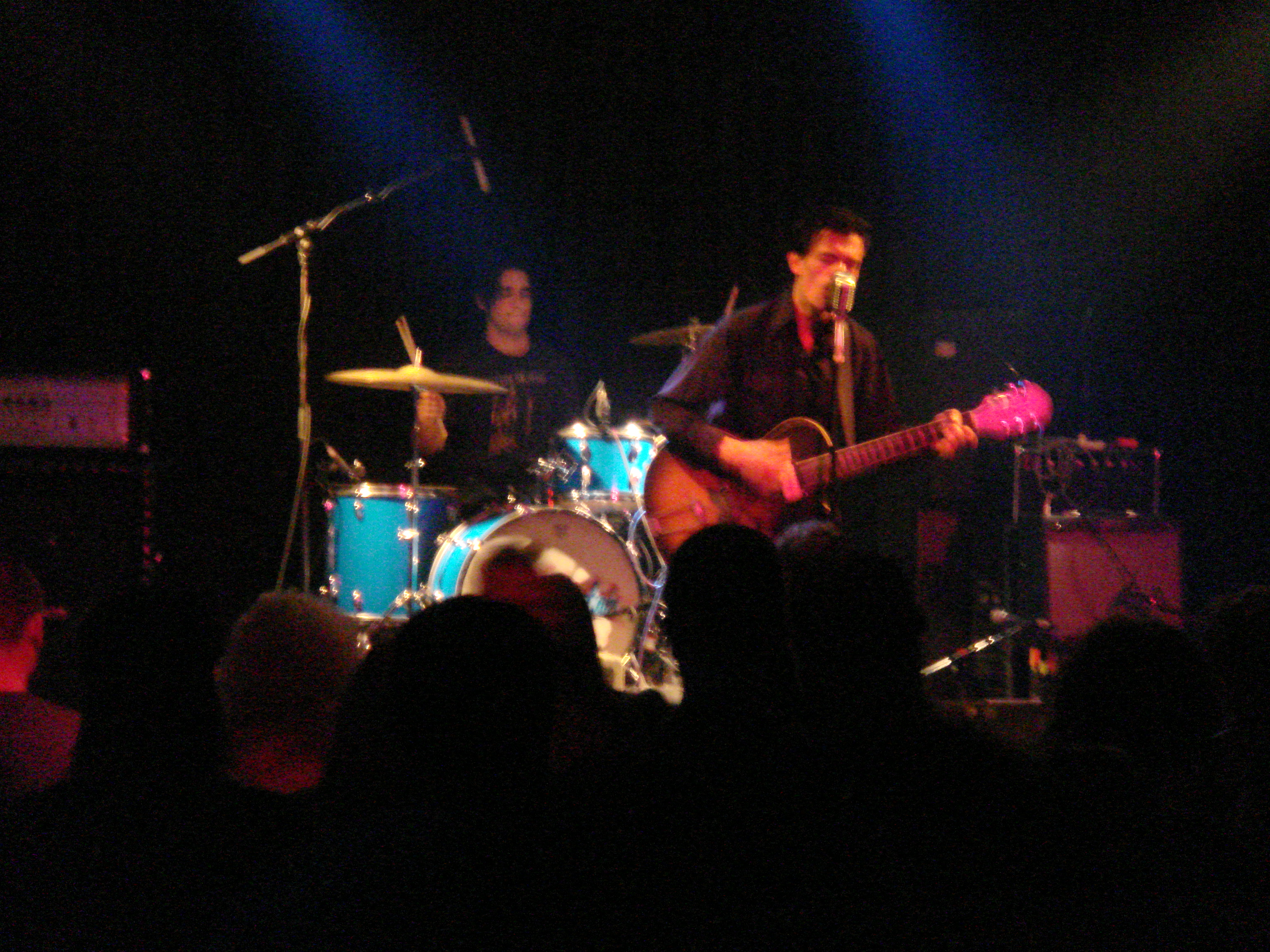
- Dan Sartain performing in Chicago in 2007, with Dean Reis on drums

Background information
- Born: Daniel Fredrick Sartain; August 13, 1981
- Origin: Center Point, Alabama, U.S.
- Died: March 20, 2021 (aged 39) Birmingham, Alabama, U.S.
- Genres: Punk rock, garage punk, rock and roll, garage rock, rockabilly, blues, blues punk
- Occupation: Singer-songwriter
- Instruments: Vocals, guitar, bass guitar, drums, piano
- Years active: 2001–2021
- Labels: Swami, One Little Indian, Skybucket, Cass, Bent Rail Foundation
- Website: dansartain.com

Daniel Fredrick Sartain (August 13, 1981 – March 20, 2021) was an American musician. His music encompasses a variety of genres, including rockabilly, punk rock and the blues.

== Biography ==
Sartain grew up in Fairfield, Alabama, and later settled in Birmingham. In 2001, Sartain's released his first self-produced album, Crimson Guard. The next year, he self-produced and released Romance in Stereo, through an independent record label.

In 2005 Sartain released Dan Sartain vs. the Serpientes, his first commercially available studio album, through the San Diego, California-based Swami Records. This was followed by Join Dan Sartain in 2006.

In 2007, he toured as an opening act for The White Stripes and The Hives. In an interview, Sartain recalled, “Touring with the White Stripes was my Rocky Balboa moment.” In 2009, he released a new single on Jack White's Third Man Records entitled "Bohemian Grove".

In 2010 Sartain released his fifth album, Dan Sartain Lives. His single "Walk Among the Cobras Pt.1" can be heard in the "Russell episode" of the video game The Walking Dead: 400 Days.

Other videogame credits, "Sunset Overdrive(2014), songs "We're going to have a party" and "OD Life".

His songs "Walk among the Cobras pt III" and "Love is Crimson" are credited on the soundtrack of the 2014 film "10 Cent Pistol".

On March 10, 2021, his label One Little Independent Records announced they were parting ways with Sartain on social media. The posts were later deleted.

=== Death and legacy ===
Sartain died on March 20, 2021, at the age of 39. His cause of death was not made public. One Little Independent Records declined to comment after his death.

On December 1 2023, Sartain's friends and colleagues released Dan Sartain Vs. The World (is gonna break your little heart), a tribute album to Sartain.

== Discography ==
=== Albums ===
Year	Title	Label	Format	Other information
2001	Crimson Guard		LP	Self-produced and self-released.
2002	Romance in Stereo		LP / CD	Self-produced and self-released.
2005	Sartain Family Legacy 1981–1998	Skybucket	CD	Limited edition tour album including tracks from Crimson Guard and Romance in Stereo as well as previously unavailable tracks.
2005	Dan Sartain vs. the Serpientes	Swami	LP / CD	First commercially available album
2006	Join Dan Sartain	Swami	LP / CD	
2010	Dan Sartain Lives	Swami	LP / CD	
2011	Legacy of Hospitality			Compilation album
2012	Too Tough To Live	One Little Indian	LP / CD	19 minutes long record recorded and released 2012
2014	DUDESBLOOD	One Little Indian	LP / CD	
2015	Sings	Slice of Wax	LP / CD	
2016	Century Plaza	One Little Indian	LP / CD	
2020	Western Hills	self published via Bandcamp	Digital album	Western TV and film theme covers
2021	Arise, Dan Sartain, Arise!	One Little Indian	LP / CD	Posthumous release.
2023	Dan Sartrain vs Sun Studio	self published via Bandcamp	Digital album	live set of Dan and his band, recorded at the world famous Sun Studios in Memphis, TN.18 May 2020

=== Singles ===
Year	Single	Peak positions	Album
Year	Single	UK Independent Singles	Album
2004	"Who's Sorry Now?"/"This is How They Beat You Down"	–	none
2005	"Tryin' to Say"	–	Dan Sartain vs. the Serpientes
2006	"Walk Among the Cobras Pt. I"	–	Dan Sartain vs. the Serpientes
2006	"Gun vs. Knife"	–	Join Dan Sartain
2006	"Replacement Man"	18	Join Dan Sartain
2007	"Flight of the Finch"	16	Join Dan Sartain
2007	"Thought it Over"	21	Join Dan Sartain
2009	"Bohemian Grove"	–	none
2009	"Hungry End"	–	none
2010	"Atheist Funeral"	–	Dan Sartain Lives
2010	"Doin Anything I Say"	–	Dan Sartain Lives
2020	"Where is Candyman"	-	collaboration with Gangxsta N-I-P

== Videography ==
=== Music videos ===
Year	Song	Album
2005	"Leeches Pt. I"	Dan Sartain vs. the Serpientes
2006	"Walk Among the Cobras Pt. I"	Dan Sartain vs. the Serpientes
2006	"Replacement Man"	Join Dan Sartain
2007	"Flight of the Finch"	Join Dan Sartain
2007	"Thought it Over"	Join Dan Sartain
2010	"Atheist Funeral"	Dan Sartain Lives
2014	"Pass This On"	Dudesblood
