= Automatic Midnight =

Studio album by Hot Snakes
- Released: February 15, 2000
- Recorded: June 1999
- Genres: Post-hardcore; garage rock
- Length: 31:36
- Label: Swami
- Producer: John Reis

Hot Snakes chronology
Automatic Midnight (2000)	Suicide Invoice (2002)

Professional ratings
Review scores
Source	Rating
AllMusic	3/5 stars
Kerrang!	4/5 stars
Pitchfork	7.6/10

Automatic Midnight is the first studio album by the San Diego, California post-hardcore band Hot Snakes, released in 2000 by Swami Records. Both the band and the album began as a "side project" for John Reis in June 1999, during time off from his main band Rocket From the Crypt. Reis wrote and recorded a batch of songs in San Diego with Delta 72 drummer Jason Kourkounis. To provide vocals for the tracks Reis called in Rick Froberg, whom he had played with in Pitchfork and Drive Like Jehu from 1986 to 1995. Most of the material from these sessions was used to create Automatic Midnight, which became the first release for Reis' newly formed Swami Records label.

As a visual artist and illustrator Froberg provided all of the artwork for the album. Although the artwork and cover themselves are black on white, the CD release is packaged in a translucent orange jewel case and the LP in translucent orange shrink wrap, giving the packaged album an orange color.

Touring in support of Automatic Midnight was sporadic due to logistical concerns: Reis lived in San Diego, Kourkounis in Philadelphia and Froberg in New York. When a full touring band was needed Gar Wood was called in to play the bass guitar. The band was not conceived as a permanent project, and after some touring Reis returned to working full-time with Rocket From the Crypt. However, Hot Snakes would reconvene intermittently over the next several years to record two more studio albums and tour, with Wood on board as a permanent member.

== Track listing ==
No.	Title	Length
1.	"If Credit's What Matters I'll Take Credit"	2:33
2.	"Automatic Midnight"	1:33
3.	"No Hands"	2:30
4.	"Salton City"	3:46
5.	"10th Planet"	3:17
6.	"Light Up the Stars"	3:22
7.	"Our Work Fills the Pews"	3:03
8.	"Past Lives"	2:41
9.	"Mystery Boy (aka Jason K.)"	1:59
10.	"Apartment 0"	1:26
11.	"Let It Come"	5:27
Total length:		31:36

== Personnel ==
- Rick Froberg (credited as Nasdaq/Reek Fart) – guitar, lead vocals
- John Reis (credited as Spic Odor/John Re) – guitar, bass, backing vocals
- Jason Kourkounis (credited as Judas Deceased/Jsinclair) – drums
- Kim Thompson – backing vocals on "Salton City"

== Album information ==
- Record label: Swami Records
- Recorded June 1999 at Big Fish Recorders in San Diego by John Reis and Ben Moore.
- All songs published by Mr. Buttermaker Painting
- Artwork by Rick Froberg
