= San Francisco's Doomed =

Studio album by Crime
- Released: 1991, 2006
- Recorded: 1978, 1979
- Genre: Punk rock
- Label: Solar Lodge Records; Swami Records
- Producer: Elliot Maser; Henry Rosenthal

San Francisco's Doomed is a 1978 LP album by San Francisco band Crime.

== Background ==
Side one (tracks 1–11) of the album consists of tracks from a demo recording made in March 1978 at His Master's Wheels studio in San Francisco and was produced by Elliot Maser. Side two (tracks 12–20) were from a demo recording made in August 1979 and produced by Henry Rosenthal at the band's rehearsal studio, Time & Space, in San Francisco. Ron "Ripper" Greco plays bass on side one, and Joey D'Kaye on side two.

== Release history ==
The album was released in the UK on vinyl by punk reissue label Solar Lodge Records and on CD as a split release on Solar Lodge/Overground. Both formats were distributed by Southern. The CD version features a three panel fold-out inlay card featuring pictures and liner notes by Michael Lucas. The LP version does not come with an insert and has the liner notes printed on the reverse of the sleeve.

1000 black vinyl and 1000 picture CD copies of the original album were produced.

The album was remastered and re-released in 2006 by Swami Records in both vinyl and CD versions under the title San Francisco's STILL Doomed. It is in the label's current catalog. The re-release includes bonus tracks of previously unreleased takes of the band's first two singles.

== Track listing (LP) ==
=== Side One ===
1. "Frustration"
2. "Crime Wave"
3. "I Knew This Nurse"
4. "San Francisco's Doomed"
5. "Rock & Roll Enemy No.1"
6. "Piss On Your Dog"
7. "Feel The Beat"
8. "I Be Stupid Anyway"
9. "Twisted"
10. "Murder By Guitar"
11. "Instrumental Instrumental"

=== Side Two ===
1. "Flyeater"
2. "Rockabilly Drugstore"
3. "Dillinger's Brain"
4. "Flipout"
5. "Emergency Music Ward"
6. "Monkey On Your Back"
7. "Yakuza"
8. "Rockin' Weird"
9. "Samurai"
