= Hot Charity/Cut Carefully and Play Loud =

Compilation album by Rocket from the Crypt
- Released: July 16, 2002
- Recorded: 1995 & 1999
- Genre: Punk rock
- Length: 41:17
- Label: Swami
- Producer: Sally Browder, John Reis

Rocket from the Crypt chronology
Live from Camp X-Ray (2002)	Hot Charity/Cut Carefully and Play Loud (2002)	Circa: Now! +4 (2004)

Professional ratings
Review scores
Source	Rating
Allmusic	4.5/5 stars
Ox-Fanzine	8/10
Stylus	A−

Hot Charity/Cut Carefully and Play Loud is an album by American punk rock band Rocket from the Crypt, released in 2002 by Swami Records. It combines two of the band's out-of-print vinyl releases, the 1995 LP Hot Charity and 1999 EP Cut Carefully and Play Loud, into a single release on CD. It includes liner notes by singer/guitarist John Reis detailing the recordings of both releases.

== Track listing ==
1. "Pushed"
2. "Guilt Free"
3. "Poison Eye"
4. "My Arrow's Aim"
5. "Feathered Friends"
6. "Cloud Over Branson"
7. "Lorna Doom"
8. "Shucks"
9. "Pity Yr Paws"
10. "If the Bird Could Fly"
11. "Blood Robots"
12. "Waste It"
13. "Hot Wired"
14. "Who Let the Snakes In??"
- Tracks 1–9 comprise the LP Hot Charity
- Tracks 10–14 comprise the EP Cut Carefully and Play Loud

== Performers ==
- Speedo (John Reis) – guitar, lead vocals
- ND (Andy Stamets) – guitar, backing vocals
- Petey X (Pete Reichert) – bass, backing vocals
- Apollo 9 (Paul O'Beirne) - saxophone, percussion, backing vocals
- JC 2000 (Jason Crane) - trumpet, percussion, backing vocals
- Atom (Adam Willard) – drums

== Album information ==
- Record label: Swami Records
- Hot Charity originally produced by Sally Browder
- Cut Carefully and Play Loud originally produced by John Reis and recorded by Gar Wood at Box Studios in San Diego
- Original layout of Hot Charity by Mark Waters
- Graphics redesigned by Dave Lively
- Remastered by Dave Gardener at Magneto Mastering
