= Yank Crime =

Studio album by Drive Like Jehu
- Released: April 26, 1994
- Recorded: 1994
- Studios: Westbeach Recorders, Big Fish Studios
- Genres: Post-hardcore; math rock; noise rock; emo
- Length: 53:20; 69:58 (re-release)
- Labels: Interscope, Elemental (UK), Headhunter, Swami
- Producer: Drive Like Jehu

Drive Like Jehu chronology
Drive Like Jehu (1991)	Yank Crime (1994)

Yank Crime is the second and final album by the San Diego, California post-hardcore band Drive Like Jehu, released on April 26, 1994, by Interscope Records. It was the band's major-label debut and its artwork was created by singer/guitarist Rick Froberg. The band toured in support of the album but then quietly disbanded the following year as the members moved off to pursue other interests.

In later years, as guitarist John Reis found international recognition with his band Rocket from the Crypt, a gradually growing audience began to pinpoint Drive Like Jehu's music as a catalyst for the eclectic San Diego music scene and the emerging national emo scene of the 1990s. In 2003 Reis re-released Yank Crime on his Swami Records label, including on it the songs from the band's "Hand Over Fist" / "Bullet Train to Vegas" single and the original version of "Sinews" that had appeared on the compilation Head Start to Purgatory.

== Reception ==
=== Initial ===
Professional ratings
Review scores
Source	Rating
AllMusic	4.5/5 stars
The Boston Phoenix	2.5/4 stars
NME	8/10
OndaRock	8/10
Pitchfork	9.0/10
Rolling Stone	3.5/5 stars
Select	3/5 medals

Initial reviews of Yank Crime were largely positive. Shortly after the album's release, The Stanford Daily's Andy Radin called it "a '90s classic" and singled out the song "Super Unison" as its best track ("its raucous first half lead[s] into a long, quiet build-up into a short, intense, orgiastic conclusion"). Writing for The Boston Phoenix, Kevin McDonough noted that "[a] maelstrom of guitar and drums propel all nine songs, so it hardly matters that the arrangements aren't filled with many surprises: the high-quality production (by the band) along with the steady beat and insane shouting vocal style of Rick Froberg put this album a cut above the usual thrash fest." In Trouser Press, Deborah Sprague found the "more viscerally fractious" album "a good deal more compelling: “Here Come the Rome Plows” and the disorienting “Luau” find Froberg sounding like a man pleading for help as the guitar undertow pulls him down for the third and final time."

Its reception in the British music press was similarly positive. Melody Maker published a rave review of the album from Cathi Unsworth, who described it as "the kind of gut-quaking, elegant sonic violence we Brits find so hard to emulate without being bogged down in too many layers of depression or aloof cool. It's [sic] is an instinctive, lip-curling and goddamn exhilarating good rumble." A more mixed review came from Select, with critic Andrew Perry calling the album a "naggingly unpoppy take on post-hardcore power play" in comparison to Rocket from the Crypt that "fall[s] into an occasionally dreary middle ground between Superchunk and Fugazi."

=== Legacy ===
Brendan Reid of Pitchfork rated the 2003 reissue of the album 9.0 out of 10, remarking that "Opening an album with a song as bracingly great as 'Here Come the Rome Plows' would be a shot in the foot for almost any other band, with its snakepit verses and a chorus that goes from balled-up fists to open arms and back again before you can take a breath. 'Golden Brown' does the same in almost half the time. These more straightforward songs sting like snowballs packed with rock-hard chunks of melody, and in each case, Froberg's voice abrades the solid lines down to the bare minimum, and the band fills in the resulting space with pure venom." He also commented on the album's significance to emo, saying "It's often easy to forget that DLJ were considered emo in their day; Froberg's howls of 'Ready, ready to let you in!' on 'Super Unison' seem like a sick parody of stylish vulnerability. Then the song mutates into a gorgeous, snare-drum rolling open sea, and everything you've ever liked (and still like) about this genre in its purest form comes flooding back." The album's significance to the emo genre was also noted by Ned Raggett of AllMusic, who wrote: "Perhaps even more than [their 1992 debut album], Yank Crime solidified Drive Like Jehu's reputation as kings of emo. While use of that term rapidly degenerated to apply to sappy miserableness by the decade's end, here the quartet capture its original sense, wired, frenetic, screaming passion, as first semi-created by the likes of Rites of Spring."

The album was included in the book 1001 Albums You Must Hear Before You Die, which called it "a fearsomely abrasive and inventive fringe-rock artifact that still sets the blood rushing to this day" and "an unmissable look back at one of [punk's] biggest leaps." Rolling Stone ranked it at #16 on their list of the "40 Greatest Emo Albums of All Time". The same magazine described the album as "their math-rock masterpiece". Writing on the album's 20th anniversary, Ryan Bray of Consequence called it a "post-punk classic". Magnet labelled the album a "Lost Classic" and called it "an explosive tangle of careening tempo changes, hoarse-throat vocals, barely contained guitar histrionics and mindful aggression. Its appearance on a major label’s roster was as mind-boggling then as it is nostalgically naive now." Jeff Terich of Treble praised the album as "a symphony of tension and repetition" and "overwhelming. Even by the standards of punk and hardcore, few albums by the mid-’90s arrived with such an unrelenting presence, not to mention a disorienting one. Reis and Rick Froberg’s guitars scrape against each other with aggression and agility, their riffs sustained and even drawn-out to a degree that at one time might never have been considered punk at all." The same magazine ranked it among the "10 Essential '90s Post-Hardcore Albums". In 2015, Gigwise also named the album in their list of "The 11 most vicious post-hardcore albums ever".

In a 2016 interview with Noisey, Reis reflected on the album in the wake of the band's reunion:

I think the second record holds up pretty well, I think because we recorded it the way that we did and we spent so much time working on that record and thinking about it. For me, the wince quotient is really low in comparison to all the other records that I made during that time. There’s always going to be something that doesn’t sit with you well and you don’t have to wait 20 years for those things to happen either. Sometimes it’s literally the day or the week after, like Why did I do that?! There’s always those moments, but listening to Yank Crime again in preparation for getting the band back together and playing those songs again, I was really surprised. I was like, “Man, this sounds really great” and I’m really looking forward to doing this again.

== Track listing ==
=== CD track listing ===
All tracks are written by Drive Like Jehu.

No.	Title	Length
1.	"Here Come the Rome Plows"	5:44
2.	"Do You Compute"	7:12
3.	"Golden Brown"	3:14
4.	"Luau"	9:27
5.	"Super Unison"	7:24
6.	"New Intro"	3:32
7.	"New Math"	4:06
8.	"Human Interest"	3:24
9.	"Sinews"	9:12
Total length:		53:20

2003 reissue bonus tracks
No.	Title	Length
10.	"Hand Over Fist"	4:24
11.	"Bullet Train to Vegas"	2:40
12.	"Sinews" (original version)	9:32
Total length:		69:58

Notes

- The titles of tracks 10 and 11 are incorrectly reversed on the album sleeve.

=== Vinyl track listing ===
Side A
No.	Title	Length
1.	"Here Come the Rome Plows"	5:44
2.	"Do You Compute"	7:12
3.	"Luau"	9:27

Side B
No.	Title	Length
1.	"Super Unison"	7:24
2.	"Golden Brown"	3:14
3.	"Sinews"	9:12

Side C
No.	Title	Length
1.	"Human Interest"	3:24
2.	"New Intro"	3:32

Side D
No.	Title	Length
1.	"New Math"	4:06
Total length:		53:20

== Personnel ==
Drive Like Jehu

- Rick Froberg – lead vocals, rhythm guitar
- John Reis – lead guitar
- Mike Kennedy – bass
- Mark Trombino – drums

Guest musicians

- Rob Crow – backing vocals on "Luau"

Technical personnel

- Donnell Cameron – engineer
- Rick Froberg – artwork
- Joe Kucera – assistant engineer
- Joe Peccerillo – assistant engineer
- Mark Trombino – engineer, mixing
- Paul Waroff – assistant engineer
