= Swami Records =

American independent record label

- Founded: 2000
- Founder: John Reis
- Genre: Punk rock, rock
- Country of origin: U.S.
- Location: San Diego, California
- Official website: swami-records.myshopify.com

Swami Records is a San Diego–based independent record label specializing in punk rock and rock music. The label was founded in 2000 by John Reis, who also has his own radio show, Swami Sound System, on station 94.9FM KBZT in San Diego.

== Releases ==
Year	Artist	Title	Format	Type	Catalog
1999	Rocket from the Crypt	All Systems Go 2	LP, CD	compilation album	SWA 2001
2000	Hot Snakes	Automatic Midnight (co-released with Sympathy for the Record Industry)	LP, CD	studio album	SFTRI 602; SWA 2002
2001	Beehive & the Barracudas	Plastic Soul with the White Apes (co-released with Sympathy for the Record Industry)	CD	studio album	SWA 2004; SFTRI 631
2000	Sultans	Sultans (co-released with Sympathy for the Record Industry)	CD	EP	SWA 2006; SFTRI 633
2000	Sultans	Ghost Ship (co-released with Sympathy for the Record Industry)	LP, CD	studio album	SWA 2007; SFTRI 634
2001	Tourettes Lautrec	Red All (co-released with Sympathy for the Record Industry)	LP, CD	studio album	SWA 2008; SFTRI 644
2002	Hot Snakes	Suicide Invoice	LP, CD	studio album	SWA 111
2002	Rocket from the Crypt	Hot Charity/Cut Carefully and Play Loud (re-release of 1995 LP and 1999 EP)	CD	compilation album	SWA 112
2002	Hot Snakes	Automatic Midnight (re-release of 2000 album)	CD	studio album	SWA 113
2002	Beehive & the Barracudas	Plastic Soul with the White Apes (re-release of 2001 album)	CD	studio album	SWA 114
2002	Drive Like Jehu	Yank Crime (re-release of 1994 album)	LP, CD	studio album	SWA 115
2003	Pitchfork	Eucalyptus + Saturn Outhouse (re-release of 1990 album and 1989 EP)	CD	studio album	SWA 116
2003	various artists	Swami Sound System Vol. 1: 2003 Sales Conference	LP, CD	compilation album	SWA 117
2003	Testors	Complete Recordings 1976–79	LP, CD	compilation album	SWA 118
2003	Beehive & the Barracudas	In Dark Love	LP, CD	studio album	SWA 119
2003	The Husbands	Introducing the Sounds of the Husbands	LP, CD	studio album	SWA 120
2003	Dan Sartain	Dan Sartain vs. the Serpientes	LP, CD	studio album	SWA 121
2003	various artists	Swami Southwest Séance	7"	EP	none
2004	Sultans	Shipwrecked	CD	studio album	SWA 122
2004	Demolition Doll Rods	On	LP, CD	studio album	SWA 123
2004	Rocket from the Crypt	Circa: Now! +4 (re-release of 1992 album)	CD	studio album	SWA 125
2004	Crime	San Francisco's Still Doomed (reissue of 1991 album San Francisco's Doomed)	LP, CD	compilation album	SWA 126
2004	Hot Snakes	Audit in Progress	LP, CD	studio album	SWA 127
2004	Hot Snakes	EP in Progress	CD	EP	none
2005	Hot Snakes	Peel Sessions (7" version co-released with One Little Indian Records as primary publisher)	7", CD	EP	SWA 128 (CD); 469TP7 (EP)
2005	Penetrators	Basement Anthology: 1976–84	CD	compilation album	SWA 129
2005	The Marked Men / Sultans / The Heartaches	"Wait for You" / "She's Gone" / "Prisoner of Love"	7"	EP	SWA 130
2006	Demolition Doll Rods	There Is a Difference	LP, CD	studio album	SWA 131
2006	The Marked Men	Fix My Brain	LP, CD	studio album	SWA 132
2006	The Husbands	There's Nothing I'd Like More Than to See You Dead	CD	studio album	SWA 133
2006	The Bronx	The Bronx	LP	studio album	SWA 134
2006	Hot Snakes	Thunder Down Under	LP, CD	live album	SWA 135
2006	Dan Sartain	Join Dan Sartain	CD	studio album	SWA 136
2006	The Heartaches	Too Cool for School	CD	studio album	SWA 137
2006	Rocket from the Crypt	RFTC 10-31-05	DVD	video album	none
2008	The Night Marchers	"Scene Report" / "Big Enough" / "Love, Death & Cell Phones"	7"	single	none
2008	The Night Marchers	"Mystery Machine" / "Rock-a-By Maybe"	7"	single	none
2008	The Night Marchers	See You in Magic (co-released with Vagrant Records as primary publisher)	LP, CD	studio album	VR 496
2008	The Night Marchers	"Whose Lady R U?" (co-released with Vagrant Records as primary publisher)	7", CD	single	VRUK 078S
2008	Rocket from the Crypt	All Systems Go 3 (co-released with Vagrant Records as primary publisher)	CD	compilation album	VR 508
2008	Beehive & the Barracudas	Pure Commotion	CD	studio album	none
2008	CPC Gangbangs	Mutilation Nation	CD	studio album	SWA 138
2009	Mariachi El Bronx	Mariachi El Bronx	LP, CD	studio album	SWA 139
2011	The Night Marchers	"Thar She Blows" / "All Hits"	7"	single	SWA 140
2012	Mrs Magician	Strange Heaven	LP, CD	studio album	SWA 141
2013	The Night Marchers	Allez! Allez!	LP, CD	studio album	SWA 142
2013	The Night Marchers / Mrs. Magician	"La Gloria" / "Despicable Things"	7"	single	SWA 143
2013	Rocket from the Crypt	"Love Is Lies"	7"	single	SWA 145
2013	Rocket from the Crypt	"In League with Satan"	7"	single	SWA 146
2013	Rocket from the Crypt	"Baker Street"	7"	single	SWA 147
2013	Rocket from the Crypt	"Spinning 'Round"	7"	single	SWA 148
2013	Rocket from the Crypt	"Shy Fly"	7"	single	SWA 149
2013	Rocket from the Crypt	"My Blues Away"	7"	single	SWA 150
2014	Swami John Reis & The Blind Shake	Modern Surf Classics	LP, CD	studio album	SWA 144
2015	Sonny Vincent and Rocket from the Crypt	Vintage Piss	LP, CD	studio album	SWA 145
2016	various artists	Hardcore Matinee	LP	compilation album	SWA 146
2016	Mrs Magician	Bermuda	LP, CD	studio album	SWA 147
2016	Mrs Magician	"Eyes All Over Town" / "I'm Glad You're Dead"	7"	single	none
2016	METZ & Swami John Reis	"Let It Rust" / "Caught Up"	7"	single	SWA 150
2016	Rocket from the Crypt	"Don't Drop the Baby"	7"	single	SWA 151
2020	Swami John Reis	"Ride the Wild Night" / "I Hate My Neighbors in the Yellow House"	digital media	single	none
2022	PLOSIVS	"Broken Eyes"	digital media	single	none
2022	Swami Jon Reis	Ride the Wild Night	12", digital media	album	SWA 152
2022	Meat Wave	"Honest Living"	digital media	single	none
