= Obits =

American rock band (2006–2015)

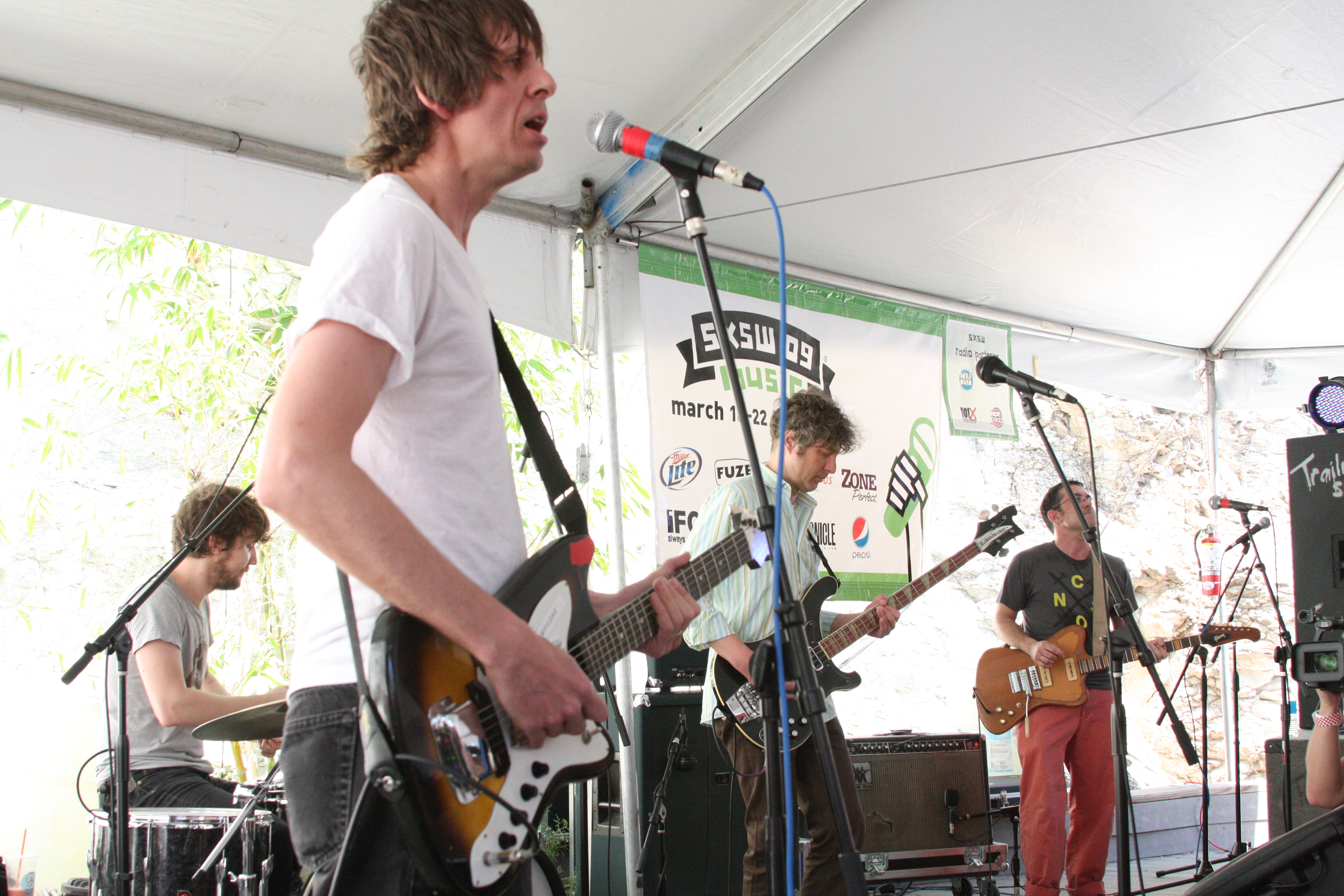
- Obits performing at the 2009 South by Southwest festival. Left to right: Gursky, Froberg, Simpson, and Habibion.

Background information
- Origin: Brooklyn, New York, United States
- Genres: Indie rock, garage rock, garage punk
- Years active: 2006–2015
- Labels: Stint, Sub Pop
- Past members: Rick Froberg; Sohrab Habibion; Greg Simpson; Scott Gursky; Alexis Fleisig
- Website: Obitsurl.com

Obits was an American rock band formed in 2006 in Brooklyn, New York. The band members were veterans of other independent rock bands: Guitarist/vocalist Rick Froberg was previously a member of Pitchfork, Drive Like Jehu, and Hot Snakes, and guitarist Sohrab Habibion was a member of Edsel. The band released five singles and three albums, I Blame You (2009), Moody, Standard and Poor (2011) and Bed and Bugs (2013).

== History ==
Obits formed after singer/guitarist Rick Froberg returned to New York in 2005 following the breakup of the Hot Snakes. In 2006 he began writing new material and rehearsing with drummer Scott Gursky of Shortstack and guitarist Sohrab Habibion, formerly of Edsel. They rehearsed with a third guitar player, but instead added bassist Greg Simpson. Obits made their live debut on January 12, 2008 at a club on New York's Lower East Side called the Cake Shop. A bootleg recording of the show circulated on the internet, and the band posted two of the songs from this recording on their MySpace profile for listening. The recordings caught the attention of Sub Pop A&R representative Chris Jacobs, who invited them to perform at the label's twentieth anniversary festival in Seattle that summer. Obits signed to Sub Pop shortly after, but released their debut single "One Cross Apiece" / "Put It in Writing" on their own Stint Records imprint.

The band's debut album I Blame You was released by Sub Pop on March 24, 2009. Explaining the length of time between the band's formation and recording, Froberg explained that "We wanted to take a, not a relaxed approach, but we wanted to take our time. We weren't in a hurry. We didn't know what would be the result. We didn't know if we were going to put records out. We just wanted to make something happen. We're pleased with what's gone on so far. It's been pretty cool. We try to keep things slow-paced." Critical reception to the album was generally positive, with Allmusic reviewer Mark Deming stating that "if I Blame You isn't going redefine the way we look at rock & roll, it confirms that the word on these guys wasn't wrong — the Obits are a very good band", but also noting that "the Obits might just have the stuff to save rock & roll, or at least keep it off life support for a while, but as good as I Blame You may be, they're going to have to get their songwriting chops in order before they can really finish the job." Jason Crock of Pitchfork Media compared the album to Froberg's past bands, stating that "while there's evidence of growth here, there's not enough change to alienate fans. If they can appreciate a little less mania and a little more melody, I Blame You will be a comfortable fit" and calling it "probably Froberg's most melodic and diverse record."

A second single, "I Can't Lose" / "Military Madness", was released April 18, 2009 in conjunction with the Record Store Day event. Obits toured North America's east coast in April and west coast in May of that year. Obits' second album, Moody, Standard and Poor, was released March 29, 2011, and the band toured the United States' Midwest and East Coast, including playing the 2011 South by Southwest festival. Froberg hopes that, unlike his previous bands, Obits will have more longevity: "Since we're getting older maybe we can grow old into this music. We'll see." Scott Gursky left Obits in May 2011 and was replaced by Girls Against Boys drummer Alexis Fleisig.

The third Obits album, Bed and Bugs, was released on September 10, 2013

On April 1, 2015, the band announced they were splitting up on their Instagram account, later confirming this was not an April Fools' Day joke.

Later that year, Habibion and Simpson joined a new band, SAVAK. Froberg designed their debut album's artwork.

Rick Froberg died on June 30, 2023.

== Musical style ==
Obits' music is a blend of indie rock and garage punk. Mark Deming of Allmusic describes their sound as "taut, straightforward rock & roll with sharply interwoven guitar lines, muscular rhythms, and a melodic sense that splits the difference between indie rock and garage-influenced punk":

Froberg and Habibion make an impressive tag-team combo on guitars, and their interwoven six-string patterns crackle with energy as they bounce thick, bluesy chording off lean, angular lines like a steak meeting a sharp knife. Bassist Greg Simpson and drummer Gursky are just the right rhythm section for this band, locking the songs into place with taut efficiency while leaving room to thoughtfully fill up the spaces when need be. Put 'em together and they run like a top, laying out music with the clean lines of the Ventures and the pure mania of Radio Birdman.

Jason Crock of Pitchfork Media describes the band's sound as "dueling guitars that have refined the echo and twang of surf and rockabilly into a sharp edge, basslines that are less walking than swaggering, drums too respectful and too evil for elaborate fills."

== Members ==
- Rick Froberg – guitar, vocals (2006–2015)
- Greg Simpson – bass guitar (2006–2015)
- Sohrab Habibion – guitar, vocals (2006–2015)
- Scott Gursky – drums (2006–2011)
- Alexis Fleisig – drums (2011–2015)

== Discography ==
=== Albums ===
- I Blame You (2009)
- Moody, Standard and Poor (2011)
- Bed and Bugs (2013)

=== Singles ===
- "One Cross Apiece" / "Put It in Writing" (2008)
- "I Can't Lose" / "Military Madness" (2009)
- "Let Me Dream If I Want To" / "The City Is Dead" (2012)
- "Refund" / "Suez Canal" (2012)
- "Refund (Live)" / "Talking to the Dog (Live)" / "New August (Live)" (2013, 7" vinyl)

=== Compilations ===
- L.E.G.I.T. (2014) [Japanese limited edition singles compilation]

=== Live albums ===
- Die at the Zoo (2021) [Recorded 2012 in Brisbane, Australia]
