= Dan Sartain Lives =

Studio album by Dan Sartain
- Released: May 31, 2010
- Genre: rock and roll, rockabilly, blues
- Length: 30:31
- Label: One Little Indian

Dan Sartain chronology
Join Dan Sartain (2006)	Dan Sartain Lives (2010)	Legacy of Hospitality (2011)

Professional ratings
Review scores
Source	Rating
AllMusic	3.5/5 stars
Clash	7/10
Drowned in Sound	7/10
PopMatters	6/10

Dan Sartain Lives is the fifth album by the Birmingham, Alabama rock musician Dan Sartain, released in 2010 by One Little Indian.

== Track listing ==
No.	Title	Length
1.	"Those Thoughts"	1:56
2.	"Doin' Anything I Say"	2:42
3.	"Bohemian Grove"	2:44
4.	"Prayin' For A Miracle"	2:45
5.	"Walk Among The Cobras IV"	2:07
6.	"Atheist Funeral"	2:30
7.	"Ruby Carol"	2:39
8.	"Bad Things Will Happen"	2:26
9.	"Voo-doo"	2:45
10.	"Whatcha Gonna Do?"	2:11
11.	"I Don't Wanna Go To The Party"	1:45
12.	"Yes Men"	2:04
13.	"Touch Me"	1:59
