= Saturn Outhouse =

EP by Pitchfork
- Released: 1989
- Recorded: 1988
- Genre: Post-hardcore
- Length: 12:37
- Label: Nemesis
- Producer: John Reis

Pitchfork chronology
Saturn Outhouse (1989)	Eucalyptus (1990)

Saturn Outhouse is an EP by the San Diego, California post-hardcore band Pitchfork, released in 1989 by Nemesis Records.

It is the band's only EP and is currently out of print. All 3 tracks were included on the 2003 CD re-release of the band's album Eucalyptus, on Swami Records.

== Track listing ==
1. "Thin Ice"
2. "Goat"
3. "Sinking"

== Performers ==
- Rick Froberg (aka Rick Fork) – vocals
- John Reis – guitar
- Don Ankrom – bass
- Joey Piro – drums

== Album information ==
- Record label: Nemesis Records
- Recorded 1988 at Radio Tokyo
