= I Blame You =

Studio album by Obits
- Released: March 24, 2009
- Genre: Indie rock, garage punk
- Length: 41:31
- Label: Sub Pop
- Producer: Geoff Sanoff, Eli Janney, Obits

Obits chronology
| I Blame You (2009) | Moody, Standard and Poor (2011) |

Professional ratings
Review scores
| Source | Rating |
|---|---|
| Allmusic | 3.5/5 stars |
| The A.V. Club | (B) |
| Music OMH | 3/5 stars |
| Pitchfork Media | (6.3/10) |

I Blame You is the debut album by the New York City-based rock band Obits, released on March 24, 2009, by Sub Pop. Singer/guitarist Rick Froberg, who is also a visual artist, provided the album's artwork. When interviewed about the meaning of the artwork, he commented: "If I get something I like, there's some meaning to it, and I can detect the meaning, I have ideas about what the subject matter might be, but I think it's best if I don't say. That’s the beauty of the whole thing, I get to hear all these different takes on it."

== Track listing ==
All tracks are written by Obits, except where noted.

| No. | Title | Length |
|---|---|---|
| 1. | "Widow of My Dreams" | 4:21 |
| 2. | "Pine On" | 3:36 |
| 3. | "Fake Kinkade" | 3:09 |
| 4. | "Two-Headed Coin" | 4:16 |
| 5. | "Run" | 2:40 |
| 6. | "I Blame You" | 1:07 |
| 7. | "Talking to the Dog" | 2:42 |
| 8. | "Light Sweet Crude" | 3:54 |
| 9. | "Lilies in the Street" | 3:54 |
| 10. | "SUD" | 4:03 |
| 11. | "Milk Cow Blues" (Kokomo Arnold) | 4:15 |
| 12. | "Back and Forth" | 3:34 |

== Personnel ==
- Rick Froberg – guitar, vocals, album art
- Sohrab Habibion – guitar, vocals
- Greg Simpson – bass guitar
- Scott Gursky – drum kit
- Geoff Sanoff – producer, recording engineer
- Eli Janney – producer, recording engineer
- Atsuo Matsumoto and Jim Smith – additional engineering
- Joe Lambert – mastering
- Dave Gardener – additional mastering
