= Mrs Magician =

American band

Mrs Magician is an American band, founded by Jacob Turnbloom, Tommy Garcia (As I Lay Dying, Northern Towns) and Cory Stier (Cults, Weatherbox) from San Diego that formed in 2010. They have toured the country with Rocket from the Crypt, Cults, Metz, Hot Snakes, and Dead Heavens (ex Gorilla Biscuits). Their music has been featured in Rolling Stone, NME, MTV Hive, Guitar Center, Vice, the L.A. Times.

They are signed to Swami Records and have released 2 full-length LP's, both Produced by John Reis (Rocket from the Crypt, Drive Like Jehu, Hot Snakes).
