= Meat Wave =

American punk rock band

- Origin: Chicago, Illinois, United States
- Genre: Punk rock
- Years active: 2011–present
- Labels: SideOneDummy Records, Big Scary Monsters, Swami Records
- Members: Chris Sutter; Joe Gac; Ryan Wizniak

Meat Wave is an American punk band from Chicago, Illinois, United States. Their music is described as post-something, melancholic and aggressive. They have released four albums.

== History ==
Meat Wave was formed in 2011 after Truman & His Trophy disbanded. The trio set out to play with a more aggressive tone than they were used to in their previous ensembles. They toured with Pup in 2016 and with Cursive in 2018.

== Band members ==
- Chris Sutter – lead vocals, guitars
- Joe Gac – bass guitar
- Ryan Wizniak – drums

== Discography ==
=== Albums ===
- Meat Wave (2012)
- Delusion Moon (2015)
- The Incessant (2017)
- Malign Hex (2022)

=== EP ===
- Brother (2015)
- Volcano Park (2021)
