= Suicide Invoice =

Studio album by Hot Snakes
- Released: June 11, 2002
- Recorded: 2002
- Genres: Post-hardcore; post-punk; garage punk
- Length: 33:01
- Label: Swami
- Producer: John Reis

Hot Snakes chronology
Automatic Midnight (2000)	Suicide Invoice (2002)	Audit in Progress (2004)

Professional ratings
Review scores
Source	Rating
AllMusic	3/5 stars
Louder Sound	8/10
Pitchfork	8.8/10
Record Collector	4/5 stars
Spin	8/10
Trouser Press	very favorable

Suicide Invoice is the second studio album by the San Diego, California rock band Hot Snakes, released in 2002 by Swami Records. It was recorded in a similar manner to the band's previous album Automatic Midnight, with guitarist John Reis taking time off from his main band Rocket from the Crypt. As a visual artist and illustrator singer/guitarist Rick Froberg provided the album's artwork, while Reis released the album through his Swami Records label.

== Promotion ==
As with Automatic Midnight, touring in support of Suicide Invoice was limited due to the band members residing on opposite sides of the country, though they were able to tour the United States. The following year drummer Jason Kourkounis departed the band and Reis resumed full-time work with Rocket from the Crypt. The band would reunite in 2004 for another album and more extensive touring, replacing Kourkounis with Rocket from the Crypt drummer Mario Rubalcaba.

== Reception ==
The album was quite favorably received. Emma Johnston writes that the album "takes its foot off the pedal a little, and in the process showcases Hot Snakes’ wonderfully snarky side (any album that starts with a song called I Hate The Kids is alright by us) [...]" Joseph Larkin calls it "arguably [the band's] best effort [...] The mostly mid-tempo album is more experimental than its predecessor, incorporating organ, melodica and seriously clever offbeat lyrics (as in "Ben Gurion," "Paid in Cigarettes" and "Gar Forgets His Insulin")." "The only tropes these guys know are 'kicking ass' and 'taking names,'" writes Eric Carr, "and the rest can go to hell, because Suicide Invoice is nothing but rock viscera in its most elegant simplicity. And sometimes, that's all you need."

Daphne Carr was more mixed in her assessment, criticizing the ironic and emotionally distant tone of most of the album ("the album is another study in rock in jokes [...] Froberg's vocals go from raged to sincere, and on "Why Does It Hurt" he almost sheds the rock persona to identify with his listeners—almost.") She concludes by writing "With this album, Hot Snakes only build their repertoire of rock to satisfy the indie kids looking for something as angry as nu-metal with a tinge more self-awareness."

=== Accolades ===
Pitchfork ranked it the 35th best album of the year.

== Track listing ==
No.	Title	Length
1.	"I Hate the Kids"	3:07
2.	"Gar Forgets His Insulin"	2:22
3.	"XOX"	2:27
4.	"Who Died"	2:30
5.	"Suicide Invoice"	3:25
6.	"Paid in Cigarettes"	4:08
7.	"LAX"	2:02
8.	"Bye Nancy Boy"	2:37
9.	"Paperwork"	2:47
10.	"Why Does it Hurt"	1:45
11.	"Unlisted"	2:46
12.	"Ben Gurion"	2:58
Total length:		33:01

== Personnel ==
- Rick Froberg – guitar, lead vocals
- John Reis – guitar, melodica, backing vocals
- Gar Wood – bass guitar, Magi 44 organ
- Jason Kourkounis (credited as Jsinclair) – drum kit
- Frankie Stains – organ on finale of "Paid in Cigarettes"

== Album information ==
- Record label: Swami Records
- Recorded 2002 at Drag Racist studios by John Reis, Gar Wood and Ben Moore
- Mixed at Big Fish Recorders in San Diego by John Reis, Gar Wood and Ben Moore
- Artwork by Rick Froberg
