= Join Dan Sartain =

Studio album by Dan Sartain
- Released: 2006
- Genre: rock and roll, rockabilly, blues
- Label: Swami
- Producer: Dan Sartain, John Reis

Dan Sartain chronology
Dan Sartain vs. the Serpientes (2005)	Join Dan Sartain (2006)	Dan Sartain Lives (2010)

Join Dan Sartain is the fourth album by the Birmingham, Alabama rock musician Dan Sartain, released in 2006 by Swami Records. Several additional musicians recorded on the album, including Swami Records owner John Reis.

Several songs from the album were released as singles in the United Kingdom and charted on the Independent Singles chart there. "Replacement Man" reached #18, while "Flight of the Finch" reached #16 and "Thought it Over" reached #21. "Gun vs. Knife" was released as a single in the United States but did not chart.

AllMusic stated in its review of the album, "The Birmingham, Alabama singer-songwriter has traces of Hasil Adkins' DNA in his rusting gutbucket rockabilly and his dark, frantic vocal delivery and primitive rhythms providing a direct link to rock & roll's feral backwoods origins."

== Track listing ==
No.	Title	Length
1.	"Drama Queens"
2.	"Totem Pole"
3.	"Gun vs. Knife"
4.	"Flight of the Finch"
5.	"Young Girls"
6.	"Thought it Over"
7.	"The World is Gonna Break Your Little Heart"
8.	"Replacement Man"
9.	"Hangers On"
10.	"Besa Me Mucho"
11.	"I Wanted it So"
12.	"Second Coming"
13.	"Indian Ink"
14.	"Shenanigans"
15.	"Love is Black"

== Performers ==
- Dan Sartain - vocals, guitar
- Raj Parmely - drums and percussion
- Brian Moon - saxophone and xylophone on track 15
- Al Sartain - backing vocals on track 7
- Mariachi Real de San Diego - mariachi band on tracks 4 and 10
- John Reis - organ, guitar, percussion and arrangements on tracks 4, 5, 6, 10, and 11; backing vocals on track 12; maracas on track 9
- Gar Wood - backing vocals on track 13
- Ben Moore - piano on track 5

== Album information ==
- Record label:Swami Records
- Tracks 4, 5, 6, 10. and 11 recorded by Ben Moore
- Tracks 2, 8, and 12 recorded by Liam Watson at Toe Rag studios
- Tracks 7 and 15 recorded by Brian Moon in Birmingham, Alabama
- Tracks 4, 5, 6, 10, and 11 arranged and produced by John Reis
- Tracks 1, 3, 9, 13, and 14 recorded by Gar Wood at Strange Sounds studio
- Mastered by Dave Gardner at Magneto Mastering
- Portraits and artwork by Dan Sartain, based on photographs taken by Wez Frazer, Rachel Lipschwitz, Jonathan Purvis, and Johnny Donhowe
- Layout by Joey Mansfield
