= Eucalyptus (Pitchfork album) =

Album by Pitchfork

Studio album by Pitchfork
- Released: 1990 (re-released 2003)
- Recorded: 1989
- Genre: Post-hardcore
- Length: ~29:31 (re-release ~42:09)
- Labels: Nemesis; Swami
- Producer: John Reis

Pitchfork chronology
Saturn Outhouse (1989)	Eucalyptus (1990)	Eucalyptus (re-release) (2003)

Professional ratings
Review scores
Source	Rating
AllMusic	3/5 stars

Eucalyptus is a studio album by the post-hardcore band Pitchfork. It was released in 1990 through Nemesis Records and re-released in 2003 by Swami Records. The album is the band's only full-length studio album. It was produced by guitarist John Reis and its artwork was created by singer Rick Froberg, who at the time used the stage name Rick Fork.

The album was originally released as an LP in limited numbers and soon went out of print. In 2003, Reis re-released it in CD format on his record label Swami Records, including the tracks from the band's Saturn Outhouse 7" as well.

== Critical reception ==
Kerrang! wrote that "'Burn Pigs Burn' and 'Placebo' showcase guitarist Reis’ intricate yet aggressive approach to his instrument and shaped the sound of post-hardcore." The Chicago Reader wrote that the album "basically sounds like a raw version of Drive Like Jehu." Trouser Press wrote: "On Eucalyptus, Froberg’s yowling isn’t as deranged and developed as in Jehu, but the map is made. Along with Reis’s overdubbed guitars, the sound compares well with the supersonic mania the two went on to compile in their next outfit."

== Track listing ==
1. "Burn Pigs, Burn"
2. "Placebo"
3. "Twitch"
4. "New Kid"
5. "Rana (Frogs)"
6. "Loot"
7. "Flatland Farming"
8. "Drop Dead"
9. "Thin Ice"*
10. "Goat"*
11. "Sinking"*

*Tracks 9–11 comprise the Saturn Outhouse 7" and appear on the 2003 CD re-release only.

== Personnel ==
- Rick Froberg (aka Rick Fork) – vocals
- John Reis – guitar
- Nick Frederick – bass (tracks 1–8)
- Joey Piro – drums
- Don Ankrom – bass (tracks 9–11 on CD re-release)

== Album information ==
- Record label: Original release: Nemesis Records, re-release: Swami Records
- Recorded 1989 at Radio Tokyo by Richard Andrews and Michael James
- All material copyright and published by Pitchfork/Kickin' Bootie 1990.
- Mixed at Westbeach by Donnell Cameron, John Reis, Brett Gurewitz and Simon Cheffins.
- Produced by John Reis
- Re-release remastered by Dave Gardner at Magneto Mastering
- Album cover and insert artwork by Rick Froberg
- CD disc artwork by Garry Davis
- Photos by Miki Vuckovich
