= Shipwrecked (album) =

Studio album by Sultans
- Released: March 23, 2004
- Recorded: November 13–14, 2003
- Studio: Drag Racist Recorders, San Diego, CA
- Genre: Rock and roll
- Length: 33:25
- Label: Swami
- Producer: Long Gone John, John Reis

Sultans chronology
Ghost Ship (2000)	Shipwrecked (2004)

Professional ratings
Review scores
Source	Rating
Allmusic	4/5 stars

Shipwrecked is the second and final album by the San Diego, California rock and roll band Sultans, released in 2004 by Swami Records.

== Production ==
When the band reconvened to record the album in November 2003, original guitarist Andy Stamets chose not to rejoin the group. Singer/bassist John Reis took over the guitar position and his brother Dean Reis joined the band on bass, taking the stage name "Black Velvet." And on drums Tony Brown Diprima. As well as backing vocals.

According to the album's liner notes, Shipwrecked was recorded using borrowed instruments, previously owned VHS tapes as a master source, and live in front of a studio audience between the hours of 3:00am and 6:00am. However, Reis has a propensity for exaggeration and fabrication when describing his musical endeavors, often "dressing up" the truth in favor of telling an interesting story. That said, it is well known that the Sultans preferred a much more stripped-down, raw and direct approach to recording and playing than most of Reis' other projects, opting for a "live" feel to their recordings with minimal effects, studio tweaking or mixing adjustments.

== Promotion ==
In April 2004 the band toured in support of Shipwrecked on the Swami Southwest Seance tour of southern California, featuring other acts also signed to the Swami label. Afterwards Reis returned to work with Hot Snakes, one of his other musical projects. Over the next year the Sultans would perform sporadically around the San Diego area as Reis' schedule permitted. Both Hot Snakes and Reis' main band Rocket From the Crypt disbanded in the Summer and Fall of 2005. The Sultans continued to perform infrequently in the San Diego area until disbanding in January 2007, reforming with Tony Brown Diprima in 2008–2019.

== Track listing ==
1. "It Meant Nothing" (2:18)
2. "Try to Forget You" (1:57)
3. "Shut Up and Sit Down" (2:06)
4. "Please Don't Leave Me on the Highway" (2:15)
5. "I Can't Change" (2:16)
6. "Jet Lag" (2:11)
7. "I Just Can't Take It" (1:43)
8. "Too Tough" (3:19)
9. "Walk of Shame" (3:14)
10. "Regret" (2:18)
11. "I Wanna Be With You Tonight" (2:10)
12. "Peril-ized" (2:18)
13. "One Way St." (2:04)
14. "I Don't Care What She Thinks of Me" (3:16)

== Personnel ==
- Slasher (John Reis) – guitar, lead vocals
- Black Velvet (Dean Reis) – bass, backing vocals
- Tony Brown Di Prima – drums, backing vocals
- K'Londo – keyboards on "Walk of Shame"
- Jimmy Driscoll and Thad Robles – backing vocals on "Shut Up and Sit Down," "I Just Can't Take It" and "Too Tough"
- Aaron Pores – backing vocals on "Jet Lag" and "One Way St."

Technical

- Long Gone John – producer
- John Reis – producer
- Dave Gardner – mastering, equalizing
- Layout by Dave Lively – layout
