= The Heartaches =

American doo-wop musical group 1962–1989

- Origin: Jersey City, New Jersey
- Genres: Doo-wop, a cappella
- Years active: 1962–1989
- Labels: Catamount Records; Sky Disc Records
- Past members: Joe Calamito (1962-1989); Tom D'Alessandro (1962-1989); Russ Capo (1962); Louis Francischini (1962); Charles Romano (1962-?); Joanne Lucas (1963-1967); Robert Taglierini (1963-?); Gerri O'Neil (1967-?); Joanne Bevagua (1967-?); Raul Vicente (1981-1989); Phil Granito (1981-1989)

The Heartaches were an American Doo-wop musical group from Jersey City, New Jersey. The group formed in 1962 and disbanded in 1989.

== History ==
=== The Vydells ===
The group began singing in 1962 in Jersey City, New Jersey as The Vydells and consisted of Joe Calamito, Tom D'Alessandro, Russ Capo, Louis Francischini and Charles Romano, who ranged from 13 to 15 years old. As they gained popularity, they became part of WMCA disc jockeys Toby Clare and Jack Spector's record hop dances, opening for acts like The Broadways, The Duprees, The McCoys, Randy & the Rainbows, Ronnie and the Highlights, and Lenny Welsh.

=== Joanne and the Heartaches ===
In 1963 the group reformed, adding lead vocalist Joanne Lucas and first tenor Robert Taglierini, who replaced Russ Capo. Retaining founding members Joe Calamito, Tom D'Alessandro and Charles Romano the group then became known as Joanne and the Heartaches recording for Catamount Records, an early a cappella record label. Joanne and the Heartaches were scheduled to sign with Roulette Records in the summer of 1966 but were knocked out by the British Invasion.

Joanne and the Heartaches performed from 1963 to 1967 and after lead singer Joanne Lucas left, Gerri O'Neil became lead singer and a second female voice was added- Joanne Bevacgua. This new 5 person group consisting of Geri O'Neil, Joanne Bevacqua, Joe Calamito, Tommy D'alessandro and Charlie Romano; two females, and three males (a rare combination for the time ) recorded for both the Catamaount Label and Sky Disc Records.

In the 1970s Catamount Records released The Heartaches - Lampost Love Songs, an a cappella album. Which featured both the original singer Joanne Lucas and Geri O'Neil.

=== The Heartaches ===
The group refrained from live performances in the later 1970s, resurfacing in 1981 as The Heartaches with founding members Joe Calamito and Tom D'Alessandro, adding Raul Vicente and Phil Granito, and dropping the female lead. This four-man vocal group sang with the aid of a guitar and coined the phrase "Rockapella" for their unique sound. In a 1981 article in Aquarian Magazine, writer Rich Lee notes that The Heartaches were performing what the group called "Rockapella" because of the use of the four voices and one guitar.

In 1983 they won the first ever vocal contest by Doo-wop concert promoter Richard Nader and won the right to appear at Madison Garden for two shows at Richard Nader's November 1983 concert.

The Heartaches of the 1980s were moderately commercially successful. They worked as an opening act, contributed to a children's album The Pickle That Ate Chicago, sang backup on a Sassoon jeans commercial, sang backup were back-up singers on the British hit "It's Not Over" by the artist Choppers, and performed with country singer-songwriter Jan Chamberlin. The Heartaches were signed to a one-year production contract with RCA Records in 1985, but were dropped at the end of that year. The Heartaches performed until 1989 and then disbanded.

== Discography ==
- "I'm So Young" b/w "A Lover's Call" (Catamount, 1966)
- Lamp Post Love Songs (Catamount LP-906)
