= Pitchfork (band) =

American post-hardcore band (1986–1990)

- Origin: San Diego, California, U.S.
- Genres: Post-hardcore, indie rock
- Years active: 1986–1990
- Labels: Nemesis, Swami
- Past members: Rick Froberg; John Reis; Don Ankrom; Joey Piro; Nick Frederick
- Website: Swamirecords.com

Pitchfork was an American post-hardcore band formed in 1986 in San Diego, California, and disbanded in 1990. They are most well known as the first "real" band (after high school effort Conservative Itch/Coitus Interruptus) of guitarist John Reis, who would later gain fame as the frontman in Rocket from the Crypt, and as the first collaboration between Reis and singer Rick Froberg (the two would later form Drive Like Jehu and Hot Snakes). As an aspiring visual artist and illustrator, Froberg provided most of the band's artwork while Reis developed his studio skills by acting as producer on their records.

== Band history ==
Pitchfork formed in 1986 in San Diego. The initial lineup consisted of John Reis on guitar and piano, Don Ankrom on bass and Joey Piro on drums. Rick Froberg (who would sometimes use the stage name Rick Farr or Rick Fork) soon joined on vocals. Their musical influences included Mission of Burma, Sonic Youth and others. In 1988 they recorded their first and only vinyl 7", Saturn Outhouse, consisting of three songs and released the following year.

In 1989 Ankrom left the band and was replaced by Nick Frederick. They entered Radio Tokyo studios and recorded their only album, Eucalyptus, which was released the following year on local label Nemesis Records. Froberg provided artwork for the album while Reis acted as producer. The band broke up shortly thereafter.

Following the breakup of Pitchfork Reis and Froberg formed Drive Like Jehu, in which they performed until 1995. Reis simultaneously formed Rocket from the Crypt, which he performed in until 2005. During the 1990s he also released a solo effort under the name Back Off Cupids, and from 2000-2007 performed in the Sultans. From 1999-2005 Reis and Froberg again reunited as the Hot Snakes.

In 2003 Reis re-released Eucalyptus and Saturn Outhouse as a single CD through his record label Swami Records.

After Froberg joined Obits from 2006 to 2015, Reis formed The Night Marchers in 2007. The Hot Snakes now continue after a 2011 reunion.

== Band members ==
- Rick Froberg (aka Rick Farr, Rick Fork) – vocals
- John Reis – guitar, piano
- Don Ankrom – bass (1986–1989)
- Nick Frederick – bass (1989–1990)
- Joey Piro – drums

== Discography ==
=== Albums ===
Year	Title	Label	Other information
1990	Eucalyptus	Nemesis	The band's only full-length album. The Nemesis release is out of print. In 2003 the album was re-released by Swami Records as a CD with the songs from Saturn Outhouse as bonus tracks. This version is sometimes labeled Eucalyptus + Saturn Outhouse.

=== EPs ===
Year	Title	Label	Other information
1989	Saturn Outhouse	Nemesis	Out of print. 3 songs, all re-released on Swami Records CD version of Eucalyptus.
