= Jericho Sirens =

Studio album by Hot Snakes
- Released: March 16, 2018
- Genre: Post-hardcore
- Length: 30:01
- Label: Sub Pop

Hot Snakes chronology
Audit in Progress (2004)	Jericho Sirens (2018)

Professional ratings
Aggregate scores
Source	Rating
AnyDecentMusic?	8.3/10
Metacritic	86/100
Review scores
Source	Rating
AllMusic	4/5 stars
The A.V. Club	A−
DIY	4/5 stars
Exclaim!	9/10
Kerrang!	4/5
Mojo	4/5 stars
Pitchfork	7.7/10
Q	4/5 stars
Record Collector	4/5 stars
The Skinny	5/5 stars

Jericho Sirens is the fourth studio album by American post-hardcore band Hot Snakes. It was released in March 2018 under Sub Pop.

The album was included in Mondo Sonoro's best albums of 2018 year-end list, ranking at #26.

== Track listing ==
No.	Title	Length
1.	"I Need a Doctor"	2:49
2.	"Candid Cameras"	2:11
3.	"Why Don't It Sink In?"	1:17
4.	"Six Wave Hold-Down"	3:23
5.	"Jericho Sirens"	3:58
6.	"Death Camp Fantasy"	2:36
7.	"Having Another?"	3:31
8.	"Death Doula"	3:49
9.	"Psychoactive"	3:06
10.	"Death of a Sportsman"	3:21
