= Sultans (band) =

American rock and roll band

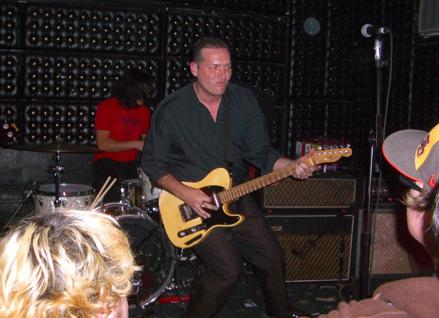
- The Sultans at their performance, January 10, 2007, showing Mario Rubalcaba (left) and John Reis (right). Dean Reis is not pictured.

Background information
- Origin: San Diego, California, U.S.
- Genre: Rock and roll
- Years active: 2000–2019
- Label: Swami
- Spinoff of: Drive Like Jehu, Rocket from the Crypt
- Past members: Slasher; Black Flame; Tony Brown Di Prima; Black Velvet; Mario Rubalcaba
- Website: Swamirecords.com

The Sultans were an American rock and roll band led by John Reis, formed in 2000 in San Diego, California. Over the course of the band's lifespan they released two full-length albums on Reis' Swami Records label. The band took pride in their "stripped down" rock and roll approach, using a simple guitar/bass/drum structure and recording quickly using pre-used equipment and borrowed instruments in order to maintain a loose, spontaneous feel.

== Band history ==
=== Formation ===
Sultans essentially began as a "side project" in 2000 while Reis was taking time off from his main band Rocket from the Crypt, who were in between record labels and had lost their longtime drummer Atom Willard. While searching for a new record label and drummer, Reis started his own label Swami Records and experimented with other musicians, resulting in the formation of both the Sultans and Hot Snakes. Sultans resulted from his collaboration with drummer Tony Di Prima. Bringing in Rocket from the Crypt guitarist Andy Stamets, Reis took up the bass guitar and the band recorded an introductory EP and the album Ghost Ship, both of which were released that year on the Swami label. As Reis has a tradition of using different stage names or pseudonyms in his various projects, he chose to perform as "Slasher" in the Sultans, while Stamets performed as "Black Flame."

Touring in support of Ghost Ship was limited due to the members' commitments to their other bands. They were able to play several shows in the San Diego area. Reis also toured sporadically with Hot Snakes at this time before he and Stamets resumed working full-time with Rocket from the Crypt.

=== Lineup change ===
In November 2003 Reis and Di Prima reconvened to work on another Sultans album, but Stamets chose not to rejoin the group. Reis took over the guitar position and his younger brother Dean Reis was brought in to play bass, taking the stage name "Black Velvet." This lineup recorded the album Shipwrecked, released in early 2004 on Swami Records. That April the band embarked on the Swami Southwest Seance tour of southern California, featuring other acts also signed to the Swami label. Afterwards John Reis returned to work with Hot Snakes. Over the next year the Sultans would perform sporadically around the San Diego area as Reis' schedule permitted.

=== Demise ===
In mid to late 2005 both Hot Snakes and Rocket from the Crypt played their final shows. The breakups of these groups left the Sultans as John Reis' only active band. He devoted himself to running Swami Records, which released several albums by San Diego–area rock bands. In January 2006 the Sultans toured four cities as part of "The Swami California Field Trip," with Rocket from the Crypt/Hot Snakes drummer Mario Rubalcaba replacing Di Prima, who had left the group. The band performed infrequently throughout the rest of the year.

On January 10, 2007, the Sultans played their final performance with Mario Rubacaba at the San Diego rock club the Casbah. The event was organized as a benefit for the San Diego–based video production company Fourth Project, who had been working on DVD releases for several of Reis' bands when most of their offices were destroyed by a fire. Reis had announced prior to the show that this would mark the end of the Sultans as an active band, although he would not rule out the possibility of them ever performing together again. Following the band's breakup Reis has taken a break from performing, focusing his energy on running Swami Records, building a recording studio, and taking care of his new child. He has indicated that he will return to music in the near future. Dean Reis, meanwhile, performs with The Heartaches, while Rubalcaba plays in Earthless and is part-owner of the independent record store Thirsty Moon Records in the Hillcrest area of San Diego. Dean Reis and Mario Rubalcaba also play in the band Spider Fever along with Cody Young of The Widows and Billy Baggins of The Heartaches.

On October 31, 2010, the Sultans played a reunion show at Bar Pink, a San Diego bar co-owned by John Reis, with a lineup of John Reis, Dean Reis, Andy Stamets, and Tony DiPrima.

== Band members ==
Sultans lineups (only official members listed)
(2000 – 2003) Sultans Ghost Ship	Slasher – bass, vocals; Black Flame – guitar; Tony Di Prima – drums
(2003 – 2019) Shipwrecked	Slasher – guitar, vocals; Black Velvet – bass; Tony Di Prima – drums
(2006 – 2007) live shows only	Slasher – guitar, vocals; Black Velvet – bass; Mario Rubalcaba – drums

- Slasher (John Reis) – lead vocals (2000–2007), (2008-2019); bass (2000–2003); guitar (2003–2007), (2008-2019)
- Black Flame (Andy Stamets) – guitar, backing vocals (2000–2003)
- Black Velvet (Dean Reis) – bass, backing vocals (2003–2007), (2008-2019)
- Tony Di Prima – drums, backing vocals (2000–2006), (2008-2019)
- Mario Rubalcaba – drums (2006–2007)

== Discography ==
=== Albums ===
Year	Title	Label
2000	Ghost Ship	Swami
2004	Shipwrecked	Swami

=== EPs ===
Year	Title	Label
2000	Sultans	Swami Records

=== Non-album tracks ===
Year	Album/Source	Label	Song(s)	Other information
2003	Swami Sound System Vol. 1	Swami	"Whine, Cry, Bitch, Moan and Complain"	
2004	Swami Southwest Seance 7"	Swami	"Empty Hole"	7" record released in support of the April 2004 Swami Southwest Seance tour featuring bands from the Swami label.
