= Hot Snakes =

American rock band

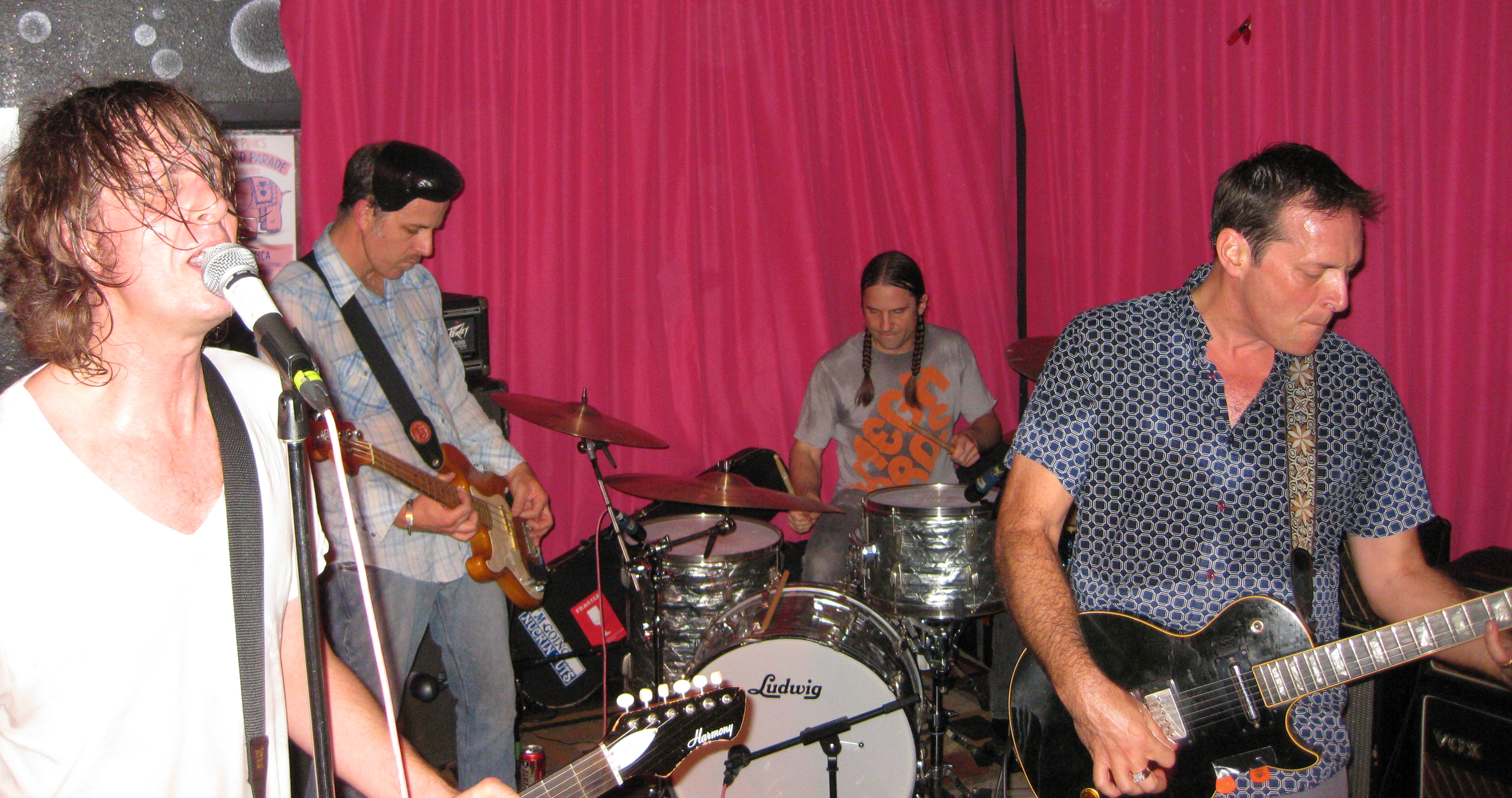
- Left to right: Froberg, Wood, Kourkounis, and Reis in 2011

Background information
- Origin: San Diego, California, U.S.
- Genres: Post-hardcore; indie rock; garage punk
- Years active: 1999–2005; 2011–2023
- Labels: Swami; Sub Pop
- Spinoff of: Pitchfork; Drive Like Jehu; Rocket from the Crypt
- Past members: Rick Froberg; John Reis; Gar Wood; Jason Kourkounis; Mario Rubalcaba
- Website: hotsnakes.com

Hot Snakes were an American rock band led by Rick Froberg and John Reis, formed in 1999 in San Diego, California. Reis and Froberg had previously performed together in Pitchfork and Drive Like Jehu, after which Reis found international success with Rocket from the Crypt. Hot Snakes disbanded in 2005 but reunited in 2011, remaining active until Froberg's death in 2023.

Although they shared musical similarities with members' previous outfits, Hot Snakes forged a sound that was much more primal than that of Pitchfork, Drive Like Jehu or Rocket from the Crypt. Reis and Froberg were also heavily influenced by bands such as The Wipers, Suicide, and the Michael Yonkers Band, with these influences giving Hot Snakes a distinctive sound that has been described by PunkNews as "hardcore garage punk." The band's recordings and merchandise were produced using principles of DIY, with Froberg providing all of the artwork and Reis releasing the material via his Swami Records label.

== History ==
=== 1999–2001: Formation and Automatic Midnight ===
As youths growing up in San Diego, Reis and Froberg had played together in the post-hardcore band Pitchfork from 1986 to 1990. Following that they formed Drive Like Jehu, which gained the attention of major labels and resulted in a record contract with Interscope Records. By this time, however, Reis had become seriously involved with his other band, Rocket from the Crypt, and in 1995 Drive Like Jehu stopped playing together. Reis would continue to work with Rocket From the Crypt until 2005, while Froberg moved to New York to start a career as visual artist and illustrator.

Hot Snakes essentially began as a "side project" in 1999 while Reis was taking time off from Rocket from the Crypt, who were in between record labels and had lost their longtime drummer Atom Willard. While searching for a new record label and drummer, Reis started his own label Swami Records and experimented with other musicians, resulting in the formation of both Hot Snakes and the Sultans. Hot Snakes originated when Reis recorded a batch of songs with The Delta 72 drummer Jason Kourkounis, then contacted former bandmate Froberg to contribute vocals to the tracks. Most of this recording session was released in 2000 as Hot Snakes' first album Automatic Midnight, which was the first release by the Swami label.

Although Reis and Froberg had previously collaborated in bands, Hot Snakes represented a new challenge logistically: Reis lived in San Diego, Froberg in New York, and Kourkounis in Philadelphia. This resulted in sporadic and intense touring and recording schedules. When a full touring band was needed, Gar Wood (Beehive and the Baracudas, Tanner, Fishwife) was called in to play the bass guitar. After some touring Reis returned to work full-time with Rocket from the Crypt.

=== 2002–2004: Suicide Invoice and Audit in Progress ===
In 2002 Hot Snakes reconvened to record the album Suicide Invoice and tour the United States. The following year Kourkounis left the band to play full-time with Burning Brides, and Reis once again returned to work with Rocket from the Crypt. When Hot Snakes again returned to the recording studio in 2004, Rocket from the Crypt drummer Mario Rubalcaba (also of The Black Heart Procession, Clikatat Ikatowi, Earthless, 411, and Chicanochrist) was brought in to play the drums. The album Audit in Progress was released and the band extensively toured the United States, as well as Europe and Australia.

While on tour in the United Kingdom that fall, the band recorded several songs for BBC radio at British DJ John Peel's recording studio. Their performance would be one of the last for Peel's program, as he died shortly afterwards. This session was released as the Peel Sessions EP, which replaced a planned single for the song "Braintrust" in the UK market.

=== 2005–2006: Breakup and Thunder Down Under ===
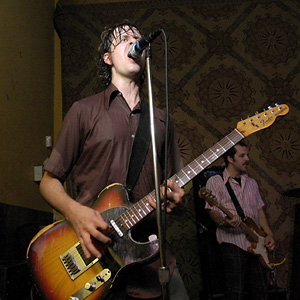
Hot Snakes in Philadelphia in 2005: Froberg (center) and Wood (right)

In May 2005, while on tour in Australia, Hot Snakes recorded a live in-studio performance at ABC studios for Australian radio station triple j. On their return to the US, Reis announced that the band was breaking up. Audit in Progress was named "best punk album" at the 2005 San Diego Music Awards, and shortly after Reis announced that Rocket from the Crypt would also be breaking up. That fall, Hot Snakes contributed a cover of the Government Issue song "Time to Escape" to the soundtrack to the Tony Hawk's American Wasteland video game. This was the last song recorded by the band. Their live Australian radio session was released posthumously in 2006 as Thunder Down Under.

Following the breakup of both Hot Snakes and Rocket from the Crypt, Reis focused his energy on running the Swami Records label. He continued to perform occasionally with Rubalcaba in the Sultans until that band's breakup in January 2007. Rubalcaba also plays in the San Diego band Earthless and is part owner of an independent record store called Thirsty Moon Records. Wood continues to record music and play in Beehive and the Barracudas, while Froberg resides in New York and works as a visual artist and illustrator. In early 2008 Froberg debuted a new musical act called Obits, while Reis, Wood, and Kourkounis reunited in The Night Marchers.

=== 2010–2023: Reunion and Froberg's death ===
On July 29, 2010 The Night Marchers and Obits performed together at The Casbah in San Diego; for the encore, the original Hot Snakes lineup of Reis, Froberg, Wood, and Kourkounis reunited to perform "If Credit's What Matters I'll Take Credit", "Automatic Midnight", and "No Hands". The following year Hot Snakes reunited, with Kourkounis and Rubalcaba taking turns on drums, for a series of gigs including All Tomorrow's Parties and Fun Fun Fun Fest. The band toured the West Coast of the United States from March to April 2012, and performed at the Metallica-curated Orion Music + More festival in New Jersey in June.

On August 14, 2017, Hot Snakes announced a fall tour starting in November as well as new album tentatively scheduled for release in spring 2018 via Sub Pop. Hot Snakes' discography was also subsequently reissued by Sub Pop. As promised, Jericho Sirens was released in 2018 to positive reviews.

In June 2023, Froberg revealed on Instagram that a fifth Hot Snakes record was "very near done". Froberg died two weeks later on June 30, 2023, at the age of 55.

== Band members ==
Hot Snakes lineups
1999–2003 Automatic Midnight Suicide Invoice	Rick Froberg – lead vocals, guitar; John Reis – guitar, backing vocals; Gar Wood – bass, backing vocals; Jason Kourkounis – drums
2003–05 Audit in Progress Peel Sessions Thunder Down Under	Rick Froberg – lead vocals, guitar; John Reis – guitar, backing vocals; Gar Wood – bass, backing vocals; Mario Rubalcaba – drums
2011–2023 Jericho Sirens	Rick Froberg – lead vocals, guitar; John Reis – guitar, backing vocals; Gar Wood – bass, backing vocals; Jason Kourkounis – drums; Mario Rubalcaba – drums

- Rick Froberg – lead vocals, guitar (1999–2005, 2011–2023; his death)
- John Reis – guitar, backing vocals (1999–2005, 2011–2023)
- Gar Wood – bass, backing vocals (1999–2005, 2011–2023)
- Jason Kourkounis – drums (1999–2003, 2011–2023)
- Mario Rubalcaba – drums (2003–2005, 2011–2023)

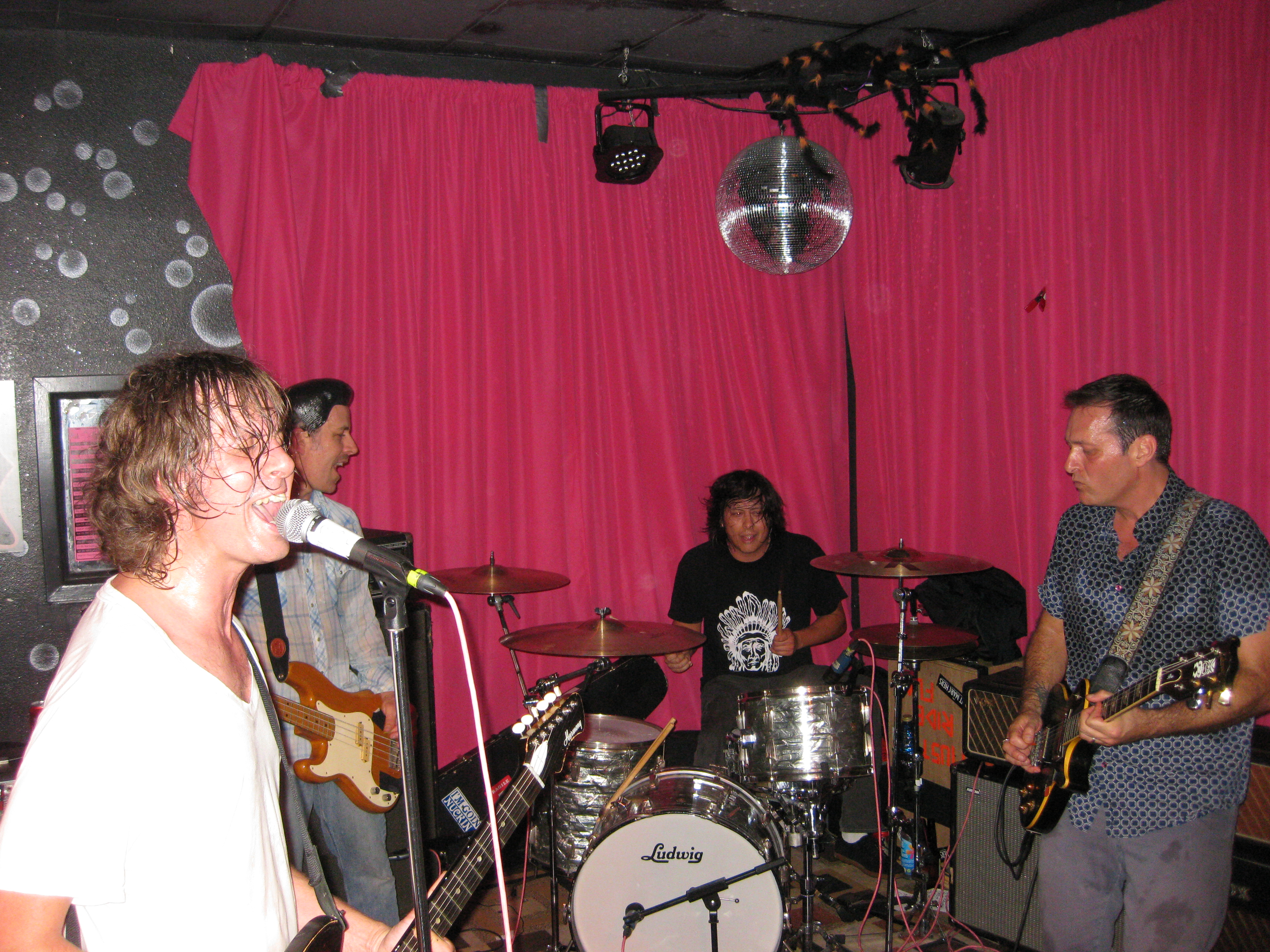
Left to right: Froberg, Wood, Rubalcaba, and Reis in 2011

== Discography ==
Hot Snakes discography
- Studio albums: 4
- Extended plays: 1
- Live albums: 1
- Singles: 6
- Music videos: 3
- Other appearances: 2

Hot Snakes' discography consists of four studio albums, one live album, one EP, six singles, and three music videos.

=== Studio albums ===
Year	Album details
2000	Automatic Midnight: Released: February 15, 2000; Label: Swami; Format: LP, CD
2002	Suicide Invoice: Released: June 11, 2002; Label: Swami; Format: LP, CD
2004	Audit in Progress: Released: October 5, 2004; Label: Swami; Format: LP, CD
2018	Jericho Sirens: Released: March 16, 2018; Label: Sub Pop; Format: LP, CD

=== Live albums ===
Year	Album details
2006	Thunder Down Under: Released: August 15, 2006; Label: Swami; Format: LP, CD

=== Extended plays ===
Year	Album details
2005	Peel Sessions: Released: April 26, 2005; Label: Swami; Format: EP, CD

=== Singles ===
Year	Single	Album
2004	"This Mystic Decade"	Audit in Progress
2011	"DNR (Do Not Resuscitate)" b/w "Time to Escape"	N/A
2018	"Six Wave Hold-Down"	Jericho Sirens
2018	"Death Camp Fantasy"	Jericho Sirens
2019	"Checkmate"	N/A
2020	"I Shall Be Free"	N/A

=== Music videos ===
Year	Song	Director	Album
2004	"Braintrust"		Audit in Progress
2019	"Checkmate"		
2020	"I Shall Be Free"		

=== Other appearances ===
The following Hot Snakes songs were released on compilation albums. This is not an exhaustive list; songs that were first released on the band's albums are not included.

Year	Release details	Track
2003	Swami Sound System Vol. 1: Released: April 29, 2003; Label: Swami; Format: CD	"U.S. Mint"
2005	Tony Hawk's American Wasteland soundtrack: Released: October 18, 2005; Label: Vagrant	"Time to Escape" (originally performed by Government Issue)
