= Jimmy Lovelace =

American jazz drummer (1940–2004)

- Born: James Ross Lovelace; February 6, 1940; Kansas City, Missouri, U.S.
- Died: October 29, 2004 (aged 64) Manhattan, New York
- Genres: Jazz
- Occupation: Musician
- Instrument: Drums

James Ross Lovelace (February 6, 1940 – October 29, 2004) was an American jazz drummer.

== Biography ==
He was born in Kansas City, Missouri. By the early 1960s, he had begun performing in jazz clubs in New York City. From the mid-1960s to the 1980s, he was a session musician on albums by performers such as Junior Mance, Tony Scott, George Benson, and Wes Montgomery, with whom he also played regularly. In 1967 he played on the debut album by singer-songwriter Leonard Cohen.

In later years, he regularly played at Smalls Jazz Club in West Village, with pianist Frank Hewitt, and as a member of the band Across 7 Street, that also featured Sacha Perry (piano),Chris Byars (saxophone), and Ari Roland (bass). They released an album, The Eternal Pyramid, in 2004.

He died from pancreatic cancer in Manhattan in 2004, at the age of 64.

== Playing style ==
Pianist Brad Mehldau described playing with Lovelace: "He had a swing that was right down the middle — maybe comparable to Art Taylor, but all his own. Whereas Jimmy Cobb and others had pulled me, Lovelace held me in place with his beat, gently but absolutely."
