= Yeghiazaryan =

Yeghiazaryan (Armenian: Եղիազարյան), also transliterated as Yegiazaryan and Egiazaryan, is an Armenian surname, from the personal name Yeghiazar (Armenian form of Lazarus or Eleazar).

Notable people with the surname include:

- Anush Yeghiazaryan (born 1965), artist
- Armen Yeghiazaryan (born 1980), politician
- Ashot Yeghiazaryan (1943–2016), politician
- Ashot Egiazaryan (born 1965), politician and businessman
- Boris Yeghiazaryan (born 1956), Armenian artist uk:Єгіазарян Борис
- Grigor Yeghiazaryan (1908–1988), composer
- Gurgen Egiazaryan (1948–2020), politician and civil servant
- Hayk Yeghiazaryan (born 1972), weightlifter
- Karapet Yeghiazaryan (1932–2006), painter
- Lucy Yeghiazaryan (born 1991), vocalist and violinist
- Vachik Yeghiazaryan (born 1991), wrestler
