= Across 7 Street =

American jazz group

Across 7 Street (also spelled Across 7th Street) was an American jazz group co-led by Ari Roland and Chris Byars. The group played Sunday nights at Smalls Jazz Club for nine years until the original club's closure in 2003, and also played at the University of the Streets. The band was formed after the death of saxophonist C. Sharpe. Its name was in reference to the University of the Streets, where Sharpe taught, being on the other side of East 7th Street in Manhattan from the Peter Jarema Funeral Home, where he was buried. It played music based in traditional bebop. The band was featured in the Impulse! Records compilation Jazz Underground: Live at Smalls, and recorded the album Made In New York. On September 28, 2004, tracks recorded by the band in 2001 were released under the title The Eternal Triangle for digital download, in a bid to raise money for drummer Jimmy Lovelace's cancer treatment.

== Members ==
As recorded on Jazz Underground: Live at Smalls, sometime between July 3 and July 6, 1997

  - Joe Magnarelli – trumpet
  - John Mosca – trombone
  - Zaid Nasser – alto saxophone
  - Chris Byars – tenor saxophone
  - Sacha Perry – piano
  - Ari Roland – double bass
  - Jimmy Lovelace – drums

As recorded on The Eternal Triangle, 2001

  - Chris Byars – tenor saxophone
  - John Mosca – trombone
  - Sacha Perry – piano
  - Ari Roland – double bass
  - Jimmy Lovelace – drums

As recorded on Made in New York, May 16, 2002

  - Chris Byars – tenor saxophone
  - John Mosca – trombone
  - Sacha Perry – piano
  - Ari Roland – double bass
  - Danny Rosenfeld – drums

== Made in New York ==
Made in New York

Studio album by Across 7 Street
- Released: February 3, 2004
- Recorded: May 16, 2002
- Studio: The Studio, SoHo, New York
- Genre: Jazz
- Length: 1:02:18
- Label: Smalls Records
- Producer: Luke Kaven

Made in New York is the only album by the American jazz group Across 7 Street. It features twelve of the original compositions the group played during its residency in Smalls Jazz Club.

=== Critical reception ===
Professional ratings
Review scores
| Source | Rating |
|---|---|
| Allmusic | 3/5 stars |
| Tom Hull | B- |

=== Track listing ===
1. You Think So! (Perry) – 4:40
2. Having Tea with Swamp Thing (Roland) – 5:19
3. Apollo 7 (Byars) – 4:04
4. St. Francis' Dimes (Roland) – 5:48
5. Sundial (Byars) – 4:56
6. We'll See (Roland) – 4:51
7. Back in the Cosmos (Byars) – 6:52
8. One for D.T. (Roland) – 7:03
9. Need I Say More? (Perry) – 4:18
10. Eleven Later (Roland) – 4:05
11. Adriatic Sea (Byars) – 4:57
12. Once (Roland) – 5:27
