= Sketches from a Bassist's Album =

Studio album by Ari Roland
- Released: March 14, 2006
- Recorded: August 5, 2005
- Studio: Zebulon Sound And Light, New York City
- Genre: Jazz
- Label: Smalls Records
- Producer: Luke Kaven

Sketches from a Bassist's Album is an album by American jazz musician Ari Roland.

== Track listing ==
All tracks are written by Ari Roland except as indicated.

Sketches from a Bassist's Album track listing
No.	Title	Length
1.	"The Lion of Yerevan"	5:52
2.	"Most's Paradise"	6:00
3.	"Replaceable Me"	6:14
4.	"Swamp Thing Goes to the Indy 500"	3:16
5.	"Mensch Blues"	8:06
6.	"Ah, Transcarpathicus"	6:19
7.	"Thou Swell" (Written by Rodgers and Hart)	6:07
8.	"Byars-A-Maki"	5:29
9.	"Mo's On"	4:11
10.	"I'll Walk Alone" (Written by Sammy Cahn and Jule Styne)	6:08

== Critical reception ==
Professional ratings
Review scores
Source	Rating
Allmusic	4.5/5 stars
PopMatters	7/10

AllMusic reviewer Ken Dryden gave the album 4.5 stars out of five, stating that "Ari Roland and his musicians are clearly deserving of wider recognition after this outstanding session." A reviewer for Double Bassist magazine noted that "The music on Sketches certainly has deep roots in bebop, yet is very different from the over-stylised, retro-bop that many other contemporary groups turn out."

== Personnel ==
- Ari Roland – bass
- Chris Byars – tenor saxophone
- Sacha Perry – piano
- Phil Stewart – drums
