= Grant Stewart (musician) =

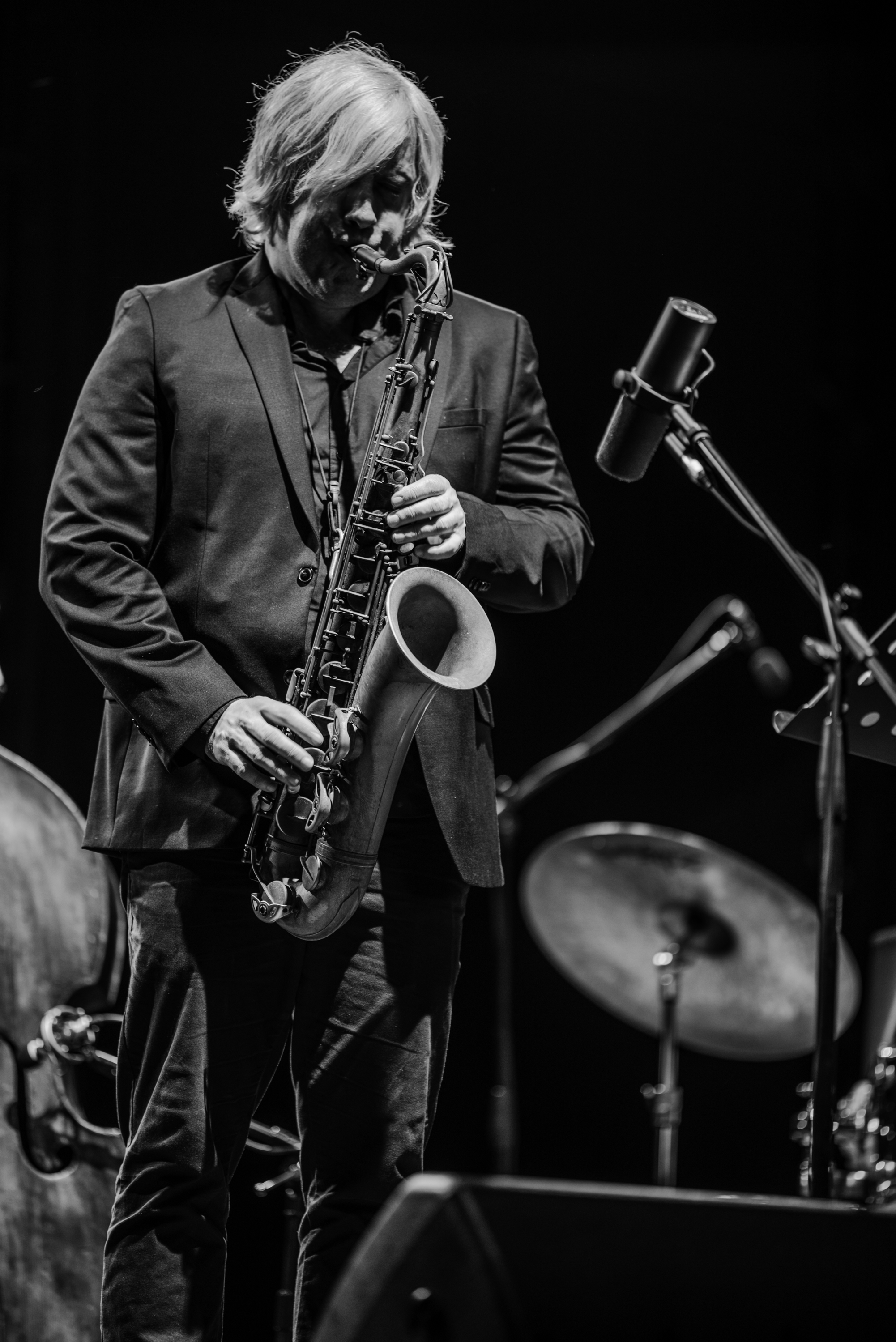

Background information
- Born: June 4, 1971 (age 54); Toronto, Ontario, Canada
- Genres: Jazz
- Occupation: Musician
- Instruments: Tenor sax, soprano sax
- Years active: 1990s–present
- Website: grantstewartjazz.com

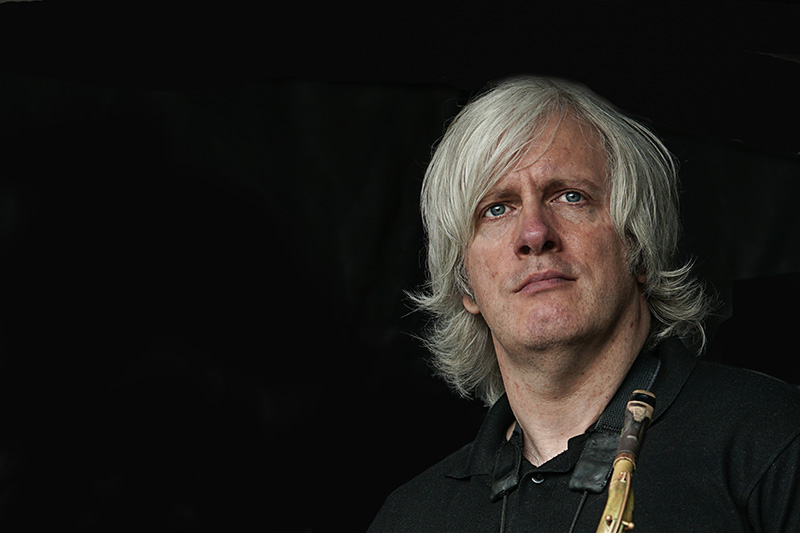
Grant Stewart at Copenhagen Jazz Festival 2018

Grant Stewart (born June 4, 1971) is a Canadian jazz saxophonist.

== Life and career ==
Stewart was born in Toronto, Ontario, on June 4, 1971. His father was a part-time jazz guitarist. At age ten, Stewart played alto sax solos from saxophonists Charlie Parker, Coleman Hawkins, and Wardell Gray that had been transcribed by his father. "By his early teens, Stewart had already found performance experience with such artists as Pat LaBarbera and Bob Mover." By 18 he "was leading a quartet in Toronto, including for a regular gig at C'est What café and pub"; and he moved to New York City when he was 19.

In New York, Stewart first played with guitarist Peter Bernstein and saxophonist Jesse Davis. He then began playing at Smalls Jazz Club when it opened in 1993.

His younger brother, Philip, has been a drummer in Stewart's bands since 2005.

Stewart is the first to have been interviewed for the long-running jazz-interview podcast The Jazz Session when it was created by Jason Crane in 2007.

For his 2007 recording Young at Heart, Stewart chose compositions that included music by Elmo Hope and Neal Hefti, as well as originals.

On Around the Corner in 2010, Stewart also played soprano sax. In 2011, this album was the focus of his second interview by Crane for the 4th-anniversary episode of The Jazz Session.

Stewart married Armenian American jazz singer Lucy Yeghiazaryan in the fall of 2020.

== Playing style ==
Stewart plays "steady swinging, muscular hard bop". His sound is "lean and sinewy, yet flush with lyricism, humor and rhythmic possibilities, much like tenor icons Dexter Gordon and Sonny Rollins, to whom Stewart is frequently compared".

== Discography ==
An asterisk (*) indicates that the year is that of release.

=== As leader/co-leader ===
Year recorded	Title	Label	Personnel/Notes
1992	Downtown Sounds	Criss Cross	Quintet, with Joe Magnarelli (trumpet), Brad Mehldau (piano), Peter Washington (bass), Kenny Washington (drums)
1995	More Urban Tones	Criss Cross	With Peter Bernstein (guitar), Peter Washington (bass), Billy Drummond (drums), Chris Byars (tenor sax), Jay Collins (tenor sax)
1998	Buen Rollo	Fresh Sound New Talent	Trio, with Chris Higgins (bass), Marc Miralta (drums)
2004	Grant Stewart + 4	Criss Cross	Quintet, with Joe Cohn (guitar), Bill Charlap (piano), Paul Gill (bass), Willie Jones III (drums)
2005	Stars Fell on Alabama		Quintet, with Clark Terry (trumpet), Chip Crawford (piano), Ruslin Khain (bass), Sasha Loukachine (drums)
2005	Tenor and Soul	VideoArts	Most tracks quartet, with Joe Cohn (guitar), Ehud Asheire (piano), Joel Stewart (drums); some tracks quintet, with Ryan Kisor (trumpet) added
2005	Estate	VideoArts	With Eric Alexander (tenor saxophone), Joe Cohn (guitar), Ehud Asherie (piano), Joel Forbes (bass), Phil Stewart (drums)
2007*	In the Still of the Night	Sharp Nine	Quartet, with Tardo Hammer (piano), Peter Washington (bass), Joe Farnsworth (drums)
2007	The Shadow of Your Smile	Birds Records	Quartet, with Tardo Hammer (piano), Peter Washington (bass), Joe Farnsworth (drums)
2008	Recado Bossa Nova	Birds Records	
2008	Young at Heart	Sharp Nine	Quartet, with Tardo Hammer (piano), Peter Washington (bass), Joe Farnsworth (drums)
2009	Plays the Music of Duke Ellington and Billy Strayhorn	Sharp Nine	Quartet, with Tardo Hammer (piano), Paul Gill (bass), Joe Farnsworth (drums)
2009	Plays Jazz Ballads	Birds Records	
2010	Around the Corner	Sharp Nine	Quartet, with Peter Bernstein (guitar), Peter Washington (bass), Phil Stewart (drums); Stewart plays soprano sax on some tracks
2010	St. Thomas	Birds Records	
2012	Live at Smalls	Smalls Live	Quartet, with Tardo Hammer (piano), David Wong (bass), Phil Stewart (drums); in concert
2015	Trio Live	Cellar Live	Trio, with Paul Sikivie (bass), Philip Stewart (drums); in concert
2017	Roll On	Cellar Live	
2019	Rise and Shine	Cellar Live	
2022	The Lighting of the Lamps	Cellar Live	

=== As co-leader with Eric Alexander ===
Year recorded	Title	Label	Notes
2005	Reeds and Deeds: Wailin'	Criss Cross	With David Hazeltine (piano), Peter Washington (bass), Kenny Washington (drums)
2006	Reeds and Deeds: Cookin'	Criss Cross	With David Hazeltine (piano), John Webber (bass), Joe Farnsworth (drums)
2010	Reeds and Deeds: Tenor Time	Criss Cross	With David Hazeltine (piano), John Webber (bass), Joe Farnsworth (drums)

=== As co-leader with Fabio Miano ===
Year Recorded	Title	Label
2018	Namely You	DISCMEDI

=== As sideman ===
Year recorded	Leader	Title	Label
2007*	Ehud Asherie	Lockout	Posi-Tone
2008*	John Swana	Bright Moments	Criss Cross

=== Featured ===
Year Recorded	Leader	Title	Label
1997	Michael Melito	My Conception	MHR Records
1998		Jazz Underground: Live at Smalls	GRP Records
2001	Michael Melito	'Bout Time	CD Baby
2002	Yves Brouqui	Live at Smalls	Smalls Live
2003	Ryan Kisor	Awakening	Criss Cross
2004	Paul Hoffman	Topsy Turvy	MHR Records
2004	Ryan Kisor	The Quintet A Night in Tunisia	Video Arts
2005	Sasha Loukachine	The Sasha Loukachine Quartet with Clark Terry Stars Fell on Alabama	CD Baby
2005	John Marshall	Frisky	Organic Music
2005	Michael Melito	The Next Step	CD Baby
2006`	Bob Sneider and Joe Locke	Film Noir Project Fallen Angel	Sons of Sound Recorded Music
2006	Yves Brouqui	Made in France	self released
2006	Ryan Kisor	This is Ryan	Video Arts
2007	Lennie Cuje	Lennie Cuje with Mike Wilner Quartet At Smalls	
2007	Bob Stata	Get This	Ilikai Music
