= Standing on the shoulders of giants (disambiguation) =

Standing on the shoulders of giants is a metaphor.

Standing on the shoulders of giants may also refer to:

- Standing on the Shoulders of Giants (Tribe of Gypsies album), 2000
- Standing on the Shoulder of Giants, a 2000 album by Oasis

== See also ==
- On the Shoulders of Giants (disambiguation)
