= Back Off Cupids (album) =

Studio album by Back Off Cupids
- Released: February 22, 2000
- Recorded: 1994
- Genre: Rock &Roll; Post-punk
- Label: Big Fish Records
- Producer: John Reis

Professional ratings
Review scores
Source	Rating
AllMusic	4/5 stars
Kerrang!	4/5 stars

Back Off Cupids is a solo album by the San Diego, California musician John Reis, released in 2000 by Big Fish Records. "Back Off Cupids" was also the name given by Reis to the musical project. Recording of the album's material took place in 1994, in between sessions with Reis' bands Drive Like Jehu and Rocket From the Crypt, and involved Rocket From the Crypt horn players Jason Crane and Paul O'Beirne. Compared to Reis' other musical projects the music was slower, mostly instrumental, and to a certain degree free-form. The material was shelved for several years until mixing was completed in 1999, and the album was finally released in 2000.

== Reception ==
Ned Raggett of Allmusic gave Back Off Cupids four stars out of five, commenting that "At points the music is almost a complete turnaround from Reis' other work — consider the rumbling, structured speaker hum and sweet, sad aura of 'Can You Hear My Sleep Dog?,' a standout track. Perhaps the most telling thing about the Back Off Cupids is that while at points one can imagine either Reis or Drive Like Jehu's Rick Froberg singing over all the songs instead of just Reis here and there, the tunes still easily stand on their own. There's no better testament to Reis' skill and abilities."

== Track listing ==
1. "Meek Inherits Space"
2. "Rock and Roll"
3. "Now We're Asian"
4. "Can You Hear My Sleep Dog?"
5. "Trivial Pursuit"
6. "Painted Half a Picture"
7. "A Strong Maybe"
8. "I'm Stolen"
9. "The Camel Train"
10. "Plee"

== Performers ==
- Jason Crane - drums on all tracks except "Trivial Pursuit," trumpet on "Trivial Pursuit"
- Paul O'Beirne- saxophone on "Trivial Pursuit"
- John Reis - vocals, guitar, bass guitar, drums on "Trivial Pursuit," all other instrumentation

== Album information ==
- Record label:Big Fish Records
- Recorded in 1994 by Gar Wood in his garage except "A Strong Maybe" recorded by Jeff Crouteau in his warehouse
- Mixed by John Reis at Drag Racist Recorders in 1999 except "Painted Half a Picture" and "A Strong Maybe"
- Mastered by Rafter
- Artwork by Rich Jacobs
- Layout by Margaret Murray
