= Tardo Hammer =

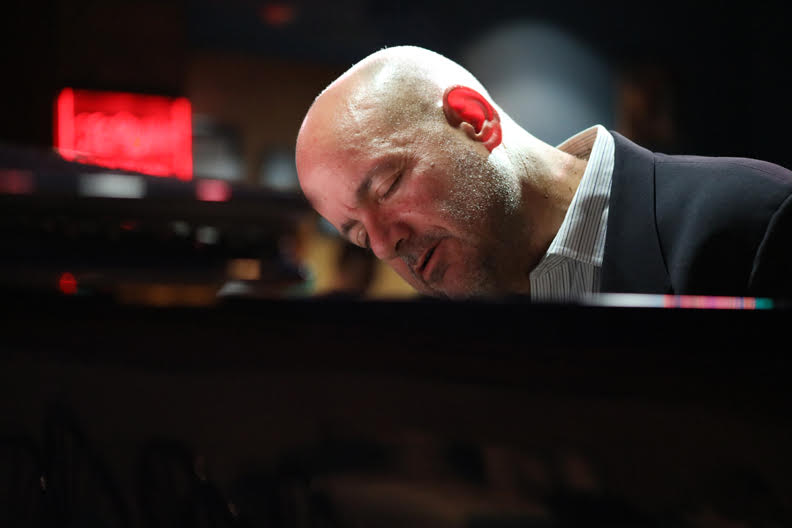

Background information
- Also known as: Tardo Hammer
- Born: Richard Hammer; February 26, 1958 (age 68); New York
- Genres: Jazz
- Instrument: Piano
- Years active: 1970's-present
- Labels: Cellar Live, Sharp Nine
- Website: tardohammer.com

Richard Alan "Tardo" Hammer (born February 26, 1958, New York City) is an American jazz pianist.

Hammer's mother is an amateur pianist. He worked with Richie Vitale in the 1980s and also played with Warne Marsh, Charlie Rouse, Junior Cook, Bill Hardman, Johnny Griffin, Lionel Hampton, Lou Donaldson, and Art Farmer and Clifford Jordan. A member of Bopera House starting in 1986, he shared leader duties in the group with John Marshall after 1988. He played with Vernel Fournier, George Coleman, Gary Bartz, C. Sharpe, Al Cohn, Harold Ashby, and Annie Ross in the 1990s. Long time pianist and musical director for vocalist Annie Ross, has worked with other notable vocalists including David Allyn, Teri Thornton, Abbey Lincoln, Earl Coleman and Marilyn Moore. He appeared on NPR's Piano Jazz with Marian McPartland in 2008. Recordings include trio CDs on Sharp Nine Records and Cellar Live. Still active as performer, sideman and teacher in New York City.

== Discography ==
=== As leader ===
- Bopera House (VSOP, 1988)
- Hammer Time (Sharp Nine Reocrds, 1999)
- Somethin' Special (Sharp Nine Records, 2001)
- Tardo's Tempo (Sharp Nine Records, 2004)
- Look Stop and Listen: The Music of Tadd Dameron (Sharp Nine Records, 2007)
- Simple Pleasure (Cellar Live Records, 2013)
- Swinging on a Star (Cellar Live Records, 2017)
- Right Now! (Jazz Bird Records, 2024)

=== As sideman ===
With John Marshall Quintet

- Dreamin' on the Hudson (Organic Music, 1999)
- Theme of No Repeat (Organic Music, 2000)
- Waltz for Worms (Organic Music, 2010)
- Keep on keepin' on (Mons Records, 2023)

With Grant Stewart

- In the Still of the Night (Sharp Nine Records, 2007)
- Young at Heart (Sharp Nine Records, 2008)
- Plays the Music of Duke Ellington and Billy Strayhorn (Sharp Nine Records, 2009)
- Rise and Shine (Cellar Live Records, 2020)
- Live at Smalls (Cellar Live, 2026)

With Warren Vaché

- Ballads and Other Cautionary Tales (Arbors, 2011)
- Warren Vaché - John Allred Quintet, Top Shelf (Arbors, 2010)
- Jubilation: In Bern at Maria (Arbors, 2008)
- Remembers Benny Carter (Arbors, 2015)

With Richie Vitale

- Dreamsville (TCB Music, 1993)
- Live at Smalls (TCB Music, 1997)
- Shake It (TCB, 2000)

With Others

- Danny D'Imperio & The Metropolitan Bopera House, Formidable (VSOP, 1988)
- Jeff Stambovsky, What Do You Know, Kid? (Hokan Zee, 1998)
- Dave D'Angelo, In a Minute (Double-Time Records, 2000)
- Liz Diamond, Yesterdays (L3 Productions, 2001)
- Annie Ross, Let Me Sing (Consolidated Artists Productions, 2005)
- Amy London, Let's Fly (Motema Music, 2011)
- Ai Murikami, Conception (Gut String Records, 2015)
- Peter & Will Anderson, Clarinet Summit (SteepleChase Lookout, 2017)
