= Back Off Cupids =

- Origin: San Diego, California, U.S.
- Genres: Rock and roll, post punk
- Years active: 1994, 1999
- Label: Drunken Fish
- Past members: John Reis; Jason Crane; Paul O'Beirne

Back Off Cupids was the name of a solo musical project by the San Diego, California musician John Reis. The project took place in 1994, in between sessions with Reis' bands Drive Like Jehu and Rocket from the Crypt. Rocket from the Crypt horn players Jason Crane and Paul O'Beirne were also involved in the project, though the vast majority of the recording was conducted by Reis. Recording took place with friend and fellow musician Gar Wood in his garage.

The music produced by Back Off Cupids was significantly different from Reis' other musical endeavors. While his previous groups had explored genres such as rock and roll, post punk, and post-hardcore in an aggressive fashion, Back Off Cupids was slower, mostly instrumental, and to a certain degree free-form. It most closely resembles Drive Like Jehu in its complexity and intricate song structures, but lacks the aggression and raspy vocals of that group. In a 2000 review, Reed Jackson called the sound "strange, but affecting" and "reeking of noir and adult discomfort".

Recording of the Back Off Cupids material was completed in 1994, but with the exception of a few songs that appeared on compilations it remained mostly unreleased for several years. Reis left the material shelved for the most part, occasionally mixing and tweaking the arrangements in between touring and recording with Rocket from the Crypt. In 1999, during a period in which Rocket from the Crypt were not as active, Reis completed mixing the material and released it as an album through Drunken Fish Records under the title Back Off Cupids.

== Band members ==
- John Reis – vocals, guitar, bass guitar, drums, other instruments
- Jason Crane – drums, trumpet
- Paul O'Beirne – saxophone

== Discography ==
=== Albums ===
Year	Title	Label	Other information
2000	Back Off Cupids	Drunken Fish	Only album. Recorded in 1994, mixed in 1999.

=== Compilation appearances ===
Year	Compilation	Label	Song(s)	Other information
	Ow, Quit It	Volvolo Records	"Painted Half a Picture"	Song re-released on the Back Off Cupids album.
	Saint Doug	no label	"A Strong Maybe"	Compilation of San Diego groups put out by radio station 91X. Song re-released on the Back Off Cupids album.
	Speed Kills	Snap! Crackle Punk!	"Sleds Behave"	This record came with Speed Kills Magazine #7.
