= Photos in Black, White and Gray =

Studio album by Chris Byars
- Released: March 13, 2007
- Recorded: November 2–3, 2007
- Studio: Leon Lee Dorsey Studio
- Genre: Jazz
- Label: Smalls Records
- Producer: Luke Kaven

Chris Byars chronology
| Night Owls (2006) | Photos in Black, White and Gray (2007) | Jazz Pictures At An Exhibition Of Himalayan Art (2008) |

Photos in Black, White and Gray is an album by American jazz saxophonist Chris Byars.

== Content ==
The album features Byars playing the music he played at Smalls Jazz Club in the 90s, taking great inspiration from the bebop era, and specifically the composer-saxophonists Gigi Gryce and Lucky Thompson. On most tracks, the quartet plays the head, then a saxophone solo, piano solo, bowed bass solo, drum solo, and repetition of the head, in that order.

== Critical reception ==
Professional ratings
Review scores
| Source | Rating |
|---|---|
| AllMusic | 4/5 stars |
| Tom Hull | A− |

In a review for AllMusic, Ken Dryden wrote that "Byars displays a mature sound on alto, tenor, and soprano saxes in eight catchy original compositions." Tom Hull wrote that "Byars sounds fresh even working in such a well-worn form." A PopMatters reviewer criticized the "numbing predictability" of the album's soloing pattern, but praised the "bright, easy tone" of Byars' alto saxophone playing. Similarly, a reviewer for Coda magazine stated that Byars alto playing had a "bebop-derived fluidity shot through with melodic loopholes and a rhythmic sensibility that works in short, irregular bursts", and that the album was "an excellent addition to Byars' small but impressive body of recordings".

== Track listing ==
All tracks are written by Chris Byars.

Photos In Black, White And Gray track listing
| No. | Title | Length |
|---|---|---|
| 1. | "Aquarian Epoch" | 8:03 |
| 2. | "Milton" | 7:25 |
| 3. | "Safe at Home" | 7:12 |
| 4. | "Acoustic Phenomenon" | 9:28 |
| 5. | "Manhattan Valley" | 7:49 |
| 6. | "Cliff Diving" | 6:46 |
| 7. | "Riddle of the Sphinx" | 6:38 |
| 8. | "A.T." | 6:35 |

== Personnel ==
- Chris Byars – Alto, tenor, and soprano saxophone
- Sacha Perry – piano
- Ari Roland – bass
- Andy Watson – drums
