= Ehud Asherie =

Israeli jazz pianist and organist

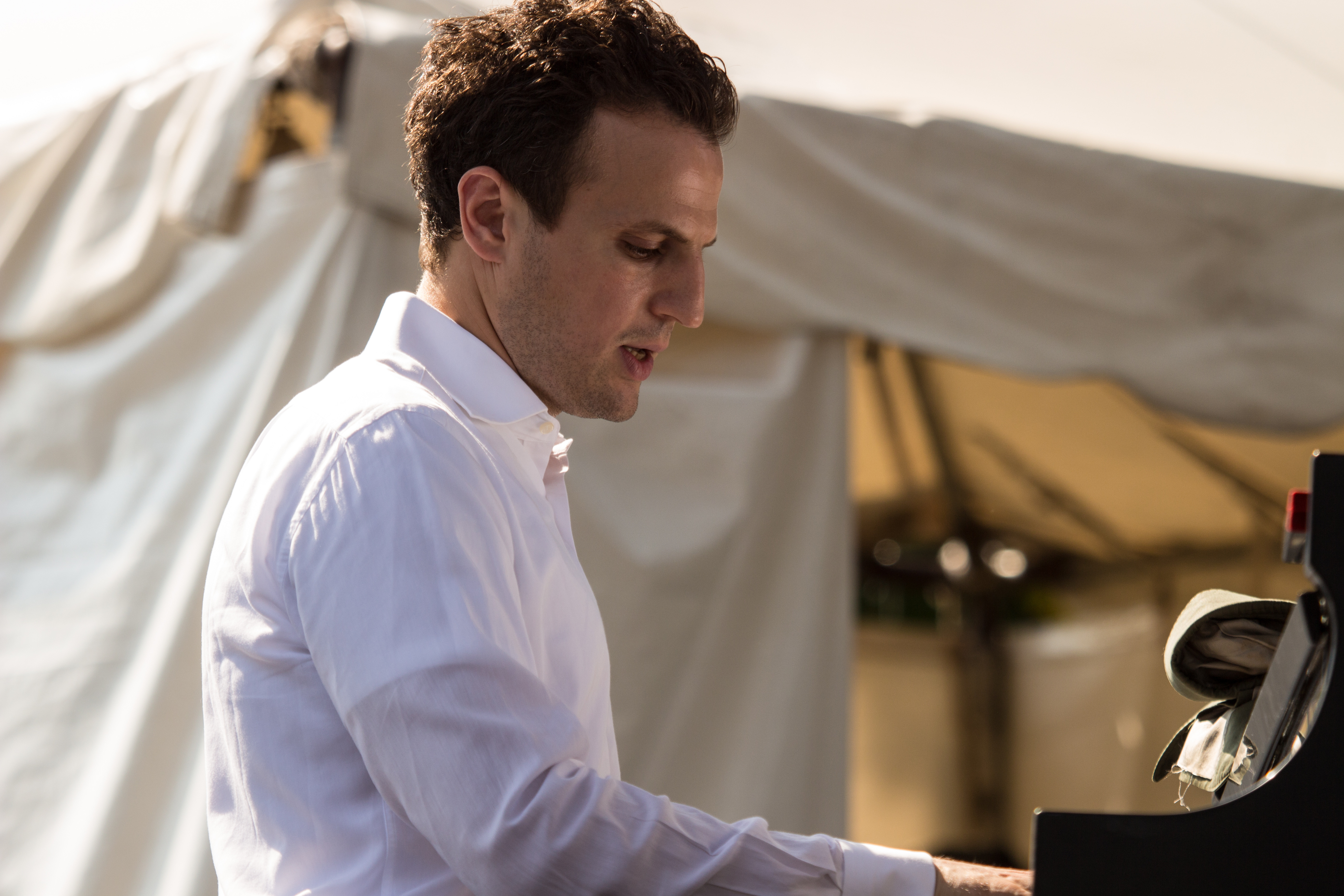
- Ehud Asherie at the Detroit Jazz Festival, 2015

Background information
- Born: 1979 (age 46–47); Israel
- Genres: Jazz
- Occupation: Musician
- Instruments: Piano, Hammond organ
- Years active: 2000s–present
- Labels: Posi-Tone, Arbors

Ehud Asherie (born 1979) is a jazz pianist and organist.

== Early life ==
Asherie was born in Israel in 1979. He moved with his family to Italy at the age of three, where he attended the Sir James Henderson School, now The British School of Milan, and then to the United States when he was nine. As a teenager in New York, he visited Smalls Jazz Club, and took lessons from Frank Hewitt, a pianist who often played there. Asherie first played at Smalls when he was a high school sophomore.

== Later life and career ==
Asherie played Hammond organ on his 2010 quartet release, Organic. He recorded his first solo piano album, Welcome to New York, in 2010.

== Playing style ==
AllMusic's Ken Dryden commented on Asherie's Welcome to New York that "on his earlier CDs he mixed bop, swing, and standards with an occasional taste of stride, but for these solo piano sessions, he focuses more on stride and standards".

== Discography ==
An asterisk (*) indicates that the year is that of release.

=== As leader/co-leader ===
Year recorded	Title	Label	Personnel/Notes
2007	Lockout	Posi-Tone	Quintet, with Grant Stewart (tenor sax), Ryan Kisor (trumpet), Joel Forbes (bass), Phil Stewart (drums)
2007	Swing Set	Posi-Tone	Trio, with Neal Miner (bass), Phil Stewart (drums)
2007	Organic	Posi-Tone	Quartet, with Dmitri Baevsky (sax), Peter Bernstein (guitar), Phil Stewart (drums); released 2010
2009	Modern Life	Posi-Tone	Quartet, with Harry Allen (tenor sax), Joel Forbes (bass), Chuck Riggs (drums); released 2010
2010	Welcome to New York	Arbors	Solo piano
2012*	Upper West Side	Posi-Tone	Duo, with Harry Allen (tenor sax)
2013*	Lower East Side	Posi-Tone	Duo, with Harry Allen (tenor sax)
2016	The Late Set	Anzic	Duo, with Hilary Gardner (vocals)
2019*	Wild Man Blues	Capri	Trio, with Peter Washington (bass), Rodney Green (drums)

=== As sideman ===
Year recorded	Leader	Title	Label
2014*	Bryan Shaw	The Bluebird of Happiness	Arbors
2014*	Hilary Gardner	The Great City	Anzic
2014*	Harry Allen	For George, Cole and Duke	
