= Paul Calderón =

Puerto Rican actor (born 1951 or 1952)

- Born: 1951 or 1952 (age 74–75); Puerto Rico
- Occupation: Actor
- Years active: 1984–present
- Spouse: Catherine Calderón
- Children: 2
- Website: www.paulcalderon.net

Paul Calderón (born 1951 or 1952) is a Puerto Rican actor. He is a founding member of the Touchstone Theatre, the American Folk Theatre and the LAByrinth Theater Company. He is also a member of the Actors Studio, auditioning and accepted as a member in 1984 alongside Melissa Leo and two other actors. He is best known for portraying Raymond Cruz in the 1998 crime comedy film Out of Sight and the 2023 neo-Western crime drama miniseries Justified: City Primeval, Jimmy Robertson in the series Bosch, and Paul in Pulp Fiction.

== Early life ==
Calderón was born in Puerto Rico, and moved to New York City as a child. He served in the United States Army and studied acting under the G.I. Bill. He became a member of the Actors Studio in 1984, and was a founding member of the LAByrinth Theater Company.

== Career ==
Calderón got his big break in 1984 in a revival of Miguel Piñero's Short Eyes directed by Kevin Conway at the Second Stage Theatre. In 1995 he won an Obie and an Audelco Award for his performance in Blade to the Heat at the Public Theater. His most notable Broadway role was opposite Robert De Niro in Cuba and His Teddy Bear.

He appeared Off-Broadway in such plays as Requiem for a Heavyweight; Two Sisters and a Piano and Dancing on Her Knees, both written by Nilo Cruz; Troilus and Cressida at the Delacorte Theater in Central Park, in the role of Achilles; and Divine Horsemen for the LAByrinth Theater Company, a play which he had written, directed and produced. He wrote and directed Master of the Crossroads, based on his own short story; it was premiered at the Bridge Theater in Manhattan, starring Kate Jackson. He has had various short stories published in literary journals. His last published story was "Primitive Grace" for the international e-magazine Noir Nation.

In the 1980s, Calderón appeared in several TV series. He acted in three episodes of Miami Vice, playing a different character in each. He also appeared in the extended music video of "Bad" by Michael Jackson (who played the film's main character, Darryl).

Calderón appeared in Abel Ferrara's 1992 crime drama Bad Lieutenant, starring Harvey Keitel.

Calderón was almost cast as Jules Winnfield in the 1994 film Pulp Fiction, since director Quentin Tarantino had been impressed by his audition, but the role eventually went to Samuel L. Jackson, and Calderón was given a role as a bartender, Paul, who speaks the line, "Hey, my name's Paul and this shit's between y'all," to John Travolta's character, Vincent Vega.

He has performed in numerous feature films, including King of New York, Sea of Love, The Last Castle, The Firm, Four Rooms, Out of Sight, La Soga, Cop Land, The Addiction, Welcome to New York, and 21 Grams.

He has made many guest appearances on television series, including recurring roles on Dream Street, Law & Order and Miami Vice. In 2012, he guest-starred in the Blue Bloods episode "Domestic Disturbance", playing Lieutenant Martin Perez. (He reprised the role in the 2016 Blue Bloods episode "Back in the Day".) Calderón worked on two films in 2012: West End, directed by Joe Basille; and Biodegradable, a futuristic film shot in the Dominican Republic with an all Latino cast, directed by Juan Basanta. In 2014, he played Arquimedes, the bodyguard of Enoch "Nucky" Thompson in seven episodes of the fifth (final) season of the HBO series Boardwalk Empire. He played Alejandro, a recurring role on Fear the Walking Dead. Since 2017, he has appeared as Detective Santiago "Jimmy" Robertson on the Amazon TV series, Bosch.

In 2023, he reprised his role from Out of Sight as Raymond Cruz in the FX miniseries Justified: City Primeval.

In 2025, he reprised his role of Detective Santiago "Jimmy" Robertson in the Bosch spinoff series Bosch: Legacy.

== Personal life ==
Calderón lives in Brooklyn with his wife Catherine. They have two children.

== Filmography ==
=== Film ===
Year	Title	Role	Notes
1985	Tenement	Hector	
1986	Band of the Hand	Tito	
1988	Sticky Fingers	Speed	
1988	The Chair	Pizza	
1989	Sea of Love	Juan	
1990	King of New York	Joey Dalesio	
1990	Q&A	Roger Montalvo	
1992	CrissCross	Blacky	
1992	Bad Lieutenant	Cop #1	
1993	The Firm	Thomas Richie	
1994	Pulp Fiction	Paul	
1995	Clockers	Jesus at Hambones	
1995	Four Rooms	Norman	Segment: "The Man from Hollywood"
1995	The Addiction	Professor	
1997	Cop Land	Hector	
1998	OK Garage	Carl	
1998	One Tough Cop	Sgt. Diaz	
1998	Out of Sight	Raymond Cruz	
1999	Oxygen	Jesse	
2000	Girlfight	Sandro Guzman	
2000	Once in the Life	Manny Rivera	
2001	The Last Castle	Sergeant Major Dellwo	
2003	Kill the Poor	Carlos	
2003	21 Grams	Brown	
2006	The Sentinel	Deputy Director Cortes	
2009	La Soga	Rafa	
2009	The Hungry Ghosts	Carl	
2014	Welcome to New York	Pierre	

=== Television ===
Year	Title	Role	Notes
1985	The Equalizer	Rat Heart	Episode: "Reign of Terror"
1986	Rockabye	Street Vendor	TV movie
1987	The Equalizer	Chacon	Episode: "Shadow Play"
1991	Law & Order	Father Roberto Torres	Episode: "The Secret Sharers"
1993	Law & Order	Rodriguez	Episode: "Virus"
1994	New York Undercover	Carlos Ortiz	Episode: "To Protect and Serve"
1995	New York Undercover	Emilio Vasquez	Episode: "Innocent Bystanders"
1996	New York Undercover	Arnell Flores	Episode: "Blue Boy"
1998	Law & Order	Jesse Castillo	Episode: "Monster"
2001	Law & Order	Palmieri	Episode: "Sunday in the Park with Jorge"
2003	Law & Order: Criminal Intent	Jojo Rios	Episode: "Legion"
2004	Law & Order	Veteran's Day	Episode: "Kenneth Silva"
2005	Law & Order: Trial by Jury	Detective	Episode: "Truth or Consequences"
2006	Law & Order: Special Victims Unit	Assemblyman Eric Molina	Episode: "Fat"
2009	Lie to Me	Manny Trillo	Episode: "Unchained"
2010	Law & Order: Criminal Intent	Marcus Feingold	Episode: "Disciple"
2012–2016	Blue Bloods	Lieutenant Martin Perez	2 episodes
2014	Boardwalk Empire	Arquimedes	7 episodes
2016	Fear the Walking Dead	Alejandro	6 episodes
2017–2021	Bosch	Detective Santiago "Jimmy" Robertson	30 episodes
2022	East New York	Father Frank	2 episodes
2022–2025	Bosch: Legacy	Detective Santiago "Jimmy" Robertson	5 episodes
2023	Justified: City Primeval	Raymond Cruz	TV miniseries
2025	Ironheart	Arthur Robbins	Miniseries; 4 episodes
2026	Cape Fear	Padrino	TV miniseries

== See also ==
- List of Puerto Ricans
