= On the Shoulders of Giants =

On the Shoulders of Giants may refer to:

- Standing on the shoulders of giants, a Western metaphor
- On the Shoulders of Giants: A Shandean Postscript (book), a 1965 book by Robert K. Merton traces the history of the aphorism.
- On the Shoulders of Giants (book), a 2002 compilation of scientific texts edited by Stephen Hawking
- On the Shoulders of Giants (film), a 2011 historical sports documentary film
- On the Shoulders of Giants (album), a 2020 album by Chris Byars
- On the Shoulders of Giants, a 2017 book by Umberto Eco
