= On the Shoulders of Giants (album) =

Studio album by Chris Byars
- Released: March 15, 2020
- Recorded: February 2019
- Length: 55:28
- Label: SteepleChase Records
- Producer: Nils Winther

Chris Byars chronology
A Hundred Years from Today (2018)	On the Shoulders of Giants (2020)	Rhythm And Blues Of The 20s (2021)

On the Shoulders of Giants is an album by the American jazz saxophonist Chris Byars, released in 2020. It features a sextet without a chordal instrument, in which solos are accompanied with arranged horn harmonies. The sound on the album has been compared to that of Gerry Mulligan's pianoless groups.

== Critical reception ==
Professional ratings
Review scores
Source	Rating
Tom Hull	B+

Ken Dryden, writing for the New York City Jazz Record, stated that "The music sounds like it has been worked out in concert, sounding effortless" and that "The engaging performances on this CD will stand the test of time." Scott Yanow, writing in the L.A. Jazz Scene, praised the horn arrangements, stating that "Everyone has opportunities to shine in their solos yet the arranged ensembles that accompany them are often just as noteworthy."

== Track listing ==
All tracks written by Chris Byars except as otherwise indicated

1. Big Red (Tommy Turrentine) – 6:10
2. Keeper – 4:34
3. Closer – 7:18
4. Nashville – 10:19
5. Arizona – 6:15
6. Philadelphia – 5:54
7. Ste. Phanourios – 10:08
8. Third Culture Kid – 8:46
9. Moscow – 5:28

== Personnel ==
- Chris Byars – tenor saxophone
- Zaid Nasser – alto saxophone
- Stefano Doglioni – bass clarinet
- John Mosca – trombone
- Ari Roland – bass
- Phil Stewart – drums
