= Welcome to New York =

Welcome to New York may refer to:

- Welcome to New York (album), a 2010 recording by Ehud Asherie
- "Welcome to New York" (song), a song by Taylor Swift from the album 1989
- Welcome to New York (TV series), an American sitcom that aired from 2000 to 2001
- Welcome to New York (2012 film), a comedic short film
- Welcome to New York (2014 film), a French-American drama starring Gérard Depardieu
- Welcome to New York (2018 film), an Indian comedy film directed by Chakri Toleti

== See also ==
- "Welcome to New York City", a 2002 song by Cam'ron
