= The Jazz Session =

Jazz interview podcast

- Genre: Jazz
- Country of origin: United States
- Language: English

Creative team
- Created by: Jason Crane

Cast and voices
- Hosted by: List: Jason Crane; Nicky Schrire

Music
- Theme music composed by: The Respect Sextet
- Opening theme: In the Shadow of my Bier

Production
- Length: 30-60 minutes

Publication
- Original release: 24 February 2007

The Jazz Session is a jazz-interview podcast created by Jason Crane in 2007.

In the podcast's first episode, Crane interviewed saxophonist Grant Stewart. One of its earliest episodes featured Crane's interview with guitarist John Abercrombie.

In 2009, Crane and Michael Ricci developed a promotional partnership between the podcast and Ricci's website All About Jazz to which Crane had been contributing as a writer. From 2009 to 2012, Patrick Jarenwattananon made frequent mention of episodes of the show on National Public Radio's jazz blog, A Blog Supreme.

In 2012, the podcast featured a series of episodes called Jazz or Bust which included Crane's interviews with musicians and others in places he visited during a tour of the United States and Canada. Among those he interviewed was John D'Earth in Virginia. One of the stops on the Jazz or Bust tour was Auburn, Alabama where Crane ended up moving later that year, stopping production.

In 2013, after a crowdfunding effort promising to re-launch the podcast, Crane relocated to State College, Pennsylvania to be closer to family and started producing new episodes. By 2015, it could boast over 2.5 million downloads.

In 2021, Crane turned over control of the podcast to Nicky Schrire, who turned control back to Crane in 2022.

By 2023, The Jazz Session featured interviews with over 600 musicians including artists such as Sonny Rollins, Marian MacPartland, and Vijay Iyer.

The show's theme music is excerpted from a recording by The Respect Sextet.
