= Downtown Sounds =

Studio album by Grant Stewart
- Recorded: December 27, 1992
- Studio: RPM Sound, New York City, New York
- Genre: Jazz
- Length: 59:56
- Label: Criss Cross

Downtown Sounds is an album by jazz tenor saxophonist Grant Stewart.

== Background ==
This was Stewart's first album as leader.

== Music and recording ==
The album was recorded on December 27, 1992, in New York City. Stewart was 21 at the time.

== Reception ==
The Penguin Guide to Jazz described it as "tough-tender hard bop, played with intelligence and resolutely unsurprising."

Professional ratings
Review scores
Source	Rating
AllMusic	3/5 stars
The Penguin Guide to Jazz	3/4 stars

== Track listing ==
1. "Audobahn" (Sonny Rollins) – 5:20
2. "Smada" (Billy Strayhorn) – 7:53
3. "Daydream" (Strayhorn, Duke Ellington, John La Touche) – 7:36
4. "From This Moment On" (Cole Porter) – 7:00
5. "A Bee Has Two Brains" (Johnny Ellis) – 8:03
6. "Sweet and Lovely" (Gus Arnheim, Harry Tobias, Jules Lemare) – 8:06
7. "Intimacy of the Blues" (Strayhorn) – 7:48
8. "Ko-Ko" (Charlie Parker) – 8:08

== Personnel ==
- Grant Stewart – tenor sax
- Joe Magnarelli – trumpet
- Brad Mehldau – piano
- Peter Washington – bass
- Kenny Washington – drums
