= Sacha Perry =

American jazz pianist, composer and pedagogue

- Born: May 1, 1970 (age 56); Brooklyn, New York, U.S.
- Occupations: Pianist, composer, pedagogue
- Years active: 1988–present
- Musical career
- Genres: Jazz, bebop, swing
- Instrument: Piano

Sacha Perry (born May 1, 1970) is an American jazz pianist, composer and pedagogue.

== Education and career ==
Sacha Perry is an exponent of the bebop and hard bop styles, which he learned as a protégé of Barry Harris and Frank Hewitt, and he particularly carries the tradition of vernacular musicians Bud Powell, Elmo Hope, Thelonious Monk and Herbie Nichols. Perry appears regularly at Smalls Jazz Club in New York, the record label of which releases his albums featuring his compositions. He has worked closely with Aaron Johnson, Teddy Charles and Bob Mover, among other jazz musicians.

=== As teacher ===
Sacha Perry has taught piano at Jazz Futures in Nicosia and in New York.

== Discography ==
=== As leader ===
- Eretics (Smalls, 2005)
- Not Brand X (Smalls, 2007) (Note: Not Brand X appears in Will Smith's list of ten best albums of 2007 in JazzTimes and in Duck Baker's list of ten best albums of 2007 in Coda.)
- Third Time Around (Smalls, 2007)

=== As sideman ===
- Chris Byars, Photos in Black, White and Gray (Smalls, 2007)
- Zaid Nasser, Escape From New York (Smalls, 2007)
- Zaid Nasser, Off Minor (Smalls, 2008)
