= John Mosca (musician) =

American jazz trombonist (born 1950)

- Born: June 22, 1950 (age 76); New York City
- Genres: Jazz
- Instrument: Trombone
- Member of: Vanguard Jazz Orchestra
- Formerly of: Across 7 Street
- Spouse: Nancy Oatts
- Education: Juilliard School

John Mosca (born June 22, 1950) is an American jazz trombonist, big band leader and music educator.

Mosca started out as a flautist before switching to the trombone. He studied trombone with Charlie Small and then continued his studies with Per Brevig at the Juilliard School. He played in various big bands, including those of Al Porcino, Buddy Rich, Frank Foster (with whom he made his first recordings for in 1975), Don Sebesky and the Thad Jones/Mel Lewis Orchestra (from 1975 to 1990). He became the co-leader of the Vanguard Jazz Orchestra, the successor to the Thad Jones/Mel Lewis Orchestra, in 1990. He has also performed with the Carnegie Hall Jazz Band and Across 7 Street. Mosca has also been an educator at the Manhattan School of Music, the New England Conservatory and the University of Connecticut.

== Discography ==
=== With the Vanguard Jazz Orchestra ===
- Lickety Split, The Music of Jim McNeely (New World Records, 1997)
- Thad Jones Legacy (New World, 1999)
- Can I Persuade You (Planet Arts, 2001)
- The Way - Music of Slide Hampton (Planet Arts, 2003)
- Up From the Skies - Music of Jim McNeely (Planet Arts, 2005)
- Monday Night Live at The Village Vanguard (Planet Arts, 2008)
- Forever Lasting - Live in Tokyo (Planet Arts, 2010)
