= Welcome to New York (album) =

Studio album by Ehud Asherie
- Released: 2010
- Recorded: February 4–5, 2010
- Studio: Nola Studios, New York City
- Genre: Jazz
- Label: Arbors

Welcome to New York is a solo piano album by Ehud Asherie. It was recorded in 2010 and released by Arbors Records.

== Recording and music ==
The album of solo piano performances by Ehud Asherie was recorded at Nola Studios in New York City, on February 4 and 5, 2010. Each track has a New York theme. Some of the performances feature stride playing. Asherie inserts musical quotations into some of the tracks.

== Release and reception ==
Professional ratings
Review scores
Source	Rating
AllMusic	4/5 stars

Welcome to New York was released by Arbors Records in 2010. The JazzTimes reviewer concluded that "Asherie studied hard for his first solo test." The AllMusic reviewer wrote that "Welcome to New York demonstrates that Ehud Asherie has truly arrived on the jazz scene."

== Track listing ==
1. "Drop Me Off in Harlem"
2. "Manhattan Serenade"
3. "52nd Street Theme"
4. "Autumn in New York"
5. "42nd Street"
6. "Lullaby of Broadway"
7. "Somewhere"
8. "Harlem Bound"
9. "Lovers in New York"
10. "Lonely Town"
11. "Harlem Strut"
12. "Manhattan"
13. "Take the 'A' Train"

== Personnel ==
- Ehud Asherie – piano
