= Karapet Yeghiazaryan =

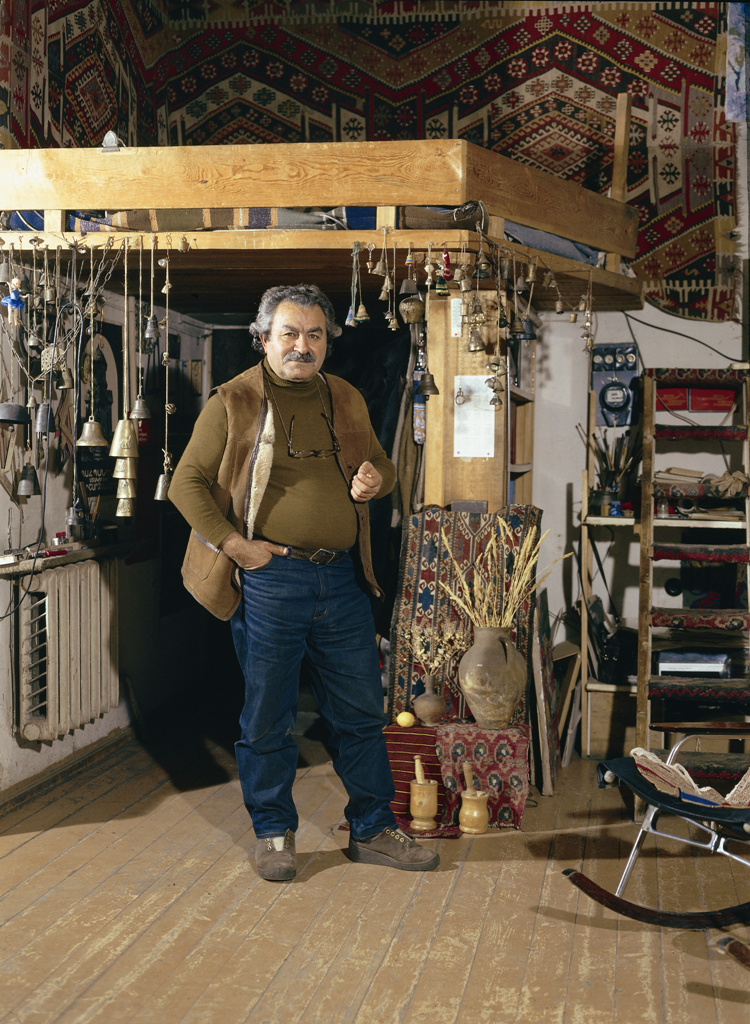
- Born: March 7, 1932; Yerevan, Soviet Armenia
- Died: 2006 (aged 73–74); Yerevan
- Known for: Painter, Tapestry
- Notable work: "Song About Armenia", "Victorious Return", "Soldier’s Weeding", "Blossom, Our Lord"
- Children: Anush Yeghiazaryan
- Awards: Honored Artist of Armenia (1983)

Karapet Yeghiazaryan (Armenian: Կարապետ Եղիազարյան; March 7, 1932 in Yerevan – 2006 in Yerevan) was an Armenian painter, Honored Artist of Armenia, 1983.

== Biography ==
Karapet Yeghiazaryuan was born in 1932 in Yerevan. The artistic depth of his nature was revealed in his childhood in his love towards nature, his perception of the beauty of its views and colors. He attended the painting group of the Ghoukassian Haouse of Pioneers (teacher Gagik Ghazaryan).

- 1953 graduated from Panos Terlemezyan Art College
- 1959 graduated from Leningrad Artistic Industrial High School after Mukhina
- 1972–1987 headed the section of decorative and applied arts of the RA Painter's Association
- 1973–1987 was a member of the Presidium and the Presidency of the RA Painter's Association
- 1962–1979 delivered lectures on design, painting and composition in the Terlemezyan Artistic College, for which in 1972 he was awarded an Honor Diploma of the Ministry of High and Secondary Special Education of the Armenian SSR, National Committee of Science and High School Education Workers
- 1964–1974 delivered lectures in the Yerevan Artistic and Theatrical Institute

Yeghiazaryan's works are exhibited in art galleries, museum, well-known cultural centers and private collections of Yerevan, Gyumri, Echmiadzin, Moscow, London, New York City, Kerch, Volgodonsk and in many cities of Russian Federation, the city of Timirtau in Kazakhstan, as well as other countries.

His daughter Anush Yeghiazaryan is also a participant of the present stage of development of the Armenian tapestry.

== Career ==
The personal style of Yeghiazaryan formed progressively; his mastership grew year after year; skills shaping his own language in his works grew more perfect. The first attempts made by Yeghiazaryan were to introduce partial modifications in traditional oriental carpets. In these series of his work, the most interesting is the tapestry Praying for Peace (1967), in which the author managed to put into natural connection human static figures with ornaments filling the entire surface of the work. The master organically transferred stylistic principles of the weaving art devices into the language of mosaics and obtained most interesting decorative effects, this time in the material of ‘stone carpet’. Yeghiazaryan created works with logical structure which allows to read with precision the author's thought and to create a unique ornamental structural system. Along with strict compositional order, one feels in Yeghiazaryan's works the material, the wool, its softness, tenderness, density, its capacity of absorbing light to entirely render the deepness and strength of color.

Yeghiazaryan's frame of themes are: native Armenia, national traditions, events of social life and images of nature. Each new work was a further step leading to the solutions of image, contents and artistic problems.

== Works ==
Yeghiazaryan is the author of numerous mosaic panels, including:

- Synthetics, 1967
- Paradise, 1968, for which he was awarded by a Diploma of the Presidium of the Supreme Soviet of Armenian SSR, and which is now decorating the Memorial complex of the Sardarapat battle.
- Grapes, 1969, now in the city of Artashat
- The Sprout and the Sun, 1970, with co-authors M. Kamalyan and Ts. Azizyan, this huge composition is on the façade of the Institute of Biochemistry of the Armenian National Academy of Sciences.
- Khachatur Abovyan, 1972, in the city of Abovyan, done from small multicolor pieces of natural stones. In this mosaic the painter managed to realize his innovation, beautifully joining the color to the texture of stone and metal, attempting to reach necessary artistic integrity.
- Science, 1972
- Peace, 1975
- Victory Review, 1975
- Blossom, Our Lord, 1977, 140 m^{2}, Usk-Kamenogorsk metallurgists’ Palace of Culture. This is a three-part composition, the three main panels of which are done in the relief texture technique, while parts between them and the tapestry borders are done in flat technique. The relief technique of Yeghiazaryan has also a functional role. The themes of the three main panels are: in the left side- Center of Metallurgy, in the center-Science and Labor, in the right side-People are Cheerful, devoted to the development of arts and people talents.
- History of Communication, 1977, performed on the façade and the end wall of the Yerevan Branch of the Soviet Project Institute of Communication (now Armentel). Above the main entrance of the building the mosaic triptych has a total surface of 400 m^{2}. It is narrating the history of communication, science and astronautics. The mosaic is done from Armenian multicolor stones.
- Soldier's Weeding, 1978
- Glory Firework (180 m^{2}), 1978, curtain-tapestry for the city of Kerch
- Stage of Great Way (180 m^{2}), 1980, curtain-tapestry for the city of Komsomolsk
- Electricity in the Mountains, 1982
- I am the Eye and You Are the Light, 1982
- To the Health, 1982
- Yard Tournament, 1982
- Abundance, 1983
- Song About Armenia, 1984
- Victorious Return, 1985
- Ode of Life, 1987
- Curtain Art (180 m^{2}), 1989, for the city of Volgodonsk
- Sacrificem 1992
- Three Graces, 1996
- Armenian Pilgrims, 1997
- Towards Light, 2003
- Requiem monumental panel, 2005, 9 m^{2}, dedicated to the 1700th anniversary of the adoption of Christianity in Armenia, done in a different style developing rather ideas of constructive design, than those of artistic textile; it was awarded by a special prize of the Armenian Church and an Honor Diploma of the Painter's Association of the RA

== Exhibitions ==
Yeghioazaryan participated in numerous exhibitions, international symposiums and biennales, and held personal exhibitions in Armenia and abroad.

== Quotes about Karapet Yeghiazaryan ==
Professor Nikita Voronov, Art critic, PH.D., “Armenian Tapestry”, SovetakanArvest (Soviet Art), N 11, 1978, Yerevan (in Russian):

“… in the mosaic made by Karapet Yeghiazaryan, one can distinctly see carpet ornaments. Subsequently, the painter was guided by some fundamental compositional principles of weaving art, which influenced his works made with other materials, too.”

Grigor Khanjyan, Member of the USSR Academy of Fine arts, People's Artist, “A Curtain Representing Art”. Sovetakan Hayastan (Soviet Armenia), July 1986, Yerevan (in Armenian):

“Merited painter Karapet Yeghiazaryan is a multilaterally talented creator. His famous curtain Renaissance (1986) is decorating the scene of the Yerevan Sport and Concert Complex. I am the author of its composition, but the collaboration with Karapet Yeghiazaryna was indispensable to transform it into a curtain. Our common creative work created a piece of art of 360m 2, having 30 meters width and 12 meter height, which will decorate the wall of one of our architectural masterpieces”. -

== See also ==
- List of Armenian artists
- List of Armenians
- Culture of Armenia
