= Lucy Yeghiazaryan =

American jazz and folk singer (born 1991)

- Yeghiazaryan in 2022

Background information
- Born: Lusine Yeghiazaryan; 29 January 1991 (age 35)
- Genres: Jazz; Armenian folk
- Occupation: Musician
- Instruments: Vocals; violin
- Years active: 2010s–present
- Labels: Cellar Live; La Reserve
- Member of: YY Sisters
- Spouse: Grant Stewart
- Website: lucyjazznyc.com

Lusine "Lucy" Yeghiazaryan (born 29 January 1991) is an Armenian vocalist and violinist specializing in jazz and Armenian folk music.

== Life and career ==
Yeghiazaryan grew up in post-Soviet Armenia and her family immigrated to the U.S. in 2002. She studied at the New Jersey Performing Arts Center's Jazz for Teens Program. Upon graduation in 2015, she moved to New York City where she quickly ingratiated herself into the jazz scene and began working with Grant Stewart, Houston Person, Peter Bernstein, Joe Farnsworth, Bruce Harris, Terell Stafford, Peter Washington, Bernadette Peters, and Arto Tunçboyacıyan, among others. Described by DownBeat as having "deep musical phrasing and a penchant for conversational improvising", Yeghiazaryan has received grants from the Doris Duke Foundation, Chamber Music America, and the New York Foundation for the Arts.

== Personal ==
Yeghiazaryan is married to the Canadian jazz saxophonist Grant Stewart.

== Discography ==
=== As leader ===
- Blue Heaven (Cellar Live, 2019)
- In Her Words (La Reserve, 2021)
- Lonely House (2022)
- Some Other Spring (2023)
- Beside the Golden Door (2024)
- Hey Love! (La Reserve, 2026)

=== As sidewoman ===
- Grant Stewart, Rise and Shine (La Reserve, 2020)
- Danny Jonokuchi, Voices (Outside in Music, 2023)
- Harry Allen, Album with Roses (2023)

With YY Sisters

- Yerek Hatik (Naregatsi Art Institute, 2012)
- At the Gate (Naregatsi Art Institute, 2017)
