= Chris Byars =

American jazz saxophonist and composer (born 1970)

Christopher Byars
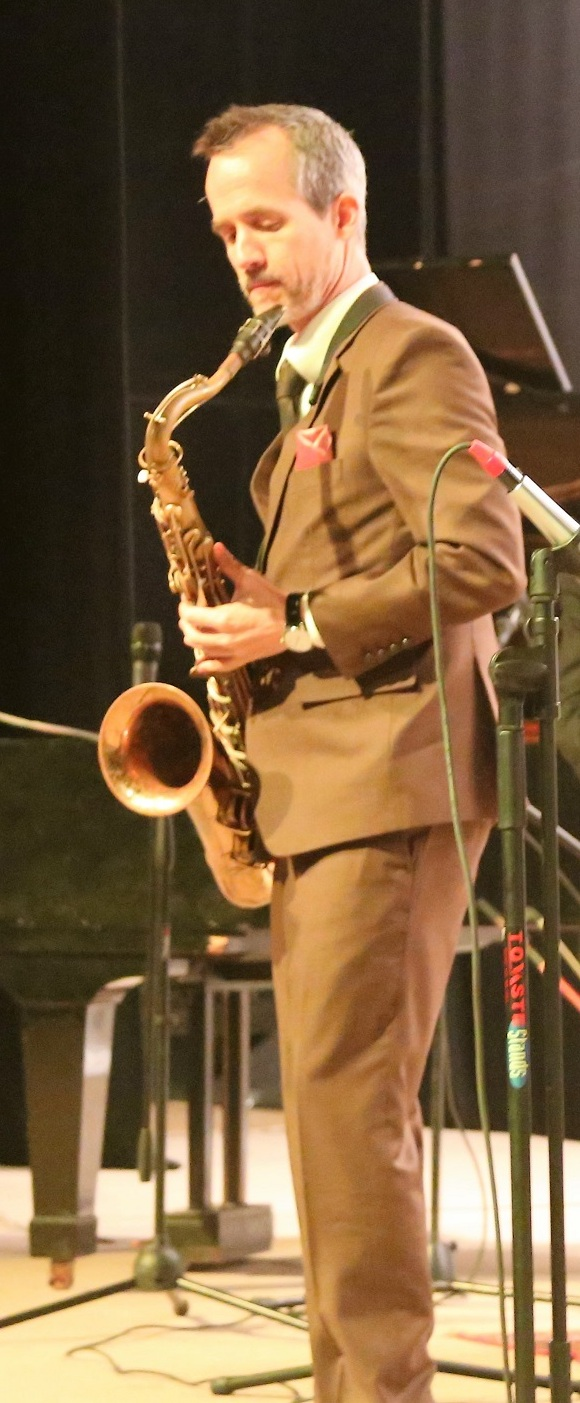

Background information
- Born: November 2, 1970 (age 55); New York City
- Genres: Jazz
- Occupation: Musician
- Instrument: Saxophone
- Labels: SteepleChase
- Website: chrisbyars.net

Christopher Byars (born November 2, 1970) is an American jazz saxophonist. Formerly a child opera singer, Byars has toured for the U.S. State Department as a jazz ambassador with frequent collaborator Ari Roland.

== Early life ==
Byars was born in New York City on November 2, 1970, to oboist James Byars and clarinetist Janita Byars. At six, he debuted as an opera performer joining the New York City Opera and Metropolitan Opera children's choirs, the New York City Ballet, and attending the School of American Ballet from ages 8 to 11 years old. He performed hundreds of shows as a child, including the title role in a made-for-TV adaptation of The Spellbound Child with George Balanchine. Puberty deepened his voice, and his singing career came to an end when his voice croaked during a performance of Tosca.

When Byars returned from his final tour as a singer in 1983, he was given a saxophone by his father and began focusing exclusively on jazz. As a teenager, he studied the music of Charlie Parker after his father gave him the albums Bird and Diz and Charlie Parker with Strings. Byars was influenced as a teenager by bassist Aaron Bell, pianist Barry Harris, who mentored him, and author Frank McCourt, his creative writing teacher at Stuyvesant High School. He earned his bachelor's and master's degrees in music from the Manhattan School of Music in 1990 and 1992 respectively.

== Career ==
Byars first set as a leader was a 1989 quartet date at the Angry Squire. In 1990, Byars co-founded Across 7 Street with Ari Roland as a tribute band to the erstwhile saxophonist Clarence Sharpe. The band performed Sunday nights at Smalls Jazz Club, playing original compositions inspired by the bebop era. In 1998, Byars joined the Frank Hewitt quintet, which featured former Across 7 Street members Roland and Jimmy Lovelace, performing Saturday nights with him for four years.

=== Jazz ambassador ===
Byars has visited more than 50 countries as a jazz ambassador. He began touring as part of the Ari Roland quartet with the State Department in December 2006 after making it to the finals of a competition held at Jazz at Lincoln Center. The tours are intended to improve America's image abroad, and feature Byars collaborating with local musicians and incorporating elements of their native traditions into jazz.

Inspired by his 2007 tour of Central Asia, Byars wrote the suite Jazz Pictures at an Exhibition of Himalayan Art, based on the Modest Mussorgsky piece Pictures at an Exhibition. The work has some foreign influences but is primarily based in the language of American jazz. It debuted at an October 2007 show at the Rubin Museum of Art, and was again played at the Museum in April 2008. The live performances featured Byars playing in front of a slideshow. An album of the same name was later released, with each composition corresponding to a painting on display at the Museum.

In 2008, Byars' quartet toured as part of The Rhythm Road: American Music Abroad, playing in Slovakia, Saudi Arabia, Cyprus, Montenegro, and Slovenia. In Muslim-majority areas, Byars won audiences over by telling them the story of Muslim American musician Basheer Qusim, a.k.a. Gigi Gryce.

After performing in a commemoration of the reopening of Ledra Street crossing, Byars co-directed the "Jazz Futures" program organized by the American embassy in Cyprus with Roland from 2008 to 2013. The series brought together Byars' groups and Turkish and Greek Cypriot musicians and audiences.

=== Tributes ===
Byars has recorded a number of tribute albums and live sets, playing the compositions of lesser known post-bop musicians. As part of the programs, Byars infuses his own musical identity with those of his predecessors.

From March 22 to 25, 2006, Byars led a four-night set at Smalls playing the compositions of Lucky Thompson, performing, at various points, with former Thompson sidemen John Hicks and Jerry Dodgion. During the preparation for the set, Byars and historian Noal Cohen discovered a private recording of an August 28, 1961, radio broadcast of Thompson's octet. Byars transcribed every arrangement on the recording and taught them to the members of his own octet. These compositions, as well as re-arrangements from Thompson's quartet records, were later played on the album Lucky Strikes Again.

In 2007, Byars' quartet played at Teddy Charles' house, at the behest of Cohen, helping to coax the vibraphonist-turned-captain back into playing music. In June of the next year, Byars premiered the composition Bop-ography, inspired by Charles' life, in Greenwich Village. He also played with the Teddy Charles Tentet in its first appearance since Charles' retirement. Byars would later record with Charles on Dances with Bulls, Charles' first studio recording in forty years, and his own album Bop-ography.

Byars has also worked on projects commemorating Freddie Redd, Gigi Gryce, Duke Jordan, Frank Strozier, and Jimmy Cleveland.

== Style ==
Byars' music is based in 1950s bebop, though with additional contemporary stylings. He developed as one of many younger players at Smalls Jazz Club during the 1990s, working with veteran players like Jimmy Lovelace and Frank Hewitt. Byars has used the octet format in his band to exploit the texture gains from a big band while retaining the fluidity of a small group.

== Personal life ==
Byars is a member of American Federation of Musicians Local 802. He lives with his second wife, Ayna, and has two children from a previous marriage. During the COVID-19 pandemic, he took up various government jobs for financial reasons. He has one brother, Michael Byars.

== Discography ==
=== Recordings ===
==== As leader ====
Year recorded	Title	Label
2001‍–‍2002	Night Owls	Smalls Records
2001‍–‍2002	The Darkling Thrush (with Sasha Dobson)	Smalls Records
2002	Made in New York (with Across 7 Street)	Smalls Records
2006	Photos in Black, White and Gray	Smalls Records
2007	Jazz Pictures At An Exhibition Of Himalayan Art	SteepleChase
2008	Blue Lights: The Music of Gigi Gryce	SteepleChase
2009	Bop-ography	SteepleChase
2010	Lucky Strikes Again	SteepleChase
2011	Music Forever	SteepleChase
2013	Jasmine Flower	SteepleChase
2014	The Music of Duke Jordan	SteepleChase
2014	Two Fives	SteepleChase
2015	The Music of Frank Strozier	SteepleChase
2016	New York City Jazz	SteepleChase
2018	A Hundred Years from Today	SteepleChase
2019	On the Shoulders of Giants	SteepleChase
2021	Rhythm And Blues Of The 20s	SteepleChase
2023	Look Ahead	SteepleChase
2024	Boptics	SteepleChase
2025	The Dark Forest	SteepleChase

==== As sideman ====
Year recorded	Leader	Title	Label
1999	Frank Hewitt	Four Hundred Saturdays	Smalls Records
2005	Ari Roland	Sketches from a Bassist's Album	Smalls Records
2007	Ari Roland	And So I Lived In Old New York	Smalls Records
2008	Teddy Charles	Dances with Bulls	Smalls Records
2009	Ari Roland	New Music	Smalls Records
2017	Phil Stewart	Introducing Phil Stewart: Melodious Drum	Cellar Live
