= Anush Yeghiazaryan =

Armenian artist (born 1965)

Anush Yeghiazaryan Անուշ Եղիազարյան
- Born: Anush Yeghiazaryan; June 15, 1965 (age 61); Yerevan, Armenia
- Known for: Painter, professor

Anush Yeghiazaryan (Armenian: Անուշ Եղիազարյան; born June 15, 1965), is an Armenian artist and an Honorary Professor of Moscow State Pedagogical University (2016).

== Biography ==
Anush Yeghiazaryan was born in Yerevan, Armenia into the family of Karapet Yeghiazaryan who was a Republic of Armenia Honored Artist and the patriarch of the Armenian school of art weaving.

- 1984–1990 studied in the Graphic Department of Yerevan's State Fine Arts Academy.
- 1991–1994 studied at the PhD course of the State Armenian Pedagogical University after Kh. Abovyan.
- 1996 Member of the Armenian Union of Artists.
- 1991–2014 gave lectures at the State Armenian Pedagogical University after Kh. Abovyan.
- 2003 received docent degree
- 2008 defended doctorate thesis at the State Armenian Pedagogical University after Kh. Abovyan and received Doctor's degree
- 2009 Member of the Bureau of the Decorative-Practical Art Branch of the RA Painters Union
- 2009 Chairperson of Design and Practical Decorative department of the Armenian Pedagogical University after Kh. Abovyan
- 2010 Member of the Pan-Armenian Painting Association
- 2011 received Professor's degree
- 2013 Member of the Executive Body of the RA Painters Union

== Yeghiazaryan's work ==
Anush Yeghiazaryan's work has been described as modern textile avant-garde, Armenian traditional carpet, and classical West European tapestry.

Anush Yeghiazaryan is an author.

== Exhibitions ==
Anush Yeghiazaryan has taken part in many art exhibitions, in many countries – Yerevan, Moscow, Sankt Peterburg, Bouve, Plovdil, Tehran, Paris, Italy, Praha.

- 2010 Personal Exhibition in Artists' Union of Armenia

== Quotes ==
"I have not chosen my art, it's in my blood. It's my life style and I love it up to sublimation degree."

== See also ==
- List of Armenian artists
- List of Armenians
- Culture of Armenia
