= Richie Vitale =

American jazz musician

Richie Vitale (born September 23, 1954; Rochester, New York) is an American jazz trumpeter, arranger, and composer.

== Performances ==
Vitale played trumpet in the 2010 Broadway show Come Fly Away with a 19-piece big band playing the music of Frank Sinatra and dancing of the Twyla Tharp Dance Troup. Vitale recorded his first album "Vitalogy" and two following CDs "Full Circle" and "Slow Groove" for Gut String Records. He has led his quartet/quintet on tours of Europe, Japan, Korea, the Middle East, San Francisco, and Los Angeles.

== Teaching ==
Vitale has taught Clinics and Master Classes at the Eastman School of Music, instructed the Jazz Ensemble at Long Island University and was Brass Instructor at Manhattan School of Music and Long Island University and is recently retired as jazz professor teaching trumpet and ensemble at New Jersey City University.

== Big Band experience ==
Vitale was a trumpet soloist with Frank Sinatra for five years and has also performed with Tony Bennett, Buddy Rich, James Taylor and Sting. He was featured soloist with the Vanguard Orchestra, the Toshiko Akiyoshi Big Band, the Basie Band, and the Ellington Band.

== Small group experience ==
Worked with Frank Wess, Jack Bruce and the Chris Byars Octet. Currently, working in the NYC metropolitan area and traveling as an artist.

== Activism ==
From July 2012, Vitale was a founding member of the Save Sibelius campaign, established by Derek Williams to future-proof the Sibelius music scorewriter application after Avid Tech had fired all but three of the Sibelius development team and closed their London office to relocate jobs offshore to Ukraine and California.

Amid subsequent collapsing share performance that involved Avid's delisting by NASDAQ, a 11,590 signature Change.org petition "chris-gahagan-senior-vice-president-of-products-sell-sibelius" to try to persuade Avid Tech to divest itself of Sibelius was presented in person to Sibelius Software executives from Avid invited to an extraordinary meeting held by the British Academy of Songwriters, Composers and Authors (BASCA) at its London offices.

The campaign ended in February 2013, after the Yamaha Corporation subsidiary Steinberg announced they had hired the majority of the former Sibelius development team to develop a rival scorewriter application, Dorico.

The Facebook 'Save Sibelius' campaign created by Vitale and Williams remains active, with 9,300 followers.

== Discography ==
As leader

- 1988 Dreamsville
- 1996 Live at Smalls
- 2000 Shake It!
- 2005 New York Salsa
- 2011 Vitalogy
- 2020 Full Circle
- 2021 Slow Groove

As sideman

- 1984 Vertical Currency
- 1992 Duets 2, Frank Sinatra
- 2006 The Evening Sound, Neil Minor Sextet
- 2006 Night Owls, Chris Byars Octet
