= Aaron M. Johnson =

American jazz saxophonist (born 1991)

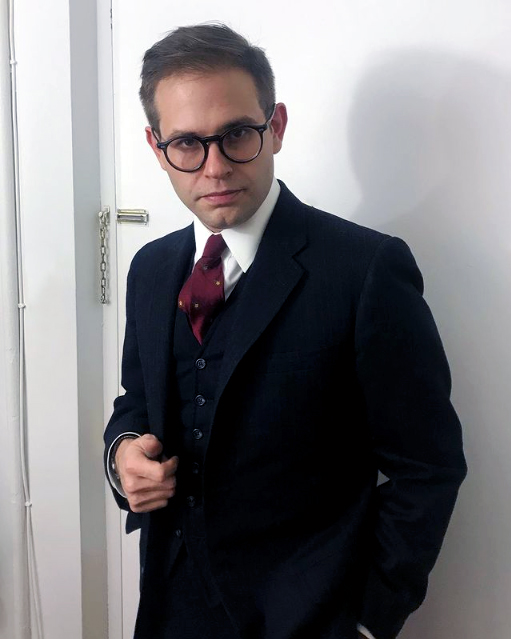
- Johnson in 2022
- Born: June 9, 1991 (age 35); Coos Bay, Oregon, U.S.
- Occupations: Musician; writer; performance artist
- Years active: 2009–present
- Relatives: Joanne Verger (grandmother)
- Musical career
- Genres: Jazz; bebop; swing
- Instruments: Saxophone; clarinet; flute
- Website: aaronjohnsonisunderground.com

Aaron Michael Johnson (born June 9, 1991) is an American jazz saxophonist, writer and performance artist.

== Early life ==
Aaron Johnson began expressing interest in music at a young age. While he could play music fluently by the age of 13, he still could not read notation. His earliest woodwinds instructor, Matt Utal, recounted, "He was precocious, very bright and advanced for his age. I stressed the importance of learning to read, and he bogged down for a long time and became a great reader." Johnson was later educated at the Manhattan School of Music.

== Career ==
At age 18, Johnson was chosen as lead alto saxophonist in the Gibson/Baldwin Grammy Jazz Ensemble, with whom he performed and attended 51st Annual Grammy week. , initially with his ensemble Aaron Johnson's Reboppers, and eventually with the Aaron Johnson Quartet.

== Awards and honors ==
In 2009, at age 17, Johnson became the youngest musician ever to be awarded the Outstanding Soloist title at the Monterey Next Generation Jazz Festival.
