= Smalls Jazz Club =

Jazz club in New York City

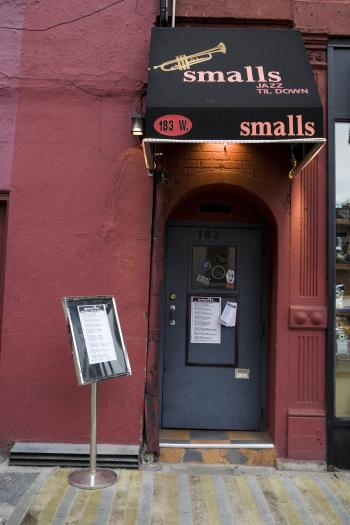
- Smalls Jazz Club in New York City
- Interactive map of Smalls Jazz Club
- Address: 183 West 10th Street
- Location: Greenwich Village, New York City
- Coordinates: 40°44′4″N 74°0′10″W
- Owner: Spike Wilner
- Capacity: 74
- Type: jazz club
- Event: Jazz

Construction
- Opened: 1994

Website
- smallslive.com

Smalls Jazz Club is a jazz club at 183 West 10th Street, Greenwich Village, New York City. Established in 1994, it earned a reputation in the 1990s as a "hotbed for New York's jazz talent" with a "well-deserved reputation as one of the best places in the city to see rising talent in the New York jazz scene". Its music is characterized as "modern versions of bebop and hard bop". The club's main room is in a basement with a capacity of 50 people that expanded to 60 people.

== History ==
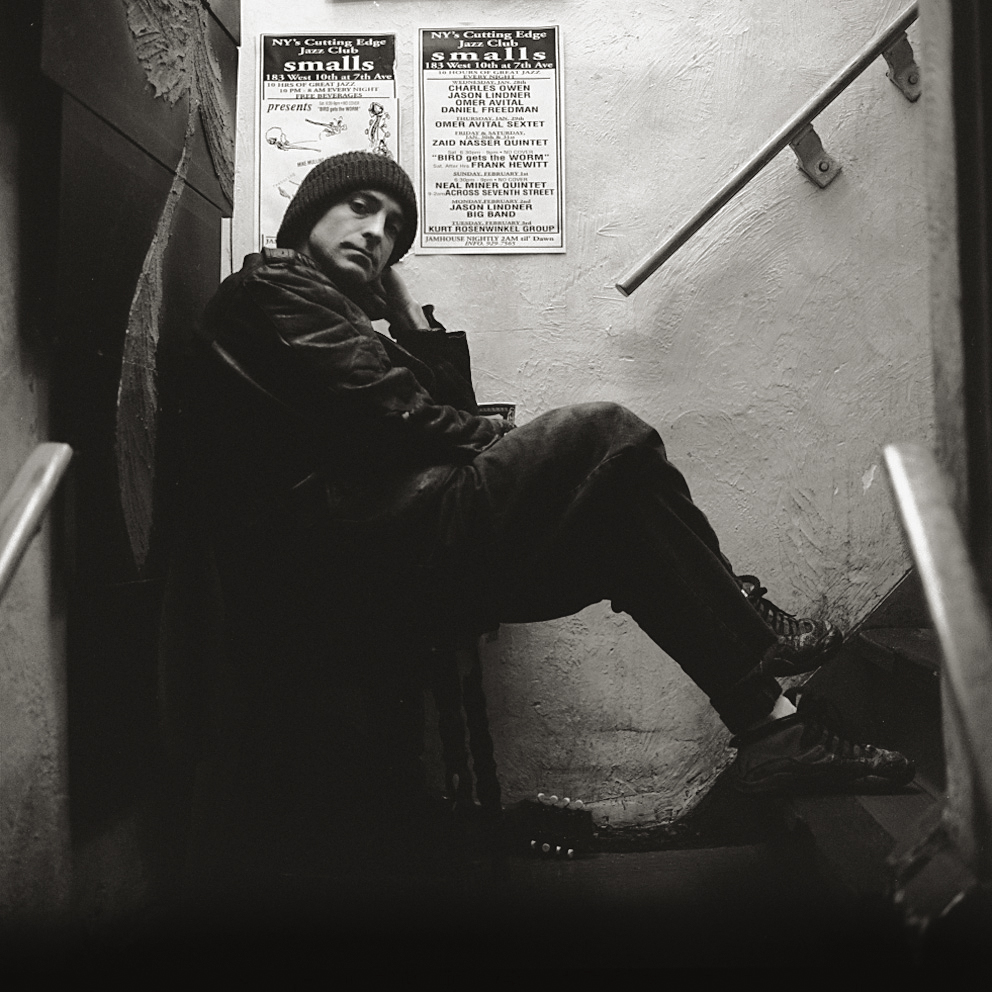
Borden sits at the register in 1998.

Smalls Jazz Club was established in 1994 by Mitchell "Mitch" Borden, a former submariner and nurse. Its target audience was characterized as young, bohemian, and talkative. Music commenced every night at 10:30 and at times lasted until 6:00 the following morning.

The entrance fee was US$10.00; no alcohol was served. Musicians who performed in the early years include Ehud Asherie, Omer Avital, Noah Becker, Peter Bernstein, Avishai Cohen, Ari Hoenig, Guillermo Klein, Jason Lindner, Charles Owens, Kurt Rosenwinkel, Grant Stewart, Mark Turner, Tommy Turrentine, Richie Vitale, Michael Weiss, and Myron Walden. The house pianist was Frank Hewitt.

Financial difficulties led Borden to close Smalls on May 31, 2003. The closing was due to declining attendance after the September 11 attacks, rent increases in this neighborhood, and a smoking ban in indoor public places imposed by Mayor Michael Bloomberg. Concerts were moved into the Fat Cat Club next door, which was open four nights a week until 2:00 AM. In 2004, the Brooklyn Jazz Underground premiered with four shows at Smalls.

In early 2006, Borden and musicians Michael "Spike" Wilner and Lee Kostrinsky reopened Smalls. The club was restored and the sound quality was improved. Chairs were bought at 17 stoop sales. A poster of Louis Armstrong from the original Smalls hangs on the wall. There is a full-service bar. Smalls continues to be recommended as a top jazz club. The entrance fee was raised to US$20. The first music set begins at 7:30 PM. Instead of all night jazz sessions, there are two or three sets per night. All concerts are broadcast live on the club's website and are available in replay to subscribers. The renovated club has featured Bruce Barth, Aaron M. Johnson, Sacha Perry, Leon Parker, Steve Slagle, Peter Bernstein, Jimmy Cobb, Steve Davis, Joel Frahm, Kevin Hays, Ethan Iverson, Jazz Incorporated (Jeremy Pelt, Anthony Wonsey, Louis Hayes), David Kikoski, Ryan Kisor, Bill Mobley, Tim Ries, Jim Rotondi, and Neal Smith.

In 2013, the club started recording and streaming its daily performances over the internet. For a subscription fee, audiences could watch archived videos and live performances. The revenues generated from this subscription are split with artists.

During the COVID-19 pandemic, the club shifted to live-streaming daily performances over the internet, with minimal audiences allowed at times. The SmallsLive Foundation was created to receive sponsorships for these performances.

== Record labels ==
Since 2007 the club has had record label produced by Luke Kaven,. The new owners of Smalls created the label Smalls Live, which publishes some concerts at the club. It is distributed by Harmonia Mundi.

=== Smalls Live discography ===
- The Ian Hendrickson-Smith Group, Live at Smalls (2010) – rec. February 8–9, 2008
- The Ryan Kisor Quintet, Live at Smalls (2010) – rec. May 16–17, 2008
- The Kevin Hays Trio, Live at Smalls (2010) – rec. August 13–14, 2008
- The Dave Kikoski Trio, Live at Smalls (2010) – rec. November 18–19, 2008
- The Peter Bernstein Quartet Feat. Jimmy Cobb, Live at Smalls (2010) – rec. December 17–18, 2008
- The Steve Davis Quintet Feat. Larry Willis, Live at Smalls (2009) – rec. January 7–8, 2009
- The Neal Smith Quintet, Live at Smalls (2010) – rec. August 23–24, 2009
- The Seamus Blake Quintet, Live at Smalls (2010) – rec. August 31 – September 1, 2009
- The Jim Rotondi Quintet, Live at Smalls (2010) – rec. October 21–22, 2009
- Ethan Iverson, Albert Tootie Heath, Ben Street, Live at Smalls (2010) – rec. November 16–18, 2009
- Planet Jazz, Live at Smalls (2010) – rec. January 8–9, 2010
- Ari Hoenig, Punkbop: Live at Smalls (2010) – rec. February 8, 2010
- The Jimmy Greene Quartet, Live at Smalls (2010) – rec. February 19–20, 2010
- The Omer Avital Group, Live at Smalls (2011) – rec. April 5–6, 2010
- The Ben Wolfe Quintet, Live at Smalls (2010) – rec. May 25–26, 2010
- Jazz Incorporated, Live at Smalls (2011) – rec. August 27–28, 2010
- Cyrille Aimée & Friends, Live at Smalls (2011) – rec. September 26 & 30, 2010
- Bruce Barth Trio, Live at Smalls (2011) – rec. September 29–30, 2010
- The Flail, Live at Smalls (2011) – rec. October 8–9, 2010
- The Tim Ries Quintet, Live at Smalls (2011) – rec. December 3–4, 2010
- Bernstein, Goldings, Stewart, Live at Smalls (2011) – rec. January 6–8, 2011
- Joel Frahm Quartet, Live at Smalls (2011)– rec. February 28 – March 1, 2011
- The Lage Lund Four, Live at Smalls (2012) – rec. May 3–4, 2011
- The Rick Germanson Quartet Feat. Dr. Eddie Henderson, Live at Smalls (2011) – rec. July 15–16, 2011
- The Jesse Davis Quintet, Live at Smalls (2012) – rec. December 13–15, 2011
- Ralph Lalama, Bopjuice: Live at Smalls (2012) – rec. December 14–15, 2011
- Dezron Douglas, Live at Smalls (2012) – rec. March 23–24, 2012
- Grant Stewart, Live at Smalls (2012) – rec. April 6–7, 2012
- Tyler Mitchell, Live at Smalls (2012) – rec. April 15, 2012
- Harold Mabern, Live at Smalls (2013) – rec. June 22–23, 2012
- Alex Sipiagin, Live at Smalls (2013) – rec. June 25–26, 2012
- Joe Magnarelli, Live at Smalls (2012) – rec. August 31 – September 1, 2012
- Rodney Green Quartet, Live at Smalls (2013) – rec. October 16–17, 2012
- Frank Lacy, Live at Smalls (2014) – rec. October 16–17, 2012
- Peter Bernstein, Solo Guitar – Live at Smalls (2013) – rec. October 16–17, 2012
- David Schnitter, Live at Smalls (2012) – rec. November 11, 2012
- Will Vinson, Live at Smalls (2013) – rec. December 4–5, 2012
- David Berkman, Live at Smalls (2013) – rec. January 2–3, 2013
- Johnny O'Neal, Live at Smalls (2014) – rec. June 16, 2013
- Ian Hendrickson-Smith, Live At Smalls (2014) – rec. January 17–18, 2014
- Spike Wilner, Live at Smalls (2015) – rec. January – April 2014
- Mark Soskin Quartet, Live At Smalls (2015) – rec. January 16–17, 2015
