= Jason Crane =

American podcaster, writer, radio broadcaster, poet, activist and musician

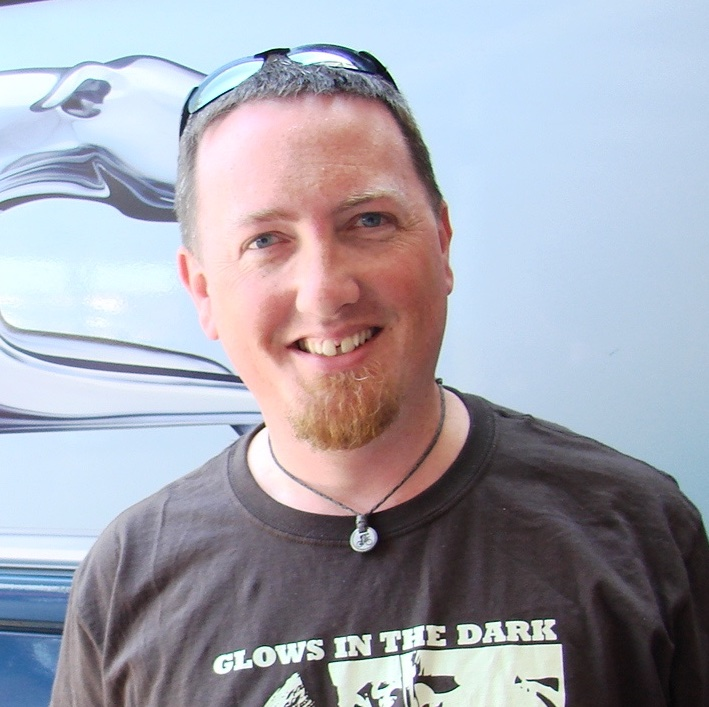
- Crane in 2012
- Born: 1973 (age 52–53)
- Occupations: Poet; podcaster; radio broadcaster; activist; writer; musician
- Writing career
- Notable works: The Jazz Session; Unexpected Sunlight
- Website: jasoncrane.org

Jason Crane is an American podcaster, writer, radio broadcaster, poet, activist, and musician. He interviews musicians on his podcast, The Jazz Session. He is also involved in local political activism.

== Career ==
Before 2001, Crane was Tokyo business correspondent for National Public Radio's Morning Edition, a newscaster for Bloomberg Radio Tokyo, and an on-air host for KUAT and KUAZ in Tucson, Arizona. He worked professionally as a soprano saxophonist in Arizona; Hilton Head, South Carolina; and Japan and as a union organizer.

In 2001, Crane served as operations producer of WXXI, the AM public radio affiliate serving the Rochester, New York area. Shortly afterwards, he joined the staff at WGMC Jazz 90.1 in Greece, New York, a suburb of Rochester. His first position at WGMC was development director and then, at 28, he stepped into the role of station manager until 2004. There, while also hosting an afternoon show, Traffic Jam, and running for city council (see Politics and Activism below), he oversaw the fundraising and installation of a new $120,000, 15,000-watt transmission tower, replacing the station's 2,000-watt tower. In Crane's last year there, JazzWeek bestowed a national award to WGMC as the best station among medium-sized radio markets.

While at WGMC, Crane interviewed over 200 jazz musicians including Claudia Acuna, Ben Allison, Karrin Allyson, Billy Bang, David Berkman, Gene Bertoncini, Bill Bruford, Jack DeJohnette, Kahil El'Zabar, Marty Erlich, Wycliffe Gordon, Benny Green, Fred Hersch, Bill Holman, Charlie Hunter, Norah Jones, Don Lanphere, Joe Locke, Les McCann, Bobby McFerrin, Ben Monder, Jane Monheit, David "Fathead" Newman, Houston Person, Bobby Previte, David Sanborn, John Scofield, Curtis Steigers, Tierney Sutton, Cuong Vu, Bobby Watson, Fred Wesley, Matt Wilson, and Nancy Wilson.

Crane says he left Jazz 90.1 to take a break from public life and work as a stay-at-home dad to his newborn son. In 2005 he took on a weekly gig hosting his own political show, The Jason Crane Show, on NewsTalk 950 WROC-AM in Rochester. The show, which featured an interview with Richard Dawkins, among others, eventually became a podcast.

In 2007 while living in Rochester, Crane created The Jazz Session, which was to become a long-running podcast featuring new interviews with jazz musicians. During that time, he contributed articles to the website All That Jazz and worked as union organizer for Unite Here in which capacity he was transferred to Albany, New York.

In 2010, Foothills Publishing published his first collection of poems titled Unexpected Sunlight. The publications Blue Collar Review, Poets for Living Waters, qarrtsiluni, State of Emergency: Chicago Poets Address The Gulf Crisis, and Meat For Tea have featured Crane's poetry.

In 2011, crane published a poetry zine called Daylight Robbery and had his Twitter account recommended in Culture Monster, then the arts-and-culture blog of the Los Angeles Times. By that time he had relocated to New York City.

In 2012, Crane lost his housing. In response, he executed a crowdfunding campaign and struck out on an interview tour for The Jazz Session during which he also presented local readings of his poetry at tour-stops in the US and Canada. Later that year, he relocated to one of those stops, Auburn, Alabama. In Auburn, he was an on-air personality for Auburn University's WEGL 91.1 and helped found and organize the Third Thursday Poetry Series at the Gnu's Room, a bookstore where he held a management position.

In 2013, his second crowdfunding effort for The Jazz Session allowed him to relocate to State College, Pennsylvania to be closer to family. There he was manager of Webster's Book Store and Cafe where he founded and organized Open Mike Poetry, a weekly poetry-reading series.

In 2015 he was on-air host for WKPS The Lion in State College. While living there, he produced First Laughs with Jason Crane, a podcast that chronicled his own efforts entering the field of stand-up comedy. He later worked as a DJ in State College for indie-rock station WFEQ The Freq, continuing through that station's switch to the country-music-format Big Froggy WFGE in 2019 and leaving soon after. In 2019, he launched the podcast A Brief Chat. In State College, he performed with the group Mantz, Chaplin & Crane with Jud Mantz and Lynn Chaplin.

Crane stated that in 2020, after having moved back to Tucson, his romantic partnership ended resulting in his decision to begin a nomadic period of van life for which he created an Instagram series called Vanarchism.

In 2023 Crane began working as program director and afternoon host for WCNR in Charlottesville, Virginia.

Crane advertises as a professional promotional writer, focusing his craft on artists and musicians.

== Politics and activism ==
Crane is a stated atheist, Buddhist, anti-capitalist, and anarchist. He has been an advocate for veganism and cycling, and has used The Jazz Session to advocate for the LGBTQ+ community. Aside from his union work, he has participated in party politics, organized protest events, and written publicly about his views.

In 2000, he worked as a volunteer for the Green Party in Monroe County, New York, as volunteer coordinator in 2001, and in 2002 as chairman. In 2003, he ran as the party's candidate in Rochester's city council election for the city's East District in the council's first contested election in 16 years. He won the endorsement of the Rochester Labor Council and brought in 17% of the vote, but ultimately lost to Democratic candidate Lois J. Giess.

In 2006, he was the leader of the 24th Legislative District (New York) Committee of the Monroe County Democratic Party.

In 2015, he informally organized a write-in campaign for the seat of Constable of the Borough of State College. He won the most write-in votes from the combined State College precincts with no other official candidate on the ballot.

In 2020, Crane published a series of short podcast episodes called 3 Minutes of Buddhism which is used as an online educational tool for Northeast Religious Resources in the United Kingdom.

In 2024 in the wake of the Gaza war, he organized a daily protest in Charlottesville in support of the Palestinian people.

== Education ==
Crane graduated high school in 1991 from Canandaigua Academy, then traveled to Japan as an exchange student sponsored by Rotary International. He later attended SUNY Potsdam.

== Personal life ==
Crane was born in Lenox, Massachusetts in 1973. He married Jennifer in 1996. They raised two sons. His grandfather, whom he says inspired his love for jazz, was Bernie Flanders.
