= Frank Hewitt (musician) =

American jazz musician

Frank Hewitt (October 23, 1935 – September 5, 2002) was an American hard bop jazz pianist.

== Life and career ==
Born in Queens, New York, Hewitt lived most of his life in Harlem. His mother was a church pianist, and he initially studied classical and gospel music, but switched to jazz after hearing a Charlie Parker record. He took the bop pianists Thelonious Monk, Bud Powell and Elmo Hope as his role models. In the 1950s and 1960s, he worked with Howard McGhee, Cecil Payne, John Coltrane, Dinah Washington and Billie Holiday, among others; in 1961, he also participated in the Living Theater's production of Jack Gelber's The Connection. He became a regular figure in the circle of the pianist Barry Harris. In the 1990s, Hewitt became a central figure at New York's Smalls Jazz Club; aside from playing there several nights a week, he sometimes also ended up using the walk-in refrigerator as a place to bunk when times were rough.

During his lifetime only one track of Hewitt's playing was released, a version of the Kenny Dorham tune "Prince Albert" on the compilation Jazz Underground: Live at Smalls (Impulse, 1998). After Hewitt's death, however, recordings made by Luke Kaven began to surface on Kaven's Smalls Records label: the trio discs We Loved You, Not Afraid to Live, Fresh from the Cooler, and Out of the Clear Black Sky, and the quintet date Four Hundred Saturdays. His reputation as a neglected jazz master has steadily grown among fans of bebop piano.
