= Random Gender =

British progressive garage band

- Random Gender in 1986: left to right – Richard Hughes, Simon Cousins, Pat D’Arcy, Jon Cousins, Myke Vince

Background information
- Also known as: The So!
- Origin: Wiltshire, England
- Genres: Punk rock (early), garage rock (mid period), prog rock (later), progressive garage
- Years active: 1982–1986
- Labels: New Age Press-Publishing; Ophiuchvs Records
- Members: Jon Cousins, 1982–1986; Simon Cousins, 1982–1986; Mark Dunn, 1982; Richard Pearson, 1982; Myke Vince, 1982–1986; Mark Nochols, 1983; Ed Deedigan, 1982–1983; Richard Hughes, 1983–1986; Jane Hicks, 1984; Pat D’Arcy, 1984–1986
- Website: http://www.myspace.com/randomgender https://www.youtube.com/user/randomgender

Random Gender were a British, Wiltshire-based progressive garage band, founded in 1982 by twin brothers Jon and Simon Cousins, who went on to be prominent members of Wiltshire folk rockers Ophiuchus and Liverpool's indie rock group The Onset respectively. Although Random Gender remained unsigned to any major record label they attracted a great deal of attention "thanks to their musical skill and professionalism in advertising", leading to write-ups in the national music press.

"Music and humour have caused some unhappy marriages, Jilted John, the Barron Knights, and most recently Billy Connolly. Music without humour can be equally short lived and unbearable. A mixture of the two comes as naturally to Random Gender as does their capacity to fuse the 80’s beat consciousness with the more laid back aspects of the Velvet Underground era"

– Mark Ashton (Venue Magazine).

Random Gender was formed in June 1982 when Chippenham-based punk rock group The So! announced that they had changed their name. The So! was formed in September 1978 by three 13-year-old school friends from Wiltshire's Grittleton House School: twin brothers Jon and Simon Cousins on guitar and bass respectively, and Andrew Hawker on expletives and vocals. In 1980, they were joined by drummer Dave Clifford, later to replace Mark Ollard as drummer for Red Jasper. The So! drew their inspiration from Punk bands such as the Skids, Sex Pistols and the Stranglers. Their set included punked-up versions of rock and roll standards such as "Get Back", "Rock Around the Clock" and the Stone's "(I Can't Get No) Satisfaction", although from the beginning the Cousins brothers were writing their own material. Nevertheless, very few gigs were played and even fewer recordings remain, but a recording of The So! performing "Rock Around The Clock" was placed on MySpace in 2009.

The summer of 1981 saw the departure of Andrew Hawker and David Clifford when the band members left school and went their separate ways. In October 1981, whilst at sixth form in Chippenham's Sheldon and Hardenhuish Schools, the Cousins brothers teamed up with Mark Dunn on keyboards/drums and Richard Pearson on guitar/drums. The group practiced in the cellar of Mark's parents house on Chippenham's London Road, developing an underground garage sound from self-penned tunes and covers of T. Rex, David Bowie and Lou Reed.

Myke Vince joined the band in the Spring of 1982 and in June the local press carried the story that the band had changed its name. The Wiltshire Gazette and Herald ran with 'So... it's Random Gender.' In the article Jon Cousins explains "the new name was Myke’s idea and the rest of us think it suits our image better." The name came from the Ultravox song "My Sex", composed by John Foxx.

However, not all the band were happy with the new name and the Wiltshire Gazette and Herald of 29 July 1982 reported that "The bands line up is now Mike Vince (drums), Richard Pearson (guitar), Simon Cousins (bass and vocals) and Jon Cousins (rhythm guitar and vocals)." The article reported on the "Gig in the Barn at Sevington Farm", 10 July 1982 where an audience of 150 people saw Random Gender perform their first show at the north Wiltshire home of the Cousins brothers' mother and stepfather, Judith and Roger Pope.

Poster advertising the first Gig in the Barn at Sevington Farm, 10 July 1982

With the departure of Mark Dunn, Random Gender moved their base to Sevington Farm, where they adapted an outhouse into their practice room. Shortly after the move, Random Gender recorded The Blue Set demo at The Practice Room. This tape included their signature tune, the haunting "My Death" written by Jon Cousins about the events in Poland in 1981/2 when the government introduced martial law in an attempt to crush the Solidarity movement. At this time the Cousins brothers also began working with local Chippenham songwriter Eddie Deedigan in the Triangle project.

During October 1982, Richard Pearson left Random Gender and on 4 November 1982 the Wiltshire Gazette and Herald reported that "guitarist Eddie Deedigan has replaced Richard Pearson." Eddie Deedigan introduced a folk influence to the band's music, which was an influence that grew in prominence in the Cousins brothers song writing and became the main genre of Random Gender's successors, Ophiuchus.

In spring on 1983, Random Gender recruited keyboard player Mark Nochols. The band played their second "Gig in the Barn at Sevington Farm" on 30 April 1983. It is believed the audience exceeded 400, with special busses being laid on from nearby towns of Chippenham and Calne for the night. The show was a massive success, establishing Random Gender as a band, but also marked the departure of both Mark Nichols and Eddie Deedigan from the line up. Eddie Deedigan would later go on to form the band Circus with Tom Aitkenhead and Damon Albarn of Blur.

Earlier that Spring, the Cousins brothers had starred in a sixth form production of Tom Stoppard's Rosencrantz and Guildenstern Are Dead at Sheldon School. Other members of the cast included Gender guitarist Eddie Deedigan and keyboard player Richard Hughes, who was recruited that summer to replace Mark Nichols.

In the summer of 1983, Myke Vince's father John Vince, a lecturer at Corsham Art College in Wiltshire, began to act as Random Gender's manager. John Vince encouraged the band to develop as artists, producing their own posters, arranging photo shoots, engaging with the media and expanding their musical expression. In an interview for Wiltshire Gazette and Herald in 1985 he explained his passion for the band: "They have a depth to their music that a lot of young bands lack" adding that "Their music is well thought out, tight and professional."

In October 1983, Random Gender were in the studio for the first time recording their second demo The Foxhole Sessions. This session as the name implies, was recorded at the Foxhole Studio in Wick between 8 p.m. and midnight on 13 October. The Demo had four of the band's original numbers, including a new version of "My Death", now with keyboard arrangement by Richard Hughes, and the track Stage, written after the experience of their acting debut.

On 25 January 1984 Random Gender played on the bill at Richard Branson's Goldiggers Club in Chippenham. They proved so popular that they were given a gig in their own right in April. The Goldiggers gig was reported in The Wiltshire Gazette and Herald which interviewed Jon, Myke and Richard. Jon stated, "It’s the first time a local band has played at the club in their own right and not as a support act for someone else."

In June, the band were recording for the second time, this time in Frank Aust's studio in Bath, where they cut two track;"Night and Day / The Journey", which were released as a demo single. At the same time the band were playing regular gigs in Bristol and Bath and had become a six piece as was reported in the Chippenham News on 27 July 1984. "The line-up now includes Jane Hicks (dance, vocals and percussion) and it has been joined at some recent gigs by Pat D’Arcy (Saxophone)." Jane Hick was the Drama Teacher at Sheldon School in Chippenham and had been the director of the production of Rosencrantz and Guildenstern Are Dead the year before. She had approached the band to ask them if she could join on a temporary basis in order to get an equity card. Pat D’Arcy had been travelling from Stafford at the weekends to play sax with the band since meeting them in the Spring, whilst working in Wiltshire.

The band's gig at Bath's St. James Wine Vaults on 20 July 1984 was a critical success attracting a number of reporters from different publications. Simon Kinnersley, of the Bath and West Evening Chronicle, wrote "The most arresting feature of their music is the inclusion of a sax, which not only beefs up their sound, but seems to pump the whole thing along and make them much more distinctive and varied", Dave Massey of Sounds added that "there was a hint of the Beatles circa '66 and, more odd, something of Roxy '72-'74 ." and Mark Ashton of Venue Magazine summed up Random Gender as "well worth watching, fizzy, flippant and sunny side up."

A week later the band were back in the studio working on "The Man with the Face", which was recorded on 26 July 1984 in Yate, Avon. This is the only Random Gender recording to feature Jane Hick who performed backing vocals. At this time Jon Cousins also began to work on a solo project inspired by the Celtic mythology of the Welsh Nation, "The Mabinogion: The Mabinogi of Math 'Ab Mathonwy and the Sons of Don" . The ten songs of the Mabinogion were recorded at Robert Craven's studio in Bath during July and August 1984. Jon enlisted the help of his girlfriend Rachel Bowen on recorder, Jane Hicks' husband Andy on flute and his brother Simon on various instruments. Three of the songs – The Sin, The Death of Pryderi, and The Punishment, featured a full Random Gender line up of Jon Cousins, Simon Cousins, Myke Vince and Richard Hughes.

In the August 1984 Jane Hicks qualified for her Equity card and left the band, leaving the five members of its final line up: Jon Cousins, guitar and vocals; Simon Cousins, bass and vocals; Myke Vince on drums and vocals; Richard Hughes, keyboards and vocals; and Pat D’Arcy on saxophone and vocals.

Random Gender became a firm favourite at Bristol's The Thekla, which was run by Ki Longfellow and her husband Vivian Stanshall, who is best known as the singer with the Bonzo Dog Doo Dah Band. Among Random Gender's regular audience members at The Thekla was the actor David Rappaport, who would take great delight in introducing them onto stage.

31 December 1984 saw Pat D’Arcy and Simon Cousins travelling to Stafford to play at a New Year's Eve bash with Pat's friend Pete Haycock from the Climax Blues Band. Earlier that month, 12 December 1984, Random Gender played their first gig at the Granary Club in Bristol, supporting The Harpoons and Automatic Dlamini. The latter featured an unknown PJ Harvey as their lead singer. Random Gender returned to the Granary as the headline act on 18 April 1985.

On 14 March 1985 the band played their first gig at Peewee Hunt's Real Ale Bar in Trowbridge. Sue Hampton of the Wiltshire Gazette and Herald attended the show and reported that the band "won over the audience with their light refreshing style of music." The band were asked to return for another gig in May 1985, with Peewee's becoming one of the band's regular gigs throughout the rest of their career. 15 April 1985 saw Random Gender's first appearance at another prestigious venue, Moles Night Club in Bath, Somerset. This gig was reviewed by Mark Ashton of the Venue Magazine who called them "an oddball mix of present, past, taste, trend, fad and fun."

Random Gender worked hard throughout the summer with Simon Kinnersly of Bath and West Evening Chronicle commenting that "They’ve been seen in almost every venue in the area, gradually consolidating their reputation and improving their style and sound. So much that they’re one of the best bands around." During this time the band also made their final appearance at Chippenham's Goldiggers on 27 August 1985 "playing at the mini Live Aid show" Concert for Ethiopia. At the concert they were reunited with Eddie Deedigan who was compere for the nine-hour special. Also on the bill were Bobby McVay, Loose Ends and Princess. The event raised £5,000 for the appeal.

Random Gender playing at the Swindon Live Aid Fun Day, 21 September 1985

In the late summer of 1985 the Random Gender returned to Robert Craven's Studio in Bath to record their third version of "My Death", this time with the saxophone of Pat D’Arcy, who had made the move from Stafford to Wiltshire and consolidated his place in the group. Also joining the band at this time was Liverpool's electronics wizard, Glen Wardle who became their regular Sound Engineer.

Random Gender appeared in the final of the Wiltshire Music for Today competition at Salisbury Arts Centre on 15 September 1985. Their appearance at the event was covered by the Wiltshire Gazette and Herald and the Chippenham Times and News. The Gazette and Herald recorded that the competition "winners were the Calling from Swindon, Random Gender came second." Both papers ran a story that the band had been offered a trip to Europe as a consequence of their Live Aid appearance at Goldiggers. The Gazette and Herald with the headline, "German tour offered band on the upbeat." The Times and News stating that "The band were spotted by an agent who offered them a tour of Germany next month." Whether this was a clever piece of marketing or a real story seems unclear, however, the tour of Germany never materialised, instead they played a short tour of Staffordshire later that month.

Random Gender's first and only airplay came by virtue of their appearance at Swindon's Live Aid fun day on 21 September 1985. They were playing in the background as the roving reporter on GWR Radio made occasional contact with the DJ on the Saturday afternoon broadcast. The Wiltshire Gazette and Herald reported that Random Gender "played for free" and "that £300 was raised from the event."

In the autumn of 1985, Random Gender returned to Robert Craven's studio in Bath to record what turned out to be their last session. They produced one track, "Chain to Break", with a view to making their first single. In an interview with Five Minutes Magazine the band discussed their plans to secure sponsorship and their concerns to keep artistic control. Jon Cousins expressed the bands position "To get any further, we can only do that if we’ve got some sort of backing. We need somebody who is going to sponsor us but who doesn’t want to change us." Random Gender found a financial backer in Wiltshire businessman John Senior Stern who agreed to put up the finances for a single. The group began negotiations with Pete Haycock who agreed to be their producer on the project. They provided him with tapes of all of their songs and Pete Haycock chose in Search of the East and My Death as the two songs for the single.

In the spring of 1986, Random Gender teamed up with photographer Martin Tom Sawyer to do a photo shoot for the single cover at Sevington Farm. A draft cover was developed, but the band broke up before there was a chance for the single to be produced. A new band, Ophiuchus rose out of the ashes of Random Gender, and it was this band that went on to record their first single Serpent and the Bearded King with Pete Haycock as producer. The original line up of Ophiuchus included the Cousins Brothers and Pat D’Arcy. But this was short lived with Simon Cousins leaving to join Mike Badger who formed The Onset in December 1986. In addition to Jon Cousins and Pat D’Arcy, ex-Gender members Myke Vince and Glen Wardle both played with Ophiuchus and appear on the "Serpent" single, which was released in 1987.

== Discography ==
- The Foxhole Sessions Demo EP (1983)
- "Night and Day / The Journey" Demo Single (1984)
- "The Man with the Face" Demo Single (1984)
- The Mabinogion Demo Album (1984)
- "My Death" Demo Single (1985)
- "Chain to Break" Demo Single (1985)
