= Simon Cousins =

- Born: Simon Frederick Cousins; 17 January 1965 (age 61); Bath, Somerset, England
- Occupation: Singer-songwriter
- Instruments: Vocals, guitar, piano, bass guitar
- Years active: 1979–present
- Labels: Probe Plus, Generator, Ophiuchvs Records
- Website: Simon Cousins Website

Simon Cousins (born Simon Frederick Cousins, 17 January 1965, Bath, Somerset, England) is an English singer-songwriter and musician, who was a member of Liverpool indie country rock band The Onset and folk rockers Ophiuchus. He studied music at the Liverpool Music College and has a degree in philosophy from Liverpool University. His solo work is in an acoustic, folk / country genre, described by Tim Peacock of Whisperin and Hollerin' online magazine as "showcasing a fluid finger-picking style and a gentle, unobtrusive voice which nonetheless carries a determined presence." Seph Ong of Glasswerk National stated that Cousins' songs were "derived from real life experience" and that as a performer he "presents a series of tales that gradually unravel to build a story of the mystery of life." Cousins performed at the Glastonbury Festival, Pilton, England, in 2010, 2011 and 2016.

== Career ==
=== Ophiuchus ===
In 1986, Si Cousins was a founder member of the Progressive Folk Rock outfit Ophiuchus. Simon Jones writing in Folk Roots commented that "Ophiuchus weave their own dreamy, rustic idyll." The Venue Magazine billed them as "The best thing out of Wiltshire that isn't made by Wadsworth." Although he left Ophiuchus in 1987, Cousins has a cameo appearance as a Guest Snare Drum Player on their Debut LP; Pronounced Offee-ick 'Cus, released on Probe Plus Records in 1989.

=== The Onset ===
In January 1987, Cousins moved to Liverpool to join Mike Badger, the founder of Liverpool's Britpop band The La's, who was working with guitarist Dan Dean to develop an indie/country/roots sound as The Onset. The band was described by Pete Frame, author of Rock Family Trees, as "The most arresting group in captivity – younger than yesterday, fresher than tomorrow". Mike Badger called their sound as "a sort of Punk Cajun". This appealed to Geoff Davies the legendary Record Producer of Liverpool's Probe Plus Label, who signed up the band stating they were "Irresistible salad of rootsy pop... Lovely stuff, warm, human, spiritual, compassionate.".

=== Solo performer ===
Since the Onset folded in 1995, Simon Cousins has continued to write songs, developing as an acoustic guitarist with an intimate vocal style and poignant lyrics. He recorded at Pat D'Arcy's studio during the 90s and with Jon Cousins on the Liberty Blake sessions in 2008. His recordings with The Onset continue to be released through Probe Plus, The Viper Label and Mike Badger's Generator Label.

In 2009, Cousins began performing live after a 13-year hiatus. He has played concerts throughout the UK including the famous Cavern Club Liverpool (May 2010) and the Members Room, St Helens Town Hall (June 2010). Tim Peacock from Whisperin' and Hollerin' Online Magazine reviewing Cousins' music stated "There's a mission to both soothe your soul and quietly sweep you off your feet going ahead here, so you'd be foolish not to succumb."

In April 2010, Si Cousins joined his brother Jon to reform Ophiuchus with fellow members, Pat D'Arcy (Saxophone), Glenn Wardle (Hammer Dulcimer), Pete Causer (Melodeon), Richard Hughes (Piano Accordion), Xavier Tutien (Bass), Myke Vince (Drums), Jack "WestWayy" Cousins (Percussion), Mike Slater (Cruel Driver) and Dick (Mumming Memento Mori). The Group had not played together for 23 years. In an interview with journalist Nick Cook, Cousins commented that "planning rehearsals with band members in Chippenham, Swindon, Bristol, Glastonbury, Liverpool and Paris was a logistical nightmare.". The reformed band played on the Bandstand Stage at the Glastonbury Festival of Contemporary Performing Arts on Sunday, 27 June 2010.

On 1 June 2011, the Liverpool Echo announced that Cousins was to return Glastonbury as a solo artist to play four shows at the 2011 Glastonbury Festival. Cousins' shows were in the Green Futures Field where he played the Tadpole Stage on Wednesday 22 June and the Mandala Stage on Thursday 23rd, Saturday 25th and Sunday 26 June.

Cousins' first solo single, Love's Counterfeit, was released on 11 November 2011. The song received its first radio play on Radio Merseyside's 'Tony Snell in the Morning' show on 20 June 2011. Cousins is reported to have decided to release the song because of its popularity at Glastonbury Festival. Love's Counterfeit was released as a digital download format through iTunes.

In the summer of 2012 Cousins collaborated with his brother Jon to record and produce their Father, Allan Cousins performing his song "A Lonely Dream" at the age of 78. Cousins played piano on the track and his brother played guitar, also featured was Simon Cousins' daughter Olivia, who played bass guitar and harmonium. "A Lonely Dream" was released as a download single on 31 August 2012. In an interview with the Wiltshire Gazette and Herald about the release, Cousins stated "To me it is very special to have a record of us all playing together for the future."

Cousins released his first solo LP "Given Songs" on 1 May 2014. It contained 9 self penned songs and was the first album to be issued on his Misericordia Label. Its sister album "Forgiven Songs" was released on 15 June 2016. Ian D. Hall, in his review for Sound and Vision online magazine, called Forgiven Songs "a natural and beautiful successor to the 2014 Given Songs", stating that Cousins "brings home everything that you could possibly desire from the acoustic world and plants [an] abundant musical garden with dedication and security."

Cousins returned to Glastonbury Festival in 2016 to mark the 30th anniversary of the formation of Ophiuchus. He performed with members of Random Gender and Ophiuchus on the Bandstand Stage on Friday 24 June, and played three gigs in the Green Futures Field on Saturday 25 June. These included a solo performance, and an appearance with Hawkwind's Nik Turner and Pink Fairies' Jaki Windmill on the Mandala Stage.

Cousins’ third album "The Lark and the Blackbird" was released on 31 August 2018. Described in Folk Roots magazine as "a laid back collection of originals, trad:arr and covers." The album was launched at Chris and Hughie Jones’ Everyman Folk Club in Liverpool on 13 November 2018.

Cousins' fourth album "Myriad Of Colour" was released 27 September 2022. The album was launched on the same day at Maghull Folk Club with the support of the Myriadal Orchestra of musicians who contributed to the album. Described in London Folk Magazine as "Lyrics full of ancient terminology conjure up images of this past way of life." and "arrangements featuring trumpet, guitar, whistle and violin, all working beautifully together, enhancing Simon's gentle and melodious voice."

== Discography ==
=== Solo ===
- Love's Counterfeit – Simon Cousins, Single (2011), Misericordia
- Given Songs – Simon Cousins, CD (2014), Misericordia (SCOU1)
- Forgiven Songs – Simon Cousins, CD (2016), Misericordia (SCOU2)
- The Lark And The Blackbird – Simon Cousins, CD (2018), Misericordia (SCOU3)
- Myriad Of Colour – Simon Cousins, CD (2022), Misericordia (SCOU4)

=== The Onset ===
- The Pool of Life – The Onset, LP (1988), Probe Plus (PROBE19)
- What Say You – The Onset, EP (1990), Furious Fish Records (Onset1)
- The Pool of Life Revisited – The Onset, CD (1994), Probe Plus (PROBE40)
- Liverpool Cult Classics Unearthed - Volume Two – Various Artists, CD (2001), The Viper Label (Viper009)
- The Onset – The Onset, CD (2005), The Generator Label (Gen10)
- Revolutionary Spirit: The Sound Of Liverpool 1976-1988 – Various Artists, CD (2018), Cherry Red (CRCDBOX39)

=== Ophiuchus ===
- Pronounced Offee-ick Cuss – Ophiuchus, LP (1989), Probe Plus (PROBE23)

=== Mike Badger ===
- Lo Fi Acoustic Excursions by Mike Badger & Friends – Mike Badger CD (2004), The Generator Label (Gen09)
- Lo Fi Electric Excursions by Mike Badger & Friends – Mike Badger, CD (2006), The Generator Label (Gen11)
- Mike Badger's Country Side – Mike Badger, CD (2008), The Generator Label (Gen12)
- Badger Tracks – Mike Badger, CD (2013), The Generator Label (Gen14)
