= The Rhythm & The Tide =

2015 book on The La's and Mike Badger

- Cover
- Authors: Mike Badger; Tim Peacock
- Language: English
- Genre: Autobiography
- Publisher: Liverpool University Press
- Publication date: October 16, 2015
- Publication place: United Kingdom
- Media type: Print
- Pages: 288
- ISBN: 9781781382585

The Rhythm & The Tide (Liverpool, The La's And Ever After) is a 2015 book chronicling the early years of band The La's and the City of Liverpool in the 1980s, as well as being an autobiography of Mike Badger's life and career. Co-written by Tim Peacock the book was released October 16, 2015 in Liverpool.

== Description ==
"Liverpool in the 1980s. With prospects for the city’s youth bleak, a scheme for unemployed musicians began which inadvertently shaped the future for the members of Cast, Space, the Lightning Seeds and gave fresh impetus to the idea of song as a savior for the city. Foremost of the bands to emerge from this ill-fated scheme was The La’s. Inspired by a chance meeting with Captain Beefheart, Mike Badger formed the band with the enigmatic Lee Mavers. First they conquered the city, and then on the brink of hitting the big time, and eventually inspiring what would become Britpop. Badger quit to form Americana pioneers, The Onset, find international recognition as a sculptor, produce album art and videos for some of the country’s biggest bands, before finally co-founding Liverpool’s Viper record label (which has recently released its 100th album). Featuring everyone from Arthur Lee to Frank Sidebottom, Jonathan Richman to Half Man Half Biscuit, and above all with new insights into the early years of the great lost Liverpool band, The La's, The Rhythm and the Tide is both the personal story of a restlessly creative individual, and a reflection on the ebb and flow of the music scene in the city that he loves." The book is often described as a respected and fair representation of a somewhat undocumented musical period with Louder Than War calling it "the last great untold story in that glorious musical lineage", and Record Collector referring to it as "The hitherto untold story of the founder of The La’s".
