= Mexican R'n'B =

Studio album by The Stairs
- Released: 25 May 1992
- Genre: Rock
- Length: 57:17
- Label: Go! Discs
- Producer: Peg Majoly

Professional ratings
Review scores
Source	Rating
AllMusic	4/5 stars

Mexican R'n'B is the debut album by English rock band The Stairs. It was released in 1992 on Go! Discs in the UK and, in a shorter format, on London Records in the United States. The album was issued in the following formats: 12" vinyl LP, CD, and cassette.

== Track listings ==
UK 12" Vinyl - 1992

Go!Discs LP - 828 315-1

Side One

1. "Mary Joanna" – 2:38
2. "Mr Window Pane" – 3:47
3. "Out in the Country" – 2:15
4. "Laughter in Their Eyes" – 4:25
5. "Sweet Thing" – 2:22
6. "Russian R'n'B (The World Shall Not Be Saved)" – 2:47
7. "Right in the Back of Your Mind" – 7:22

Side Two

1. "Mexican R'n'B" – 0:41
2. "Mundane Mundae" – 2:11
3. "Wrap Me Round Your Finger" – 3:04
4. "Weed Bus" – 2:13
5. "Woman Gone and Say Goodbye" – 3:19
6. "Sometimes the World Escapes Me" – 4:41
7. "Fall Down the Rain" – 7:24

UK CD - 1992

Go!Discs CD - 828 315-2

1. "Intro" – 0:13
2. "Mary Joanna" – 2:38
3. "Mr Window Pane" – 3:47
4. "Out in the Country" – 2:15
5. "Laughter in Their Eyes" – 4:25
6. "Sweet Thing" – 2:22
7. "Russian R'n'B (The World Shall Not Be Saved)" – 2:47
8. "Right in the Back of Your Mind" – 7:22
9. "Flying Machine" – 3:25
10. "Mexican R'n'B" – 0:41
11. "Take No Notice of the World Outside" – 1:45
12. "Mundane Mundae" – 2:11
13. "When It All Goes Wrong" – 2:04
14. "Wrap Me Round Your Finger" – 3:04
15. "Weed Bus" – 2:13
16. "Woman Gone and Say Goodbye" – 3:19
17. "Sometimes the World Escapes Me" – 4:41
18. "Fall Down the Rain" – 7:24
19. "Outro" – 0:26

USA CD - 1992

1. "Weed Bus" – 2:13
2. "Mary Joanna" – 2:38
3. "Mr Window Pane" – 3:47
4. "Sometimes the World Escapes Me" – 4:41
5. "Flying Machine" – 3:25
6. "Out in the Country" – 2:15
7. "When It All Goes Wrong" – 2:04
8. "Woman Gone and Say Goodbye" – 3:19
9. "Sweet Thing" – 2:22
10. "Laughter in Their Eyes" – 4:25
11. "Take No Notice of the World Outside" – 1:45
12. "Mexican R'n'B" – 0:41
13. "Russian R'n'B (The World Shall Not Be Saved)" – 2:47
14. "Right in the Back of Your Mind" – 7:22

In January 2019 a deluxe edition of Mexican R'n'B was issued by Cherry Red Records. The three CD set encompasses all The Stairs' output during their time served with Go! Discs. The last disc features the music which would have been their second LP, hotly tipped at the time to be named Who Is This Is.

== Singles ==
- "Weed Bus"
- "Woman Gone and Say Goodbye"
- "Mary Joanna"

== Personnel ==
- Edgar Summertyme – vocals, bass guitar
- Ged Lynn – guitar, vocals
- Paul Maguire –drums
- Jason Otty – harmonica
