= Mike Badger's Country Side =

Compilation album by Mike Badger & Friends
- Released: 2008
- Label: Generator

The Onset chronology
Lo Fi Electric Excursions (2006)	Mike Badger's Country Side (2008)

Mike Badger's Country Side is an album which features a compilation of Mike Badger's country style songs from 1988 to 2008, including previously unreleased material from his solo projects and his back catalogue with The Onset. It was released on the Generator Label in 2008.

== Track listing ==
1. The Mystery of Life - The Onset (1994) - 3:12
2. Trees and Plants - The Onset (1993) - 2:17
3. Ashtrays and Tables and Barstools - Mike Badger (2007)* - 3:33
4. The Cowboy and His Wife (original version) - The Onset (1993)* - 2:52
5. Clear Night For Love - Mike Badger 2000 - 2:52
6. Another Mans Crime - The Onset (1993) - 3:36
7. They're Animals - Mike Badger 2008* 2:57
8. Two Times Forgotten Man (original version)- The Onset (1993)* - 2:51
9. Waking up In The City - Mike Badger 1998* - 2:06
10. Daddy's Inside - Mike Badger 2000 - 2:38
11. Some Things - Mike Badger 2007* - 2:51
12. Let's Go Home - The Onset (1988) - 3:04
13. Dig It! - Mike Badger 2007* - 1:48
14. The Mansion on the Hill (live) - The Onset (1991)* - 2.29

(* Previously unreleased)
All words and music by Mike Badger, except
Track 5 Roky Erickson;
Track 8 Mike Badger, Danny Dean;
Track 14 Hank Williams/Rose arr. Danny Dean;

== Musicians ==
Mike Badger - vocals, acoustic guitar, electric guitar, Jews harp
Danny Dean - lead guitar (tracks 2, 4, 6, 8, 12 and 14)
Simon Cousins - bass guitar, backing vocals (tracks 1, 12 and 14)
Paul Hemmings - electric guitar, lap steel guitar (tracks 5, 8, 10 and 14)
Tony Russell - drums (tracks 1, 2, 12 and 14)
Roger Llewellyn - backing vocals, banjo, fiddle, harmonica (tracks 1, 2, 4, 6, 8 and 12)
Bernard Nolan - bass guitar, double bass, fiddle (tracks 2, 4, 6 and 12)
Brian Morrow - congas (tracks 2 and 4)
Chris Marshall - double bass (tracks 3, 11 and 13)
Tony McGuigan - drums (tracks 3, 11 and 13)
Barry Southern - acoustic guitar, dobro, banjo (tracks 3, 11 and 13)
Martyn Campbell - bass guitar, backing vocals (tracks 5, 10 and 13)
Henry Priestman - accordion (track 9)
Paddy "Loose Moose" - fiddle (track 3)
Chris Sharrock - drums (tracks 5 and 10)
Sue Dring - backing vocals (track 12)
Sheila Seal - backing vocals (track 2)
Dave "Hillsider" Rowlands - pedal stel guitar (track 1)

== Reviews ==
"The view from 'Mike Badger's Country Side' is frequently breathtaking. You really should catch it while you can."
Tim Peacock (Whisperin and Hollerin).
