= The Pool of Life Revisited =

The Pool Of Life Revisited

Studio album by The Onset
- Released: 1994
- Label: Probe Plus

The Onset chronology
The Pool Of Life (1988)	The Pool Of Life Revisited (1994)	Liverpool Cult Classics Unearthed - Volume Two (2001)

The Pool Of Life Revisited is the second album released by Mike Badger and The Onset and their first on CD. It was released by the Probe Plus Label in 1994.

== Track listing ==
1. Rakin 'Em Down – 0.19
2. The Taker (2nd take) – 2:57
3. The Cowboy And His Wife – 3:11
4. Precious Love – 2:33
5. Talkin' Space Travel Blues – 1:32
6. Too Proud To Start – 2:38
7. Trees And Plants – 2:16
8. Glad Rags – 1:30
9. Mansion On The Hill – 2:36
10. The Pool Of Life – 1:30
11. For You – 3:18
12. Two Times Forgotten Man – 2:42
13. Poor And Lonely Girl – 2:56
14. Starlight Tuneful 9 – 1:51
15. Another Man's Crime – 3:35
16. Let's Go Home – 3:05

All words and music by Mike Badger, except:

Tracks 3, 12 and 13 by Mike Badger/Danny Dean
Track 1 by Mike Badger/Roger Llewellyn
Track 9 by Williams/Rose arr. Danny Dean

== Production and recording ==
- Produced by Bald Brothers and The Onset
- Engineered by Colin McKay and Mike Harvey
- Tracks 1,4,5,6,9,10,11,16 recorded May 1988 at Ameritz (Birkenhead)
- Tracks 2,3,7,12,13,15 recorded October 1993 at The Bus Stop (Leigh)
- Tracks 8,14 recorded February 1994 at Ian Broudie's (Liverpool)

== Musicians ==
- Mike Badger – vocals, guitar, jaw harp
- Danny Dean – lead guitar on tracks 2,3,4,6,7,9,11,12,13,14,15,16
- Tony Russell – drums on tracks (2,3,4,6,7,9,11,12,13,16); percussion on track 11
- Simon Cousins – backing vocals on tracks 1,9,11,16; bass on tracks 4,6,9,10,11,16; whistle on track 9
- Paul Hemmings – slide guitar on tracks 5,9,12; mandolin on track 13
- Roger Llewellyn – backing vocals on tracks 2,3,13,15; banjo on tracks 1,3,6,7,9,13,16; harmonica on tracks 14,15; fiddle on tracks 2,12,15; melodica on track 4
- Sue Dring – backing vocals on tracks 9,16
- Bernard Nolan – fiddle on tracks 4,9,11,16; bass on tracks 2,3,7,12,13,15
- Nick Hrydowy – mandolin on tracks 6,11
- Brian Morrow – percussion on tracks 2,3,7,13
- Shelia Seal – backing vocals on tracks 7,12,13

== Reviews ==
"Unlike most Country/Rockabilly, you think you've heard a million times before, the Onsets' humour and deep heart felt compassion creates an original vibe anointing whosoever feels utterly languid with a new knowledge."

— Billy Doherty (Groove Magazine)

"The album oozes with a mixture of styles and textures to appeal to all emotions; guaranteed to make you want to stomp your feet, slap your thighs, smile and sigh all at the same time. For Blues and Country freaks it's an absolute must-For any other freaks… you'd probably enjoy it too!"

— Jonathan Street (Shout Magazine)
