= Liverpool Cult Classics Unearthed – Volume Two =

Liverpool Cult Classics Unearthed - Volume Two

Compilation album by various artists
- Released: 2001
- Label: The Viper Label

The Onset chronology
| The Pool Of Life Revisited (1994) | Liverpool Cult Classics Unearthed - Volume Two (2001) | Lo Fi Acoustic Excursions (2004) |

Liverpool Cult Classics Unearthed – Volume Two is the second in a series of three volumes from the Viper Label of rare and unreleased songs by famous and not so famous Liverpool bands. Volume Two was released in 2001 and includes tracks by The Teardrop Explodes, Deaf School and The Onset.

== Track listing ==
1. "Kardomah Cafe" - The Cherry Boys - 3.05
2. "Freezer Burn" - Telefone – 2:30
3. "Smile Now" - C-Stripey – 2:48
4. "Run Of The Dove" - The Last Chant – 5:46
5. "Camera, Camera" - The Teardrop Explodes – 2:55
6. "Ding, Dong" - Deaf School – 2:46
7. "Did You See Her?" - Pink Military – 3:00
8. "The Harbour Song" - Palais De Sand – 4:12
9. "Precious Love" - The Onset – 2:32
10. "The Night Song" - The Transparent Band – 1:35
11. "Up On The Ceiling" – Rain - 3:06
12. "Angels" - The Vernons – 4:27
13. "Astral Girl" - The White Capsule – 4:42
14. "When You Fly" - The Moondogs – 2:50
15. "Naive" - The Room – 4:38
16. "Rings Of Saturn" - The Sex Gods – 5:48

== Reviews ==
"The Viper label returns with another sixteen tracks dug up from the last quarter century or so of Liverpudlian past. No La's this time around, but Mike Badger's The Onset do offer up an unabashed love song in their stead."

- Jo-Ann Greene (AllMusic)
