= Ophiuchus (disambiguation) =

Ophiuchus is a constellation.

Ophiuchus may also refer to:

- Ophiuchus Supercluster, a supercluster of galaxies
- Ophiuchus (astrology), sometimes used in sidereal astrology as a thirteenth constellation
- Ophiuchus (band), a folk roots rock group from Castle Combe, Wiltshire, England
- Ophiuchus Shaina, a manga character
