= The Onset (album) =

Studio album by The Onset
- Released: 2005
- Label: Generator

The Onset chronology
Lo Fi Acoustic Excursions (2004)	The Onset (2005)	Lo Fi Electric Excursions (2006)

The Onset is the third album released by Mike Badger and The Onset. It was released by the Generator Label in 2005. The CD presents a selection of songs recorded during the period 1989 to 1994.

== Track listing ==
1. First I Feel You – 3:00
2. I Do What I Can – 3:44
3. Sun And Moon – 2:44
4. Rhapsody – 3:06
5. Walking Tall – 3:24
6. Set For Destruction – 3:28
7. Touch The Moon – 3:16
8. The Mystery Of Life – 3:11
9. Endless Sun – 3:00
10. You're Not Alone – 4:13
11. The Factory – 2:23
12. Where Love Is – 4:36

All words and music by Mike Badger, except
Tracks 1 and 3 by Mike Badger, Simon Cousins, Danny Dean, Paul Hemmings, Tony Russell;
Track 7 Mike Badger, Paul Hemmings;
Tracks 11 and 12 Mike Badger, Paul Hemmings, Danny Dean

Produced by The Onset except track 1 Produced by Dave Dix
Engineered by Colin McKay, Mike Harvey and John Dooley

Tracks 3, 9 and 11 - 1989
Track 1 - 1990
Track 7 - 1991
Tracks 2, 10 and 12 - 1993
Tracks 4, 5, 6 and 8 - 1994

== Musicians ==
Mike Badger - vocals, acoustic guitar
Danny Dean - backing vocals, lead guitar
Simon Cousins - backing vocals, bass guitar, percussion
Paul Hemmings - guitar, mandolin
Tony Russell - drums, percussion
Roger Llewellyn - banjo, fiddle, whistle, harmonica
Sheila Seal - vocals (track 5 and 6)
Bernard Nolan - bass guitar (tracks 2, 10 and 12)
Dave Dix - Hammond organ (track 1)
Henry Priestman - organ (track 6)
Dave Rowlands - pedal steel guitar (track 8)

== Reviews ==
"This is a young precocious album shot through with good old scally suss."
Mick Middles (Record Collector)

"There's not a weak track nor a less than brilliant jewel to be found within this set. The Onset at their grandest, and an album that will leave listeners desperate for more."
Jo-Ann Greene (allmusic)

"That these songs should have had to wait so long to see the light of day seems criminal, but regardless of its posthumous status you can rest assured it's one of the best albums you should actively make the effort to discover for yourself..."
Tim Peacock (Whisperin and Hollerin)
