= The Pool of Life =

Studio album by The Onset
- Released: 1988
- Label: Probe Plus

The Onset chronology
The Pool of Life (1988)	The Pool of Life Revisited (1994)

The Pool of Life is the first album released by English band The Onset. It was released by Probe Plus in 1988. The album takes its name from one of the many nicknames of Liverpool, the home city of both the band and the Probe Plus label.

== Track listing ==
All words and music by Mike Badger, except "Mansion on the Hill" by Williams/Rose arr. Danny Dean.

Side one

1. Rakin 'Em Down – 0.19
2. The Taker – 3:48
3. For You – 3:18
4. Down at the Space Rocketry – 2:16
5. Peace Chain – 2:00
6. In The Red – 2:22
7. Moon Bather – 2:15
8. Glad Rags – 1:18

Side two

1. Crying Shame – 3:02
2. Too Proud To Start – 2:38
3. The Pool of Life – 1:30
4. Mansion on the Hill – 2:36
5. Precious Love – 2:33
6. Rockin Out The Depression – 2:23
7. Talkin' Space Travel Blues – 1:32
8. Let's Go Home – 3:05
- Produced by Bald Brothers, Mike Badger and Simon Cousins.
- "Down at The Space Rocketry" produced by Jon Cousins and Simon Cousins.
- Engineered by Mike Harvey and John Dooley

Recorded May 1988 at the Ameritz Studio (Birkenhead)

== Musicians ==
- Mike Badger - vocals, guitar, Jews harp
- Danny Dean - lead guitar, backing vocals
- Simon Cousins - backing vocals, bass, whistle
- Paul Hemmings - slide guitar
- Tony Russell - drums, percussion
- Roger Llewellyn - banjo, melodica, harmonica
- Sue Dring - vocals
- Bernard Nolan - fiddle
- Nick Hrydowy - mandolin
- Hamish Cameron - moonbeam guitar

== Reviews ==
"One of the more original of local groups... The Onset's debut LP, on Probe Plus, manages to combine hippy sentiments with gusty catchy roots music, from rock 'n' roll to country to space age talking blues. As befits a record called The Pool of Life. it manages to mix humour, compassion and style with a background of inner city reality and a slice of idealism. It all works even better on stage, with singer Mike Badger (the coolest thing in the original La's lineup) introducing a song as "the only country song Pink Floyd ever did" one minute and the next claiming everything they do was written by Hank Williams (one of them was). The LP's pretty good value with sixteen diverse tracks. The live shows are just as good."
Penny Kiley (Liverpool Echo)

"Really and truly, all the Hillbilly carpings are one of the finest things that Probe Plus have delivered-this irreverent bunch must be a dream band"
Simon Jones (Folk Roots)

"Dedicated to Rainbow Warriors, Freedom Fighters and Sun Dancers, The Pool of Life explores the World, the Universe and everything else, from war games to starving children, through the love of God to more human weaknesses. It is the sparsest of sounds that an eleven piece band can make - soft country accapella with lifting blues harmonica. The Pool of Life makes no harsh demands, it merely suggests that you listen. The soft shoe shuffle of tracks like Precious Love, the hard edge of Rockin Out The Depression, The Pool of Life proves to be a worldly Hobos' guide to the galaxy."
Cathi Unsworth (Sounds)
