= Edgar Jones (musician) =

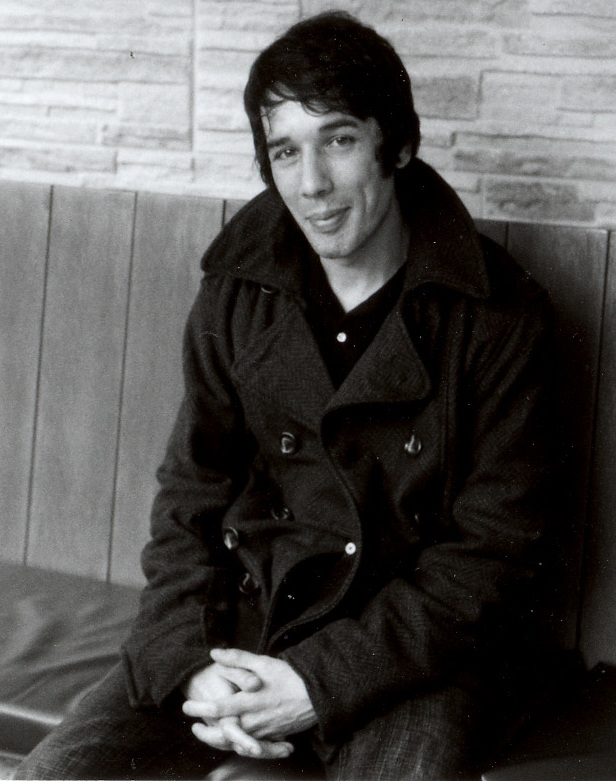
- Edgar Jones in Tokyo in 2007

Background information
- Also known as: Edgar Summertyme, Peg Majoly, Edgar "Jones" Jones
- Born: Edgar William Jones; 4 December 1970 (age 55); Liverpool, England
- Genres: English beat, blues rock
- Occupations: Singer-songwriter, musician
- Instruments: Vocals, bass, guitar, keyboards
- Years active: 1990–present
- Labels: Go!, Imaginary, Viper, Loud Soul

Edgar William Jones (born 4 December 1970), also known as Edgar Summertyme, is an English singer-songwriter and musician. Jones was originally the bass player and singer-songwriter for the Stairs and has since formed and fronted the Isrites, The Big Kids, Edgar Jones & the Joneses and Free Peace. He has also played as a session musician for several artists, including Ian McCulloch, Paul Weller, Saint Etienne and Ocean Colour Scene.

== Career ==
=== Early career: to 1994 ===
Jones was born in Liverpool. With Ged Lynn and Paul Maguire, he formed The Stairs, a 1960s-oriented band with English beat, garage rock, blues rock and psychedelic influences. The band's manager, Jason Otty, would often play harmonica, and the band would later feature 2nd guitarists Carl Cook and Daniel Kearney before splitting in 1994. The band achieved cult status with the album Mexican R'n'B (1992).

=== 1995–2001: The Isrites and the Big Kids ===
Jones also formed The Isrites with Sean Payne, later of the Zutons, Paul Maguire's younger brother Dave and Luke Goldberg, later of Book and the Big Kids again with Sean Payne and Russell Pritchard, later of The Zutons, and Howie Payne of The Stands. Although both bands split before releasing anything, material has since been issued on several compilations by The Viper Label.

=== 2002–2011: Edgar Jones & the Joneses and Free Peace ===
Having ditched the Summertyme pseudonym, Edgar released his first solo album as Edgar "Jones" Jones in 2005 entitled Soothing Music for Stray Cats which encompassing elements of jazz, R&B, soul and doo wop and was recorded on a portastudio donated by Johnny Marr. Edgar followed the album up with Gettin' a Little Help from The Joneses, backed by The Joneses, in 2007 and The Masked Marauder in 2009.

Jones formed Free Peace in August 2008 with his nephew Nick Miniski and guitarist Stuart Gimblett. An EP was released via gigs, mail orders and independent record shops in Liverpool, and they were recording they debut album, which was set to be released on their label, Loud Soul, in October 2009. The band saw Jones return to the 3-piece rock sound of The Stairs, and they had reportedly finished about 20 songs for their debut album. Despite regularly gigging, including major support slots with Oasis, the band split up with an album entitled "Stormy Weather" released under the name "The Edgar Jones Free Peace Thing" in September 2011 on the Viper label over a year after the band disbanded.

=== 2012–present: Solo work ===
Under Edgar Summertyme, Jones released his fourth solo album, Sense of Harmony, in 2012.

In November 2015, Jones reunited with The Stairs, who later released a collection of rare recordings on The Viper Label.

In April 2016, Jones's Soothing Music For Stray Cats was reissued on limited edition vinyl via The Viper Label and Mellowtone Records.

In July 2016, Jones put together a backing band for Johnny Echols of Love, for a show at Sefton Park dubbed From Liverpool With Love featuring guest vocalists such as John Power, Dave McCabe and Nick Ellis.

Jones's solo record, entitled The Song Of Day and Night, was released in 2017 on Skeleton Key Records. Jones put together a touring band, dubbed 'The New Joneses' and toured the UK with fellow Skeleton Key acts, headlining the Kristian Ealey Stage at Smithdown Road Festival in Sefton Park's Palmhouse.

=== Collaborations ===
Since the break-up of the Stairs, Jones has worked with Ian McCulloch on Mysterio (1992), Paul Weller (live and appears on Live at the Royal Albert Hall DVD, 2000), Johnny Marr in an early version of the Healers (where he was replaced by Alonza Bevan previously of Kula Shaker), Saint Etienne, Cherry Ghost on their Thirst For Romance (2007) and Lee Mavers following the departure of John Power from the La's.

== Associated acts ==
Years active	Act
1990–1994	The Stairs: Edgar Summertyme – vocals, bass, guitar, keyboards (1990–1994); Ged Lynn – backing vocals, guitar (1990–c. 1993); Paul Maguire – drums (1990–1994); Carl Cook – guitar (c. 1993/1994); Daniel Kearney – guitar (c. 1993/1994); Jason Otty – backing vocals, harmonica (c. 1990/1993)
1995–1998	The Isrites: Edgar Summertyme; Luke Goldberg; Dave Maguire; Sean Payne
1999–2001	The Big Kids: Edgar Summertyme – vocals, guitar; Howie Payne – guitar; Russell Pritchard – bass; Sean Payne – drums
2003–2008	Edgar Jones & the Joneses: Edgar Jones – vocals, bass (2003–2008); Kristian Ealey – vocals (2003); Candie Payne – vocals (2003); Mike Marshall – guitar (2003–2004); Nick Miniski – drums (2003–2004); Paul Molloy – guitar (2005); Jamie Backhouse – guitar (2005–2008); Austin Murphy – saxophone, guitar (2005–2008); Grenville Harrop – drums (2005–2006); Hugo Harrison – double bass (2005–2006); Robert Stringer – piano (2005–2008); Karl Penney – drums (2006–2008); Paul Blakesley – bass, double bass (2006–2008)
2008–2010	Free Peace: Edgar Jones – vocals, bass; Stuart Gimblett – guitar; Nick Miniski – drums

== Discography ==
=== Studio albums ===
Title	Details
Mexican R'n'B (as The Stairs)	1st The Stairs album; Released: 25 May 1992; Label: Go! Discs; Format(s): CD, LP
Soothing Music for Stray Cats (as Edgar "Jones" Jones)	1st solo album; Released: May 2005; Label: Viper; Format(s): CD, download; Reissued 2016; Label: Viper & Mellowtone Records; Format(s): LP
Gettin' a Little Help from The Joneses (as Edgar "Jones" Jones)	2nd solo album; Released: July 2007; Label: Viper; Format(s): CD, download
The Masked Marauder (as Edgar Jones & Friends)	3rd solo album; Released: March 2008; Label: Viper; Format(s): CD, download
Who Is This Is (as The Stairs)	2nd The Stairs album; Released: August 2008; Label: Viper; Format(s): CD, download
Stormy Weather (as The Edgar Jones Free Peace Thing)	1st Free Peace album; Released: 18 September 2011; Label: Viper; Format(s): CD, download
Sense of Harmony (as Edgar Summertyme)	4th solo album; Released: 16 August 2012; Label: Viper; Format(s): CD, download
Morphic Fields (as Edgar Summertyme)	5th solo album; Released: 28 October 2013; Label: Viper; Format(s): CD, download
The Song of Day and Night (as Edgar Jones)	6th solo album; Released: 14 April 2017; Label: Skeleton Key; Format(s): CD, download
Reflections of a Soul Dimension (as Edgar Jones)	7th solo album; Released 28 April 2023; Label: Steropar; Format(s): CD, LP, download

=== Compilation albums ===
Title	Details
Right in the Back of Your Mind (as The Stairs)	The Stairs compilation album; Released: 6 June 2006; Label: Viper; Format(s): CD, download
Keep It On: The Isrites & Big Kids Sessions 1995–2000 (as Edgar Summertyme)	The Isrites and The Big Kids compilation album; Released: 15 July 2013; Label: Viper; Format(s): CD, download
The Way It Is: 25 Years of Solo Adventures (as Edgar Jones)	Compilation album; Released: 22 January 2021; Label: Cherry Red; Format(s): CD, download

=== Singles & EPs ===
- Weed Bus (1991) (as The Stairs)
- Woman Gone And Say Goodbye (1992) (as The Stairs)
- Mary Joanna (1992) (as The Stairs)
- Last Time Around (1992) (as The Stairs)
- I'm Bored (1999) (as The Big Kids)
- More than You've Ever Had! (2006) (as Edgar Jones & the Joneses)
- The Way It Is (2007) (as Edgar Jones & the Joneses)
- Mellow Down Pussycat! (2007) (as Edgar Jones & the Joneses)
- Free Peace EP (2009) (as Free Peace)

=== Compilation appearances ===
- 1965: Through the Looking Glass (1992) – "Moonchild" (as The Stairs)
- Unearthed: Liverpool Cult Classics, Vol. 1 (2001) – "Skin Up for Me Baby" (as The Stairs)
- The Great Liverpool Acoustic Experiment (2002) – "Mister Can You Tell Me? " (as Edgar Summertyme)
- Unearthed: Liverpool Cult Classics, Vol. 3 (2004) – "Keep It On" (as The Isrites)
- 21st Century Liverpool Underground (2005) – "I'm Bored", "Too Much Baby", "For a Moment", "Up to No Good Again", "Hot Potatoes", "Hey, Hey, Now, Now" (as The Big Kids)

=== Session discography ===
- Ian McCulloch – Mysterio (1992)
- Saint Etienne – Sound of Water (2000)
- Ocean Colour Scene – Mechanical Wonder (2001)
- Cherry Ghost – Thirst for Romance (2007)
- Black – The Given (2009)
- Mike Badger – Rogue State (2011)
