= The Bandits (band) =

UK musical group

- Origin: Liverpool, England
- Genre: Alternative rock
- Years active: 2001–2004; 2025
- Labels: Centro Del Blanco, B-Unique
- Past members: John Robinson; Gary Murphy; Scott Dulson; Tony Dunne; Neil Crosby; Dave Sweeney; Ritchie Taylor

The Bandits were an English blues rock band from Liverpool. They are most notable for the singles "Take it and Run" and "2 Step Rock", which both reached the Top 40 on the UK Singles Chart.

== History ==
The band's first appeared on the Honey Records' 2001 "Beatin Planks" compilation album, which featured early versions of two songs: "Take It An Run" and "Free Me Rain". The line up at the time consisted of John, Gary, Scott and Tony, with Neil Crosbie on drums. Scott Dulson and Tony Dunne had previously been in Tramp Attack with future Zutons frontman Dave McCabe. The band then brought in Swee on drums, and throughout 2002 auditioned for a lead guitarist and recruited Ritchie, who lived in Wallasey at the time.

The Bandits signed a record deal with Warners and released a succession of singles throughout 2002 and 2003, before releasing their only album 'And They Walked Away'.

The Bandits also ran their own club night in Liverpool, The Bandwagon, which became relatively popular and helped launched the careers of The Coral, The Zutons, The Hokum Clones, The Stands, Tramp Attack and the band themselves. The club night was known for its wild west style posters and stickers, designed by Scott. Bandwagon nights, usually held at The Zanzibar Club on Seel Street often sold out, and featured some of the days' most prominent bands, including The Libertines and others.

Following months of rumours, the band's split was confirmed in July 2004, with rhythm guitarist Gary stating "I really do believe that we'll record something again in the future. We're all just doing different things at the moment".

== Post-split ==
John Robinson, Gary Murphy and Scott Dulson played a handful of gigs, doing reggae covers as The Bum Notes with Nick Miniski (ex-The La's, later of Free Peace) on drums. Robinson, Dulson and Miniski then went on to form The Pedantics with Stu Gimblett (also later of Free Peace with Edgar Jones and Miniski) Tony Dunne went on to play a few gigs with The Sweetcorns, he later rejoined Tramp Attack in 2007 following a break from performing.

John Robinson co-wrote and played on the song "I Am the Rain" from Pete Doherty's solo album Grace/Wastelands (2008) and Robinson and Murphy joined Doherty on stage during his solo tour in 2008-9, most notably during Doherty's Glastonbury festival slot.

Gary Murphy went on to work at Starwood Management (home to The Kooks and The Ordinary Boys and run by former Mansun and Cast manager Rob Swerdlow), and was involved in the early career of Candie Payne. In 2011, Gary Murphy played a series of stripped back shows with Lee Mavers of The La's, with Murphy accompanying on bass. Murphy now manages Liverpool groups The Stamp & Queen Zee and The Sasstones

During John Robinson's solo acoustic show in Liverpool in March 2014 at The Baltic Social, he was joined by guitarist Gary Murphy to perform 'Take It and Run' and '2 Step Rock' accompanied by Pedantics drummer Nick Miniski.

Gary Murphy, now Irish rock band Inhaler’s tour manager, made a deal with frontman Elijah Hewson that if they headlined the M&S Bank Arena, he would “get the band back together”. On October 11th 2025, Inhaler played one of their biggest headline shows ever at the arena with The Bandits and Scottish rock band The Snuts as opening acts.

== Members ==
- John Robinson – vocals (2001–2004)
- Gary Murphy – rhythm guitar (2001–2004)
- Scott Dulson – bass guitar (2001–2004)
- Tony Dunne – keyboards (2001–2004)
- Neil Crosby – drums (2001)
- Dave Sweeney – drums (2002–2004)
- Ritchie Taylor – lead guitar (2002–2004)

== Discography ==
=== Albums ===
- And They Walked Away (2003) #115 (UK)

=== Singles ===
Year	Title	Peak chart positions
Year	Title	UK
2002	"The Warning"	-
2002	"Once upon a Time"	-
2003	"Take It and Run"	32
2003	"2 Step Rock"	35
