= The Cherry Boys =

English new wave band

The Cherry Boys were an English new wave band from Liverpool, England. The Cherry Boys formed in 1980. They are most notable for the single "Kardomah Cafe", which missed the UK Singles Chart, but was a top 10 hit in Spain.

== Career ==
The band consisted of John Byrne (a.k.a. John Cherry) on vocals and guitar, James Hughes on vocals and keyboards, Keith Gunson on vocals and bass, and Howie Minns on drums. Icicle Works drummer Chris Sharrock was part of the band early on, and appeared on their first single "Man to Man."

The Cherry Boys achieved a significant local following. They won the BBC Radio Merseyside award for Best Local Band in 1982. In the same year they also won best band (and individual musician awards) in the local popular magazine, The End. The band signed with Satril and released four singles and an E.P entitled "Give It Rice".

Despite missing the top 50 in the UK,"Kardomah Cafe" proved popular in Spain, peaking at number 6 in the Spanish charts in 1984. More recently the song was featured on the compilation album Liverpool Cult Classics Unearthed - Volume Two, released by the Viper Label in 2001. It also appeared on the five disc set Scared to Get Happy: A Story of Indie-Pop 1980-1989 (2013).

Following the band's split in 1984, Hughes and Minns went on to form Exhibit B (which released the "It’s Hypothetical" single, and album Playing Dead, which was re-released in Japan in 2007). Hughes is now the main writer/musician in the James Clarke Five, whose album, Fly My Pretties Fly!, was released in 2008. John Byrne, the band's chief songwriter, joined The La's and played lead guitar on their international hit "There She Goes". Byrne is now an acclaimed classical guitarist. Chris Sharrock (the original Cherry Boys drummer) also joined The La's at the same time. Sharrock had previously played with The Icicle Works and subsequently, Lightning Seeds, The Robbie Williams Band and Oasis.

The Cherry Boys' manager, Graham Jones, became an author with his first book Last Shop Standing, which was published in 2009. The book deals with the demise of the independent record store, and features a chapter dedicated to his experiences managing both The Cherry Boys and Exhibit B. This includes the explanation of the phrase "Give it rice": Keith Gunson would shout this during performances to urge on his bandmates. Jones then decided to encourage fans to throw rice at the group at gigs, until the mess produced began to deter venues from booking them.

== Discography ==
- "Man to Man" b/w "So Much Confusion" 7″, Open Eye (1981)
- "Give It Rice (Cassette E.P) Open Eye (1982)
- "Only Fools Die" b/w "Come The Day" 7″, Cherryoza (1982)
- "Kardomah Café" b/w "Airs and Graces" 7″/12″, Crash (1983)
- "Shoot The Big Shot" b/w "Falling" and "Don't Leave Me That Way" 12″, Crash (1983)
- "Kardomah Café" b/w "Airs and Graces" & "Plead Sanity" 12″, Satril, (1984)

== Bibliography ==
- Schwartze, Klaus. The Scouse phenomenon: the scrapbook of the new Liverpool rock scene. Birkenau: Bitsch, 1987. ISBN 978-3-925014-04-8
- Jones, Graham. Last Shop Standing. London: Proper Music. 2009. ISBN 978-0-9561212-0-2
