= Soothing Music for Stray Cats =

Studio album by Edgar "Jones" Jones
- Released: 9 May 2005
- Recorded: The Mansions, Liverpool and The Griffins Nest, Liverpool.
- Genre: R&B, jazz, doo-wop, soul, funk
- Length: 45:23
- Label: The Viper Label CD029 (UK) / Wind Bell (Japan)
- Producer: Edgar Jones assisted by Velvet Young and Grenville Harropp.

Soothing Music for Stray Cats is the debut solo album by the Liverpudlian musician, songwriter and singer Edgar "Jones" Jones. It was released on 9 May 2005 on The Viper Label. It combined a number of musical styles including jazz, rock and roll, doo-wop, soul, R&B and funk, across the instrumentals and songs that comprise the album.

All tracks were written by Jones, except "It's My Bass", which was written by The Isley Brothers. The song "Freedom" contained an interpolation of "Moonlight Serenade" by Glenn Miller and lyrics by Charles Mingus, and "Tenderly" contained an interpolation of "Blue Monk" by Thelonious Monk.

Noel Gallagher of Oasis said of the album, "It bent my head, man. It's probably one of the best records I have ever heard".

== Track listing ==
1. "Soothing Music for Stray Cats" – 2:36
2. "Do Doh Dontcha Doh" – 2:08
3. "What's Goin' Down Huny Brown" – 3:09
4. "Hangin' with Wulf and Bear" – 1:25
5. "Freedom" – 1:59
6. "Sittin' on the Fence" – 4:01
7. "More Than You've Ever Had" – 2:16
8. "Stubborn Mule Blues" – 3:54
9. "You Know You Can Do It" – 2:48
10. "Catnip" – 3:49
11. "Tenderly" – 3:22
12. "Gonna Miss You When You're Gone" – 4:22
13. "It's No Good" – 3:08
14. "Oh Man That's Some Shit" – 3:24
15. "It's My Bass" – 3:02
16. "Did You Ever Wake Up in the Morning" (hidden track)

== Japanese release ==
The Japanese edition of Soothing Music For Stray Cats, issued on 6 January 2006 on the 'Wind Bell' label (catalogue #WB5), has different artwork to the UK release and contained additional bonus live tracks:

1. "Further On Up The Road"
2. "You Know You Can Do It"
3. "Gonna Miss You When You're Gone"
4. "More Than You've Ever Had"
5. "Do Doh Dontcha Doh/Freedom"

== 2016 Vinyl Reissue ==
The Vinyl Reissue edition of Soothing Music For Stray Cats was issued on 6 April 2016, as a collaboration with The Viper Label and Mellowtone Records. It features the same front cover, but slightly amended artwork to the original UK cover.

1. "Soothing Music for Stray Cats"
2. "Do Doh Dontcha Doh"
3. "What's Going' Down Huny Brown"
4. "Hangin' with Wulf and Bear"
5. "Freedom"
6. "Sittin' on the Fence"
7. "More Than You've Ever Had"
8. "Stubborn Mule Blues"
9. "You Know You Can Do It"
10. "Catnip"
11. "Tenderly"
12. "Gonna Miss You When You're Gone"
13. "It's No Good"
14. "Oh Man That's Some Shit"

== Personnel ==
In addition to Jones, the following individuals are credited in the album sleeve notes:

- Grenville 'The Griffin' Harrop – drums, tracks 1,2,6,9,10,11,12, 13,15
- Nicholas Miniski – drums, tracks 5,7.
- Osmond St.Clair (AKA Austin Murphy) – tenor saxophone, tracks 1,11 and Baritone sax on 11.
- Martin Smith – flugelhorn on track 1
- Paul Molloy – lead guitar on tracks 10 and 12.
- Rachel Harland – lead vocal track 9 and backing vocal track on 13
- Rob 'Bobby Swinger' Stringer – keyboards track 5
- Candie Payne – backing vocals on 5 and 8
- Kristian Healey – backing vocals on track 5
- The Joneses – backing vocals on track 9
- Mick Marshall – second guitar track 5

All other guitars, percussion, basses, backing vocals and lead vocals by Jones
