= Flying machine (disambiguation) =

Flying machine is an archaic, early term for an aircraft.

The term flying machine may also refer to:

- Flying Machines s.r.o., Czech aircraft manufacturer

== Film, television and literature ==
- "The Flying Machine" (short story) (1953), by Ray Bradbury
- The Flying Machine (film) (2011), starring Heather Graham
- "The Flying Machine" (Strange Planet episode) (2023)

== Music ==
- The Flying Machine (band), British pop group, late 1960s, known for "Smile a Little Smile For Me"
- The Flying Machine, U.S.-American band with James Taylor, that released the single "Night Owl" in 1967
  - James Taylor and the Original Flying Machine, a compilation album
- "Flying Machine", 1971 single by Cliff Richard
- "Flying Machine", song by The Stairs from their 1992 album Mexican R'n'B

== See also ==
- Aircraft
- History of aviation
