= Kristian Ealey =

English actor

- Born: 21 November 1977; Lancashire, England, UK
- Died: 3 May 2016 (aged 38); Italy
- Occupations: Actor, musician
- Years active: 1986–2016
- Children: 1

Kristian John Ealey (21 November 1977 – 3 May 2016) was a British actor and musician. He was best known for starring in the soap operas Brookside from 1998 to 2000 and Hollyoaks from 2000 to 2004 playing Matt Musgrove. He died in his sleep at the age of 38 on 3 May 2016.

== Career ==
Ealey was born in Liverpool. While growing up, he appeared in an episode of Bread at the age of nine. More than ten years passed before he got his big break appearing as regular Matt Musgrove in the Channel 4 soap Brookside from 1998 to 2000. The character appeared again in another soap Hollyoaks until 2004. He also appeared in the spin-offs Hollyoaks: Indecent Behaviour in 2001 and Hollyoaks: After Hours in 2004. The latter was to be his last appearance in the show.

At this time, he was also working as a musician, becoming the lead singer and guitarist in Liverpool band Tramp Attack. Following this he joined the band Edgar Jones and the Joneses. In 2000, he played Ringo Starr in the television movie In His Life: The John Lennon Story.

== Death ==
Ealey died suddenly in his sleep on 2/3 May 2016 while in Italy. He had reportedly been complaining of a pain in his arm before he went to bed but further details have yet to be released. The actor was 38 at the time of death and was father to a son, Jake. His death hit headlines on many national newspapers and websites with tributes from friends and former colleagues.
