= Lo Fi Acoustic Excursions by Mike Badger & Friends =

Lo Fi Acoustic Excursions

Compilation album by Mike Badger & Friends
- Released: 2004
- Label: Generator

The Onset chronology
Liverpool Cult Classics Unearthed - Volume Two (2001)	Lo Fi Acoustic Excursions (2004)	The Onset (2005)

Lo Fi Acoustic Excursions is the first of two albums released by Mike Badger featuring a compilation of his various musical incarnations including the La's and The Onset, its sister album being Lo Fi Electric Excursions. Lo Fi Acoustic Excursions was released by the Generator Label in 2004. It contains a collection of songs, outtakes, ideas and sketches from 1983 to 2003.

== Track listing ==
All words and music by Mike Badger, except track 5 by Bob Nolan; track 11 by Mike Badger and Paul Hemmings.

1. "2022 Blues" - The Onset (1994) – 1.56
2. "It's True" - Mike Badger and The Establishment" (2001) – 3:05
3. "Save Me" - The Onset (1991) – 3:46
4. "South End Hoedown" - The Two Step Angels (1987) – 1:14
5. "Cool Water" - The La's (1986) – 3:57
6. "Sacramento" - Mike Badger (1999) – 0:40
7. "Lovin' On Our Side" - Mike Badger and the Northern Lights (2002) – 2:29
8. "Intermission" - Mike Badger and T.V.Set (1995) – 2:09
9. "No Bitterness Holds Sweetness" - Mike Badger (2000) – 2:36
10. "Walking Tall" - The Onset (1995) – 3:03
11. "Autumn In The Mind" - Mike Badger (1998) – 3:01
12. "Water Tiger" - Mike Badger (2001) – 1:15
13. "Dig It" - The Renegades (2002) – 2:23
14. "Life Story" - Mike Badger and the Northern Lights (2003) – 3:41
15. "The Day I Grew Forever" - Roy G Biv (1983) – 2:22

== Musicians ==
- Mike Badger - vocals, Spanish guitar, acoustic guitar, percussion, T.V.
- Danny Dean - acoustic guitar, twelve string guitar (tracks 3, 7, 10 and 12)
- Simon Cousins - bass guitar, acoustic bass, backing vocals (track 3 and 10)
- Paul Hemmings - piano, organ, acoustic guitar, mandolin, bass (tracks 2, 3 and 11)
- Tony Russell - percussion (track 10)
- Roger Llewellyn - backing vocals, ukulele banjo, harmonica, banjo, voice jug (tracks 1, 4 and 10)
- Steve Roberts - backing vocals (track 12)
- Lee Mavers - acoustic guitar, backing vocals (track 5)
- Martyn Campbell - backing vocals, bass, percussion, acoustic guitar (tracks 2, 7 and 14)
- Henry Priestman - organ, keyboards (tracks 9, 11 and 14)

== Reviews ==
While supposedly "lo-fi" recordings can sometimes be responsible for 'alternative' music's most heinous crimes, in Mike Badger's capable hands, these excursions are usually intriguing at least and always crackling with passion and soul.

— Tim Peacock, Whisperin and Hollerin (March 2004)
