= Revolutionary Army =

Revolutionary Army can refer to:

== Groups ==
- Army of the Revolution, a Syrian rebel alliance.
- Continental Army, United States army during the Revolutionary War.
- Cuban Revolutionary Army, the current ground forces of Cuba.
- French Revolutionary Army, French land forces during the French Revolutionary Wars.
- Kampuchea Revolutionary Army, military of Cambodia during the rule of the Khmer Rouge.
- National Revolutionary Army, the military wing of the Chinese Kuomintang party and the regular army of China during the party’s rule.
- Serbian Army (revolutionary), the military of the Serbian Revolution.

== Fiction ==
- Revolutionary Army, an organization in One Piece.

== Music ==
- Revolutionary Army of the Infant Jesus, an experimental music collective.

== Written material ==
- The Revolutionary Army, a Chinese pamphlet.
