= Tramp Attack =

English rock band

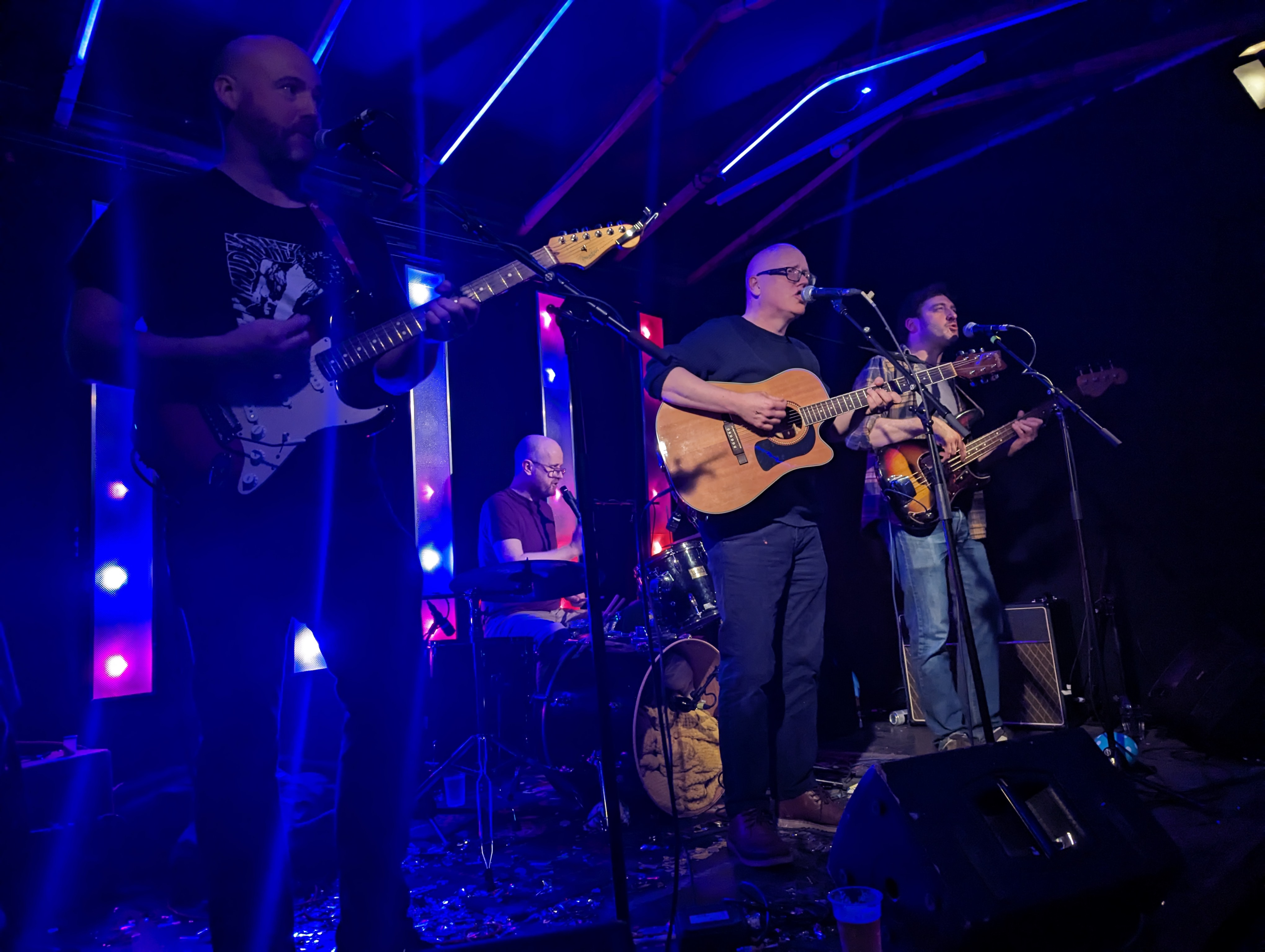
- Tramp Attack performing in 2024

Background information
- Origin: Liverpool, England
- Genres: Rock
- Years active: 2000–2001, 2003–2011, 2023–present
- Labels: Honey, Must Destroy, Viper, AV8
- Members: Matt Barton; Barry Southern; Chris Marshall; Ian Lane; Tony Dunne; Chris Pickering
- Past members: Kristian Ealey; Scott Dulson; Tony Dunne; James Redmond; Dave McCabe

Tramp Attack are an English rock band from Liverpool.

== History ==
Tramp Attack formed in Liverpool in 2000 by Hollyoaks and Brookside actor Kristian Ealey, Matt Barton, drummer Ian Lane, bassist Scott Dulson and guitar player Tony Dunne who left early on to form The Bandits.

Dulson was replaced by James Redmond and Dunne was replaced by Dave McCabe. After quickly gaining an enthusiastic and loyal fanbase, the band secured residencies in the pubs and clubs of Liverpool and went on to win a Battle Of The Bands at The Royal Court.

The band released their debut single 'Rocky Hangover' written by Redmond and McCabe in 2001 on Honey Records. The single was produced by Rob Ferrier at Great Northern Studios with B sides 'Broken Man'(written by McCabe) and 'Ladybird' (written by Redmond). Soon after the release of the single, the band split with Dave McCabe going on to form The Zutons and Kristian Ealey working with Edgar Jones in an early lineup of his 'Edgar Jones & the Joneses' band with Candie Payne.

Matt Barton and Ian Lane continued working together as The Mother Lovers, and released 'Rex' under that name on 'The Great Liverpool Acoustic Experiment' compilation album in 2002. After recruiting Chris Marshall and Barry Southern, the duo renamed themselves Tramp Attack and gigged regularly across Liverpool, including several shows at The Bandwagon night held at The Zanzibar. Liverpool at the time was attracting much interest from record labels large and small, and Tramp Attack proceeded to release records through the London-based Must Destroy record label, such as the band's first album 'Attack, Attack, Attack...'

In the summer of 2006 the band's second album 'Call In Sick' was released on The Viper Label. Following a brief break-up at the start of 2007 the band returned to record a new set of songs adding Tony Dunne back into the line up on keyboards. Tramp Attack continue to perform throughout the city of Liverpool and further afield, such as at the Coniston Festival.

In May 2016, former vocalist Kristian Ealey died aged 38 in Italy.

In January 2022, the track 'Oh! When the Sun Goes Down' from the album 'Attack, Attack, Attack...' was featured during the opening titles of the first episode of the BBC drama The Responder.

In April 2022, the band self released an album compiled of previously unreleased recordings titled 'I Got Lost Down the Back of My Couch'.

Former bassist, James Redmond released his debut solo album titled Video City 2 in April 2023 through AV8 Records Ltd. It features both Ian Lane and Dave McCabe.

== Band members ==
=== Current members ===
- Matt Barton (a.k.a. Jack Russel) – vocals, guitar (2000–present)
- Ian Lane (a.k.a. Son of John) – drums (2000–present)
- Chris Marshall (a.k.a. Mr. Bravestar) – bass (2002–present)
- Barry Southern (a.k.a. The Ship's Cat) – guitar (2002–present)
- Tony Dunne (a.k.a. Antoine Deschamps) – guitar (2000–2001), keyboards (2007–present)
- Chris Pickering (a.k.a. Johnny Cashpoint) – guitar (2004, 2008, 2023–present)

=== Former members ===
- Kristian Ealey – vocals (2000–2001)
- Scott Dulson – bass (2000)
- James Redmond – bass (2000–2001)
- Dave McCabe – guitar, vocals (2000–2001)

== Discography ==
=== Albums ===
- Attack! Attack!! Attack!!! (2004)
- Call in Sick (2006)

=== Singles ===
Year	Title	Peak chart positions	Album
Year	Title	UK	Album
2001	"Rocky Hangover"	–	Non-album single
2003	"Eight Years Since School"	122	Attack! Attack!! Attack!!!
2003	"Oh! When the Sun Goes Down"	94	Attack! Attack!! Attack!!!
2004	"1471"	86	Attack! Attack!! Attack!!!

=== Compilation appearances ===
- The Great Liverpool Acoustic Experiment (2002) "Rex" as The Mother Lovers
- 21st Century Liverpool Underground (2005) "Double Decker Bus", "Swine", "Ladybird", "Broken Man", and "Barrel of Fun".
- The Engine Room presents...vol. III (2006) "Two Feet".
