= Lo Fi Electric Excursions by Mike Badger & Friends =

Lo Fi Electric Excursions

Compilation album by Mike Badger & Friends
- Released: 2006
- Label: Generator

The Onset chronology
The Onset (2005)	Lo Fi Electric Excursions (2006)	Mike Badger's Country Side (2008)

Lo Fi Electric Excursions is the second of two albums released by Mike Badger with a compilation of his various musical incarnations including the La's and The Onset, its sister album being Lo Fi Acoustic Excursions. Lo Fi Electric Excursions was released by the Generator Label in 2006.

== Track listing ==
1. Weeping Willow - The Kachinas (1997) – 3.11
2. Midnight Shift (Practice) - The La's (1985) – 2:00
3. Underworld (alternative mix) - Mike Badger (2000) – 3:10
4. Painting Dub - The La's (1985) – 2:38
5. Time Bomb (live) - The Onset (1989) – 3:17
6. Red Cloud - The Kachinas (1997) – 2:42
7. Shadow Dub - Mike Badger (2000) – 2:32
8. What Say You (practice) - The Onset (1991) – 2:38
9. Take Effect - The Kachinas (1996) – 5:09
10. Space Rocketry (instrumental) - The La's (1986) – 1:57
11. Pick Me Up - - The Kachinas (1996) – 3:25
12. What Do You Do (live) - The La's (1986) – 3:19
13. Let's Go Home - The Onset (1987) – 2:08
14. Hear My Call - The Onset (1993) – 4:30

All words and music by Mike Badger, except
Track 2 Earl Lee, Jimmie Ainsworth;
Track 3 Mike Badger, Bernard Nolan;
Track 4 and 12 Mike Badger, Lee Mavers;
Track 7 Mike Badger, Paul Hemmings;
Track 8 Mike Badger, Paul Hemmings, Danny Dean, Simon Cousins, Tony Russell;
Track 11 and 14 Mike Badger, Danny Dean;

== Musicians ==
Mike Badger - vocals, bottleneck guitar, acoustic guitar, electric guitar, mandolin, percussion
Danny Dean - bottleneck guitar, slide guitar, electric guitar, bass guitar (tracks 1, 5, 6, 8, 9, 11, 13 and 14)
Simon Cousins - bass guitar, backing vocals (tracks 5, 8 and 14)
Paul Hemmings - electric guitar (tracks 5, 7 and 8)
Tony Russell - drums (tracks 5, 8 and 14)
Roger Llewellyn - backing vocals, bass guitar, violin, cello, melodica (tracks 1, 6 and 9)
Bernard Nolan - bass guitar (track 2)
Hamish Cameron - piano (track 13)
Colin Becket - drums (track 13)
Tony Mac - drums (tracks 1, 6 and 9)
Lee Mavers - electric guitar, backing vocals (tracks 2, 4, 10 and 12)
Martyn Campbell - bass guitar (tracks 3, 7 and 11)
Henry Priestman - Hammond organ (tracks 1 and 14)
John Power - bass guitar (tracks 10 and 12)
Chris Sharrock - drums (tracks 3 and 7)
John Timson - drums (tracks 4 and 12)
Jim Fearon - bass guitar (track 4)
Tony Clark - drums (track 2)

== Reviews ==
"It's a sensational set, electrifying music from across the decades and Badger's many modes."

- Jo-Ann Greene (allmusic)

"Being a perfect companion to the previous collection of Lo-Fi Acoustic Excursions, this one features the same line up of Mike Badger-related bands, this time around plugging in for an electrifying set of demos, live takes and even dub versions."

- Goran Obradovic (Popism)

"For those of you who are still unaware of him, Badger is actually a Liverpudlian cult hero of some repute and one whose voice deserves to be heard loud and clear..."

- Tim Peacock (Whisperin and Hollerin)
