= The Bandwagon Club =

2000s club night in Liverpool, UK

Coordinates: 53.402°N 2.980°W

The Bandwagon was a club night held on the first Saturday of every month at The Zanzibar club on Seel Street, Liverpool from 2001 to 2005. The Bandwagon night was run by John Robinson and Gary Murphy, members of the now defunct Liverpool band the Bandits.

"...it wasn't a conscious plan or anything. People point at the name bandwagon and of course it's ironic now, but I never thought about it as a wagon of bands."

—John Robinson, The Bandits.

The Bandwagon was seen as a focal part of the local music scene, dubbed the "cosmic Scouse scene" by the NME, which emerged in Liverpool in the early 2000s. The Coral, the Zutons, the Stands, Tramp Attack and the Hokum Clones were all Bandwagon regulars, who forged their reputations at the night. The Bandwagon also played host to the Libertines and Noel Gallagher.

The Bandwagon drew attention from the media, particularly the NME, and was the subject of a feature on Channel Four's 4music who filmed in the venue on a night when members of the Stands, the Bandits and the Hokum Clones joined on stage to play a cover of Bob Dylan's "Maggie's Farm". The Bandwagon played a guest night at the Knitting Factory in New York in October 2003.

The Bandwagon club night ended as a regular night in 2005 when the Bandits broke up, and has continued only sporadically since then. A similar night called Bandwagonesque, now takes place in The Metropolitan on Berry Street, some 150 yards (140 m) away from the previous venue.

A promotional sticker for the Bandwagon club night is found on an entry in Pete Doherty's journal, Books of Albion in an entry detailing a night out he had with John Robinson and Gary Murphy of the Bandits.
