= The Zanzibar =

Music venue in Liverpool, England

Coordinates: 53°24′08″N 2°58′47″W

The Zanzibar is a live music venue located on Seel Street in Liverpool, England, best known for being the home of regular clubnights such as "The Bandwagon" and "Valhalla", among others. Unlike most clubs in Liverpool, the music is generally rock and alternative.

The venue tends to specialise in unsigned bands, unlike the larger East Village Arts Club (previously known as Liverpool Barfly and later Masque Theatre) located on the opposite side of the road. However, many notable acts have played at The Zanzibar such as Noel Gallagher, The Coral, The Zutons, The Revelation, The Music, The Libertines, Miles Kane, Orjazzmic, Sisteray, Brendan Benson, Edgar Jones, The 1975, The Music, The Soundtrack Of Our Lives, Shack and Tom Vek and is a participating venue in Liverpool Sound City.

The Club itself holds around 300 people, and is divided into two main areas - a long narrow dancefloor which is in front of the stage, and a raised seating area which runs parallel down one side, with the bar flanking the other side of the dancefloor.

There was an upstairs area of the club generally used as a private backstage area for band members, but occasionally it was open to the public, most notably at the Valhalla clubnight run by Wirral-based band "The Laze", where there is a separate stage and PA system set up featuring predominantly acoustic acts or DJs as an alternative to the heavier rock bands that tend to populate the main stage downstairs. The upstairs now incorporates a bar that is open separately to the main club.

Price on the door varies according to what event is on a particular night, but is usually between £3 and £5. The venue also has a cloakroom service.
