= Jegsy Dodd =

English performance poet

Jegsy Dodd (born 1957, Wirral) is an English performance poet from Wirral. He first came to prominence in the 1980s with his backing group, The Sons of Harry Cross. The Sons of Harry Cross were Paul Spencer (drums), Ian Jackson (bass) and Ken Hancock (guitar). His current backing band is called The Original Sinners.

== Biography ==
Dodd recorded a session for John Peel's BBC Radio 1 show in 1985 after sending Peel a demo tape. At Peel's suggestion he formed a band to work with, which he called The Sons of Harry Cross, a reference to the Brookside character. In September 1985 Dodd and the band recorded the self-financed Polluted Minds at the Station House in New Brighton. Cassettes of Polluted Minds were sold at Dodd's stand-up gigs. The cassette featured eight tracks, four with music and four without. Four of these tracks were later re-recorded for the Winebars and Werewolves album, which was a hit on the UK Indie Chart in 1986, reaching number 19. The album was recorded in two days in January 1986 at Naffi Studio in Warrington with Sir Freddie Viadukt. Dodds's first gig with the Sons of Harry Cross was on Thursday 27 February 1986 at London Dingwalls supporting Half Man Half Biscuit. After 11 shows, some of them supporting Half Man Half Biscuit, Paul Spencer and Ian Jackson left the group after the International Garden Festival gig on Sunday 8 June 1986. Ken Hancock carried on with the band until he became the guitarist for Half Man Half Biscuit.

With The Original Sinners, Dodd has released two albums - Wake Up And Smell The Offy (2005) and Loquacious, Loquacious, Loquacious (2008). The track Grumpy Old Men from Wake Up And Smell The Offy reached number one in the 2005 Festive 50 as voted for by listeners to the OneMusic shows of Huw Stephens, Rob da Bank and Ras Kwame.

Dodd is co-author of REDMEN-A Season On The Drink, and Here We Go Gathering Cups in May. Both books are based on his experiences as a fan of Liverpool F.C. He is a survivor of the Hillsborough disaster

== Discography ==
=== Albums ===
- Winebars & Werewolves (1985), Probe Plus
- Wake Up and Smell the Offy (2005), Piffle
- Loquacious, Loquacious, Loquacious (2008), Piffle

=== Compilations ===
- The Probe Plus Stuff (2010), Probe Plus

=== EPs ===
- The Jewel in the Flat Cap (1988), Probe Plus

=== Singles ===
- "Only Football Can Truly Break Your Heart" (2007), Piffle

== Books ==
- Here We Go Gathering Cups In May: Liverpool In Europe, The Fans' Story (2008), Canongate
- Redmen: A Season On The Drink (2009), Matador
- On The Road With The Redmen (2014)
