= Marionette (album) =

Studio album by The Thomas Scott Quintet
- Released: 22 November 2020
- Recorded: 2015–2020
- Studio: Viper Studio, Liverpool
- Genre: Indie rock, chamber pop
- Length: 33:52
- Label: AV8 Records
- Producer: Paul Hemmings & Phil Hartley

Marionette is the debut album by The Thomas Scott Quintet, the solo project of Tommy Scott, frontman of the band Space. The album was released on November 22, 2020, and was made available to stream on December 11 that year.

Marionette differs significantly in sound from Scott's work in Space, showcasing a more organic, lushly-orchestrated style, with Scott calling the tracks "dark acoustic camp fire songs" that follow a "verse, chorus, middle 8" structure, compared with the grooves and samples that dominate his other work.

Scott had been recording solo material on and off for roughly five years at The Viper Studio in Liverpool, with assistance from guitarist and producer Paul Hemmings and Space bass guitarist Phil Hartley. Scott stated that although he had wanted to do a solo record for years, he had been put off with the idea due to various reasons, before Hemmings encouraged him to pursue it: "It was Paul who suggested doing a solo album. I'd been putting it off for years, but he's cool to work with. He's got loads of cool old guitars that gave the album a real vintage vibe… me and Paul are Luddites. We can't use computers and still use old eight-track recorders."

Work on Marionette was completed during the COVID-19 pandemic in the United Kingdom, with Hartley given free rein on the album's orchestral arrangements, incorporating a mixture of violins, accordions and cellos with synthesized orchestration. The album also features contributions from drummer Chris Sharrock and vocals by Kate Milner and Emily Portman.

The physical release of the album was distributed through Peter Wilkinson's AV8 label on limited edition CD, cassette and white vinyl.

== Track listing ==
All songs written by Thomas Scott, with middle 8s written by Paul Hemmings.

No.	Title	Length
1.	"Shadowland"	3:33
2.	"Whilst She Smokes Oblivious (Note: "She Smokes Oblivious" on streaming services)"	2:56
3.	"Crowded World"	2:42
4.	"Marionette"	3:24
5.	"Devilish Kiss"	3:26
6.	"Bizarre Rituals of a Girl Called Nightingale (Note: "Rituals of a Girl Called Nightingale" on streaming services)"	3:39
7.	"End of the World"	3:01
8.	"Ghost of New Orleans"	3:27
9.	"God Me Made Ugly"	3:19
10.	"Treasure Chest"	4:25

Cassette bonus track
No.	Title	Length
11.	"Johnny Thugg"

== Personnel ==
- Thomas Scott – lead vocals, guitar, bass, cover art
- Paul Hemmings – guitar, keyboards, producer, mixing
- Phil Hartley – bass, orchestral arrangements, piano, backing vocals, producer, mixing
- Chris Sharrock – drums

=== Additional personnel ===
- Kate Milner - vocals (tracks 3 & 5)
- Emily Portman - vocals (track 10)
