= Grittleton House School =

Coordinates: 51.5187°N 2.2019°W

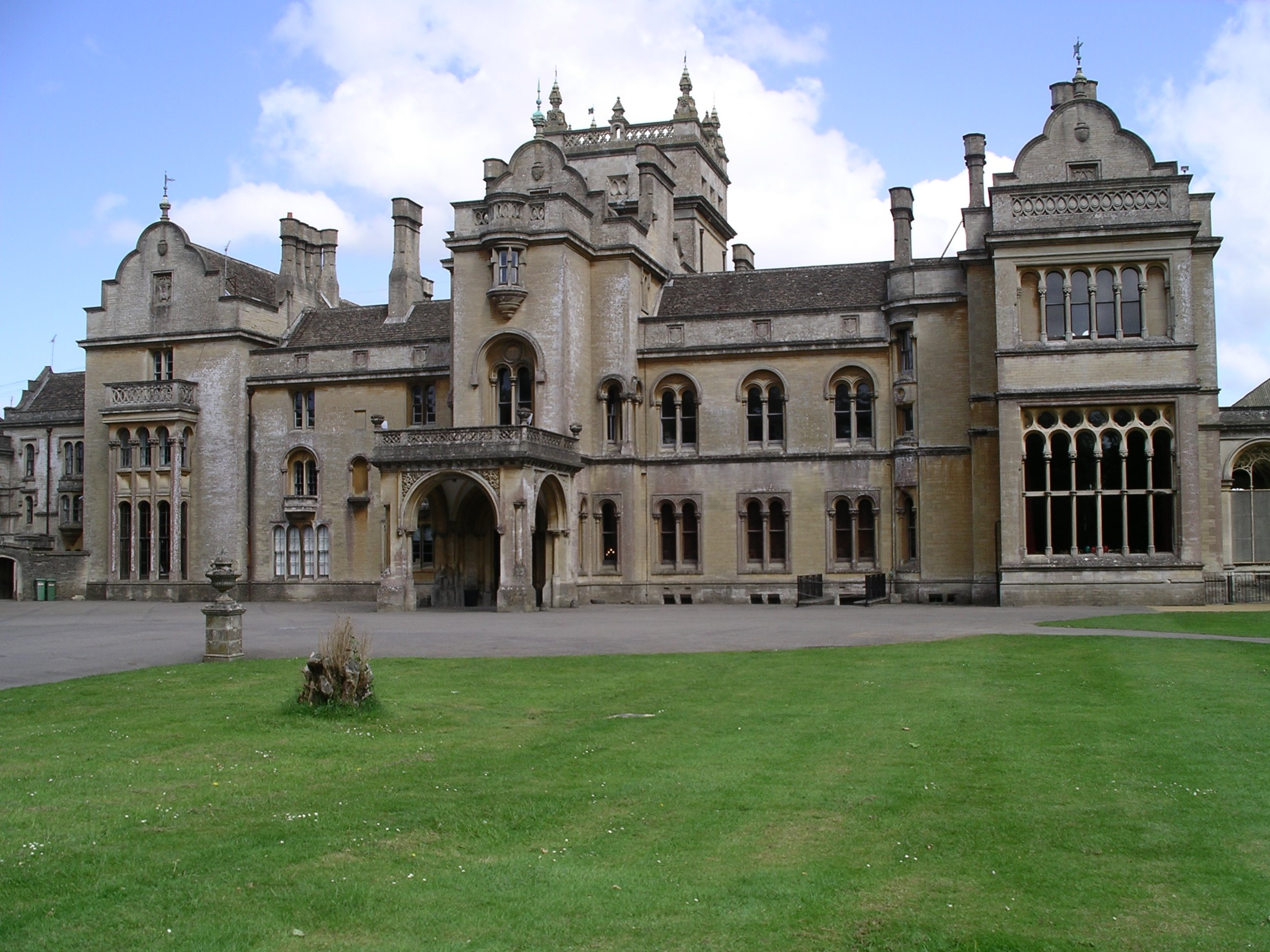
- Grittleton House in 2007
- Grittleton, Wiltshire, SN14 6AP; England

Information
- Type: Independent
- Motto: To strive is to accomplish
- Established: 1951
- Founder: Joanna Shipp
- Closed: 2016
- Local authority: Wiltshire Council
- Department for Education URN: 126514 Tables
- Ofsted: Reports
- Head teacher: Nathan Dawes
- Gender: Coeducational
- Age: 2 to 17
- Enrollment: 177 (in 2015)

Grittleton House School was an independent school in Wiltshire, England, between 1951 and 2016, at Grittleton House.

== History ==
A small, independent school, founded in 1951 by Mrs Joanna Shipp, it was co-educational at both primary and secondary levels and also a children's daycare provider.

The school was non-denominational and non-selective, so that classes were made up of pupils with a wide range of abilities. It offered pupils small classes and claimed to teach traditional family values, courtesy, consideration for others, and responsibility.

In 2008, the average class size was 15, and the school fees for day pupils were between £4,620 and £7,455.

The school closed in July 2016, when it had around 150 children, aged between two and sixteen.

== Notable former pupils ==
- Jamie Cullum (born 1979), jazz-pop singer-songwriter
- Emma Pierson (born 1981), actress
- Angelica Mandy, actress, best known for her role as Gabrielle Delacour in the film Harry Potter and the Goblet of Fire
- Simon Cousins (born 1965), musician
