= Fflaps =

Welsh post-punk band

- Origin: Bangor, Gwynedd, Wales
- Genres: Post-punk
- Years active: 1987–1992
- Labels: Probe Plus, Central Slate
- Past members: Jonny Evans; Alan Holmes; Ann Matthews

Fflaps were a Welsh post-punk band active in the late 1980s and early 1990s, formed in Bangor, Wales. The band comprised vocalist and guitarist Ann Matthews, bassist Alan Holmes and drummer Jonny Evans. Between their formation in 1987 and split in 1992, they released three albums and an EP, recorded two Peel Sessions (in 1988 and 1990), and toured Europe extensively, playing a total of 154 gigs in 7 countries. The band's songs were in the Welsh language.

Matthews and Holmes later formed Ectogram after Evans had to quit to continue his education (he died on 3 March 2001).

== Discography ==
=== Albums ===
- Amhersain (1988), Probe Plus
- Malltod (1990), Probe Plus
- Fflaps (1992), Central Slate

=== EPs ===
- Dilyn Dylan (1987), Anhrefn
