= Ophiuchus (band) =

- Ophiuchus in 1987. Left to Right - Pete Causer, Pat D'Arcy, Myke Vince, Jon Cousins, Xavier Tutein

Background information
- Origin: Castle Combe, England
- Genres: Progressive folk, alternative rock, folk rock
- Years active: 1986–1991; 2010.
- Labels: Ophiuchvs Recordvs; Probe Plus
- Spinoff of: Random Gender
- Members: Jon Cousins; Pat D'Arcy; Simon Cousins; Martin Sawyer; Craig 'Ed' Grimshaw; Simon 'Bud' Millais; Pete Causer; Xavier Tutein; Myke Vince; Glenn Wardle; Mike Slater; Mike Badger; Dave Woodward; Andy Hargreaves; Steve Carvey; Dave Clifford; George Laidlaw; Gary Price; Paul 'Wil' Wilson; Jack 'WestWayy' Cousins

Ophiuchus is a folk/roots rock group from Castle Combe, Wiltshire, England, formed in 1986 by twin brothers - guitarist Jon and bassist Simon Cousins, saxophonist Pat D'Arcy, and photographer/graphic designer Martin Tom Sawyer.

A variety of musicians have performed with the band, including drummer Ed Grimshaw (later of the Warm Jets) and the La's co-founder Mike Badger. The main line-up (1987–1989) was Jon Cousins (lead vocals/guitar/tin whistle) and Pat D'Arcy (saxophones), with Pete Causer (melodeon/flute/bodhrán), Xavier Tutein (bass), and Myke Vince (drums).

The band released the double A-side, "Serpent And The Bearded King"/"Song For Pym" (produced by Climax Blues Band guitarist Pete Haycock) on their own label, Ophiuchvs Recordvs, and an album on Liverpool's Probe Plus label.

Ophiuchus performed their last concert at the Ashton Court Festival in 1991.

In 2010, after a break of nearly 21 years, the original line-up of the band reformed to perform a number of 'Ophiuchus Reunion' concerts - including an appearance at the 40th anniversary of Glastonbury Festival.

== History ==
"Coming from, what I can gather, roots in punk and mummers plays, this seven-piece are something to watch out for. The folk roots are there with accordion and dulcimer weaving an intriguing pattern for a honking sax to blare over ... this rustic rock and harmony is well worth searching for."
Simon Jones (Folk Roots)

=== Formation ===
Wiltshire based progressive folk group Ophiuchus were formed in 1986 by twin brothers Jon and Si Cousins, and Pat D'Arcy. The nucleus of the group developing from the garage/folk rock band Random Gender - originally formed in 1982 by Jon Cousins (guitar), Si Cousins (bass), together with school friends Eddie Deedigan (guitar) and Myke Vince (drums).

Rich Hughes (keyboards) joined Random Gender in 1983, when Deedigan left to go to drama college (later Deedigan formed the band Circus with Tom Aitkenhead and Damon Albarn). In 1984, Pat D'Arcy (saxophone) and lighting and sound engineer Glenn Wardle completed Random Gender's line-up.

From their initial garage sound, Random Gender drew on their rural Wiltshire surroundings, folklore, and the influence of the Stonehenge Free Festival, to develop a distinctive progressive/folk rockstyle. Attracting the attention of ex-Climax Blues Band guitarist Pete Haycock in 1985, who agreed to produce the proposed first single of the band.

Early in 1986 Random Gender disbanded - Jon and Si Cousins and Pat D'Arcy re-forming as Ophiuchus with drummer Ed Grimshaw, and designer/photographer Martin Sawyer (Sawyer providing the group's characteristic graphic/media style). Commenting on the group's unusual name in an early press interview, Jon Cousins stated: "The name Ophiuchus was taken from the ancient thirteenth sign of the zodiac, also known as Serpentarius, which has not been used (astrologically) since the time before Christ. The sign represented the idea of rebirth, and gaining new knowledge. We thought it was appropriate when the band formed, after the split of Random Gender - a band Pat, Si and I were involved with for four years."

By December 1986 both Grimshaw and Si Cousins had departed - Grimshaw to form The Fontaines with Andy West and Louis Jones (both Grimshaw and Louis Jones would later form the Brit-pop indie group Warm Jets). Si Cousins leaving Ophiuchus to join Liverpool band The Onset with La's co-founder Mike Badger. Following Grimshaw's departure the group was briefly joined by jazz drummer Simon 'Bud' Millais.

== Reception ==
"Often whimsical and certainly literate, Ophiuchus created "rural English rock" from rustic isolation and could well have earned the tag "crusty" before The Levellers."
from NME 'Ophiuchus Biography'

=== Ophiuchus (mark 1) ===
Recruiting French bassist Xavier Tutein in February 1987, Jon Cousins and Pat D'Arcy enlisted the ex-Gender drummer Myke Vince and sound engineer Glenn Wardle (now 'front-of-house' on hammered dulcimer and bagpipes) - completing the Ophiuchus line-up with the melodeonist Pete Causer.

In the summer of 1987 Cousins and D'Arcy approached Pete Haycock to produce Ophiuchus's debut double A-side single "The Serpent & the Bearded King" / "Song for Pym". The single was recorded in July and released on 11 September 1987 - on the group's own label Ophiuchvs Records - to enthusiastic reviews: "a belting bit of English pop."

During the winter of 1987/spring 1988 group toured heavily throughout UK, attracting the attention of both national and independent record companies - and a growing reputation for live performances, and 'crusty' image.

The Cruel Driver and Dick

Ophiuchus's own brand of "rural English rock" was heavily influenced by traditional Mumming plays and the Cotswold Morris, mixed together with the garage/folk rock style developed by Random Gender, as Folk Roots magazine illustrated in their description of the group: "In splendid rural isolation, Ophiuchus weave their own dreamy, rustic idyll. A music with diverse inspiration it trades on fat rootsy melodies and naïve lyricism. They’re merry greenwood vagabonds caught between straight ahead folk rock dancing and their own backyard pop." When asked about the group's distinctive style during a press interview with Venue Magazine, Cousins stated: "It just happened. The traditions of this area (Wiltshire) rub off on people. It’s not folk, it’s the rural culture. When I was a kid I remember going down to Castle Combe to see Morris-dancing, or walking into a pub and hearing some old guy singing. It’s what I grew up with."

At concerts, although the group often performed without Glenn Wardle, they were generally accompanied by The Cruel Driver and Dick - two characters from the Lacock Ragged Heroes Mummers - who would introduce the show. The Dick character was a Mari Lwyd horse's head, and would spend most of the group's performance frightening the audience. An Ophiuchus concert would end with the distribution of cow-bells and percussion instruments - "The Bashy Bits" - to the audience, to enable the crowd to play along with the group's closing numbers.

In May 1988, Liverpool's Probe Plus record label re-issued "Serpent And The Bearded King", and agreed to release the group's first LP. Arrangements were made to record a 'live' album at Moles Club in Bath, and to record a studio LP in Bordeaux. The group moved to Bordeaux to begin a month in the recording studio in June 1988 - D'Arcy leaving Ophiuchus to join the folk rock group Red Jasper around this time. The resulting studio recordings from Bordeaux remain unissued.

In September 1988 the now four-piece Ophiuchus - Cousins, Tutein, Causer, Vince - recorded a performance at Moles Club in Bath, with additional percussive contributions from founder-member Simon Cousins and fellow Onset leader Mike Badger. Although the line-up had disbanded during the summer of 1989, an album of this concert, entitled Pronounced Offee-ick Cuss, was released on the Probe Plus label in October of that year, and again reviews were favourable: "Ophiuchus return to give character forming shows like the one preserved here. Sometimes finding your feet is easy, in this case at Mole’s Club in Bath - a liberal sprinkling of hooting supporters, a clutch of numbers easy to clog along to, and a sweaty determination on all sides to have a damn good time. What more could anyone laying down a live scenario ask for?"

=== Ophiuchus (mark 2) ===
With the release of Pronounced Offee-ick Cuss in 1989, original members Jon Cousins and Glenn Wardle formed a new Ophiuchus line-up to promote the album - featuring Dave Woodward (guitar), Andy Hargreaves (bass) and Pagan Fringe drummer Steve Carvey.

Recording at Avebury

Over the winter 1989/90 the group recorded an EP entitled "Lost Tribe Of England" at Ogbourne St. George near Avebury. Early in 1990 Ophiuchus were in negotiations with Probe Plus to release the EP, but Probe were not able to finance the record following the collapse of the UK's national independent record distribution network - the Cartel. Probe Plus’s director Geoff Davis told the NME: "Things have proven tough in recent times. A few months ago, the indie distribution scene fell apart. I was practically broke and it looked as if my house would have to go." Although the "Lost Tribe" EP remains unreleased, a promotional film - including footage of 'The Cruel Driver and Dick' - was recorded by the BBC for one of the EP's tracks: "Big Guns (Are Firing out on the Plain)". This film was included in an interview/feature on Ophiuchus broadcast in January 1990 on the "Points West" magazine programme.

During 1990, Ophiuchus performed a series of high-profile concerts around the UK, including the Edinburgh Fringe, Ashton Court Festival, and support dates on the reformed Half Man Half Biscuit tour.

In August 1990, both Carvey and Wardle left the group. Carvey was briefly replaced by Red Jasper's drummer Dave Clifford (who had previously performed with Cousins during the late 1970s, in the punk band The So!). A permanent replacement for Carvey was found in drummer George Laidlaw and Ophiuchus continued performing as a four-piece until December. The group disbanded following a support concert with Half Man Half Biscuit at Leeds Coliseum on 20 December 1990.

=== Ophiuchus (mark 3) ===
In May 1991, Cousins reformed Ophiuchus to play a series of concerts - including more dates with Half Man Half Biscuit - culminating in a second appearance at the Ashton Court Festival (July 1991). The group's line-up for these concerts was: Cousins (guitar), Laidlaw (drums), ex-Whiskey Priest - Gary Price (cittern), and Paul 'Wil' Wilson (bass). At the Ashton Court concert the group was joined by founder-member saxophonist Pat D'Arcy.

Cousins, Laidlaw, Price, and Wilson (occasionally assisted by D'Arcy) went on to form the roots/rock band Wicca Man.

== Reunion ==
Ophiuchus Reunion 2010, from left to right: Richard Hughes, Simon Cousins, Myke Vince Jon Cousins, Mike Slater (seated), Pete Causer, Glenn Wardle, Pat D'Arcy

Prompted by Ophiuchus Reunion, a fan page on the social networking internet site Facebook, original members: Jon Cousins, Simon Cousins, Pat D'Arcy, Myke Vince, Xavier Tutein, Pete Causer, Glenn Wardle, and Mike Slater reformed Ophiuchus in April 2010.

The group, which also included Jon's son Jack 'WestWayy' Cousins on percussion and ex Random Gender keyboardist Richard Hughes on Piano Accordion, performed a number of concerts including an appearance on the Bandstand Stage at the 40th anniversary of Glastonbury Festival on 27 June 2010. Si Cousins commenting to Merseyside journalist Nick Cook, stated "The band creates a magical sound - playing unusual instruments such as melodeon and hammered dulcimer. Glastonbury, with its legends and mysteries, was the perfect place for us to play.".

== Discography ==
- "The Serpent & the Bearded King" / "Song for Pym" Single (1987), Ophiuchvs Recordvs OPH001
- Pronounced Offee-ick Cuss LP (1989), Probe Plus PROBE23
