= Henry Priestman =

- Henry Priestman in Llanymynech, UK Photo by Andrew D. Hurley.

Background information
- Also known as: Henry Amber; Amber; Amber and Black; Amber & Black
- Born: Henry Christian Priestman; 21 June 1955 (age 71); Kingston upon Hull, England
- Genres: Pop, folk, soft rock
- Occupations: Singer, keyboardist, record producer, songwriter
- Instruments: Vocals, keyboards, guitar
- Years active: 1975–present
- Label: Stiff Records
- Member of: Yachts; The Christians; Amber & Black
- Website: https://www.henrypriestman.com

Henry Christian Priestman (born 21 June 1955) is an English rock singer, keyboardist, record producer and songwriter.

== Biography ==
Priestman was born in Kingston upon Hull, East Riding of Yorkshire, England, and educated at Woodleigh School, North Yorkshire and later the Quaker School, Leighton Park School in Reading and then went on to study Art at the Liverpool College of Art. In the late 1970s he played with the British power pop band, Yachts. Yachts supported The Who on their 1979 European tour. In 1980, Priestman was one of the co-founders of It's Immaterial. Although he had officially left the band by 1986, he played as a session musician on the hit single, "Driving Away From Home", and appeared with the band on Top of the Pops.

During the 1980s and 1990s he was a member of The Christians. Priestman has also been used as a session musician by both Bette Bright and Mike Badger. Priestman played keyboards on Badger's albums, Lo Fi Acoustic Excursions by Mike Badger & Friends (2004), The Onset (2005), and Lo Fi Electric Excursions by Mike Badger & Friends (2006).

Priestman was a schoolfriend of filmmaker Mark Herman, who like Priestman is a Hull City A.F.C. fan.

In February 1983 Priestman as Harry Amber and Herman as Mark Black, together as Amber and Black, along with the Hull City players themselves, released the song "The Tigers are Back". It was made to raise funds to help pay the players wages, as the effects of Hull City's previous seasons money struggles were still visible. Herman reworded the song "Out of Luck" by Priestman's previous band Yachts, to get the lyrics. The record sleeves and records themselves contained the made up record label logo Don Records in tribute to Hull City's then chairman Don Robinson, and the made up issue number COL001 in tribute to their then manager Colin Appleton.

In June 1983, Mark Herman filmed Hull City's end-of-season tour of Florida, where the players and staff visited Walt Disney World, and played the Tampa Bay Rowdies who were managed by Rodney Marsh, in the return leg of the Arrow Air Anglo-American Cup. It was directed and edited by Herman, with Priestman composing the music. Herman released the documentary online in 2016 with the title A Kick in the Grass.

Herman co-wrote lyrics for the songs "Ideal World", "Hooverville" and "Sad Songs" for Priestman's band The Christians on their first album, The Christians (1987), alongside Priestman. Priestman wrote a football themed song for Herman's film See You At Wembley, Frankie Walsh (1986), and Herman wrote the lyrics for it, however the lyrics did not fit the song, so they were initially scrapped. However they tweaked the lyrics, which were eventually used for "Ideal World" instead.

On the 1 January 2008, midway through Hull City's Premier League promotion season, Amber & Black, released the song "The City's on Fire" on Myspace. It was their first Hull City song since 1983. It was later re-released just before 2014 FA Cup final between Hull City and Arsenal F.C.

Priestman was the producer of Mark Owen's 2003 Top 5 album, In Your Own Time. On 22 September 2008, Priestman released his debut solo album, The Chronicles of Modern Life, on Stiff Records. Artwork was made by Tobbe Stuhre. The album was a success, and Island Records bought the entire project for a major re-release. When Island Records picked up the album from Stiff, Priestman became the oldest artist to be signed to a major label for a debut solo album. He also wrote music for a digital age, including a James Bond Xbox game, BBC TV's Wildlife on One and Natural World. He has also written the music for numerous commercials.

He supported Fisherman's Friends in 2011, and played a slot at the Beverley Folk Festival in 2013. He continues to enjoy live work, and released his second album, The Last Mad Surge of Youth on 17 February 2014.

Priestman also composed the title song for the West End musical Dreamboats and Petticoats, and he wrote three songs for Graham Gouldman's 2012 album, Love and Work.

In 2015, he released his first solo live DVD entitled Settle Down, recorded live at Victoria Hall in Settle, Yorkshire.

== Solo discography ==
=== The Chronicles of Modern Life ===
Album track listing:

1. "Don't You Love Me No More"
2. "Old"
3. "What You Doin' with Me?"
4. "It's Called a Heart"
5. "Grey's the New Blonde"
6. "He Ain't Good Enough for You"
7. "The Idiot"
8. "The Sacred Scrolls of Pop"
9. "No to the Logo"
10. "Did I Fight in the Punk Wars for This?"
11. "It's What You Leave Behind"
12. "Goodbye Mr. Lee (...And Thanks)"
13. Hidden track: "Suffice to Say"

=== The Last Mad Surge of Youth ===
Album track listing:

1. "At the End of the Day"
2. "True Believer"
3. "We Used to Be You"
4. "Goodbye Common Sense"
5. "Valentine Song"
6. "In My Head"
7. "The Last Mad Surge of Youth"
8. "Rant 'N' Rave"
9. "Huntin' and Gatherin' (Ain't What It Used to Be)"
10. "Same Circus, Different Clowns"
11. "I Cried Today"
12. "A Pint of Bitter and Twisted, Please"
13. "We Used to Be You (Part 2)"
