= The Stairs =

English rock band

- Origin: Liverpool, England
- Genres: Indie rock, alternative rock, garage rock, blues rock
- Years active: 1990–1994, 2015–present
- Labels: Imaginary, Go! Discs, Viper
- Members: Edgar "Summertyme" Jones; Ged Lynn; Paul Maguire
- Past members: Carl Cook; Daniel Kierney
- Website: twitter.com/thestairsuk

The Stairs are an English rock band, formed in Liverpool in 1990 by vocalist and bassist Edgar "Summertyme" Jones, guitarist Ged Lynn and drummer Paul Maguire.

The band released one album and a handful of singles, prior to Lynn's departure in 1993 and their eventual split the following year.

The Stairs reformed in 2015, playing a one-off gig at The Kazimier in Liverpool before announcing a 2016 UK tour and headline appearance at the Le Beat Bespoké festival in London.

== History ==
Following a stint as bassist with Echo & The Bunnymen frontman Ian McCulloch, Edgar Jones set about forming a Nuggets/Pebbles style band, influenced by the likes of The 13th Floor Elevators, The Seeds, The Chocolate Watch Band as well as The Beatles and The Rolling Stones. Initially set to release their debut EP Weed Bus on local independent label Imaginary Records (for which a handful of white labels with unique picture sleeves were pressed up), the band ended up signing to Go! Discs, home to The La's and Paul Weller with whom they would issue the album Mexican R'n'B (1992) along with three EPs, all recorded in mono as a nod to their garage rock influences. (The song "Weed Bus," and the album's title, are overt references to The Who.) The band's manager, Jason Otty, although not a proper member of the group, would often play harmonica and appear in press shots.

The band would also release an EP featuring the Del-Vetts song "Last Time Around" and provide a cover version of the Captain Beefheart version of the David Gates penned "Moonchild" for a compilation for Imaginary Records to make up for not releasing the Weed Bus EP with them. They had also intended to record a full album of garage rock covers for the label, but their contract with Go! Discs prevented this.

Following numerous aborted studio sessions for a second album after their departure from Go! Discs in late 1992, including stints at Toe Rag Studios, changes in personnel (including second guitarists Carl Cook and Danny Kierney), the departure of Ged Lynn and moving away from mono production and into blues rock and psychedelia, the band split in 1994.

In 2006, a collection of demos, Right in the Back of Your Mind, was released via The Viper Label and included early versions of previously released material along with several demos for the aborted second album. In 2008, the second Stairs album, Who Is This Is, was finally released by Viper. Although marketed as the second album, it is believed there was another album recorded prior to this with the working title of "Our Life Behind The Golden Cabbage" (the cover art for Who Is This Is referenced this title).

On 17 July 2015, it was announced the band had reformed and would headline "The Butterfly’s Ball & The Grasshoppers Feast" at The Kazimier, Liverpool on 26 November 2015. The band debuted a new song, "1000 Miles", based on a jam they would often perform in soundcheck. It was confirmed in early 2016 the band would tour the UK in June of that year.

== Post Stairs ==
Since the breakup of The Stairs in the mid-1990s, Edgar Jones has worked with Paul Weller, Johnny Marr (in an early version of The Healers), St Etienne, Candie Payne, Cherry Ghost and The La's. He also formed The Isrites and The Big Kids in the 90s who featured two future members of The Zutons and Howie Payne of The Stands as well as releasing 3 solo albums before forming Free Peace in 2008.

Ged Lynn formed The Living Brain, starting as an acoustic duo with Lars Gabel pre-1997, and later adding Tom Sumnall, James Pagella, and Matt Lord. The band folded in late 2000, the remnants of which, minus Lynn, became Zukanican. They contributed two tracks to Get Serious '97, a collection of material from Merseyside artists. The Living Brain also released two albums: Life Sentence On Planet Earth (Medical Records 1999), and Bad Present Day (Medical Records 2000). Ged was also a member of Kung Fu with ex-everybody Barry Sutton (who impersonated Ged for a month in '91) and ex Room and future Zukanican Phil Lucking between 1996 and 1999. Lynn then formed Rhombus of Doom with Lee Webster in 2000 and later The Privileged Few.

Paul Maguire formed Gloss with Icelandic singer Heidrun Anna Bjornsdottir, who were signed to Nude Records and were active between 2001 and 2002 before the band's label went into voluntary liquidation. He has also done session work with former Cast frontman John Power and Candie Payne before relocating to Iceland, where he is now a member of Ske.

== Members ==
- Edgar "Summertyme" William Jones – bass, lead vocals, guitar, keyboards (1990–1994)
- Gerald "Ged" Michael Lynn – guitar, backing vocals (1990–c. 1993)
- Paul Maguire – drums (1990–1994)
- Carl Cook – guitar (c. 1993/1994)
- Daniel Kierney – guitar (c. 1993/1994)

== Discography ==
=== Albums ===
- Mexican R'n'B (Go! Discs 1992)

=== Singles and EPs ===
- Weed Bus (Go! Discs EP, 1991)
- Woman Gone and Say Goodbye (Go! Discs EP, 1992)
- Mary Joanna (Go! Discs EP, 1992)
- Last Time Around (Imaginary EP, 1992)
- Flying Machine (1992)
- S**t Town (Eighties Vinyl Records, 2015)

=== Compilations ===
- Right in the Back of Your Mind (Viper 2006)
- Who Is This Is (Viper 2008)
- The Great Lemonade Machine In The Sky (Viper 2015)

=== Compilation appearances ===
- 1965 - Through the Looking Glass (1992) – "Moonchild"
