= Revolutionary Army of the Infant Jesus =

English experimental music collective

Revolutionary Army of the Infant Jesus is an experimental music collective that was formed in Liverpool, England in 1985 by Dave Seddon, Jon Egan, Sue McBride, and Paul Boyce, who were soon joined by Leslie Hampson. Their name is a reference to the terrorist group in Luis Buñuel's final film, That Obscure Object of Desire.

The group's music is a blend of folk and sacred music, industrial and ambient sounds, and samples that has drawn comparisons to neofolk artists like Current 93 and Death in June, as well as artists including Dead Can Dance, Godspeed You! Black Emperor, Henryk Górecki, and Arvo Pärt. The group incorporates Christian imagery and symbolism into their music, and specifically draws inspiration from the Eastern Church, especially its use of icons. In concert, the group incorporates multimedia and film clips from directors like Andrei Tarkovsky into their performances, as well as ritual movements and field recordings.

The group's first two albums -- The Gift of Tears (1987) and Mirror (1990) -- were released on the Probe Plus label, as were two EPs, La Liturgie Pour La Fin Du Temps (1994) and Paradis (1995). After a long hiatus, the group was approached by the French label Infrastition to re-release their back catalogue in a collection titled After the End (2013). This prompted the band to return for a new album titled Beauty Will Save the World (2015) on Occultation Recordings. Jess Main joined the collective to sing most of the vocals. Seddon was involved in the first recording session of the new album, but left the collection after that. The Gift of Tears and Mirror have also been reissued, in 2015 and 2017, respectively.

A new album, Songs of Yearning was released on Occultation Recordings in June 2020, along with a second, limited edition, album titled Nocturnes. The first RAIJ single, I Carry the Sun/Falling (full-length), was released on 13 March 2020, again on Occultation.

== Discography ==
=== Studio albums ===
- The Gift of Tears (1987, Probe Plus)
- Mirror (1991, Probe Plus)
- Beauty Will Save The World (2015, Occultation Recordings)
- Songs of Yearning (2020, Occultation Recordings)
- Nocturnes (2020, Occultation Recordings)
- The Dream We Carry (2024, 9x9 Records)

=== EPs ===
- La Liturgie Pour La Fin Du Temps (1994, Probe Plus)
- Paradis (1995, Apocalyptic Vision)

=== Singles ===
- I Carry the Sun/Falling (full-length) (2020, Occultation Recordings)

=== Compilations ===
- The Gift of Tears / Mirror / La Liturgie Pour La Fin Du Temps (1994, Apocalyptic Vision)
- After The End (2013, Infrastition)
