= Woman Gone and Say Goodbye =

Woman Gone And Say Goodbye

EP by The Stairs
- Released: 24 February 1992
- Genre: Rock
- Label: Go! Discs
- Producer: Peg Majoly/The Stairs

The Stairs chronology
| Weed Bus (1991) | Woman Gone And Say Goodbye (1992) | Mary Joanna (1992) |

Woman Gone And Say Goodbye was the second EP released by Liverpool band The Stairs, the first being Weed Bus. The EP was issued in several formats: CD EP; 7-inch vinyl single with picture sleeve; 12-inch vinyl 45 rpm single with picture sleeve; 12-inch 45 rpm vinyl DJ promo single with a plain black sleeve. Both 12-inch vinyl single formats have What do you mean you don't smoke? inscribed in the matrix on Side A.

== Songs ==
You Don't Love Me (You Don't Care) is a cover of a Bo Diddley song originally released in July 1959 on Checker Records album Go Bo Diddley. Russian Spy And I is also a cover, originally recorded by Dutch band The Hunters and released in 1966. The guitarist from The Hunters, Jan Akkerman, went on to form Brainbox in 1969 and, later, joined Focus.

UK 7-inch - Go!Disc 7" - GOD 70

Side A

1. Woman Gone And Say Goodbye
2. You Don't Love Me (You Don't Care)

Side B

1. Russian Spy And I
2. Yes It Is It's True

UK 12-inch - Go!Disc 12" - GODX 70

Side A

1. Woman Gone And Say Goodbye
2. You Don't Love Me (You Don't Care)

Side B

1. Russian Spy And I
2. Yes It Is It's True

UK CD - Go!Disc CDS - GODCD 70

1. Woman Gone And Say Goodbye
2. You Don't Love Me (You Don't Care)
3. Russian Spy And I
4. Yes It Is It's True
