= Weed Bus =

EP by The Stairs
- Released: 11 November 1991
- Genre: Rock
- Label: Go! Discs
- Producer: Peg Majoly/The Stairs

The Stairs chronology
Weed Bus (1991)	Woman Gone and Say Goodbye (1992)

Weed Bus was the first ep released by Liverpool band The Stairs. The ep was issued in several formats: CD EP; 7-inch vinyl single; 12-inch vinyl 45 rpm single with picture sleeve; 12-inch 45 rpm vinyl DJ promo single with a plain black sleeve. The matrix of Side A on the 7-inch vinyl single has Mexican R'N'B inscribed on it, while Side B has Goodbye Sister Disco inscribed. Both 12-inch vinyl single formats have Don't mess with the Tank inscribed in the matrix on Side A, and Dave Quicksilver and The Blues Messengers inscribed on Side B. The cover art photograph was taken by David Maguire, brother to band member Paul Maguire.

UK 7-inch – Go!Disc 7-inch – GOD 63

Side A

1. Weed Bus
2. Take No Notice Of The World Outside

Side B

1. Flying Machine
2. When It All Goes Wrong

UK 12-inch – Go!Disc 12-inch – GODX 63

Side A

1. Weed Bus
2. Take No Notice Of The World Outside

Side B

1. Flying Machine
2. When It All Goes Wrong

UK CD – Go!Disc CDS – GODCD 63

1. Weed Bus
2. Take No Notice Of The World Outside
3. Flying Machine
4. When It All Goes Wrong
