= Mary Joanna =

EP by The Stairs
- Released: 1992
- Genre: Rock
- Label: Go! Discs
- Producer: Peg Majoly/The Stairs

The Stairs chronology
Woman Gone and Say Goodbye (1992)	Mary Joanna (1992)	Last Time Around (1992)

Mary Joanna is an ep released in 1992 by The Stairs. As with other Stairs releases, it was issued in several formats: CD single, 7" vinyl, and 12" vinyl. The 7" vinyl release came with Stairtex Record Cleaner enclosed, supposedly a cd cleaner on one side, and a vinyl record cleaner on the other. The cleaner was actually a piece of sandpaper, the coarse side of which was supposed to be used to 'clean' cds.

== Songs ==
I Can Only Give You Everything is a song originally performed by Them on their Them Again album and released in 1966. It was written by Phil Coulter (who also wrote the winning song from the 1967 Eurovision Song Contest, Puppet on a String performed by Sandie Shaw) and Tommy Scott, musician and producer.

Squashed Tomato Stomp is actually a cover of the Bo Diddley 1961 instrumental track Bo's Bounce.

UK 7" - Go!Disc 7" - GOD 79

Side A

1. Mary Joanna

Side B

1. I Can Only Give You Everything
2. Squashed Tomato Stomp

UK 12" - Go!Disc 12" - GODX 79

Side A

1. Mary Joanna
2. Mad Song

Side B

1. I Can Only Give You Everything
2. Squashed Tomato Stomp

UK CD - Go!Disc CDS - GODCD 79

1. Mary Joanna
2. Mad Song
3. I Can Only Give You Everything
4. Squashed Tomato Stomp
