= Probe Plus =

Record label in England

- Parent company: Probe Records
- Founded: May 1981; 44 years ago
- Founder: Geoff Davies
- Defunct: 2021
- Country of origin: United Kingdom
- Location: Liverpool, England

Probe Plus was a record label based in Liverpool, England. It was founded by Geoff Davies, an enthusiastic promoter of small, unsigned bands, who described the label as "Music to drive you to drink".

== History ==
The label was started in May 1981, its first release being the self-titled debut EP by local electronic band Ex Post Facto. For years the label was based in an office above the Probe Records shop in Rainford Gardens. Due to a change in building ownership both the shop and label were forced to move and Davies set up office in his house. After marrying Anne in 1999, they moved house and he continued to run the label from there.

Probe Plus has a number of bands to their name including Kelso, Dead Poppies and Marlowe. In 1990, the label released "Colours", the first single by No-Man, who later signed to One Little Indian and Epic/Sony.

The label is perhaps best known for Half Man Half Biscuit, who were signed from 1985 until the end of the label. Davies signed the group on the basis of a tape they gave to him, saying "I thought that if the tape was half as good as the titles then I'd want to record this group". The band's debut album sold over 50,000 copies, enabling Davies to plough money back into the label.

Probe Plus were later home to a number of Welsh bands, including Fflaps who released a Welsh-language album on the label.

Many of the label's releases were produced by Davies and Sam Davis under the pseudonym 'The Bald Brothers'.

In 2021, Davies announced his retirement and the closure of the label with Half Man Half Biscuit announcing they will move to self-releasing their future material.

Davies died aged 80 on 12 September 2023.

== Probe Plus artists ==
Probe Plus have released records by artists including:

- Attila the Stockbroker
- Betrayal
- Brenda and the Beachballs
- Cyclic Amp
- Dead Poppies
- Dog Flambé
- The Doonicans
- Ex Post Facto
- The Farm
- Fflaps
- Gone to Earth
- Half Man Half Biscuit
- jd meatyard
- Jegsy Dodd
- Levellers 5
- Lovecraft
- The Magic Carpets
- Mel-O-Tones
- No-Man
- The Onset - featured Mike Badger and Paul Hemmings formerly of The La's
- Ophiuchus
- Poisoned Electrick Head
- Pressure Drop
- Public Disgrace
- Revolutionary Army of the Infant Jesus
- Sik Lizards
- St. Vitus Dance
- Surreal Estate (who included Will Sergeant and Les Pattinson of Echo & the Bunnymen)
- The Tansads
- The Tractors
- The Tunnel Frenzies
- The Walking Seeds

== See also ==
- List of record labels
