= The Onset =

English indie rock band

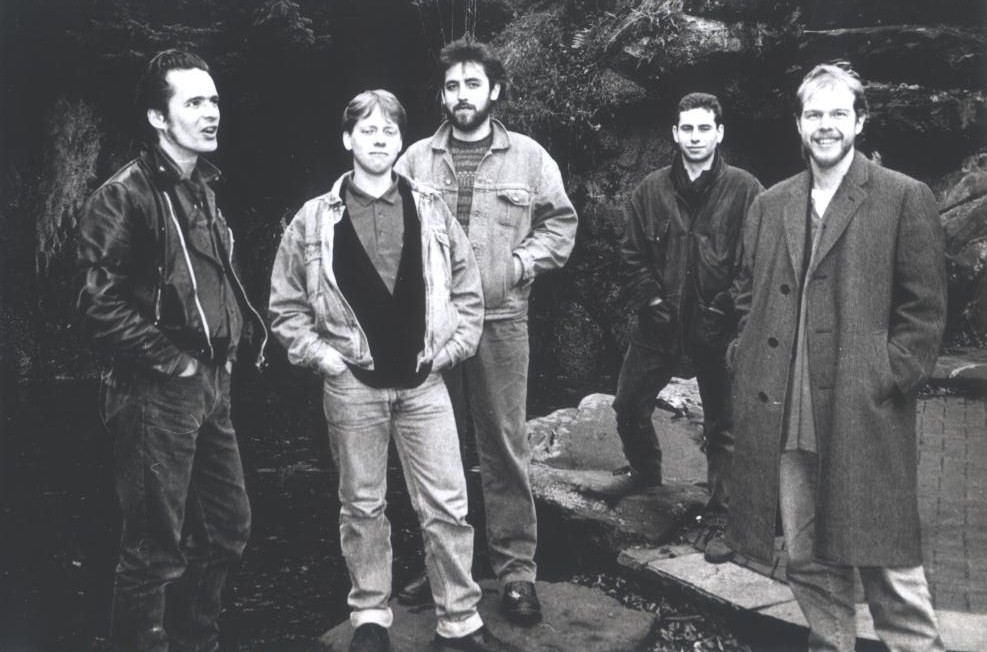
- The Onset in 1990. Left to Right - Mike Badger, Tony Russell, Danny Dean, Paul Hemmings, Simon Cousins

Background information
- Origin: Liverpool, England
- Genres: Indie rock
- Years active: 1987–1995
- Labels: Probe Plus, Furious Fish, The Viper Label, Generator
- Spinoff of: The La's
- Members: Mike Badger, 1987-1995; Hamish Cameron, 1987; Colin Becket, 1987; Danny Dean, 1987-1995; Simon Cousins, 1987-1991, 1994-1995; Rye, 1987; Sue Dring, 1987; Bernard Nolan, 1987, 1992-1994; Roger Llewellyn, 1987, 1993-1995; Nick Hrydowy, 1987; Tony Russell, 1987-1995; Paul Hemmings, 1987-1991; Brian Morrow, 1993-1994
- Website: Mike Badger's Onset Page

The Onset were an indie rock band formed in 1987 by Mike Badger after he left his former band the La's. Badger teamed up with locals Danny Dean on guitar, Hamish Cameron on piano and Colin Becket on drums. The first demo "Let's Go Home" can be found on the 2006 compilation CD, Lo Fi Electric Excursions by Mike Badger & Friends.

== History ==
New Merseybeat Rock Family Tree featuring The Onset

Their sound was heavily influenced by American bluegrass and country music merged with a dose of punky rock 'n' roll. On hearing the demo Geoff Davies of Liverpool's independent record label Probe Plus Records arranged for the band to record their first LP The Pool Of Life (Probe 19).

The Pool Of Life was recorded at Ameritz Studios in Birkenhead during May 1988. Ten musicians contributed to the LP, but by the time of its release, the Onset's lineup had stabilised to just five. Mike and Danny being joined by Simon Cousins (from Wiltshire Folk Rock band Ophiuchus) on bass, Tony Russell on drums, and Paul Hemmings (from the La's) on guitar, slide and mandolin. The LP was greeted with rave reviews by the Music Press but failed to make any impression, with little radio or TV air play. The band made promotional videos for two tracks from the album, "Too Proud To Start" and "Precious Love".

Recording Sessions followed in 1989 at various Liverpool Studios, however no further releases until 1990 when the Onset recorded in London with Dave Dix (of Black's "Wonderful Life" fame) as their producer. With Dave Dix they recorded three songs, "What Say You", "First I Feel You" and "Two Step Angels". These were released in 1990 as the What Say You EP (Onset 1) on the Furious Fish label. To promote the EP the Onset filmed a video for "First I Feel You", playing at Liverpool's Pier Head in the old Atlantic Liner Terminal.

Cartoon portrait of the Onset by Roger Llewellyn used for the inner sleeve of "The Pool Of Life LP", 1988, showing the 10 musicians featured on the LP Left to Right - Mike Badger, Tony Russell, Paul Hemmings, Danny Dean, Simon Cousins, Hamish Cameron (front), Nick Hyrdowy, Bernard Nolan, Roger Llewellyn (front) and Sue Dring

The musical styles on the What Say You EP had developed from the Country and Bluegrass sounds of The Pool Of Life. There was still a Country influence, but they had become more electric incorporating elements of Folk Rock and Pop, which gave them a rather distinctive sound. John Hodgkinson of Shout Magazine stated that "The title track (What Say You) is literate Rockabilly with synchronistic lyrical pointers to Mandella and Hendrix, 'First I Feel You' is a glorious slice of chiming, jangling pop, that storms the brain and lays siege to the memory cells."

The Onset recorded three more tracks in 1991 at Liverpool's Pink Studios in the hope of producing a further EP. However, the record never materialised. There were changes to the band's line up at the end of 1991, which saw Paul Hemmings leave to join Ian Broudie and the Lightning Seeds and Si Cousins depart to play with Brian Morrow and former Onset musicians Roger Llewellyn and Nick Hrydowy, as the Catfish.

Bernard Nolan rejoined the Onset on Bass Guitar and Double Bass and the band continued as a four piece. With Bernie's arrival the essence of the Onset's music became more acoustic, returning to its Rockabilly / Bluegrass roots. This acoustic roots feel was enhanced in 1993 when the band were joined by two ex-Catfish - Brian Morrow on percussion and the multi-talented Roger Llewellyn on guitar, vocal, banjo, fiddle and harmonica. In October 1993 the band recorded sessions for a new Probe Plus release. This was followed in by a further session in February 1994. The seven songs from these sessions were added to nine from the original The Pool Of Life LP and released as The Pool Of Life Revisited CD (Probe 40) in 1994.

The Onset in 1995 photography by Brian Morrow. Left to Right back row - Dan Dean. Roger Llewellyn, Si Cousins. Left to Right front row - Tony Russell and Mike Badger

1994 saw the departure of Bernard Nolan and Brian Morrow and the return of Simon Cousins on bass. The band recorded in late 1994 and early 1995 at Ian Broudie's Studio, with ex-Onseter Paul Hemmings as the Producer. These later recordings captured both the Country Bluegrass elements of the band's sound and the Indie / Pop feel. Piano, banjo, organ, fiddle and harmonica give a varied pallet of colour and texture. Many of the songs remain unreleased, but a few were included on the 2005 CD eponymously entitled The Onset (Gen10), released by Mike Badger on his Generator Label. The Onset CD contains a selection of the band's music from all it various incarnations, covering the period from 1989 to 1994.

More Onset tracks were released in 2008 as part of Mike Badger's Country Side CD, which covers a twenty-year period of his career from 1988 to 2008.

The Onsets final recording session was an acoustic session on Spencer Leigh's show On The Beat, for BBC Radio Merseyside in 1995. The band were broadcast playing an unplugged version of the song "Walking Tall". This recording appears on compilation CD Lo Fi Acoustic Excursions by Mike Badger & Friends (Gen9) released on the Generator Label in 2003.

== Discography ==
- The Pool Of Life LP (1988), Probe Plus Records
- What Say You EP (1990), Furious Fish Records
- The Pool Of Life Revisited CD album (1994), Probe Plus Records
- The Onset (album) CD album (2005), The Generator Label

== Live shows ==
The Onset in 1989, photography by Brian Morrow. Left to Right: Hemmings, Cousins, Russell, Badger and Dean

The Onset toured constantly, playing many of the UK's universities and colleges as well as clubs, pubs and art centres. They played the Edinburgh Festival Fringe in 1989, were regular visitors in Europe and made it to Glastonbury Festival in 1992.

Four films of the Onset playing live exist - Rainhill Youth Club St. Helens in 1988, the Earthbeat Festival at Liverpool's Sefton Park in 1989, London's New Pegasus in 1990 and The Celebration Festival at the Albert Dock Liverpool in 1991.

Reminiscences of the Onset can be read online in Tim Peacock's Interview with Mike Badger for Whisperin and Hollerin Magazine in January 2008.
