= The Viper Label =

British indie record label

- Founded: 1999
- Founder: Mike Badger; Paul Hemmings
- Genre: Alternative rock, indie rock, psychedelic rock
- Country of origin: United Kingdom
- Location: Liverpool, England
- Official website: the-viper-label.co.uk

The Viper Label is an independent record label from Liverpool, England and was founded in 1999 by musicians Mike Badger and Paul Hemmings both former members of The La's and The Onset. Hemmings also played with Ian Broudie in The Lightning Seeds. Both are most famous for writing the theme music to BBC One's daytime television programme, Doctors, and were nominated for a BAFTA.

== History ==
The label has issued archive releases of The La's, The Stairs (including the band's second album), Captain Beefheart, numerous compilation albums, and albums by Stairs frontman Edgar Jones, and former Cast bassist, Peter Wilkinson.

== Discography ==
Studio albums

- Mike Badger - Volume (1999)
- Mike Badger - Double Zero (2000)
- Dead Cowboys - Comings and Goings (2000)
- Steve Roberts - It Just Is (2001)
- Aviator - Huxley Pig Part 1 (2002)
- Otaku No Denki - The Future Played Backwards (2003)
- Garry Christian - How Does It Feel... (2004)
- The Floatation Project - Sonic Stories (2005)
- Edgar Jones - Soothing Music for Stray Cats (2005)
- Tramp Attack - Call in Sick (2006)
- The Floatation Project - Sounds from the Solar System (2006)
- Chris Elliot - Fierce Truth and Fortune (2007)
- Edgar Jones - Gettin' a Little Help from The Joneses (2007)
- Edgar Jones - The Masked Marauder (2008)
- The Stairs - Who Is This Is (2008)
- The Floatation Project - Made out of Worldly Shapes (2011)
- The Floatation Project - Late Night Blue (2011)
- Free Peace - Stormy Weather (2011)
- Mike Badger - Rogue State (2011)

Compilation and live albums

- The La's - Lost La's 1984–1986: Breakloose (1999)
- Arthur Lee & Shack - Live in Liverpool (2000)
- The La's - Lost La's 1986–1987: Callin' All (2001)
- Captain Beefheart - Magnetic Hands: Live in the UK 72–80 (2002)
- Captain Beefheart - Railroadism: Live in the USA 72–81 (2003)
- Captain Beefheart - Magneticism (2004)
- The Stairs - Right in the Back of Your Mind (2006)
- Arthur Lee - Forever Changes Tour Liverpool 2003 (2008)
- Edgar Jones & The Joneses - Live: We Should Get Together (2008)
- The La's - De Freitas Session '87 (2010)
- Jimmy Campbell - Live 1977 (2011)

Singles

- The Benjamins - "Out on the Water" (2002)
- The Great Northwestern Hoboes - "Between Catharine & Hope" (2004)
- The Great Northwestern Hoboes - "Change Your Tune" (2004)
- Edgar Jones & The Joneses - "More than You've Ever Had" (2006)
- Edgar Jones & The Joneses - "The Way It Is" (2007)
- Edgar Jones & The Joneses - "Mellow Down Pussycat" (2007)

== See also ==
- The La's
- The Onset
