= Mike Badger =

Musician

- Badger at Lost and Found Exhibition at the Liverpool Art School in 1997

Background information
- Born: Michael Clifford Badger; 18 March 1962 (age 64); Liverpool, England
- Genres: Alternative rock, indie rock, country, rockabilly
- Occupations: Singer-songwriter, guitarist, artist, sculptor
- Instruments: Guitar, vocals
- Years active: 1983–present
- Labels: Viper, Generator
- Member of: Mike Badger and The Shady Trio
- Formerly of: The La's; The Onset; The Kachinas
- Website: www.mikebadger.co.uk

Michael Clifford Badger (born 18 March 1962) is an English singer-songwriter, artist and sculptor from Liverpool, England. Co-founder of The La's he went on to form alternative country/roots rockabilly band The Onset in 1988 and Mike Badger and The Shady Trio in 2010. In addition he is co-owner of Liverpool's independent Viper Label with Paul Hemmings.

== Career ==
In 1997 Badger's first one-man exhibition of recycled art titled Lost and Found was displayed in Warrington Museum, later shown in Bristol Museum 1998, and Leicester City Gallery in 1999. Also, in 1997 Badger created several tin sculptures for Liverpool band Space's album Tin Planet, and for their video of "Avenging Angels".

He has released solo badger albums including Volume in 1999 and Double Zero in 2000, and has recently curated a collection of his previously unreleased material with albums such as Lost La's, Lo-Fi Acoustic Excursions, Lo-Fi Electric Excursions, and Mike Badger's Country Side. In 2006, Badger's sculpture was selected by The Prince's Foundation for Children and The Arts for a UK primary school education package. Later that year, he commenced work as Artist in Residence at ITV Granada (celebrating 50 years of broadcasting).

Badger appeared at the SXSW music festival in Austin, Texas, in 2009 and again in 2010, where he performed with local and international acts and featured on Country Music Radio USA. In 2010 he was commissioned to create a permanent suspended sculpture, which he titled A Musical Composition, which hangs in Cavern Walks, Mathew Street, Liverpool, to celebrate what would have been John Lennon's 70th birthday.

Mike Badger and The Shady Trio formed in summer 2010 and have released two studio albums and two singles. In 2015 Badger's autobiography The Rhythm & The Tide (Liverpool, The La's And Ever After) was released; it was co written with music journalist Tim Peacock and published by Liverpool University Press.

== Personal life ==
Badger resides in North Wales. He married his long term girlfriend Jeanette in 1999, and they have two children.

== Discography ==
Studio albums

- The Pool of Life - The Onset (1988)
- The Pool of Life Revisited - The Onset (1994)
- Volume - Mike Badger (1999)
- Double Zero (2000) - Mike Badger
- The Onset - The Onset (2005)
- Rogue State - Mike Badger (2011)
- Lucky 13 - Mike Badger and The Shady Trio (2013)
- Honky-Tonk Angels on Motorbikes - Mike Badger and The Shady Trio (2015)
- Volume - Mike Badger Vinyl Re-Release on 9x9 Records (2024)

Archive albums

- Breakloose: Lost La's 1984–1986 The La's (1999)
- Callin' All: Lost La's 1986–1987 The La's (2001)
- Lo-Fi Acoustic Excursions - Mike Badger/ Onset/ La's (2003)
- Lo-Fi Electric Excursions - Mike Badger/ Onset/ La's/ Kachinas (2004)
- Mike Badger's Country Side - Mike Badger/ Onset (2009)
- Breakloose: Lost La's 1984–1986 (remastered) - The La's (2009)
- Callin' All: Lost La's 1986–1987 (remastered) - The La's (2010)
- Badger Tracks - The La's/ The Onset/ Mike Badger/ Roy G. Biv (2014)

Compilation appearances

- A Secret Liverpool (one sided album) - Roy G. Biv (1984)
- A Secret Liverpool - The La's (1985)
- Elegance, Charm and Deadly Danger - The La's (1985)
- Unearthed: Liverpool Cult Classics Volume 1 - The Onset (2001)
- Unearthed: Liverpool Cult Classics Volume 2 - The Kachinas (2002)
- The Great Liverpool Acoustic Experiment - Mike Badger (2002)
- Viper 100 - Mike Badger (2014)
- Mellowtone: Ten Years - Mike Badger and The Shady Trio (2014)

Singles & EPs

- The What Say You EP - The Onset (1990)
- "Another Christmas Carol"/"Everybody's Drinking" single - Mike Badger and The Shady Trio (2011)
- "John Got Shot" single - Mike Badger and The Shady Trio (2014)
- "Beatin' a Path (to Your door)" (2022)
- "Wolfman" (2023)
- "Keep 'em Busy (so they don't look up)" (2024)

== Art biography ==
- An Exhibition of Modern Art Exhibition, The Pilgrim Gallery (Liverpool 1984)
- Merseyside Unknowns (Liverpool 1991)
- British Craft Room, Liberty, (London 1996)
- Tin Can Alley Exhibition, Art Reach (Liverpool 1996–97)
- Lost and Found Exhibition, (Warrington Museum 1997)
- Installation for Manchester's Festival of Food. 14-foot long floating tin fish, toured UK waters (1998–present)
- Lost and Found Exhibition, Tubal Cain Gallery, (Harrogate 1998–99)
- Tin Planet Album Cover/ Billboards/ Memorabilia, Space (1998)
- Avenging Angel Music Video/ Memorabilia/ TV advert, (Bristol Museum 1998)
- Lost and Found Exhibition, Bristol Museum (Bristol 1998–99)
- Lost and Found Exhibition, Leicester City Gallery (Leicester 1999)
- This Morning Television Appearance, (ITV 1999)
- Blue Peter Television Appearance, (BBC 1999)
- Joint Exhibition with Amanda Ralph, Gostin Gallery (Liverpool 2000)
- Transformations Pitt Rivers Museum (Oxford 2000)
- Installation, The Sorting House, (Manchester 2002)
- Installation Artist for Mersey River Festivals (Merseyside 2000–2004)
- Installation Artist for Festivals of Street Art (Merseyside 1996–2004)
- Memory Block English Heritage, Liverpool Community Arts Projects (Liverpool 2004)
- Celebrating Fifty Years of Broadcasting ITV Granada Artist in Residence (2006–2007)
- Go Superlambananas Competition Artist ITV Granada (Liverpool 2008)
- The Beat Goes On Exhibition, Liverpool World Museum (Liverpool 2008–2009)
- Go Penguins Mab Lane Youth Centre (Huyton 2009)
- Mike Badger's Reclaimed World The Vitreum, Merchant Taylor's School for Girls (Merseyside 2010)
- A Musical Composition Installation, Cavern Walks (Liverpool 2010)
- Mosaic Installation, Huyton Station Underpass, Knowsley Community Radio (Huyton 2010)
- Honky Tonk Exhibition, The Bluecoat Gallery (Liverpool 2011)
- Tin Planet Robot Museum of Liverpool (Liverpool 2011)
- In The Window, Bluecoat Gallery display centre (Liverpool 2013–14)
- Mike Badger's Post Pop Art Show Exhibition The Vitreum, Merchant Taylor's School for Girls (Merseyside 2014)
- Installation, The Pen Factory (Liverpool 2015)
- Recycled Art Workshops, throughout North West England (2001–present)
- 'Shoal' Penmaenmawr Promenade (2022)
- Liverpool Community College Window Installation (2024)

== See also ==
- The La's
- The Onset
- The Viper Label
