= Paul Hemmings =

- Born: Paul Jeremy Hemmings; May 1963 (age 62); Liverpool, England
- Genres: Alternative rock, indie rock
- Occupations: Musician, record producer, photographer
- Instruments: Guitar, bass guitar, mandolin, piano, organ
- Years active: 1987–present
- Label: Viper

Paul Jeremy Hemmings (born May 1963, Liverpool) is an English musician and photographer. He composed the theme song for the BBC soap opera Doctors.

== Career ==
From 2000 to 2024, Hemmings composed the theme song for the BBC daytime soap opera Doctors.

Hemmings played with The La's, Mike Badger and The Onset and Ian Broudie and the Lightning Seeds. He is also a partner in Liverpool's independent Viper Label.

Hemmings' current project is called The Floatation Project. Their debut album Sonic Stories was called "understated splendour" by Mojo magazine in May 2005, whilst Uncut said "Guitarist Paul Hemmings can shine from other angles".

The second album Sounds From The Solar System released in October 2006, was called "fascinating, unsettling and unique" by Rough Trade Records.

== Associated acts ==
- The La's (1987)
- The Onset (1987–1991)
- The Lightning Seeds (1994–1998)
- The Floatation Project (2005–present)

== Solo discography ==
Studio albums (as The Floatation Project)

- Sonic Stories (2005)
- Sounds from the Solar System (2006)
- Made out of Worldly Shapes (2011)
- Late Night Blue (2011)

== Session discography ==
- The La's – "Way Out" (1987)
- The Onset – The Pool of Life (1988)
- The Membranes – Kiss Ass Godhead! (1988)
- Neuro – The Electric Mothers of Invention (1993)
- Sensuround – "When I Get to Heaven" (1993)
- Mike Badger – Volume (1999)
- Mike Badger – Double Zero (2000)
- Steve Roberts – It Just Is (2001)
- The La's – Lost La's 1986–1987: Callin' All (2001)
- Aviator – Huxley Pig Part 1 (2002)
- Otaku No Denki – The Future Played Backwards (2003)
- Chris Elliot – Fierce Truth and Fortune (2007)
- Mike Badger – Rogue State (2011)
- Space – "Blow Up Doll" (2016)
- Space – Give Me Your Future (2017)
- The Thomas Scott Quintet – Marionette (2020)
