= List of bands and artists from Merseyside =

This is a list of notable bands and artists from Merseyside, North West England. For over sixty years, the area has had a thriving pop and rock music scene, particularly since The Beatles popularised Merseybeat.

== 0-9 ==
- 28 Costumes: Pop band from Liverpool.
- The 747s: 2006 indie group.

== A ==
- APAtT (a.P.A.t.T.): 2000s progressive pop/experimental rock band
- A Flock of Seagulls: 1980s new wave/synthpop band
- Afraid of Mice: 1980s new wave/post-punk band
- Alexis Blue: 2000s indie pop group
- Alpha Male Tea Party: Math-rock band from Liverpool.
- Alterkicks: 2000s indie rock band led by singer/songwriter Martin Stilwell
- Amsterdam: Led by singer/songwriter Ian Prowse
- Anathema: Formerly a death/doom metal band and alternative rock
- Antimatter: Gothic rock band from Liverpool
- Apollo 440: 1990s dance act which had hits with "Ain't Talkin 'bout Dub" and "Stop the Rock"
- Atomic Kitten: Girl group formed in 1997 by OMD's Andy McCluskey
- Ian Astbury: Rock musician and songwriter best known as the lead vocalist for the rock band The Cult.
- Aystar: Rapper who recorded a 'Fire in the Booth' for Charlie Sloth.
- Jacqui Abbott: Female lead singer with the band The Beautiful South after 1994, following the departure of Briana Corrigan.

== B ==
- Badfinger: Although originally formed in Swansea, two members came from Liverpool.
- Banners: Michael Joseph Nelson, known under the stage name Banners is a singer-songwriter from Liverpool
- The Bandits: 2000s blues rock band
- BB Mak: 1998–2003 pop/rock band, biggest hit "Back Here" was No. 1 on the US Billboard AC chart for seven weeks; sold three million albums worldwide
- The Beatles: 1960s rock band, widely regarded as the foremost and most influential music band in history
- Benny Profane: 1985–1990 indie pop band
- Big in Japan: 1970s punk band that launched the careers of Budgie, Ian Broudie, Bill Drummond, David Balfe, Jayne Casey and Holly Johnson
- The Big Three: Merseybeat band managed by Brian Epstein
- Cilla Black: 1960s singer discovered by Brian Epstein, later to become a successful television presenter
- Black: 1980s singer-songwriter best known for the hit "Wonderful Life"
- The Black Velvets: 2000s rock band
- The Boo Radleys: 1980s/90s Britpop/indie rock band, biggest hit "Wake Up Boo!"
- Peter Beckett is an English musician and songwriter who has written songs for many prominent recording artists, his own bands and solo work, and for several films. He is likely best known as the lead singer and guitarist for 1970s soft rock group Player, which scored a U.S. number 1 hit in 1977 with "Baby Come Back"
- Buster: Rock band from Wirral, later known as Alternative Radio.

== C ==
- Jimmy Campbell: known in the 1960s for bands such as The Kirbys and the 23rd Turnoff.
- Candie Payne: Singer and songwriter.
- CamelPhat CamelPhat is a British DJ and production duo, consisting of Dave Whelan and Mike Di Scala, formed in Liverpool in 2004.
- Carcass: 1990s death metal band and forebears of melodic death metal
- Cast: 1990s Britpop group
- Carcer City, Metalcore band
- Care: Early 80s new-wave band.
- Cecil (band): rock band from Liverpool, active 1993–2000.
- The Cheap Thrills 2010s indie rock band from Liverpool.
- The Cherry Boys 1980s New wave band Byrne, Gunsun, Minns, Hughes
- China Crisis: 1980s new wave band
- The Christians: 1980s/90s soul-influenced sophisti-pop band
- Circa Waves: indie rock band formed in Liverpool in 2013.
- Clean Cut Kid: indie pop band
- Clinic: 2000s acid punk band
- Colonel Bagshot
- The Coral: 2000s indie group inspired by old-fashioned country, 1960s-style psychedelia and folk
- Peter Edward Clarke (born 21 August 1957, in St Helens, Merseyside), better known as Budgie, is an English drummer. His first recording was with The Slits in 1979. He then became the drummer of the influential band Siouxsie and the Banshees (1979–1996) and its side-project The Creatures (1981–2004).
- Conan
- Cook da Books: 1980s new wave band
- The Crescent: 2000s indie band influenced by the La's
- Crawlers, rock band, formed in 2018
- Crucial Three: 1980s "supergroup in reverse" which launched the careers of Ian McCulloch, Julian Cope and Pete Wylie
- The Cryin' Shames: 1960s pop group

== D ==
- Dalek I Love You: 1970s synthpop precursor to Teardrop Explodes, Orchestral Manoeuvres in the Dark & Big in Japan
- Dead or Alive: 1980s synth/dance-pop band
- The Dead 60s: Punk/ska/reggae band
- Deaf School are an English art rock/new wave band, formed in Liverpool in 1973. Between 1976 and 1978 they recorded three albums for the Warner Brothers label, in an art rock style that had its roots in cabaret, moving towards a harder punk rock sound.
- Carol Decker lead singer with T'Pau
- The Dennisons: 1960s Merseybeat outfit. Had two singles in the UK Singles Chart in 1963 and 1964
- The Dirty Mac: A Super group formed by John Lennon.
- Dragged into Sunlight: extreme metal band formed in 2006

== E ==
- Echo & the Bunnymen: 1980s post-punk band, one of the most successful and long-lived of the era
- Ellery Bop: 1980s indie band
- Jennifer Ellison: Reached number 6 in the UK Singles Chart in 2003 with "Baby I Don't Care".
- Electrafixion: Echo & the Bunnymen 1994–1997 side-project
- Engine: 1979–1997 boogie-rock trio
- The Escorts: 1962–1967 band whose members later joined The Swinging Blue Jeans and The Hollies
- EsDeeKid: internationally successful rapper who uses a strong Scouse accent
- Ex-Easter Island Head: experimental minimalist ensemble formed in 2009

== F ==
- The Farm: Indie dance band, famous for the track "All Together Now"
- Faron's Flamingos: Merseybeat band whose members later graced The Peddlers and The Mojos
- Rebecca Ferguson: X Factor finalist whose debut album went platinum in its first two weeks of release. Went on to sign an international deal with EMI to take her music worldwide
- Flamingo 50
- The Fourmost: 1960s Merseybeat band, managed by Brian Epstein and recorded songs written by Lennon–McCartney
- Frankie Goes to Hollywood: 1980s dance-pop band
- Freeze Frame
- Billy Fury

== G ==
- Gerry & the Pacemakers: 1960s beat group, notable for "Ferry Cross the Mersey"
- Gomez: Indie rock band active since the late 1990s, Mercury Prize winners

== H ==
- Half Man Half Biscuit: post-punk surrealist pop band from Tranmere, Birkenhead; formed 1985, disbanded 1986; reformed 1990, still active as of 2024.
- Hazey: rapper noted for a strong local accent, whose song "Packs and Potions" became hugely popular on TikTok and peaked at number 11 on the UK Singles Chart.
- Her's: 2010s alternative pop duo
- The Hideaways: 1960s Merseybeat band in which Ozzie Yue began his career.
- Paul Heaton is an English singer-songwriter. He was a member of The Housemartins, who disbanded in 1988, and a member of The Beautiful South, who disbanded in 2007. He is pursuing a solo career.
- Holy Barbarians: Ian Astbury side project, 1995 to 1997
- Hooton Tennis Club: 2010s alternative slacker band
- Hot Club de Paris: 2000s indie rock band

== I ==
- Ian and the Zodiacs
- Icicle Works: 1980s power pop/new wave stalwarts, led by Ian McNabb. Reformed in 2006 for a 25th anniversary tour
- It's Immaterial

== J ==
- Jamie Webster
- Jegsy Dodd: Performance poet, most active in the 1980s
- Jemini
- Johnny Boy
- Holly Johnson: Former lead singer of Frankie Goes to Hollywood, had solo hits in the late 1980s
- Simon Jones is an English bass guitarist. He played bass and provided occasional backing vocals for the English band The Verve.

== K ==
- The K's are from Earlestown
- King Hannah: Alternative rock duo formed in 2020.
- Kingsize Taylor and the Dominoes
- The KLF: Jimmy Cauty was one half of this duo
- The Koobas
- Billy J. Kramer and The Dakotas: Performed as 'Billy J. Kramer and the Dakotas' and billed as a Merseybeat band when under Brian Epstein's management in the 1960s

== L ==
- The La's: Late 1980s to early 1990s pop/rock band
- Ladytron: 2000s and 2010s electronic music band
- The Lancashire Hotpots are a comedy folk band from St Helens, Merseyside (formerly part of Lancashire), formed in December 2006.
- Lightning Seeds: Indie/pop band, whose frontman Ian Broudie wrote the "Three Lions" music for Euro '96
- The Little Flames: 1960s-inspired indie band
- The Liverbirds
- Loathe: Metal band from Liverpool
- The Lotus Eaters: Early–mid 1980s pop/new wave band. Emerged with another album in 2001 called Silentspace
- Liverpool Express
- The Listening Pool: Former members of Orchestral Manoeuvres in the Dark
- Julian Lennon is a British musician. He is the only child of John Lennon and Cynthia Powell (his father's first wife)
- Rob Lane is an Irish-English rock/pop guitarist

== M ==
- Malik & the O.G's
- Jim McCarty: best known as the drummer for The Yardbirds and Renaissance.
- Marc Almond: lead singer for Soft Cell
- Marseille: 1970s heavy metal band from Liverpool, featuring television celebrity Neil Buchanan
- Marsha Ambrosius: Singer-songwriter, former member of the soul/R&B duo Floetry, she released her first solo album Late Nights & Early Mornings in 2011. Her debut album topped the Billboard R&B chart. Has been nominated for Grammy Awards
- The Maybes?: Band active since 2001
- Mazza L20: rapper whose track "Murdaside" peaked at number 18 on the UK Singles Chart
- George Melly: Jazz musician, writer and expert on surrealist art
- The Mekano Set: Alternative Electro Post-Punk collective formed 2007
- The Merseybeats
- Mic Lowry, pop/R&B vocal group who have supported Justin Bieber
- Miles Kane: Musician originally from the Wirral, best known as the co-frontman of The Last Shadow Puppets and former frontman of The Rascals. Formerly the vocalist and lead guitarist for The Rascals, but announced the band's break-up in August 2009. Pursuing a solo career, and continues to be part of his side-project, The Last Shadow Puppets. His debut solo album, Colour of the Trap, was released in May 2011
- Modern Eon: Post-punk band active 1978–1981
- The Mojos
- The Moonies: alternative rock band
- Nick McCabe is an English musician best known as the lead guitarist of The Verve.
- The Mysterines an alt-rock band.

== N ==
- Brian Nash: Nasher, a former member of Frankie Goes to Hollywood, solo career since 1997

== O ==
- Oceanic: Electronic dance music band from the Wirral.
- The Onset
- Ooberman: Indie pop band (late 1990s–2007)
- The Open: 5-piece indie band (2003–2006)
- Orchestral Manoeuvres in the Dark: (aka OMD) Globally successful new wave/electronic band from Wirral
- Original Mirrors: Enrico Cadillac Jnr's post Deaf School band
- Our Kid: 1970s boy band whose hit "You Just Might See Me Cry" went Top 5 in the UK Singles Chart

== P ==
- Pardon Us: A pop-punk band formed from members of Flamingo 50 and Town Bike.
- The Pale Fountains: Bacharach and Love-influenced early 1980s pop group, led by Mick Head. Later metamorphosed into Shack
- Pele: 1990s Celtic pop outfit led by Ian Prowse. Released three albums on Polydor/M&G and had a number 1 hit, "Megalomania" in South Africa.
- Pink Industry: post-punk band formed after Pink Military split up
- Pink Military: post-punk band
- Henry Priestman: Songwriter for The Christians and member of Yachts and It's Immaterial. Now has a solo career
- Poisoned Electrick Head is an English psychedelic indie rock/punk band formed in 1986 in St Helens.

== Q ==
- The Quarrymen: skiffle group formed by John Lennon.

== R ==
- The Rascals: 2000s band from Hoylake (The Wirral)
- The Real People: Proto-Britpop band from the early 1990s
- The Real Thing: Soul band who sang the 1970s classic "You To Me Are Everything"
- Red Flag: Liverpool-born and US-raised synthpop duo
- Red Rum Club: A Pop rock group known for their use of Trumpet.
- The Remo Four: 1950s–1960s rock band
- Revolutionary Army of the Infant Jesus
- The Reynolds Girls: 1980s vocal duo signed to PWL
- Rezonance Q
- Rick Astley: 1980s and 1990s pop singer
- Riuven: 2000's scouse comedian rapper
- River City People: a folk rock quartet formed in Liverpool in 1986 by vocalist Siobhan Maher, guitarist Tim Speed, his drummer brother Paul Speed and bassist Dave Snell
- The Liverpool Roadrunners: 1960s band
- The Room: Critically acclaimed (by John Peel and others) band from Liverpool, signed to Virgin 10, released three albums and several singles, one produced by Tom Verlaine, between 1980 and 1985
- Rooney: Released three albums from 1998 to 2000 and recorded a Radio 1 John Peel session in 1999
- The Royal Family and the Poor
- Royal Liverpool Philharmonic Orchestra
- The Runaways: UK band of the mid-1960s, better known as Bill Kenwright and the Runaways
- Sir Simon Rattle OM CBE is an English conductor. He rose to international prominence during the 1980s and 1990s as conductor of the City of Birmingham Symphony Orchestra and since 2002 has been principal conductor of the Berlin Philharmonic (BPO)

== S ==
- S.F.X. Boys' Choir, Liverpool
- The Sand Band: alternative folk band
- The Scaffold: 1960s group featuring Mike McGear, Roger McGough and John Gorman. Had a number 1 with "Lily the Pink", and other hits with "Thank You Very Much", "Do You Remember?" and "Gin Gan Goolie" in the 1960s and "Liverpool Lou" in the 1970s
- Scorpio Rising: 1990s indie rock group, whose style is inspired by Manchester's indie dance scene.
- The Seal Cub Clubbing Club: Post-punk band
- The Searchers: 1960s Merseybeat group. No. 1 hits include "Sweets for My Sweet", "Needles and Pins" and "Don't Throw Your Love Away"
- Shack: Cult band led by Mick Head, formerly of The Pale Fountains. Influential on Britpop bands such as Oasis; Noel Gallagher repaid the debt by signing them to his record label
- She Drew the Gun: are a 4-piece dreamy psych pop outfit.
- Short Sharp Shock: Crossover hardcore/thrash band from Wirral
- Siobhan Maher Kennedy: lead vocalist of River City People during the late 1980s and early 1990s, solo career since 2002
- Skinny: 1995 to 1998 indie pop band later known as Monochrome
- Smaller: Mid-1990s indie band featuring Digsy of Oasis fame
- Sonia: Pop singer from the PWL stable. Born in Skelmersdale but mostly associated with Liverpool
- Sound of Guns: Alternative Rock band formed in 2008
- Space: indie/alternative dance band best known for "Female of the Species" and their six other Top 20 hit singles
- Spider: new wave of British heavy metal (NWOBHM) band
- The Spinners Liverpool folk band
- The Spitfire Boys: punk band
- The Stands: 2000s rock & roll band led by songwriter Howie Payne. Split in 2006
- Stealing Sheep: pop band formed in 2010
- Still Brickin: rapper who featured on Digga D's "Pump 101" which peaked at number 9 in the UK Singles Chart.
- Sunday Jones: indie rock band
- Rory Storm and the Hurricanes: Merseybeat group
- Ringo Starr & His All-Starr Band. Super Group.
- Supercharge: 1970s funk/rock band, led by Albie Donnelly and featuring Ozzie Yue
- The Swinging Blue Jeans: 1960s Merseybeat group. Top 3 hits include "Hippy Hippy Shake" and "You're No Good"
- Terry Sylvester was the English guitarist/singer with The Escorts, The Swinging Blue Jeans (1966–69) and The Hollies. In the latter guise, he took on the high parts formerly sung by Graham Nash, who had left the band in December 1968

== T ==
- Levi Tafari
- The Night Café: a British indie pop band
- The Teardrop Explodes: Julian Cope led an ever-changing line-up mixing pop, new wave and psychedelia with commercial success. Split in 1982 after two albums
- The Tempest: 1980s acoustic-pop band, signed to Magnet Records and produced by Glenn Tilbrook. Members included Ian Finney and ex-Prefab Sprout member Steve Dolder
- To My Boy
- Tramp Attack
- Traveling Wilburys: A Super Group that was formed by George Harrison.
- Tremz, real name Tremaine Wiltshire, leading figure in the "Scouse trap" movement of hip hop in a strong local accent.
- The Troubadours: Liverpool indie band, known for the single "Gimme Love"
- Two People
- Timebox: A rock band formed in Southport, known for track such as "Beggin"' and "Poor Little Heartbreaker"

== U ==
- Ultrabeat are a British electronic music group from Liverpool, consisting of producer and vocalist Mike Di Scala and producers Ian Redman and Chris Henry
- The Undertakers: 1960s Merseybeat group, launchpad for the careers of the late Jackie Lomax (bass guitar), Chris Huston (lead guitar), the late Geoff Nugent (rhythm guitar), Brian Jones (tenor saxophone, member of the Glitter band) and the late Brian (Bugs) Pemberton (drums). Today's members are Brian Jones, Geoff Nugent, Bill Good and Jimmy O'Brien (formerly New Image and Rockin Horse). Lomax rejoined the band when he is home in Liverpool.
- Urban Strawberry Lunch

== V ==
- Frankie Vaughan was an English singer of traditional pop music who issued more than 80 singles in his lifetime. He was known as "Mr. Moonlight" after one of his early hits
- The Vernons Girls were an English musical ensemble of female vocalists

== W ==
- Wah!: Pete Wylie vehicle, variously known as Wah! Heat and The Mighty Wah!
- Walkingseeds: alternative rock band formed in 1986
- Wave Machines: Indie band (2007–present)
- Jane Weaver: Female solo artist born in Liverpool and raised in Widnes.
- The Wild Swans: Post-punk/new wave band
- Wimple Winch: Freakbeat band
- Where's the Beach: Techno band who recorded three John Peel sessions and had Single Of The Week in NME for their third single "Sex Slave Zombie"
- The Wombats: Indie rock band formed in 2003 consisting of Matthew Murphy, Tord Overland Knudsen and Daniel Haggis. Best known for their 2007 hit Let's Dance To Joy Division.
- Kathryn Williams released her first album, Dog Leap Stairs on her own Caw Records label in 1999 with a budget of £80. The follow-up, Little Black Numbers, garnered a Mercury Prize nomination in 2000
- Cliff Williams Bassist with AC/DC. Lived in Hoylake.
- Wings: A band formed by Paul McCartney.
- WSTR

== Y ==
- Yachts: power pop/new wave band

== Z ==
- The Zutons: 2000s indie group inspired by 1960s psychedelia
- Zombina and the Skeletones: 2000s pop punk band
