= Music of Liverpool =

Part of the Merseyside region's cultural scene

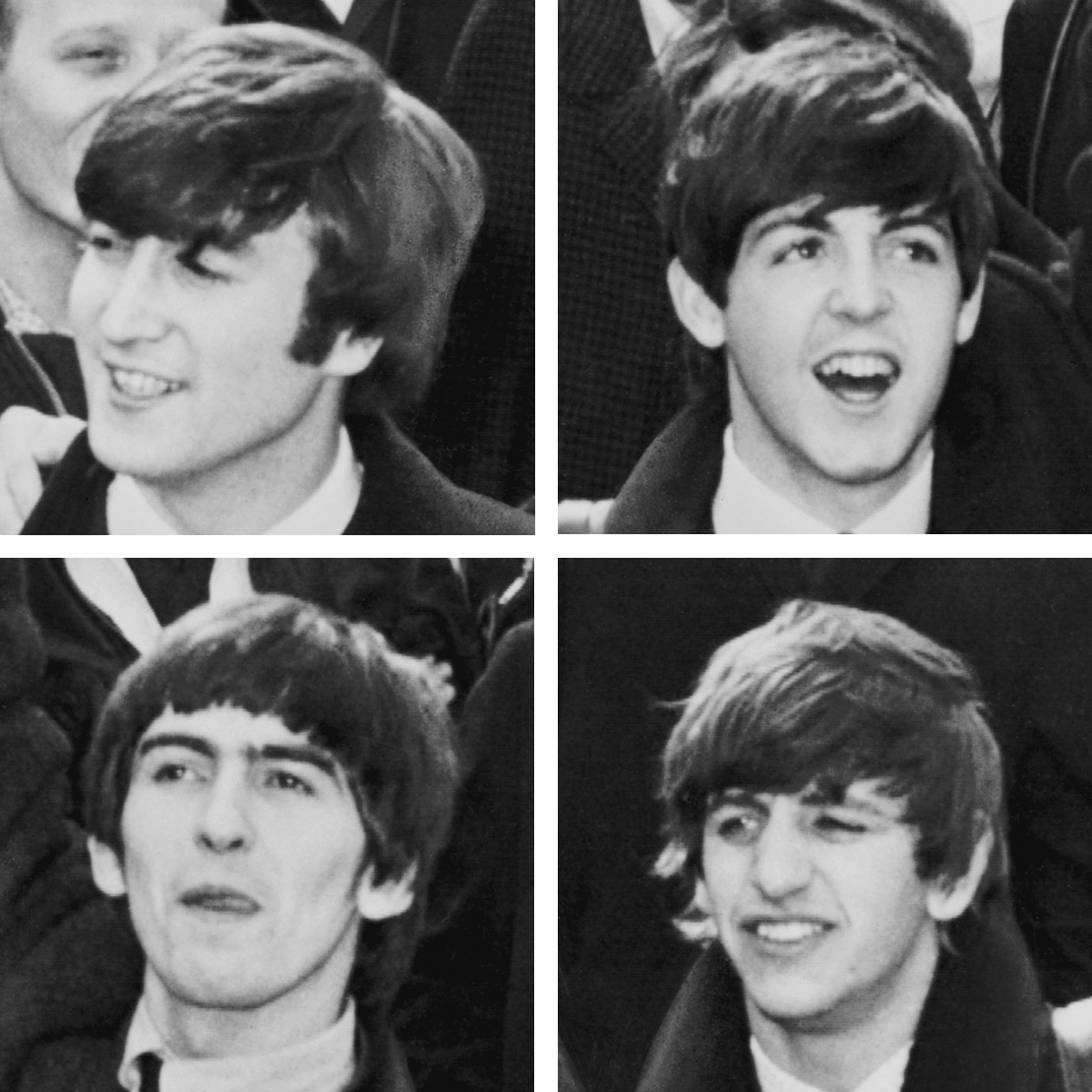
The Beatles are the city's most famous musical exports. They have sold more albums than any other artist

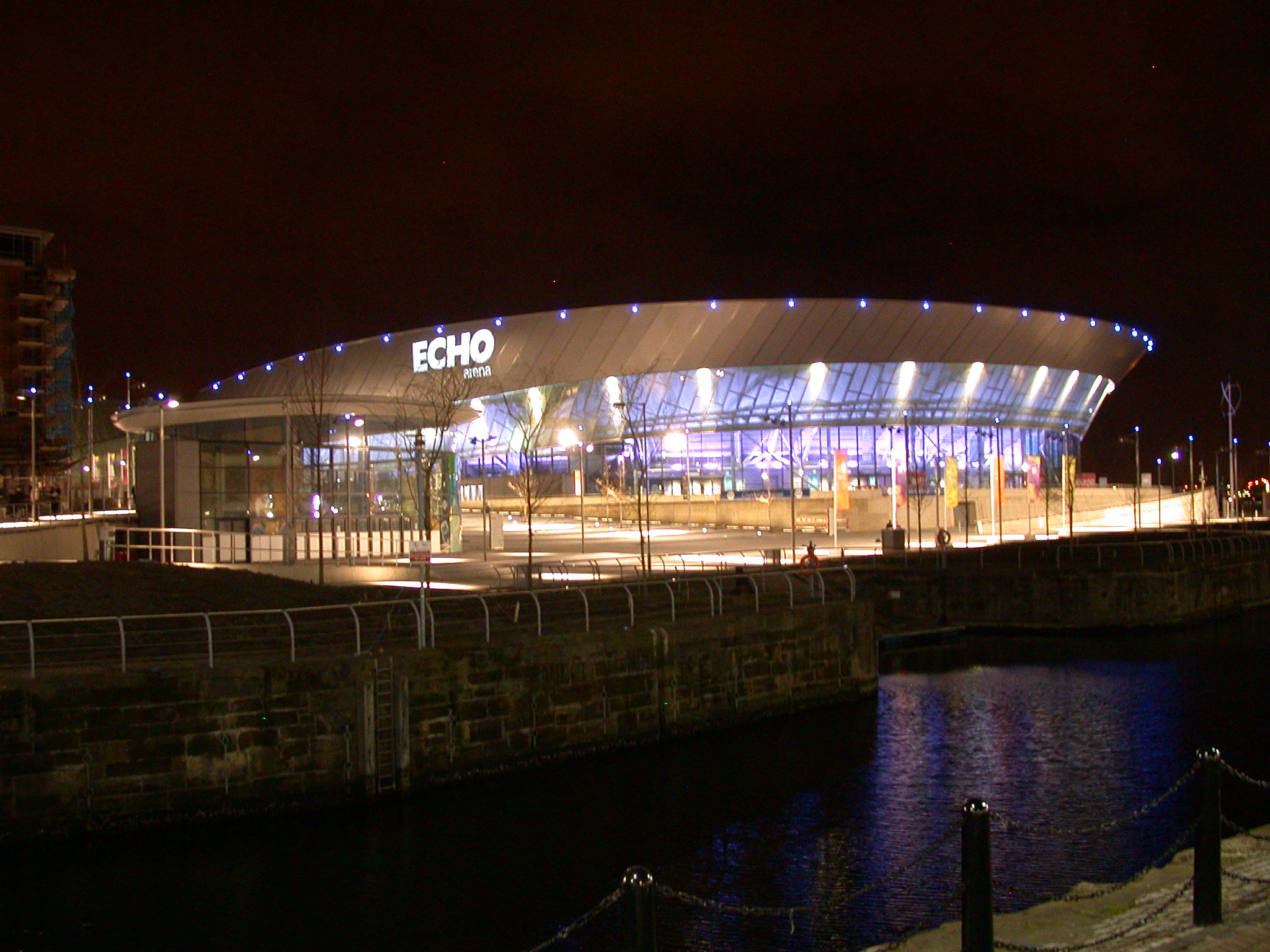
The 11,000 capacity Echo Arena (now called M&S Arena) has held host to numerous world-famous musicians, Eurovision Song Contest 2023 and the MTV Europe Music Awards 2008

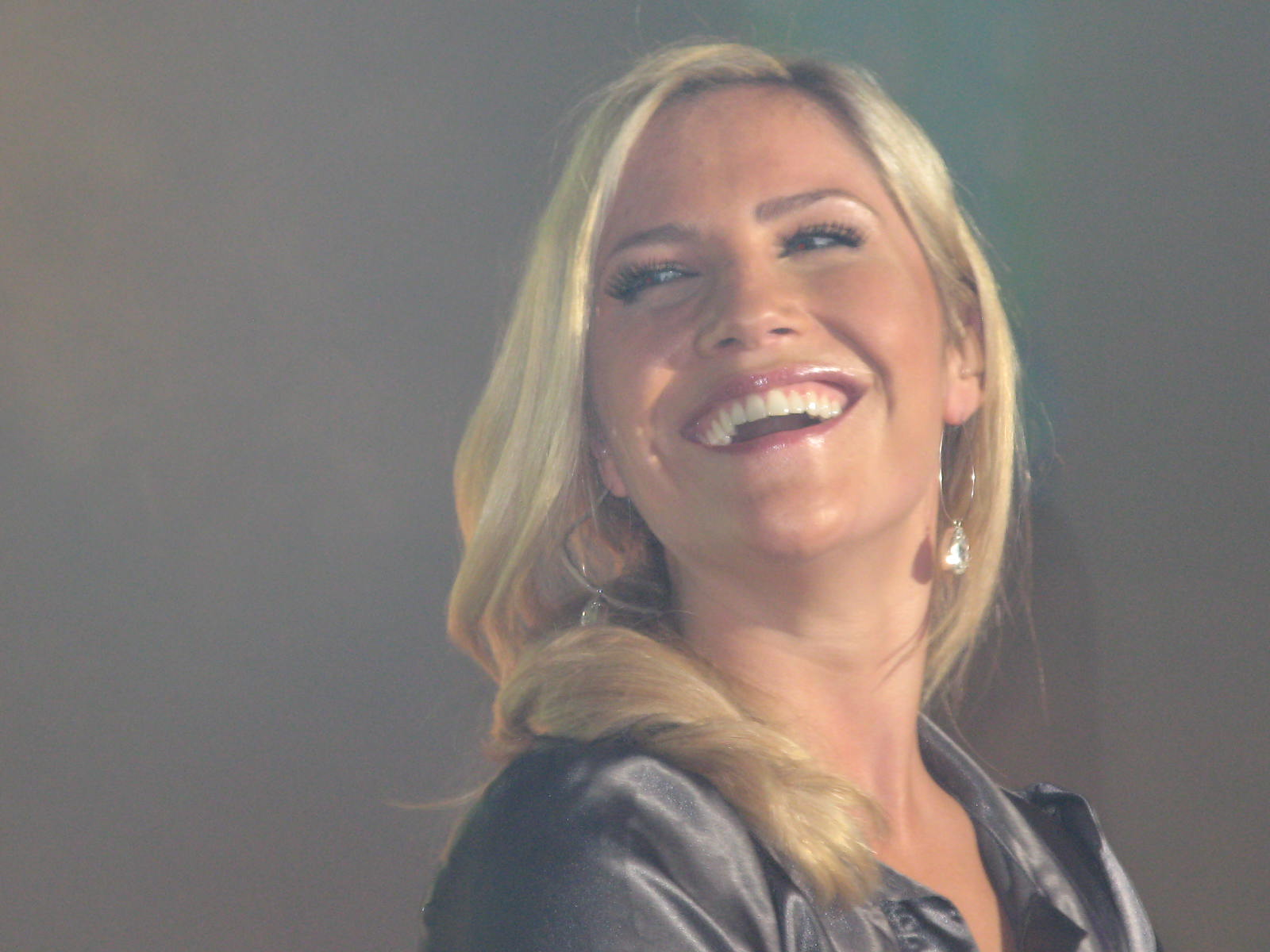
Heidi Range, formerly of Sugababes

Liverpool has a lengthy tradition of music both classical and pop. It is well known for the Beatles (recording 18 UK and 20 US number-one singles). Its pop and rock music scene has also been important in the development of a number of other bands and artists since the 1950s.

== History ==
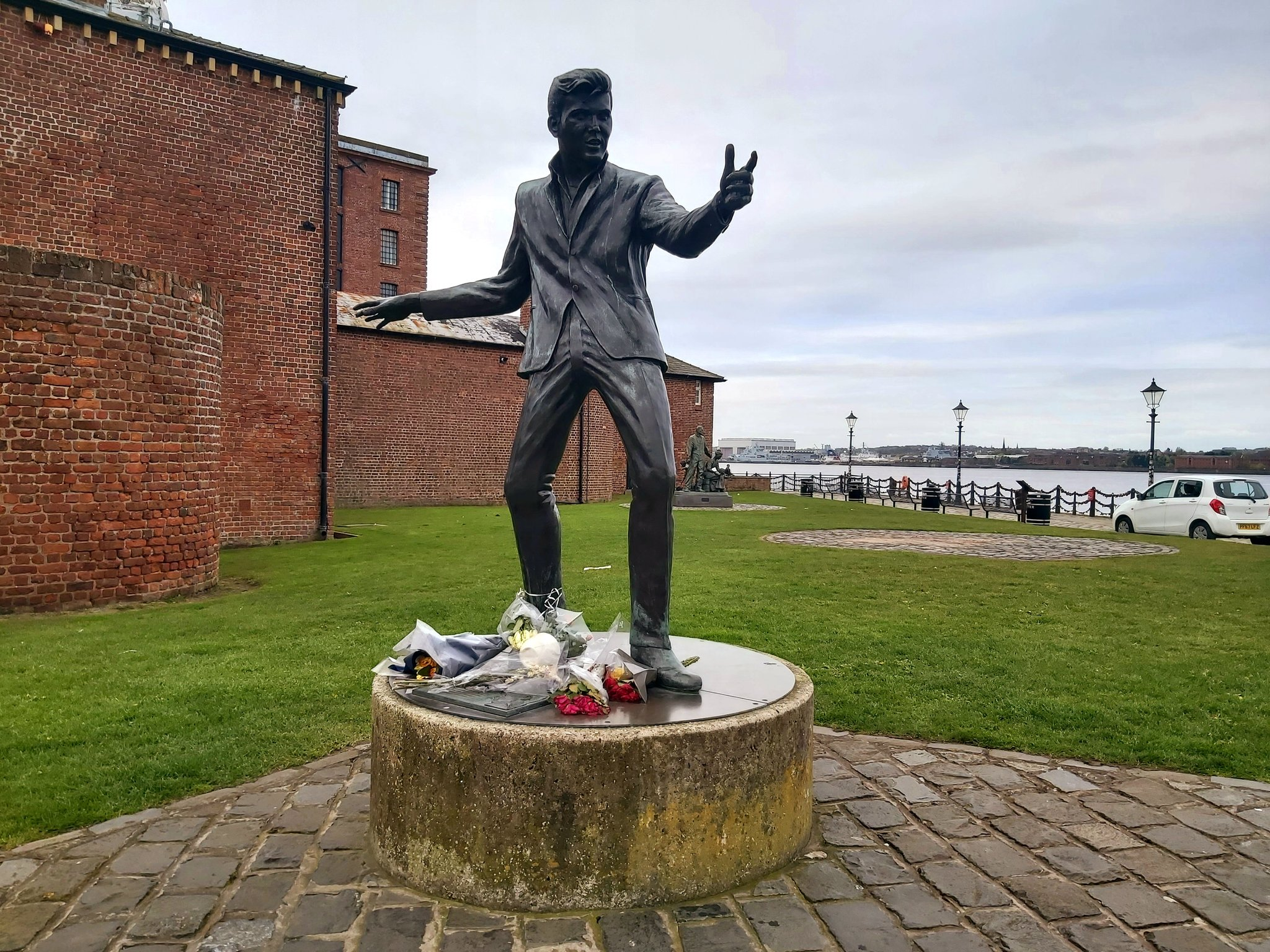
Billy Fury statue, Albert Dock

In 2001, the Guinness Book of Records declared Liverpool the "City of Pop" due to the many number one records to have emerged from the music. The most famous band to have come from Liverpool is the Beatles which played many early gigs at the Cavern Club.

Many sea shanties specifically refer to Liverpool, such as "Heave Away", "Liverpool Judies", and "Maggie May", which was later performed by the Beatles.

In the 1960s, the city was home to the development of the Merseybeat style of pop music, popularised by artists including Gerry and the Pacemakers. However, even before Merseybeat, Liverpool had successful acts such as: Frankie Vaughan, Lita Roza and Billy Fury. In the late 1970s/early 1980s, Echo & the Bunnymen, A Flock of Seagulls, Teardrop Explodes, the Mighty Wah!, OMD, China Crisis, Frankie Goes to Hollywood and Dead or Alive emerged. A punk rock and post-punk scene rose during this period, centred around the venue Eric's on Matthew Street, until its closure in 1980 lead way to newer acts and independent labels with "do-it-yourself" ethos. Record Collector's Tim Peacock said regions of this movement were documented with five compilation albums: A Trip to the Dentist (1980) for Birkenhead; Jobs for the Boys (1985) and its sequel Son of Jobs for the Boys (1985) for Merseyside; Elegance, Charm & Deadly Danger (1985) for St Helens; and Ways to Wear Coats (1986) for Liverpool in general.

1990s bands that enjoyed success were the Boo Radleys, the La's, the Real People, the Farm and Cast. Peacock said the compilation album Dark Side of the Pool (1991) encapsulated the evolving indie music scene in Liverpool in the early 1990s. During the 2000s bands such as the Zutons, the Wombats and the Coral became popular. As a backlash to this style of guitar pop music, another scene far more influenced by post punk and experimental music has emerged more recently, spearheaded by bands such as Space, Ladytron, Clinic, a.P.A.t.T., Hot Club de Paris and Kling Klang. Rappers such as Tremz, Aystar, Hazey, Still Brickin, Mazza_L20 and EsDeeKid have also emerged, using strong Scouse accents.

In 2008, World Museum Liverpool (in partnership the Institute of Popular Music at University of Liverpool) created "The Beat Goes On" exhibition charting the history of music in Liverpool in depth, from 1945 to the present day.

The 2020s saw the introduction of band Girl Group, who formed as university students in Liverpool. They began by playing at local grassroot venues. A fellow all-female group, Girls Don't Sync, followed a similar trajectory during the same time period and have been since been staunch supporters of Liverpool's music and nightlife scenes.

== Music events ==
The Liverpool International Music Festival (LIMF) evolved from the Mathew Street Music Festival, which was the largest annual free music festival in Liverpool attracting over 200,000 visitors to the city.

In 2011 the GIT Award - formed through influential Liverpool music blog Getintothis - was founded. Dubbed the 'Scouse Mercury Prize' by NME, the GIT Award celebrated and championed Merseyside's revitalised music scene. Garnering backing from over 90 businesses and with a judging panel including the Guardian, NME, 6 Music and founder Peter Guy from the Liverpool Echo, the GIT Award nominated 12 artists representing the best artists from that calendar year.

Liverpool hosts several music festivals each year which celebrate and represent the different cultures within the city. Africa Oye is the UK's largest free festival of African music.

Each year the Liverpool Irish Festival is held featuring mostly folk music celebrating the cultural links between Liverpool and Ireland. Liverpool contains a very large Irish population.

In 2017 the music event Melodic Distraction became a radio station in and serving Liverpool.

== Venues ==
The historic 1958 Jacaranda Club opened by The Beatles' first manager Allan Williams still operates to this day, presently co-owned by Graham Stanley of Jacaranda Records. The 1960s saw the emergence of Merseybeat and the Cavern Club, the late 1970s and early 1980s a punk scene centred on another club, Eric's also on Mathew Street, while 1990s dance clubs included Quadrant Park, Cream and Club 051.

The majority of the city's largest and most popular music venues and clubs are located at Concert Square, Mathew Street, Hardman Street and Hope Street, though the Baltic Triangle region of the city has seen a growth in popularity, with a number of venues appearing in previously disused warehouses including Jacaranda Baltic which opened out of Cains Brewery Village in 2024.

Current venues include the Echo Arena Liverpool, East Village Arts Club, The Kazimier (moved to Invisible Wind Factory), O_{2} Academy, Quarry (occupying the former premises of The Magnet), Outpost (the successor of Maguire's Pizza Bar), Camp & Furnace and Leaf on Bold Street. In 2022, the Tung Auditorium opened in the Yoko Ono Lennon Centre. Venues that have since closed include Wolstenholme Creative Space, The Zanzibar, MelloMello, The Kif, Jump Ship Rat, Lomax and The Caledonia.

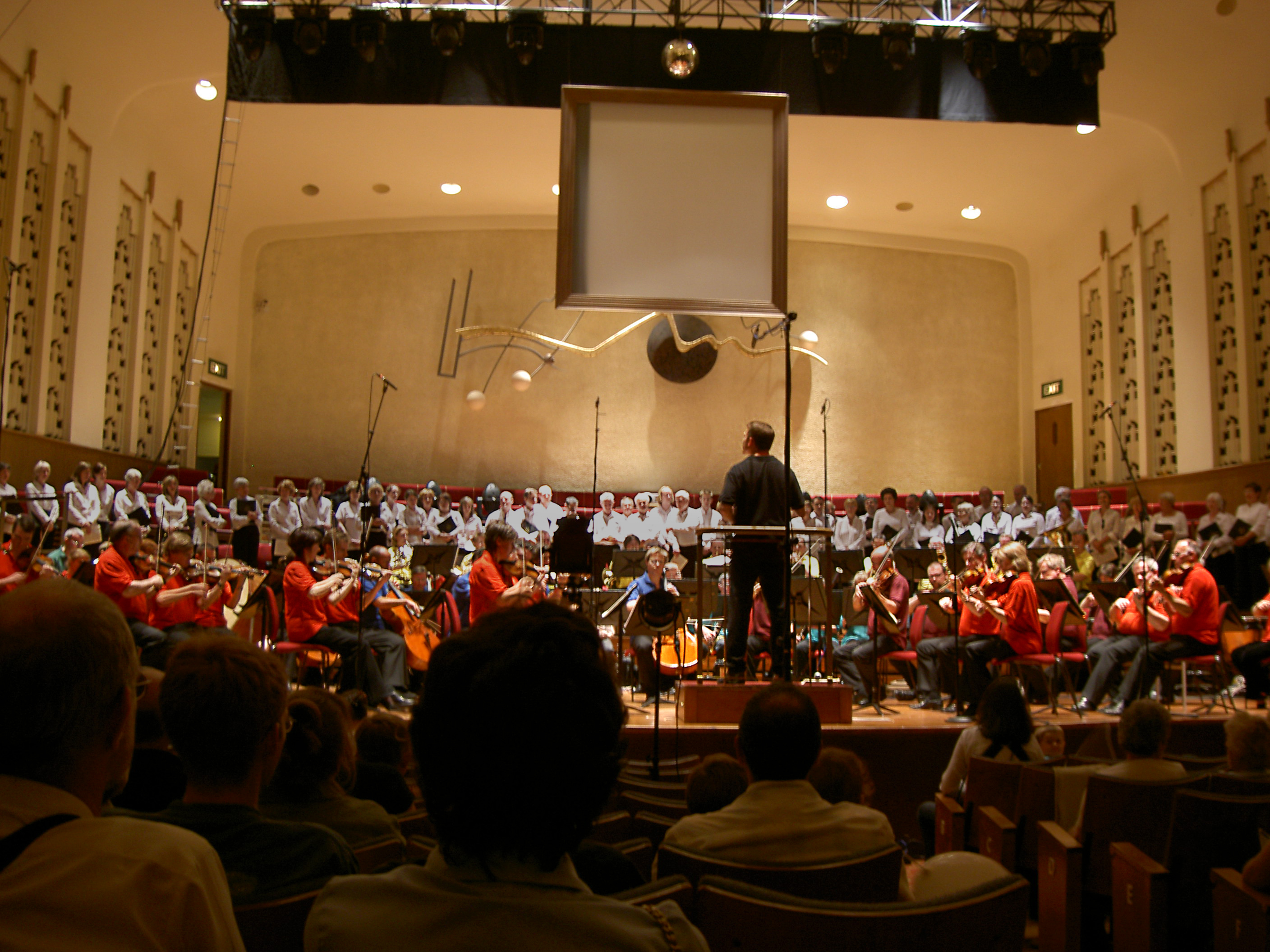
Liverpool Philharmonic Hall

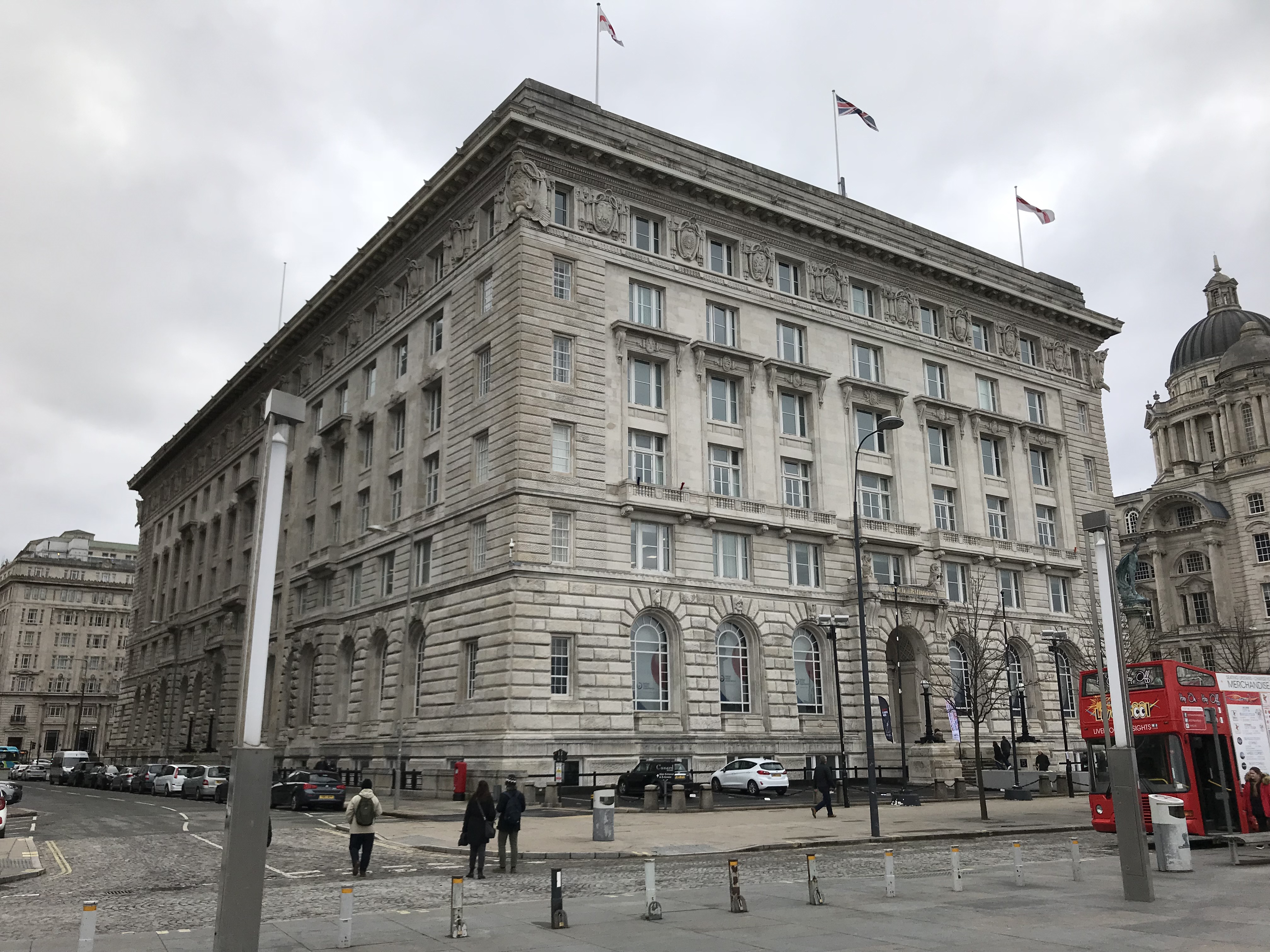
British Music Experience opened in 2015

== Recent notable bands ==
- 28 Costumes
- Alexis Blue
- Alterkicks
- Amsterdam
- Anathema
- Atomic Kitten
- The Bandits
- Candie Payne
- Carcass
- Cast
- Cecil
- Circa Waves
- Clean Cut Kid
- Clinic
- The Coral
- Conan
- The Crescent
- Dead 60s
- Ex-Easter Island Head
- The Farm
- Flamingo 50
- The Glass Skies
- Gomez
- Her's
- Hooton Tennis Club
- Hot Club de Paris
- Ladytron
- The La's
- The Little Flames
- Lightning Seeds
- Mugstar
- Pardon Us
- Pop Levi
- The Rascals
- The Real People
- Riuven
- She Drew The Gun (2015)
- Short Sharp Shock
- Space
- Stealing Sheep
- The Stands
- To My Boy
- Tramp Attack
- Ultrabeat
- The Wombats
- Rivia Band
- The Zutons
- WSTR

== Record labels ==
A number of independent record labels are currently active in the Liverpool scene:

- Big Condo Records
- Jacaranda Records
- The Viper Label
- Deltasonic, now a division of Sony Music, is based in Liverpool and has released music by a number of Liverpool bands.
- 3 Beat Records

== Number-one singles ==
Below is a list of songs by artists from Liverpool that attained the number one position in the UK Singles Chart.

=== 20th Century ===
==== 1950s ====
- 14 March 1953: Lita Roza - "(How Much Is) That Doggie in the Window?"
- 25 January 1957: Frankie Vaughan - "The Garden of Eden"
- 14 February 1958: Michael Holliday - "The Story of My Life"

==== 1960s ====
1960

- 29 January: Michael Holliday - "Starry Eyed"

1961

- 7 December: Frankie Vaughan - "Tower of Strength"

1963

- 11 April: Gerry and the Pacemakers - "How Do You Do It?"
- 2 May: The Beatles - "From Me to You"
- 20 June: Gerry and the Pacemakers - "I Like It"
- 8 August: The Searchers - "Sweets for My Sweet"
- 22 August: Billy J. Kramer and The Dakotas - "Bad to Me"
- 12 September: The Beatles - "She Loves You"
- 31 October: Gerry and the Pacemakers - "You'll Never Walk Alone"
- 28 November: The Beatles - "She Loves You"
- 12 December: The Beatles - "I Want to Hold Your Hand"

1964

- 30 January: The Searchers - "Needles and Pins"
- 27 February: Cilla Black - "Anyone Who Had a Heart"
- 19 March: Billy J. Kramer and The Dakotas - "Little Children"
- 2 April: The Beatles - "Can't Buy Me Love"
- 7 May: The Searchers - "Don't Throw Your Love Away"
- 28 May: Cilla Black - "You're My World"
- 23 July: The Beatles - "A Hard Day's Night"
- 10 December: The Beatles - "I Feel Fine"

1965

- 22 April: The Beatles - "Ticket to Ride"
- 5 August: The Beatles - "Help!"
- 30 September: Ken Dodd - "Tears"
- 16 December: The Beatles - "Day Tripper"/"We Can Work It Out"

1966

- 23 June: The Beatles - "Paperback Writer"
- 18 August: The Beatles - "Yellow Submarine"/"Eleanor Rigby"

1967

- 19 July: The Beatles - "All You Need Is Love"
- 6 December: The Beatles - "Hello, Goodbye"

1968

- 27 March: The Beatles - "Lady Madonna"
- 11 September: The Beatles - "Hey Jude"
- 11 December: The Scaffold - "Lily the Pink"

1969

- 8 January: The Scaffold - "Lily the Pink" (second peak at #1)
- 23 April: The Beatles with Billy Preston - "Get Back"
- 11 June: The Beatles - "The Ballad of John and Yoko"

==== 1970s ====
1971

- 30 January: George Harrison - "My Sweet Lord"

1976

- 26 June: The Real Thing - "You to Me Are Everything"

1977

- 3 December: Wings - "Mull of Kintyre/Girls' School"

==== 1980s ====
1980

- 20 December: John Lennon - "(Just Like) Starting Over"

1981

- 10 January: John Lennon - "Imagine"
- 7 February: John Lennon - "Woman"

1982

- 24 April: Paul McCartney with Stevie Wonder - "Ebony and Ivory"

1984

- 14 January: Paul McCartney - "Pipes of Peace"
- 28 January: Frankie Goes to Hollywood - "Relax"
- 16 June: Frankie Goes to Hollywood - "Two Tribes"
- 8 December: Frankie Goes to Hollywood - "The Power of Love"

1985

- 9 March: Dead or Alive - "You Spin Me Round (Like a Record)"
- 15 June: The Crowd - "You'll Never Walk Alone"

1987

- 4 April: Ferry Aid - "Let it Be"

1989

- 20 May: Various artists - "Ferry Cross the Mersey"
- 22 July: Sonia - "You'll Never Stop Me Loving You"

==== 1990s ====
1996

- 26 May: Baddiel, Skinner & The Lightning Seeds - "Three Lions"

1998

- 14 June: Baddiel, Skinner & The Lightning Seeds : "Three Lions '98"

=== 21st Century ===
==== 2000s ====
2000

- March 26: Melanie C featuring Lisa "Left Eye" Lopes - "Never Be the Same Again"
- August 13: Melanie C - "I Turn to You"

2001

- February 4: Atomic Kitten - "Whole Again"
- July 29: Atomic Kitten - "Eternal Flame"

2002

- January 20: George Harrison - "My Sweet Lord"
- April 28: Sugababes - "Freak Like Me"
- August 18: Sugababes - "Round Round"
- September 1: Atomic Kitten - "The Tide Is High (Get the Feeling)"

2003

- October 19: Sugababes - "Hole in the Head"

2007

- September 30: Sugababes - "About You Now"

==== 2010s ====
2012

- Christmas number one : The Justice Collective - "He Ain't Heavy, He's My Brother"

==== 2020s ====
2023

- November 10: The Beatles - "Now and Then"

== See also ==
- Culture in Liverpool
- Royal Liverpool Philharmonic
- Tung Auditorium
