= Making History =

Making History may refer to:

- Making History (TV series), a 2017 American comedy television series
- Making History (novel), a 1997 science fiction, alternative history novel by Stephen Fry
- Making History (play), a 1989 play about Irish history by Brian Friel
- Making History (Carolyn See novel), a 1991 novel set in Southern California by Carolyn See
- Making History (radio), a BBC Radio 4 programme
- Making History (album), a 1983 album by Linton Kwesi Johnson
- Making History, a 2005 rap album by Screwed Up Click
- Making History: The Calm & The Storm, a 2007 World War II grand strategy computer game
- Making History II: The War of the World, a 2010 World War II grand strategy computer game
