= Quarry, Liverpool =

Music venue in Liverpool

Q U A RR Y
- Logo used in October 2025
- Interactive map of Q U A RR Y
- Address: 45 Hardman St, L1 9AS
- Location: Georgian Quarter, Liverpool
- Coordinates: 53°24′6.2″N 2°58′15.4″W
- Owner: Quarry C.I.C.
- Type: Music venue
- Capacity: 250

Construction
- Opened: January 2020, reopened 26 September 2025
- Closed: 11 May 2025

Website
- quarrysound.co.uk

Quarry (stylised as Q U A RR Y) is an independent music venue and bar in Liverpool, England, known for its progressive programming, community-led ethos, and support for city's underground and LGBTQI+ music scenes. Previously located in the Northern Docks area, it has operated since September 2025 on Hardman Street in the city centre, occupying the former premises of the Magnet and the Sink Club.

Quarry was established in January 2020 in "response to a lack of musical diversity rising in Liverpool's music events after the closure of vital grassroots venues and clubs since 2010," including The Kazimier, MeloMelo, and Drop the Dumbulls. It has since become a well-regarded fixture in Liverpool's music scene and was named by Rough Trade as one of the best grassroots music venues in the United Kingdom. In 2023, noting the fragile position of such spaces, The Quietus described Quarry as providing "a haven for the unusual."

The original Northern Docks site at 17 Love Lane closed in May 2025 following redevelopment of the surrounding area. Artists who performed there include Alison Cotton (ex-Saloon, ex-British Air Powers), Andrey Kiritchenko, APAtT, Big Joanie, Crywank, Forest Swords, God Colony, Hooton Tennis Club, Il Sogno del Marinaio, Islet, Kiran Leonard, Moscow Death Brigade, My Life Story, Kučka, Margaritas Podridas, R.A.P. Ferreira, Russell Haswell, SAVAK, Spare Snare, Stealing Sheep, STONE, Wombo, Zanias, and Zombina and the Skeletones.

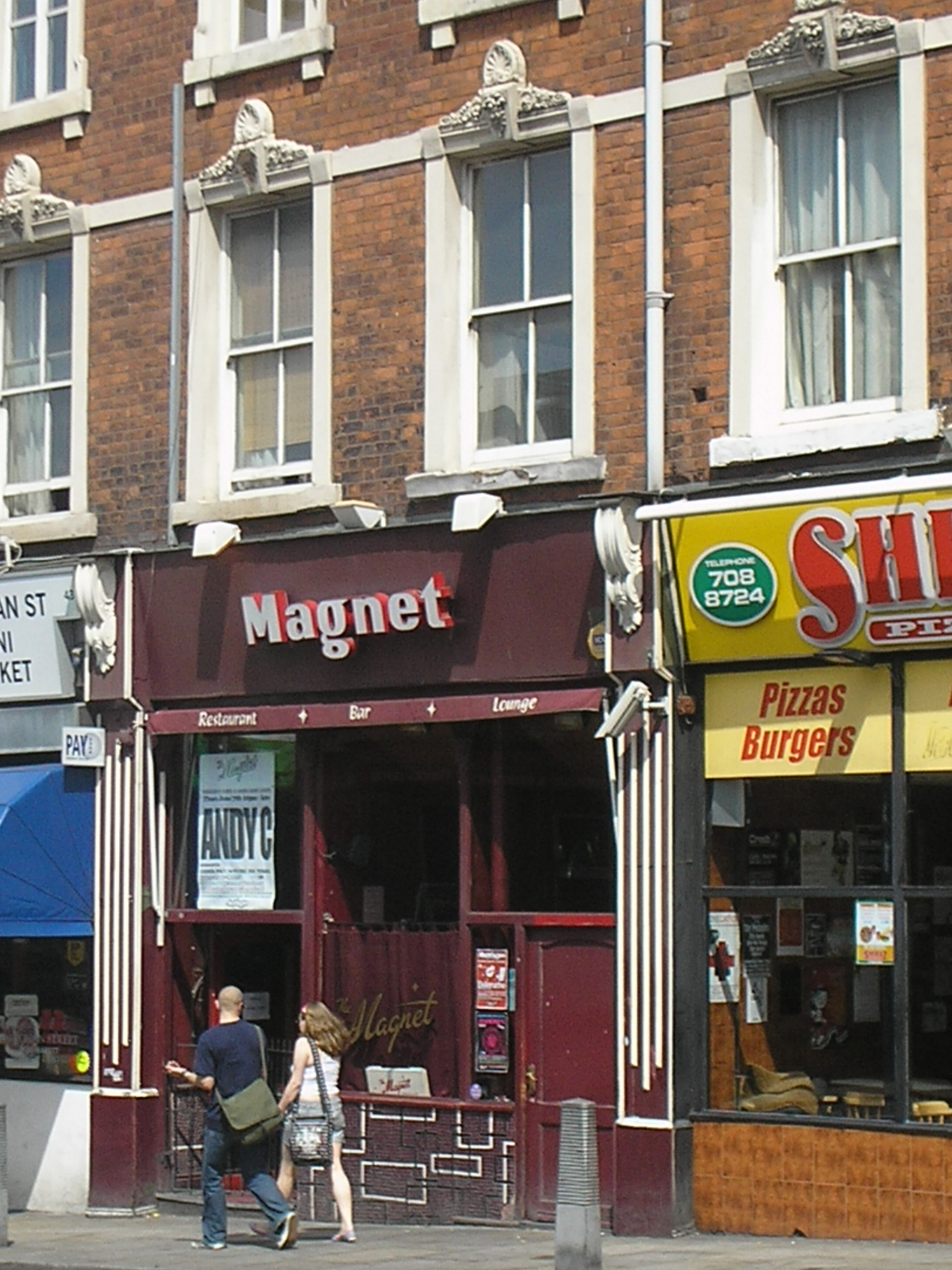
Former Magnet music club on Hardman Street, c. 2005. The basement has been home to Quarry since September 2025.
