= EVR =

EVR may refer to:

== Companies and organizations ==
- Evercore (NYSE: EVR), an American independent investment banking advisory firm
- Evraz (LSE: EVR), a steel and mining company headquartered in England

=== Media ===
- Eighties Vinyl Records, an English record label
- Equal Vision Records, an American record label
- East Village Radio, an American Internet radio station

== Technology ==
- Electronic Video Recording, a video format developed by CBS Laboratories in the late 1960s
- Enhanced Video Renderer, part of the Microsoft Media Foundation multimedia framework

== Transport ==
- Everett Station, an Amtrak station in Everett, Washington

=== Railways ===
- Ecclesbourne Valley Railway, a heritage railway in Derbyshire, England
- Eden Valley Railway, a closed railway in Cumbria, England
- Eden Valley Railway (heritage railway), a heritage railway in Cumbria, England
- Eesti Raudtee, the national railway-company of Estonia
- Elan Valley Railway, a defunct railway in Mid Wales
- Ely Valley Railway, a defunct railway in South Wales
- Esk Valley Railway (Scotland), defunct

== People ==
- Periyar E. V. Ramasamy (1879–1973), Indian Dravidian social activist

== Other uses ==
- Eco-costs value ratio
- Evoked visual response
