= Ian Finney =

English composer, musician, songwriter and actor

- Born: 1966 (age 59–60); Prescot, Lancashire, England
- Genres: Folk; pop; rock and roll
- Occupations: Composer, singer-songwriter, musician, actor, producer
- Instruments: Guitar, Vocals
- Years active: 1984–present
- Labels: Magnet, Probe Plus, Planet Records UK, J & K

Ian Finney is an English composer, guitarist, multi-instrumentalist, songwriter and actor. He was lead guitarist as part of the acoustic pop group The Tempest and is now a solo artist. He was brought up in the town of Widnes, Cheshire.

== Early career ==
Ian Finney was born in 1966 in Prescot, Lancashire, England. Aged seventeen, he signed a £1.25 million deal with Michael Levy's Magnet Records in May 1984 as lead guitarist with the band The Tempest. While later achieving chart success and cult status in Japan and Spain, the group achieved little chart success in the UK, reaching just outside the Top 100.

== The Tempest ==
In mid 1984, Finney began working with producer Gus Dudgeon, who began production on the band's planned first single 'Bluebelle' but it was later postponed and produced by Glenn Tilbrook for the band's third release. Tilbrook produced the band's officially unreleased album recorded between October 1984 and summer 1985 at the Workhouse recording studios as well as the singles 'Always the Same', 'Bluebelle' and 'Didn't We Have a Nice Time?'. During summer 1986 producer Steve Levine produced the band's final single, a cover version of the Small Faces' 'Lazy Sunday'. After completing this session, Finney left the band.

== Later years ==
Finney continued to work in music, producing local artists and playing on a John Peel session. He also briefly played with Sid Griffin's band the Coal Porters.

== Composition ==
Finney has written orchestral pieces used on the History Channel and contributed tracks to video games, including Niall Ferguson's and Muzzy Lane's Making History II: The War of the World.

== Discography ==
=== Singles ===
- "Always The Same" (7"+10"+12") 1985 (Magnet Records - PEST 1)
- "Bluebelle" (7"+12") 1985 (Magnet Records - PEST 2)
- "Didn't We Have A Nice Time" (7"+12") 1986 (Magnet Records - PEST 3)
- "Lazy Sunday" (7"+12") 1986 (Magnet Records - LAZY 1)
- "Colours" (EP-CD) 1993 (Planet Records - PLAN005) (co-written)
- "There You Go Again" (Digital) 2017 (J & K Records - JAK001)

=== Albums ===
- The Tempest (12" unreleased in UK/bootleg) -The Tempest 1986 (Magnet Records)
- Fishing In The Pool - 'Roman Stone' (CD) -Sonnenberg 2007 - (Probe Plus) (co-written)
