= Participatory Chinatown =

2010 video game

- Developer: Engagement Game Lab
- Release: May 2010
- Genre: Simulation
- Mode: Multiplayer

Participatory Chinatown is a video game released and implemented in May 2010 to engage people in Boston's Chinatown neighborhood in the master planning process. It is a multiplayer game designed to be played in a large physical space. Players assume the role of a fictional character in the Chinatown neighborhood and they go on one of three missions: find a job, find a place to live, or find a place to socialize. In the first part of the game, players assume the role of their characters. In the second part of the game, they can act as themselves, and they are asked to prioritize values for the planning process. The players' comments and decisions are shared with decision-makers in the community to help with the development of the neighborhood.

The game was designed by the Engagement Game Lab at Emerson College in partnership with Muzzy Lane, the Metropolitan Area Planning Council and the Asian Community Development Corporation. In 2011, the game was named the best "direct impact game" by the organization Games for Change.
