= Invisible Wind Factory =

Events venue in Liverpool, United Kingdom

- Address: 3 Regent Road; Liverpool; UK
- Coordinates: 53.4183°N 2.9998°W
- Owner: Kazimier Collective
- Type: Events venue
- Capacity: 1,500

Construction
- Renovated: 2016

Website
- thekazimier.co.uk

Invisible Wind Factory is an events venue based in a former factory in Liverpool, UK. It opened in 2016 and has hosted a range of gigs and other events.

== Building ==
The building is at 3 Regent Road, to the north of Liverpool city centre and near to the Stanley Dock Tobacco Warehouse. It was acquired by the Kazimier Collective, already known in Liverpool for the Kazimier club, which closed at the end of 2016. The ground floor was developed into an events space and workshops, the first floor was split up into artists studios and the basement became a second events room known as Substation. The Invisible Wind Factory opened to the public in May 2016, with a multimedia show called Omphalos. In 2018, Paulina Olowska installed a mosaic on the outside wall as part of the Liverpool Biennial. The Kazimier collective is part of the Liverpool City Council's regeneration plan for the Ten Streets zone.

== Events ==
The collective use the exhibition space for events and gigs. It has a capacity of 1,500 people. Musicians who have played at the space include Example, Fat White Family, Peaches, Ride and The Orielles. During the COVID-19 pandemic, the venue closed during the lockdown period starting March 2020 and furloughed its staff. It received grants from the Culture Recovery Fund and Arts Council England. Afterwards, it was used as a COVID-19 testing centre.

The venue planned to host the Futurama Festival which was originally due to be headlined by Heaven 17 and then the New Model Army; after being postponed twice it was definitively cancelled in early 2022. From May 2021 onwards, the events space was also used in the daytime as a rollerdisco.
