= The Dennisons =

English Merseybeat band

- Origin: Liverpool, England
- Genres: Pop, beat
- Years active: 1961–1967; 1991
- Label: Decca
- Past members: Clive Hornby; Steve McLaren; Ray Scragg; Eddie Parry; Alan Willis; Terry Carson

The Dennisons were an English Merseybeat band, that emerged from the Liverpool scene in the early 1960s. Despite their background, and a couple of minor hit singles, they failed to achieve more than a local following and were unable to find a footing on the British Invasion. However, in 1963, Bob Wooler stated that "The Dennisons have created the biggest impact in Liverpool since the Beatles." The band's drummer, Clive Hornby, later became the actor best known for portraying Jack Sugden in British soap opera Emmerdale.

== Career ==
The Dennisons were formed in July 1961, at Liverpool Collegiate, and took their name from a Liverpool street.

They were inspired by another early Merseybeat band The Ravens, who later became Faron's Flamingos. The Dennisons advanced from learning the Ravens' chord patterns, to building a local reputation at the BICC club in Melling, Liverpool. They signed with Kennedy Street Enterprises in 1963, which ensured that they appeared at The Cavern Club, sharing bills with other aspiring acts such as The Beatles. Their original bass guitarist, Alan Willis, was then replaced in December 1962 by Terry Carson (1946–1991).

Their debut single was "Be My Girl" (1963), written by group members Steve McLaren and Eddie Parry. "Be My Girl", released by Decca Records reached number 46 in the UK Singles Chart in August 1963. Offered the opportunity to record Lennon–McCartney's "All My Loving", they declined and lost the potential momentum to make a bigger impact on the burgeoning Merseybeat scene. Their next release was a cover version of Rufus Thomas' "Walking the Dog", with the B-side "You Don't Know What Love Is", written by Ben E. King. It was released in May 1964, and peaked at number 36 in the UK chart. The Dennisons final single release was "Nobody Like Me Baby", in November 1964.

Other tracks they recorded included "Little Latin Lupe Lu", "Devoted to You", "You Better Move On", "Lucy (You Sure Did It This Time)", "My Girl" and "Tutti Frutti". Their lead singer, Eddie Parry (1946–1995), left the group in March 1965. The Dennisons continued as a four piece before disbanding in 1967.

1n 1991, they reunited to perform at a memorial concert for Terry Carson. Former drummer Clive Hornby recorded a solo album, This Is Your Life in 1997, which included musical contributions from fellow former Dennisons, Steve McLaren (1946–2007) and Ray Scragg (born Raymond Arthur Scragg, 4 August 1946, Walton, Liverpool, Lancashire died 7 February 2001). Scragg's death from lung cancer in February 2001 ended all final attempts to relive former days.

== Members ==
- Clive Hornby – drums (1961–1967; died 2008)
- Steve McLaren – lead guitar, backing vocals (1961–1967; died 2007)
- Ray Scragg – rhythm guitar, lead vocals (1961–1967; died 2001)
- Eddie Parry – lead vocals (1961–1965; died 1995)
- Alan Willis – bass (1961–1962)
- Terry "Tex" Carson – bass (1962–1967; died 1991)

== See also ==
- List of Decca Records artists
- List of bands and artists from Merseyside

== Discography ==
=== Singles ===
| Year | Title | UK Singles Chart |
|---|---|---|
| 1963 | "Be My Girl" | 46 |
| 1964 | "Walking the Dog" | 36 |
| 1964 | "Nobody Like My Babe" | - |
