= All Through the Night (The Sand Band album) =

Studio album by The Sand Band
- Released: January 17, 2011
- Genre: Folk music
- Length: 39:25
- Label: Deltasonic

All Through the Night is the 2011 debut album from British folk band The Sand Band. Mojo placed the album at number 38 on its list of "Top 50 albums of 2011."

== Track listing ==
1. Set Me Free 2:48
2. To Be Where You Are 3:32
3. Song That Sorrow Sings 2:39
4. The Secret Chord 3:25
5. Open Your Wings/Interlude 5:47
6. The Gift & The Curse 2:59
7. Someday the Sky 2:22
8. Burn This House/Hourglass 5:10
9. All Through the Night 3:19
10. If This is Where It Ends/Outro 7:24
