= Eighties Vinyl Records =

Eighties Vinyl Records (EVR) is a not-for-profit independent English record label based in Liverpool. The label only releases vinyl records by new local artists, as well as some more established bands.

== History ==
Eighties Vinyl Records was formed in 2012 by Dave Hewitson after winning an auction for a day in a recording studio. The Sand Band who had recently departed from their own record label, Deltasonic, said they would record the first single for the new label. On 17 July, The Sand Band went into Track Studios in Liverpool City Centre to record a single.

On 2 November 2012 the first Eighties Vinyl Record single was released, The Sand Band single 'When We Kiss', a limited edition white vinyl pressing.

In 2013 the label was nominated for a Liverpool Music Award.

On 21 April 2018, EVR announced that they will be producing a limited edition 12-track vinyl LP of the soundtrack of the 2009 film Awaydays, never previously released on vinyl. The music of Awaydays is pivotal to the film and comprises post-punk and electronic music, appropriate for the film's setting and atmosphere, focused on the music of Ultravox and Joy Division.

== Discography ==
=== 7-inch singles ===
- The Sand Band, "When We Kiss" (7-inch single, White) EVR001, 2012
- The Troubadours, "Con Edison" (7-inch single, Red) EVR002, 2013
- Sankofa 'Siren Song' (7-inch single) EVR003, 2013
- The Thespians, "Under Siege" (7-inch single, White) EVR005, 2013
- The Merrylees, "For You/The Coroner" (7-inch single, Cream) EVR006, 2013
- Cold Shoulder 'Tears For Me' (7-inch single,) EVR009 2013
- The Sister Ruby Band, 'Oh Mercy' (7-inch single,) EVR010 2013
- Sunstack Jones 'You Can Help Me Out' (7-inch single) EVR011 2013
- Ian Prowse / Dan Donnelly 'Rosalita/Cecilia' (7-inch single, Green) EVR012 2013
- The Balcony Stars, 'She's Going Down/Restless' (7-inch single, ) EVR014 2013
- Aviator 'Desolation Peaks' (7-inch single) EVR015 2013
- The Reflections, 'Out Of My Hands' (7-inch single,) EVR018 2014
- Sunstack Jones 'Bet I Could' (7-inch single,) EVR019 2014
- Mike Badger And The Shady Trio, 'John Got Shot' (7-inch single) EVR020 2014
- Beach Skulls 'Dreamin' Blue' (7-inch single,) EVR021 2014
- Sankofa Slow Killer City / Vanishing Point (7-inch single, Ltd, Picture disc) EVR 024 2015
- The Stairs Shit Town (7-inch single) EVR025, 2015
- Space Blow Up Doll (7-inch single, Pink ) EVR026 2016
- The Cheap Thrills "Glare" EP (7-inch EP) EVR027 2017
- The Stands Some Weekend Night feat Noel Gallagher (7-inch single, Ltd, Splatter vinyl) EVR028 2017
- The La's Open Your Heart (7-inch EP) EVR029 2018
- The Celtic Social Club / Ian Prowse and Amsterdam Remember Joe Strummer/Joe's Kiss. EVR030 2019

=== 10-inch EP ===
- Sankofa Sankofa (10-inch EP, Orange) EP001 2013

=== 12-inch LP ===
- Various Eighties Vinyl Records - Just Records (LP, Compilation) LP001 2013
- Various Awaydays Soundtrack (LP, Compilation) LP002
- Various Awaydays II (LP, Compilation) LP003
- Various The Business Soundtrack (LP, Compilation) LP004
- The La's Breakloose 1985/86 (LP,) LP005
- The La's Callin' All 1986/87 (LP,) LP006
- Various Scouse Soul (LP, Compilation) LP007
- Various The Football Factory Soundtrack (LP, Compilation) LP008
- Various Stars Are Stars (LP, Compilation) LP009
- Various The Firm Soundtrack (LP, Compilation) LP010
- The La's live 1986/87 (LP,) LP011
- Various The Firm '89 (LP, Compilation) LP012

=== 12-inch EP ===
- The Cheap Thrills Vue Du Monde (12-inch mini album) EP002

=== 7-inch promo ===
- Sankofa "Whitewood Sessions" (7", promo) Promo 001 2013
