= Maguire's Pizza Bar =

- Interactive map of Maguire's Pizza Bar

Restaurant information
- Location: Liverpool, Lancashire, L1 2SJ, United Kingdom
- Coordinates: 53.4030°N 2.9759°W

Maguire's Pizza Bar was a restaurant and music venue in Liverpool, United Kingdom. It was known for serving vegan food and its association with the city's DIY punk music scene. It was listed in The Guardian newspaper's top 10 music venues in Liverpool in 2014 and PETA's list of the UK's best vegan-friendly pizzerias in 2016. Notable bands to have played there include Spare Snare, Zombina and the Skeletones, Billy Liar, Idle Frets, Worriers, Pardon Us, Doe and Martha The establishment closed in September 2018
