= The Sand Band =

British alternative folk band

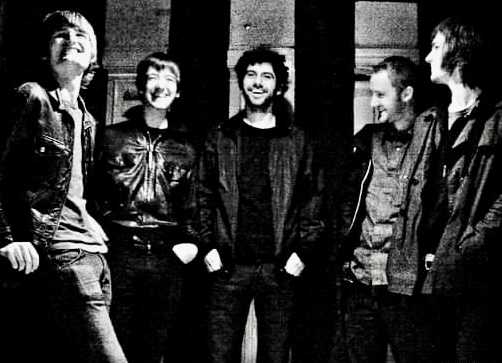
- The Sand Band Liverpool 2010

Background information
- Origin: Liverpool, England
- Genres: Alternative folk
- Years active: 2009–present
- Labels: PIAS Group; Heavenly; Deltasonic
- Members: David McDonnell; Ben Curtis
- Past members: Scott Marmion; Jay Sharrock; Alfie Skelly; Jim Sharrock; Max Goldberg; Phil Murphy
- Website: heavenlyrecordings.bandcamp.com/merch

The Sand Band are a British alternative folk band from Liverpool consisting of guitarist / songwriter David McDonnell and bass guitarist Ben Curtis.

After working in a music shop together in 2002 and playing together for a number of years, David McDonnell and Scott Marmion formed The Sand Band in 2009. Previously McDonnell played live guitar on Richard Ashcroft’s 2002 Human Conditions tour and The Coral’s 2005 The Invisible Invasion tour while Marmion played in Liverpool band Ella Guru. McDonnell played guitar on and helped record The Coral’s The Curse of Love album in 2005 and helped record their 2007 album Roots & Echoes. McDonnell and Marmion got together in 2009 to record All Through the Night at McDonnell’s Sefton Park flat in Liverpool. The band performed at Heavenly Records The Heavenly Social in London and signed to Martin Kelly’s Heavenly Songs publishing. They played Liverpool Sound City festival in 2010. Their first album All Through The Night was released in January 2011 by Alan Wills on Deltasonic records to a positive critical reaction, being described by Mojo Magazine in January 2012 as "one of the best albums of the year". McDonnell was originally part of Noel Gallagher's High Flying Birds band but left for personal reasons. Ben Curtis also plays bass for The Moons. Former drummer Jay Sharrock played in Miles Kane's band.

Digital single ‘Set Me Free’ was released in March 2011 on Deltasonic and featured two B-sides ‘Way Back When’ and ‘All Is Forgiven’. On 2 November 2012 ‘When We Kiss’ and ‘Mistress’ were released on 7” white vinyl to mark the launch of Dave Hewitson's new Eighties Vinyl Records label. All Through The Night also featured John Head of Shack and Ian Skelly of The Coral.

2021 brought a remote collaboration on ‘The Sound of Love Returning’ with ex Minus The Bear guitarist Dave Knudson’s and Sam Bell for Knudson’s solo album ‘The Only Thing You Have to Change is Everything’.

The 10th Anniversary Edition of All Through The Night on 180gm Vinyl was originally released for #loverecordstores day on 4 September 2021 on Heavenly Records and digitally via PIAS Group. Mojo Magazine’s September issue featured the re release in their Buried Treasure section. Hello Global vinyl delays pushed the release to June 2022. It is now available via Heavenly Records Bandcamp page.

== Discography ==
=== Albums ===
- All Through the Night (2011), Deltasonic
- All Through the Night 10th Anniversary Edition 180gm Vinyl (2021), Heavenly Records
- All Through the Night 10th Anniversary Edition Digital + 11 Bonus Tracks (2021), PIAS Group

=== Singles ===
- ’Set Me Free’ – Digital single (2011) Deltasonic
- ’When We Kiss’ – 7” White Vinyl EVR001 (2012) Eighties Vinyl Records

=== Compilations ===
- What The Folk – Butterfly Acoustic Recordings Vol 1 – The Sand Band – Spinnin’ Wheel (2007), Butterfly Recordings
- Reason To Believe – The Songs Of Tim Hardin – The Sand Band – Reason To Believe – FTH100LP (2012), Full Time Hobby
- Pet Sounds Revisited (A Tribute To The Beach Boys 1966 Album) – Mojo Magazine Cover CD – The Sand Band – That’s Not Me (2012), Mojo Magazine
