= The Cheap Thrills =

English indie rock band

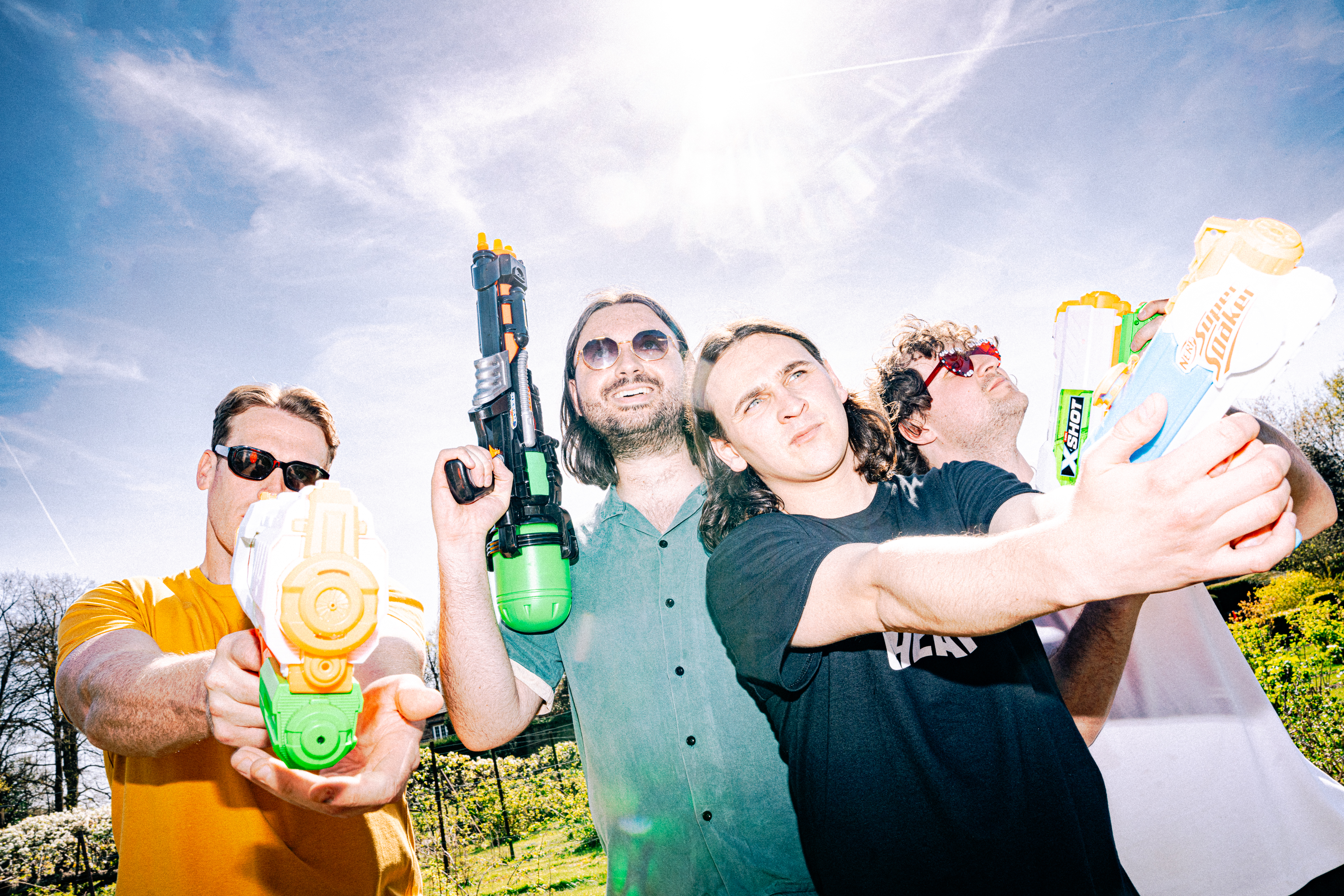

Background information
- Origin: Liverpool, England
- Genre: Indie rock
- Years active: 2019–present
- Label: Keep Cheap
- Members: Lewis Pike; Anton Eager; Terry Eaves; Callum Fitzpatrick
- Website: thecheapthrills.co.uk

The Cheap Thrills are an English indie rock band from Liverpool, England. The group consists of Lewis Pike (lead vocals and guitar), Terry Eaves (guitar and keyboards), Callum Fitzpatrick (bass guitar) and Anton Eager (drums).

Originating from the Walton area of Liverpool, the band's roots lie in childhood friendships and a shared interest in music. Their sound combines indie rock, alternative rock and psychedelic influences, characterised by melodic guitar arrangements, energetic live performances and distinctive songwriting.

After establishing themselves on Liverpool's independent music circuit and releasing a series of early recordings, The Cheap Thrills entered a new phase of their career in 2024 with the release of Mind Metro. This was followed by further singles in 2025 and their debut studio album, Keep Cheap, released on 18 September 2026.

== Background ==
Early years and musical development

The Cheap Thrills originated in Walton, north Liverpool, where school friends Anton Eager and Callum Fitzpatrick began making music together from a young age. They were subsequently joined by Terry Eaves and Lewis Pike, developing their sound through rehearsals, songwriting and performances on Liverpool's independent music circuit.

The band's early live appearances included Kendal Calling and Liverpool Sound City, while their emergence on the local music scene attracted recognition from The Guardian, which featured the group in its Breaking Bands coverage.

The band developed their live reputation through performances alongside artists including Cast, The Real People, The Night Café, DMA's and Jamie Webster.

Their early recorded output included the vinyl EP Glare, released through Eighties Vinyl Records in 2017, followed by the mini-album Vue Du Monde in 2019. During this period, the group received national radio support from BBC Radio 6 Music presenters Steve Lamacq and Tom Robinson.

The single "Codependence" was also recognised by Louder Than War in its annual tracks of the year selection.

The band's live performances extended beyond the United Kingdom, including an appearance at New York City's New Colossus Festival in March 2020.

2022–2023: Liverpool FC collaboration

In 2022, an acoustic recording of the band's song "Codependence" was featured in Liverpool Football Club's European kit campaign for the 2022–23 season. The track's lyric, "We'll follow for a lifetime and a day", was adopted as the campaign's tagline.

The collaboration brought the band's music to an international football audience and reflected their connection to Liverpool and its cultural identity.

The same year, The Cheap Thrills were named Liverpool Band of the Year by Sound Music Group.

2024–2025: Mind Metro and a new chapter

In 2024, The Cheap Thrills released the four-track EP Mind Metro, marking the beginning of a new chapter in their recording career.

The release included the single "Reborn", which attracted coverage from the Evening Standard. The publication described the group as among Liverpool's finest musical icons.

The band followed Mind Metro with new material in 2025, including the singles "Walton Vale" and "Hairs". The releases continued to develop the band's guitar-driven sound and preceded their first full-length studio album.

2026 – present: Keep Cheap

On 18 September 2026, The Cheap Thrills released their debut studio album, Keep Cheap.

The album marked the culmination of the band's recent run of releases, following Mind Metro and a series of singles that established the direction of their latest material.

Keep Cheap became the group's first full-length studio album, following their earlier EPs Glare, Vue Du Monde and Mind Metro.

The band's debut album reached #23 in the Official UK Albums Chart, #1 Uk Album Downloads Chart and #3 UK Independent Albums Chart

== Band members ==
- Lewis Pike – vocals, guitar
- Anton Eager – drums, percussion
- Terry Eaves – guitar, keyboards, synthesisers
- Callum Fitzpatrick – bass guitar

== Discography ==
=== Albums ===
- Keep Cheap (2026)

=== Singles ===
- "Codependence" (2018)
- "Saint or Sinner" (2019)
- "Party" (2020)
- "Walton Vale" (2025)
- "Hairs" (2025)

=== Extended plays ===
- Vue Du Monde 12-inch EP (2019)
- Mind Metro 12-inch EP (2024)

== See also ==
- List of bands and artists from Merseyside
