= Yoko Ono Lennon Centre =

Teaching and performance facility in Liverpool

Coordinates: 53.4027°N 2.9626°W

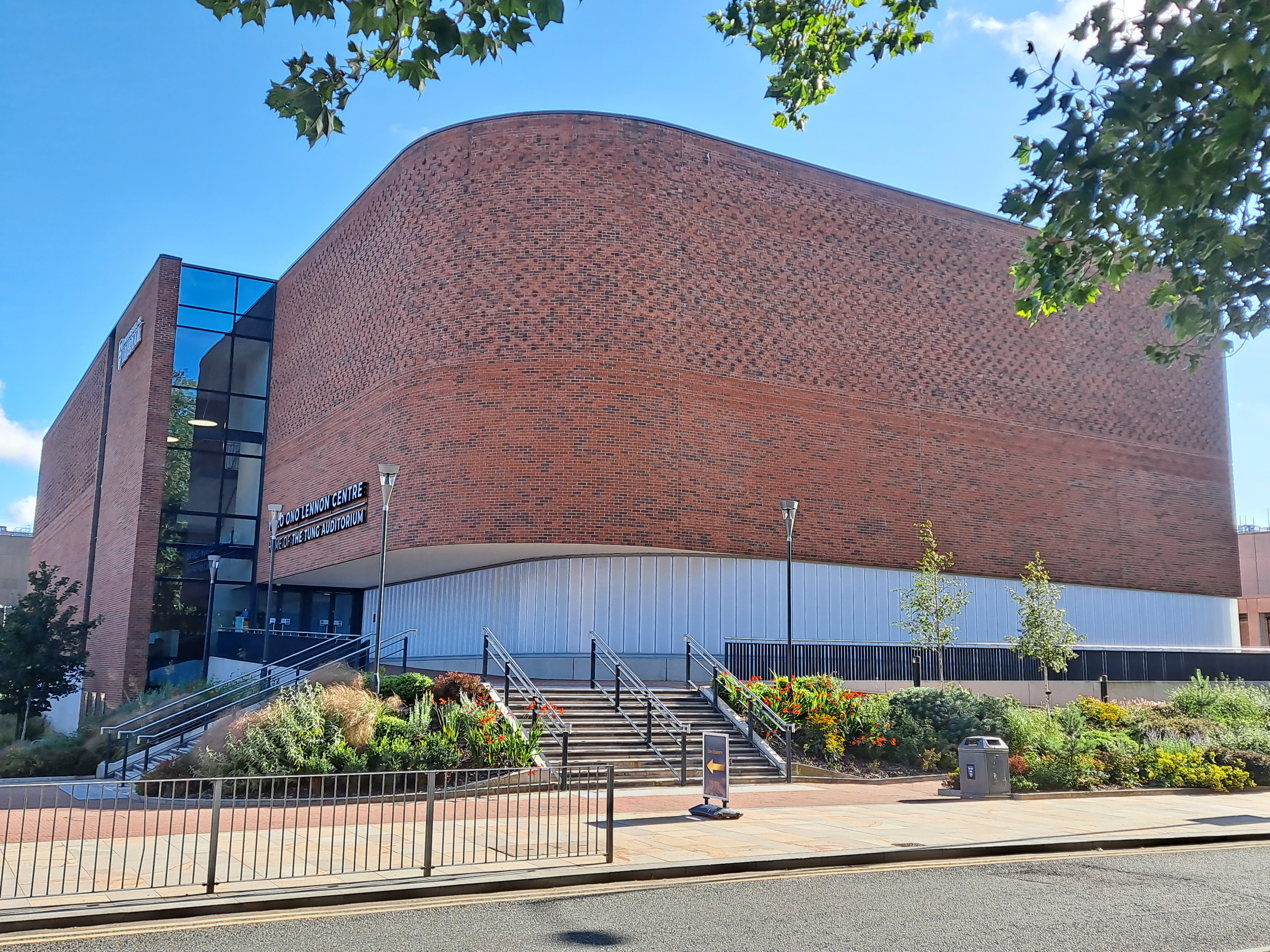
View from Oxford Street

Yoko Ono Lennon Centre is a teaching and performance facility in Liverpool, United Kingdom. Opened by Sean Lennon in March 2022, it is owned and operated by University of Liverpool. It is named after Yoko Ono. Funding was raised for its establishment in 2021. It is located on Oxford Street on the university campus and primarily consists of two spaces.

== Buildings ==
The Tung Auditorium is a world-class medium-size concert hall with space for a 70 piece orchestra (symphony/philharmonic size) and seating capacity for 400 people. It has hosted the Liverpool Philharmonic Choir. The Paul Brett lecture theatre has space for 600 and is used for teaching students. It is the largest lecture theatre on campus.
