= Benny Profane =

English rock band

- Origin: Liverpool, England
- Genres: Post-punk, indie pop
- Years active: 1985–1990
- Labels: Imaginary, Ediesta, Play Hard, Sub Pop UK
- Past members: Dave Jackson; Becky Stringer; Joe McKechnie; Robin Surtees; Dave Brown; Roger Sinek; Liam Rice

Benny Profane were a rock band from Liverpool, England that existed from 1985 until 1990. They released two albums, various singles and EPs, and recorded three John Peel sessions.

== History ==
When The Room split up in 1985, singer Dave Jackson and bassist Becky Stringer recruited Joe McKechnie (guitar/drums, formerly of The Passage) to form Benny Profane. After recording their first demo with Will Sergeant helping out on guitar, they were joined by Robin Surtees. The name was taken from a character in the Thomas Pynchon novel, V. The first release was "Where is Pig?" (the title also a reference to V) on Sub Pop UK (not related to the US label Sub Pop). They then signed to Leeds indie label, Ediesta, releasing three more singles in 1987 and 1988. The band had three drummers at various times, Dave Brown, Roger Sinek and Liam Rice. The band later moved to Dave Haslam's Manchester indie label, Play Hard.

1989 saw the release of the Ian Broudie produced "Skateboard To Oblivion" single and their debut album, Trapdoor Swing. They then switched label again to Imaginary, for a further single and the second album, Dumbluck Charm (the CD version of which also includes the debut album). The band split up in the summer of 1990. Jackson and Stringer then formed Dust, followed by The Dead Cowboys. Dave Jackson released his first solo album on Higuera records in 2010, with Cathedral Mountain recorded and produced with John Head and Tim O'Shea.

== Lineup ==
- Dave Jackson – Vocals
- Joe McKechnie – Guitar/drums
- Becky Stringer – Bass
- Robin Surtees – Guitar

with

- Peter Baker – Organ
- Dave Brown – Drums
- Roger Sinek – Drums
- Liam Rice – Drums
- Will Sergeant – Guitar (on the band's first demo)

== Discography ==
=== Albums ===
- Trapdoor Swing (Play Hard Records, 1989)
- Dumb Luck Charm (Imaginary Records, 1990)

=== Singles and EPs ===
- "Where is Pig?" (1986, Sub Pop UK)
- Devil Laughing EP (1987, Ediesta)
- "Parasite" (1988, Ediesta)
- "Rob a Bank" (1988, Ediesta)
- "Skateboard to Oblivion" (1989, Play Hard)
- "Hey Waste Of Space" (1990, Imaginary Records)
