= The Tempest (band) =

English pop band (1984–1986)

- Origin: Liverpool, England
- Genres: Pop; jangle pop
- Years active: 1984–1986
- Label: Magnet
- Past members: Mike Sheerin; Ian Finney; Steve Dolder; Lyn Smith; Stuart Dunning

The Tempest were an English pop band from Liverpool, active from 1984 until 1986. The group were signed to Magnet Records for £1.25 million and released four singles and an album, recording with producers Gus Dudgeon, Glenn Tilbrook and Steve Levine. Members included Ian Finney and former Prefab Sprout drummer Steve Dolder.

Bass guitarist Stuart Dunning died in January 2024.

== Members ==
- Mike Sheeran – vocals, guitar
- Ian Finney – guitar, backing vocals
- Lyn Smith - backing vocals
- Stuart Dunning – bass, backing vocals (died 2024)
- Steve Dolder – drums
- Jonathan Sumpton - drums

== Discography ==
=== Singles ===
- "Always The Same" (7"+10"+12") 1985 (Magnet Records - PEST 1)
- "Bluebelle" (7"+12") 1985 (Magnet Records - PEST 2)
- "Didn't We Have A Nice Time" (7"+12") 1986 (Magnet Records - PEST 3)
- "Lazy Sunday" (7"+12") 1986 (Magnet Records - LAZY 1)

=== Albums ===
- The Tempest (12" unreleased in UK/bootleg) - The Tempest 1986 (Magnet Records)
