= Making History: The Calm & The Storm =

2007 video game

- Developer: Muzzy Lane
- Publishers: Strategy First (Original Edition); Factus Games (Gold Edition); FriendWare (Spain); BigBen Interactive (France and Italy); Rondomedia (Germany); Akella Games (Russia); Lace Mamba Global (Japan)
- Series: Making History
- Engine: Gamebryo
- Platform: Microsoft Windows
- Release: ^{NA} March 13, 2007 (Win)^{INT} March 13, 2007 (Steam)^{RUS} January 23, 2008^{JPN} February 19, 2010
- Genre: Turn-based strategy
- Modes: Single-player, multiplayer

Making History: The Calm & The Storm is a World War II grand strategy video game released in March 2007 by developer Muzzy Lane. Similar in ways to the popular board games Axis & Allies and Risk, Making History is turn-based with basic industrial, economic, resource, research and diplomatic management included. The game was released as Strategic War Command in Germany.

As of patch 2.03 players are able to play as any nation that had international recognition from 1936 to 1945, although players are encouraged to select from one of the more powerful entities of the era, namely Nationalist China, France, National Socialist Germany, Fascist Italy, Imperial Japan, the United Kingdom, the United States or the Soviet Union.

The game has been successfully marketed by its developer as an educational tool, with the game described in a December 2007 Newsweek article as "already part of the World War II curriculum in more than 150 schools".

On July 30, 2008, Muzzy Lane released the Gold edition of the game. This edition introduces a new "Rise of the Reich" scenario starting in 1933, new combat concepts including separate combat forces for units in attack or defense and the ability for partisans to launch insurrections and liberate unannexed conquered territories, along with numerous improvements to the economic system, such as increasing the supply and price of oil and reducing the cost of food.

Thanks to the fact that the game comes with a scenario editor, players have been able to create scenarios and distribute them over the Internet, expanding the game experience.

The game was translated into Spanish, German, Russian, Italian, French and Japanese on the Gold Edition.

== Gameplay ==
In Making History players control the nation of their choice through a period of World War II and the years preceding it, as defined by the scenario selected. Included with the game are scenarios which start in 1936, 1939, 1941 or 1944, each crafted to reflect the historical situation at that time, while players may design their own scenarios using the either included scenario editor or SQL programming.

=== Main countries ===
The following countries are listed in the default scenarios of the game, however, there is the option to choose other countries.

Nationalist China

France

National Socialist Germany

Fascist Italy

Empire of Japan (Note: Note: the Rising Sun Flag corresponds to the flag of the Japanese Empire's Armed Forces during World War II and not to the official flag used by the Japanese State, however, in the game it is shown as the flag used by Japan at the time.)

United Kingdom

United States

Soviet Union

=== Combat ===
Combat in Making History is resolved through a random number generator and the arbitrary chance to hit, inflict damage and absorb the damage of various unit types. The chance to hit value can be further Modified by supply level, technology, and terrain. Each unit involved in combat is given the chance to attack an opposition unit during each turn of combat.

Units are further broken down into land, air and sea classifications, and the chance for a specific unit to hit an enemy unit is different according to the unit type. A fourth classification of "city" is used to allow the game to simulate medium and heavy bomber raids of industrial infrastructure without the strategic bombers being excessively powerful against military units.

Many sea units possess the ability to absorb some hits without being destroyed and can be repaired in controlled port cities.

=== Diplomacy ===
In-game diplomacy with allied non-player controlled (NPC) countries is generally fairly arbitrary, with each scenario programmable to offer the non-player controlled nations ("NPC"s) one or more war plans to select from at random at the start of the game. Each NPC war plan can be customized to be immediate or in-game event/date-driven; thus in the scenario The Limits of Peace an NPC-controlled Germany is almost certain to attack Czechoslovakia, the NPC USSR will attack Finland, NPC China will attack Communist China and NPC Japan will attack China regardless of any player actions.

Aside from the war plan each nation is programmed to implement the diplomatic system with NPC controlled entities does not lend itself to much use. Relations with NPC-controlled nations are not easy to influence in a positive manner at a meaningful rate and will often only offer or accept alliance propositions when fighting a mutual enemy or facing destruction.

The game has drawn some criticism on its allocation of the conquered territory when conquered by multiple allied forces, with the engine programmed to assign ownership to whichever force arrived first. For example, this can lead to Romania, Hungary or Bulgaria "conquering" and controlling large swathes of the USSR as allies of Germany, despite only contributing minor forces.

=== Economic management ===
Making History features an economic management system that forces players to consider the economic cost of military buildups and waging war, as well as the diplomatic consequences on trade. The game includes a penalty system for controlling the production in regions with an assigned culture different from that of the controlling nation and the ability to liberate annexed countries (thus maximising this production under a new independent but allied entity).

==== Population ====
Each region has a population, and from that population figure, the game creates a workforce, or Manpower Units (MPUs). MPUs are required to run factories, mines, oil fields, or to create new military units. Spare MPUs in each region are automatically assigned to food production, and regional food production is heavily influenced by the amount of labor available in the form of these MPUs.

==== Industry ====
Industrial production is localised in controlled cities, each of which has an Industrial Production Unit rating (IPU). This can be expanded by building Light, Heavy and Advanced Industry. Cities are further categorised as Pre-Industrial, Industrial or Advanced. Pre-Industrial cities are 1-10 IPU capacity, Industrial cities 10–50, and Advanced 50-200, with IPU production capped at 200 for any individual city. Upgrading a city from Pre-Industrial to Industrial and Industrial to Advanced costs further resources, but enables continued industrial expansion. Additionally, more advanced cities require less food and goods, making them more efficient.

==== Infrastructure ====
Each region has food, fortifications and transport rating between 0 and 4, with 0 totally undeveloped and 4 fully developed. Improved food infrastructure increases food production, fortifications add air defenses and give defensive combat modifiers, and transport infrastructure improves mined / oil resource production and the movement speed of land forces passing through that region.

==== Research ====
The game includes a basic technology tree, with some technologies requiring prerequisites be completed first. Base technology starts at a post World War I level and progresses through to Jet Fighters, "Advanced" units representing historical late / post World War II technology, nuclear weapons and ballistic missiles (such as the German V2).

Players can also develop "tactical" technologies (such as Manoeuver Warfare) which confer combat bonuses on attacking or defending land forces.

==== Resources ====
The game includes five basic resource types -

- Goods, required by national economies to function at full capacity, and also to generate cash income. Goods are produced in cities as a result of industrial activity.
- Food, required by national economies to allow population growth, and also to generate cash income. Food is produced in regions from a combination of available labor, the region's agricultural infrastructure and any regional or seasonal penalties (such as winter, or desert terrain).
- Metals, used in the construction of ships, aircraft and armored land forces, as well as arms. Steel is produced in mines located within game regions.
- Coal, used predominantly to feed industrial production, also able to (very inefficiently) produce synthetic oil. Coal is produced in mines located within game regions. Every point of industry (IPU) requires one unit of coal.
- Oil, used to produce arms. Armies without arms quickly lose combat effectiveness, and oil is widely undersupplied through the standard scenarios, making acquiring it a high priority. The price of oil in the game is arbitrarily set significantly lower than the other commodities, despite often being subject to massive demand in the virtual world economy. Oil is produced in oil fields located within game regions.

=== Multiplayer support ===
The game supports up to 8 players playing multiplayer over TCP/IP internet connections, however, offers no formal matchmaking/game lobby systems. Players must arrange multiplayer games privately and manually connect. The multiplayer game is also turn-based, with players making their orders simultaneously and each player's orders being processed at the end of each turn as is normal in a single-player game. For port forwarding port 9103 is used, also Hamachi works.

== Scenario Editor ==
A GUI-style Scenario Editor is included in patch 2.03 and allows customisation of many attributes, including the names, locations and industrial status of cities, the population, ownership, and culture of regions, and the starting technologies, armies, and resource stockpiles of individual nations.

The game is further customisable through the use of the SQL programming language, allowing modification of the preset NPC diplomatic behavior and attitudes, however, these settings are not accessible in the Scenario Editor itself.

The scenarios have been uploaded by users to GameBanana after the official scenario portal was shut down as well as a compilation of old scenarios from the original website.

== Use as an education tool ==
The game has been successfully used as a history education tool in many American schools, with a December 2007 Newsweek article on the use of wargames in education reporting Making History was already part of the curriculum in over 150 schools. The use of the game in local schools also received news coverage in the city the game's developer Muzzy Lane is based in (Newburyport, Massachusetts) in the local newspaper The Daily News.

== Gold Edition ==
On July 30, 2008, Muzzy Lane released a Gold Edition of the game. The Gold Edition features a new scenario "Rise of the Reich" that starts in 1933, new combat concepts including separate combat strengths for units on attack or defense and the capacity for partisans to launch insurgencies and liberate ungarrisoned conquered territories, along with numerous enhancements to the economics system such as increasing the supply and price of oil and reducing the cost of food.

=== New Scenario: Allies vs. Axis ===
On December 1, 2008, Muzzy Lane released a new scenario for the Gold Edition: "Allies vs Axis" as free content on the MAKING HISTORY Gaming Headquarters website. The scenario allows players to control the entire Allied or Axis alliance beginning just as Pearl Harbor is attacked.

The scenario can be found in a compilation after the MH Gaming Headquarters website was closed.

=== New Scenario: Triumph of the Reich ===
On April 20, 2009, Muzzy Lane released a new scenario for the Gold Edition: "Triumph of the Reich" as free content on the MAKING HISTORY Gaming Headquarters website. The scenario proposes an alternate history where Germany and the Axis alliance have captured Europe, key parts of Africa, and Asia. The defeated USSR has dissolved into several new nations, Great Britain has installed a puppet government and fascist powers are bent on capturing the only remaining adversary, the USA. The scenario gives players a rare chance to play the US at a distinct disadvantage.

=== New Scenario: Red Revolution Unbound ===
On December 1, 2009, Muzzy Lane released a new scenario for the Gold Edition: "Red Revolution Unbound" as free content on the MAKING HISTORY Gaming Headquarters website. The scenario allows players to explore the alternate history that is the Soviet Union who sought to speed up the Marxist Revolution.

The scenario can be found in a new website after the MH Gaming Headquarters website was closed.

== Sequel ==
This is the first game in a whole series of grand strategy games. Muzzy Lane released a sequel, Making History II: The War of the World, on June 22, 2010, and continued with Making History: The Great War in 2014 and Making History II: The Second World War in 2018
