= The Room (band) =

English new wave band

- Origin: Liverpool, England
- Genres: New wave
- Years active: 1980–1985, 2023-present
- Labels: Box, Red Flame, LTM, Strange Fruit, 9x9 Records
- Past members: Dave Jackson; Robyn Odlum; Becky Stringer; Clive Thomas; Alan Wills; Paul Cavanagh; Peter Baker; Phil Lucking

The Room are a new wave band from Liverpool formed in late 1979. They released three albums and several singles before breaking up in 1985. Two of the band members went on to form Benny Profane, Dust, and Dead Cowboys. The band reformed in 2023.

== History ==
The Room was formed in 1979 with an initial line-up of Dave Jackson (vocals), Robyn Odlum (guitar), Becky Stringer (bass), and Clive Thomas (drums, percussion). Early releases on their self-financed independent label, Box Records saw the band compared to Joy Division, The Fall and fellow Liverpool band Echo & the Bunnymen, and gained them strong support from the music press and John Peel. They released a cassette album Bitter Reaction in 1980 and two double A-sided singles, "Waiting Room" / "Motion" (1980) and "Bated Breath" / "In Sickness and Health" (1981) via Box.

In 1982, the group signed to Red Flame Records, debuting with the single "Things Have Learnt to Walk That Ought to Crawl", followed by first vinyl album, Indoor Fireworks. 1983 saw major changes to the line-up, with Odlum and Thomas departing to be replaced by ex-Wild Swans drummer Alan Wills, guitarist Paul Cavanagh, and keyboard player Peter Baker. The new line-up released the mini-album Clear! in late 1983. Brass player Phil Lucking was added to the line-up in 1984, but departed before the third album, In Evil Hour, which was part-produced by Tom Verlaine, who the band had played several dates with earlier that year, the remainder produced by John Porter. An EP of tracks recorded for Saturday Live and Janice Long's BBC Radio One programme proved to be the band's final release while still together, in 1985. Clear! and In Evil Hour were later reissued as a double-LP set, titled Nemesis, and an EP of one of the band's four sessions for John Peel's programme was issued by Strange Fruit Records in 1988. Jackson and Stringer formed a new band, Benny Profane, in 1986, and later formed Dust and The Dead Cowboys. The Room's studio catalogue has since been issued on remastered CDs by LTM, with sleevenotes by Dave Jackson.

Jackson released his first solo album, Cathedral Mountain in 2010, recorded with John Head (Pale Fountains and Shack) and Tim O'Shea (Send No Flowers). He is currently finishing a low-budget fantasy feature film called 'Violet City', and has a book of song lyrics called Songs from Violet City due to be published by Headland in 2011. The book includes some Room lyrics and the accompanying CD includes rare Room tracks.

== Discography ==
=== Albums ===
- Bitter Reaction (cassette only) (1980), Box
- Indoor Fireworks (1982), Red Flame
- Clear! (1983), Red Flame
- In Evil Hour (1984), Red Flame
- Nemesis (1986), Red Flame
- No Dream (Best Of) (2004), LTM
- Restless Fate (2023), 9x9 Records
- The Telling (2024), 9x9 Records

=== Singles and EPs ===
- "Waiting Room/Motion" (1980), Box
- "Bated Breath/In Sickness and Health" (1981), Box
- "Things Have Learnt to Walk That Ought to Crawl" (1982), Red Flame
- "100 Years" (1982), Red Flame
- "New Dreams for Old" (1984), Red Flame
- Jackpot Jack EP (Saturday Live & Janice Long Sessions) (1985), Red Flame - UK Indie Chart No. 22
- The Peel Session (1988), Strange Fruit Records
