= Where's the Beach =

British techno band

Where's the Beach was a British techno band from late 1980s and early 1990s, consisting of Pete Jones and Adam Marshall, with vocal contributions from Chloe Mac and later Angie Sammons.

They released three 12" singles on their own Liverpool-based Mantra Communications label, and recorded three sessions with John Peel, in 1989, 1990, and 1992. They were awarded 'Single of the Week' by NME for their third 12", "Sex Slave Zombie". In December 1989, NME had commented that Where's the Beach were one of their tips for stardom in the 1990s. NME's list also included Carter The Unstoppable Sex Machine, The Charlatans, The Mock Turtles, Ride and The Popinjays.

Where's the Beach also undertook gigs supporting The Residents and Aphex Twin, amongst others. In 1996 the contributed a cover of The Fall's "LA" for the compilation Good Evening, We are Not The Fall.
