= Sunday Jones =

English indie rock band

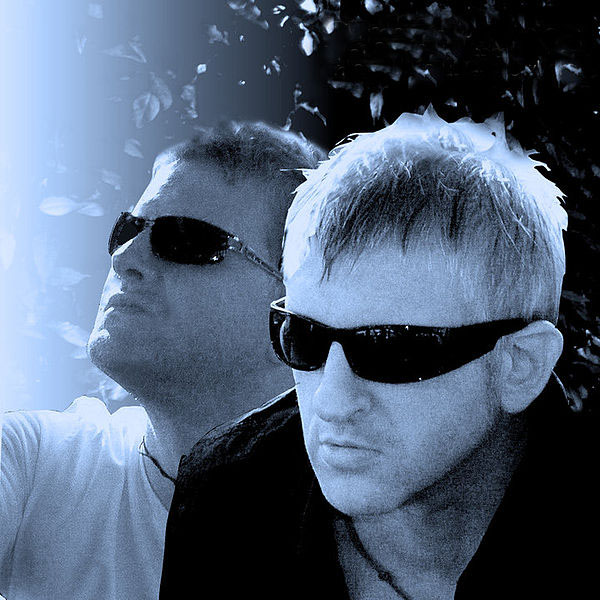

Background information
- Origin: Liverpool, England
- Genres: Indie rock
- Years active: 2009–present
- Label: LoveCat Music
- Members: Dean Jones; Greg Jones
- Website: sundayjones.co.uk

Sunday Jones are an English indie rock band from Huyton, Liverpool, England, published by LoveCat Music in the United States. Their songs are featured in film and TV, such as "Up and Down" in the 2011 movie The One, starring Jon Prescott and Margaret Anne Florence; 2013's The Marine 3: Homefront directed by Scott Wiper starring The Miz and Neal McDonough. (DVD chart ranking in at #12 and #15 on the DVD and Blu-ray lists respectively), and, in 2018, the History Channel’s SIX, an American military drama series.

The band's song "Butterfly" was featured in 2012's Forgetting the Girl directed by Nate Taylor, starring Christopher Denham and Anna Camp. Their songs “Long Wet Day” and “Without” have featured in CBC TV series Heartland. Their songs “This Is Why I Dream” and “Don't Take It Personal” have appeared in Canadian TV series Being Erica.

Sunday Jones are currently recording songs for their debut album.
