= Cecil (British band) =

English rock band

- Also known as: Voy (2000–2001)
- Origin: Liverpool, England
- Genre: British rock
- Years active: 1993–2002, 2016–present
- Label: Parlophone
- Past members: Jay Bennett; Patrick Harrison; Anthony Hughes; Ally Lambert; Ste Williams

Cecil were an English rock band from Liverpool. They released two albums, Bombar Diddlah (1996) and Subtitles (1998). They gained a small degree of commercial success in the UK charts, with their singles, "Hostage in a Frock" (1997) and "The Most Tiring Day" (1998).

== History ==
=== Formation ===
The band formed in Liverpool in 1993. The members were Ste Williams (vocals), Patrick Harrison (Guitar), Ally Lambert (drums), Anthony Hughes (guitar and keyboards), and Jay Bennett (bass).

=== First concert ===
The band took part in a "Battle of the Bands" sponsored by the Liverpool Echo. The band signed a management contract with Raymond Coffer, then later signed with the record label Parlophone (EMI).

They released their first single "No Excuses" with Parlophone in October 1995, which reached No. 89 in the UK singles chart.

=== Tours ===
The band spent the end of 1995 and most of 1996 playing concerts in much of the United Kingdom. They played with bands including Pist.On, The Levellers, Skunk Anansie, Feeder, The Wildhearts and Paw. They also played in music festivals at Donington and T in the Park. Their support show with The Wildhearts in 1996, was broadcast on BBC Radio 1 as part of their then "Sound City" series of concerts, playing after Feeder at the Leeds Town and Country Club, which later closed in 2000 then became a music venue again from 2008 as the Leeds O2 Academy.

Just before this concert, they released their second single "My Neck" in March, which was backed with an acoustic track and a piano version of the single, giving a hint of the direction they were heading in for the recording of their second record. The single charted at No. 93 in the United Kingdom.

Also in 1996, their first album, Bombar Diddlah, was getting good reviews. It was produced by Barrett Jones who in 1995 had co-produced the Foo Fighters' first album.

=== Later history ===
Cecil spent most of 1997 writing songs and touring with the band Mansun. The changes in their sound and production could particularly be heard in the sound of Williams's vocals. By the end of 1997, their new sound could be heard in their new releases "Red Wine at Dead Time" which charted at No. 84 in June 1997, and the late 1996 limited edition single "Measured" which was not produced in enough quantities to chart within the top 200.

Their second album in 1998, "Subtitles", was also produced by Barrett Jones and charted at No. 132 in November of that year; despite being more melodic and well received in reviews it did not sell as well as hoped. Before the release of the album, "Hostage in a Frock" became their first official hit single in October 1997, by charting within the top 75 at No. 68 before "The Most Tiring Day" made No. 69 in March 1998.

The band spent the next few years writing and touring sporadically, finally relocating to the United States, in Seattle, Washington, in 2001 to work with Jones on a third album. After a productive two-month stint, straight after the 11 September attacks, the band went back home to write more songs and booked to go into Stone Gossard's (Pearl Jam) Studio Litho with Jones to record the rest of the third record. This never happened after being dropped from their label, although "Raise a Glass" from the Seattle sessions has appeared on their MySpace module.

=== Reincarnations ===
Cecil were renamed Voy in 2000, working with Mansun producer Mike Hunter to produce 2 EPs also released on Parlophone. Voy later became Fridge Mountain Fires in 2005, during which incarnation they played The Zanzibar Club in Liverpool for BBC's Liverpool Music Week. Ste and Patrick formed a new band, Takotsubo Men, in 2014, and used PledgeMusic to fund their first release.

== Discography ==
=== Albums ===
- Bombar Diddlah (1996)
- Subtitles (1998) – No. 132 (UK)
- Fathom Time (2020)

=== Singles ===
- "No Excuses" (1995) – No. 89 (UK)
- "My Neck" (1996) – #88 (UK)
- "Measured" (1996)
- "Red Wine at Dead Time" (1997) – #79 (UK)
- "Hostage in a Frock" (1997) – #68 (UK)
- "The Most Tiring Day" (1998) – No. 69 (UK)

=== EPs released as Voy ===
- "Canyon EP" (2000)
- "Missile EP" (2001)

== See also ==
- Music of Liverpool
- List of bands from England
