= Stanley Dock Tobacco Warehouse =

Former warehouse in Liverpool, England

Coordinates: 53.4210°N 2.9985°W

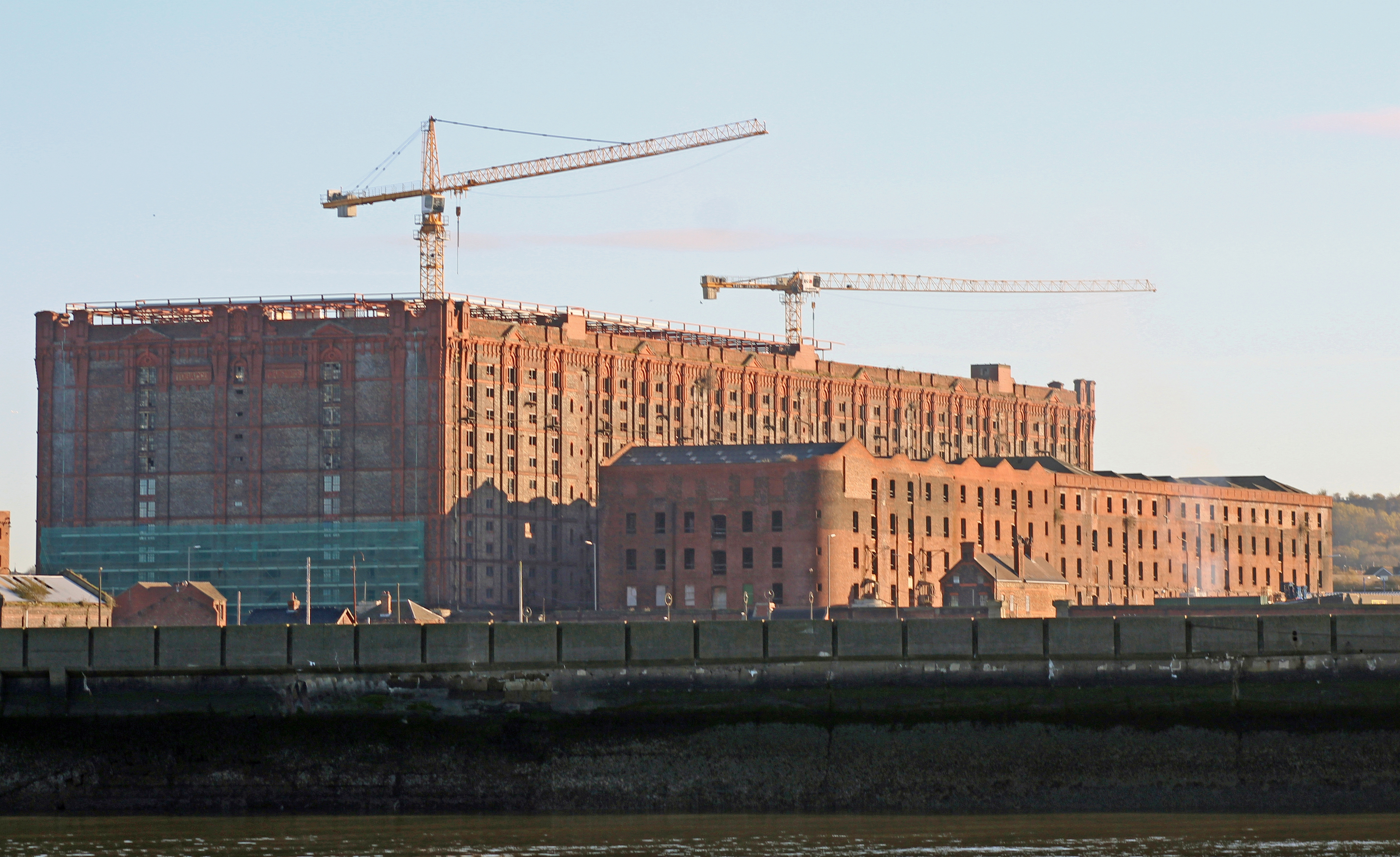
- Interactive map of the Stanley Dock Tobacco Warehouse area

General information
- Location: Liverpool, England
- Construction started: 1900
- Completed: 1901
- Client: Mersey Docks Estates

Height
- Height: 125 ft (38 m)

Technical details
- Size: 36 acres (15 ha)

Design and construction
- Architect: A.G. Lyster

The Stanley Dock Tobacco Warehouse is a grade II listed building and is the world's largest brick warehouse, with a net floor area of 1.6 million square feet (148,644 square metres). It is adjacent to the Stanley Dock, in Liverpool, England. Standing 125 feet (38 m) high, the building was, at the time of its construction in 1901, claimed to be the world's largest building in terms of area. The 14 storey building spans across 36 acres (15 ha) and its construction used 27 million bricks, 30,000 panes of glass and 8,000 tons of steel.

The overall design is by A. G. Lyster, the Dock Engineer, but Arthur Berrington almost certainly played a part. The warehouse was a late addition to the Stanley Dock complex and was built on land reclaimed from the dock. Stanley Dock is accessible from the dock system or by barge from the Leeds and Liverpool Canal which enters under Great Howard Street bridge.

With the decline of trade going through Liverpool, the warehouse fell into disuse in the 1980s and gradually into disrepair. More recently the building has featured in the Stop the Rot conservation campaign by the Liverpool Echo newspaper. Part of the ground floor of the warehouse was used for the Sunday Heritage Market. In 2010, local club promoter Sean Weaver held a warehouse rave on Boxing Day, which saw 2,500 people descend on the building. Acts included DJ Rolando, Kids in Glass Houses' lead singer Aled Phillips and Hatcha, as well as local DJs from the area.

In 2014, Stanley Dock Properties, under the auspices of the Irish company who had previously transformed Belfast's Titanic Quarter, Harcourt Developments, put forward a proposal for the warehouse to be converted into 550 apartments accompanied by businesses, cafes and retail outlets on the ground floor.

Between 2015–2021, Tobacco Warehouse was redeveloped into several hundred apartments as part of a larger development of the whole Stanley Dock site. The plans involved hollowing out the centre of the warehouse to create a garden-filled courtyard and the building welcomed its first residents in 2021.

The complex was listed as one of the key areas of Liverpool City Council's Ten Streets regeneration project in 2017.
