= Making History II: The War of the World =

2010 video game

- Developer: Muzzy Lane
- Publisher: Factus Games
- Series: Making History
- Engine: Sandstone
- Platforms: Microsoft Windows, Mac OS X
- Release: ^{NA} 15 June 2010 (Win)^{INT} 22 June 2010 (Steam)
- Genre: Turn-based strategy
- Mode: Single player / Multiplayer

Making History II: The War of the World is a World War II grand strategy computer game released in June 2010 by developer Muzzy Lane Software. Making History II is the successor to Making History: The Calm & The Storm and gives players the ability to take full control of any world nation, colonies, regions, cities, and military units during the time leading up to and during the Second World War. In 2016, along with the other games in the series, Making History II was sold to Factus Games.

== Gameplay ==
In Making History II players are able to control any nation starting from the years preceding World War II and beyond. The game includes multiple scenarios which begin the player at the following dates: 1933, 1936, and 1939 with each scenario created to realistically reflect historical situations of that time. Other starting dates are playable using mods created with the game editor. Multiplayer games can be conducted via LAN, or using the company's website, which offers a multiplayer service that saves and runs games in the cloud, allowing asymmetrical gameplay. A game update in January 2014 added a fourth scenario that begins in 1944.

== Reception ==
Making History II was met with very low ratings on average at its initial launch. Many of the reviews mention that the game gives the user an information overload due to the amount of information to be processed and the cumbersome GUI which the player is forced to use. In addition to the previous issues, the game also had a fair share of bugs and crashes which only further discouraged proper game play.

In response to the amount of negative criticism aimed at the game, its developer, Muzzy Lane, responded and over the course of 6 months created numerous patches to bring the game up to a playable state. Due to the release of a buggy and "incomplete" game, most of the early negative reviews are based on the earliest adaptations of the game while few reviewers gave Making History II a second look. Making History II garnered a majority of positive reviews in these second looks and later revisions, and was nominated for "Strategy Game of the Year" by Game Industry News. A Mac version was released in 2011, and a game editor was added in the spring of 2012.

Reception

Review scores
Publication	Score
GameSpot	4.0/10
Armchair General	75/100
Avault	4/5

=== Reviews ===
Daniel Shannon of GameSpot, who rated the game a 4/10 said, "the game is plagued by performance issues, uninspiring combat, and an insane depiction of international relations. On the bright side, numerous updates for the game have been released in the past few weeks that have improved performance and crushed numerous bugs, so Making History II might one day be a functional game."

Larry Levandowski of Armchair General gave the game a 75/100 rating, claiming "All-in-all, Making History II is a welcome addition to the pantheon of WWII grand-strategy games. It's fun, easy to play and has enough depth for even the most campaign-hardened strategy gamer. MHII is the kind of game where you start to play after dinner, and when you look up, its 2 a.m."

Jason Iatomasi, of Avault, was the most recent reviewer of the game and gave Making History II a rating of 4/5 and stated, "Nurtured from its pupate state, the motherly developers have woven a cocoon of patches around it. Six months later, it emerges; evolved into something unlike its original state. It is now a pinnacle of grand strategy, rippling with all the promise and depth inherent in the genre."
