= Ten Streets =

District of Liverpool, England

Coordinates: 53.4436°N 3.0092°W

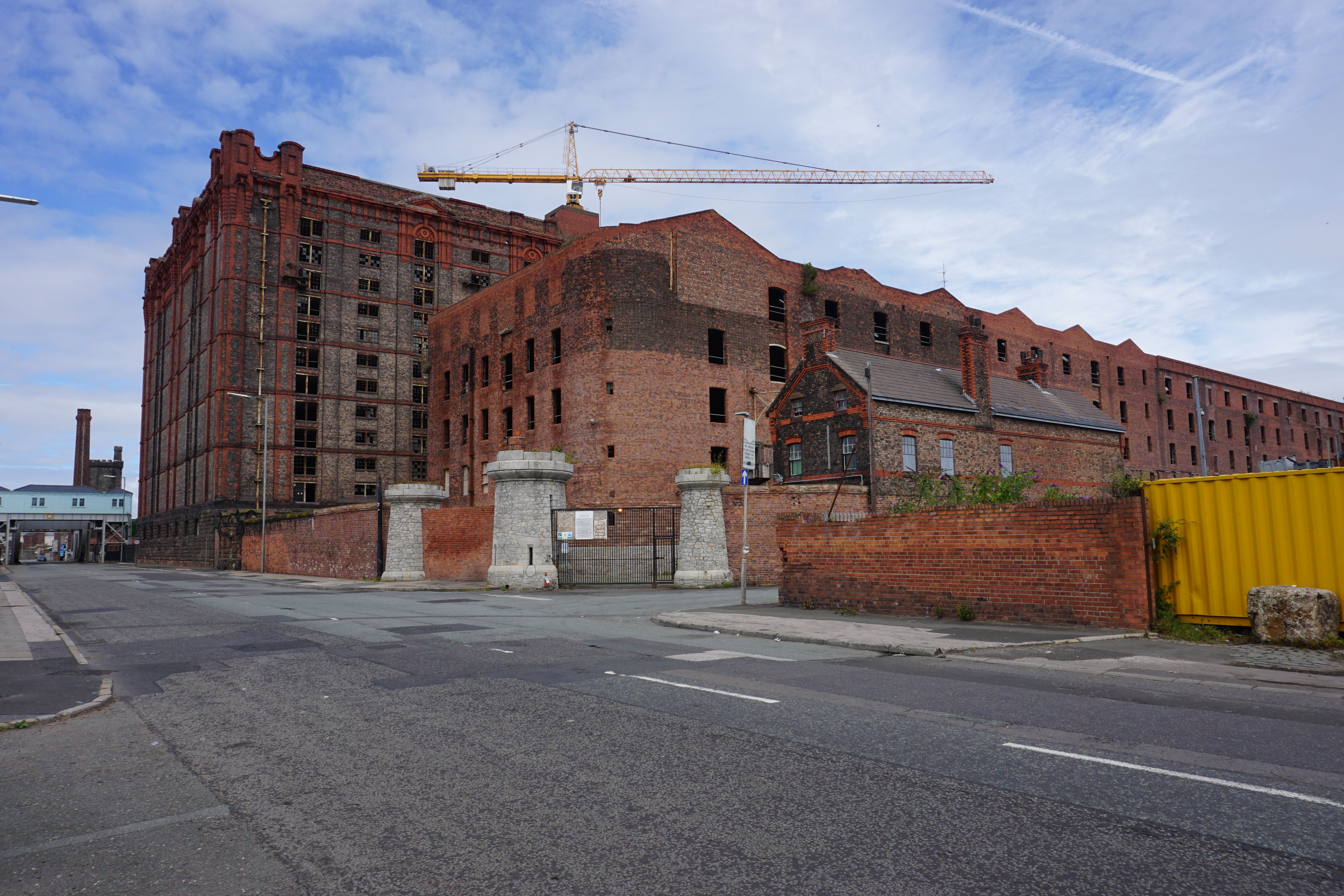
- Regent Road near the Tobacco warehouse

- Location within Merseyside
- Metropolitan borough: Liverpool
- Metropolitan county: Merseyside
- Region: North West
- Country: England
- Sovereign state: United Kingdom
- Police: Merseyside
- Fire: Merseyside
- Ambulance: North West

The Ten Streets is an area of the Vauxhall district in north Liverpool, and is in the northern outskirts of city centre. It takes its name from the ten streets within a designated area alongside Liverpool Docks. It was conceptualized as part of a council redevelopment plan in 2017.

== Redevelopment ==
Liverpool City Council designated a 25-acre area for redevelopment, commissioning a Spatial Regeneration Framework (SRF) plan in 2017. The plan described how the council hoped to increase jobs, regenerate deprived areas such as Kirkdale, provide new housing as well as encourage the growth of artistic and cultural events and organisations. The council hoped to follow a similar success pattern to the Baltic Triangle area of the city.

In January 2025, the council announced it was hoping to include part of the scheme as part of an application to the government for 'New Town' status. The so called 'new town' was to be called 'Liverpool North' (an amalgamation of existing districts), however the government rejected the application for funding plans in September 2025, with the council announcing it was to push on with the plans, regardless.

== Location ==
Based in the Liverpool district of Vauxhall, Liverpool City Council's Ten Streets SPF (Spatial Regeneration Framework) document defines areas that make up this regeneration district:

Ten Streets : The streets that make up the core of the district
Stanley Dock Complex : Including Stanley Dock itself, Titanic Hotel, Tobacco Warehouse and Southern Warehouse
City Fringe : The area to the south that borders the Ten Streets with the city centre
Northern Gateway : An industrial area linking to the Port of Liverpool
Northeastern Corridor : The land east of Great Howard Street, including Atlantic Park
Southeastern Corridor : An industrial area, linking to Eldonian Village and Pumpfields

August 2025 saw the opening of Everton FC's new stadium near Ten Streets, known as the Hill Dickinson Stadium. The stadium is set to be a host venue for UEFA Euro 2028 and the 2025 Rugby League Ashes.

== List of notable landmarks ==
Some of the notable features include:

- Stanley Dock
- Stanley Dock Tobacco Warehouse
- Invisible Wind Factory

== Transport ==
Merseyrail's Northern Line runs parallel with Ten Streets, with Sandhills railway station being the nearest station. The Leeds and Liverpool Canal also passes near by.
