= Packs and Potions =

2022 single by Hazey

Single by Hazey
- Released: 14 January 2022
- Label: Columbia
- Producer: Spherobeatz

Hazey singles chronology
"Hardest U18s Cypher" (2021)	"Packs and Potions" (2022)	"Plugged In" (2022)

Music video
- "Packs and Potions" on YouTube

"Packs and Potions" is a single by Hazey. It was released on 14 January 2022 .

== History ==
In 2021, Hazey was featured on BL@CKBOX's "Hardest U18s Cipher"; his verse on the cipher went viral on TikTok. In January 2022, a full version of the verse was released under Sony Music, receiving over 8 million views on YouTube, as of May 2022.

== Reception ==
The song went viral on TikTok, with the hashtag "packsandpotions" getting 11.5 million views. The song was also praised by fans for putting Liverpool drill "on the map". It was followed in February by a remix of the song, which featured Digga D, M1llionz and Unknown T; the remix was teased on 2 February on an Instagram Live by Digga D.

The song peaked at number 11 on the UK Singles Chart and number 11 on the Irish Singles Chart.

== Certifications ==
Region	Certification	Certified units/sales
United Kingdom (BPI)	Silver	200,000^{‡}
^{‡} Sales+streaming figures based on certification alone.
