= Riuven =

British hip hop rapper

RiUvEn is a British hip hop rapper from Toxteth, Liverpool, well known for his humorous lyrics, but also for lyrics that portray a vivid image of Liverpool scally life.

He became well known in Liverpool following the release of The Riuven EP, containing seven (later versions had eight) of his songs, including "Tha LIV".

He began to gain British national attention after releasing a diss of singer Lily Allen, entitled "Lily Rich Kid Allen", which was noted in several newspapers including British broadsheet, The Guardian.

On 12 January 2008, as part of the opening weekend of Liverpool's year as European Capital of Culture, he appeared on the bill of Liverpool: the Musical - the event which inaugurated Liverpool's new Echo Arena. His appearance was covered by BBC2's The Culture Show. Reaction to his appearance was mixed, as Riuven's intended irony was lost on many watching.

== Discography ==
- EP
- I'm Only Messin Or Am I (debut album)
- "Tha LIV" (single)
- "What Lad" (single)
- Skall Mix (free download album)
- "When Birds Cry & Prank Call" (7" Vinyl LTD edition)
- Riuven Mixtape (2016 album)
