= Muzzy Lane =

American technology company

Muzzy Lane Software
- Company type: Private
- Industry: Educational technology; Video games
- Genre: Educational games
- Headquarters: Newburyport, Massachusetts, United States
- Products: Making History; Participatory Chinatown; ClearLab Project; Past Present; MiddWorld Online; Practice Marketing

Muzzy Lane Software is a technology company developing game-based learning software tools in the Education Technology space. In 2015 they released Muzzy Lane Author, a suite of tools that allow educators to create their own game-based learning assessments.

The company began by creating detailed strategy games with the goal of learning and teaching history. Their Making History series has been used in hundreds of classrooms; which led the company to create several commercial releases in the World War II and World War I eras. They have worked with partners including McGraw-Hill Education, Pearson Education, Cengage Learning, the National Geographic Society, the Corporation for Public Broadcasting and directly with universities. Muzzy Lane published a research study on non-traditional students funded by the Bill & Melinda Gates Foundation in 2016.

In 2016, the company sold the Making History franchise to Factus Games, and is now focused entirely on educational technology.

== History ==
Muzzy Lane Software was founded in 2002

In January 2011, Muzzy Lane moved their offices to the Towle Building in Newburyport due to the need for increased space for their growing team. The company brought in David McCool, CEO and President, a veteran in the start-ups, education, and publishing industries. In 2016, the company moved to Boston North Technology Park in Amesbury, MA.

== Products ==
| Titles | Release year | Platform |
|---|---|---|
| Making History (series) | 2007 | PC and MAC |
| Participatory Chinatown | 2011 | PC |
| ClearLab Project | 2009 | PC |
| Past/Present (for the Center for New American Media) | 2012 | Browser |
| MiddWorld Online (partnered with Middlebury Interactive Languages) | 2011 | PC |
| Practice Marketing (partnered with McGraw-Hill Education) | 2010 | PC/Mac/iOS/Android |
| Practice Government (partnered with McGraw-Hill Education) | 2012 | PC/Mac/iOS/Android |
| Practice Operations (partnered with McGraw-Hill Education) | 2012 | PC/Mac/iOS/Android |
| Underground Railroad (partnered with National Geographic) | 2014 | PC/Mac/iOS/Android |
| SkillBuild | 2023 | PC/Mac/iOS/Android |
