= The Icicle Works discography =

- Studio albums: 5
- EPs: 3
- Live albums: 2
- Compilation albums: 4
- Singles: 21
- Video albums: 1
- Box sets: 1

This is the discography of English new wave band the Icicle Works.

== Albums ==
=== Studio albums ===
Title	Album details	Peak chart positions		
Title	Album details	UK	CAN	US
The Icicle Works	Released: 23 March 1984; Label: Beggars Banquet, Arista; Formats: LP, MC	24	20	40
The Small Price of a Bicycle	Released: September 1985; Label: Beggars Banquet; Formats: LP, MC	55	—	—
If You Want to Defeat Your Enemy Sing His Song	Released: 9 March 1987; Label: Beggars Banquet, RCA; Formats: CD, LP, MC	28	—	—
Blind	Released: 2 May 1988; Label: Beggars Banquet, RCA; Formats: CD, LP, MC	40	—	—
Permanent Damage	Released: May 1990; Label: Epic; Formats: CD, LP, MC	—	—	—
"—" denotes releases that did not chart or were not released in that territory.

=== Live albums ===
Title	Album details
BBC Live in Concert	Released: 28 February 1994; Label: Windsong International; Formats: CD; Recorded on 5 January 1987 at the Golders Green Hippodrome
Live at the Town and Country Club, 1986	Released: 11 April 2011; Label: Beggars Banquet; Formats: digital download; Recorded on 23 July 1986 at the Town and Country Club

=== Compilation albums ===
Title	Album details	Peak chart positions
Title	Album details	UK
Seven Singles Deep	Released: February 1986; Label: Beggars Banquet; Formats: LP, MC; An expanded CD version was released in June 1986 as The Icicle Works	52
The Best of the Icicle Works	Released: 24 August 1992; Label: Beggars Banquet; Formats: CD, 2xCD, MC	60
Lost Icicles Volume 1	Released: 17 November 2008; Label: Self-released; Formats: digital download	—
Lost Icicles Volume 2	Released: 17 November 2008; Label: Self-released; Formats: digital download	—
"—" denotes releases that did not chart.

=== Box sets ===
Title	Album details
5 Albums	Released: 19 August 2013; Label: Beggars Banquet; Formats: 5xCD

=== Video albums ===
Title	Album details
Seven Horses Deep	Released: 1 August 1985; Label: Channel 5; Formats: VHS, LaserDisc

== EPs ==
Title	Album details	Peak chart positions
Title	Album details	UK
Ascending	Released: March 1981; Label: Self-released; Formats: MC; Promo-only mini-album	—
Numb	Released: February 1988; Label: Beggars Banquet; Formats: 12", CD, MC; Essentially a 12" single release of "The Kiss Off" with the same artwork as the 7" single	76
Radio 1 Sessions – The Evening Show	Released: October 1988; Label: Strange Fruit/Nighttracks; Formats: 12"; Recorded at the BBC on 14 November 1982	—
"—" denotes releases that did not chart.

== Singles ==
Title	Year	Peak chart positions								Album
Title	Year	UK	UK Indie	CAN	IRE	NL	US	US Alt	US Dance	Album
"Nirvana"	1982	—	38	—	—	—	—	—	—	Non-album single
"Birds Fly (Whisper to a Scream)"	1983	90	2	19	—	—	37	—	13	The Icicle Works
"Love Is a Wonderful Colour"	1983	15	—	—	25	49	—	—	—	The Icicle Works
"Birds Fly (Whisper to a Scream)"/"In the Cauldron of Love" (double A-side)	1984	53	—	—	—	—	—	—	—	The Icicle Works
"Hollow Horse"	1984	91	—	—	—	—	—	—	—	The Small Price of a Bicycle
"All the Daughters (Of Her Father's House)"	1985	102	—	—	—	—	—	—	—	The Small Price of a Bicycle
"Seven Horses"	1985	80	—	—	—	—	—	—	—	The Small Price of a Bicycle
"When It All Comes Down"	1985	108	—	—	—	—	—	—	—	Non-album single
"Understanding Jane"	1986	52	—	—	—	—	—	—	—	If You Want to Defeat Your Enemy Sing His Song
"Who Do You Want for Your Love?"	1986	54	—	—	—	—	—	—	—	If You Want to Defeat Your Enemy Sing His Song
"Up Here in the North of England" (12" single only)	1986	167	5	—	—	—	—	—	—	If You Want to Defeat Your Enemy Sing His Song
"Evangeline"	1987	53	—	—	—	—	—	—	—	If You Want to Defeat Your Enemy Sing His Song
"Travelling Chest" (Europe-only release)	1987	—	—	—	—	—	—	—	—	If You Want to Defeat Your Enemy Sing His Song
"High Time"	1987	—	—	—	—	—	—	13	—	Blind
"The Kiss Off"	1988	76	—	—	—	—	—	—	—	Blind
"Little Girl Lost"	1988	59	—	—	—	—	—	—	—	Blind
"Here Comes Trouble"	1988	94	—	—	—	—	—	—	—	Blind
"Motorcycle Rider"	1990	73	—	—	—	—	—	—	—	Permanent Damage
"Melanie Still Hurts"	1990	82	—	—	—	—	—	—	—	Permanent Damage
"I Still Want You"	1990	99	—	—	—	—	—	—	—	Permanent Damage
"Understanding Jane" ('92 version)	1992	89	—	—	—	—	—	—	—	The Best of the Icicle Works
"—" denotes releases that did not chart or were not released in that territory.

=== Promotional singles ===
Title	Year	Album
"In the Cauldron of Love" (US 12" single only)	1984	The Icicle Works
"It Makes No Difference" (as Melting Bear; withdrawn release)	1985	Non-album single
"Rapids" (with Jacques Loussier)	1986	Seven Singles Deep
Live at the Albert Lark Lane (live free single with initial copies of "Understanding Jane")	1986	Non-album single
