= BBC in Session =

BBC In Session

Live album by The La's
- Released: 18 September 2006
- Genre: Rock
- Label: Universal

The La's chronology
Callin' All: Lost La's 1984-1986 (2001)	BBC In Session (2006)	The La's: Deluxe Edition (2008)

Professional ratings
Review scores
Source	Rating
Allmusic	4/5 stars
The Guardian	5/5 stars
Pitchfork Media	(8.1/10)

BBC In Session is a compilation of four BBC sessions by the La's, containing the band's session appearances on radio shows hosted by Janice Long, Liz Kershaw, Bob Harris and Nicky Campbell. The songs were compiled from recording sessions starting September 2, 1987 with the last track being recorded October 7, 1990. The album was released on September 18, 2006, to small scale acclaim, being given generally favorable reviews from the outlets that ranked it. AllMusic makes the claim that this album could possibly be the closest example of the “rootsy, stripped back sound” that Lee Mavers was attempting to achieve on the La's debut album, but this is disputed due to material from the La's being in such short supply.

== Track listing ==
All tracks are written by Lee Mavers.

Janice Long 02/09/87
No.	Title	Length
1.	"Doledrum"	2:59
2.	"Way Out"	2:41
3.	"Freedom Song"	2:34
4.	"Come In Come Out"	2:02

Liz Kershaw 31/05/88
No.	Title	Length
5.	"Son Of A Gun"	1:49
6.	"There She Goes"	2:36
7.	"I Can't Sleep"	2:20
8.	"Over"	4:47

Nicky Campbell 01/03/89
No.	Title	Length
9.	"Feelin'"	1:51
10.	"Timeless Melody"	2:48
11.	"Callin' All"	3:31
12.	"I.O.U."	2:06
13.	"Way Out"	2:43

"Whispering" Bob Harris 07/10/90
No.	Title	Length
14.	"I Can't Sleep"	2:34
15.	"Timeless Melody"	2:53
16.	"Callin' All"	3:42
17.	"Feelin'"	1:50

== Personnel ==
The La's

- Lee Mavers – lead vocals, guitar
- John Power – bass, backing vocals
- Paul Hemmings – guitar (tracks 1–4)
- John Timson (credited as Timo Timson) – drums (tracks 1–4)
- Iain Templeton – drums (tracks 5–8)
- Chris Sharrock – drums (tracks 9–13)
- Barry Sutton – guitar (tracks 9–13)
- Neil Mavers – drums (tracks 14–17)
- Peter Cammell (credited as Peter Camille) – guitar (tracks 14–17)

Production

- Peter Watts – producer (tracks 1–8)
- Phil Stannard – engineer (tracks 1–4)
- Fred Kay – engineer (tracks 1–4)
- Martyn Parker – engineer (tracks 5–13)
- Harry Parker – producer (tracks 9–13)
- Miti Adhikari – producer (tracks 14–17)
- Paul Allen – engineer (tracks 14–17)
- M.W. Macefield – liner notes
