= Feelin' =

Single by The La's

from the album The La's
- B-side: "Doledrum"; "I.O.U."; "Liberty Ship"
- Released: 4 February 1991
- Recorded: 1989–1990; Eden Studio, London
- Genre: Britpop; pop
- Length: 1:50
- Label: Go! Discs (GOLAS 6)
- Songwriter: L.A. Mavers
- Producer: Steve Lillywhite

The La's singles chronology
"There She Goes" (1990)	"Feelin'" (1991)	"There She Goes" (1999)

Music video
- "Feelin'" on YouTube

"Feelin'" is a song by English rock band the La's, released in February 1991 by Go! Discs as the final single from their debut album, The La's (1990). It was written by L.A. Mavers and produced by Steve Lillywhite. The song peaked at number 43 on the UK Singles Chart. The accompanying music video contains the same live performance footage as the "Timeless Melody" video clip. The video ends with the camera freezing its scope on the band.

== Formats and track listings ==
- All songs written by L.A. Mavers.

7" single (GOLAS 6)
Cassette single (LASMC 6)

1. "Feelin'" – 1:50
2. "Doledrum" – 2:52

7" EP (GOLAB 6)

1. "Feelin'" – 1:50
2. "I.O.U." (alternate version) – 2:09
3. "Feelin'" (alternate version) – 2:04
4. "Doledrum" – 2:52

12" single (GOLAS 612)
CD single (LASCD 6)

1. "Feelin'" – 1:50
2. "Doledrum" – 2:52
3. "I.O.U." (alternate version) – 2:09
4. "Liberty Ship" – 2:30

== Personnel ==
The La's

- Lee Mavers – guitar, vocals
- John Power – bass, backing vocals
- Peter "Cammy" Camell – guitar
- Neil Mavers – drums
- Barry Sutton – guitar (on "I.O.U" alternate version)
- Chris Sharrock – drums (on "I.O.U" alternate version)
- Iain Templeton – drums (on "Feelin'" alternate version)

Production

- Steve Lillywhite – producer, mixing
- Mark Wallis – additional producer, engineer
- Dave Charles – engineer
- Mike Hedges – producer (on "I.O.U" alternate version)
- Ian Grimble – engineer, mixing (on "I.O.U" alternate version)
- John Leckie – producer (on "Feelin'" alternate version)
- Barry Hammond – engineer (on "Feelin'" alternate version)
- Mike Shepherd – engineer (on "Feelin'" alternate version)

Other personnel

- Ryan Art – design

== Charts ==
Chart (1991)	Peak position
UK Singles (OCC)	43
UK Airplay (Music Week)	21
