= I Can't Sleep =

I Can't Sleep may refer to:

- I Can't Sleep (film) (French: J'ai pas sommeil), a film by Claire Denis
- "I Can't Sleep" (song), a song by Clay Walker
- "I Can't Sleep", a song by British rock band The La's, from their self-titled album
