= The Crescent (band) =

British rock band

- Origin: Huyton, Merseyside, England
- Genres: Alternative rock; Britpop
- Years active: 2000–2003
- Label: Hut/Virgin
- Past members: Wayne Whitfield; Karl Rowlands; Sean Longsworth; Joey Harrison

The Crescent were an English rock band, formed in 2000 in Huyton, Merseyside. The band comprised frontman Wayne Whitfield, guitarist Karl Rowlands, bassist Sean Longsworth and drummer Joey Harrison.

The band were noted as being "most famous for being protegees of lost La Lee Mavers".

== Career ==
Sean Longsworth and Joey Harrison were still in their teens when they formed The Crescent. They were soon joined by guitarist Karl Rowlands. The band rehearsed with fellow Huytonian Lee Mavers, formerly of The La's, but the collaborated stalled before gigging due to Mavers' erratic personality.

After singer-songwriter Wayne Whitfield joined the band, the band signed to Virgin Records sublabel Hut Records. Their debut single, "On The Run" made the Top 50 in the UK Singles Chart in May 2002. Two further singles followed, each reaching the UK chart, before their self-titled debut album was released in September 2002. They went on to tour across the UK, supporting other bands such as Toploader and The Bluetones.

Despite working on material for a second album, the band were dropped by Hut and split up in 2003, however there is more information about how they got dropped, Wayne said this on Twitter and/or X "There seemed to be some problems at Hut, the label itself dissolved not so long after…They kept the big names (or they moved somewhere else) But the rest were left in limbo." Whitfield now lives in Norway and has made a band known as JEEBUS, and Karl Rowlands fronts Liverpool band in By Ones.

== Discography ==
=== Albums ===
| Year | Information | UK Album Chart |
|---|---|---|
| 2002 | The Crescent: Debut studio album; Released: 30 September 2002; Formats: CD, LP; Track listing: 1. On the Run; 2. Streets of Tide; 3. Parallel; 4. Wake Up; 5. Test of Time; 6. Another Day; 7. Spinnin' Wheels; 8. Not Good Enough; 9. Told U So; 10. Stay On | No.146 |

=== Singles ===
| Year | Information | UK Singles Chart | Album |
|---|---|---|---|
| 2002 | "On the Run": Debut single; Released: 6 May 2002; Formats: CD, 7"; Track listing: 1. On the Run; 2. Mayday; 3. One Way Ticket | No.49 | The Crescent |
| 2002 | "Test of Time": Second single; Released: 15 July 2002; Formats: CD, 7"; Track listing: 1. Test of Time; 2. Open Question; 3. One to Another | No.60 | The Crescent |
| 2002 | "Spinnin' Wheels": Third single; Released: 16 September 2002; Formats: 2 x CD, 7"; Track listing: CD1; 1. Spinnin' Wheels; 2. Freedom, Peace and Liberty; 3. High Tide; CD2; 1. Spinnin' Wheels (BBC Evening Session); 2. Highly Unlikely; 3. One to Another | No.61 | The Crescent |
