= In Search of The La's: A Secret Liverpool =

- Author: M.W. Macefield
- Publisher: Helter Skelter
- Publication date: 11 December 2003
- Publication place: United Kingdom
- Media type: Print (Paperback)
- Pages: 192
- ISBN: 1-900924-63-3
- OCLC: 238641847

In Search of The La's: A Secret Liverpool is a biography about The La's written by M.W. Macefield, published in 2003 by Helter Skelter Publishing. The book gives a detailed history of the band with interviews from several ex-members and other persons related to the group. The author also discusses his own journey in tracking down each of the interviewees.

== Synopsis ==
"With the timeless single "There She Goes", Lee Mavers' La's overtook The Stone Roses as great British guitar hopes and paved the way for the Britpop renaissance of Blur and Oasis. However, since 1991, The La's have been silent, while rumors of studio-perfectionism, madness and drug addiction have abounded with Mavers lined up as another rock casualty. The author sets out to discover the truth behind Mavers' lost decade and eventually gains a revelatory audience with Mavers himself."

The author, MW Macefield, travels to Liverpool to interview several ex-members of the band (including co-founder Mike Badger, guitarist Paul Hemmings and bass player John Power), and sundry other personnel, and eventually gets to chat with the group's chief songwriter Lee Mavers. In it several La's myths are dispelled along the way, new song titles are named, and the past and future of the band is discussed.

== Release details ==
- United Kingdom (11 December 2003) Helter Skelter Publishing. Paperback edition (ISBN 1-900924-63-3)
- Revised edition 2012 ISBN 9781905139316 ISBN 1905139314

== See also ==
- The La's
- Lee Mavers
