= The La's (album) =

Studio album by the La's
- Released: 1 October 1990
- Recorded: 1987, July–September 1988, December 1989 – February 1990
- Studio: Woodcray, Wokingham; Eden, London
- Genre: Alternative rock; jangle pop; Britpop; skiffle; folk rock
- Length: 35:14
- Label: Polydor; Go!; London
- Producer: Steve Lillywhite, Bob Andrews

The La's chronology
The La's (1990)	Lost La's 1984–1986: Breakloose (1999)

Singles from The La's
- 1. "Way Out" Released: 2 November 1987; 2. "There She Goes" Released: 31 October 1988; 3. "Timeless Melody" Released: 3 September 1990; 4. "There She Goes" Released: 22 October 1990 (re-issue); 5. "Feelin'" Released: 4 February 1991

The La's is the only studio album by English rock band the La's, released on 1 October 1990 by Go! Discs. Four singles were released from the album; "Way Out" was originally released in November 1987, while "There She Goes" was released in 1988, and later became the band's biggest hit. "Timeless Melody" followed in September 1990, while "Feelin'" was released in February 1991 as the final single from the album. The former two were remixed for inclusion on The La's.

Due to its 1960s-influenced sound, reminiscent of the British Invasion era in contrast to many other alternative acts of the early 1990s, the album attracted substantial critical attention. The La's is widely considered to be a precursor to the Britpop phenomenon of the mid-1990s. In 2013, NME ranked The La's at number 154 on its list of the 500 greatest albums of all time. Despite only being a moderate hit in the UK at the time of its release, reaching No. 30 in the UK Album Charts, The La's would prove a major reference point for many later acts, most notably the Britpop icons Oasis as well as later indie bands such as Arctic Monkeys and Fontaines D.C.. A deluxe edition of The La's was released on 7 April 2008.

== Content ==
The La's was the subject of significant attention due to its unusual sound, which American music critic Stephen Thomas Erlewine describes as "the most beguiling" of albums that exists "outside of time or place, gently floating on their own style and sensibility", further adding that the album having a 1960s-esque sound without being "fussily retro" served as a precursor to the Britpop movement of the mid-1990s. The album's sound has been compared favourably with fellow Liverpool band the Beatles especially, as well as with other 1960s British bands such as the Kinks; Pitchfork wrote in 2017 that "the songs are pure Beatles melodicism [...] mixed with Kinks guitar riffs", whilst BBC Culture stated in 2021 that the album, drawing on the influence of the Beatles, Love, Pink Floyd and the Who, was at odds with prevailing scenes of 1990 such as Madchester, shoegaze and the then-upcoming grunge with its "acoustic melodies, 1960s sensibility and pure melodicism".

== Release and reception ==
Professional ratings
Review scores
Source	Rating
AllMusic	4.5/5 stars
Chicago Tribune	4/4 stars
Entertainment Weekly	A+
NME	8/10
The Observer	4/5 stars
Q	5/5 stars
The Rolling Stone Album Guide	4/5 stars
Select	4/5
Uncut	4/5 stars
The Village Voice	A−

The La's was released in 1990 on Go! Discs in the United Kingdom and in 1991 on London Records in the United States. The album was praised by critics and embraced by fans. It was the result of nearly three years in the studio with a string of acclaimed producers. Each attempted to capture the sound sought by Lee Mavers, the lead singer and principal songwriter of the band. However, due to Mavers' exacting expectations, the sound eluded each of the producers, and the album eventually released was immediately disowned by the band.

== Legacy ==
In 2013, NME ranked The La's at number 153 on its list of the 500 greatest albums of all time. In 2016, Rolling Stone placed the record at number 13 on its list of the "40 Greatest One-Album Wonders". The La's is included in the book 1001 Albums You Must Hear Before You Die.

=== Influence ===
The La's was described by Shaun Curran of BBC Culture in 2021 as "a masterpiece that shaped guitar music". The record's influence on the Britpop scene that would come to dominate the British mainstream in the mid-1990s is well-documented. Noel Gallagher of Oasis stated that the band's mission was "to finish what The La's started". Gallagher placed it at No. 4 on his 13 favourite albums list in 2011.

The album's songs have been covered by many later acts, including Pearl Jam, Sixpence None the Richer and Robbie Williams.

== Track listing ==
All tracks are written by Lee Mavers (except where stated).

No.	Title	Length
1.	"Son of a Gun"	1:55
2.	"I Can't Sleep"	2:37
3.	"Timeless Melody"	3:01
4.	"Liberty Ship"	2:31
5.	"There She Goes"	2:42
6.	"Doledrum"	2:50
7.	"Feelin'"	1:45
8.	"Way Out"	2:32
9.	"I.O.U."	2:13
10.	"Freedom Song"	2:23
11.	"Failure"	2:54
12.	"Looking Glass"	7:51
Total length:		35:14

Bonus tracks

Japan bonus tracks (1998)
No.	Title	Length
13.	"Knock Me Down"	3:17
14.	"Endless"	3:11
15.	"Come in Come Out"	2:14
16.	"Who Knows"	3:31
17.	"Man I'm Only Human"	4:34
18.	"All by Myself"	5:56
19.	"Clean Prophet"	1:49
20.	"There She Goes" (original single version)	2:35

UK remastered edition bonus tracks (2001)
No.	Title	Length
13.	"All by Myself"	5:53
14.	"Clean Prophet"	1:47
15.	"Knock Me Down"	3:15
16.	"Over" (live in a stable in Liverpool, Lee Mavers/John Power)	5:02
17.	"I.O.U." (alternative version)	2:08

The La's – Deluxe Edition (2008)

Disc 1 tracks 1–12 per original release

Disc 1: Bonus material
No.	Title	Length
13.	"Son of a Gun" (Gary Crowley, GLR Session Dec '88)	1:55
14.	"Doledrum" (Gary Crowley, GLR Session Dec '88)	3:00
15.	"I Can't Sleep" (Gary Crowley, GLR Session Dec '88)	2:34
16.	"Way Out" (Key 103, Jan '89)	2:42
17.	"I Am the Key" (Key 103, Jan '89)	3:05
18.	"That'll Be the Day" (BBC2 The Late Show Feb '89, Buddy Holly/Jerry Allison/Norman Petty)	2:07

Disc 2: Mike Hedges album
No.	Title	Length
1.	"I.O.U." (Mike Hedges version)	2:05
2.	"I Can't Sleep" (Mike Hedges version)	2:43
3.	"Knock Me Down" (Mike Hedges version)	2:56
4.	"Way Out" (Mike Hedges version)	2:47
5.	"Doledrum" (Mike Hedges version)	2:57
6.	"There She Goes" (Mike Hedges version)	2:49
7.	"Feelin'" (Mike Hedges version)	1:48
8.	"Timeless Melody" (Mike Hedges version)	3:07
9.	"Son of a Gun" (Mike Hedges version)	2:05
10.	"Clean Prophet" (Mike Hedges version)	2:09
11.	"Come in Come Out" (Mike Hedges version)	2:16
12.	"Failure" (Mike Hedges version)	3:08
13.	"Looking Glass" (Mike Hedges version)	7:28

Disc 2: Bonus material
No.	Title	Length
14.	"Doledrum" (John Porter mix)	2:53
15.	"Way Out" (Andy MacDonald mix)	2:39
16.	"There She Goes" (John Leckie mix)	2:44
17.	"Man I'm Only Human" (John Leckie mix)	5:00
18.	"Feelin'" (Bob Andrews mix)	1:53
19.	"Clean Prophet" (Bob Andrews mix)	2:02
20.	"I Can't Sleep" (Jeremy Allom mix)	2:41

== Personnel ==
The La's

- Lee Mavers – lead vocals and backing vocals, guitars
- John Power – basses and backing vocals
- Peter "Cammy" Camell – lead guitars
- Neil Mavers – drums and tambourine
- John "Boo" Byrne – electric guitar (on "There She Goes")
- Chris Sharrock – drums and tambourine (on "There She Goes")
- Paul Hemmings – electric guitar (on "Way Out")
- John "Timmo" Timson – drums, tambourine and bells (on "Way Out")

Production

- Steve Lillywhite – producer, mixing
- Mark Wallis – additional producer, engineer
- Donal Hodgson – engineer (on "Looking Glass")
- Bob Andrews – producer (on "There She Goes")
- Dave Charles – engineer (on "There She Goes")

Additional personnel

- Ryan Art – design

The La's: Deluxe Edition personnel

- Barry Sutton – guitar (disc one: tracks 13–18, disc two: tracks 1–13, 20)
- Chris Sharrock – drums (disc one: tracks 13–18, disc two: tracks 1–13, 18–20)
- Paul Hemmings – guitar (disc two: tracks 14–15)
- John "Timmo" Timson – drums (disc two: tracks 14–15)
- Peter "Cammy" Camell – guitar (disc two: tracks 16–17)
- Iain Templeton – drums (disc two: tracks 16–17)
- John "Boo" Byrne – guitar (disc two: tracks 18–19)

The La's: Deluxe Edition production personnel

- Mike Hedges – producer, remastering (disc two: tracks 1–13)
- Ian Grimble – engineer, mixing (disc two: tracks 1–13)
- Kevin Metcalfe – remastering (disc two: tracks 1–13)
- John Porter – producer (disc two: track 14)
- Kenny Jones – engineer (disc two: track 14)
- Gavin MacKillop – producer (disc two: track 15)
- Andy MacDonald – remixing (disc two: track 15)
- John Leckie – producer (disc two: tracks 16–17)
- Barry Hammond – engineer (disc two: tracks 16–17)
- Mike Shepherd – engineer (disc two: tracks 16–17)
- Bob Andrews – producer (disc two: tracks 18–19)
- Dave Charles – engineer (disc two: tracks 18–19)
- Jeremy Allom – producer (disc two: track 20)
- Mike Haas – engineer (disc two: track 20)

== Charts ==
Chart (1990–1991)	Peak position
UK Albums Chart	30
US Billboard 200	196
