= Way Out =

Way Out may refer to:

- "Way Out" (360 song), featuring Teischa, 2017
- "Way Out" (Jack Harlow song), 2020
- "Way Out" (Roxette song), 2011
- "Way Out" (The La's song), 1987
- Way Out (film), a 1967 film directed by Irvin Yeaworth
- 'Way Out, a 1961 fantasy and science fiction television anthology series hosted by writer Roald Dahl
- Way Out!, a 1958 album by Johnny Griffin
- "Way Out", a 2022 song by Dear Seattle
- "Way Out", a 2026 song by Stray Kids from This & That
- Wayout, a 1982 3D video game

== See also ==
- Exit (disambiguation)
