= The Icicle Works =

English alternative rock band

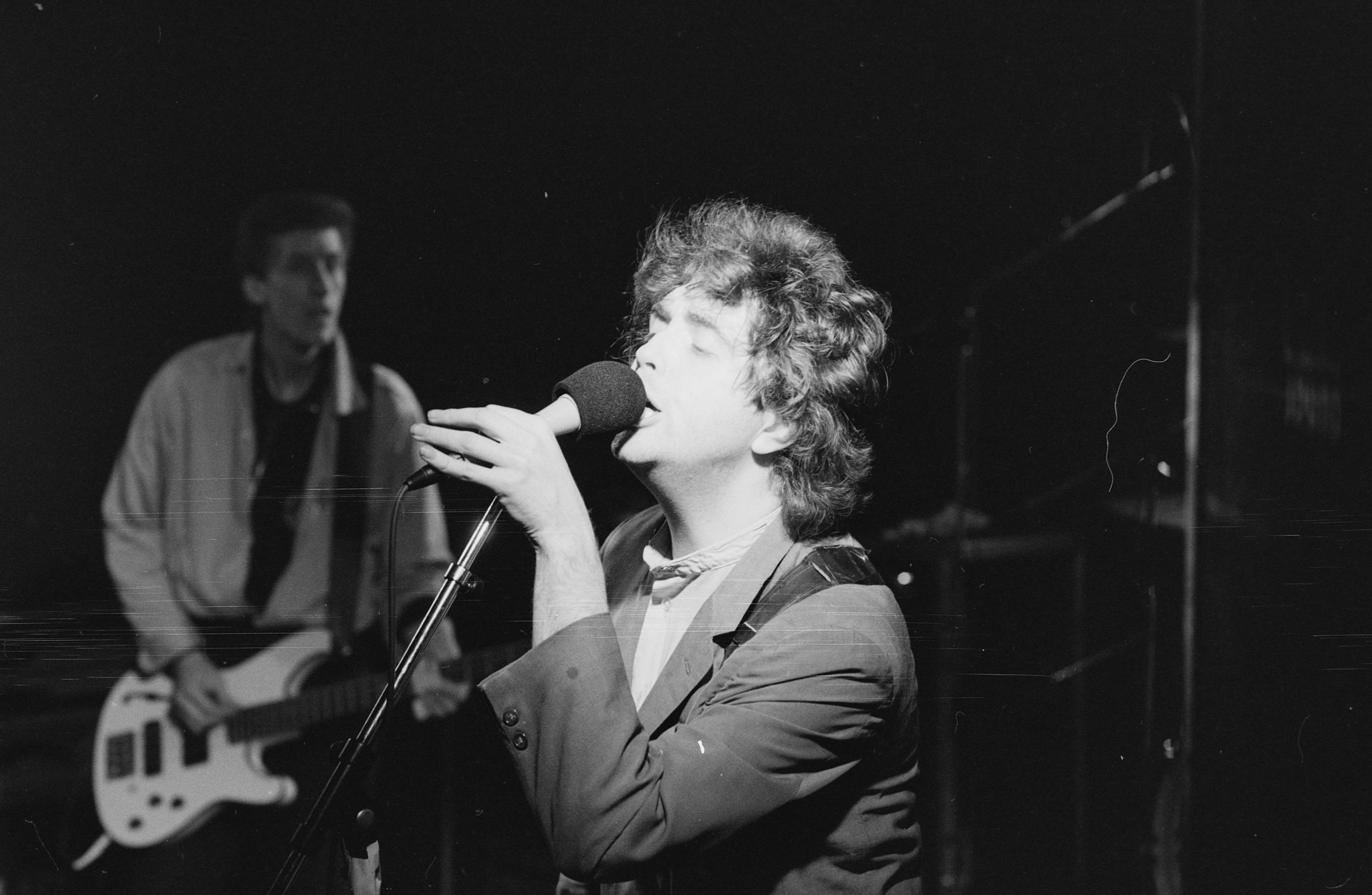
- Chris Layhe and Ian McNabb performing with The Icicle Works in 1987

Background information
- Origin: Liverpool, England
- Genres: New wave; post-punk; alternative rock; psychedelic rock
- Years active: 1980–1991; 2006–present
- Labels: Situation Two; Beggars Banquet; Arista; Epic
- Members: Ian McNabb; Richard Naiff; Nick Kilroe
- Past members: Chris Layhe; Chris Sharrock; Zak Starkey; Dave Green; Dave Baldwin; Jed Lynch; Mark Revell; Paul Burgess; Roy Corkill; Matthew Preist; Mark Brzezicki; Jack Hymers

The Icicle Works (also known as Icicle Works in the United States) are an English alternative rock band, named after the 1960 short story "The Day the Icicle Works Closed" by science fiction author Frederik Pohl. They had a Top 20 UK hit with "Love Is a Wonderful Colour" (1983). In the US and Canada, they had one Top 40 hit, the 1984 single "Birds Fly (Whisper to a Scream)".

Consisting of singer/guitarist/keyboardist/songwriter Ian McNabb, drummer Chris Sharrock, and bassist Chris Layhe, the band released four albums from 1984 to 1988. The original band broke up in 1989, but McNabb has continued to perform under the Icicle Works name with various replacement members.

== History ==
=== 1980–1983: Formation and early years ===
The band was founded in Liverpool in 1980 when bassist Chris Layhe answered an advertisement for a musical collaborator placed by 20-year-old Ian McNabb. The two got together and started writing. They added drummer Chris Sharrock, and began playing live shows as the Icicle Works.

In 1981, the band recorded a six-song independently released cassette entitled Ascending. In 1982, they released the independent single "Nirvana", which made it to No. 15 on the UK Indie Chart. The following year, the Icicle Works were signed to the Beggars Banquet label, who issued the single "Birds Fly (Whisper to a Scream)" on their subsidiary label Situation Two.

Later that year, the Icicle Works released their biggest UK hit, 1983's "Love Is a Wonderful Colour". Their 1984 debut album followed shortly thereafter, reached number 24 on the UK Albums Chart and entered the US top 40. Appearing on the US Top 40 singles chart at around the same time (and hitting higher in Canada) was "Whisper to a Scream (Birds Fly)", a retitled and slightly remixed version of the band's Situation Two release of 1983.

=== 1984–1988: Touring years ===
The Icicle Works struggled to match their initial commercial success. They continued to receive critical acclaim as a live band and secured a loyal fan base both in the UK and abroad.

In September 1984, the band issued the UK-only single "Hollow Horse", which flopped. A series of follow-up singles similarly missed the charts, including the Motown-flavoured "All The Daughters" and the folk-rock inspired "Seven Horses". Added to the live line-up around this time was keyboardist Chris "Tugsie" Turrill.

The band's second LP, The Small Price of a Bicycle came out in mid-1985 in the UK.

Beginning in 1986, keyboardist Dave Green replaced Turrill at live shows, and contributed to the band's recordings.

In the early 1986, Beggars' Banquet compiled all the 12-inch mixes of the band's singles onto a UK-only LP entitled Seven Singles Deep, which hit No. 52 on the UK Albums Chart.

In July 1986, the Icicle Works had a UK chart hit with "Understanding Jane", which peaked at No. 52. The pop-oriented follow-up single "Who Do You Want For Your Love" peaked at No. 54, and January 1987's "Evangeline" peaked at No. 53. All three songs found their way on to the 1987 album If You Want to Defeat Your Enemy Sing His Song, produced by Ian Broudie. The album was released in both Britain and North America and hit No. 28 on the UK Albums Chart.

Later in 1987, the Icicle Works issued the single "High Time". It peaked at No. 76 in the UK, but in 1988 it hit No. 13 on the newly created US Modern Rock chart.

The band's fourth album, Blind, was produced by McNabb and issued in 1988, and reached the Top 40 of the album chart. The album featured 13 tracks in the UK and Canada, but the US version of the album featured a different track listing, slightly edited versions of a few songs, and a different cover. Still, both versions of the album contained "High Time" and the minor British hit "Little Girl Lost", which peaked at No. 59.

=== 1989–1991: New line-up and split ===
Shortly after Blind was issued, drummer Chris Sharrock departed to the La's. Layhe also departed at this time. Beggars Banquet subsequently dropped the group from their roster.

McNabb continued to perform under the name the Icicle Works for a while. Green was promoted to official membership status, although he left the band within a year. Zak Starkey was added on drums for a time, and various keyboardists, bassists, and guitarists passed through before the band released their final album Permanent Damage (1990), recorded for Epic/Sony. By that time, the band's line-up was McNabb, bassist Roy Corkill, former 10cc and Jethro Tull drummer Paul Burgess, keyboardist Dave Baldwin, and backing vocalist Mark Revell.

"The reason Permanent Damage was an Icicle Works album was because Muff Winwood, who signed me to Epic, wanted a brand name that he knew was dependable, and wasn’t very keen on me just becoming Ian McNabb. But it was effectively a solo album." —Ian McNabb/

This 'second-generation' version of the Icicle Works broke up after Permanent Damage failed to chart, and Epic dropped the band. McNabb's solo career officially began in 1991 with the release of the single "Great Dreams of Heaven".

In 1992, a compilation called The Best of The Icicle Works was released by Beggars Banquet. Two years later, a live recording of a 1987 concert was issued.

=== 2006–present: Revival ===
After having been a solo act for 15 years, in 2006 McNabb reactivated the Icicle Works name for a series of six UK concerts in October. This version of the band consisted of McNabb, bassist Roy Corkill, and two new members: keyboard player Richard Naiff and drummer Mathew Priest, both of McNabb's long-time solo touring band.

The Icicle Works appeared at GuilFest 2007 and played a nine-date UK tour in December 2007. McNabb and company played two free shows as the Icicle Works in Liverpool in January 2008.

McNabb continued to play gigs as a solo artist throughout 2009 and 2010. After a three-year hiatus from performing, the Icicle Works played a series of 30th Anniversary gigs in 2011.

Chris Layhe rejoined the band for a series of acoustic shows in 2024 on bass and backing vocals. The lineup consisted solely of McNabb and Layhe for these shows.

Roy Corkill died in August 2024 after a long illness.

For a series of North American dates in 2025, the group consisted of McNabb, drummer Mark Brzezicki and keyboardist Jack Hymers. Later that same year, the band played several UK dates with a line-up of Ian McNabb, Richard Naiff and drummer Nick Kilroe.

== Band members ==
Current

- Ian McNabb – guitar, lead vocals, keyboards (1980–1990, 2006–present)
- Chris Layhe – bass, backing vocals (1980–1988, 2024–present)
- Richard Naiff – keyboards (2006–2022, 2025–present)
- Nick Kilroe – drums (2017–2022, 2025–present)

Former

- Chris Sharrock – drums (1981–1988)
- Zak Starkey – drums (1988)
- Dave Green – keyboards (1986–1988)
- Dave Baldwin – keyboards (1989–1990)
- Ged Lynch – drums (1989)
- Mark Revell – backing vocals (1990)
- Paul Burgess – drums (1990)
- Roy Corkill – bass (1988–1990, 2006–2022; died 2024)
- Mathew Priest – drums (2006–2017)
- Mark Brzezicki – drums (2025 North American tour)
- Jack Hymers – keyboards (2025 North American tour)

== Discography ==
- The Icicle Works (1984)
- The Small Price of a Bicycle (1985)
- If You Want to Defeat Your Enemy Sing His Song (1987)
- Blind (1988)
- Permanent Damage (1990)

== Sources ==
- Whitburn, Joel (1987). The Billboard Book of Top 40 Albums. New York: Billboard Publications, Inc. ISBN 0-8230-7513-3
- Whitburn, Joel (1987). The Billboard Book of Top 40 Hits (3rd ed.). New York: Billboard Publications, Inc. ISBN 0-8230-7520-6
- Official Discography at the Ian McNabb web page
- Barwood, Tony. Liner notes to "The Icicle Works" (2006 reissue).
