= Birds Fly (Whisper to a Scream) =

Single by The Icicle Works

from the album The Icicle Works
- B-side: "In the Cauldron of Love"
- Released: 10 June 1983; 2 March 1984 (re-issue)
- Recorded: 1983
- Genre: New wave
- Length: 3:45
- Label: Beggars Banquet
- Songwriter: Ian McNabb
- Producer: Hugh Jones

The Icicle Works singles chronology
"Nirvana" (1982)	"Birds Fly (Whisper to a Scream)" (1983)	"Love Is a Wonderful Colour" (1983)

"Birds Fly (Whisper to a Scream)", given the reversed title "Whisper to a Scream (Birds Fly)" in some markets, is a song by the British band the Icicle Works. It was released in 1983 as the first single from the band's 1984 debut eponymous album The Icicle Works, and re-released in March 1984. The song was written by Ian McNabb, the band's lead singer, and produced by Hugh Jones.

== UK releases ==
The recording was initially released as a single in the UK in June 1983 as "Birds Fly (Whisper to a Scream)" on the Situation Two label. This initial release hit No. 2 on the UK Independent Chart, and scraped the lower reaches of the UK Singles Chart at number 89.

After the Icicle Works' next UK single "Love Is a Wonderful Colour" hit number 15 on the UK charts in late 1983 and early 1984, Beggars Banquet Records re-released "Birds Fly (Whisper to a Scream)" in March 1984 with a new cover and B-side. This release climbed to number 52 in the UK. John Peel was an early advocate of the single and played both the A and B-side on his show during June and July 1983.

== American release ==
The group's American label Arista Records refused to release the record unless some changes were made. The track was remixed slightly in order to remove a brief spoken-word overdub in the opening bars of music (the woman performing this intro was identified only as "Mariella" on the original Situation Two single sleeve). Also, the song title was reversed, becoming "Whisper to a Scream (Birds Fly)" and Arista shortened the band's name to Icicle Works. With these changes, the song reached number 37 on the US Billboard Hot 100 chart, and number 34 on Cashbox's singles chart in the summer of 1984. The song also reached number 18 on the Billboard Mainstream Rock chart, number 13 on Billboard's Dance chart and number 15 on the Radio & Records AOR chart.

== Canadian release ==
The Canadian version of the single (credited to The Icicle Works) used the original UK mix with the spoken-word intro, but under the revised American title "Whisper to a Scream (Birds Fly)". This was the most successful commercial release of the single, reaching number 19 on the Canadian chart in the summer of 1984.

== Track listings ==
=== 1983 release ===
7" vinyl

1. "Birds Fly (Whisper to a Scream)" (3:46)
2. "Reverie Girl" (3:54)

12" vinyl

1. "Birds Fly (Whisper to a Scream)" (3:52)
2. "Reverie Girl" (3:55)
3. "Gunboys" (3:44)

=== 1984 release ===
7" vinyl (UK)

1. "Birds Fly (Whisper to a Scream)" (3:48)
2. "In the Cauldron of Love" (3:50)

7" vinyl (Canada)

1. "Birds Fly (Whisper to a Scream)" (3:48)
2. "Scarecrow" (3:06)

12" vinyl (BEG 108T)

1. "Birds Fly (Whisper to a Scream)" (3:48)
2. "In the Cauldron of Love" (3:50)
3. "Scarecrow" (3:06)
4. "Ragweed Campaign" (4:12)

12" vinyl (BEG 108TD)

1. "Birds Fly (Whisper to a Scream)" (3:48)
2. "In the Cauldron of Love" (3:50)
3. "Birds Fly" (Frantic mix) (5.20)

12" vinyl (BEG 108TR)

1. "Birds Fly" (Frantic mix) (5:20)
2. "Birds Fly (Whisper to a Scream)" (3:48)
3. "In the Cauldron of Love" (3:50)
4. "Scarecrow" (3:06)
5. "Ragweed Campaign" (4:10)

== Charts ==
Chart performance for "Birds Fly (Whisper to a Scream)"
Chart (1983–1984)	Peak position
Canada Top Singles (RPM)	19
UK Singles (Official Charts)	53
US Billboard Hot 100	37
US Dance Club Songs (Billboard)	13

== Personnel ==
- Ian McNabb - vocals, guitar, keyboards
- Chris Layhe - bass, backing vocals
- Chris Sharrock - drums, percussion
- Mariella - spoken word intro (edited out of US single version)

== Cover versions ==
English musical trio Soho recorded a version for the soundtrack of Wes Craven's film Scream (1996).
