= The Small Price of a Bicycle =

Studio album by The Icicle Works
- Released: September 1985
- Recorded: 1984–1985
- Genre: Post-punk, new wave, neo-psychedelia
- Length: 44:45
- Label: Beggars Banquet
- Producer: Hugh Jones; Wally Brill; The Icicle Works; Geoff Muir

The Icicle Works chronology
The Icicle Works (1984)	The Small Price of a Bicycle (1985)	If You Want to Defeat Your Enemy Sing His Song (1987)

Singles from The Small Price of a Bicycle
- 1. "Hollow Horse" Released: 5 October 1984; 2. "All the Daughters" Released: 10 May 1985; 3. "Seven Horses" Released: 5 July 1985

The Small Price of a Bicycle is the second studio album by The Icicle Works. The album was released in 1985 and charted at number 55 in the UK Despite the success of the band's first album in North America, it was not released in either the US or Canada, with Arista Records in the US memorably rejecting it as "punk-rock demos".

In Canada, an early version of the track "Book of Reason" was released by Vertigo Records on their 1984 Vertigo Sampler 2-LP set, with a note that the track was from the forthcoming Icicle Works LP. However, the LP never actually appeared; instead, Vertigo Canada issued a 5-track EP called Seven Horses Deep. This EP included the so-called "American Version" of "Seven Horses" (which was never actually issued in the US), the single version of "All The Daughters", and the previously issued UK b-sides "(Let's Go) Down to the River", "Beggars Legacy" and "Goin' Back".

In 2011, Cherry Red Records issued a 3-CD expanded edition of The Small Price of a Bicycle. Disc 1 featured the original album in its entirety, while discs 2 and 3 featured a wealth of related demos, b-sides, radio sessions, live tracks, remixes and unreleased session outtakes.

== Critical reception ==
Professional ratings
Review scores
Source	Rating
AllMusic	3/5 stars
Sounds	5/5 stars

The album was reviewed by Roger Holland for the music magazine Sounds where it received a perfect score of five stars out of five. Holland wrote that The Small Price of a Bicycle was "a very fine album" and praised its "combinations of exuberant young rock rhythms and enchanting, inspiring vocals".

== Track listing ==
=== UK edition ===
Original LP & CD
No.	Title	Writer(s)	Producer(s)	Length
1.	"Hollow Horse"	Ian McNabb; Chris Layhe	Hugh Jones	4:00
2.	"Perambulator"	McNabb; Layhe	Wally Brill	4:02
3.	"Seven Horses"	McNabb	Brill	4:12
4.	"Rapids"	McNabb	Brill	4:32
5.	"Windfall"	McNabb	Brill	4:13
6.	"Assumed Sundown"	McNabb	Brill	5:53
7.	"Saint's Sojourn"	McNabb	Brill	4:43
8.	"All The Daughters (Of Her Father's House)"	McNabb	Geoff Muir; The Icicle Works	4:40
9.	"Book of Reason"	McNabb	Brill	3:45
10.	"Conscience of Kings"	McNabb	Brill	4:48

=== 2011 Expanded Edition ===
Disc 1 contains the original album, as above

2011 Expanded Edition (Disc 2)
No.	Title	Writer(s)	Producer(s)	Length
1.	"Hollow Horse" (Long Version)	McNabb; Layhe	Hugh Jones	5.04
2.	"Book of Reason" (USA Long Version)	McNabb	Wally Brill	4.37
3.	"All The Daughters (Of Her Father's House)" (Long Version)	McNabb	Geoff Muir; The Icicle Works	6.32
4.	"A Pocketful of Nothing"	McNabb	The Icicle Works; Pete Coleman	3.56
5.	"Mr. Soul"	Neil Young	The Icicle Works; Coleman	3.17
6.	"When You Hear The Mission Bells"	McNabb		4.01
7.	"Seven Horses" (American Version)	McNabb	Brill	4.49
8.	"Slingshot"	McNabb; Layhe	Brill	4.23
9.	"Beggars Legacy"	McNabb; Layhe	Brill	3.48
10.	"Goin' Back"	Carole King; Gerry Goffin	Brill	3.57
11.	"When It All Comes Down" (Long Version)	McNabb	Pat Moran	6.34
12.	"(Let's Go) Down to the River"	McNabb	Muir; Ian McNabb	4.01
13.	"Cold Turkey"	John Lennon	Muir; McNabb	4.31
14.	"Seven Horses" (Early Recording)	McNabb		4.51
15.	"Perambulator" (Early Recording)	McNabb		4.03
16.	"Assumed Sundown" (Early Recording)	McNabb		5.28
17.	"Beggars Legacy" (Early Recording)	McNabb; Layhe		3.37

2011 Expanded Edition (Disc 3)
No.	Title	Length
1.	"When It All Comes Down" (Abridged Version)
2.	"Saints Sojourn" (Early Recording)
3.	"Hollow Horse" (John Peel Session 1984)
4.	"Deep in the Woods" (John Peel Session 1984)
5.	"Conscience of Kings" (John Peel Session 1984)
6.	"When You Hear the Mission Bells" (John Peel Session 1984)
7.	"Perambulator" (Janice Long Session 1985)
8.	"All the Daughters (Of Her Father's House)" (Janice Long Session 1985)
9.	"Diamond in the Rough" (Janice Long Session 1985)
10.	"Impossibly Three Lovers" (Janice Long Session 1985)
11.	"Seven Horses" (Live)
12.	"Perambulator" (Live)
13.	"Rapids" (Live)
14.	"Hollow Horse" (Live)
15.	"You Ain't Seen Nothing Yet" (Live)

== Personnel ==
The Icicle Works

- Robert Ian McNabb – guitar, lead vocals, keyboards
- Chris Layhe – bass, backing vocals, keyboards, violin
- Chris Sharrock – drums, percussion
