= The Icicle Works (album) =

Studio album by The Icicle Works
- Released: 23 March 1984
- Recorded: 1983–1984
- Genre: New wave
- Length: 42:35
- Label: Beggars Banquet
- Producers: Hugh Jones; David Lord

The Icicle Works chronology
The Icicle Works (1984)	The Small Price of a Bicycle (1985)

Alternate cover
- American version

Singles from The Icicle Works
- 1. "Birds Fly (Whisper to a Scream)" Released: June 1983; 2. "Love Is a Wonderful Colour" Released: October 1983; 3. "Birds Fly (Whisper to a Scream)" Released: March 1984 (re-release)

The Icicle Works (titled Icicle Works in the United States) is the debut album by the Icicle Works. The album was released in 1984 and charted at number 24 in the UK and number 40 in the US.

The original 1984 issue features different track listings and cover artwork in the UK, in the US, and in Canada. The US version of the album has a remixed and re-titled version of "Birds Fly (Whisper to a Scream)". The US remix does not include the female spoken introduction heard on the UK mix. The US album was released by Arista Records.

In 2006, Beggars Banquet Records issued both a 2-CD and a limited edition 3-CD expanded edition of The Icicle Works. Disc 1 consists of the original album in its entirety, in the UK configuration. Disc 2 features a selection of b-sides, radio sessions, and remixes, as well as one live track. On the 3-CD edition, the first 10 tracks of disc 3 consist of "radio session" versions of the songs from the original UK Icicle Works album; they are presented in the original UK album sequence. Disc 3 then concludes with a previously released b-side, and a previously unreleased album outtake.

== Reception ==
Professional ratings
Review scores
Source	Rating
AllMusic	4.5/5 stars
Rolling Stone	3/5 stars
The Village Voice	C+

Pitchfork Media described the song "Love Is a Wonderful Colour" as "one of those 'wow where was this hiding?' tracks that make you think there's something left to 80s crate-digging."

== Track listing ==
All songs on UK, US and Canadian editions written by Ian McNabb.

=== UK edition ===
1. "Chop the Tree" – 4:42
2. "Love Is a Wonderful Colour" – 4:13
3. "Reaping the Rich Harvest" – 4:06
4. "As the Dragonfly Flies" – 3:58
5. "Lovers' Day" – 4:49
6. "In the Cauldron of Love" – 3:50
7. "Out of Season" – 4:46
8. "A Factory in the Desert" – 3:11
9. "Birds Fly (Whisper to a Scream)" – 3:48
10. "Nirvana" – 5:07

=== US edition ===
In addition to using the remix version of "Whisper to a Scream (Birds Fly)", the US album dropped the track "Reaping the Rich Harvest" and added the track "Waterline" (USA version).

US Edition
No.	Title	Length
1.	"Whisper to a Scream (Birds Fly)"
2.	"In the Cauldron of Love"
3.	"Nirvana"
4.	"Lover's Day"
5.	"A Factory in the Desert"
6.	"Waterline"
7.	"Chop the Tree"
8.	"Out of Season"
9.	"As the Dragonfly Flies"
10.	"Love Is a Wonderful Colour"

=== Canadian edition ===
Compared to the UK version, the Canadian edition dropped the track "As the Dragonfly Flies", and added the track "Waterline" (UK single version). It also lists the song "Reap the Rich Harvest", where other editions listed it as "Reaping the Rich Harvest".

Canadian Edition
No.	Title	Length
1.	"Lover's Day"
2.	"Love Is a Wonderful Colour"
3.	"Reap the Rich Harvest"
4.	"Chop the Tree"
5.	"A Factory in the Desert"
6.	"In the Cauldron of Love"
7.	"Whisper to a Scream (Birds Fly)"
8.	"Waterline"
9.	"Out of Season"
10.	"Nirvana"

=== 2006 expanded edition ===
Disc 1 of the expanded edition is identical to the original UK version of the album.

2006 Expanded Edition (Disc 2 - B-sides, Mixes & Rarities)
No.	Title	Length
1.	"All Is Right" (Session)
2.	"When Winter Lasted Forever" (Session)
3.	"Love Hunt" (Session)
4.	"Reverie Girl"
5.	"Gun Boys"
6.	"Love Is a Wonderful Colour" (Long Version)
7.	"Waterline" (USA Version)
8.	"In the Dance the Shamen Led"
9.	"The Devil on Horseback"
10.	"Mountain Comes to Mohammed" (Session)
11.	"Birds Fly (Whisper to a Scream)" (Frantic Mix)
12.	"Scarecrow"
13.	"Ragweed Campaign"
14.	"The Atheist"
15.	"Nirvana" (Live)

2006 Expanded Edition (Disc 3 - Bonus Disc)
No.	Title	Length
1.	"Chop the Tree" (Jensen Session)
2.	"Love Is a Wonderful Colour" (Peel Session)
3.	"Reaping the Rich Harvest" (Peel Session)
4.	"As the Dragonfly Flies" (Jensen Session)
5.	"Lover's Day" (Jensen Session)
6.	"In the Cauldron of Love" (Peel Session)
7.	"Out of Season" (Jensen Session)
8.	"A Factory in the Desert" (Peel Session)
9.	"Birds Fly (Whisper to a Scream)" (Jensen Session)
10.	"Nirvana" (Jensen Session)
11.	"Waterline" (UK Single Version)
12.	"Love Hunt" (Unreleased Hugh Jones Version)

== Personnel ==
- Ian McNabb – lead vocals, guitar, keyboards
- Chris Layhe – bass, backing vocals
- Chris Sharrock – drums, percussion
