= If You Want to Defeat Your Enemy Sing His Song =

Studio album by The Icicle Works
- Released: March 1987
- Genre: Post-punk, new wave, neo-psychedelia
- Length: 39:02 (LP); 59:25 (CD)
- Label: Beggars Banquet (U.K.); RCA Records (U.S.)
- Producer: Ian Broudie

The Icicle Works chronology
| The Small Price of a Bicycle (1985) | If You Want to Defeat Your Enemy Sing His Song (1987) | Blind (1988) |

Singles from If You Want to Defeat Your Enemy Sing His Song
- 1. "Understanding Jane" Released: 1986; 2. "Who Do You Want for Your Love?" Released: 1986; 3. "Up Here in the North of England" Released: 1986 (12" single only); 4. "Evangeline" Released: 1987; 5. "Travelling Chest" Released: 1987 (European-only release)

Professional ratings
Review scores
| Source | Rating |
|---|---|
| AllMusic | 3/5 stars |

If You Want to Defeat Your Enemy Sing His Song is the third album by The Icicle Works. The album was released in 1987.

In 2011, Cherry Red Records issued a 3-CD expanded edition of If You Want to Defeat Your Enemy Sing His Song. Disc 1 featured the original album in its entirety, disc 2 featured a wealth of related demos, b-sides, and remixes, and disc 3 featured a complete live concert entitled Live at the Town And Country Club, 1986.

== Track listing ==
=== Original release ===
LP version
All songs written by Ian McNabb.

1. "Hope Springs Eternal" – 4:06
2. "Travelling Chest" – 4:40
3. "Sweet Thursday" – 4:17
4. "Up Here in the North of England" – 5:12
5. "Who Do You Want for Your Love?" – 3:54
6. "When You Were Mine" – 4:37
7. "Evangeline" – 4:05
8. "Truck Driver's Lament" – 5:18
9. "Understanding Jane" – 3:21
10. "Walking With a Mountain" – 4:44

CD version
The original CD version contained four bonus tracks: "Everybody Loves to Play the Fool", "I Never Saw My Hometown 'Til I Went Around the World", "Into the Mystic" and "Don't Let It Rain on My Parade".

All songs written by Ian McNabb, except "Into the Mystic" written by Van Morrison.

1. "Hope Springs Eternal" – 4:06
2. "Travelling Chest" – 4:40
3. "Sweet Thursday" – 4:17
4. "Up Here in the North of England" – 5:12
5. "Who Do You Want for Your Love?" – 3:54
6. "Everybody Loves to Play the Fool" – 4:08
7. "When You Were Mine" – 4:37
8. "Don't Let It Rain on My Parade" – 4:35
9. "Evangeline" – 4:05
10. "Truck Driver's Lament" – 5:18
11. "Understanding Jane" – 3:21
12. "I Never Saw My Hometown 'Til I Went Around the World" – 2:48
13. "Walking With a Mountain" – 4:44
14. "Into the Mystic" – 3:40

=== 2011 expanded edition ===
Disc 1 follows the same track listing as the 10-track LP version of this album.

2011 expanded edition disc two
| No. | Title | Writer(s) | Length |
|---|---|---|---|
| 1. | "I Never Saw My Hometown 'Til I Went Around the World" | Ian McNabb |
| 2. | "Into the Mystic" | Van Morrison |
| 3. | "Sweet Thursday (extended single mix)" | McNabb |
| 4. | "Don't Let It Rain on My Parade (full version)" | McNabb |
| 5. | "When You Were Mine (single version)" | McNabb |
| 6. | "Evangeline (demo version)" | McNabb |
| 7. | "Everybody Loves to Play the Fool" | McNabb |
| 8. | "Waiting in the Wings" | Chris Layhe |
| 9. | "It Makes No Difference" | Robbie Robertson |
| 10. | "Sea Song" | Robert Wyatt |
| 11. | "Nature's Way" | Randy California |
| 12. | "Waylaid" | Layhe |
| 13. | "The Needle and the Damage Done" | Neil Young |
| 14. | "Sweet Thursday (acoustic)" | McNabb |
| 15. | "Don't Let It Rain on my Parade (single version)" | McNabb |
| 16. | "Impossibly Three Lovers" | McNabb |
| 17. | "John Geoffrey Muir, Shopkeeper" | McNabb, Layhe, Chris Sharrock |

Live at the Town and Country Club, 1986 disc three
| No. | Title | Writer(s) | Length |
|---|---|---|---|
| 1. | "Hollow Horse" | Ian McNabb, Chris Layhe |
| 2. | "Perambulator" | McNabb, Layhe |
| 3. | "Who Do You Want for Your Love?" | McNabb |
| 4. | "Understanding Jane" | McNabb |
| 5. | "Love Is a Wonderful Colour" | McNabb |
| 6. | "Travelling Chest" | McNabb |
| 7. | "Sweet Thursday" | McNabb |
| 8. | "Into the Mystic" | Van Morrison |
| 9. | "Hope Springs Eternal" | McNabb |
| 10. | "When It All Comes Down" | McNabb |
| 11. | "All the Daughters (Of Her Father's House)" | McNabb |
| 12. | "Birds Fly (Whisper to a Scream)" | McNabb |
| 13. | "A Factory in the Desert" | McNabb |
| 14. | "In the Cauldron of Love" | McNabb |
| 15. | "Should I Stay or Should I Go" | Joe Strummer, Mick Jones |
| 16. | "Roadhouse Blues" | The Doors |

== Personnel ==
- Robert Ian "Boots" McNabb – guitar, vocals, keyboards, harmonica
- Chris Layhe – bass, vocals, keyboards
- Chris Sharrock – drums, percussion

with:

- Dave Green – keyboards
- Mike Timmoney – keyboards
- Ritchie Close – keyboards
- Ian Broudie – keyboards; guitar solo on "When You Were Mine"
- Alison Limerick – backing vocal on "Evangeline"
