= Permanent Damage =

Studio album by The Icicle Works
- Released: May 1990
- Studios: Amazon, Livingstone, Mayfair and Air Studios, London
- Genres: Post-punk, new wave, neo-psychedelia
- Length: 46:56
- Label: Epic
- Producers: The Icicle Works, Michael H. Brauer (tracks 1 to 5), Richard Manwaring (track 6)

The Icicle Works chronology
Blind (1988)	Permanent Damage (1990)

Professional ratings
Review scores
Source	Rating
AllMusic	2.5/5 stars
Classic Rock	9/10 stars
The Encyclopedia of Popular Music	3/5 stars
MusicHound Rock: The Essential Album Guide	0/5 stars

Permanent Damage is the fifth and final album by the Icicle Works. The album was released in 1990.

== Critical reception ==
The Quietus called the album a collection of "more straightforward classic rock songs ... an unimaginative set." The Rough Guide to Rock called it a "somewhat desperate set redeemed by the excellent single 'Motorcycle Rider.'" MusicHound Rock: The Essential Album Guide wrote that it tended "to be uninspired and samey."

== Track listing ==
All songs written by Ian McNabb.

=== Original 1990 album ===
1. "I Still Want You" – 3:35
2. "Motorcycle Rider" – 3:35
3. "Melanie Still Hurts" – 4:13
4. "Hope Street Rag" – 3:28
5. "I Think I'm Gonna Be OK" – 3:11
6. "Baby Don't Burn" – 4:07
7. "What She Did to My Mind" – 7:18
8. "One Good Eye" – 4:47
9. "Permanent Damage" – 3:17
10. "Woman on My Mind" – 3:41
11. "Looks Like Rain" – 2:12
12. "Dumb Angel" – 3:32

=== Bonus disc on 2006 reissue ===
1. "Turn Any Corner" – 3:06
2. "Let's Get Loaded" – 2:11
3. "Red Lightning" – 2:44
4. "People Change" – 2:37
5. "Victoria's Ghost" – 2:38
6. "When The Crying's Done" – 2:45
7. "Mickey's Blue" – 3:04
8. "I Dreamt I Was A Beautiful Woman" – 2:27
9. "I Want That Girl" – 3:21
10. "Wouldn't It Be Great" – 2:51
11. "Sweet Disposition" – 3:42
12. "It's Not Gonna Rain Forever" – 3:06

== Personnel ==
The Icicle Works

- Robert Ian McNabb – vocals, guitars, keyboards
- Roy Corkhill – bass
- Paul Burgess – drums

Additional musicians

- Dave Baldwin – additional keyboards
- Mark Revell – backing vocals
- Ged Lynch – additional drums and percussion
- Louis Gardin – percussion

Production

- Michael H. Brauer – co-producer on tracks 1–5, mixing on tracks 1–5, 7, 8, 10, 12
- Richard Manwaring – co-producer, engineer and mixing on track 6
- Mark Phythian – mixing on tracks 9 and 11
