= Timeless Melody =

1990 song

Single by the La's

from the album The La's
- B-side: "Clean Prophet"; "Over"
- Released: 3 September 1990
- Recorded: 1989–1990
- Studio: Eden Studios, London
- Genre: Pop; alternative rock
- Length: 3:01
- Label: Go! Discs (GOLAS 4)
- Songwriter: L.A. Mavers
- Producer: Steve Lillywhite

The La's singles chronology
"There She Goes" (1988)	"Timeless Melody" (1990)	"There She Goes" (1990)

Music video
- "Timeless Melody" on YouTube

"Timeless Melody" is a rock song written by Liverpool singer/guitarist Lee Mavers and recorded by Mavers' band The La's.

== Music video ==
The music video contains footage from live shows (parts of which are slowed down), depictions of Egyptian hieroglyphs, a short animated sequence, and clips shot at a studio. The video ends with a view of the night sky with stars forming the name of the band.

== Formats and track listings ==
- All songs written by L.A. Mavers (except where stated).

7" single (GOLAS 4)
Cassette single (LASMC 4)

1. "Timeless Melody" – 3:03
2. "Clean Prophet" – 1:48

12" single (GOLAS 412)
CD single (LASCD 4)

1. "Timeless Melody" – 3:03
2. "Clean Prophet" – 1:48
3. "Knock Me Down" – 3:16
4. "Over" – 5:01 (Mavers/Power)

== Personnel ==
- Lee Mavers – lead vocals and Backing vocals, rhythm guitar
- John Power – bass and backing vocals
- Peter "Cammy" Camell – lead guitar
- Neil Mavers – battery

== Chart performance ==
Charts (1990–1991)	Peak position(s)
UK Singles Chart	57
U.S. Modern Rock Tracks	12

== Cover versions ==
The Seattle band Pearl Jam covered Timeless Melody in their Binaural Tour on 6/4/2000 when they played at The Manchester Evening News Arena, Manchester, England. During the concert lead singer Eddie Vedder incorrectly stated that the band was going to play a song written by a band from "your town". The concert is available as an Official Bootleg. Pearl Jam went on to play the song several more times on the tour, often as a duet with Supergrass frontman Gaz Coombes. Pearl Jam have also performed the song with Death Cab for Cutie in 2004.
