= Way Out (The La's song) =

Single by The La's
- B-side: "Knock Me Down" "Endless"
- Released: 2 November 1987
- Recorded: 1987
- Studio: Townhouse, London
- Genre: Pop; jangle pop; alternative rock
- Length: 2:41
- Label: Go! Discs (GOLAS 1)
- Songwriter: Lee Mavers
- Producers: Gavin MacKillop, Lee Mavers

The La's singles chronology
"Way Out" (1987)	"There She Goes" (1988)

Music video
- "Way Out" on YouTube

"Way Out"

Song by The La's

from the album The La's
- Released: 1 October 1990
- Recorded: July–September 1988, December 1989 – February 1990
- Studio: Woodcray Studios, Wokingham and Eden Studios, London
- Genre: Pop; jangle pop; alternative rock
- Length: 2:32
- Label: Polydor, Go!
- Producers: Steve Lillywhite, Bob Andrews

Audio video
- "Way Out" on YouTube

"Way Out" is the debut single by the La's, released on 2 November 1987 after signing to Go! Discs Records.

== Music video ==
The music video was made with a budget of 50 pounds. It was shot on a Super 8 Camera, with the production taking only half a day. The clip depicts the band playing inside a white room as well as a fair and the underground level of Liverpool Lime Street railway station.

== Formats and track listings ==
All songs written by Lee Mavers.

7" single (GOLAS 1)

1. "Way Out" – 2:41
2. "Endless" – 3:08

12" single (GOLAS 112)

1. "Way Out" – 2:41
2. "Knock Me Down" – 3:15
3. "Endless" – 3:08

12" EP (GOLAS 112)

1. "Way Out" – 2:41
2. "Knock Me Down" – 3:15
3. "Endless" – 3:08
4. "Liberty Ship" (4-track demo) – 1:55
5. "Freedom Song" (4-track demo) – 2:30

== Personnel ==
The La's

- Lee Mavers – lead vocals and backing vocals, acoustic guitar
- John Power – bass and backing vocals
- Paul Hemmings – electric guitar
- John "Timmo" Timson – drums, tambourine and bells

Production

- Gavin MacKillop – producer, engineer

Other personnel

- David Storey – design

== Charts ==
Chart (1987)	Peak position
UK Singles Chart	86
