= There She Goes (The La's song) =

1988 single by the La's

- Artwork for 1990 reissue

Single by the La's

from the album The La's
- B-side: "Come In, Come Out"; "Who Knows"; "Man I'm Only Human"; "All by Myself"
- Released: November 1988
- Studio: Woodcray (Wokingham, England)
- Genre: Jangle pop; dream pop; proto-Britpop; indie pop
- Length: 2:42 (album version); 2:31 (single version)
- Label: Go! Discs
- Songwriter: Lee Mavers
- Producer: Bob Andrews

The La's singles chronology
"Way Out" (1987)	"There She Goes" (1988)	"Timeless Melody" (1990)
"Timeless Melody" (1990)	"There She Goes" (1990)	"Feelin'" (1991)
"Feelin'" (1991)	"There She Goes" (2nd re-issue) (2008)

Music videos
- "There She Goes" on YouTube; "There She Goes" (US version) on YouTube

"There She Goes" is a song by English rock band the La's, written by the band's frontman, Lee Mavers. First released in November 1988 by Go! Discs, the song, the second single from the band's self-titled lone album (1990), reached number 13 on the UK Singles Chart when it was re-issued in 1990.

The song predated Britpop by four years. Rolling Stone magazine stated, "Whether about heroin or just unrequited love, the La's single 'There She Goes' off their self-titled debut has endured as a founding piece of Britpop's foundation." It was listed at number 22 on NME's "500 Greatest Songs of All Time". In 2007, NME had placed the song at number 45 in its list of the 50 Greatest Indie Anthems Ever.

== Lyrics and meaning ==
The song contains four verses, three of which are three lines long, and all four are suffixed by a single two-line chorus. The third verse functions as a bridge, and the opening lines shared by three of the verses are repeated three times in the outro.

"There She Goes" has gained a reputation for being about the use of heroin, possibly as a result of the lines: "There she goes again... racing through my brain... pulsing through my vein... no one else can heal my pain". Several newspapers ran articles about the La's and their apparent ode to heroin. When asked about the rumour in 1995, the group's bassist John Power replied: "I don't know. Truth is, I don't wanna know." However, in the book In Search of The La's: A Secret Liverpool (2003) by MW Macefield, ex-La's guitarist Paul Hemmings denied the rumour. In an interview with Les Inrockuptibles, Mavers admits to trying heroin in 1990. The song therefore predated his experience as it was originally released in 1988. Mavers himself has also emphatically denied that the song is about heroin.

The band's guitarist John Byrne said of the song, "I thought it would be big, a lot bigger than it was, but then forgotten like a lot of pop songs. In retrospect, the opposite happened."

== Release and reception ==
The first version of the song, produced by Bob Andrews, was released by the La's in 1988 and again on 2 January 1989. The 1989 release peaked at number 59 on the UK Singles Chart. Andrews' production of the song was remixed by Steve Lillywhite in 1990 for inclusion on their debut album The La's. This remixed version was issued as a single on 22 October 1990 and reached number 13 on the UK Singles Chart. In the US, it reached numbers 47 and 49 on the on the US Cash Box Top 100 and Billboard Hot 100 charts.

In May 2007, NME magazine placed "There She Goes" at number 45 in its list of the 50 Greatest Indie Anthems Ever. In 2008, it was also re-released as a vinyl single for its 20th anniversary. It was listed at number 22 on NME's list of the "500 Greatest Songs of All Time". On NPR's All Songs Considered, musician Ben Gibbard selected "There She Goes" as his pick for "perfect song." Gibbard observed that the song "defines the perfectly written pop song: an instantaneously recognizable melody and lyric set to simple, economic musical structure. It is such a simple song that it boggles the mind that someone hadn't already written it." Eric Clapton also praised the song.

In April 2021, Rolling Stone magazine stated it had "endured as a founding piece of Britpop's foundation." In December 2021, Oasis's Noel Gallagher said it was his favourite song from the 1990s; despite being released in 1988, the song didn't achieve widespread fame and acclaim until 1990. Gallagher once declared that "Oasis want to finish what The La's started".

== Music videos ==
There are two music videos for this song: a UK version and an international version.

The first video, released in 1988 and directed by Jeff Baynes, was an amateur-style recorded on a camcorder, and was shot in the English countryside and in the band's hometown of Liverpool. It shows the band performing in an alleyway, a park, and on a hill, as well as footage from their concerts. The video ends with a shot of the drum logo. This version was released exclusively for the UK, Irish, and Australian markets only but also aired in Canada for a brief period, and uses the UK-exclusive single version of the song. It is also incorrectly labeled as "US Version" on the band's YouTube channel.

To promote the album version of the song, which was released as a single worldwide, a second music video was released in 1990. Recorded on professional cameras and shot in Los Angeles, it was the band's first video to feature the new line-up, which consisted of lead guitarist Peter Camell and drummer Neil Mavers (Lee's younger brother). The second video shows them performing in the streets and neighboring towns of Los Angeles, as well as in front of the Los Angeles skyline, evidenced by the presence of the U.S. Bank Tower, while being interspliced with footage of a young woman, before ending with a shot of her face. This version, dubbed as "American version" and "International version", was released internationally and uses the album remix of the song.

== Track listings ==
All songs were written by L.A. Mavers.

1988 7-inch: Go! Discs / GOLAS 2 (UK), 870 987-7 (France)

Side one

1. "There She Goes" – 2:31

Side two

1. "Come In, Come Out" – 2:10

1988 7-inch EP: Go! Discs / LASEP 2 (UK)

Side one

1. "There She Goes" – 2:31
2. "Who Knows?" – 3:27

Side two

1. "Way Out" (new version)
2. "Come In, Come Out" – 2:10

1988 12-inch: Go! Discs / GOLAS 212 (UK)

Side one

1. "There She Goes" – 2:31
2. "Come In, Come Out" – 2:10

Side two

1. "Who Knows" – 3:27
2. "Man I'm Only Human" – 4:50

1988 CD: Go! Discs / LAS CD2 (UK)

1. "There She Goes" – 2:31
2. "Come In, Come Out" – 2:10
3. "Who Knows" – 3:27
4. "Man I'm Only Human" – 4:50

1990 7-inch: Go! Discs / GOLAS 5 (UK)

Side one

1. "There She Goes" – 2:45

Side two

1. "Freedom Song" – 2:26

1990 12-inch: Go! Discs / GOLAS 512 (UK)

Side one

1. "There She Goes" – 2:45
2. "Freedom Song"- 2:26

Side two

1. "All by Myself" – 5:53

1990 Cassette single: Go! Discs / LASMC 5 (UK)

1. "There She Goes" – 2:45
2. "Freedom Song" – 2:26

1990 CD: Go! Discs / LASCD 5 (UK)

1. "There She Goes" – 2:45
2. "Freedom Song" – 2:26
3. "All by Myself" – 5:53

Limited Edition 7-inch EP: Go! Discs / GOLAB 5 (UK)

Side one

1. "There She Goes" – 2:45
2. "Freedom Song"- 2:26

Side two

1. "All by Myself" – 5:53

=== Other reissues ===
CD single (1999)

1. "There She Goes"
2. "Come In, Come Out"
3. "Who Knows?"
4. "There She Goes" (video)

7-inch single (2008)

1. "There She Goes" (John Leckie version)
2. "There She Goes" (original single version)
3. "Way Out" (original single version)

== Personnel ==
The La's

- Lee Mavers – lead vocals and backing vocals, acoustic guitar
- John Power – bass and backing vocals
- John "Boo" Byrne – electric guitar
- Chris Sharrock – drums and tambourine

Production

- Bob Andrews – producer
- Dave Charles – engineer
- Jeremy Allom – engineer, producer (on "All by Myself")
- Mike Haas – engineer (on "All by Myself")
- Steve Lillywhite – producer, mixing (on "Freedom Song"), remixing (on "There She Goes" 1990 version)
- Mark Wallis – additional producer, engineer (on "Freedom Song")

Other personnel

- Ryan Art – design

== Charts ==
=== Original version ===
==== Weekly charts ====
Chart (1989)	Peak position
UK Singles (Official Charts)	59

Chart (1990–1991)	Peak position
Belgium (Ultratop 50 Flanders)	40
Europe (Eurochart Hot 100)	46
Ireland (IRMA)	18
Luxembourg (Radio Luxembourg)	7
Netherlands (Dutch Top 40 Tipparade)	8
Netherlands (Single Top 100)	57
UK Singles (Official Charts)	13
US Billboard Hot 100	49
US Modern Rock Tracks (Billboard)	2
US Cash Box Top 100	47

Chart (1999)	Peak position
Scottish Singles Sales (Official Charts)	62
UK Singles (Official Charts)	65

==== Year-end charts ====
Chart (1991)	Position
US Modern Rock Tracks (Billboard)	10

=== Cyril and Moonlight remix ===
==== Weekly charts ====
Chart (2025)	Peak position
Czech Republic Airplay (ČNS IFPI)	20
Estonia Airplay (TopHit)	34
Romania Airplay (TopHit)	78

==== Monthly charts ====
Chart (2025)	Peak position
Estonia Airplay (TopHit)	49

==== Year-end charts ====
Chart (2025)	Position
Estonia Airplay (TopHit)	171

== Certifications ==
Region	Certification	Certified units/sales
New Zealand (RMNZ)	Platinum	30,000^{‡}
United Kingdom (BPI)	2× Platinum	1,200,000^{‡}
^{‡} Sales+streaming figures based on certification alone.

== Sixpence None the Richer version ==
"There She Goes"

Single by Sixpence None the Richer

from the album Sixpence None the Richer
- B-side: "Kiss Me" (acoustic)
- Released: 12 July 1999
- Length: 2:43
- Label: Squint; Elektra
- Songwriter: Lee Mavers
- Producers: Steve Taylor; Matt Slocum

Sixpence None the Richer singles chronology
"Kiss Me" (1998)	"There She Goes" (1999)	"I Can't Catch You" (2000)

Music video
- "There She Goes" on YouTube

American rock band Sixpence None the Richer covered "There She Goes" and released it as the second single from their third studio album, Sixpence None the Richer (1997), in July 1999. Their version reached number two in Iceland, number 12 in Canada, number 14 on the UK Singles Chart, and number 32 on the US Billboard Hot 100.

=== Background ===
On 17 September 1998, American Christian alternative rock band Sixpence None the Richer were interviewed on Santa Monica radio station KCRW's long-running alternative music show, Morning Becomes Eclectic. During that interview, the band performed an acoustic set that included a cover of "There She Goes." The show's host, Nic Harcourt, was impressed, identifying the song as originally recorded by the La's and calling it a "genius song." This radio appearance was made available to fans on CD-R by the band's label, Squint Entertainment. This led to the recording of a studio version of the song, which was added to 1998 editions of the 1997 Sixpence None the Richer album and released as a single in 1999. A remix by Ben Grosse appears on some CD and cassette singles.

=== Track listings ===
Morning Becomes Eclectic Live Performance & Interview CD

1. "Intro"
2. "Sister, Mother" (live in studio acoustic version)
3. "Easy to Ignore" (live in studio acoustic version)
4. "Puedo Escribir" (live in studio acoustic version)
5. "Lines of My Earth" (live in studio acoustic version)
6. "Kiss Me" (live in studio acoustic version)
7. "There She Goes" (live in studio acoustic version)

UK CD and cassette single

1. "There She Goes" (LP version) – 2:42
2. "There She Goes" (Ben Grosse mix) – 2:42
3. "Kiss Me" (acoustic version) – 3:12

UK 7-inch single and European CD single

A. "There She Goes" (LP version) – 2:42
B. "Kiss Me" (acoustic version) – 3:12

Australian CD single

1. "There She Goes" (album mix) – 2:42
2. "There She Goes" (remix) – 2:42
3. "Kiss Me" (live in Hollywood, 12 February 1998) – 3:28

=== Charts ===
==== Weekly charts ====
Chart (1999)	Peak position
Australia (ARIA)	47
Belgium (Ultratip Bubbling Under Flanders)	14
Canada Top Singles (RPM)	12
Canada Adult Contemporary (RPM)	5
Canada CHR (Nielsen BDS)	18
Europe (Eurochart Hot 100)	50
Germany (GfK)	67
Iceland (Íslenski Listinn Topp 40)	2
New Zealand (Recorded Music NZ)	17
Scottish Singles Sales (Official Charts)	12
UK Singles (Official Charts)	14
US Billboard Hot 100	32
US Adult Contemporary (Billboard)	19
US Adult Pop Airplay (Billboard)	7
US Pop Airplay (Billboard)	13

==== Year-end charts ====
Chart (1999)	Position
Canada Top Singles (RPM)	54
Canada Adult Contemporary (RPM)	46
New Zealand (RIANZ)	35
US Adult Top 40 (Billboard)	37
US Mainstream Top 40 (Billboard)	58

Chart (2000)	Position
US Adult Contemporary (Billboard)	39
US Adult Top 40 (Billboard)	55

=== Certifications ===
Region	Certification	Certified units/sales
New Zealand (RMNZ)	Gold	15,000^{‡}
United States (RIAA)	Gold	500,000^{‡}
^{‡} Sales+streaming figures based on certification alone.

=== Release history ===
Region	Date	Format(s)	Label(s)	Ref(s).
United States	12 July 1999	Alternative radio	Squint; Elektra	
United States	2 August 1999	Adult contemporary; hot adult contemporary; modern adult contemporary radio	Squint; Elektra	
United States	3 August 1999	Contemporary hit radio	Squint; Elektra	
United Kingdom	6 September 1999	7-inch vinyl; CD; cassette	Squint; Elektra	

== In media ==
It has appeared on several film soundtracks, including The Parent Trap; Fever Pitch; Girl, Interrupted; Cold Case; The Adventures of Pete and Pete; and So I Married an Axe Murderer (where both the original and The Boo Radleys version appear). It also opens the "Pilot" episode of Gilmore Girls. Sixpence None the Richer's version of the song was used in Snow Day, Family Guy and the commercials for birth-control company Ortho Tri-Cyclen Lo from 2004 to 2005.

The song was also used for the opening montage of the first episode, "Spring", of Channel 4's drama series This Is England '90, which also featured outgoing Prime Minister Margaret Thatcher's resignation speech.

The song was used frequently for slow-motion scenes with Nori Sterling (Reylynn Caster) in the U.S. TV series Me, Myself & I.

The BBC comedy drama There She Goes was named after the song, as the show’s creator Shaun Pye listened to it whilst writing the first script.
