= Love Is a Wonderful Colour =

Single by The Icicle Works

from the album The Icicle Works
- B-side: "Waterline"
- Released: 28 October 1983
- Recorded: 1983
- Genre: New wave
- Label: Beggars Banquet
- Songwriter: Ian McNabb
- Producer: David Lord

The Icicle Works singles chronology
"Birds Fly (Whisper to a Scream)" (1983)	"Love Is a Wonderful Colour" (1983)	"Birds Fly (Whisper to a Scream) (reissue)" (1984)

"Love Is a Wonderful Colour" is a song by British new wave band the Icicle Works. It was released in 1983 as the second single from the band's 1984 debut eponymous album The Icicle Works. The song was written by Ian McNabb, produced by David Lord and mixed by Hugh Jones. It is the band's biggest hit, reaching No. 15 on the UK Singles Chart in late 1983.

== Track listings ==
7" vinyl

A. "Love Is a Wonderful Colour"
B. "Waterline"

12" vinyl

A. "Love Is a Wonderful Colour" (long version)
B1. "Waterline"
B2. "In the Dance the Shaman Led"
