= The La's =

English rock band

- The La's in 1990; Left to right: Lee Mavers, Peter "Cammy" Cammell, Neil Mavers and John Power

Background information
- Origin: Liverpool, England
- Genres: Jangle pop; indie pop; Britpop; skiffle
- Years active: 1983–1992, 1994–1995, 2005, 2011
- Labels: Go!; Polydor; Viper
- Past members: Lee Mavers: Neil Mavers; John Power; Peter "Cammy" Cammell; (see Band members section for others)

The La's were an English rock band from Liverpool, originally active from 1983 until 1992. Fronted by singer, songwriter and guitarist Lee Mavers, the group are best known for their hit single "There She Goes" (1988). The band was formed by Mike Badger in 1983 and Mavers joined the next year, but, for most of the group's history, the frequently-changing line-up revolved around the core duo of Lee Mavers (vocals, guitar) and John Power (bass, backing vocals) along with numerous other guitarists and drummers including Paul Hemmings, John "Timmo" Timson, Peter "Cammy" Cammell, Iain Templeton, John "Boo" Byrne, Chris Sharrock, and Neil Mavers.

After the departure of Badger in late 1986, the band signed to Go! Discs in 1987 and started recording their debut album. Following the release of singles "Way Out" (1987), "There She Goes" (1988) and "Timeless Melody" (1990) and having aborted several recording sessions with different producers, the band released their debut album, The La's, in 1990 to critical acclaim and modest commercial success. John Power left the La's to form Cast and the group entered a prolonged hiatus in 1992. The group later reformed briefly in the mid-1990s, 2005 and 2011, but no new recordings have been released.

== History ==
=== 1983–1986: Formation and early years ===
The La's formed in 1983, with original member Mike Badger stating that the band name occurred to him in a dream, as well as it being Scouse for "lads" ("La'" is just an abbreviation for "lad", so "The La's" simply means "The Lads") and also having obvious musical connotations. The band existed briefly as an arthouse/skiffle-type outfit with a few tracks released on local compilations. Lee Mavers joined in 1984 as rhythm guitarist, eventually gaining songwriting prominence and emerging as the band's enduring figurehead. Bernie Nolan, accomplished musician formerly of the Falcons, The Russian Rockabillys and The Swampmen was the original bassist. John Power joined the group in 1986, having met Badger on a local council-run musicianship course. Badger left the group in late 1986 to form the Onset.

The band attracted the attention of several record labels after a series of performances in their hometown in 1986, and demo tapes copied from a session at the Flying Picket rehearsal studio in Liverpool began circulating. One of these demo tapes was sent to Underground Magazine. A journalist there with the task of reviewing unsigned bands gave the cassette to Andy McDonald at Go Discs. Several record labels later became interested in signing the band. The band chose to sign with Go! Discs.

=== 1987–1990: Record deal and The La's album ===
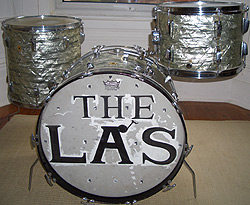
Neil Mavers' 1964 Ludwig drum kit used during his time in the La's

The band's first single, "Way Out", was mixed with producer Gavin MacKillop. When it was released in October 1987, it broke into the top 100 and was praised by the Smiths' frontman Morrissey in the music magazine Melody Maker, but attracted little notice. The band continued to perform around the UK and gained success as a live act, drawing comparisons to the Beatles due to their origins, vaguely Merseybeat sound, and Mavers' expressive lyrics. "There She Goes" was released in 1988 with the B-sides "Come in Come Out" and "Who Knows". The song garnered moderate attention and airplay, but performed poorly in the charts. The music video for "There She Goes" features the La's scampering through run-down Liverpool streets and was filmed in an afternoon on a hand-held camera. It was re-released a number of times, the earliest being 1990's Steve Lillywhite mix. After working with producer Jeremy Allom at the Pink Museum Studio in Liverpool in May 1989, the band were set to release "Timeless Melody" as a single. While test pressings had been sent out for review, and it was awarded "single of the week" in Melody Maker, Mavers was reportedly unhappy with the production and the single release was scrapped.

The La's then spent two years fruitlessly recording and re-recording their intended debut album, with a constantly changing band line-up, where only the core of Mavers and Power remained the same. Discarded producers included The Smiths' producer John Porter, as well as John Leckie and Mike Hedges. Both Leckie and Hedges have nevertheless spoken positively in interviews about the band's songs and their respective sessions. The previously volatile band line-up settled in 1989 with Lee's brother, Neil Mavers on drums, and Peter "Cammy" Cammell as lead guitarist. The group then entered London's Eden Studios in December 1989 to again record their debut album with Simple Minds and U2 producer Steve Lillywhite. Despite this line-up being arguably the most stable, and press interviews from the time painting them as extremely confident, the sessions still did not satisfy Mavers. In one instance Mavers was reported to have rejected a vintage mixing desk, claiming it did not have the right sound because "it hasn't got original Sixties dust on it", although this claim has since been revealed as apocryphal. The Eden sessions with Lillywhite would become the band's final attempt at recording the album. The frustration of not achieving the right sound and mood in their songs, as well as increasing friction with Go! Discs, who had spent considerable money on recording sessions for the album, led to them simply giving up on the sessions. Lillywhite pieced together the recordings he had made with the group into what became the eventually released album. The band, particularly Lee Mavers, were not pleased with this decision. Among the band's complaints were that Lillywhite used vocal guide tracks on the LP and that he did not "understand" their sound. In an October 1990 NME interview with Stuart Maconie, Mavers said that he "hated" the album because of the sound, which was "All f---ed up like a snake with a broken back".

Recognition, at least critically, came for the La's in 1990 when the self-titled album, The La's, was released. The album reached No. 30 in the UK charts and received a Silver certification, but the album did not fare as well overseas. The album only reached No. 196 on the Billboard 200 and to date has sold fewer than 50,000 copies in the U.S. The album included, among new material, re-recorded versions of all the previous singles, including a remixed version of "There She Goes" which was then re-released as a single. This time around, the song reached number 13 in the UK singles chart and remains the most visible and enduring of all the band's songs. Additional singles from the album included the LP versions of "Timeless Melody" and "Feelin'". Both sold reasonably well, reaching chart placings around the top 40. A short promotional tour proceeded, accompanied by television appearances on shows such as Top of the Pops.

=== 1991–2003: John Power's departure and hiatus ===
1991 promotional tour dates were fulfilled in the UK and Europe including a few festivals, and a US tour. Bassist John Power left the group on 13 December 1991, frustrated with having played essentially the same set of songs since 1986, and resurfaced a year later with his band Cast. The remainder of the 1991 concerts were performed with James Joyce on bass as well as a handful of 1992 dates. The band stopped touring and rehearsing in 1992 until further short-lived reunions, with various line-ups, throughout the 1990s and 2000s.

The La's reunited sporadically for a series of live performances throughout 1994 and 1995. The comeback was brought about due to a merchandising debt from the 1991 U.S. tour and the band played support slots to artists such as Oasis, Paul Weller and Dodgy. The reformed band consisted of differing line-ups for each concert and as well as Lee Mavers other performers included several former members such as Barry Sutton, Lee Garnett, John "Boo" Byrne, James Joyce, Peter "Cammy" Cammell and Neil Mavers.

In 1996, Mavers began recording at The Arch studio in Kew, London owned by ex-the Damned drummer Rat Scabies. Initially working alone, he was later joined in the studio by ex-the Stairs frontman Edgar Jones, Lee Garnett and Neil Mavers. The sessions ended because of damp in the studio, however Mavers and Summertyme continued to rehearse and record in Liverpool for a year. After the collapse of Go! Discs, Mavers recording contract with the label was acquired by PolyGram and eventually expired in 1998. In 1998, Mavers began rehearsing with the then unsigned Liverpool band the Crescent. A bootleg recording of one of these rehearsals known as The Crescent Tape would later leak on to the Internet.

In the late 1990s, Mavers renewed contact with founder member Mike Badger and subsequently two compilation albums of early demos and home recordings were released by The Viper Label (founded by ex-La's Badger and Hemmings), Lost La's 1984–1986: Breakloose (1999) and Lost La's 1986–1987: Callin' All (2001). A Japan only compilation album Singles Collection (2001) was released by Universal Music Japan containing all of the band's singles and b-sides released from 1987 to 1991. A biography about the band In Search of The La's: A Secret Liverpool by MW Macefield was published in 2003. The book contained interviews with many former members of the La's including Lee Mavers, John Power, Mike Badger, Paul Hemmings, Barry Sutton, Peter "Cammy" Cammell and Neil Mavers.

=== 2004–2011: Reformations ===
Following a reunion between Mavers and John Power, the La's reformed in June 2005 with a line-up of Lee Mavers (vocals, guitar), John Power (bass, backing vocals), ex-Cracatilla frontman Jay Lewis (guitar) and Nick Miniski (drums), playing dates in England and Ireland ahead of an appearance at the Summer Sonic festival in Japan as well as a spot at the 2005 Glastonbury Festival and other UK festivals. After three concerts, Miniski was replaced as drummer by roadie Jim "Jasper" Fearon, who was Mavers' school friend and one time bass player for the La's. The set lists were mostly the same as in the late 1980s, although certain encores contained some previously unheard songs such as "Gimme the Blues" and "Sorry". Since the reunion gigs it has been rumoured that Mavers has continued working on the La's' elusive second album. When interviewed in August 2006, John Power explained that Mavers was still "tinkering with something that's majestic" and of the release date, "I can’t tell you where and when...' cos whatever he does, whether it’s in this lifetime or the next, it can’t be rushed".

A compilation of the La's' live radio sessions BBC in Session was released on 18 September 2006. In 2008, a new deluxe edition of The La's was released containing the lost Mike Hedges album, alternate recordings and live recordings for radio and television including previously unreleased songs "I Am the Key" and a Buddy Holly cover "That'll Be the Day". Also Lost Tunes (2008) was released as a download only EP of studio out-takes and alternate recordings.

After being introduced to each other by Gary Murphy of the Bandits, Lee Mavers began jamming with Pete Doherty in 2008 and appeared on stage with Doherty during his 2009 tour. Mavers then started performing live with artists such as Drew McConnell and Jon McClure in London in April 2009. In 2009 Babyshambles drummer Adam Ficek revealed plans of the La's' second album to be recorded with the Babyshambles as backing band and Drew McConnell revealed plans for him to join the La's as bassist; this supposed lineup did not materialise and live appearances were cancelled. In 2010, a four-disc box-set of singles, b-sides, studio out-takes, alternate recordings and live material Callin' All (2010) was released by Polydor which collected most of the band's still unreleased recordings produced whilst signed to Go! Discs.

In June 2011 Lee Mavers, accompanied by Gary Murphy on bass guitar, played a surprise concert in Manchester under the name Lee Rude & The Velcro Underpants. Following this Mavers and Murphy reformed the La's and played a series of "stripped back" shows across the UK and Europe including a performance at Rock en Seine festival in France in August 2011.

== Musical style and legacy ==
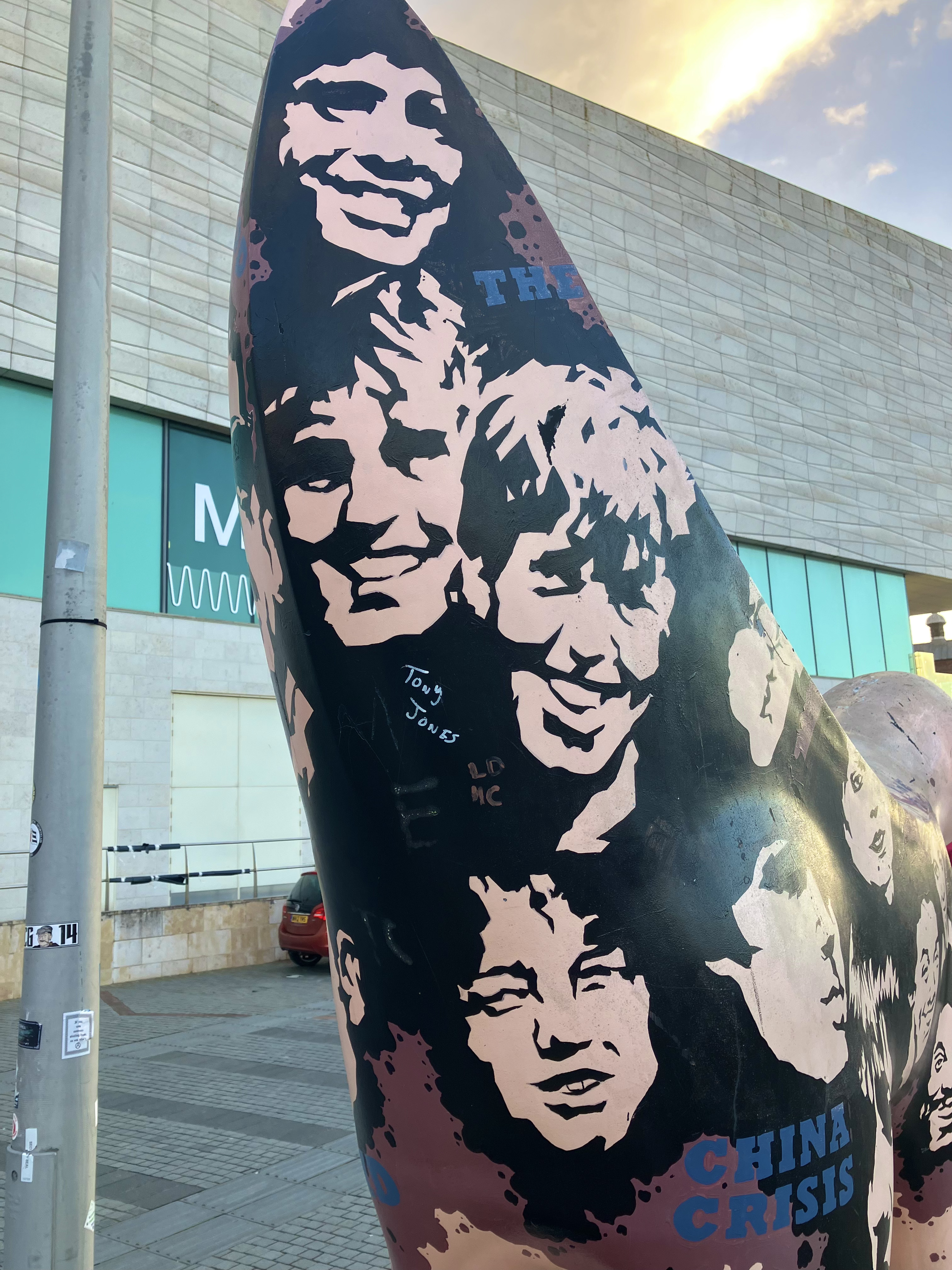
The "core lineup" from 1990 to 1991. From top to bottom: Neil Mavers, Peter Cammell, Lee Mavers, John Power.

Lee Mavers has described their sound as "rootsy" and "raw and organic", whilst AllMusic have noted the band's "simple, tuneful, acoustic-driven arrangements". The La's were also noted for their distinctly different style to other popular British bands in the late 1980s, such as the Stone Roses and Happy Mondays, who were part of the Madchester movement.

The sound of the La's has been compared to that of Merseybeat and 1960s British rock music, and the band received comparisons with the earlier Liverpudlian band the Beatles. Founding member Mike Badger has named Captain Beefheart as the La's' main influence; the band have also cited artists such as Bo Diddley, Bob Dylan, Louis Armstrong, the Beatles, the Rolling Stones, the Who, the Kinks, Bob Marley, Pink Floyd, Jimi Hendrix, Duke Ellington, and Ella Fitzgerald as influences.

Pitchfork named The La's as one of the best Britpop albums, placing the album at number 14 in their 50 Best Britpop Albums list. Noel Gallagher of Oasis named it as one of his 13 favourite albums, and they have been cited as an influence by the Courteeners, the Stone Roses, the Charlatans, the Libertines and the 1975.

== Post-La's activities ==
Bassist John Power went on to form Cast in 1992, releasing 4 studio albums before splitting in 2001. Guitarists Barry Sutton and Peter Cammell featured in an early lineup of the band. Cast reformed in 2010. In 2016, Jay Lewis who performed with the band in 2005, later joined Cast as bassist.

Mike Badger and Paul Hemmings later played together in the Onset and started The Viper Label, releasing many early recording compilations by the La's.

In the mid-'90s, Neil Mavers joined Liverpool group Bullit, featuring David McDonnell, later of the Sand Band.

In 1998, Cammell and drummer Neil Mavers continued to work together after the La's' breakup under the name Cami. The band was managed by former La's and then-current Cast manager, Rob Swerdlow. The band recorded a nine-track album with future Coldplay producer Ken Nelson at Parr Street Studios in October 1999, but the band split up leaving the album unreleased. The album tapes re-surfaced in October 2015, with plans for a near-future release. In common with many tapes from the 90s and earlier they had become sticky and required baking to restore the oxide binder to its original condition and make them playable; this was carried out at London's FX Copyroom.

Neil Mavers and Cammell briefly reunited once more in 2002, performing with another former La's member, guitarist Barry Sutton in Heavy Lemon. The band played three shows in 18 months before disbanding. Cammell also performed with Sutton again in his jam-style project Beatnik Hurricane in 2015, playing dates in Liverpool, including residencies at The Everyman Bistro and a tour of Ireland, most notably a sold-out show in Dublin.

In 2015, previous recordings and demos by Cammell's band surfaced online (most notably the song "Make A Chain"), which led to Cammell forming a new band named Cami & the Reverbs, managed by La's associate Chris Parkes. The band consisted of Mick Marshall (guitar, the Joneses) Phil Murphy (drums, the Red Elastic Band) Leon De Sylva (drums, Electrafixion), Daniel Lunt (bass), David 'Swee' Sweeney (drums, the Bandits), and Mark McInnes (bass, the Levons). Cami & the Reverbs played sporadic shows across Liverpool including a support slot with Liverpool group Rain and a Christmas Show at The Zanzibar.

In 2018, a BBC TV comedy-drama series entitled There She Goes features a cover version of the La's song of that name.

== Members ==
=== Principal members ===
- Lee Mavers – guitar, vocals (1984–1992, 1994–1995, 2005, 2011)
- John Power – bass, backing vocals (1986–1991, 2005)
- Peter "Cammy" Cammell – guitar, bass (1988, 1989–1992, 1994–1995)
- Neil Mavers – drums (1989–1992, 1994–1995)

=== Other members ===
- Mike Badger – guitar, vocals (1983–1986)
- Sean Eddleston – guitar (1984)
- John "Timmo" Timson – drums (1984–1985, 1986–1987)
- Phil Butcher – bass (1984)
- Jim "Jasper" Fearon – bass, drums (1985, 2005)
- Bernie Nolan – bass (1985–1986)
- Tony Clarke – drums (1985–1986)
- Paul Rhodes – drums (1986)
- Barry Walsh – drums (1986)
- Paul Hemmings – guitar (1987)
- Mark Birchall – drums (1987)
- Iain Templeton – drums (1988; died 2022)
- John "Boo" Byrne – guitar (1988, 1995)
- Chris Sharrock – drums (1988–1989)
- Barry Sutton – guitar (1988–1989, 1991)
- James Joyce – bass (1991–1992, 1994)
- Lee Garnett – guitar (1994–1995)
- Jay Lewis – guitar (2005)
- Nick Miniski – drums (2005)
- Gary Murphy – bass (2011)

== Discography ==
=== Studio album ===
Title	Album details	Peak chart positions	
Title	Album details	UK	US
The La's	Released: 1 October 1990; Label: Polydor, Go!, London; Format: LP, CD	30	196

=== Compilation albums ===
- Lost La's 1984–1986: Breakloose (1999)
- Singles Collection (2001)
- Lost La's 1986–1987: Callin' All (2001)
- BBC in Session (2006)
- Lost Tunes (2008)
- De Freitas Sessions '87 (2010)
- Callin' All (2010)
- There she goes: the collection (2015)
- The La's 1986-1987 (2017)
- The La's Live (1986–1987) (2021)

=== Singles ===
Title	Year	Peak chart positions				Certifications	Album
Title	Year	UK	NLD	US	US Alt.	Certifications	Album
"Way Out"	1987	86	—	—	—		The La's
"There She Goes"	1988	59	—	—	—	BPI: 2× Platinum	The La's
"Timeless Melody"	1990	57	—	—	12		The La's
"There She Goes" (re-release)	1990	13	57	49	2		The La's
"Feelin'"	1991	43	—	—	—		The La's

=== Other appearances ===
- A Secret Liverpool (1984) "I Don't Like Hanging Around"
- Elegance, Charm and Deadly Danger (1985) "My Girl (Sits Like a Reindeer)" and "Sweet 35"
- Unearthed: Liverpool Cult Classics, Vol. 1 (2001) "Don't Lock Me Out"
- Lo-Fi Acoustic Excursions (2004) "Cool Water"
- Lo-Fi Electric Excursions (2006) "Midnight Shift", "Painting Dub", "Space Rocketry"
