= Chris Layhe =

English musician

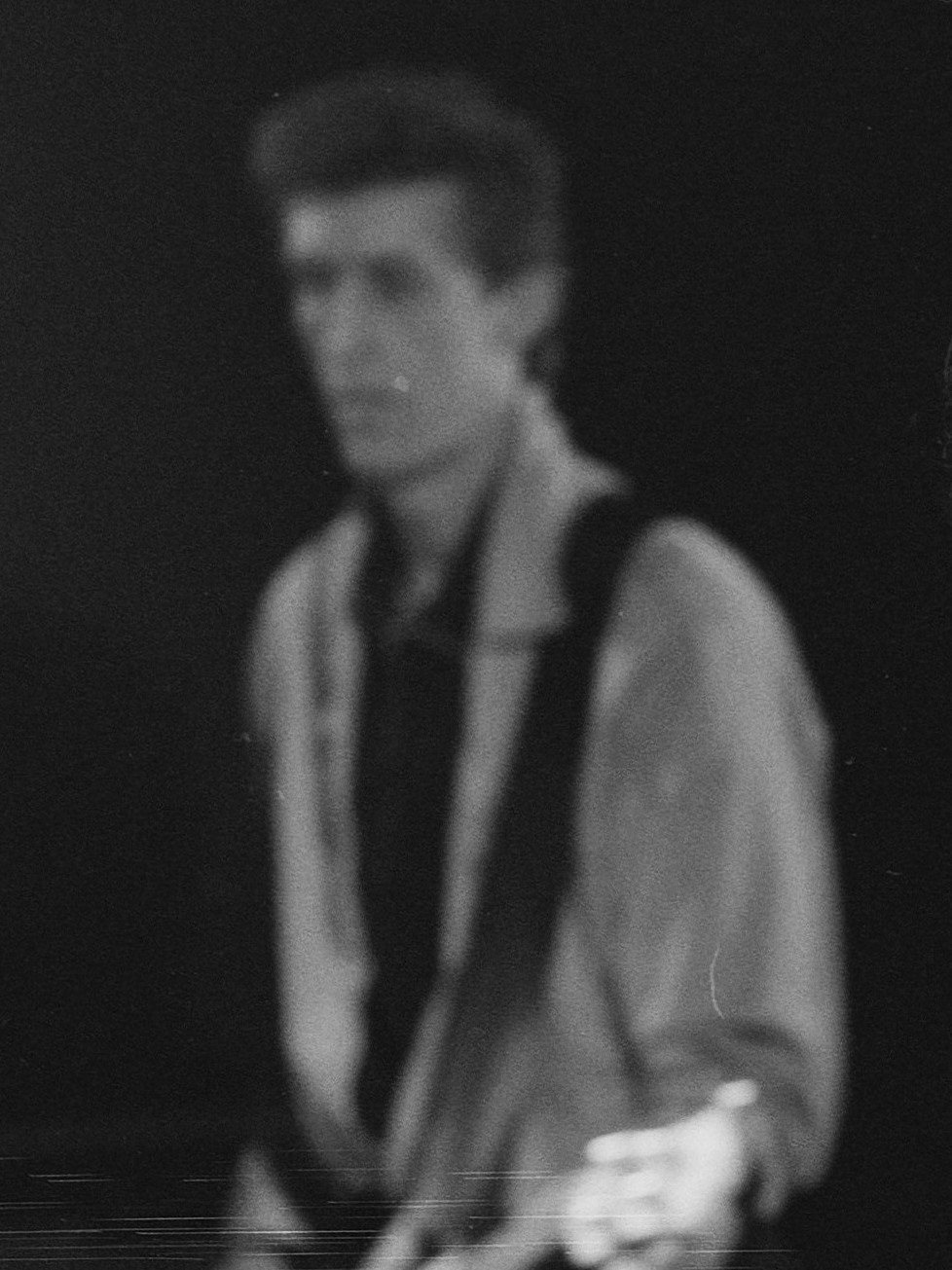
Layhe in 1987

Chris Layhe is an English musician, and founding member of Liverpool alternative rock band, The Icicle Works.

Signed to Beggar's Banquet, The Icicle Works had a handful of chart hits (notably "Birds Fly (Whisper to a Scream)") and toured the US and mainland Europe before the departure of original members Layhe and drummer Chris Sharrock in 1989.

In the 1990s, Layhe worked as events organiser at Blue Coat Arts Centre in Liverpool, co-ordinating appearances by Tori Amos and Doris Lessing, among others.

Though originally a bassist, Layhe currently teaches guitar at the Manchester Adult Education Service. Co-writer (with Ian McNabb) of several early Icicle Works songs, he has also performed his own work solo, and with blues rock band Oyster, in venues throughout the north of England.

In 2009, Layhe formed the indie rock band Shadow History, with the Australian singer/guitarist Ben Winch, and returned to bass playing after a lengthy hiatus.
