= Blind (The Icicle Works album) =

Studio album by the Icicle Works
- Released: May 1988
- Length: 48:06
- Label: Beggars Banquet (U.K.); RCA (U.S.)
- Producer: Ian McNabb

The Icicle Works chronology
If You Want to Defeat Your Enemy Sing His Song (1987)	Blind (1988)	Permanent Damage (1990)

Blind is the fourth album by the English band the Icicle Works, released in 1988. It was the band's final album with their original lineup. The album peaked at No. 40 on the UK Albums Chart. "High Time" peaked at No. 13 on Billboard's Modern Rock Tracks chart.

== Critical reception ==
Professional ratings
Review scores
Source	Rating
AllMusic	2.5/5 stars
The Encyclopedia of Popular Music	3/5 stars

The Ottawa Citizen wrote that "the album finds the band groping its way through a mish-mash of styles making no particular commitment to any it stumbles on." The Kingston Whig-Standard noted that "the title track is a classic gospel ballad with social consciousness-raising lyrics to match." Trouser Press deemed the album "a mixed-up mainstream mush of loud rock, quiet soul and gutless funk."

== Track listing ==
All songs written by Ian McNabb.

=== UK version ===
==== Side A ====
1. "Intro" - 0:29
2. "Shit Creek" - 4:01
3. "High Time" - 3:34
4. "Little Girl Lost" - 4:44
5. "Starry Blue Eyed Wonder" - 4:12
6. "One True Love" - 1:51
7. "Blind" - 5:30

==== Side B ====
1. "Two Two Three" - 2:23
2. "What Do You Want Me to Do?" - 3:12
3. "Stood Before Saint Peter" - 5:25
4. "The Kiss Off" - 4:23
5. "Here Comes Trouble" - 4:03
6. "Walk a While with Me" - 4:19

=== US version ===
In comparison to the version issued in the UK and Canada, the US version loses four tracks ("Intro", "One True Love", "What Do You Want Me to Do", and "Two Two Three") edits one track ("Shit Creek" is edited to end much earlier), and adds two tracks ("Sure Thing" and "Hot Profit Gospel"). As well, the UK version of "High Time" has a slightly elongated ending in order to mix seamlessly and directly into "Little Girl Lost". The two tracks are not consecutive on the US album, and this elongated ending is therefore dropped.

==== Side A ====
1. "The Kiss Off" - 4:22
2. "Shit Creek" - 2:56
3. "Little Girl Lost" - 4:45
4. "Starry Blue Eyed Wonder" - 4:13
5. "Blind" - 5:36

==== Side B ====
1. "Sure Thing" - 4:55
2. "Hot Profit Gospel" - 3:44
3. "High Time" - 3:26
4. "Stood Before St. Peter" - 5:26
5. "Here Comes Trouble" - 4:05
6. "Walk a While with Me" - 4:24
