= Chris Sharrock =

British drummer (born 1964)

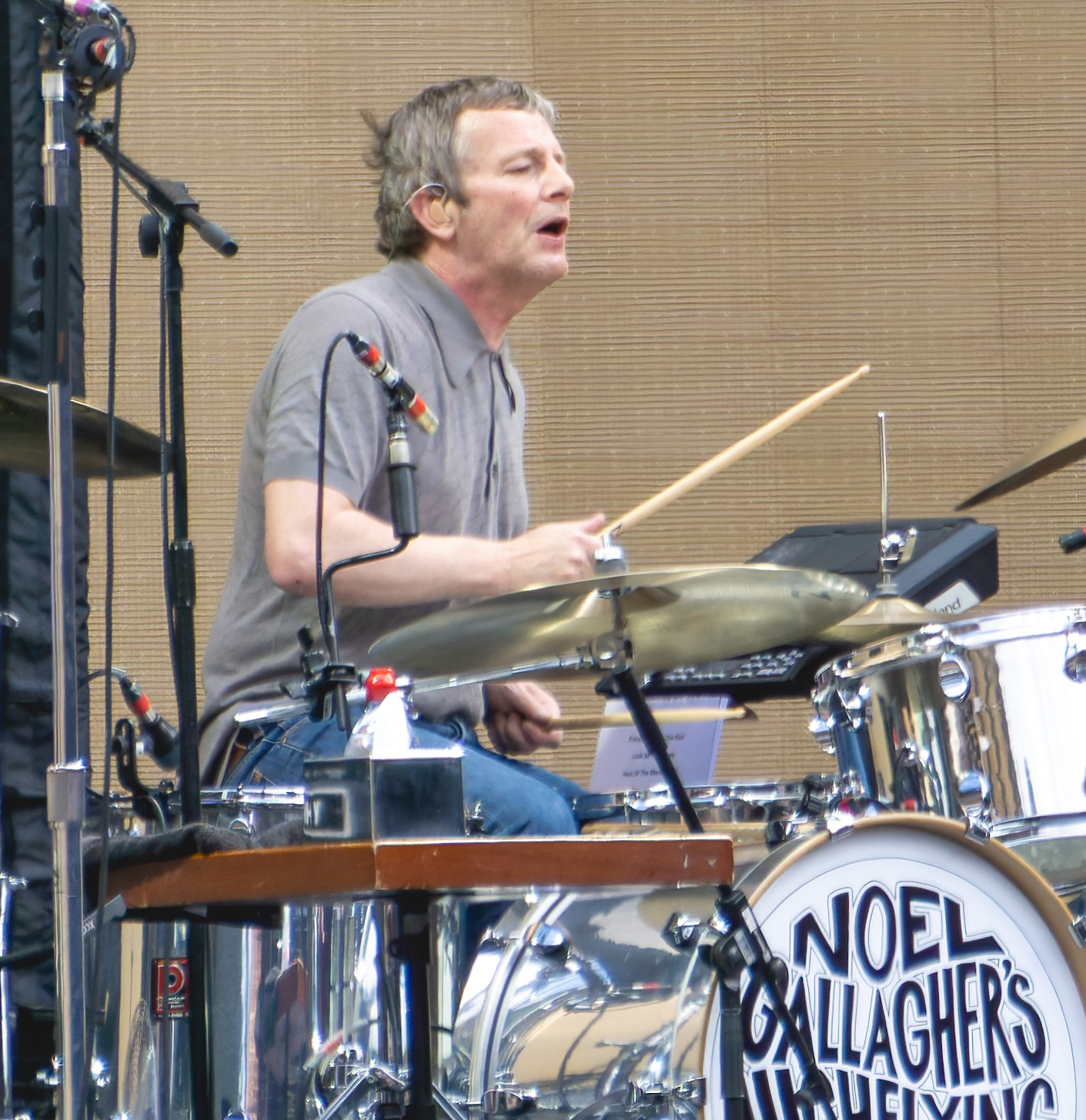
- Sharrock performing with Noel Gallagher's High Flying Birds in 2017

Background information
- Born: 30 May 1964 (age 62)
- Origin: Bebington, Wirral, England
- Genres: Alternative rock, indie rock, pop, electronic
- Instruments: Drums, percussion
- Years active: 1980–present
- Member of: Noel Gallagher's High Flying Birds
- Formerly of: The Cherry Boys, the Icicle Works, the La's, the Wild Swans, World Party, the Lightning Seeds, Beady Eye

Chris Sharrock (born 30 May 1964) is an English drummer from Bebington, Cheshire, currently based in Merseyside. He was most recently a member of Noel Gallagher's High Flying Birds and has previously been a member of the La's, Beady Eye, the Icicle Works, the Wild Swans, World Party, the Lightning Seeds and Robbie Williams's backing band.

As a member of the La's, Sharrock recorded drums on the band's 1988 single, "There She Goes", considered a "founding piece of Britpop's foundation." Between 1997 and 2008, Sharrock was the drummer for Robbie Williams, appearing on the UK Albums Chart number one albums, Life thru a Lens (1997), I've Been Expecting You (1998), Sing When You're Winning (2000) and Escapology (2003).

Between 2008 and 2009, Sharrock was the touring drummer for Oasis during its Dig Out Your Soul Tour. Following the band's break-up in August 2009, Sharrock and the remaining band members, Liam Gallagher, Andy Bell and Gem Archer, reformed under the name Beady Eye, releasing two studio albums – Different Gear, Still Speeding (2011) and BE (2013) – before disbanding in October 2014. Sharrock joined Noel Gallagher's High Flying Birds in 2016, reuniting him with Oasis member Noel Gallagher, and making him and Gem Archer the only members of Oasis to have been part of both Liam and Noel Gallagher's post-Oasis projects.

== Career ==
Sharrock's recording career began as a member of the Cherry Boys; he was the drummer on the band's first single, "Man to Man", released in January 1981. Sharrock then left the Cherry Boys for the Icicle Works, with whom he stayed until 1988, playing on the band's first four albums. He then left that band and briefly joined the La's, drumming on their hit single "There She Goes". He left the La's shortly thereafter, and drummed on the Wild Swans' second album in 1990.

Sharrock subsequently joined World Party as an official member in the mid-1990s, followed by a stint in the Lightning Seeds. In 1994, he was a member of "Terry and the Lovemen", a one-off recording project that was actually the band XTC appearing on their own tribute album under a pseudonym. Sharrock also played drums on Del Amitri's 1995 album Twisted, but was not an official member of that band. By 1998, Sharrock was the drummer in Robbie Williams' band, a position he held for the next 8 years.

Sharrock became a touring guest for Oasis he played on the Dig Out Your Soul tour. he performed several times whilst touring with Oasis during 2008 and 2009. As well, he was noted for his flamboyant tricks with his drumsticks, including twirling them during the intro to "Morning Glory" and throwing them up in the air now and again.

In an interview given during the South American tour of 2009 (posted by Noel Gallagher on the Official Oasis Blog), Noel Gallagher, asked to compare the drumming prowess of Chris Sharrock and Zak Starkey, stated that they are both the same. Starkey and Sharrock have an extremely similar history, very often taking over from each other; Sharrock was Starkey's predecessor as the drummer for both the Icicle Works and the Lightning Seeds.

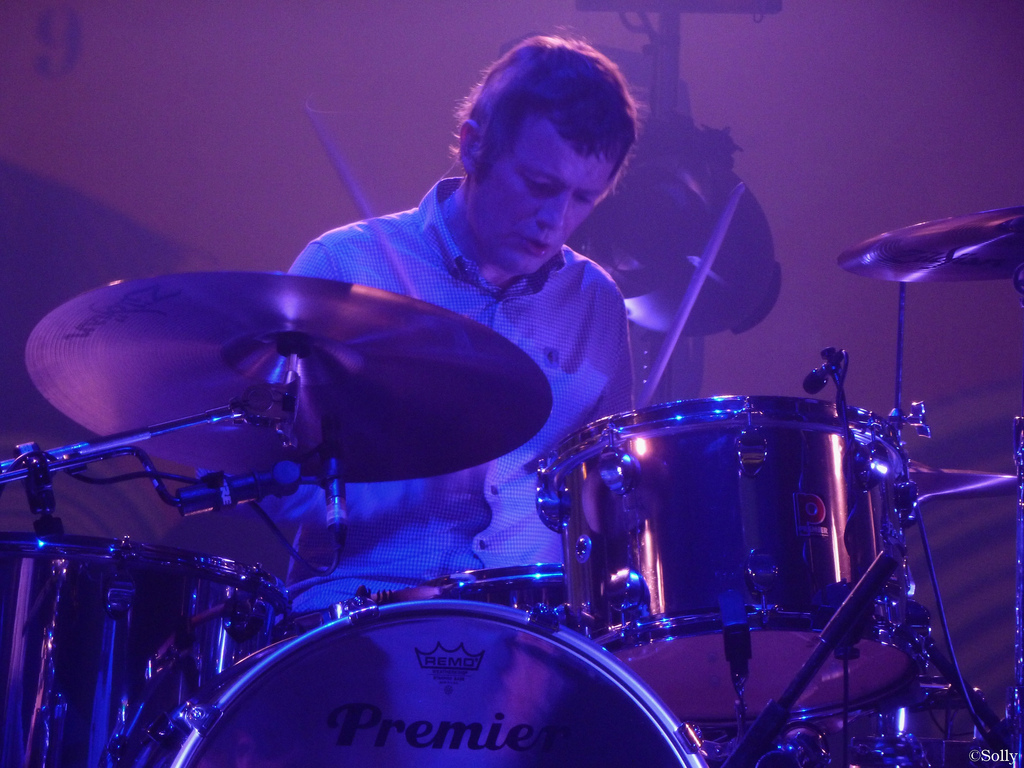
Sharrock in concert with Beady Eye in 2011

Sharrock formed Beady Eye with Liam Gallagher, Gem Archer, and Andy Bell. He would be featured on their two studio albums Different Gear, Still Speeding and BE. When Beady Eye disbanded, Sharrock joined the touring band for Noel Gallagher's High Flying Birds, who were promoting the album Chasing Yesterday. Along with his former bandmate Archer, Sharrock was announced as a full-time member for Noel Gallagher's High Flying Birds during the 2017 recording sessions of Who Built The Moon? Sharrock did not, however, appear on the album in any capacity.

He did appear on the band's next album, 2023's Council Skies, drumming on about half the tracks.

Sharrock was offered to be the drummer for Oasis' Live '25 Tour but rejected for unknown reasons, with Joey Waronker being selected as his replacement.

== Associated acts ==
- The Cherry Boys (1980–1981)
- The Icicle Works (1981–1988)
- The La's (1988–1989)
- The Wild Swans (1990)
- World Party (1990–1997)
- Del Amitri (1995)
- The Lightning Seeds (1994–1996)
- Robbie Williams (1997–2008)
- Oasis (2008–2009)
- Beady Eye (2009–2014)
- Noel Gallagher's High Flying Birds (2016–present)

== Session discography ==
- The Icicle Works – The Icicle Works (1984)
- The Icicle Works – The Small Price of a Bicycle (1985)
- The Icicle Works – If You Want to Defeat Your Enemy Sing His Song (1987)
- The Icicle Works – Blind (1988)
- The La's – "There She Goes" (1988)
- The Wild Swans – Space Flower (1990)
- World Party – Bang! (1993)
- Terry Hall – Home (1993)
- Del Amitri – Twisted (1995)
- Spiritualized – Pure Phase (1995)
- The Lightning Seeds – Dizzy Heights (1996)
- World Party – Egyptology (1997)
- Robbie Williams – Life thru a Lens (1997)
- Terry Hall – Laugh (1997)
- Robbie Williams – I've Been Expecting You (1998)
- Robbie Williams -The Ego Has Landed (1999)
- Tom Jones – Reload (1999)
- Eurythmics – Peace (1999)
- Sack Trick – (Music From) The Mystery Rabbits (1999)
- Sack Trick – Penguins on the Moon (2000)
- Mike Badger – Double Zero (2000)
- Sinéad O'Connor – Faith and Courage (2000)
- Robbie Williams – Sing When You're Winning (2000)
- Robbie Williams – United (2000)
- Robbie Williams - Escapology (2003)
- Robbie Williams – Live at Knebworth (2003)
- Mick Jagger & Dave Stewart – Alfie (2004)
- Robbie Williams – Greatest Hits (2004)
- Beady Eye – Different Gear, Still Speeding (2011)
- The Justice Collective – "He Ain't Heavy, He's My Brother" (2012)
- Beady Eye – BE (2013)
- Noel Gallagher's High Flying Birds – Black Star Dancing (2019)
- Robbie Williams – XXV (2022)
- Noel Gallagher's High Flying Birds – Council Skies (2023)

== Drum kit ==
Chris used a Premier Series kit, made especially for the last Oasis tour.

It includes (All in Chrome finish):

- 24" x 14" Maple Shell Bass Drum
- 14" x 10" Rack Tom
- 16" x 16" Floor Tom
- 14" x 5.5" Steel Shell Parallel Action Snare Drum.

His cymbal setup on the last Beady Eye tour was composed of Zildjian cymbals;

- 21" A Sweet Ride
- 14" K Mastersound Hihats
- 17" A Rezo Crash
- 20" A Medium Crash

In Oasis, his setup was made up of, (L-R):

- 21" K Crash Ride
- 19" Avedis Custom Rezo Crash (Left side)
- 14" K Mastersound Hihats
- 21" Avedis Sweet Ride
- 21" K Crash Ride

He uses Zildjian 5A's drumsticks and Remo drumheads.

- Remo Clear Power Stroke 3 with White Falam Patch (Bass drum)
- Remo Coated Ambassadors (Snare, Tom and Floor Tom)
