= Lee Mavers =

English musician (born 1962)

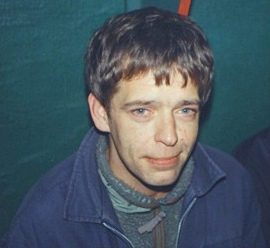
- Mavers at the Picket in Liverpool, December 1999.

Background information
- Born: Lee Antony Mavers; 2 August 1962 (age 63); Liverpool, England
- Genres: Alternative rock
- Occupations: Singer; songwriter; musician
- Instruments: Vocals; guitar; bass; drums; harmonica
- Years active: 1980–2011; 2024

Lee Antony Mavers (born 2 August 1962) is an English musician, best known for being the lead vocalist and rhythm guitarist in the La's.

== The La's ==
Mavers gained a reputation for perfectionism and eccentricity particularly due to the fraught recording of their debut album. Obsessing over the group's troubled recording efforts between 1987 and 1992, Mavers eventually retreated to his Liverpool home after the release of the La's' eponymous debut album, his perception of the music industry soured by the fact the release was not a version of the album he had wished to be made public.

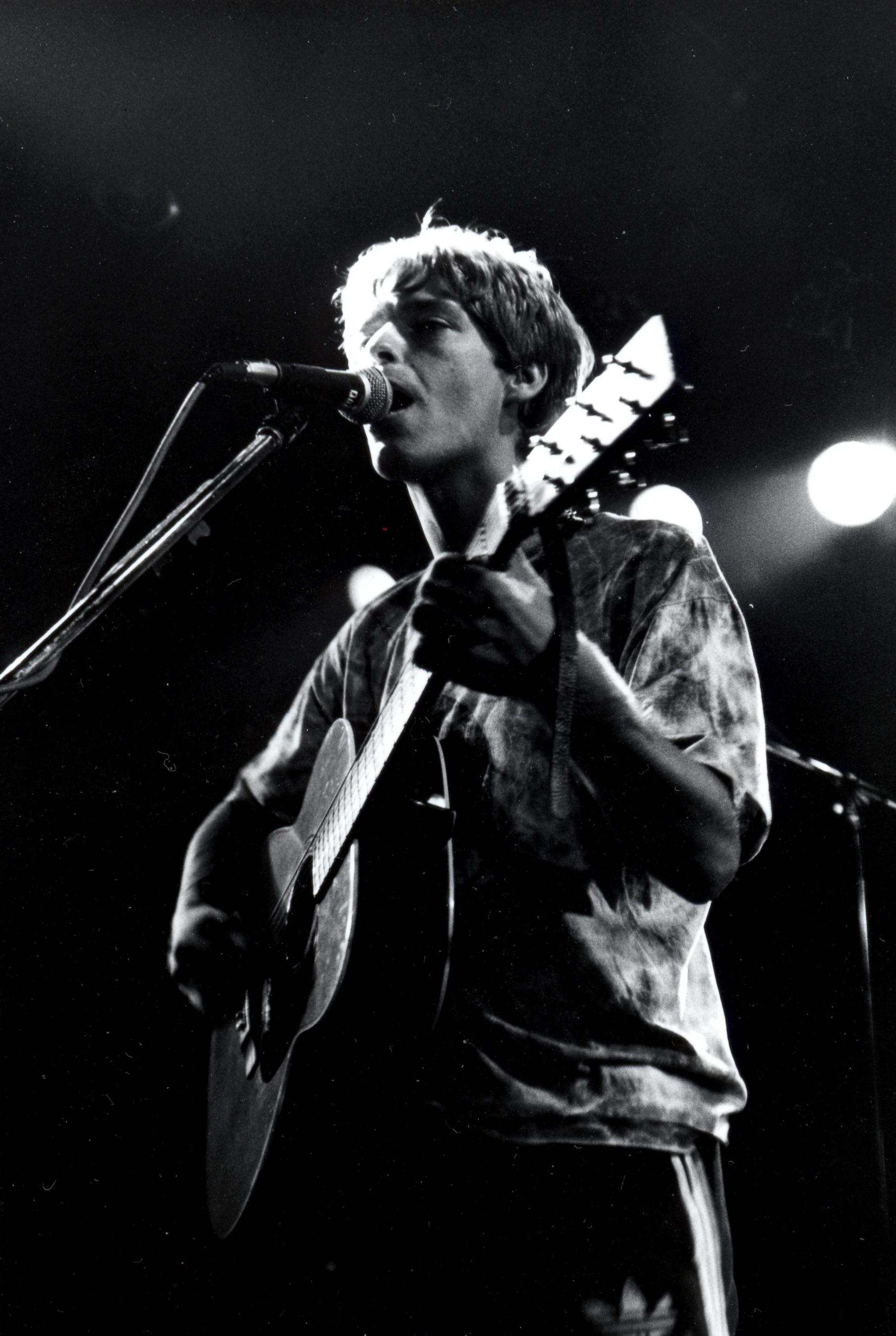
Mavers performing with the La's, Club Quatro, Japan 1991

More silence in the music press followed, aside from one 1995 NME interview. Mavers was at this point occasionally playing with other Liverpool musicians. Mavers disavowed the album in print while struggling to maintain his artistic integrity.

In late 2003 a book about Mavers and his band was released, In Search of the La's: A Secret Liverpool. In this book the author tracked down Mavers, via connections, to his home in Liverpool. The book culminated in a rare interview with Mavers discussing his band and what he intends to do with his music. While providing insight into Mavers' personality, the book ends on an ambiguous note concerning his return to music.

In March 2005 the La's announced dates in Britain and Ireland, their first in a decade, along with festivals sets such as Glastonbury and the Summer Sonic festival in Japan, with the line-up of Lee Mavers (vocals, guitar), John Power (bass), Jay Lewis of the band Cracatilla (guitar) and Nick Miniski (drums). The set generally consisted of old songs, including the perennial favourite "There She Goes", with new songs performed as encores. The drummer was quickly replaced by Mavers' old schoolfriend Ian Jasper, and live reviews have generally been favourable. New songs that would have featured, or will feature, on the 2nd album include "I Am the Key", "Fishing Net" A.K.A. "Something I Said", "Raindance" and "The Human Race".

In March 2009, Mavers made a surprise appearance in Birmingham, joining Pete Doherty on stage to play "Son of a Gun" and "There She Goes".

On 19 June 2011, Mavers made a rare outing, doing a secret acoustic set at the Deaf Institute, Manchester, under the name of Lee Rude & the Velcro Underpants (a play on Lou Reed and the Velvet Underground): this featured Mavers playing with Gary Murphy of defunct Liverpool band the Bandits. Mavers and Murphy continued impromptu gigs in Sunderland, Glasgow and London, before heading abroad to Amsterdam and later to the Rock En Seine Festival in Paris and at UK festivals Kendal Calling and Bestival, before bringing the 'stripped back' sets to a close at a homecoming show at Liverpool's O2 Academy after announcing they were set to return soon after recruiting a full band.

An interview with Mavers also appears in the 2013 book, Isle of Noises: Conversations with Great British Songwriters (Picador), by Daniel Rachel. Within the conversation, Mavers discussed the themes of certain songs and his songwriting craft (essentially describing himself as a conduit rather than author), and again decried the sole album released by the La's.

On September 29, 2024 Lee Mavers (with band) performed at Vanishing Point Records in Chesterfield, Derbyshire in a straight to vinyl event with Groovefarm Analog Recording Studios.

== Personal life ==
Mavers is an avid supporter of Everton Football Club and regularly attended Goodison Park. Mavers is now a regular at the club's new home Hill Dickinson Stadium.

He is the older brother of actor Gary Mavers and Neil Mavers, who was the drummer for the La's.

== Legacy ==
"Mavers is now considered by many to be one of pop's great "lost" figures. Over the last three decades, he has steadfastly refused to release any of the songs he's written. Since 1991, Mavers has played just 20 official concerts, the last of which was nearly 10 years ago. His public appearances are so scarce that for some journalists, tracking him down became a holy grail: Matthew Macefield wrote an entire book, 2003's A Secret Liverpool: In Search of The La's, dedicated to his four-year quest to get an audience with Mavers, which he eventually did at his Liverpool home. His enigmatic nature is one reason why, with rock music currently lacking truly maverick figures, Mavers still holds the imagination of not just fans, but the press and industry at large."

— Shaun Curran writing for the BBC, The mystery of 'lost' rock genius Lee Mavers, 17 March 2021.
