= List of songs recorded by Ian McNabb =

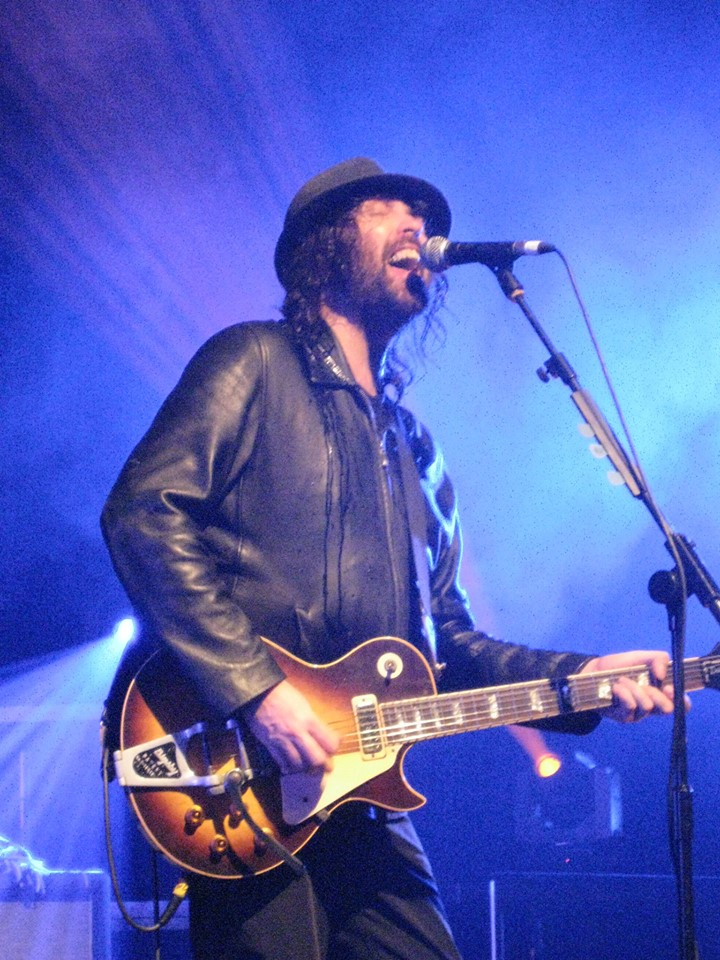
Ian McNabb is an English singer-songwriter and musician from Liverpool, England. He has led a critically acclaimed solo career since 1991, following his work as lead singer of The Icicle Works in the 1980s.

This is a list of commercially released studio recordings from the solo career of ex-Icicle Works front-man, Ian McNabb.

A song has to contain vocals by McNabb to qualify for inclusion on this list.

== Albums ==
- Truth and Beauty
- Head Like a Rock
- Merseybeast
- A Party Political Broadcast on Behalf of the Emotional Party
- Ian McNabb
- The Gentleman Adventurer
- Before All of This
- Great Things
- Little Episodes
- Eclectic Warrior
- Star Smile Strong
- Our Future in Space

== Songs ==
Song title	Appears on	Writer	Classification (Highest)	Year (First Released)	Notes
A Guy Like Me (And a Girl Like You)	October '96 Demos; A Party Political Broadcast on Behalf of the Emotional Party; Krugerrands	R.I.McNabb	Album Track	1997	
A Heart That You Can Borrow	Little Episodes	R.I.McNabb	Album Track	2012	
A Pirate Looks At Forty	I'm Game (All versions); Truth & Beauty (2013 Re-release)	Jimmy Buffett	B-side	1993	Cover of a song by Jimmy Buffett
A Secret Everybody Knows	Our Future in Space	R.I.McNabb	Album Track	2018	Originally released as a live track on the 2008 album How We Live: At the Philharmonic
Abigail Rain	Little Episodes	R.I.McNabb	Album Track	2012	
The Absentee	People Don't Stop Believin	R.I.McNabb	Album Track	2005	
Absolutely Wrong	A Party Political Broadcast on Behalf of the Emotional Party	R.I.McNabb	Album Track	1998	
Affirmation	Merseybeast	R.I.McNabb	Album Track	1996	
Ain't No Way to Behave	The Gentleman Adventurer; Radio Sessions Volume 1; Krugerrands	R.I.McNabb	Album Track	2002	
All About a Woman	Great Things; Krugerrands	R.I.McNabb	Album Track	2009	
All Along the Watchtower	Radio Sessions Volume 1	Bob Dylan	Radio Session	2011	Cover of a Bob Dylan song
All I've Got to Do (Feat. Thomas McConnell)	We're With The Beatles (Free CD from August 2013 issue of Mojo magazine)	John Lennon	Appears on 'Various Artists' album	2013	Cover of a Beatles song. Outro includes an interpolation of the John Lennon song Nobody Told Me
All Things to Everyone	The Gentleman Adventurer; Potency; Radio Sessions Volume 1	R.I.McNabb	Album Track	2002	
Alright with Me	October '96 Demos; Batman	R.I.McNabb	Album Track	1997	
An Honest Mistake	The Gentleman Adventurer	R.I.McNabb	Album Track	2002	
Ancient Energy	Little Episodes	R.I.McNabb	Album Track	2012	
Aquamarine	Our Future in Space	Peter Buck and R.I.McNabb	Album Track	2018	
As a Life Goes By	Head Like a Rock	R.I.McNabb	Album Track	1994	
Available Light	Merseybeast; Boots	R.I.McNabb	Album Track	1996	
Baltimore	Respectfully Yours	Randy Newman	Album Track	2016	Cover of a song by Randy Newman
Beautiful Old Mystery	Merseybeast; Little Princess; Boots	R.I.McNabb	Album Track	1996	
Before All of This	Before All of This; Radio Sessions Volume 1	R.I.McNabb	Album Track	2005	
Believer of Me	Krugerrands	R.I.McNabb	Album Track	2015	Originally released as a live track on the 2008 album How We Live: At the Philharmonic
Bloom	A Party Political Broadcast on Behalf of the Emotional Party	R.I.McNabb	Album Track	1998	
Camaraderie	Merseybeast; My Own Way; Waifs & Strays; Potency	R.I.McNabb	Album Track	1996	
Can't Get What I Want	Star Smile Strong	R.I.McNabb	Album Track	2017	
Caroline, No	Great Dreams of Heaven (CD & 12" Record; 1993); Truth & Beauty (2013 Re-release)	Brian Wilson & Tony Asher	B-side	1993	Cover of a song by The Beach Boys
Changes	Respectfully Yours	Ozzy Osbourne, Tony Iommi, Geezer Butler, Bill Ward	Album Track	2016	Cover of a song by Black Sabbath
Child Inside a Father	Head Like a Rock; My Own Way	R.I.McNabb	Album Track	1994	
Clarabella (Come To The Window)	Star Smile Strong	R.I.McNabb	Album Track	2017	
The Crystal Ship	Respectfully Yours	Jim Morrison	Album Track	2016	Cover of a song by The Doors
Don't Patronize Me	Don't Put Your Spell on Me (All versions); Boots; Potency	R.I.McNabb	B-side	1996	
Don't Put Your Spell on Me	Don't Put Your Spell on Me (All versions); Merseybeast	R.I.McNabb	Single	1996	
Empire's End	Great Things	R.I.McNabb & Ciaron Bell	Album Track	2009	
Enabler	Star Smile Strong	R.I.McNabb	Album Track	2017	
Fast Approaching Land	Eclectic Warrior	R.I.McNabb	Album Track	2013	
Finally Getting Over You	Before All of This; People Don't Stop Believin; Radio Sessions Volume 1	R.I.McNabb	Album Track	2005	
Fire Inside My Soul	Head Like a Rock; Waifs & Strays	R.I.McNabb	Album Track	1994	
For You, Angel	(I Go) My Own Way (CD & 10" Record); Go into the Light (12" Record); My Own Way; Potency; Truth & Beauty (2013 Re-release)	R.I.McNabb	B-side	1993	
Friend of My Enemy	Batman; Boots; Potency	R.I.McNabb	Album Track	2001	
Gak Mummy No.1	Waifs & Strays	R.I.McNabb	Demo	2001	
German Soldier's Helmet Circa 1943	The Gentleman Adventurer; Potency	R.I.McNabb	Album Track	2002	
Girls Are Birds	A Party Political Broadcast on Behalf of the Emotional Party	R.I.McNabb	Album Track	1998	
Girls from Across the Water	Our Future in Space	R.I.McNabb	Album Track	2018	
Glory Be	October '96 Demos; Boots	R.I.McNabb	Album Track	1997	
Go Into the Light	Head Like a Rock; Go into the Light (All Versions); Potency	R.I.McNabb	Single	1994	
Gravy	Krugerrands	R.I.McNabb	Album Track	2015	
Great Dreams of Heaven	Great Dreams of Heaven (All versions); These Are the Days (CD and 12" Record); If Love Was Like Guitars (CD); Truth & Beauty; My Own Way; Waifs & Strays; Potency; Radio Sessions Volume 1	R.I.McNabb	Single	1991	
Great Things	Great Things	R.I.McNabb	Album Track	2009	
Growing Younger	Boots	R.I.McNabb	Demo	2003	
Gulf Coast Rockin'	The Gentleman Adventurer; Krugerrands	R.I.McNabb	Album Track	2002	
Happier with Him?	Radio Sessions Volume 1	Bill Withers	Radio Session	2011	Cover of the song 'Hope She'll Be Happier' by Bill Withers
He Wrote Himself a Letter	Little Episodes	R.I.McNabb	Album Track	2012	
Heydays	Merseybeast; Boots	R.I.McNabb	Album Track	1996	
High on a Hill	Little Episodes; Krugerrands	R.I.McNabb	Album Track	2012	
Hollow Horse	Radio Sessions Volume 1	R.I.McNabb & C. Layhe	Radio Session	2011	Originally released by The Icicle Works
Hollywood Tears (Featuring Liam McKahey)	Batman; Boots	R.I.McNabb	Album Track	2001	
Hotel Stationary	Batman	R.I.McNabb	Album Track	2001	
Hotter Than the Sun	Star Smile Strong	R.I.McNabb, Alex Harvey, Zal Cleminson, Tommy Eyre	Album Track	2017	
How She Moves	Star Smile Strong	R.I.McNabb	Album Track	2017	
The House Always Wins	Eclectic Warrior	R.I.McNabb	Album Track	2013	
The Human Heart and How It Works	The Gentleman Adventurer	R.I.McNabb	Album Track	2002	
Hurricane Elaine	The Gentleman Adventurer; Krugerrands	R.I.McNabb	Album Track	2002	
I Can See Tomorrow	Our Future in Space	R.I.McNabb	Album Track	2018	
I Can't Help It If I'm Great	Great Things	R.I.McNabb	Album Track	2009	
I Stood Before St. Peter	Go into the Light (CD); Head Like a Rock (2012 Re-release); Krugerrands	R.I.McNabb	B-side	1994	Originally released by The Icicle Works
(I Go) My Own Way	Truth & Beauty; (I Go) My Own Way (All versions); My Own Way; Potency	R.I.McNabb	Single	1993	
(I Just Wanna) Rock 'N' Roll My Life Away	Eclectic Warrior	R.I.McNabb	Album Track	2013	
I Kinda Like It Without You	Star Smile Strong	R.I.McNabb	Album Track	2017	
(I Wish I Was In) California	Batman	R.I.McNabb	Album Track	2001	
If Love Was Like Guitars	If Love Was Like Guitars (All versions); Truth & Beauty; My Own Way; Potency	R.I.McNabb	Single	1993	
If My Daddy Could See Me Now	(I Go) My Own Way (CD & 10" Record); Potency; Truth & Beauty (2013 Re-release)	R.I.McNabb	B-side	1993	
(If We Believe) What Love Can Do	October '96 Demos; Batman	R.I.McNabb	Album Track	1997	
I'm a Genius	Merseybeast; My Own Way; Waifs & Strays; Potency	R.I.McNabb	Album Track	1996	
I'm Game	Great Dreams of Heaven (CD & 12" Record; 1993); Truth & Beauty; I'm Game (All versions)	R.I.McNabb	Album Track	1993	
Irresistible Ruins	Little Episodes	R.I.McNabb	Album Track	2012	
Keeping Your Love Alive	Before All of This	R.I.McNabb	Album Track	2005	
The Killing Moon	Respectfully Yours	Will Sergeant, Ian McCulloch, Les Pattinson, Pete de Freitas	Album Track	2016	Cover of a song by Echo & the Bunnymen
King of Hearts	Little Episodes	R.I.McNabb	Album Track	2012	
Lady by Degrees	The Gentleman Adventurer; Potency	R.I.McNabb	Album Track	2002	
Lazy Water	Star Smile Strong	R.I.McNabb	Album Track	2017	
Let the Young Girl Do What She Wants To	Let The Young Girl Do What She Wants To (All versions); Before All of This; People Don't Stop Believin	R.I.McNabb	Single	2005	
Let's Go All the Way	Krugerrands	Gary "Mudbone" Cooper	Album Track	2015	Cover of a Sly Fox song
Life on Mars?	Respectfully Yours	David Bowie	Album Track	2016	Cover of a song by David Bowie
Little Bit of Magic	Merseybeast	R.I.McNabb	Album Track	1996	
Little Episodes	Little Episodes	R.I.McNabb	Album Track	2012	
Little Princess	A Party Political Broadcast on Behalf of the Emotional Party; Little Princess; Krugerrands	R.I.McNabb	Single	1998	
Liverpool Girl	October '96 Demos; A Party Political Broadcast on Behalf of the Emotional Party; Batman; Boots; Potency	R.I.McNabb	Album Track	1997	
Livin' Proof (Miracles Can Happen)	Batman; Livin' Proof (Miracles Can Happen) (Promotional single); Potency	R.I.McNabb	Single (Promotional)	2001	
The Lonely Ones	Before All of This; People Don't Stop Believin	R.I.McNabb	Album Track	2005	
Love, Where Are You?	Boots	R.I.McNabb	Demo	2003	
Love Is a Wonderful Colour	You Must Be Prepared to Dream (Disc 2); Radio Sessions Volume 1; Head Like a Rock (2012 Re-release)	R.I.McNabb	B-side	1994	Originally released by The Icicle Works
Loveless Age	A Party Political Broadcast on Behalf of the Emotional Party; Little Princess; Waifs & Strays	R.I.McNabb	Album Track	1998	
Lovers at the End of Time	Before All of This	R.I.McNabb	Album Track	2005	
Love's Young Dream	Merseybeast; Boots	R.I.McNabb	Album Track	1996	
Make Love to You	Great Dreams of Heaven (CD & 12" Record; 1991); Truth & Beauty	R.I.McNabb	Album Track	1991	
Makin' Silver Sing	Our Future in Space	R.I.McNabb	Album Track	2018	
The Man Who Can Make a Woman Laugh	A Party Political Broadcast on Behalf of the Emotional Party; Potency	R.I.McNabb	Album Track	1998	
May and December	The Gentleman Adventurer	R.I.McNabb	Album Track	2002	
May You Always	Head Like a Rock; Boots	R.I.McNabb	Album Track	1994	
Me and the Devil	Waifs & Strays	R.I.McNabb	Demo	2001	
Medicated Emma	Our Future in Space	R.I.McNabb	Album Track	2018	
Memory Be Good to Me, Memory Come Back to Me	Eclectic Warrior	R.I.McNabb	Album Track	2013	
Memory Motel	Respectfully Yours	Jagger/Richards	Album Track	2016	Cover of a song by The Rolling Stones
Merseybeast	Merseybeast; Merseybeast (Single) (All Versions); Boots; Potency	R.I.McNabb	Single	1996	
Message from the Country	Let the Young Girl Do What She Wants To (CD & Digital Download); People Don't Stop Believin	R.I.McNabb	Album Track	2005	
Misty Meadows	Waifs & Strays; Krugerrands	R.I.McNabb	Album Track	2001	
Moment in the Sun	Batman	R.I.McNabb	Album Track	2001	
Montague Terrace (In Blue)	Radio Sessions Volume 1; Respectfully Yours	Noel Scott Engel	Album Track	2011	Cover of a song by Scott Walker
Music Is Love	Music Is Love- A Singer-Songwriters' Tribute To The Music Of Crosby, Stills, Nash & Young	David Crosby, Graham Nash, Neil Young	Appears on 'Various Artists' album	2013	Cover of a song by Crosby, Stills & Nash
My Accuser	Our Future in Space	R.I.McNabb	Album Track	2018	
My Life to Live Again	Eclectic Warrior	R.I.McNabb	Album Track	2013	
Mystic Age (Feat. Prof. Brian Cox)	Star Smile Strong	R.I.McNabb	Album Track	2017	
The New Golden Age	Waifs & Strays	R.I.McNabb	Demo	2001	
New Light	New Light (Promotional single); Great Things; Radio Sessions Volume 1	R.I.McNabb	Single (Promotional)	2009	
The New Me	Before All of This; People Don't Stop Believin	R.I.McNabb	Album Track	2005	
The Nicest Kind of Lie	Before All of This; People Don't Stop Believin	R.I.McNabb	Album Track	2005	
No Hero to Me	Eclectic Warrior	R.I.McNabb	Album Track	2013	
Noone Counts for Money (Smiley Feat. Ian McNabb)	Smiley's Friends Eclectic	Smiley & Graham Turner	Album Track	2017	
Nobody Say Nothin' to No One	Waifs & Strays	R.I.McNabb	Demo	2001	
Not Lost Enough to Be Rescued	Waifs & Strays	R.I.McNabb	Demo	2001	
Nothin' but Time	The Gentleman Adventurer	R.I.McNabb	Album Track	2002	
Nothin' Less Than the Very Best	Batman	R.I.McNabb	Album Track	2001	
Only Children	Little Episodes	R.I.McNabb	Album Track	2012	
Open Air	Batman	R.I.McNabb	Album Track	2001	
Other People	The Gentleman Adventurer	R.I.McNabb	Album Track	2002	
Our Friend (As a member of Liverpudlian ensemble The Eppy Centre)	Statue for Eppy	Bob Pitt	Single	2015	Charity single in support of the 'Statue 4 Eppy' appeal
Our Future in Space	Our Future in Space	R.I.McNabb	Album Track	2018	
Out of Season	Little Princess; Radio Sessions Volume 1	R.I.McNabb	B-side	1999	Originally released by The Icicle Works
Pampered Pop Star Millionaire Miserabilist Blues	The Gentleman Adventurer	R.I.McNabb	Album Track	2002	
People Don't Stop Believin'	People Don't Stop Believin	R.I.McNabb	Album Track	2005	
Permanent Damage	Merseybeast (Single) (Disc 1)	R.I.McNabb	B-side	1996	Originally released by The Icicle Works
Phyllis the Parking Meter Lady (Joseph Bridge Feat. Ian McNabb)	Joseph Bridge (album)	Joseph Bridge	Single	2014	
Picture of the Moon	Before All of This; People Don't Stop Believin	R.I.McNabb	Album Track	2005	
Pinin'	Great Things	R.I.McNabb	Album Track	2009	
Play the Hand They Deal You	(I Go) My Own Way (All versions); Potency; Truth & Beauty (2013 Re-release)	R.I.McNabb	B-side	1993	
Pocahontas	Respectfully Yours	Neil Young	Album Track	2016	Cover of a song by Neil Young
Potency	Head Like a Rock; My Own Way; Potency	R.I.McNabb	Album Track	1994	
Power of Song	Great Dreams of Heaven (CD & 12" Record; 1991)	R.I.McNabb	B-side	1991	
Presence of the One	Truth & Beauty	R.I.McNabb	Album Track	1993	
Pretty Boys with Big Guitars	Merseybeast (Single) (Disc 2)	R.I.McNabb	B-side	1996	
The Prize	The Gentleman Adventurer	R.I.McNabb	Album Track	2002	
Reeperbahn	Our Future in Space	R.I.McNabb	Album Track	2018	
Rider (The Heartless Mare)	Before All of This; Krugerrands	R.I.McNabb	Album Track	2005	
Right on Time	Boots; Eclectic Warrior	R.I.McNabb	Album Track	2003	
Rock	Go into the Light (CD); Potency; Head Like a Rock (2012 Re-release)	R.I.McNabb	B-side	1994	
Rockin' for Jesus	Batman	R.I.McNabb	Album Track	2001	
Rollin' On [The Things We Gave Away]	Boots	R.I.McNabb	Demo	2003	
Run to Me	Respectfully Yours	Barry, Robin & Maurice Gibb	Album Track	2016	Cover of a song by the Bee Gees
Sad Strange Solitary Catholic Mystic	Head Like a Rock; My Own Way	R.I.McNabb	Album Track	1994	
Salt of the Earth (Featuring Mike Scott & Anthony Thistlethwaite)	21 Beggars Banquet; Potency	Mick Jagger & Keith Richards	Appears on 'Various Artists' album	1998	Cover of a song by The Rolling Stones
Sex with Someone You Love	A Party Political Broadcast on Behalf of the Emotional Party	R.I.McNabb	Album Track	1998	
She Don't Let Nobody	She Don't Let Nobody (Promotional single); Eclectic Warrior	R.I.McNabb	Album Track	2011	
Sing	Boots	R.I.McNabb	Demo	2003	
The Slider	Merseybeast (Single) (Disc 2); Potency	Marc Bolan	B-side	1996	Cover of a song by T. Rex
Slough	Words/Music – Sir John Betjeman and Mike Read	John Betjeman	Appears on 'Various Artists' album	1990	Musical Adaptation of a poem by Sir John Betjeman. Miscredited as 'Ian MacNabb'
Smirtin'	Eclectic Warrior	R.I.McNabb	Album Track	2013	
Snaked	Merseybeast (Single) (Disc 2)	R.I.McNabb	B-side	1996	
Somebody Tell Rebecca	Boots	R.I.McNabb	Demo	2003	
Something Wonderful	Boots	R.I.McNabb	Demo	2003	
Sometimes I Think About You	Still Got The Fever (Promotional single); You Must Be Prepared to Dream (Disc 1 and 12" Record); Potency; Head Like a Rock (2012 Re-release)	R.I.McNabb	B-side	1993	
Still Got the Fever	Still Got the Fever (Promotional single); Head Like a Rock	R.I.McNabb	Single (Promotional)	1993	
Stormchaser	Great Things	R.I.McNabb	Album Track	2009	
Story of My Life	Truth & Beauty	R.I.McNabb	Album Track	1993	
Supermoon	Our Future in Space	R.I.McNabb	Album Track	2018	
That's Why I Believe	Great Dreams of Heaven (7" Record, CD & 12" Record; 1991); Truth & Beauty; My Own Way	R.I.McNabb	Album Track	1991	
That's Why the Darkness Exists (Feat. Zak Starkey)	You Must Be Prepared to Dream (Cassette); Head Like a Rock (2012 Re-release)	R.I.McNabb	B-side	1994	
The Day That I Learned to Say No	Our Future in Space	R.I.McNabb	Album Track	2018	
The Things You Do	The Gentleman Adventurer	R.I.McNabb	Album Track	2002	
There Oughta Be a Law	Before All of This; Radio Sessions Volume 1	R.I.McNabb	Album Track	2005	
These Are the Days	These Are the Days (All versions); Truth & Beauty; My Own Way; Boots	R.I.McNabb	Album Track	1991	
They Couldn't Hear the Music	Eclectic Warrior	R.I.McNabb	Album Track	2013	
They Settled for Less Than They Wanted	Merseybeast	R.I.McNabb	Album Track	1996	
They Shoot Horses Don't They?	Let The Young Girl Do What She Wants To (CD & Digital Download); People Don't Stop Believin	Gareth Mortimer	Album Track	2005	Cover of a song by Racing Cars
They Will Find You Out	Let The Young Girl Do What She Wants To (7" Record); People Don't Stop Believin; Radio Sessions Volume 1	R.I.McNabb	Album Track	2005	
This Love	Great Things	R.I.McNabb	Album Track	2009	
This Love I Feel for You	Star Smile Strong	R.I.McNabb, Ralph Molina	Album Track	2017	
This Time Is Forever	Head Like a Rock	R.I.McNabb	Album Track	1994	
Throw the Rest Away	Our Future in Space	R.I.McNabb	Album Track	2018	
Time Ain't Nothin'	Respectfully Yours	Green on Red	Album Track	2016	Cover of a song by Green on Red
Time of My Time	Waifs & Strays	R.I.McNabb	Demo	2001	
Time You Were in Love	Go into the Light (Numbered 12" Record & Cassette); Potency; Head Like a Rock (2012 Re-release)	R.I.McNabb	B-side	1994	
Tiny Arrows	Little Episodes	R.I.McNabb	Album Track	2012	
To Love and to Let Go	Little Episodes	R.I.McNabb	Album Track	2012	
Too Close to the Sun	Merseybeast	R.I.McNabb	Album Track	1996	
Toxic	Our Future in Space	Cathy Dennis, Christian Karlsson, Pontus Winnberg and Henrik Jonback	Album Track	2018	Cover of a Britney Spears song
Trams in Amsterdam	These Are the Days (All versions); If Love Was Like Guitars (All versions); Potency; Truth & Beauty (2013 Re-release)	R.I.McNabb	B-side	1991	
Trip with Me	Truth & Beauty	R.I.McNabb	Album Track	1993	
Truth and Beauty	Truth & Beauty	R.I.McNabb	Album Track	1993	
Unfinished Business in London Town [For Lee]	Before All of This	R.I.McNabb	Album Track	2005	
Unknown Legend	Great Dreams of Heaven (7" Record, Cassette, 12" Record & CD; 1993); Truth & Beauty (2013 Re-release)	Neil Young	B-side	1993	Cover of a song by Neil Young
Up Here in the North of England	Merseybeast (Single) (Disc 1 & 7" Record)	R.I.McNabb	B-side	1996	Originally released by The Icicle Works
Vodka Rivers and Cigarette Trees	Our Future in Space	R.I.McNabb	Album Track	2018	
Waitin' for a Streetcar	Star Smile Strong	R.I.McNabb	Album Track	2017	
Wanna Change My Plea to Guilty	Star Smile Strong	R.I.McNabb	Album Track	2017	
Western Eyes	Before All of This	R.I.McNabb	Album Track	2005	
What You Wanted	Batman	R.I.McNabb	Album Track	2001	
Whatever It Takes	Batman	R.I.McNabb	Album Track	2001	
What She Did to My Mind	Don't Put Your Spell on Me (All versions)	R.I.McNabb	B-side	1996	Originally released by The Icicle Works
What's It All About	I'm Game (CD); Potency; Truth & Beauty (2013 Re-release)	R.I.McNabb	B-side	1993	
When It All Comes Down	You Must Be Prepared to Dream (Disc 2); Head Like a Rock (2012 Re-release)	R.I.McNabb	B-side	1994	Originally released by The Icicle Works
Why Are the Beautiful So Sad?	Waifs & Strays	R.I.McNabb	Demo	2001	
Woman	Liverpool – The Number Ones Album	John Lennon	Appears on 'Various Artists' album	2008	Cover of a song by John Lennon
Woman Killed by Falling Tree	Eclectic Warrior	R.I.McNabb	Album Track	2013	
Women Love a Bastard (Men Love A Bitch)	Star Smile Strong	R.I.McNabb	Album Track	2017	
Won't Get Fooled Again	Boots	Pete Townshend	Demo	2003	Cover of a song by The Who
Woo Yer	You Must Be Prepared to Dream (Disc 1 and 12" Record); Potency; Head Like a Rock (2012 Re-release)	R.I.McNabb	B-side	1994	
Working Class Hero	Het Beste Uit 10 Jaar- Meter Sessies 2	John Lennon	Appears on 'Various Artists' album	1997	Cover of a song by John Lennon
You Must Be Prepared to Dream	You Must Be Prepared to Dream (All versions); Head Like a Rock; My Own Way; Boots; Potency	R.I.McNabb	Single	1994	
You Only Get What You Deserve	October '96 Demos; A Party Political Broadcast on Behalf of the Emotional Party; Boots	R.I.McNabb	Album Track	1997	
You Stone My Soul	Merseybeast; My Own Way; Waifs & Strays; Potency	R.I.McNabb	Album Track	1996	
