= Ian McNabb discography =

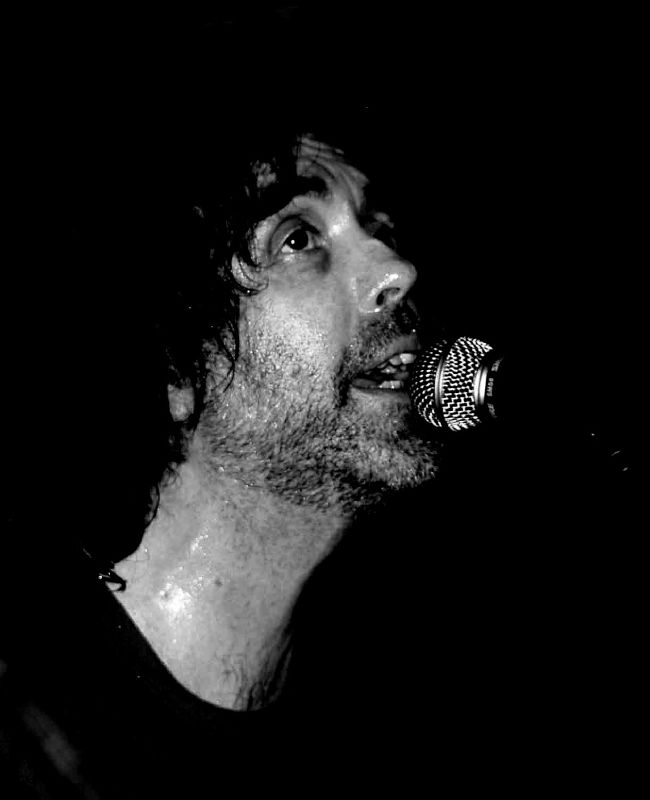
- Studio albums: 11
- Compilation albums: 2
- Singles: 11
- Promotional singles: 4
- Other appearances: 13
- Side albums: 5
- Live albums: 2

Robert Ian McNabb is an English singer-songwriter and musician from Liverpool, England. Although known best for his work as leader and songwriter-in-chief of The Icicle Works in the 1980s, he has also led a critically acclaimed solo career. This article documents his solo releases, followed by a more detailed description of a selection of his releases.

== Albums ==
| Year | Album | Peak chart positions |
| Year | Album | UK |
|---|---|---|
| 1993 | Truth and Beauty: Released: 18 January 1993; Label: This Way Up (5143782) | 51 |
| 1994 | Head Like a Rock: Released: 4 July 1994; Label: This Way Up (5222982) | 29 |
| 1996 | Merseybeast: Released: May 1996; Label: This Way Up (5242152) | 30 |
| 1998 | A Party Political Broadcast on Behalf of the Emotional Party: Released: 26 October 1998; Label: Fairfield (FAIR CD1) | 162 |
| 2001 | Ian McNabb: Released: 2 April 2001; Label: Sanctuary (SANCD011) | 185 |
| 2002 | The Gentleman Adventurer: Released: September 2002; Label: Fairfield (FAIR CD3) | – |
| 2005 | Before All of This: Released: 30 May 2005; Label: Fairfield (FAIR CD6) | – |
| 2009 | Great Things: Released: 27 September 2009; Label: Fairfield (FAIR CD9) | – |
| 2012 | Little Episodes: Released: 20 February 2012; Label: Fairfield (FAIR CD10) | – |
| 2013 | Eclectic Warrior: Released: 18 March 2013; Label: Fairfield (FAIR CD11) | – |
| 2017 | Star Smile Strong: Released: 20 April 2017; Label: Fairfield (FAIR CD15) | – |
| 2018 | Our Future in Space: Released: 30 June 2018; Label: Fairfield (FAIR CD16) | – |
| 2021 | Utopian: Released: 2 April 2021; Label: Fairfield (FAIR CD17) | – |

== Side albums ==
- Waifs and Strays (2001)
- Boots (2003)
- People Don't Stop Believin' (2005)
- Krugerrands (2015)
- Respectfully Yours (2016)

== Compilation albums ==
- My Own Way: The Words & Music of Ian McNabb (1997)
- Potency: The Best of Ian McNabb (2004)

== Live albums ==
- Live at Life (2000)
- How We Live: At the Philharmonic (2007)

== Singles ==
| Year | Single | Peak chart positions | Album |
| Year | Single | UK | Album |
|---|---|---|---|
| 1991 | "Great Dreams of Heaven" | – | Truth and Beauty |
| 1991 | "These Are the Days" | – | Truth and Beauty |
| 1992 | "If Love Was Like Guitars" | 67 | Truth and Beauty |
| 1993 | "I'm Game" | 98 | Truth and Beauty |
| 1993 | "(I Go) My Own Way" | 94 | Truth and Beauty |
| 1994 | "You Must Be Prepared to Dream" | 54 | Head Like a Rock |
| 1994 | "Go into the Light" | 66 | Head Like a Rock |
| 1996 | "Don't Put Your Spell on Me" | 72 | Merseybeast |
| 1996 | "Merseybeast" | 74 | Merseybeast |
| 1999 | "Little Princess" | – | A Party Political Broadcast on Behalf of the Emotional Party |
| 2005 | "Let The Young Girl Do What She Wants To" | 38 | Before All of This |

== Promotional singles ==
- ″Still Got the Fever″ from the album Head Like a Rock (Autumn 1993)
- ″Livin' Proof (Miracles Can Happen)″ from the album Ian McNabb (April 2001)
- ″New Light″ from the album Great Things (released digitally on iTunes) (2009)
- ″She Don't Let Nobody″, later included on the album Eclectic Warrior (2011)

== Other appearances ==
=== Songs ===
- ″Slough″ from Words/Music – Sir John Betjeman and Mike Read (2006)
- ″Working Class Hero″ (cover of a John Lennon song) from the Dutch CD Het beste uit 10 jaar 2 meter sessies (1997)
- ″Woman″ (cover of a John Lennon song) from Liverpool – The Number Ones Album (2008)
- ″Music Is Love″ (cover of a David Crosby song) from the free CD with the Jan/Feb 2013 issue of Maverick magazine
- ″All I've Got to Do″ (cover of a Beatles song) from the free CD with the August 2013 issue of Mojo magazine with Thomas McConnell

=== Albums ===
- Space Flower with The Wild Swans (Guitar and Backing Vocals)
- Cloudcuckooland, Sense, and Jollification with The Lightning Seeds (Backing vocals, Co-writer of Sense and Jollification). (1990–1994)
- The Journey (2005) with Amsterdam (Guitar only)
- Songs for Everyday Use (2006) with Gary Cooke. (Guitar only)
- Ian was part of the short lived ensemble band Sandhill Mob (2010)
- Hold On (Charity single for Alder Hay children's hospital) (2012) (Guitar and Backing Vocals)
- Rude Beggar (2014) with Nash Albert. (Producer (with Ciaron Bell), Guitar, Backing Vocals)
- Our Friend (Charity single as part of ensemble, released in support of 'Statue 4 Eppy') (2015)

== Featured works ==
=== ″I'm Game″ ===
"I'm Game"

Single by Ian McNabb

from the album Truth and Beauty
- Released: June 1993
- Recorded: 1993
- Genre: Rock
- Label: This Way Up
- Songwriter: Robert Ian McNabb
- Producer: Robert Ian McNabb

Ian McNabb singles chronology
| "If Love Was Like Guitars" (1993) | "I'm Game" (1993) | "(I Go) My Own Way" (1993) |

"I'm Game" is the fourth single released by McNabb after disbanding the Icicle Works. The song was the first to be released after publication of his first album Truth and Beauty, rather than to promote it. It failed to chart.

==== Track listing ====
7" Vinyl

1. ″I'm Game″ (4:32)
2. ″A Pirate Looks at Forty″ (4:09)

CD

1. ″I'm Game″ (4:32)
2. ″What's It All About?″ (4:25)
3. ″A Pirate Looks at Forty″ (4:09)

=== ″(I Go) My Own Way″ ===
"(I Go) My Own Way"

Single by Ian McNabb

from the album Truth and Beauty
- Released: September 1993
- Recorded: 1993
- Genre: Rock
- Label: This Way Up
- Songwriter: Robert Ian McNabb
- Producer: Robert Ian McNabb

Ian McNabb singles chronology
| "I'm Game" (1993) | "(I Go) My Own Way" (1993) | "You Must Be Prepared to Dream" (1994) |

"(I Go) My Own Way" is the fifth single released by McNabb after disbanding the Icicle Works. The song was the last to be released from McNabb's first album Truth and Beauty. It failed to chart.

==== Track listings ====
7" Vinyl and Cassette

1. ″(I Go) My Own Way″ (5:20)
2. ″Play The Hand They Deal You″ (5:38)

CD and 10" Vinyl

1. ″(I Go) My Own Way″ (5:20)
2. ″Play The Hand They Deal You″ (5:38)
3. ″If My Daddy Could See Me Now″ (3:06)
4. ″For You, Angel″ (7:46)

=== ″Little Princess″ ===
"Little Princess"

Single by Ian McNabb

from the album A Party Political Broadcast on Behalf of the Emotional Party
- Released: January 1999
- Recorded: 1998
- Genre: Rock
- Label: Fairfield Trading Co.
- Songwriter: Robert Ian McNabb
- Producer: Robert Ian McNabb

Ian McNabb singles chronology
| "Merseybeast" (1996) | "Little Princess" (1999) | "Let The Young Girl Do What She Wants To" (2005) |

"Little Princess" is the tenth single released by McNabb after disbanding the Icicle Works. The song was the sole single release from the album A Party Political Broadcast on Behalf of the Emotional Party. The single failed to chart on the official UK charts.

==== Critical reception ====
Paul Cole of the Birmingham Evening Mail called ″Little Princess″ "the single the fans asked for", saying, "rarely has McNabb been in better vocal form".

==== Track listings ====
1. ″Little Princess″ (3:46)
2. ″Beautiful Old Mystery″ (demo March 95) (4:15)
3. ″Loveless Age″ (demo October 96) (4:17)
4. ″Out of Season″ (June 98) (5:22)

=== Live at Life ===
Live at Life

Live album by Ian McNabb
- Released: June 2000
- Recorded: 1999
- Genre: Pop
- Label: Fairfield Records
- Producer: Robert Ian McNabb

Live at Life is McNabb's first live album. It was recorded from a pair of Christmas gigs at the Voodoo Room, Life Cafe, Liverpool in 1999, from which the album got its title. McNabb said he "couldn't resist doing a live album at a place called Life as [he] knew the title was brilliant". The album included one newly written track, "Why Are the Beautiful So Sad".

==== Critical reception ====
Rudyard Kennedy, writing for AllMusic said the album was "a well-thought-out, well-produced niche product" but that "featuring no hits and lacking the raw energy one normally associates with a live release – is probably the least-essential item in McNabb's catalog. Which is not to say that Live at Life is a bad album – just a curious one to put into general release".

==== Track listing ====
1. ″Hollow Horse″ [4:42]
2. ″Sex With Someone You Love″ [5:18]
3. ″Great Dreams of Heaven″ [4:54]
4. ″Permanent Damage″ [3:20]
5. ″Little Girl Lost″ [4:15]
6. ″I'm a Genius″ [4:13]
7. ″One True Love″ [2:44]
8. ″Why Are The Beautiful So Sad?″ [4:12]
9. ″When It All Comes Down″ [4:10]
10. ″A Guy Like Me (And A Girl Like You)″ [4:51]
11. ″Fire Inside My Soul″ [7:18]
12. ″What She Did to My Mind″ [6:41]
13. ″Merseybeast″ [6:02]
14. ″Camaraderie″ [4:31]
15. ″Reaping The Rich Harvest″ [4:25]

=== Potency: The Best of Ian McNabb ===
Potency: The Best of Ian McNabb

Greatest hits album by Ian McNabb
- Released: 2004
- Recorded: 1991–2004
- Genre: Pop
- Label: Fairfield Records
- Producer: Robert Ian McNabb

Potency: The Best of Ian McNabb is McNabb's second "Greatest Hits"-style compilation album. It came in a two-CD package along with Potency+, a compilation of "B-sides, remixes and rarities", according to the cover notes.

==== Critical reception ====
The magazine Uncut commented, "As Potency proves, over more than a decade [Ian McNabb has] been making quality pop characterised by lyrical maturity and an old-fashioned respect for melody", but gave the album a low rating of 3/10.

==== Track listing ====
Potency (Disc 1)

1. ″Liverpool Girl″
2. ″Camaraderie″
3. ″Livin' Proof (Miracles Can Happen)″
4. ″All Things To Everyone″
5. ″Great Dreams of Heaven″
6. ″Potency″
7. ″If Love Was Like Guitars″
8. ″Man Who Can Make A Woman Laugh″
9. ″You Must Be Prepared To Dream″
10. ″German Soldier's Helmet Circa 1943″
11. ″You Stone My Soul″
12. ″I'm A Genius″
13. ″Friend of My Enemy″
14. ″Lady By Degrees″
15. ″Merseybeast″

Potency+ (Disc 2)

1. ″Play The Hand They Deal You″
2. ″I Go My Own Way″
3. ″If My Daddy Could See Me Now″
4. ″For You Angel″
5. ″Time You Were in Love″
6. ″Don't Patronize Me″
7. ″Trams in Amsterdam″
8. ″Woo Yer″
9. ″Salt of the Earth″
10. ″Great Dreams of Heaven″
11. ″Rock″
12. ″Sometimes I Think About You″
13. ″What's It All About″
14. ″Slider″
15. ″Go into The Light (celestial dub mix)″

=== Boots ===
Boots

Compilation album by Ian McNabb
- Released: May 2003
- Recorded: 1991–2000
- Genre: Pop
- Label: OB
- Producer: Robert Ian McNabb

Boots is an album of previously unreleased archival material recorded between 1991 and 2000. The title refers to both McNabb's nickname (after his penchant for wearing Beatles-style boots in the mid-80s while with The Icicle Works) and the "official bootleg" nature of the release. The double disc set includes some radio performances, demos and alternative versions. It was available by mail only and limited to 1000, copies each numbered on the spine. According to McNabb, the album is "very rare". The cover was designed by Ged Doyle at Plast-c.

==== Critical reception ====
Jerry Ewing reviewed Boots in the magazine Classic Rock, saying it was "a double CD full of rarities and out-takes from across McNabb's excellent solo career". He concluded by saying it "is sad that Boots is available only from [...] McNabb's website".

==== Track listing ====
Disc 1

1. ″Merseybeast″ (demo w/original lyrics-March '95) [6:59]
2. ″Friend of My Enemy″ (demo-October '96) [5:07]
3. ″Beautiful Old Mystery″ (demo-March '95) [4:13]
4. ″You Must Be Prepared To Dream″ (acoustic radio session w/Crazy Horse-June '94)[5:26]
5. ″Sing″ (demo-March '95) [4:42]
6. ″You Only Get What You Deserve″ (demo-March '95) [4:33]
7. ″Liverpool Girl″ (demo w/original lyrics-October '96) [4:49]
8. ″Love's Young Dream″ (demo-March '95) [4:28]
9. ″Hollywood Tears″ (alternative vocal version-March '00) [4:10]
10. ″Rollin' On (The Things We Gave Away)″ (demo-February '99) [5:41]
11. ″Livin' Proof (Miracles Can Happen)″ (live-December '99) [3:20]
12. ″Glory Be″ (demo-October '96) [6:16]

Disc 2

1. ″Heydays″ (demo-March '95) [5:44]
2. ″Right on Time″ (demo-October '96) [3:58]
3. ″Growing Younger″ (demo-March '95) [5:17]
4. ″May You Always″ (home demo-August '93) [5:01]
5. ″Somebody Tell Rebecca″ (outtake-September '01) [4:15]
6. ″Something Wonderful″ (demo-January '00) [4:44]
7. ″These Are The Days″ (acoustic radio session w/Crazy Horse-June '94) [4:38]
8. ″Love, Where Are You?″ (demo-March '95) [4:33]
9. ″Sometimes I Think About You″ (live-November '93) [5:01]
10. ″Don't Patronize Me″ (demo-March '95) [4:16]
11. ″Available Light″ (demo-March '95) [6:23]
12. ″Won't Get Fooled Again″ (outtake-April '91) [8:31]

=== Krugerrands ===
Krugerrands

Studio album by Ian McNabb
- Released: August 2015
- Recorded: 2015
- Genre: Rock
- Length: 69:45
- Label: Fairfield
- Producer: Robert Ian McNabb

Ian McNabb chronology
| Eclectic Warrior (2013) | Krugerrands (2015) | Respectfully Yours (2016) |

Krugerrands is an album primarily containing re-recordings of previously released tracks that, according to McNabb "were either previously stripped to basics for their original recordings or done using drum machines and other such toys". The album was released on 3 August 2015, after having been made available for pre-order on McNabb's website in June. The album was a limited release of 1000 copies, and also included a cover of the Sly Fox song "Let's Go All the Way" and two versions of a new track, "Gravy". The album was a collaboration with Liverpudlian band Cold Shoulder, as was the previous album Eclectic Warrior.

According to McNabb's liner notes for the album, it is an attempt to improve on "a bunch of tunes from [his] catalogue [he] felt, although not uhappy [sic] with in their previous incarnations, had a lot of room to grow".

==== Track listing ====
1. ″Gravy (Intro)″ [1:49]
2. ″Hurricane Elaine″ [8:03] – Originally released on The Gentleman Adventurer
3. ″Rider (The Heartless Mare)″ [4:53] – Originally released on Before All of This
4. ″All About A Woman″ [5:09] – Originally released on Great Things
5. ″Gulf Coast Rockin'″ [4:46] – Originally released on The Gentleman Adventurer
6. ″A Guy Like Me (And A Girl Like You)″ [4:12] – Originally released on A Party Political Broadcast on Behalf of the Emotional Party
7. ″Little Princess″ [5:40] – Originally released on A Party Political Broadcast on Behalf of the Emotional Party
8. ″High on a Hill″ [7:32] – Originally released on Little Episodes
9. ″Let's Go All The Way″ [4:08] – Cover version of the Sly Fox song Let's Go All the Way
10. ″Ain't No Way To Behave″ [4:42] – Originally released on The Gentleman Adventurer
11. ″Misty Meadows″ [5:07] – Originally released on Waifs and Strays
12. ″Believer of Me″ [4:16] – Originally released as a live track on How We Live: At the Philharmonic
13. ″Stood Before St. Peter″ [4:08] – Originally released on The Icicle Works' album Blind
14. ″Gravy″ [5:10]

=== Respectfully Yours ===
Respectfully Yours

Studio album by Ian McNabb
- Released: 31 March 2016
- Recorded: January – February 2016
- Genre: Rock
- Label: Fairfield
- Producer: Robert Ian McNabb

Ian McNabb chronology
| Krugerrands (2015) | Respectfully Yours (2016) | Star Smile Strong (2017) |

Respectfully Yours is an album comprising songs originally recorded by other artists; it was McNabb's first covers album.

==== Track listing ====
1. ″Changes″ – a Black Sabbath song
2. ″Pocahontas″ – a Neil Young song
3. ″Run To Me″ – a Bee Gees song
4. ″Baltimore″ – a Randy Newman song, from the album Little Criminals
5. ″Life on Mars?″ – a David Bowie song
6. ″The Killing Moon″ – an Echo & the Bunnymen song
7. ″Montague Terrace in Blue″ – a Scott Walker song, from the album Scott
8. ″Memory Motel″ – a Rolling Stones song
9. ″The Crystal Ship″ – a Doors song
10. ″Time Ain't Nothin'″ – a Green on Red song, from the album No Free Lunch
