= Great Things =

Great Things may refer to:

- Great Things (album), a 2009 album by Ian McNabb, or the title song
- Great Things (Echobelly song), 1995
- Great Things (Phil Wickham song), 2018
- Great Things by Tade
