= Tony Viramontes =

American artist (1956–1988)

- Viramontes photographed in Monte Carlo by Alice Springs, 1986.
- Born: Frank Antony Viramontes; December 8, 1956; Santa Monica, California
- Died: May 23, 1988 (aged 31); Santa Monica, California
- Education: Art Center College of Design, Fashion Institute of Technology, The New School, School of Visual Arts
- Known for: Artist, Fashion Illustrator, photographer
- Website: tonyviramontes.com

Tony Viramontes (December 8, 1956 – May 23, 1988) was an American artist trained in Los Angeles and New York City, who found success in Europe and Japan as a fashion illustrator and photographer. He was born in Los Angeles from a family of first-generation Mexican Americans. From the late 1970s, his works appeared in numerous publications including Vogue, Marie Claire, Women's Wear Daily, L'Uomo Vogue, ID, Tatler, and Le Monde.

He produced album and single covers for recording artists and bands, including Control for Janet Jackson, All Systems Go for Donna Summer, So Red the Rose for Arcadia, Shock for the Motels, Let's Go All the Way for Sly Fox and the 1984 Olympic Games theme Destiny by Phil Pickett. In 2013, Jackson said of Viramontes, "He was very creative, and I believe one day his work will be iconic. he was such a joy to work with. I miss him". Alexander Fury of The Independent wrote "the artwork created with Eighties illustrator Tony Viramontes for Control stands the test of time".

Viramontes died in 1988 at the age of 31 of an AIDS related illness. Just before his death, fashion designer Hanae Mori, who had a long standing working relationship with Viramontes, commissioned a large format coffee-table book titled Viramontes that was published in Japan. A more comprehensive study of his work, Bold, Beautiful and Damned: The World of Fashion Illustrator Tony Viramontes, was published in 2013. The book, written by independent curator Dean Rhys-Morgan, featured an introduction from Jean-Paul Gaultier, an afterword by Vanity Fair contributing editor Amy Fine Collins, and over 250 illustrations from the Tony Viramontes studio archive. He also is one of the biggest inspirations of the manga artist Hirohiko Araki, writer of the best-selling Japanese manga JoJo's Bizarre Adventure.

Italian fashion brand Moschino worked with Viramontes estate for the SS23 menswear collection, creating garments with prints inspired by his work and style.
