= Let's Go All the Way (Sly Fox album) =

Studio album by Sly Fox
- Released: December 1985
- Recorded: 1984–1985
- Genres: Funk; new wave; dance-pop; pop rock
- Length: 33:52
- Label: Capitol
- Producer: Ted Currier

Singles from Let's Go All The Way
- 1. "Let's Go All the Way" Released: May 1985; 2. "Como Tu Te Llama" Released: October 1985; 3. "Stay True" Released: 1986; 4. "Don't Play with Fire" Released: 1986; 5. "Merry-Go-Round" Released: 1987

Professional ratings
Review scores
Source	Rating
AllMusic	link

Let's Go All the Way is the only studio album by American new wave duo Sly Fox, released in December 1985 by Capitol Records. It features the 1986 hit song of the same name. The follow-up singles, "Stay True" and "Merry-Go-Round", barely cracked the Billboard Hot 100 later in 1986.

The album has never officially been released on CD. An unofficial digital remaster released in 2002 by World Beyond Music Inc in the U.S. with 6 bonus tracks and standard tracks would later appear on digital storefronts.

== Track listing ==
Side one
No.	Title	Writer(s)	Length
1.	"Let's Go All the Way"	Gary "Mudbone" Cooper	5:10
2.	"Don't Play with Fire"	Cooper	3:44
3.	"I Still Remember"	Cooper; David Spradley; Joel Johnson	4:14
4.	"Won't Let You Go (A Wedding Song)"	Michael Camacho	3:45

Side two
No.	Title	Writer(s)	Length
1.	"Como Tu Te Llama? (What Is Your Name)"	Cooper; Camacho; Spradley; David Sanchez	5:16
2.	"Stay True"	Camacho	3:40
3.	"If Push Comes to a Shove"	Cooper	3:36
4.	"Merry-Go-Round"	Cooper; Camacho; Spradley	4:28
Total length:			33:52

== Personnel ==
Musicians

- Gary "Mudbone" Cooper – lead vocals
- Michael Camacho – lead vocals
- April Lang – backing vocals
- Cindy Mizelle – backing vocals
- David Sanchez – backing vocals
- Evan Rogers – backing vocals
- Tony Bridges – bass
- Blinky Brice – guitar
- Dave Lavender – guitar
- Frank Finley – guitar
- Kennan Keating – guitar
- David Spradley – keyboards
- Alec Shantzis – keyboards
- Johnny Ventura – percussion
- Steve Sprouse – percussion

Production and artwork

- David Spradley – co-producer
- Cherrie Shepherd – executive producer
- Roy Kohara – art direction
- Koji Takei – design
- Tony Viramontes – illustration
- Jay Googe – arrangement (track 4)
- Bob Rosa – engineer; mixing (tracks 1, 2, 5, 8)
- Bob Ross – engineer
- Michael Finlayson – engineer
- Steve Peck – engineer; mixing (tracks 2, 3, 4, 6, 7)
- Tom Lord-Alge – engineer
- Acar Key – assistant engineer
- Cathy Gazzo – assistant engineer
- Jeff Jones – assistant engineer
- Jeff Neiblum – assistant engineer
- John Klett – assistant engineer
- Mike Nicoletti – assistant engineer
- Roey Shamir – assistant engineer

Keyboards used

- Oberheim System
- Yamaha DX7
- Emulator II
- PPG Wave 2.3
- Roland Jupiter 8
- Roland Juno 60
- Yamaha Grand Piano
