= Let's Go All the Way (Sly Fox song) =

1985 single by Sly Fox

Single by Sly Fox

from the album Let's Go All the Way
- B-side: "Como tu te llama? (What Is Your Name)"
- Released: May 1985
- Recorded: 1984
- Genre: New wave
- Length: 5:10; 3:54 (single/video edit)
- Label: Capitol
- Songwriter: Gary "Mudbone" Cooper
- Producer: Ted Currier

Sly Fox singles chronology
"Let's Go All the Way" (1985)	"Como Tu Te Llama" (1986)

Audio sample
- "Sly Fox – Let's Go All the Way": file; help

"Let's Go All the Way" is a song by American new wave duo Sly Fox. Released as a single in 1985 from their debut studio album, Let's Go All the Way, the record became a sleeper hit, entering the top 10 of the singles charts in both the United States and the United Kingdom the following year. Despite receiving considerable commercial and critical success, the group failed to match expectations with their later singles and are sometimes referred to as a one-hit wonder. Original MTV veejay Martha Quinn has described "Let's Go All the Way" as "one of the funkiest songs ever".

== Composition ==
The track begins with synthesizer-processed chanting, with the lines "Simonini" repeating over a recurrent buzzing until drums and a synth-led riff begin. The duo of Gary "Mudbone" Cooper and Michael Camacho's harmonized vocals then come in, punctuated with deadpan "yeah, yeah, yeah"s. The title, repeated in the chorus, is often misconstrued as being about consummating a sexual relationship. In actuality, the lyrics contain no sexual content, but rather express disillusionment with aspects of late-20th century politics ("presidential party/No one wants to dance") and a yearning to perfect the human condition ("We need heaven on earth today/We can make a better way").

Cooper said the titular line is in fact a message of encouragement: "For me, the song simply meant that whatever your goal, dream or vision, you should go all the way to get it. In other words, don't let anything stop you from achieving, especially yourself. Those that saw the video saw it had kids destroying weapons etc. I guess some wanted to relate it to sex, and it could be whatever you want it to be, kind of like funk in general...ha ha ha!"

== Critical reception ==
AllMusic noted that "the song's oddball mix of hip-hop, Latin pop, disco, and new wave, crossed radio formats, from R&B to Top-40 to 'Rock of the '80s' stations ruled by the Smiths and the Cure."

== Chart performance ==
Following its release, the song was a top-10 hit in the United States, peaking at number seven in April 1986 and at number three on the UK Singles Chart that July. It reached number one in Canada, topping both the RPM 100 Singles chart and The Record singles chart. The song also peaked at number five in the Netherlands as well as number 14 in Belgium and number 27 in New Zealand.

== Music video ==
A music video received heavy airplay on MTV and is credited with greatly adding to the "infectious" song's success. The video juxtaposes three distinct modes. First straightforward and color negative studio performance of the duo dancing, emoting, and performing along with the song in a bright pop-art style. This is interspersed with shots of an interracial pair of young boys engaged in various activities, predominantly picking toy weapons of war out of a shopping cart and smashing them with hammers on an anvil as news footage is projected on a white backdrop. In other shots they march and stagger about dressed in combat fatigues and cavorting in sunglasses and surfer jams. The third thread consists of depression-era black & white clips from slapstick comedies and footage of factory workers. An atomic bomb blast is seen in reverse. The video ends with the two children in normal garb walking up to a large globe, picking the world up and carrying it.

While the song is not overtly anti-war, recurring themes from the video suggest it has such a theme. The destruction of weapons of war and the reverse-motion nuclear explosion can be viewed in the historical context of the time, the final years of the Cold War; in 1986 the Reagan administration increased spending on the so-called Star Wars SDI missile defense system as it officially abandoned the mutually signed but never-ratified SALT II arms-reduction treaty with the Soviet Union.

== Charts ==
=== Weekly charts ===
Chart (1986)	Peak position
Australia (Kent Music Report)	18
Belgium (Ultratop 50 Flanders)	14
Canada Retail Singles (The Record)	1
Canada Top Singles (RPM)	1
Europe (European Hot 100 Singles)	19
Ireland (IRMA)	4
Netherlands (Dutch Top 40)	6
Netherlands (Single Top 100)	5
New Zealand (Recorded Music NZ)	27
South Africa (Springbok Radio)	14
UK Singles (Official Charts)	3
US Billboard Hot 100	7
US Hot Black Singles (Billboard)	57
West Germany (GfK)	36

=== Year-end charts ===
Chart (1986)	Position
Australia (Kent Music Report)	84
Belgium (Ultratop)	51
Canada Top Singles (RPM)	32
Netherlands (Dutch Top 40)	67
Netherlands (Single Top 100)	54
UK Singles (OCC)	35
US Billboard Hot 100	45

== Remixes ==
A remix by Les "Mix Doctor" Adams of DMC contains samples of "We Will Rock You" by Queen and "A Fly Girl" by Boogie Boys.

== "One-hit wonder" ==
The duo released two follow-up singles from the album, both of which charted. The freestyle track "Como Tu Te Llama" was a Dance Music/Club Play hit, spending 9 weeks on that chart and reaching number 13. "Stay True" managed to dent the Hot 100, peaking at number 94, but "Let's Go All The Way" proved to be their only lasting international mainstream success, branding them as one-hit wonders. The song and its video retain their popularity in retro flashback programs and 1980s nights at dance clubs.

== Cover versions ==
=== Insane Clown Posse version ===
"Let's Go All the Way"

Single by Insane Clown Posse

from the album Bizzar
- Released: 2000
- Genre: Rap rock
- Length: 3:30
- Label: Psychopathic
- Songwriter: Gary "Mudbone" Cooper
- Producer: Mike E. Clark

Insane Clown Posse singles chronology
"Tilt-A-Whirl" (2000)	"Let's Go All the Way" (2000)	"Juggalo Homies" (2002)

Insane Clown Posse member Joseph Bruce, who performs as 'Violent J', was driving home to Detroit from Cleveland in a car he'd just purchased that had a cassette player. At a gas station, he purchased an ’80s Hits tape that contained the Sly Fox song. Bruce liked it and decided to reinterpret it.

Allmusic described Insane Clown Posse's version as "their most blatant attempt at radio play". MTV aired the band's video for the song, but only once in the late evening. The group decided to bombard MTV's Total Request Live (TRL) with requests for the video while on their Bizaar Bizzar Tour, posting on its website that December 8, 2000, was the day for fans to call.

On that day, the band and assorted Psychopathic Records employees and friends drove down to New York City. They were met by nearly 400 Insane Clown Posse fans standing outside in front of the TRL studios with signs supporting the duo. Thirty minutes before the show began, Viacom security guards and New York City police officers were dispatched to remove them from the sidewalk. When some refused to move on the grounds that it was a public street and no other individuals were asked to move, they allege they were assaulted. All phone requests for the video were ignored, and the band never was mentioned during the show. MTV later informed Island Records that the network chose which bands and videos were eligible to be featured on TRL.

=== Other versions ===
The song was covered in 1999 by supergroup the Wondergirls in a more rock style, and in 2013, it was re-recorded with actor and singer-songerwriter Ashley Hamilton and British singer Robbie Williams for the soundtrack of Iron Man 3: Heroes Fall.

In 2003, Sugababes sampled the music from this song for "Whatever Makes You Happy" on their third album Three.

In 2004, English-Irish boy-band Phixx recorded a version of the song on their album Electrophonic Revolution.

Liverpool singer-songwriter Ian McNabb (formerly of the Icicle Works) covered the song on his 2015 album Krugerrands.
