= Before All of This =

Studio album by Ian McNabb
- Released: 30 May 2005
- Recorded: 2005
- Genre: Pop
- Length: 55:34
- Label: Fairfield
- Producer: Robert Ian McNabb

Ian McNabb chronology
| The Gentleman Adventurer (2002) | Before All of This (2005) | Great Things (2009) |

Singles from Before All of This
- 1. "Let the Young Girl Do What She Wants To" Released: 16 May 2005

Before All of This is the title of Ian McNabb's seventh solo album after leaving the Icicle Works. It includes his last commercial single to date, "Let the Young Girl Do What She Wants To".

McNabb's album People Don't Stop Believin' comprises outtakes, B-sides and alternate versions of tracks recorded during sessions for Before All of This.

== Track listing ==
1. "There Oughta Be a Law" [3:29]
2. "Before All of This" [3:48]
3. "Unfinished Business in London Town (for Lee)" [3:55]
4. "Western Eyes" [5:14]
5. "The Lonely Ones (Part 1)" [3:37]
6. "Rider (The Heartless Mare)" [3:55]
7. "Finally Getting Over You" [2:58]
8. "Let the Young Girl Do What She Wants To" [4:34]
9. "The Nicest Kind of Lie" [4:14]
10. "Lovers at the End of Time" [5:06]
11. "Picture of the Moon" [2:38]
12. "The New Me" [4:56]
13. "Keeping Your Love Alive" [2:43]
14. "The Lonely Ones (Part 2)" [4:54]
