= A Party Political Broadcast on Behalf of the Emotional Party =

Studio album by Ian McNabb
- Released: 26 October 1998
- Recorded: June 24–29, 1998
- Studios: Monnow Valley Studios, Rockfield, Wales
- Genre: Pop
- Length: 45:37
- Label: Fairfield Trading Co.
- Producer: Robert Ian McNabb

Ian McNabb chronology
Merseybeast (1996)	A Party Political Broadcast on Behalf of the Emotional Party (1998)	Ian McNabb (2001)

Singles from A Party Political Broadcast on Behalf of the Emotional Party
- 1. "Little Princess" Released: January 1999

A Party Political Broadcast on Behalf of the Emotional Party is an album by Ian McNabb, his 4th as a solo artist. It was officially released on 26 October 1998, though some publications reported it being sold at concerts earlier that same month. The album peaked at No. 162 on the official UK charts.

== Track listing ==
All tracks composed by Ian McNabb

1. "Sex with Someone You Love" [5:12]
2. "A Guy Like Me (And a Girl Like You)" [5:10]
3. "Loveless Age" [4:59]
4. "You Only Get What You Deserve" [5:01]
5. "Bloom" [5:01]
6. "The Man Who Can Make a Woman Laugh" [4:26]
7. "Liverpool Girl" [4:31]
8. "Absolutely Wrong" [4:06]
9. "Little Princess" [5:55]
10. "Girls Are Birds" [2:36]

== Personnel ==
- Ian McNabb - acoustic guitar, mellotron, grand piano, shaker, tambourine, harp, vocals
- Mike Scott - acoustic guitar, tambourine, backing vocals on "Loveless Age" and "You Only Get What You Deserve"
- Danny Thompson - double bass on "Sex with Someone You Love", "Bloom", "Liverpool Girl" and "Little Princess"
- Anthony Thistlethwaite - mandolin, tenor saxophone, backing vocals on "Loveless Age", "Liverpool Girl" and "Little Princess"
