= You Must Be Prepared to Dream =

Single by Ian McNabb

from the album Head Like a Rock
- Released: June 1994
- Recorded: 1994
- Genre: Rock
- Label: This Way Up
- Songwriter(s): Robert Ian McNabb
- Producer(s): Robert Ian McNabb

Ian McNabb singles chronology
"(I Go) My Own Way" (1993)	"You Must Be Prepared to Dream" (1994)	"Go into the Light" (1994)

"You Must Be Prepared to Dream" is the sixth solo single released by Ian McNabb after disbanding the Icicle Works. The song was the second to be released from the album Head Like a Rock. The single charted at number 54 on the official UK charts, and would be McNabbs' best charting single for the next ten years. The 12" single was printed on purple vinyl.

== Track listings ==
Cassette

1. "You Must Be Prepared to Dream" (edit) (4:43)
2. "That's Why the Darkness Exists" (featuring Zak Starkey) (3:22)

Disc 1 and 12" vinyl

1. "You Must Be Prepared to Dream" (6:58)
2. "Sometimes I Think About You" (4:20)
3. "Woo Yer" (3:20)

Disc 2

1. "You Must Be Prepared to Dream" (Radio Edit) (4:00)
2. "You Must Be Prepared to Dream" (6:58)
3. "Love Is a Wonderful Colour" (4:18)
4. "When It All Comes Down" (4:29)

== Music video ==
The music video features, amongst other things, the ventriloquist's dummy from the album cover of Head Like a Rock in a cinema and a desert.
