= If Love Was Like Guitars =

Single by Ian McNabb

from the album Truth and Beauty
- Released: January 1993
- Recorded: 1992
- Genre: Rock
- Label: This Way Up
- Songwriter(s): Robert Ian McNabb
- Producer(s): Robert Ian McNabb

Ian McNabb singles chronology
"These Are the Days" (1991)	"If Love Was Like Guitars" (1993)	"I'm Game" (1993)

"If Love Was Like Guitars" is the third solo single released by Ian McNabb. The song was taken from the album Truth and Beauty. It charted at number 67 on the UK Singles Chart.

== Track listings ==
7"

1. "If Love Was Like Guitars" (4:06)
2. "Trams in Amsterdam" (3:45)

CD

1. "If Love Was Like Guitars" (4:06)
2. "Trams in Amsterdam" (3:45)
3. "Great Dreams of Heaven" (Acoustic) (4:58)
