= Eclectic Warrior =

Studio album by Ian McNabb
- Released: 18 March 2013
- Recorded: January – February 2013
- Genre: Pop
- Length: 61:50
- Label: Fairfield
- Producer: Robert Ian McNabb

Ian McNabb chronology
Little Episodes (2012)	Eclectic Warrior (2013)	Krugerrands (2015)

Eclectic Warrior is Ian McNabb's tenth solo album, released on Monday, 18 March 2013. The album features backing band Cold Shoulder, formed from previous Liverpool bands The Black Velvets and The Aeroplanes.

== PledgeMusic and release ==
The album was marketed as a PledgeMusic project, asking fans to 'pledge' for different rarities, concert tickets and versions of the album. Anyone making a pledge on the site would receive a minimum of a "New Full Band Electric Album download + updates". 5% of any money raised after the goal is reached would go to Teenage Cancer Trust. The album was originally scheduled to be released on Monday, 4 February 2013, after the pledge threshold was reached on 27 October 2012, two days after its launch. Before the original release date however, Ian wrote an apology to tell fans the release date had been postponed until 18 March 2013 (due to the unavailability of the planned recording studio). Ian described the unusual release of the album as a "little way of saying thank you... as well as a great charity cause." As of late December 2012, the Album was confirmed, via McNabb's Facebook page, to be titled 'Eclectic Warrior'.

== Post-release and reception ==
The album was released digitally on 18 March 2013, the pledge project reaching 304% of its goal with a total of 905 pledges. The album received a good critical reception. Dave Jennings of LouderThanWar.com gave the album a positive review, stating "This is a tour de force of an album with the power to take the roof of many a venue".

== Track listing ==
Eclectic Warrior (standard edition)

1. "Smirtin'" (3:15)
2. "No Hero to Me" (3:51)
3. "They Couldn't Hear The Music" (5:50)
4. "My Life To Live Again" (7:36)
5. "(I Just Wanna) Rock n Roll My Life Away" (4:53)
6. "She Don't Let Nobody" (4:44)
7. "Woman Killed By Falling Tree" (6:35)
8. "Fast Approaching Land" (6:20)
9. "The House Always Wins" (4:56)
10. "Memory Be Good To Me, Memory Come Back To Me" (9:14)
11. "Right on Time" (4:42)

Note: The tracks "She Don't Let Nobody" and "Right on Time" had previously released as demos before inclusion on Eclectic Warrior, "She Don't Let Nobody" as a promotional single and "Right on Time" on the album Boots

Eclectic Warrior Demos (Disc 2)

1. "Woman Killed By Falling Tree"
2. "Memory Be Good To Me, Memory Come Back To Me"
3. "She Don't Let Nobody"
4. "My Life to Live Again"
5. "They Couldn't Hear The Music"
6. "Fast Approaching Land"
7. "Smirtin'"
8. "No Hero To Me"
9. "Right on Time"
10. "(I Just Wanna) Rock n Roll My Life Away"
11. "The House Always Wins"
