= Let the Young Girl Do What She Wants To =

Single by Ian McNabb

from the album Before All of This
- Released: 16 May 2005
- Recorded: 2005
- Genre: Rock
- Label: Fairfield Trading Co.
- Songwriter: Robert Ian McNabb
- Producer: Robert Ian McNabb

Ian McNabb singles chronology
"Little Princess" (1999)	"Let the Young Girl Do What She Wants To" (2005)

"Let the Young Girl Do What She Wants To" is the eleventh solo single released by Ian McNabb. The song was the sole single release from the album Before All of This and is McNabb's highest charting single to date. The single charted at number 38 on the UK Singles Chart shortly after its release, due to a fan-driven attempt to gain greater publicity and recognition for his then-current album, Before All of This.

== Critical reception ==
A Music-news.com review stated that the single "packs a surprise punch and reveals a very clever catchy tune", before concluding that it was "worth a listen."

== Track listings ==
7"

1. "Let the Young Girl Do What She Wants To" [2:52]
2. "They Will Find You Out" [4:13]

CD & digital download

1. "Let the Young Girl Do What She Wants To" [2:54]
2. "They Shoot Horses Don't They" [3:51]
3. "Message from the Country" [3:28]
