= Ian McNabb (album) =

Studio album by Ian McNabb
- Released: 2 April 2001
- Recorded: 2000–2001
- Genre: Pop
- Length: 57:34
- Label: Sanctuary
- Producer: Robert Ian McNabb

Ian McNabb chronology
A Party Political Broadcast on Behalf of the Emotional Party (1998)	Ian McNabb (2001)	The Gentleman Adventurer (2002)

Ian McNabb (Sometimes referred to as The Batman Album or simply Batman to avoid confusion) is Ian McNabb's eponymous 5th solo album after leaving The Icicle Works. The album peaked at No. 185 on the official UK charts.

== Track listing ==
All tracks composed by Ian McNabb

1. "Livin' Proof (Miracles Can Happen)" (4:21)
2. "Whatever it Takes" (3:23)
3. "What You Wanted" (4:14)
4. "Liverpool Girl" (4:07)
5. "(If We Believe) What Love Can Do" (4:29)
6. "Alright With Me" (4:42)
7. "Hollywood Tears" (4:13)
8. "Open Air" (3:37)
9. "Nothin' Less Than the Very Best" (4:57)
10. "Hotel Stationary" (4:38)
11. "Rockin' For Jesus" (4:02)
12. "Friend of My Enemy" (4:57)
13. "Moment in the Sun" (4:05)
14. "(I Wish I Was In) California" (3:49)

== Personnel ==
- Ian McNabb - guitar, vocals, backing vocals; bass on "Nothin' Less Than the Very Best"
- Roy Corkill - bass; guitar on "Open Air"
- Geoff Dugmore - drums, percussion, mellotron, keyboards, backing vocals
- Liam McKahey - vocals on "Hollywood Tears"
