= Truth and Beauty (Ian McNabb album) =

Studio album by Ian McNabb
- Released: 1993
- Recorded: 1991–92
- Studio: Amazon, Liverpool; Vibe, [Oldham]
- Genre: Rock
- Length: 58:21
- Label: This Way Up
- Producer: Boots (Robert Ian McNabb)

Ian McNabb chronology
Truth and Beauty (1993)	Head Like a Rock (1994)

Singles from Truth and Beauty
- 1. "Great Dreams of Heaven" Released: July 1991; 2. "These Are the Days" Released: October 1991; 3. "If Love Was Like Guitars" Released: January 1993; 4. "I'm Game" Released: June 1993; 5. "(I Go) My Own Way" Released: August–September 1993

Truth and Beauty is the debut solo album by Ian McNabb, released in 1993. It was recorded shortly after he left the Icicle Works. The album peaked at No. 51 on the official UK charts. It was reissued in September 2013 as an expanded edition, including a second disc of B-sides.

== Critical reception ==
AllMusic wrote that "McNabb's cozy-fireplace vocals are finally layered right up front in the mix where they belong."

== Track listing ==
- All songs written and arranged by Ian McNabb.

Truth and Beauty [International]

1. "(I Go) My Own Way" (5:09)
2. "These Are the Days" (4:29)
3. "Great Dreams of Heaven" (5:07)
4. "Truth and Beauty" (6:50)
5. "I'm Game" (4:32)
6. "If Love Was Like Guitars" (5:06)
7. "Story of My Life" (3:17)
8. "That's Why I Believe" (5:26)
9. "Trip with Me" (3:48)
10. "Make Love to You" (4:39)
11. "Presence of the One" (11:58)

Expanded Edition (Disc 2)
No.	Title	Length
1.	"(I Go) My Own Way" (John Leckie Version)	5:21
2.	"Trams in Amsterdam" (B-side of "These Are the Days")	3:43
3.	"Great Dreams of Heaven" (Acoustic; B-side of "These Are the Days")	4:59
4.	"Unknown Legend" (B-side of "Great Dreams of Heaven")	3:36
5.	"I'm Game" (B-side of "Great Dreams of Heaven")	4:26
6.	"Caroline No" (B-side of "Great Dreams of Heaven")	3:07
7.	"A Pirate Looks at Forty" (B-side of "I'm Game")	4:11
8.	"What's It All About?" (B-side of "I'm Game")	4:27
9.	"I'm Game" (Radio Edit; B-side of "I'm Game")	4:08
10.	"Play the Hand They Deal You" (B-side of "(I Go) My Own Way")	5:40
11.	"If My Daddy Could See Me Now" (B-side of "(I Go) My Own Way")	3:07
12.	"For You, Angel" (B-side of "(I Go) My Own Way")	7:44

== Personnel ==
- Robert Ian McNabb – vocals, keyboards, guitars
- Dave Baldwin – keyboards on "These are the Days"
- Gordon Longworth – lead guitar on "If Love was Like Guitars", "Story of My Life" and "Presence of the One"
- Roy Corkill – electric bass, drum and keyboard programming

Technical

- Ken Nelson, Mark Phythian – mixing
- Robert Shaw – cover photography
