= Merseybeast (song) =

Single by Ian McNabb

from the album Merseybeast
- Released: May 1996
- Recorded: 1996
- Genre: Rock
- Label: This Way Up
- Songwriter: Robert Ian McNabb
- Producer: Robert Ian McNabb

Ian McNabb singles chronology
"Don't Put Your Spell on Me" (1996)	"Merseybeast" (1996)	"Little Princess" (1999)

"Merseybeast" is the ninth solo single released by Ian McNabb. The song was the second and final single to be released from the album of the same name. It charted at number 74 on the UK Singles Chart. The CD single came in two distinct 'halves'; the spines of which could be connected to display one collective spine.

== Track listings ==
CD, disc 1

1. "Merseybeast" (Radio Edit) (4:17)
2. "Up Here in the North of England" (demo, January '86) (5:07)
3. "Permanent Damage" (demo, September '88) (3:36)
4. "Merseybeast" (demo, March '95) (7:00)

CD, disc 2

1. "Merseybeast" (LP Version) (6:49)
2. "Pretty Boys with Big Guitars" (5:02)
3. "The Slider" (3:38)
4. "Snaked" (4:50)

7"

1. "Merseybeast" (Radio Edit) (4:17)
2. "Up Here in the North of England" (demo, Jan. '86) (5:07)

== Music video ==
The music video shows McNabb travelling through Liverpool flanked by a garden gnome and an astronaut. Directed by Max Abbiss-Biro and produced by Nick Verden for Stark 2 Films.
