= Star Smile Strong =

Studio album by Ian McNabb
- Released: 20 April 2017
- Recorded: August 2016 – January 2017
- Genre: Rock
- Length: 59:06
- Label: Fairfield
- Producer: Ciaron Bell

Ian McNabb chronology
| Respectfully Yours (2016) | Star Smile Strong (2017) | Our Future in Space (2018) |

Star Smile Strong is Ian McNabb's eleventh solo studio album, released in April 2017. In March, McNabb had previously released the entirety of the album online, on his SoundCloud profile.

== Track listing ==
1. "Mystic Age" (featuring Professor Brian Cox) – 8:01
2. "Can't Get What I Want" – 3:13
3. "How She Moves" – 2:58
4. "Waitin' for a Streetcar" – 2:48
5. "Enabler" – 4:24
6. "Lazy Water" – 4:26
7. "I Kinda Like It Without You" – 5:01
8. "Hotter than the Sun" – 4:43
9. "Women Love a Bastard – Men Love a Bitch" – 3:38
10. "Wanna Change My Plea to Guilty" – 3:55
11. "This Love I Feel for You" – 3:17
12. "Clarabella – Come to the Window" – 12:42

== Critical reception ==
Star Smile Strong received positive acclaim upon release. Nick Hall of Fatea magazine states that 'It almost seems like lazy writing to point out that, in a parallel universe somewhere, Ian is striding the world stages like a U2-sized behemoth, and that it's criminal that, in this universe, he's not. However, those in the know (a large catchment that is ever-growing, actually), know that – as well as being one of our most charismatic live performers, Ian McNabb is up there as one of the finest singer-songwriters and guitarists that these isles have ever produced. This album will delight that large, growing fan-base and should, with the aid of word-of-mouth, draw even more people in.' Similarly, Nigel Cartner of Sonic Bandwagon noted that 'This is a highly recommended album – one of the best of the year from a man who's no stranger to producing excellence throughout his illustrious career.'
