= These Are the Days (Ian McNabb song) =

Single by Ian McNabb

from the album Truth and Beauty
- Released: October 1991, January 1993
- Recorded: 1991
- Genre: Rock
- Label: Fat Cat Records/This Way Up
- Songwriter(s): Robert Ian McNabb
- Producer(s): Robert Ian McNabb

Ian McNabb singles chronology
| "Great Dreams of Heaven" (1991) | "These Are the Days" (1991) | "If Love Was Like Guitars" (1993) |

"These Are the Days" is the second solo single by English singer-songwriter Ian McNabb. Like "Great Dreams of Heaven", it was first released in 1991. It was allegedly re-released in 1993 in limited quantities, taken from the album, Truth and Beauty.

== Track listings ==
1991 release

CD and 12"

1. "These Are the Days" (4:32)
2. "Trams in Amsterdam" (3:45)
3. "Great Dreams of Heaven" (Acoustic) (4:58)

7"

1. "These Are the Days" (Radio Edit) (3:48)
2. "Trams in Amsterdam" (3:43)
