= Waifs & Strays (album) =

Compilation album by Ian McNabb
- Released: 1 October 2001
- Recorded: 1993–2000
- Genre: Pop
- Label: Evangeline
- Producer: Robert Ian McNabb

Waifs & Strays is an Ian McNabb album of previously unreleased archival material recorded between 1993 and 2000.

== Critical response ==
Andrew Mueller gave a critical review stating that "the songs here, while occasionally affecting, are mostly a series of explanations for McNabb's relative obscurity." He also stated that "Waifs & Strays is the definitive cult item", but conceded that "Its release makes a certain amount of sense".

== Track listing ==
No.	Title	Length
1.	"Loveless Age"	6:45
2.	"Camaderie"	4:24
3.	"Fire Inside My Soul"	6:15
4.	"Gak Mummy No. 1"	2:11
5.	"I'm A Genius"	4:54
6.	"Me and the Devil"	9:33
7.	"Why are the beautiful so sad?"	4:23
8.	"Misty Meadows"	5:14
9.	"Not Lost Enough To Be Rescued"	8:30
10.	"Time of My Time"	4:56
11.	"Great Dreams of Heaven"	4:57
12.	"Nobody Say Nothin' To No One"	4:24
13.	"You Stone My Soul"	4:56
14.	"The New Golden Age"	7:34
