= Great Dreams of Heaven =

Single by Ian McNabb

from the album Truth and Beauty
- Released: July 1991, March 1993
- Genre: Rock
- Label: Way Cool Records/This Way Up
- Songwriter(s): Robert Ian McNabb
- Producer(s): Robert Ian McNabb

Ian McNabb singles chronology
"Great Dreams of Heaven" (1991)	"These Are the Days" (1991)

"Great Dreams of Heaven" is the first solo single released by Ian McNabb after disbanding the Icicle Works. It was first released in 1991, then re-released in 1993 in order to promote the album Truth and Beauty.

== Track listings ==
1991 release

7"

1. "Great Dreams of Heaven"
2. "That's Why I Believe"

CD [Germany] & 12"

1. "Great Dreams of Heaven" (5:10)
2. "That's Why I Believe" (5:29)
3. "Make Love to You" (4:43)
4. "Power of Song" (4:02)

1993 release

7" & cassette

1. "Great Dreams of Heaven" (5:07)
2. "Unknown Legend" (3:55)

12"

1. "Great Dreams of Heaven" (5:07)
2. "Unknown Legend" (3:35)
3. "I'm Game" (4:25)
4. "Caroline No" (3:05)

CD

1. "Great Dreams of Heaven (Version)" (3:55)
2. "Unknown Legend" (3:35)
3. "I'm Game" (4:25)
4. "Caroline No" (3:05)

CD [France]

1. "Great Dreams of Heaven (Version)" (3:55)
2. "Unknown Legend" (3:35)

== Music video ==
The accompanying music video showed, amongst other things, McNabb singing into a telephone receiver.
