= Liverpool – The Number Ones Album =

Compilation album by various artists
- Released: 4 February 2008
- Genre: Pop
- Length: 77:34
- Label: EMI

Singles from Liverpool – The Number Ones Album
- 1. "Anyone Who Had a Heart" Released: 27 January 2008

This compilation album is part of "The Number One Project", a music based charity event in Liverpool, to mark its status as European Capital of Culture for 2008. The city delivered 56 number one singles for the UK charts. On this album 21 of these songs are covered by other Liverpudlian artists. The proceeds from this project will be distributed among local Charities.

Atomic Kitten's cover of "Anyone Who Had a Heart" was released as a digital single, and reached no. 77 on the UK Singles Chart. The Atomic Kitten song "Whole Again", covered here by Orchestral Manoeuvres in the Dark (OMD), was originally co-written by OMD members Andy McCluskey and Stuart Kershaw (along with Jem Godfrey and Bill Padley).

== Track listing ==
1. "Anyone Who Had a Heart" - Atomic Kitten – 3:15
2. "Needles and Pins" - The Farm – 3:35
3. "Woman" - Ian McNabb – 3:52
4. "You Spin Me Right Round" - Thea Gilmore & Mike Cave – 3:50
5. "Don't Throw Your Love Away" - Elvis Costello feat. Amsterdam – 2:56
6. "3 Shirts on a Line" - The Scaffold – 3:54
7. "Whole Again" - Orchestral Manoeuvres in the Dark – 3:29
8. "Relax" - Anthony Hannah – 4:28
9. "She Loves You" - Sonia – 2:46
10. "From Me to You" - Eton Road – 2:45
11. "Starry Eyed" - China Crisis – 2:57
12. "Eleanor Rigby" - The Real Thing – 4:58
13. "You're My World" - Kush feat. Natasha Hamilton – 3:21
14. "My Sweet Lord" - Garry Christian and Desa Basshead – (Bassheads) 4:23
15. "A Hard Day's Night" - Sonny J – 3:31
16. "Day Tripper" - Shack – 4:16
17. "You'll Never Walk Alone" - Thomas Lang – 3:03
18. "The Power Of Love" - Frankie Goes to Hollywood's Brian Nash feat. Connie Lush – 4:57
19. "Paperback Writer" - Digsy & The Sums – 3:09
20. "Hey Jude" - The Real People – 5:11
21. "Imagine" - The Talk Abouts feat. Liz McClarnon – 2:58
