= People Don't Stop Believin' =

Compilation album by Ian McNabb
- Released: 12 September 2005
- Recorded: 2005
- Genre: Pop
- Label: Fairfield Records
- Producer: Robert Ian McNabb

People Don't Stop Believin' is an Ian McNabb album compiling demos, B-sides, and versions of songs from the recording sessions of Before All of This. It was predominantly on sale as a digital download rather than a physical album.

== Track listing ==
1. "Let The Young Girl Do What She Wants to Do" [Demo] [3:24]
2. "Picture of the Moon" [Alternate 'loud guitars' mix] [2:38]
3. "Message From the Country" [B-side] [3:32]
4. "The New Me" [Early version] [4:33]
5. "They Shoot Horses Don't They" [B-side] [3:53]
6. "People Don't Stop Believin'" [Previously unreleased song] [7:59]
7. "They Will Find You Out" [B-side] [4:17]
8. "The Absentee" [Previously unreleased song] [6:08]
9. "The Nicest Kind of Lie" [Early version] [4:04]
10. "The Lonely Ones" [1][Clean vocal] [3:37]
11. "Finally Getting Over You" [Band take] [3:10]
12. "Let The Young Girl Do What She Wants To" [Single version] [2:52]
