= Head Like a Rock =

Studio album by Ian McNabb
- Released: 4 July 1994
- Recorded: 1993
- Studio: Red Zone Studios, Burbank, California; Mayfair Studios, Regents Park, London
- Genre: Rock
- Length: 67:03
- Label: This Way Up
- Producer: Robert Ian McNabb, John Porter

Ian McNabb chronology
Truth and Beauty (1993)	Head Like a Rock (1994)	Merseybeast (1996)

Singles from Head Like a Rock
- 1. "You Must Be Prepared to Dream" Released: June 1994; 2. "Go into the Light" Released: September 1994

Professional ratings
Review scores
Source	Rating
Music Week	4/5 stars

Head Like a Rock is a 1994 concept album released on 4 July 1994, and recorded by Ian McNabb. McNabb's second solo album, it was nominated for the 1994 Mercury Music Prize. The album was recorded in Los Angeles with the backing band Crazy Horse. The album peaked at No. 29 on the official UK charts.

Late in 2012, McNabb revealed that his first three studio albums were to be re-released as 'expanded editions'. In early December 2013, 'Head Like a Rock (Expanded edition)' was announced on Amazon with a scheduled release date of January 28, 2013: "This expanded version has been re-mastered by Ian himself and is a testament to the great album it was, enhanced with upgraded packaging and a bonus disc of the B-sides that came with the assorted singles. This is a great addition to the canon of Ian's work."

== Track listing ==
All tracks composed by Ian McNabb

1. "Fire Inside My Soul" (8:35)
2. "You Must Be Prepared to Dream" (6:57)
3. "Child Inside a Father" (9:02)
4. "Still Got the Fever" (7:29)
5. "Potency"(4:38)
6. "Go Into the Light" (4:08)
7. "As a Life Goes By" (4:42)
8. "Sad Strange Solitary Catholic Mystic" (4:45)
9. "This Time Is Forever"(5:38)
10. "May You Always" (10:51)

Expanded Edition (Disc 2)
No.	Title	Length
1.	"That's Why The Darkness Exists" (B-side of "You Must Be Prepared to Dream", With guest drummer Zak Starkey)	3:23
2.	"Sometimes I Think About You" (B-side of "You Must Be Prepared to Dream")	4:20
3.	"Woo Yer" (B-side of "You Must Be Prepared to Dream")	3:20
4.	"Love Is A Wonderful Colour" (B-side of You Must Be Prepared to Dream)	4:17
5.	"When It All Comes Down" (B-side of "You Must Be Prepared to Dream")	4:27
6.	"Time You Were In Love" (B-side of "Go into the Light")	4:25
7.	"Go Into The Light (Celestial Dub Mix)" (A-side of "Go into the Light")	7:21
8.	"Rock" (B-side of "Go into the Light")	3:00
9.	"I Stood Before St Peter" (B-side of "Go into the Light")	3:47

== Personnel ==
- Ian McNabb - guitar, vocals
- John Porter - acoustic guitar, keyboards; dobro on "As a Life Goes By"
- Billy Talbot - bass, backing vocals
- Ralph Molina - drums, backing vocals; co-lead vocals on "Child Inside a Father"
- Tommy Eyre - organ; piano on "This Time is Forever"; synthesizer and string arrangement on "Sad Strange Solitary Catholic Mystic"
- James Hutchinson - bass
- Joseph Modeliste - drums
- Tony Braunagel - percussion
- Greg Leisz - pedal steel guitar; lap steel on "Potency"
- Scarlet Rivera - violin on "Potency" and "Sad Strange Solitary Catholic Mystic"
- Roy Corkill - acoustic guitar, bass
- Mike "Tone" Hamilton - rhythm guitar, backing vocals
- Nick Warren - keyboards on "Still Got the Fever" and "This Time is Forever"
- Martin Tillman - cello on "Potency" and "Sad Strange Solitary Catholic Mystic"
- Marty Grebb - alto saxophone on "Go Into the Light"
- Maxi Anderson, Mona Lisa Young, Terry Young - backing vocals

Technical

- Joe McGrath - engineer
- Ian McNabb, Pete Schwier - mixing
- Phil Smee - design
- Theo Westenberger - front cover photography of Reggie J. Trickpus (Alan Ende Ventriloquist Collection)
