= Merseybeast =

Studio album by Ian McNabb
- Released: 19 April 1996
- Recorded: 1996
- Venue: King's College, London
- Studio: Rockfield Studios; Swanyard Studios, Islington, London; Parr Street Studios, Liverpool
- Genre: Pop rock
- Length: 69:27
- Label: This Way Up
- Producer: Robert Ian McNabb, Bruce Lampcov, Pete Schwier

Ian McNabb chronology
Head Like a Rock (1994)	Merseybeast (1996)	A Party Political Broadcast on Behalf of the Emotional Party (1998)

Singles from Merseybeast
- 1. "Don't Put Your Spell on Me" Released: April 1996; 2. "Merseybeast" Released: May 1996

Merseybeast is an album by Ian McNabb, his third as a solo artist. The name is a play on "Merseybeat", a 1960s musical genre and movement. Merseybeast is also the title of Ian McNabb's autobiography, published in 2008. A second CD entitled North West Coast was also released in limited quantities. The album peaked at No. 30 on the official UK charts.

== Critical reception ==
Roch Parisien of Allmusic praised McNabb's "open, wide-eyed innocence" on the album, remarking that the sentiments expressed in the songs defy the conventions of rock music, and that his sincerity makes them work. The site gave Merseybeast a rating of 4.5 stars out of 5.

== Track listings ==
All tracks composed by Ian McNabb, except where indicated.

1. "Merseybeast" (6:44)
2. "Affirmation" (3:33)
3. "Beautiful Old Mystery" (4:10)
4. "Love's Young Dream" (4:33)
5. "Camaraderie" (4:17)
6. "Don't Put Your Spell on Me" (5:38)
7. "Heydays" (5:45)
8. "Little Bit of Magic" (4:54)
9. "You Stone My Soul" (6:16)
10. "Too Close to the Sun" (3:47)
11. "They Settled for Less Than They Wanted" (7:20)
12. "I'm a Genius" (4:19)
13. "Available Light" (6:20)
14. "Merseybeast (reprise)" (1:51)

North West Coast (Live bonus CD)

1. "What She Did to My Mind" (7:26)
2. "Evangeline" (6:29)
3. "I Don't Want to Talk About It" (Danny Whitten) (6:15)
4. "When It All Comes Down" (8:18)
5. "Understanding Jane" (4:08)
6. "Pushin' Too Hard" (Sky Saxon) (7:16)

== Personnel ==
- Ian McNabb - vocals, guitar, Moog synthesizer, piano, bass, harmonica, autoharp
- Russell Milton - bass
- Don Richardson - double bass
- Henry Priestman - Hammond B3 organ, backing vocals
- Daniel Strittmatter - drums
- Preston Heyman - percussion
- Andrew Findon - flute
- Nick Warren - programming
- Craig Leon - conductor, strings
- Cassell Webb - conductor, strings
- Billy Talbot - bass. backing vocals on North West Coast
- Ralph Molina - drums, backing vocals on North West Coast
- Nick Warren - keyboards on North West Coast
- Mike Hamilton - rhythm guitar, backing vocals on North West Coast
