= Don't Put Your Spell on Me =

Single by Ian McNabb

from the album Merseybeast
- Released: April 1996
- Recorded: 1996
- Genre: Rock
- Label: This Way Up
- Songwriter(s): Robert Ian McNabb
- Producer(s): Robert Ian McNabb

Ian McNabb singles chronology
"Go into the Light" (1994)	"Don't Put Your Spell on Me" (1996)	"Merseybeast" (1996)

"Don't Put Your Spell on Me" is the eighth solo single by Ian McNabb. The single was the first to be released from the album Merseybeast. It charted at number 72 on the UK Singles Chart.

== Track listings ==
CD

1. "Don't Put Your Spell on Me" (4:37)
2. "Don't Patronise Me" (4:07)
3. "What She Did to My Mind" (7:31)

7" & cassette

1. "Don't Put Your Spell on Me" (4:37)
2. "Don't Patronise Me" (4:07)

== Music video ==
The music video depicts gothic scenes, and McNabb being stalked by a sinister looking man.
