= Go into the Light =

1994 single by Ian McNabb

Single by Ian McNabb

from the album Head Like a Rock
- Released: September 1994
- Recorded: 1994
- Genre: Rock
- Label: This Way Up
- Songwriter(s): Robert Ian McNabb
- Producer(s): Robert Ian McNabb

Ian McNabb singles chronology
"You Must Be Prepared to Dream" (1994)	"Go into the Light" (1994)	"Don't Put Your Spell on Me" (1996)

Professional ratings
Review scores
Source	Rating
Music Week	3/5 stars

"Go into the Light" is the seventh solo single released by English singer-songwriter and musician Ian McNabb. It was the third and final to be released from his second solo album, Head Like a Rock (1994). The song was both written and produced by McNabb, and peaked at number 66 on the official UK charts.

== Critical reception ==
Alan Jones from Music Week wrote, "Enjoyable gospel workout that is likely to attract a fair amount of attention following the artist's nomination for the Mercury Music Prize."

== Track listings ==
- CD single
1. "Go Into the Light" (Celestial Dub Mix) (7:22)
2. "Rock" (3:00)
3. "I Stood Before St. Peter" (3:45)
4. "Go Into the Light" (3:52)
- 12" vinyl
1. "Go Into the Light" (Celestial Dub Mix) (7:22)
2. "For You, Angel" (7:46)
3. "Go Into the Light" (3:51)
- Numbered 12" vinyl
1. "Go Into the Light" (Jah Wobble Mix)
2. "Time You Were in Love"
3. "Go Into the Light"
- Cassette
1. "Go Into the Light" (3:51)
2. "Time You Were in Love" (4:25)

== Charts ==
Chart (1994)	Peak position
UK Singles (OCC)	66
UK Airplay (Music Week)	38
