= Ian McNabb =

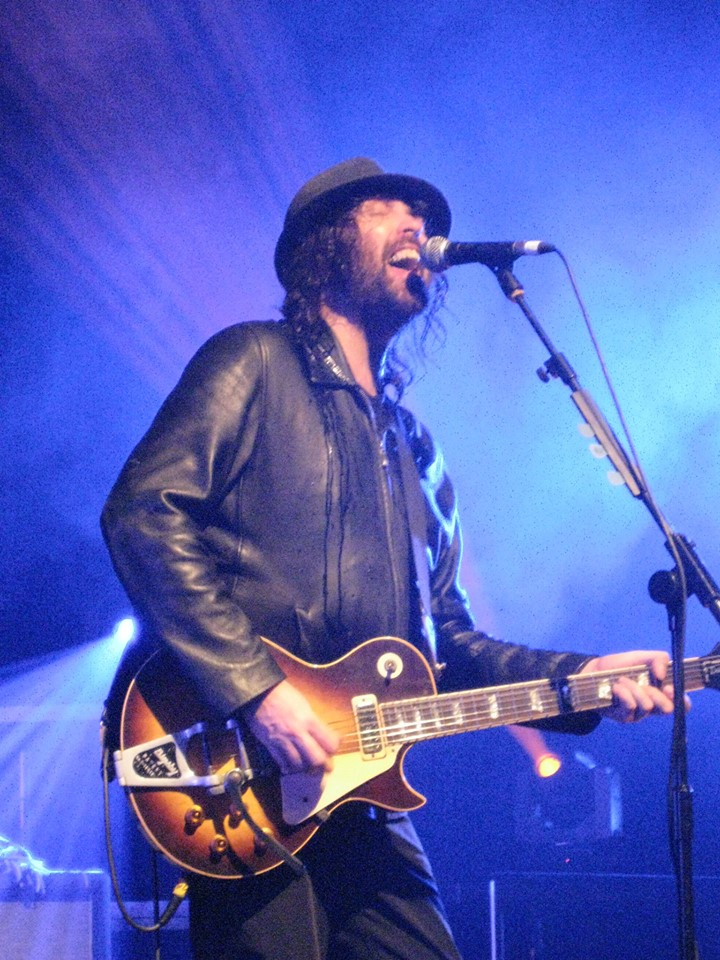
- McNabb on stage in Birmingham, England

Background information
- Also known as: Boots
- Born: Robert Ian McNabb; 3 November 1960 (age 66); Mossley Hill, Liverpool, England
- Genres: Alternative rock; new wave
- Occupations: Musician; songwriter
- Instruments: Vocals; guitar; keyboards; bass guitar
- Years active: 1980–present
- Labels: Fairfield; This Way Up

Robert Ian McNabb (born 3 November 1960) is an English singer-songwriter and musician. Previously the frontman of the Icicle Works, McNabb has since embarked on a solo career and performed with Ringo Starr, Neil Young/Crazy Horse, Mike Scott (of the Waterboys), and Danny Thompson of folk band Pentangle.

McNabb's first book, an autobiography entitled Merseybeast, was published in October 2008.

== Early life ==
Robert Ian McNabb was born on 3 November 1960 in Lourdes Hospital (now Spire Liverpool Hospital) in Mossley Hill, Liverpool, the first and only child of Patricia (née Forsyth) and Robert Gerard McNabb. At 18 months old he contracted pneumonia, leaving him with a damaged left lung.

He had a brief stint as a child model, and a resultant photo was later featured on the album art of Potency: The Best of Ian McNabb.

Following seeing 2001: A Space Odyssey as a child, McNabb has been an avid space-enthusiast. He has also been a supporter of Liverpool F.C. since childhood.

McNabb cites his earliest musical influences as being from watching T. Rex's "Born to Boogie" and That'll Be the Day starring David Essex at the age of 10. After this he began attending guitar and music theory lessons.

McNabb's first musical performance was playing "You're Sixteen" at Fairfield Conservative Club in Liverpool in 1974. In 1975, he auditioned and joined the young cabaret group Daybreak (Later renamed "Young World"). The group played at working men's clubs around the North-West of England during the mid-1970s. The group unsuccessfully auditioned for television talent show Opportunity Knocks. Chris Sharrock later joined the group, where McNabb first became friends with him, he would go on to drum for The Icicle Works. McNabb wrote his first song at age 15, titled "Apologise (I Will)".

McNabb quit Young World near the end of 1976 and joined an all-male teen cabaret group called City Lights. In 1977 the group auditioned for ITV's New Faces but were unsuccessful. McNabb began attending the Mabel Fletcher College of Music and Drama.

He quit City Lights in February 1980, having agreed to start a band with Chris Sharrock.

McNabb auditioned for the role of Barry Grant in Brookside but was unsuccessful.

== Career ==
McNabb has had a career as a solo career as well as performing with the likes of Ringo Starr, Neil Young/Crazy Horse, Mike Scott (of the Waterboys), and Danny Thompson of folk band Pentangle.

=== The Icicle Works ===
McNabb became the lead vocalist and songwriter for the band, which was founded in 1980. The band's other members were Chris Sharrock on drums and Chris Layhe on bass guitar and backing vocals.

The Icicle Works had success in the UK with the top 20 single "Love Is a Wonderful Colour" in 1983. They also reached the top 40 in the United States and Canada with the single "Whisper to a Scream (Birds Fly)" in 1984.

The Icicle Works continued recording through the 1980s with limited success. In the UK, several of the band's follow-up singles charted, although none reached higher than No. 52. In the US, they briefly made the Modern Rock chart in 1988, but achieved no further mainstream recognition and were regarded in the US and Canada as a one-hit wonder.

The original line-up of the Icicle Works broke up in 1988. McNabb put together a new "second generation" Icicle Works line-up in 1989, which released one album in 1990. However, the album was commercially unsuccessful and the band broke up the following year.

In October 2006, after 15 years as a solo artist, McNabb revived the name the Icicle Works for a series of UK concerts. However, this new version of his old band did not feature any original Icicle Works members other than McNabb. Throughout 2007 and into early 2008, McNabb played dates as both a solo artist and with The Icicle Works. He then retired the band name for a few years, before playing a handful of "30th Anniversary" shows as the Icicle Works in 2011. He still continues to perform live shows with The Icicle Works in addition to solo performances.

=== Solo career ===
==== 1991–1997: This Way Up era ====
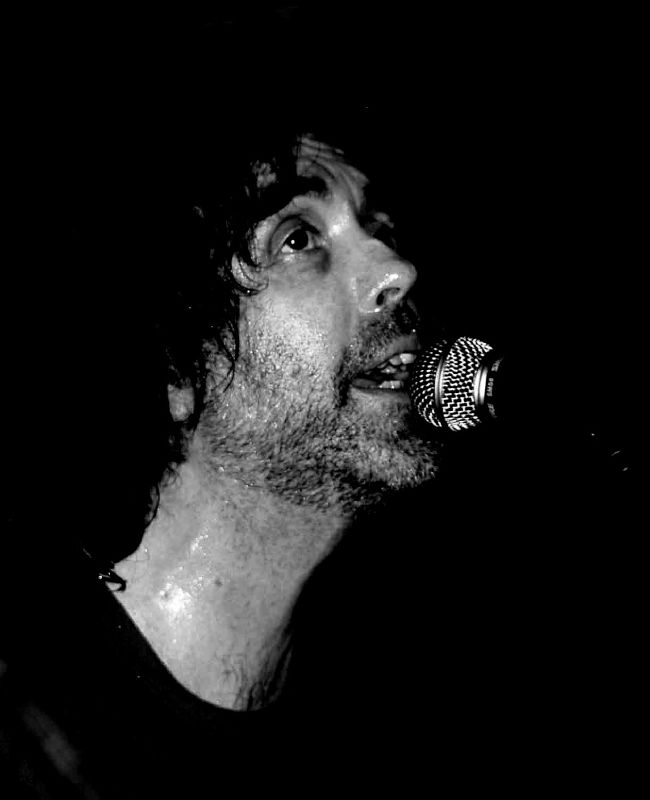
McNabb at the Metro Club, London

Around the time of the split of the Icicle Works in 1990, McNabb spent some time as a de facto member of the Wild Swans, playing guitar and singing background vocals. The Wild Swans dissolved in late 1990, and McNabb then issued two solo singles in 1991 to little notice. He then resurfaced in 1993 with a collection of demos which would form the basis of his first solo album, Truth and Beauty. Recorded on a shoestring budget in Oldham, Greater Manchester, it won him a record deal with Andrew Lauder's new 'This Way Up' Label.

The album's first single "If Love Was Like Guitars" became a minor UK hit in 1993. Following this, the 1991 single "Great Dreams of Heaven" was re-released. The next single pulled from the album, "I'm Game", failed to chart. "(I Go) My Own Way" was re-recorded with The Stone Roses producer John Leckie, but it too failed to significantly impact on the UK chart. Label boss Andrew Lauder then suggested that McNabb go to record in America, which McNabb was sceptical about. He facetiously suggested to Lauder that his new material sounded like Neil Young and Crazy Horse, and if Lauder could get Crazy Horse to play on the record, he would go to America. A few phone calls later, McNabb found himself in a Los Angeles studio with Crazy Horse drummer Ralph Molina and bassist Billy Talbot. This rhythm section appeared on four of the ten tracks on Head Like a Rock, including the No. 54 UK hit "You Must Be Prepared to Dream". The album's other single, "Go into the Light", did not feature Crazy Horse and peaked at UK No. 66.

Head Like a Rock was subsequently nominated for the 1994 Mercury Music Prize, and although M People would end up taking the award, Head Like A Rock peaked at No. 29 in the UK Albums Chart.

Molina and Talbot toured with McNabb in 1994, featuring on the short live bonus CD which accompanied his next album, Merseybeast (1996). This performance also featured Noel Gallagher of Oasis on uncredited rhythm guitar as the group covered The Seeds' "Pushin' Too Hard". Merseybeast saw McNabb with a new backing band called The Afterlife. The album's first single, "Don't Put Your Spell on Me" reached UK No. 72. The second single, the album's title track "Merseybeast" fared even worse, hitting UK No. 74.

In 1997, This Way Up parted company with McNabb, and released a 'best-of' collection entitled My Own Way: The Words & Music of Ian McNabb.

==== 1998–present: Fairfield Records era ====
On returning to performing his own material, McNabb focused on acoustic music, leading to a residency at the Birmingham club of Ronnie Scott. The material arising out of this became the low-key album A Party Political Broadcast on Behalf of the Emotional Party, released by McNabb on his own Fairfield label in 1998. Aside from McNabb, the only other musicians on the album were Waterboys Mike Scott and Anthony Thistlethwaite, and bassist Danny Thompson. The album also produced one single, "Little Princess" which failed to chart.

McNabb followed APPBOBOTEP with a live acoustic album, Live at Life (2000), compiled from a pair of Christmas gigs in 1999. The album included one newly written track, "Why Are the Beautiful So Sad", which continued to chronicle McNabb's dislike of celebrity culture as noted earlier in "Don't Patronise Me".

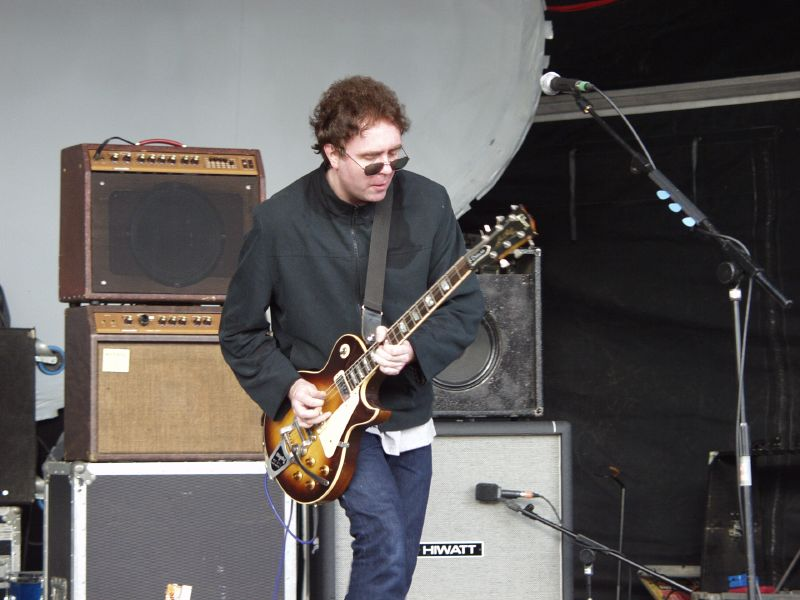
Ian McNabb Performing at Canterbury Festival 2003 Photo: Gerry Gardner

Ian McNabb (2001) marked McNabb's full-band return, and was issued by Sanctuary Records. The album's opening track, "Livin' Proof (Miracles Can Happen)", was written for the Go-Go's reunion which had recently taken place, but was declined by that band. McNabb's version was pressed as a promo single. The album was moderately received critically, with reviewers complaining of a lack of variety in the rock bombast of the record as compared to its two predecessors. 2001 also saw the issue of a demos and outtakes collection, Waifs and Strays.

McNabb returned to his own Fairfield label in 2002, and issued The Gentleman Adventurer.

Boots followed in 2003, the title being both McNabb's nickname (after his penchant for wearing Beatles-style boots in the mid-1980s while with The Icicle Works), and a reference to the 'official bootleg' nature of the release.

2004 saw McNabb issuing a second 'Best Of' album, Potency: The Best of Ian McNabb. This covered his whole solo oeuvre.

In 2005, McNabb successfully pushed a single, "Let The Young Girl Do What She Wants To" to No. 38 on the UK Singles Chart. This was McNabb's highest-ever chart placing as a solo artist, and his biggest hit since The Icicle Works' "Love Is a Wonderful Colour" reached No. 15 in early 1984, a span of over 21 years. This unexpected chart success was assisted considerably by his loyal fanbase buying several different formats of the single in an attempt to gain greater publicity and recognition for his then-current album, Before All of This. But despite support from a number of prominent DJs such as Jeremy Vine and Janice Long on BBC Radio 2, further widespread success continued to elude McNabb.

Later in 2005, McNabb released People Don't Stop Believin, an album of B-sides and outtakes from Before All of This.

In December 2007, McNabb's second live album, How We Live: At the Philharmonic, was issued. The album was culled from two June 2007 shows at Liverpool's Philharmonic Hall.

In January and February 2008, McNabb was involved with "The Number Ones Project", a concert and compilation album celebrating Liverpool's fifty-six No. 1 singles on the UK charts. McNabb played at the January concert, and subsequently appeared on the album, released in February, with his studio cover of John Lennon's "Woman".

In late 2008, McNabb participated in a concert reunion of City Lights. At the end of the year, McNabb released his autobiography, entitled Merseybeast: A Musical Memoir.

McNabb's eighth studio album, Great Things, was first made available at gigs in September 2009. As of November, it was made available for sale on McNabb's website. His ninth album, Little Episodes was available exclusively through his website beginning in February 2012. McNabb's tenth studio album, Eclectic Warrior, was created as a pledge music project, and was released on 18 March 2013. The Liverpudlian band Cold Shoulder played on the record, and toured with McNabb on the subsequent tour.

In June 2014, McNabb joined radio station 'Radio Wirral' and was appointed to host a regular Friday night slot from 10 pm until 12 midnight. This slot, titled 'The Ian McNabb Show', started broadcasting on 20 June 2014 and continued for a few months.

In August 2015, McNabb released the side album Krugerrands, his second release in collaboration with Cold Shoulder. He also revived The Icicle Works moniker and current lineup for a sporadic set of concerts throughout the rest of the year and on into 2016.

In March 2016, McNabb released his first album of covers, titled Respectfully Yours.

Star Smile Strong, his eleventh studio album, was released in April 2017, part 1 of a trilogy.

Our Future in Space, his twelfth studio album, was released in June 2018, part 2 of a trilogy.

McNabb released the double album Utopian (part 3 of a trilogy) in 2021 (with 20 tracks to celebrate his 20th studio album, starting with the five he recorded with the Icicle Works). Originally, the plan was to release the album in 2020 and then tour the country, but the pandemic changed this much to the chagrin of McNabb according to the posts on his blog.

On 11 October 2025, McNabb performed at the John Peel Centre for Creative Arts in Stowmarket, Suffolk. McNabb performed material from his solo albums, including past collaborations with Ringo Starr and Peter Buck of R.E.M.. The concert was part of a series of autumnal events across East Anglia focused on independent artists.

In November 2026 gigs planned on McNabb's solo tour were cancelled by his promoter following McNabb's public defence of convicted rapist and sex offender Russell Brand.

=== Collaborations with other artists ===
Around the time the "second generation" Icicle Works were winding down, McNabb became a de facto member of The Wild Swans, playing guitar and singing back-up vocals on their second studio album, 1990's Space Flower.

As well, he worked with Ian Broudie on Broudie's studio project The Lightning Seeds, providing backing vocals on the band's first three albums, released between 1990 and 1994. McNabb also co-wrote two songs with Broudie that wound up on The Lightning Seeds' second and third albums, 1992's Sense and 1994's Jollification.

1998 saw McNabb as part of a touring band for Mike Scott and The Waterboys, playing bass and sometimes keyboards. He also had occasion to serve as a touring bassist for one of his heroes, Ringo Starr, whose son Zak Starkey had had an early music industry break in 1988 when McNabb hired him to be a member of a late-running version of The Icicle Works.

McNabb has also contributed guitar on Amsterdam's album The Journey (2005) and Gary Cooke's debut album Songs for Everyday Use (2006).

== Personal life ==
McNabb runs a secondary social media account under the moniker "Chairman Boots - Vigiliant Citizen", where he shares his views, including 9/11 conspiracy theories, climate change scepticism, Big Pharma, the Military Industrial Complex, opposition to UK digital ID and other topics.

In 2020 he drew criticism over his views on British female musicians in a post over the Mercury Music Prize nominations.

=== Support for Russell Brand ===
In November 2026 on the day of the conviction of Russell Brand for rape and sexual assault, he posted on his social media accounts:

Russell Brand is being stitched up for his outspoken views ... I know people who were in his orbit and girls were throwing themselves at him every single night. If that happened to me, I know what I would do. Yer pays yer money you takes yer chance. If you want to hang out with the artist don’t cry when you’re in the picture. All these chicks who turn up at these situations know exactly what’s going on. The ones who decided they were done badly to – ten years after the event – are the worst.

The post was later deleted but not before screenshots were shared on social media. Later, on the evening after Brand's sentencing, he again posted on the same social media network:

I have been CANCELLED and therefore all my shows for the foreseeable future have also. This is as a result of post I made regarding the plight of the British comedian/ entertainer Russell Brand.

Again, this post was later deleted. One of the tour's promoters, Renegade Communications commented:

I hate cancelling gigs, and it's the first time in my career that I've had to do it, but not only can I not defend Ian McNabb's disgraceful socual media comments in support of Russsll Brand, as a husband and father of a young daughter, I simply cannot work with him moving forward.

It was reported later that day that the full UK tour had been cancelled after promoters had pulled the venues McNabb was due to play at. The Liverpool Beatles Museum, which had been set to induct McNabb and The Icicle Works into its Liverpool Legends Hall of Fame, cancelled its plans in response to the remarks.

== Solo discography ==
See Ian McNabb discography & List of songs recorded by Ian McNabb

=== Albums ===
- Truth and Beauty (1993)
- Head Like a Rock (1994)
- Merseybeast (1996)
- A Party Political Broadcast on Behalf of the Emotional Party (1998)
- Ian McNabb (2001)
- The Gentleman Adventurer (2002)
- Before All of This (2005)
- Great Things (2009)
- Little Episodes (2012)
- Eclectic Warrior (2013)
- Krugerrands (2015)
- Respectfully Yours (2016)
- Star Smile Strong (2017)
- Our Future in Space (2018)
- Utopian (2021)
- Ascending (2021)
- Nabby Road (2022)
- New Brighton Rock (2023)
- Fleetwood McNabb (2024)
- If It Wasn't for the Music (2025)
- 65 (2026)

=== Compilations of rarities, demos, etc. ===
- Waifs and Strays (2001)
- Boots (2003)
- People Don't Stop Believin (2005)
- Eclectic Warrior -- Demos (2013)
