= My Own Way: The Words & Music of Ian McNabb =

Greatest hits album by Ian McNabb
- Released: 1997
- Recorded: 1991–1997
- Genre: Pop
- Label: Blue Mountain Music/This Way Up
- Producer: Robert Ian McNabb

My Own Way: The Words & Music of Ian McNabb is Ian McNabb's first 'greatest hits' style compilation album. The album was released after McNabb left his Island Records label. The songs are compiled from his first three solo albums and the bonus disc 'North West coast'.

== Track listing ==
1. "(I Go) My Own Way" (5:19)
2. "Great Dreams of Heaven" (5:07)
3. "That's Why I Believe" (5:26)
4. "If Love Was Like Guitars" (5:06)
5. "These Are the Days" (4:29)
6. "For You, Angel"(7:45)
7. "You Must Be Prepared to Dream" (6:57)
8. "Child Inside a Father" (9:01)
9. "Potency" (4:37)
10. "Sad Strange Solitary Catholic Mystic" (4:46)
11. "Evangeline" (6:30)
12. "Camaraderie" (4:16)
13. "You Stone My Soul" (4:58)*
14. "I'm a Genius" (4:19)

Note: The album's cover notes list 'You Stone My Soul' as being 6:15 long but the version on the disc is a shorter 4:58 version.
