= Little Episodes =

Studio album by Ian McNabb
- Released: March 2012
- Recorded: 2011–2012
- Genre: Pop
- Length: 41:55
- Label: Fairfield
- Producer: Robert Ian McNabb

Ian McNabb chronology
Great Things (2009)	Little Episodes (2012)	Eclectic Warrior (2013)

Little Episodes is Ian McNabb's ninth solo album, only available through his official website. The album produced no singles, although a music video was released for the lead track 'Ancient Energy'.

== Track listing ==
1. "Ancient Energy" [6:00]
2. "Only Children" [3:35]
3. "High on a Hill" [4:08]
4. "He Wrote Himself a Letter" [3:15]
5. "Abigail Rain" [3:10]
6. "Tiny Arrows" [3:25]
7. "Little Episodes" [2:34]
8. "Irresistible Ruins" [1:07]
9. "A Heart That You Can Borrow" [3:16]
10. "To Love and To Let Go" [2:39]
11. "King of Hearts" [4:58]
12. "Little Episodes" (reprise) [3:10]
