= Sly Fox (band) =

American new wave duo

- Origin: Cincinnati, Ohio; New York City, U.S.
- Genres: New wave; dance-pop; synth funk
- Years active: 1985–1988; 1989
- Label: Capitol (1985–1988)
- Past members: Gary "Mudbone" Cooper; Michael Camacho

Sly Fox was an American new wave music duo, consisting of P-Funk vocalist Gary "Mudbone" Cooper and Michael Camacho. The duo came to prominence in the mid-1980s with their UK/US top 10 hit single "Let's Go All the Way". They released one studio album of the same name which charted within the US Top 40, and a couple of subsequent singles before breaking up.

== History ==
The duo was assembled by record producer Ted Currier, and presented as wholesome, clean-living teen idols. Cooper, a funk session musician, had previously been a vocalist with Parliament-Funkadelic and Bootsy's Rubber Band. Camacho was a protégé of David Bowie. The group's touring band included Cooper's former Rubber Band bandmates Frank "Kash" Waddy (drums), Joel "Razor Sharp" Johnson (keyboards), and Flip Cornett (guitar/bass), along with "Bad Boy Troy" Tipton (guitar), Greg Seay, and current Zapp keyboardist, Gregory Jackson.

Their sole studio album, Let's Go All the Way, was released on Capitol Records in December 1985. The title track became a top ten hit in both the US and UK in 1986.

The duo released three follow-up singles from the album, both of which charted. The freestyle track "Como Tu Te Llama" was a Dance Music/Club Play hit, spending nine weeks on that chart and reaching number 13. "Stay True" managed to dent the Hot 100, peaking at number 94 and "Don't Play with Fire" did not perform as well and sold poorly, but "Let's Go All the Way" proved to be their only lasting international mainstream success, branding them as one-hit wonders. The group disbanded in 1988.

In 1989, Sly Fox reformed briefly in Cincinnati, Ohio. With a demo budget from Bill Laswell, the duo recorded four songs, including Cooper's "There's No Place Like Home". The recording sessions included musicians James Ibold (guitarist/producer), Chris Sherman (bass), Casey McKeown (keyboards) and Johnny Miracle (drums). Previously unsettled artistic differences arose between the duo, and they abruptly separated again. Cooper returned to tour with George Clinton, while Camacho headed to Los Angeles to focus on a film career.

Since the dissolution of the group, Cooper has remained involved in the music industry. His most recent studio album, 2006's Fresh Mud, was a collaboration with Dave Stewart that combined blues and rap. Camacho has concentrated on acting, directing, and singing. He released the solo studio album Just for You in 2007. He is also a proprietor of a well-known jazz lounge and bar in New York City and has started a funk band named the Funky Foxes. The song "Let's Go All the Way" and its video retain their popularity in retro flashback programs and 1980s nights at dance clubs.

== Discography ==
=== Studio albums ===
Year	Album	Peak chart positions	
Year	Album	US	US R&B
1985	Let's Go All the Way	31	34

=== Singles ===
Year	Single	Peak chart positions				Album
Year	Single	US Pop	US R&B	US Dance	UK	Album
1985	"Let's Go All the Way"	7	57	—	3	Let's Go All the Way
1985	"Como Tu Te Llama"	―	―	13	—	Let's Go All the Way
1986	"Stay True"	94	—	―	―	Let's Go All the Way
1986	"Don't Play with Fire"	―	―	―	―	Let's Go All the Way
1987	"Merry-Go-Round"	—	—	—	—	Let's Go All the Way
"—" denotes releases that did not chart.

== See also ==
- Bootsy Collins
- Maceo Parker
