= Great Things (album) =

Studio album by Ian McNabb
- Released: 27 September 2009
- Recorded: 2009
- Genre: Pop
- Length: 40:16
- Label: Fairfield
- Producer: Robert Ian McNabb

Ian McNabb chronology
Before All of This (2005)	Great Things (2009)	Little Episodes (2012)

Great Things is the title of Ian McNabb's 8th solo album. The album officially produced no singles, although promotional singles of 'New Light' were pressed.

== Critical reception ==
Although the album failed to chart, it was highly praised by reviewers. Pete Whalley, writing for Getreadytorock.com said " Great Things demonstrates not only what a quality writer / performer McNabb is, but also serves to demonstrate how lightweight some of the current crop of singer songwriters are". Record Collector Magazine's Terry Staunton concluded that the "Tongue... in cheek" title of 'I Can't Help It If I'm Great' was "undeniably true" (In reference to McNabb), giving the album 4/5 stars.

== Track listing ==
1. "Great Things" [6:08]
2. "Empires End" [6:55]
3. "All About a Woman" [6:04]
4. "This Love" [4:51]
5. "Stormchaser" [4:32]
6. "New Light" [4:18]
7. "Pinin'" [4:29]
8. "I Can't Help It If I'm Great" [2:59]
