= Picture of Perfect Youth =

Compilation album by Feeder
- Released: 10 August 2004
- Recorded: 1996–2003
- Length: 132:06
- Label: Echo
- Producer: Feeder; Chris Sheldon; Gil Norton

Feeder chronology
Comfort in Sound (2002)	Picture of Perfect Youth (2004)	Pushing the Senses (2005)

Professional ratings
Review scores
Source	Rating
FHM	Positive link
Leeds Music Scene	link
Skinny's Music	5/5 stars
Q	4/5 stars
Rock Sound	8/10

Picture of Perfect Youth is a limited CD and vinyl collection of approximately half of Feeder's B-sides at the time of release. The official website sold out of the CD edition, though the album was re-released in March 2007. The vinyl edition remained available to buy, until the last of the stock sold out in late 2005.

The compilation was released with little fanfare; the only single on it was 2001's "Just a Day". However, the band's covers of singles "Can't Stand Losing You" and "The Power of Love"—originally released by The Police and Frankie Goes to Hollywood, respectively—are included. Feeder's cover of "The Power of Love" had been featured on the NME/War Child 1 Love compilation of covers of former UK number 1 singles.

Kerrang! rated the album 3/5 upon its initial release, but a review after the album's reissue from the same publication reduced the rating to 2/5. The re-release charted in the UK albums chart at #65. It also charted at number 3 in the UK Indie Chart.

== Track listing ==
=== Disc one ===
1. "Emily" - 4:44 ("Just A Day", 2001)
2. "Living In Polaroid" - 3:38 ("Insomnia", 1999)
3. "Opaque" - 3:58 ("Come Back Around", 2002)
4. "Power of Love" - 4:46 ("Just the Way I'm Feeling" / "NME in Association with War Child Presents 1 Love"), 2002)
5. "Broken" - 3:23 ("Just the Way I'm Feeling", 2003)
6. "Lose The Fear" - 3:13 ("Forget About Tomorrow", 2003)
7. "Remember the Silence" - 3:50 ("Find the Colour", 2003)
8. "Tomorrow Shine" - 5:04 ("Yesterday Went Too Soon", 1999)
9. "Purple" - 4:04 ("Buck Rogers", 2001)
10. "Space Age Hero" - 3:45 ("Insomnia", 1999)
11. "Can't Stand Losing You" - 3:11 ("Just A Day", 2001)
12. "Just A Day" - 4:04 ("Seven Days in the Sun / Just A Day", 2001)
13. "Slowburn" - 3:52 ("Just A Day", 2001)
14. "Elegy" - 4:06 ("Tangerine", 1997)
15. "21st Century Meltdown" - 3:03 ("Buck Rogers", 2001)
16. "Home For Summer" - 3:24 ("Seven Days in the Sun", 2001)
17. "Here In The Bubble" - 4:25 ("Crash", 1997)
18. "Forgiven" - 4:41 ("Cement", 1997)

=== Disc two ===
1. "Feel It Again" - 3:54 ("Come Back Around", 2002)
2. "Getting To Know You Well" - 3:16 ("Yesterday Went Too Soon", 1999)
3. "Whooey" - 3:56 ("Paperfaces", 1999)
4. "Bullet" - 2:53 ("Come Back Around", 2002)
5. "World Asleep" - 4:21 ("Stereo World", 1996)
6. "Rain" - 3:26 ("Tangerine", 1997)
7. "Eclipse" - 2:41 ("Suffocate", 1998)
8. "Oxidize" - 3:50 ("Yesterday Went Too Soon", 1999)
9. "Bad Hair Day" - 2:05 ("Turn", 2001)
10. "Come Back Around" - 3:26 ("Turn", 2001)
11. "Circles" - 3:00 ("Find the Colour", 2003)
12. "Spill" - 2:58 ("Suffocate", 1998)
13. "Rubberband" - 3:42 ("Yesterday Went Too Soon", 1999)
14. "Slider" - 3:25 ("Yesterday Went Too Soon", 1999)
15. "Can't Dance To Disco" - 3:01 ("Day In Day Out", 1999)
16. "TV Me" - 3:30 ("Tangerine", 1997)
17. "Wishing For The Sun" - 3:31 ("High", 1997)
18. "Undivided" - 4:06 ("Crash", 1997)

All of the B-Sides from the "Yesterday Went Too Soon", "Just A Day" and "Find the Colour" singles appear on this album.

"Come Back Around" - track 10 on disc 2 - is not to be confused with Feeder's hit single of the same name, a better-known song that was written and released a year after this song appears on the Turn single.

== Credits ==
All tracks written by Grant Nicholas, except "Power of Love" (written by Peter Gill, Holly Johnson, Brian Nash, and Mark O'Toole of Frankie Goes to Hollywood) and "Can't Stand Losing You" (written by Sting).
