= Buck Rogers (song) =

2001 single by Feeder

Single by Feeder

from the album Echo Park
- B-side: "Purple"; "Heads"; "We the Electronic"; "21st Century Meltdown"; "Sex Type Drug"
- Released: 8 January 2001
- Studio: Great Linford Manor
- Genre: Grunge
- Length: 3:13
- Label: Echo
- Songwriters: Taka Hirose; Jon Lee; Grant Nicholas
- Producers: Feeder; Gil Norton

Feeder singles chronology
"Paperfaces" (1999)	"Buck Rogers" (2001)	"Seven Days in the Sun" (2001)

"Buck Rogers" is a song by Welsh rock band Feeder. It was the first single to be taken from their third studio album, Echo Park (2001), and was released on The Echo Label. Released on 8 January 2001, the track reached number five on the UK Singles Chart and has since been certified platinum for sales and streaming figures exceeding 600,000 units. The group had originally not intended the track to be one of their own. Front man and main songwriter of the band Grant Nicholas had thought the song should be given to another band, but was convinced by producer Gil Norton and A&R staff of Echo that they could have a hit themselves, after hearing a demo recorded by Feeder while exploring a writing collaboration for SR-71.

The song title was inspired by the television show of the same name as Nicholas wanted to create a futuristic sound. Critical reaction was largely positive with the song being named one of Kerrang! magazine's "666 Songs You Must Own" in November 2004, and appearing on various other lists, despite NME giving a heavy negative reaction, claiming that the single would be "Lucky to reach the top 30". The music video for "Buck Rogers" was directed by Markus Walter and features footage of the group performing the song inside an elephant named "Daisy", situated in an underground car park.

== Background ==
The song was written by frontman Grant Nicholas for their third album Echo Park. During the year the band played festivals in the UK which previewed the material they were working on at the time, and would then play a series of small venues near the end of the year. Amongst the new songs they played, was their then forthcoming new single "Buck Rogers".

The song is about a relationship ending, specifically Nicholas' own relationship with his then girlfriend (who he later went on to marry), in which the character in the song meets a person named "Buck Rogers" who owns a "brand new car" that "looks like a Jaguar". His partner leaves him for the "Buck Rogers" character, which leads him to say "but I don't want to talk about it anymore", before looking on a positive side saying that he thinks he's going to make it through if he buys "a house in Devon", and starts "all over again" with her. The character then reunites with his friends to "drink cider from a lemon". Grant has said that the song employs an element of humour upon closer scrutiny.

The track's name came about when Nicholas was playing on a keyboard and invented a piece of music he said was "futuristic", and asked his engineer Matt Sime what to call the piece. They both thought "Buck Rogers" would sound appropriate for a working title which then stuck. The recorded demo was originally intended for another band, and Nicholas met with Gil with the intention of offering it to SR-71, but was convinced by producer Gil Norton not to part with the song as he believed the band could have a hit with it.

The first ever live performance of "Buck Rogers" at Glastonbury in 2000 featured the lyrics "Driving wheel to stone" instead of "Looks like a Jaguar", the song has been played at every gig on tour, one-off gigs and festivals, until the May 2008 tour, which saw the song dropped from setlists (excluding TV appearances and a gig supporting Coldplay), for the first time in its history. Since then the song has made a comeback into the bands sets. It also appeared in the video game Gran Turismo 3: A-Spec, the DVD and VHS versions of the 2003 Human Bodyboarding Teahupo'o Challenge, and in the 2001 film Behind Enemy Lines.

== Reception ==
In the United Kingdom the single was released on 8 January 2001 as two CD singles and a 7-inch vinyl single. The song was played on Radio 1 and appeared on their A-list, meaning the single would be in high rotation. On the day of single release, the band performed an in-store at the now closed London branch of Tower Records. Due to the single selling strongly during the course of the week, the band were invited onto The Pepsi Chart Show on Channel 5, and BBC One's Top of the Pops. The band were forced to cancel two signings as a result of this.

=== Chart performance ===
"Buck Rogers" entered the charts at number five in the United Kingdom, it went on to spend a second week in the top 10 at number eight. In South Africa, the track was very well received by radio DJs, reaching number one on the 5FM top 40. Later in the year the band were invited by the radio station as a headline act for their 26th birthday celebrations concert, due to the success the band had with them at the time.

After the top-five success of the single, Grant was asked in an April 2001 edition of a Feederweb fanzine if he felt under pressure to deliver another radio-friendly song, in reply he said:

"Not really, I think with the radio thing you have to be really careful; at the end of the day Feeder's not a typical daytime radio band, but what we've done is that we've proved that a guitar band – a British guitar band, and a band that doesn't have the profile of U2 or someone can still get into the top ten. It is possible!, it just seems to be that it's always the big American bands who sort of dominate the top ten; a Limp Bizkit or whatever, but saying that I think the whole Travis and Coldplay thing has been really good as sort of a stepping stone, and also I think people are getting fed up of just seeing Westlife or Steps on the TV. I think people are finding rock, and real bands again – I think that the market is currently so bombarded with pop stuff that we're just quite refreshing. Rock never went away, but it never really got the exposure. Hopefully it'll get "Seven Days in the Sun" away..."

Grant said in a 2005 Q magazine interview that he did not want to be remembered for it, as he said it is "a throwaway pop song" and he is more of a dark songwriter. Nonetheless, he said if it was not for the song, Feeder would not be here today.

=== All-time list appearances ===
"Buck Rogers" has made numerous appearances in the all-time lists conducted by Kerrang! magazine, and the radio station XFM. The track charted at number 37 in a December 2002 readers poll conducted by Kerrang!. This was later followed-up by four successive appearances in the annual XFM X-List, with a number 25 peak in 2004. Kerrang!'s writers have also approved of the track as one of the 666 Songs You Must Own, when it appeared at number five in the rock songs list in November 2004. In May 2009, listeners of XFM were invited to vote for their top 10 fave British singles of all-time; their top song would get 10 points, while their 10th song would get just the one with all the points added up to compile the order. "Buck Rogers" ended up at number 86 in their all-time top 100 list with "Just a Day" at number 81. "Buck Rogers" also features in the book The Xfm Top 1000 Songs of All Time.

== Music video ==
The video was shot in Berlin, Germany, in an underground car park and a sports complex. It starts with the band walking out from a spaceship, which is disguised as an elephant. During the first chorus after they walk out they are holding various fast food items, while looking around the velodrome looking complex, wondering where they have landed. After the chorus, shots of the band standing still in mid-air positions are shown, and then the band mostly performing the song in fast motion with occasional freeze-frame shots added in.

Before the last chorus, the band make their way back inside the elephant spaceship and look surprised as the inside is bigger than it looks on the outside. Here the band perform the last verse playing on instruments already inside the elephant, while the camera pans round the band before the screen turns black as the song ends at the same time.

== After "Buck Rogers" ==
Feeder continued to have chart success after "Buck Rogers", despite many critics labelling the band as one-hit wonders. Drummer Jon Lee died in January 2002 after taking his own life, before the band made their return to the live stage in August later that year, with the highlight being a well-received set on the second stage of the Reading Festival. Comfort in Sound became a success in their homeland and was recorded with Mark Richardson on drums. It propelled Feeder to a brief arena status which ended after Silent Cry fell behind sales expectations, but last played arenas in 2006, two years before the album was released.

After releasing three more top 10 albums from Comfort in Sound onwards, which included a singles album, Mark Richardson parted company to return to a reformed Skunk Anansie, before Karl Brazil joined the band as an unofficial member. He was later joined by Damon Wilson and Tim Trotter as additional session drummers. Brazil was the only drummer in that set-up to have recorded with the band, before 2016 saw Wilson leave the music industry to raise his family, while Trotter has not been heard of since. Geoff Holroyde drums with the band live and in the studio, with Brazil occasionally in the studio.

The Echo Label, who released "Buck Rogers", folded as a record label in 2008, leading to Feeder to search for a new deal. There were plans to release a tour only single, but contract obligations saw the release delayed. Although there were deals on the table, Feeder decided to create their own label Big Teeth Music in 2009, releasing two albums on the label before signing with Cooking Vinyl in 2016, Believe Music in 2019 then back to Big Teeth Music. In 2011, Matt Sime briefly retired from the music business only to work with the band again soon after.

== Track listings ==
UK CD1

1. "Buck Rogers" – 3:11
2. "Purple" – 4:03
3. "Heads" – 3:04

UK CD2

1. "Buck Rogers" – 3:11
2. "We the Electronic" – 4:00
3. "21st Century Meltdown" – 3:03
4. "Buck Rogers" (video)

UK 7-inch orange vinyl single and European CD single

1. "Buck Rogers" – 3:11
2. "Sex Type Drug" – 3:15

Australian CD single

1. "Buck Rogers" – 3:11
2. "We the Electronic" – 4:00
3. "21st Century Meltdown" – 3:03
4. "Purple" – 4:03
5. "Heads" – 3:04

== Charts ==
=== Weekly charts ===
Chart (2001)	Peak position
Europe (Eurochart Hot 100)	24
Scottish Singles Sales (Official Charts)	6
UK Singles (Official Charts)	5
UK Indie (Official Charts)	1

=== Year-end charts ===
Chart (2001)	Position
UK Singles (OCC)	160

== Certifications ==
Region	Certification	Certified units/sales
United Kingdom (BPI)	Platinum	600,000^{‡}
^{‡} Sales+streaming figures based on certification alone.

== Release history ==
Region	Date	Format(s)	Label(s)	Ref.
United Kingdom	8 January 2001	CD; 7-inch vinyl	Echo	
Australia	19 March 2001	CD	Festival Mushroom	
