= Seven Days in the Sun =

2001 single by Feeder

Single by Feeder

from the album Echo Park
- B-side: "Just a Day"; "Home for Summer"; "Reminders"; "Forever Glow"
- Released: 2 April 2001
- Length: 3:39
- Label: Echo
- Songwriters: Taka Hirose; Jon Lee; Grant Nicholas
- Producers: Feeder; Gil Norton

Feeder singles chronology
"Buck Rogers" (2000)	"Seven Days in the Sun" (2001)	"Turn" (2001)

Music video
- "Seven Days in the Sun" on YouTube

"Seven Days in the Sun" is a song by Welsh rock band Feeder, released as the second single from their Echo Park album. It was released on 2 April 2001 and reached number 14 on the UK Singles Chart the same month. CD1 of the single includes "Just a Day", which was later released as a single.

== Music video ==
The music video for the song features band members Grant Nicholas, Taka Hirose, and the late Jon Lee on a beach shot in Cape Town, South Africa, implementing various methods of reeling in some girls. Grant dresses up as a bike salesman, and gets the girls' passports in exchange for bicycles, Taka, a waiter in order to "demonstrate" his cooking skills, and Jon, in drag, possibly to show them his feminine side. However, it is only Grant that succeeds to impress. Nine years since the video was shot, Feeder released via their Facebook page previously unreleased behind-the-scenes footage.

== Track listings ==
UK CD1 and cassette single

1. "Seven Days in the Sun" (radio edit) – 3:31
2. "Just a Day" – 4:03
3. "Home for Summer" – 3:25

UK CD2

1. "Seven Days in the Sun" (album version) – 3:39
2. "Reminders" – 3:04
3. "Forever Glow" – 2:22
4. "Seven Days in the Sun" (video)

UK 7-inch blue-vinyl single

A. "Seven Days in the Sun" – 3:39
B. "Just a Day" – 4:03

Japanese CD single

1. "Seven Days in the Sun" (radio edit) – 3:31
2. "Satellite News" – 4:26
3. "Home for Summer" – 3:25
4. "Reminders" – 3:04
5. "Forever Glow" – 2:22
6. "We the Electronic" – 4:00
7. "W.I.T." – 2:31
8. "High" (acoustic) – 3:49
9. "Dry" (acoustic) – 3:49

== Charts ==
Chart (2001)	Peak position
Europe (Eurochart Hot 100)	54
Scotland Singles (OCC)	12
UK Singles (OCC)	14
UK Indie (OCC)	2

== Release history ==
Region	Date	Format(s)	Label(s)	Ref.
United Kingdom	2 April 2001	CD; cassette	Echo	
United Kingdom	9 April 2001	7-inch vinyl	Echo	
Japan	18 July 2001	CD	Echo	

== In popular culture ==
In 2001, the track appeared on the PAL-version soundtrack to the racing game Gran Turismo 3: A-Spec alongside two other Feeder songs: "Buck Rogers" and "Just a Day".
