= Come Back Around =

2002 single by Feeder

Single by Feeder

from the album Comfort in Sound
- B-side: "Feel It Again"; "Bullet"; "Opaque"
- Released: 30 September 2002
- Length: 3:12
- Label: Echo
- Songwriter: Grant Nicholas
- Producers: Gil Norton; Grant Nicholas

Feeder singles chronology
"Just a Day" (2001)	"Come Back Around" (2002)	"Just the Way I'm Feeling" (2003)

"Come Back Around" is the first single released from Welsh rock band Feeder's fourth studio album, Comfort in Sound (2002). It was their first release after drummer Jon Lee's death earlier in the year and reached number 14 on the UK Singles Chart, becoming the band's 10th top-40 hit in the process. It also reached number 45 in Ireland. The promo video features four female drummers as a tribute to Jon Lee.

Feeder also have a B-side with the same name which was released two years later on their B-sides album, "Picture of Perfect Youth", in 2004.

== Reception ==
"Come Back Around" charted at number 14 on the UK Singles Chart and number 45 on the Irish Singles Chart. The track appeared at number 103 on XFM's all-time list "The X-List" in 2003, being very popular with comedians Ricky Gervais, Karl Pilkington & Stephen Merchant during their time at the station and alongside its video was number 35 on MTV Two's top 100 videos of 2002. The track gained a lot of critical success upon release, with Kerrang! naming it their "Single of the Week". It is played very regularly at Feeder concerts and festival appearances.

== Music video ==
With "Come Back Around" being Feeder's first single after Jon's death, the band wanted to make it a tribute to him. Frontman Grant Nicholas knew that Jon would like the idea of a series of women playing drums together, and so a group of female drummers appeared in the video, all playing at the same time with Grant Nicholas and Taka Hirose both in their usual band roles, facing towards the drummers. To keep the video low-key, it was also filmed in black and white. Effects in the video include Grant playing his guitar in a windmill motion for a few seconds, and Taka jumping off an equipment box with the landing done in slow motion.

Jon often complained that there were no girls in their videos. The drumming was shot in slow motion in order to make it almost perfect with each of the four drummers. The video visually shows the message that no matter how many drummers they had, and no matter how each beat was hit in time, they would never be the same as Jon. A screen-grab from the video, showing Grant jumping in the air, appears as the cover for the later-released Singles compilation album.

== Track listings ==
UK CD1

1. "Come Back Around" – 3:12
2. "Feel It Again" – 3:53
3. "Bullet" – 2:53

UK CD2

1. "Come Back Around" – 3:12
2. "Opaque" – 3:56
3. "Come Back Around" (acoustic session) – 3:20
4. "Come Back Around" (video)

UK DVD single

1. "Come Back Around" (video)
2. "Come Back Around—Lyric Screen" (audio) – 3:12
3. "Opaque—Photo Gallery" (audio) – 3:56
4. "Suffocate" (video) – 0:30
5. "High" (video) – 0:30
6. "Tangerine" (video) – 0:30
7. "Stereo World" (video) – 0:30

== Charts ==
Chart (2002)	Peak position
Europe (Eurochart Hot 100)	51
Ireland (IRMA)	45
Scotland Singles (OCC)	12
UK Singles (OCC)	14
UK Indie (OCC)	1

== Release history ==
Region	Date	Format(s)	Label(s)	Ref.
United Kingdom	30 September 2002	CD; DVD	Echo	
Australia	2 December 2002	CD	Echo; Festival Mushroom	
United States	21 April 2003	Mainstream rock; active rock; alternative radio	Universal	
