= Just a Day =

2001 single by Feeder

Single by Feeder
- B-side: "Can't Stand Losing You"; "Emily"; "Slowburn"
- Released: 10 December 2001
- Length: 3:45
- Label: Echo
- Songwriters: Grant Nicholas; Jon Lee; Taka Hirose
- Producers: Grant Nicholas; Feeder

Feeder singles chronology
"Piece by Piece" (2001)	"Just a Day" (2001)	"Come Back Around" (2002)

Music video
- "Just a Day" on YouTube "Just a Day 2 (2020 Version)" on YouTube

"Just a Day" is a song by Welsh rock band Feeder, released as the band's final single of 2001, notable for being their last with drummer Jon Lee. It was first released on the "Seven Days in the Sun" single as a B-side. Despite having already appeared in the top 20 earlier in the year as a B-side, the single A-side release stayed in the UK top 20 for four weeks, peaking at number 12. It also peaked at number 47 in Ireland. It instantly became a regular to end the band's live sets, but has been occasionally rested from this position for a cover of "Breed" by Nirvana, while never used as one of the "Feeder covers" at Renegades gigs. As of November 2023, "Just a Day" has total consumption figures of 400,000, allowing it to be certified Gold.

Feeder's performance of "Just a Day" on CD:UK in December 2001 was Feeder's last with Jon Lee. After filming for the performance wrapped, Lee left the studio premises on the back of a moped to travel to an airport, as he would spend Christmas and indeed his final days at his Miami home. This would be the last time frontman Grant Nicholas would see Lee. The week Lee died, the band were due to appear on Top of the Pops performing "Can't Stand Losing You", a cover of the Police which appears on CD1 of this EP. Their place was taken by Ash performing "There's a Star". Before the release of the single, Feeder had already appeared on Later... with Jools Holland for the first time. This would be the last time Jon would perform with the band in a live setting as CD:UK was not fully live, they ended the show with the aforementioned "Can't Stand Losing You".

== History ==
Feeder had already enjoyed a successful 2001 by the time "Just a Day" was released as a stand-alone single on 10 December 2001. "Buck Rogers" had given them their first top 10 single and had then repeated the success with the attendant album Echo Park.

"Just a Day" stayed in the UK top 20 for four uninterrupted weeks and featured on "Seven Days in the Sun", as a B-side after being originally planned for their 1999 album Yesterday Went Too Soon. It later was included on their 2006 compilation album The Singles, making it the first time the radio edit version of the track was on an album. The song describes the loneliness of alcoholism and depression.

The single was also released as an orange vinyl, with a Brian Sperber mix of the main track as its A-side although the differences are hardly noticeable.

This song was also featured and used in the opening of 2001 video game Gran Turismo 3 A-spec (PAL version only)

== Critical reception ==
Drowned in Sound rated the single 7/10, with reviewer James Westfox saying that although readers might dislike Feeder, the song is "a difficult record to dislike." NME also reviewed the EP, although reviewer Christian Ward focused his attention on the B-side "Can't Stand Losing You". Sputnikmusic said that "Just a Day" was an "almighty radio single" and "really worth having".

== Music video ==
The video shows various fans miming to the song in their bedrooms. It started off as a competition on the band's website, in which fans had to send in an unedited video of themselves and the director chose the best ones. After being notified that they were successful, they were then advised to refrain from posting on any public internet forum until the release of the video.

Despite the mixed reception the video has within the fanbase, it gained cult classic status. It also became an inspiration to Jetplane Landing and Canadian rock band the Barenaked Ladies, for their videos to "Brave Gravity" and "Wind it Up" respectively.

Fans critical of the video often mention that the fans' voices singing over the track makes the video hard to enjoy. The idea of this was inspired by the idea of the song playing on a small 2-speaker tape player with the fan in question singing along to it.

=== 2020 version ===
On 8 April 2020, the band posted a fifteen-second video on YouTube inviting fans to submit their own video, to offer support to those affected by the COVID-19 pandemic.

As a result, a remake version of the music video was created and uploaded 22 days later. The video featured updated appearances of a small number of participants from the original 2001 music video, fans who had not appeared in the original video and submissions from key workers such as NHS staff.

On every date of the late 2025 Comfort in Sound tour, this version alongside the original was played side-by-side behind the band on the backlit projection screen, during every performance of the song.

== All-time list appearances ==
- Number 48 on XFM's "X-list" in 2006.
- Number 81 on XFM's Top 100 British Singles list in May 2009.
- Number 89 on XFM's Top 1000 All-Time Singles list in December 2009.

== Track listings ==
CD1 and cassette

1. "Just a Day" (edit) – 3:45
2. "Can't Stand Losing You" – 3:09
3. "Piece by Piece" (video CD-ROM)

CD2

1. "Just a Day" (full length) – 4:03
2. "Emily" – 4:43
3. "Slowburn" – 3:50
4. "Just a Day" (video CD-ROM)

7-inch orange-vinyl single

1. "Just a Day" (Alan Moulder mix) – 3:51
2. "Emily" – 4:43

== Charts ==
Chart (2001–2002)	Peak position
Europe (Eurochart Hot 100)	79
Ireland (IRMA)	47
Scottish Singles Sales (Official Charts)	12
UK Singles (Official Charts)	12
UK Indie (Official Charts)	3

== Certifications ==
Region	Certification	Certified units/sales
United Kingdom (BPI)	Gold	400,000^{‡}
^{‡} Sales+streaming figures based on certification alone.
