= Post-Britpop =

Alternative rock subgenre

- Stylistic origins: Alternative rock; Britpop
- Cultural origins: Late 1990s, United Kingdom
- Typical instruments: Bass; drums; guitar; keyboards; vocals

Regional scenes
- England; Northern Ireland; Scotland; Wales

Other topics
- Cool Britannia; Cool Cymru

Post-Britpop is an alternative rock subgenre and is the period in the late 1990s and early 2000s, following Britpop, when the media were identifying a "new generation" or "second wave" of guitar bands influenced by acts like Oasis and Blur, but with less overt British concerns in their lyrics, more introspective songwriting, and greater influences from experimental music and American indie rock.

Bands that had been established acts in the Britpop era, but gained greater prominence under post-Britpop, included Radiohead and the Verve. Meanwhile, newer acts such as Keane, Snow Patrol, Stereophonics, and particularly Travis and Coldplay, achieved much wider international success than most of the Britpop groups that had preceded them, and were some of the most commercially successful acts of the late 1990s and early 2000s.

== Characteristics ==
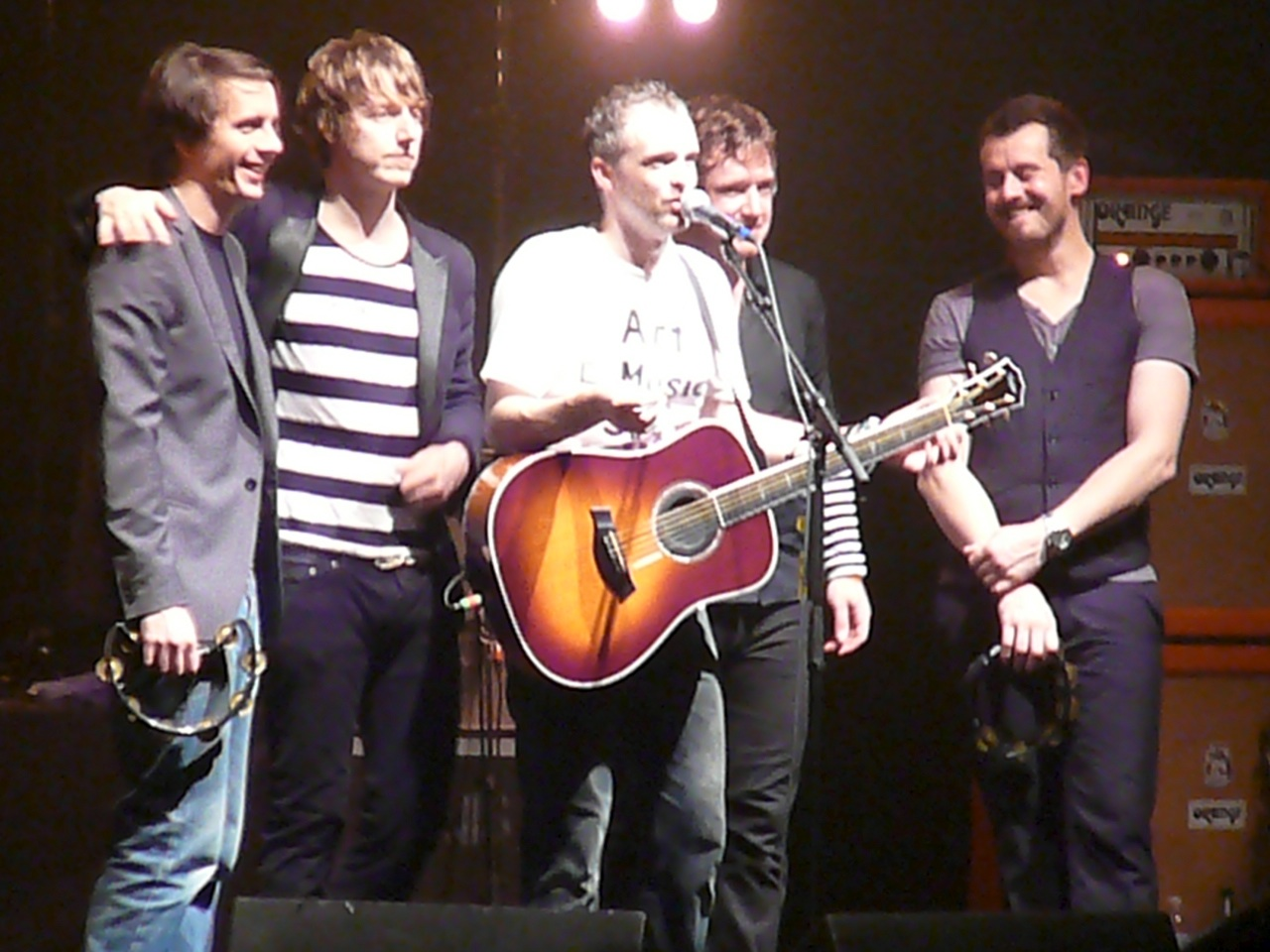
Travis, one of the first bands in the post-Britpop era to enjoy international success, performing in Los Angeles in 2007.

Many bands in the post-Britpop era avoided the Britpop label while still producing music derived from it. The music of most bands was guitar-based, often mixing elements of 1960s–70s British pop and traditional rock (i.e. the Beatles, the Rolling Stones and the Small Faces) with American indie rock influences.

Drawn from across the United Kingdom, the themes of their music tended to be less parochially centred on British, English and London life, and more introspective than had been the case with Britpop at its height. This, beside a greater willingness to woo the American press and fans, may have helped a number of them in achieving international success. They have also been seen as presenting the image of the rock star as an ordinary person, or "boy-next-door".

== History ==
=== Origins ===
Pitchfork wrote that the Radiohead songs "Fake Plastic Trees" and "High and Dry", from their 1995 album The Bends, anticipated post-Britpop. From about 1997, as dissatisfaction grew with Cool Britannia and Britpop began to dissolve, emerging bands began to avoid the Britpop label while producing music derived from it. Bands that had enjoyed success in the mid-1990s but which did not find major success until the late 1990s included the Verve and Radiohead. After the decline of Britpop, they began to gain more attention. The Verve's album Urban Hymns (1997) was a worldwide hit and their commercial peak before they broke up in 1999, while Radiohead achieved acclaim with their experimental albums OK Computer (1997), Kid A (2000), and Amnesiac (2001).

=== Developing scenes ===
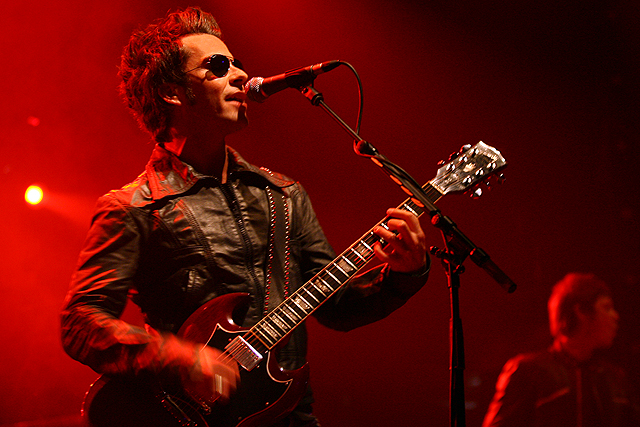
Kelly Jones of Stereophonics in Hamburg, Germany, in 2007

In the wake of OK Computer, new artists in the vein of its melancholic sound began to emerge. Travis, from Glasgow, Scotland, were one of the first major rock bands to emerge in the post-Britpop era. Using the hooks and guitar rock favoured by Oasis in a song-based format, they moved from the personal on Good Feeling (1997), through the general on their breakthrough The Man Who (1999), to the socially conscious and political on 12 Memories (2003) and have been credited with a major role in disseminating post-Britpop. From Edinburgh Idlewild, initially more influenced by grunge and punk rock, just failed to break into the British top 50 with their debut album Hope Is Important (1998). However, after switching to a more accessible indie sound, they produced three top 20 albums, peaking with The Remote Part (2002), and the single "You Held the World in Your Arms", reaching numbers 3 and 9 in the respective UK charts. Although garnering some international attention, they did not break through in the US.

Stereophonics, from Cwmaman, Wales, used elements of Britpop on their breakthrough albums Word Gets Around (1997) and Performance and Cocktails (1999), before moving into more melodic post-Britpop territory with Just Enough Education to Perform (2001) and subsequent albums. Also from Wales were Newport's Feeder, who were initially more influenced by American post-grunge, producing a hard rock sound that led to their breakthrough single "Buck Rogers" and the album Echo Park (2001). After the death of their drummer Jon Lee, they moved to a more reflective and introspective mode on Comfort in Sound (2002), their most commercially successful album to that point, which spawned a series of hit singles.

There were also a number of British bands incorporating more progressive and art rock sounds into their music style. Radiohead released OK Computer in May 1997, a few months before Oasis released Be Here Now (known as 'the album that killed Britpop' in some parts of the press), while Mansun released the album Six the next year. At the end of the 1990s, Devon band Muse would emerge from Teignmouth. Initially dismissed in certain sections of the press as Radiohead imitators, the band would go on to top the UK albums chart seven times, with every studio album reaching the top from 2003 to 2022.

=== Commercial peak ===
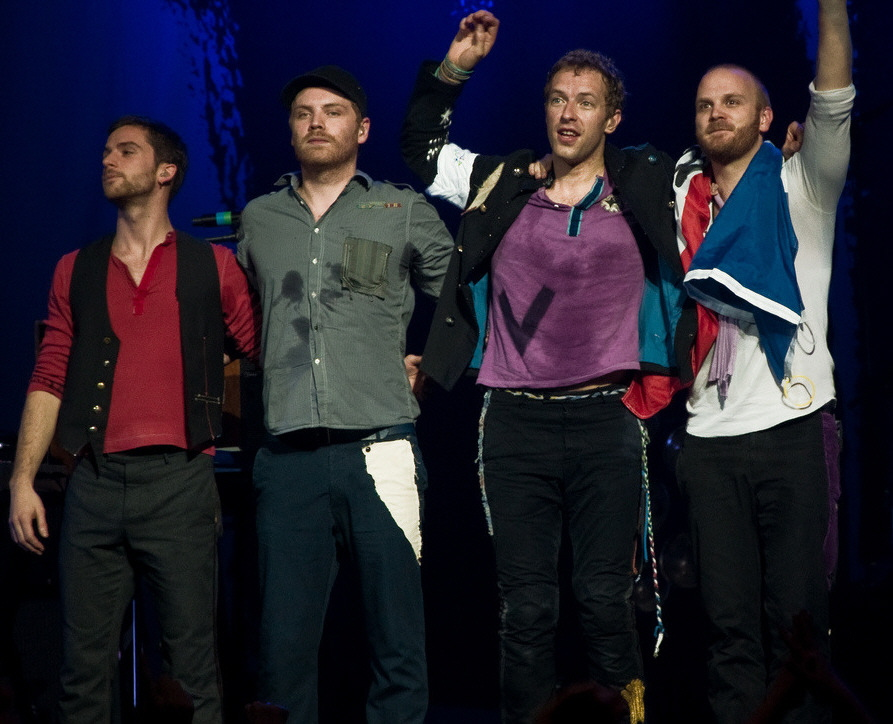
Coldplay, the most commercially successful post-Britpop band to date, on stage in 2008.

These acts were followed by a number of bands who shared aspects of their music, including Snow Patrol from Northern Ireland, and Athlete, Elbow, Embrace, Starsailor, Doves, Gomez, and Keane from England. The most commercially successful band in the millennium were Coldplay, whose first two albums Parachutes (2000) and A Rush of Blood to the Head (2002) went multi-platinum, establishing them as one of the most popular acts in the world by the time of their third album X&Y (2005). Snow Patrol's "Chasing Cars" (from their 2006 album Eyes Open) is the most widely played song of the 21st century on UK radio.

=== Fragmentation ===
Post-Britpop bands like Coldplay, Starsailor and Elbow, with introspective lyrics and even tempos, began to be criticised by the mid-2000s as bland and sterile. A wave of garage rock revival/post-punk revival bands sprang up in response, like the Strokes and the White Stripes in the US, the Hives in Sweden, the Vines in Australia, and the UK's own Kaiser Chiefs, Arctic Monkeys and Bloc Party. These bands have been seen as looking less to music of the 1960s and more to 1970s punk and post-punk, while still being influenced by Britpop, and were welcomed by some in musical press as "the saviours of rock and roll". Despite this, a number of post-Britpop groups, particularly Travis, Stereophonics and Coldplay, continued to record and enjoy commercial success into the late 2000s.

== Significance ==
Bands in the post-Britpop era have been credited with revitalising the British rock music scene in the late 1990s and 2000s, and of reaping the commercial benefits opened up by Britpop. They have also been criticised for providing a "homogenised and conformist" version of Britpop that serves as music for TV soundtracks, shopping malls, bars and nightclubs.

== See also ==
- 1990s music in the United Kingdom
- 2000s music in the United Kingdom
- Music of the United Kingdom
- Britpop
- Post-punk revival
