= Turn (Feeder song) =

2001 single by Feeder

Single by Feeder

from the album Echo Park
- B-side: "Come Back Around"; "Bring It Home"; "Bad Hair Day"; "San Diego"
- Released: 2 July 2001
- Length: 4:30
- Label: Echo
- Songwriter(s): Grant Nicholas
- Producer(s): Feeder; Gil Norton

Feeder singles chronology
"Seven Days in the Sun" (2001)	"Turn" (2001)	"Piece by Piece" (2001)

"Turn" is a song by Welsh rock band Feeder, released as the third single from their third studio album, Echo Park (2001), on 2 July 2001. The song reached number 27 in the UK Singles Chart and led to Echo Park re-entering the top 75 due to the pre-release airplay and stocking of the single on release week. It was also the band's third successive top-30 single, the first time this had happened in their career.

The track called "Come Back Around" on CD1 is not the same song as the single from Comfort in Sound, released a year later, but a different song. When "Come Back Around" was mentioned as a new single, there was an initial confusion among fans thinking it was a new version of the same song. The title track related to Grant Nicholas's experiences of being away while on tour.

== Track listings ==
UK CD1

1. "Turn" (full length version) – 4:38
2. "Come Back Around" – 3:26
3. "Bring It Home" – 3:59
4. "Turn" (video)

UK CD2

1. "Turn" (radio edit) – 3:58
2. "Bad Hair Day" – 2:03
3. The making of Echo Park (video and audio track) – 7:00

UK cassette single

1. "Turn" (radio edit) – 3:58
2. "Bring It Home" – 3:59
3. "San Diego" – 3:26

UK limited-edition 7-inch purple vinyl single

A. "Turn" (radio edit) – 3:58
B. "Come Back Around" – 3:26

== Charts ==
Chart (2001)	Peak position
Europe (Eurochart Hot 100)	97
Scotland (OCC)	21
UK Singles (OCC)	27
UK Indie (OCC)	1
