= Yorktown Heights (album) =

Studio album by Grant Nicholas
- Released: 11 August 2014 (UK); 23 July 2014 (JAP)
- Recorded: 2013
- Genre: Acoustic; folk rock; alternative rock; pop rock
- Length: 54:58
- Label: Popping Candy (UK); Victor (Japan)
- Producer: Grant Nicholas

Yorktown Heights was the only solo album by Feeder frontman Grant Nicholas. The album was released on 11 August 2014 in the United Kingdom and recorded during 2013, being a year after Nicholas announced at Feeder's final show of 2012 at the Brixton Academy that the band would be taking a break. It was with the first airplay of "Soul Mates" on the BBC Radio 2 show The Dermot O'Leary Show on 31 May 2014, that Grant's solo career made its radio debut.

Grant would tour the album at the end of 2014 after two one off shows before its release. After a 2015 tour, a mini-album titled Black Clouds was released before the "Everyday Society" single was released for Record Store Day, bringing Grant's solo career to a close. Feeder later resumed activity with their 2016 album All Bright Electric, and the 2017 compilation album The Best of Feeder which included new material on the bonus album Arrow. Both albums featured tracks originally intended for the solo album, but were re-recorded for Feeder ("Slint" and "Veins", which maintains the original vocal track). Some have yet to see the light of day, being "Rats" and "The Wall's Around Us".

Grant would in 2015 after bringing his solo career to an end, make this official by closing down Popping Candy and Big Teeth Music, before then closing down his solo career website and Twitter handle.

== Track listing ==
All tracks are written by Grant Nicholas.

UK release
No.	Title	Length
1.	"Soul Mates"	3:21
2.	"Hitori"	3:20
3.	"Tall Trees"	5:03
4.	"Robots"	3:47
5.	"Vampires"	3:55
6.	"Good Fortune Lies Ahead"	2:01
7.	"Joan of Arc"	3:58
8.	"Hope"	3:22
9.	"Isolation"	3:36
10.	"Broken Resolutions"	4:07
11.	"Time Stood Still"	3:14
12.	"Father To Son"	4:22
13.	"Counting Steps"	4:02
14.	"Silent in Space"	3:32
15.	"Safe in Place"	3:18

== Reception ==
Professional ratings
Review scores
Source	Rating
Classic Rock	6/10 stars
Digital Fix	6/10 stars
Drowned In Sound	7/10 stars
GigSlutz	4/5 stars
Renowned for Sound	4/5 stars
SeenItHeardIt	4/5 stars

Early reviews for the album have been positive, with Renowned For Sound giving it a 4/5, describing it as "a very introvert and self reflecting record" and calling it "a first solo effort he can be proud of." GigSlutz also gave the record a 4/5, commenting that "it continues to surprise and sounds fresh throughout" and concluding that "fans of Feeder and Grant Nicholas will not be disappointed."

== Chart performance ==
Chart (2014)	Peak position
Official Albums Chart	29
