= Just the Way I'm Feeling =

2003 single by Feeder

Single by Feeder

from the album Comfort in Sound
- B-side: "Broken"; "The Power of Love"; "Redemption"; "Child in You" (acoustic)
- Released: 13 January 2003
- Length: 4:22
- Label: Echo
- Songwriter: Grant Nicholas
- Producers: Grant Nicholas; Gil Norton

Feeder singles chronology
"Come Back Around" (2002)	"Just the Way I'm Feeling" (2003)	"Forget About Tomorrow" (2003)

"Just the Way I'm Feeling" is a song by Welsh rock band Feeder, released as the second single from their fourth album, Comfort in Sound (2002). The song reached number 10 on the UK Singles Chart, giving drummer Mark Richardson his first UK top-10 appearance with the band. One of the B-sides, "The Power of Love", is a Frankie Goes to Hollywood cover and was recorded for the NME's War Child charity album 1 Love.

== Reception ==
"Just the Way I'm Feeling" charted at number 10 on the UK Singles Chart and gained over 15,000 plays on UK radio. On 17 June 2022, it was certified silver by the British Phonographic Industry (BPI) for 200,000 sales and digital streaming figures combined. The single helped the parent album, Comfort in Sound, sell over 300,000 units in the UK, enabling it to certified platinum. The record reached this required number, when follow-up "Forget About Tomorrow" was released. However, frontman Grant Nicholas once said in an interview that it was this single that helped the album become successful.

== Music video ==
The video shows various colourised clips of 1920s–1960s movies with various shots of the band playing by day and next by night and finally by day. The man in the suit and kiss of life sequence are taken from a public information first aid film called "Don't let him die".

=== Synopsis ===
A lonely woman looks at the window, watching the rain. Her husband comes home from a rainy day from work. But when the woman, seeing that he's home, is about to look at him, the man runs away who finds another woman who is drowning and the man saves her. A crowd is gathered up to see the event. He saves her, but is hallucinated. The next scene shows the same woman having a dream to a city with various people (such as two men fighting, a tiger running away, etc.). Soon the dream turns into a nightmare. Soon the sky turns red, with another woman in a black swimming suit (who is amazed). Next, a clip with Harry Houdini is committed to sacrifice himself. Shortly after that, the same woman wakes up who is happy to the man is home and soon have fun together on a beach. They come to a plane which leaves home. Soon the man and woman hold hands and look at the skyline as the plane leaves. The video ends with a shot of grass and an old-style "The End" title appears on the screen.

== B-side: "Broken" ==
B-side "Broken" was remixed in 2003 by Dutch remixer Junkie XL, changing the name to "Clouds". The song was once again influenced by another artist, when in 2006 Italian singer Zucchero released an album in Italy titled "Fly" and included a track titled "L'amore è nell'aria". The track used exactly the same instrumental but was re-recorded rather than sampled from the original source material. Grant Nicholas was credited with permission given by the record company nine months before the recording was made.

== Track listings ==
UK CD1

1. "Just the Way I'm Feeling" (album version) – 4:21
2. "Broken" – 3:22
3. "The Power of Love" – 4:45

UK CD2

1. "Just the Way I'm Feeling" (radio edit) – 4:02
2. "Redemption" – 2:30
3. "Child in You" (acoustic living room session) – 3:25
4. "Just the Way I'm Feeling" (video)

UK DVD single

1. "Just the Way I'm Feeling" (lyric screen)
2. "Good Evening Reading" (video documentary)
3. "Just the Way I'm Feeling" (acoustic) photo gallery
4. "Insomnia" (video clip)
5. "Yesterday Went Too Soon" (video clip)
6. "Day In Day Out" (video clip)
7. "Paperfaces" (video clip)

Australian and New Zealand maxi-CD single

1. "Just the Way I'm Feeling" (edit) – 4:02
2. "Broken" – 3:22
3. "The Power of Love" – 4:45
4. "Redemption" – 2:36
5. "Come Back Around" (acoustic) – 3:20
6. "Just the Way I'm Feeling" (video)

== Charts ==
=== Weekly charts ===
Weekly chart performance for "Just the Way I'm Feeling"
Chart (2003)	Peak position
Europe (Eurochart Hot 100)	34
Scotland Singles (OCC)	10
UK Singles (OCC)	10
UK Indie (OCC)	5

=== Year-end charts ===
Year-end chart performance for "Just the Way I'm Feeling"
Chart (2003)	Position
UK Singles (OCC)	192

== Certifications ==
Certifications and sales for "Just the Way I'm Feeling"
Region	Certification	Certified units/sales
United Kingdom (BPI)	Silver	200,000^{‡}
^{‡} Sales+streaming figures based on certification alone.

== Release history ==
Release dates and formats for "Just the Way I'm Feeling"
Region	Date	Format(s)	Label(s)	Ref(s).
United Kingdom	13 January 2003	CD	Echo	
United States	8 March 2004	Hot adult contemporary radio	Universal	
