= Forget About Tomorrow =

2003 single by Feeder

Single by Feeder

from the album Comfort in Sound
- B-side: "Lose the Fear"; "Tinseltown" (acoustic)
- Released: 5 May 2003
- Length: 3:51
- Label: Echo
- Songwriter: Grant Nicholas
- Producer: Gil Norton

Feeder singles chronology
"Just the Way I'm Feeling" (2003)	"Forget About Tomorrow" (2003)	"Find the Colour" (2003)

"Forget About Tomorrow" is the third single to be taken from Welsh rock band Feeder's fourth studio album, Comfort in Sound (2002). The single charted at number 12 on the UK Singles Chart. In 2017, the single was re-released as a Record Store Day vinyl. This release charted at number nine on the UK Physical Singles Chart.

== Track listings ==
UK CD1

1. "Forget About Tomorrow" – 3:50
2. "Lose the Fear" – 3:12
3. "Tinseltown" (acoustic) – 4:11
4. "Forget About Tomorrow" (video/enhanced section)

UK CD2

1. "Forget About Tomorrow" – 3:50
2. "Bring It Together" – 2:42
3. "Helium" (acoustic) – 2:56
4. "Forget About Tomorrow" (alternative video)

UK DVD single

1. A Cast of Thousands (live at Brixton Academy documentary)
2. "Forget About Tomorrow" (lyric screen) – 3:50
3. "Godzilla Goes to Mars" (Feeder fan gallery) – 2:10
4. "Cement" (video clip) – 0:30
5. "Crash" (video clip) – 0:30
6. "Can't Stand Losing You" (live at Reading 2001 video clip) – 0:30
7. "Piece by Piece" (European version video clip) – 0:30

Australian CD single

1. "Forget About Tomorrow" – 3:50
2. "Lose the Fear" – 3:12
3. "Tinseltown" (acoustic) – 4:11
4. "Bring It Together" – 2:42
5. "Helium" (acoustic) – 2:56

== Charts ==
Chart (2003)	Peak position
Europe (Eurochart Hot 100)	52
Scotland Singles (OCC)	13
UK Singles (OCC)	12
UK Indie (OCC)	2

Chart (2017)	Peak position
UK Physical Singles (OCC)	9

== Release history ==
Region	Date	Format(s)	Label(s)	Ref.
United Kingdom	5 May 2003	CD	Echo	
Australia	21 July 2003	CD	Festival Mushroom	
