= All Bright Electric =

Studio album by Feeder
- Released: 21 September 2016
- Recorded: 2015–16
- Genre: Alternative rock
- Length: 41:54
- Label: Cooking Vinyl
- Producer: Todd Kinnon (uncredited); Tim Roe; Feeder

Feeder chronology
Generation Freakshow (2012)	All Bright Electric (2016)	The Best of Feeder / Arrow (2017)

Singles from All Bright Electric
- 1. "Universe of Life" Released: 15 July 2016; 2. "Eskimo" Released: 25 August 2016; 3. "Another Day on Earth / Paperweight" Released: 17 March 2017

All Bright Electric is the ninth studio album by Welsh rock band Feeder. It was released on 21 September 2016 in Japan and on 7 October 2016 in the UK. Three singles were released from the album, "Universe of Life", "Eskimo" and "Another Day on Earth". The first two of these were Gratis singles from pre-orders of the albums, while the last single was a streaming-track only although no download was released. "Paperweight" had a video made for it but is not classified as a single.

== Release ==
On 4 July 2016, the band released a short video announcing the dates of a September–October tour, along with a preview of an upcoming song. On 15 July 2016, the band announced the new album. On the same day, they premiered the album's lead single, 'Universe of Life'. Grant Nicholas commented on the album: "I wanted the album to really capture Feeder's heart and soul. For us the journey the music takes the listener on is still so important, and that is what still drives me to make the best music we can" and described its recording sessions "exciting as making our first album 'Polythene'".

On 25 August 2016, the band released the track 'Eskimo', along with a music video accompanying the release. Grant has said that the track "is a song about a journey of self discovery. We are always looking for the right path in life in which to take and are often casualties of our own misguidance and inner demons." In addition, he said that "We really wanted a trippy, almost psychedelic style video to capture the groove and darker spirit of the song; a modern twist on the 60’s psychedelia imagery with the band more in silhouette." It was also announced that Feeder would headline the RFL Grand Final at Old Trafford, playing to an estimated 75,000 people on 8 October 2016.

== Reception ==
=== Critical ===
Professional ratings
Review scores
Source	Rating
Classic Rock	8/10 stars
Drowned In Sound	8/10 stars
Kerrang!	4/5 stars
Q	3/5 stars

The album received generally positive reviews from critics. Classic Rock gave the album 8/10, saying that "Feeder are back in scintillating style" and describing All Bright Electric as "Feeder's most satisfying album to date." Kerrang! rated it 4/5, saying that All Bright Electric is "the sound of a band reconnected" and that the band have "rediscovered their drive, their darkness, and their sense of self-discovery." Drowned In Sound were similarly positive, giving the album 8/10 and dubbing it "an album that doesn't so much announce Feeder's return as bellow it from the rooftops." Impose Magazine were also very positive in their review, describing it as an album of "rock so classic and timeless it might as well be Stonehenge." XS Noize gave it 9/10 and described All Bright Electric as "hands down, their best LP to date." RushOnRock rated the album 9/10, dubbing it "an excellent album", and Mosh also gave it 9/10, concluding that All Bright Electric "is a stellar album in every area, from lyrics to composition, and everything else in between."

Q magazine was less positive, giving it 3/5 and saying that "while there's no overall drop in standards, there's too much filler and they're less assured when they take chances."

=== Commercial ===
The album was a commercial success in the United Kingdom, charting at #10 upon its first week of release, making it the first Feeder album since 2008's Silent Cry to reach the top 10, after their last two narrowly missed out. The following week the album dropped to #145.

The album also charted at #5 in the Official Vinyl Albums Chart Top 40 for the period 14 October 2016 - 20 October 2016.

== Track listing ==
No.	Title	Length
1.	"Universe of Life"	3:42
2.	"Eskimo"	3:48
3.	"Geezer"	3:53
4.	"Paperweight"	3:18
5.	"Infrared Ultraviolet"	5:15
6.	"Oh Mary"	3:10
7.	"The Impossible"	3:57
8.	"Divide the Minority"	3:28
9.	"Angels and Lullabys"	3:08
10.	"Hundred Liars"	4:21
11.	"Another Day on Earth"	3:54
Total length:		41:54

Deluxe edition
No.	Title	Length
12.	"Holy Water"	3:37
13.	"Slint"	3:17
14.	"Eyes to the Sky"	3:29
Total length:		52:17

- Deluxe edition tracks 1–9 are as listed on the above track list, whilst "Hundred Liars" and "Another Day on Earth" are tracks 11 and 12 respectively.

== Personnel ==
Feeder

- Grant Nicholas – lead vocals, guitars, keyboards, percussion, production
- Taka Hirose – bass guitar
- Karl Brazil – drums, percussion

Additional musicians

- Anna Stubbs – backing vocals (track 2)
- Nikolaj Torp Larsen – keyboards (tracks 2, 6, 10 (Note: Deluxe edition tracklist), 11, 12)
- Brian Sperber – keyboards (track 13)
- Hana Sky Nicholas – backing vocals (track 11)
- Tom Manning - drums (track 14)

Technical personnel

- Tim Roe – production, engineering, mixing
- Emil Romer – assistant engineer
- Luke Gibbs – assistant engineer
- Tom Fuller – assistant engineer
- Tom Manning – assistant engineer
- Brian Sperber – mixing (track 10), engineering (track 13)
- Chris Sheldon – mixing (tracks 1 to 5, 7, 8, 11)
- Brian Gardner – mastering
- Ted Jensen – mastering (track 14)
- Sam Miller engineering (track 13)
- Matt Sime – mixing (track 14*), engineering (track 14)
- Darrin Woodford – management
- David Rowell – management
- Matt Page – management
- Nils Leonard – art direction

== Charts ==
Chart (2016)	Peak position
Belgian Albums (Ultratop Wallonia)	193
Irish Albums (IRMA)	66
Japanese Albums (Oricon)	167
Scottish Albums (OCC)	10
UK Albums (OCC)	10
