= Echo Park (album) =

Studio album by Feeder
- Released: 23 April 2001
- Recorded: 2000
- Genres: Alternative rock; post-grunge; post-Britpop
- Length: 45:23
- Label: Echo
- Producers: Gil Norton; Feeder

Feeder chronology
Another Yesterday (2000)	Echo Park (2001)	Comfort in Sound (2002)

Singles from Echo Park
- 1. "Buck Rogers" Released: 8 January 2001; 2. "Seven Days in the Sun" Released: 2 April 2001; 3. "Turn" Released: 2 July 2001; 4. "Piece by Piece" Released: 2001

Echo Park is the third studio album by Welsh rock band Feeder. It was their first album since 1999's Yesterday Went Too Soon. The album was recorded at Great Linford Manor in Milton Keynes during most of 2000 and was produced by Gil Norton.

Following a return to live performances of their own, after performing for most of the year at various festivals and the release of the singles "Buck Rogers" and "Seven Days in the Sun" the album was released on 23 April 2001. Two further singles—"Turn" and "Just a Day"—followed the album's release, in which the latter was not on the album, but as a B-side on "Seven Days in the Sun". The album initially received mixed reviews from the music press but was received well by the public and in retrospect by critics, reaching number five on the UK Albums Chart. It is the last album to feature drummer Jon Lee before his death the following year.

== Background ==
Following the minor commercial success of their highly regarded 1999 album, Yesterday Went Too Soon, the band appeared at the Manic Millennium concert at the Millennium Stadium in Cardiff, South Wales, supporting fellow Welsh band the Manic Street Preachers, before a headline show at the London Astoria the following year. During this time Grant Nicholas, the group's frontman and principal songwriter, began to write new material for a future album, with songs such as "Buck Rogers" and "Seven Days in the Sun" emerging through the course of the year. Versions of the newly composed songs were performed many times during the course of 2000 at various festivals such as V2000 (in which "Oxygen" was performed, and broadcast on MTV UK), the Glastonbury Festival and T in the Park, before the band then embarked on a mini-tour playing small venues in December.

Lyrically a lot of the album is inspired by Grant Nicholas ending a long-term relationship around the time of writing the record. Mainly in songs such as "Buck Rogers", "Piece by Piece", "We Can't Rewind", "Turn", "Tell All Your Friends" and "Satellite News".

During the summer of the same year, Feeder began to finalise the song demos while on breaks from touring. The band recorded at the Milton Keynes recording studio, Great Lindford Manor, which comprises a family living upstairs and the studio downstairs.

Producer Gil Norton worked alongside the band. In an interview, Grant said that there were periods of time in which there was friction between him (Gil) and the band, but said that despite the occasional arguments, they still remained good friends, and continued to work together on the next two studio albums.

== Music ==
"Buck Rogers"
"Buck Rogers" was the band's first UK top 10 single, and is currently the joint highest peaking single from the band, tied at #5 with "Tumble and Fall", released in 2005.

Echo Park features a varied mix of musical styles. While most of the tracks are fast, with "We Can't Rewind" showing aggression, and demonstrate the change in direction to a more commercial approach, other songs such as "Piece by Piece", "Satellite News", "Turn" and "Oxygen" reveal a quieter, slower and more melodic temperament. With Echo Park, the band began to incorporate additional instruments into their sound. Many tracks feature the use of Moog synthesizers, which Grant experimented with during the recording of the album. The opening track, "Standing on the Edge", is seen by Grant as the most experimental track on the album, as it is mostly synthesized. The closing track "Bug", was recorded live in the studio and uses more dirty-sounding riffs than most of the tracks on the record.

The voice heard at the beginning of the track "Standing on the Edge" is that of Matt Sime who is a friend of the band. He played keyboards on tour from 2000 to 2001, and also at their festival appearances of 2002. He continued to work with the band in the studio, engineering their recordings, until retiring permanently from the music business in 2011.

The lyrical themes explored on Echo Park range from those of relationships on "Buck Rogers", to the idea of turning the clock back and wanting to change the past on "Turn". The two songs both feature dark moods in the lyrics, with "Oxygen" and "Satellite News" also employing a similar approach.

== Release ==
Professional ratings
Review scores
Source	Rating
AllMusic	3/5 stars
Drowned in Sound	8/10
Kerrang!	4/5 stars
Q	3/5 stars

Echo Park was released in the United Kingdom on 23 April 2001. Before the album's release, the single "Seven Days in the Sun" reached #14 in the UK Singles Chart, which was the follow-up to "Buck Rogers" which reached #5. The album entered the UK Albums Chart at the same position, before becoming their first Gold album; they had been in danger of splitting up if the album didn't sell well. Grant said at the time in a Melody Maker interview, "It's the same with any band. That's just the way the music business is. There is only a certain amount of money a label will put into a band. I'm just being realistic. We've been around for seven or eight years and I am not planning on giving up, but we're putting everything into this record and I'm just hoping that people like it".

In July 2001 Echo released "Turn" as the third UK single to be taken directly from the album. The single reached #27 on the UK Singles Chart. It was the last UK single from the album, but "Just a Day", a B-side from "Seven Days in the Sun", was released in December of that year, and made #12 in the UK Singles Chart. "Piece by Piece" was released in Europe only shortly after "Turn". In August 2003, the album was later certified Platinum after the commercial success of Comfort in Sound.

=== Accolades ===
In 2015, Drowned in Sound included the album in its list "In Depth: Lost Albums 2000–2015". a list of 16 albums the website considers to be great but overlooked.

The album was also featured as one of 38 albums on the Official Charts website as one of their “Albums turning 20 years old in 2021”.

The week the album was released “Free All Angels”, by Northern Ireland band Ash, entered the top spot of the album charts and initially had a substantial career sales lead over “Echo Park”. In late 2020 however, “Echo Park” sold more than any other album to be released that week overall, on 332,000 sales. “Free All Angels” stood on 299,000 at the time, aided hugely by streaming equivalent sales for "Buck Rogers" being much more significant than that of "Shining Light" the most streamed track from Ash's album.

== Track listing ==
All tracks are written by Grant Nicholas.

No.	Title	Length
1.	"Standing on the Edge"	3:13
2.	"Buck Rogers"	3:13
3.	"Piece by Piece"	3:49
4.	"Seven Days in the Sun"	3:39
5.	"We Can't Rewind"	3:52
6.	"Turn"	4:30
7.	"Choke"	3:20
8.	"Oxygen"	4:20
9.	"Tell All Your Friends"	2:55
10.	"Under the Weather"	3:33
11.	"Satellite News" (omitted from most non UK pressings)	5:25
12.	"Bug"	3:44

Japanese release bonus tracks
No.	Title	Length
12.	"Just a Day"	4:04
13.	"Purple"	4:05
14.	"Heads"	3:05
15.	"21st Century Meltdown"	3:05

Australian release bonus tracks
No.	Title	Length
12.	"High"	4:33
13.	"Descend"	5:20

== Personnel ==
Feeder

- Grant Nicholas – guitar, keyboards, vocals, additional production on "Piece by Piece"
- Taka Hirose – bass
- Jon Henry Lee – drums, percussion

Additional personnel

- Gil Norton – producer
- Feeder – producer on "Standing on the Edge and "Choke"
- Matt Sime – engineering additional engineering, additional production on "Standing on the Edge" "Piece by Piece" and "Choke" mixing on "Bug"
- Dante Supple – engineering on "Buck Rogers"
- Mark Pythian – programming
- Jack Joseph Puig – mixing
- Richard Thomas Ash – second mix engineer
- Joe Zook – second engineer, Pro Tools operator
- Bob Ludwig – mastering
- Blue Source – art direction
- Roy Wilkinson – illustration

== Charts ==
=== Weekly charts ===
Chart (2001)	Peak position
Irish Albums (IRMA)	54
Scottish Albums (Official Charts)	4
UK Albums (Official Charts)	5

=== Year-end charts ===
Chart (2001)	Position
UK Albums (OCC)	126

== Accolade ==
Publication	Country	Accolade	Year	Rank
Kerrang!	United Kingdom	Top 100 British Rock Albums of All Time	2005	#25
