= Find the Colour =

2003 single by Feeder

Single by Feeder

from the album Comfort in Sound
- Released: 22 September 2003
- Length: 3:56
- Label: Echo
- Songwriter: Grant Nicholas
- Producer: Gil Norton

Feeder singles chronology
"Forget About Tomorrow" (2003)	"Find the Colour" (2003)	"Comfort in Sound" (2003)

"Find the Colour" is a song by Welsh rock band Feeder, released as the fourth single from their fourth studio album, Comfort in Sound, on 22 September 2003. The single peaked at number 24 on the UK Singles Chart.

== Music video ==
The music video sees the band performing in a dark room, with the camera panning around them while they are performing. The action is seen in slow motion, and are actually performing "Godzilla" from their Comfort in Sound album, with the video slown down with "Find the Colour" edited into the video so it looks like they are performing a different song. This could be seen as the band not being too keen on having the song as a single release.

It was noted by frontman Grant Nicholas in an interview on now-defunct TV channel The Amp that as the video is seen in slow motion from start to end, it has done something not done by many or any music videos in the past.

== Reception ==
Before the release of the single, the video was getting many plays on MTV2 in the United Kingdom. It reached number two on the channel's daily voting chart, and number six in the weekly listings.

When the single was released, it eventually stalled at number 24 on the UK Singles Chart, mainly due to being the fourth and final single from an album that had already reached platinum status, while also making the track available for 11 months at the time. It also had only one CD format, unlike the previous three having two, thus halving sales amongst fanbase members collecting b-sides, as each CD format had two different songs.

== Track listings ==
CD

1. "Find the Colour" (single edit) – 3:43
2. "Remember the Silence" – 3:51
3. "Circles" – 3:00

7-inch vinyl (white)

1. "Find the Colour" (single edit) – 3:43
2. "Remember the Silence" – 3:51

== Charts ==
Chart (2003)	Peak position
Scottish Singles Sales (Official Charts)	23
UK Singles (Official Charts)	24
UK Indie (Official Charts)	4
