= Raindancer =

- Origin: Newport, Wales
- Genres: Electro; acoustic; rock
- Years active: 1990 (early 90s)
- Spinoffs: Feeder
- Past members: Grant Nicholas; Jon Lee; Simon Blight; John Canham

Raindancer was an electroacoustic rock band formed in Newport, Wales in the early 1990s. The band featured Grant Nicholas and Jon Lee, who later became founding members of Feeder.

== History ==
On 20 June 1991, Raindancer were invited by ITV to perform on a late night show, showcasing up and coming bands, called Stage One.

== Members ==
- Grant Nicholas – guitar, vocals
- Jon Lee – drums
- Simon Blight – guitar
- John Canham – bass
