= Feeder (band) =

Welsh alternative rock band

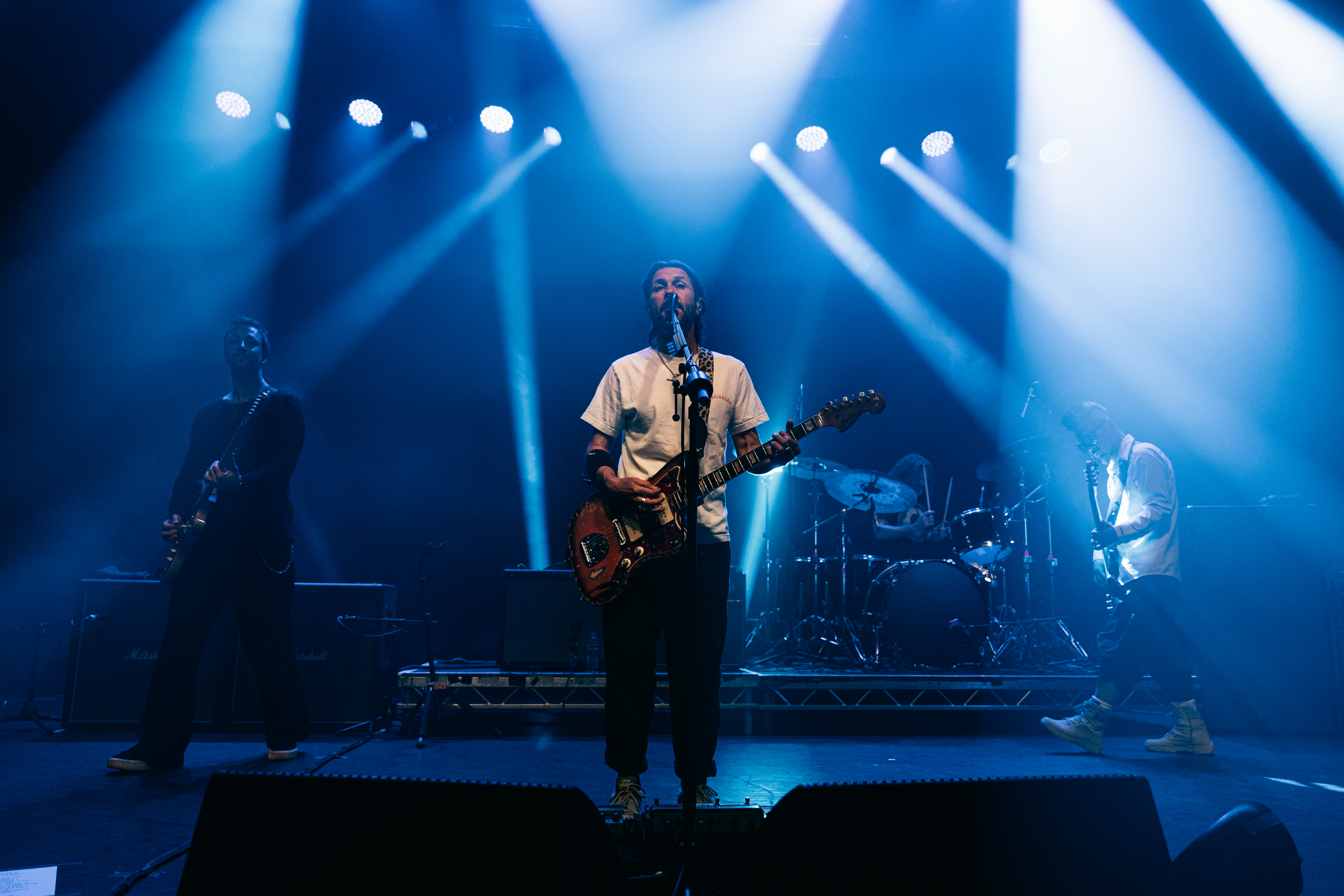
- Feeder performing in 2025

Background information
- Also known as: Reel, Renegades
- Origin: Newport, Gwent, Wales
- Genres: Britpop; alternative rock; indie rock; post-Britpop; post-grunge
- Years active: 1994–present
- Labels: Cooking Vinyl; Big Teeth; The Echo Label; Sony; Pony Canyon; Victor; Elektra; Universal; Festival; Liberation; PIAS; David Gresham; BMG; Believe
- Spinoff of: Reel
- Members: Grant Nicholas; Taka Hirose
- Past members: Mark Richardson; Jon Lee
- Website: feederweb.com

Feeder are a Welsh rock band formed in 1994. The band have released 12 albums selling over a million copies domestically, despite never having signed to a major recording label in the UK. In August 2019, they were inducted into The Kerrang! Hall of Fame.

Although the band formed in 1994, they performed under an earlier incarnation of "Reel", which was formed in 1992 by vocalist and guitarist Grant Nicholas, drummer Jon Lee and bassist Simon Blight, three of the four members of Raindancer, after the departure of that band's other member, guitarist John Canham. However, Blight left Reel later in 1992, and the band played with many session bassists before hiring Taka Hirose in 1994 and re-establishing themselves as Feeder; that year, the band signed with The Echo Label.

Feeder garnered media attention in 2001 for their third album, Echo Park, and its lead single, "Buck Rogers", which later became a UK top five Platinum-selling single. Jon Lee died by suicide at his Miami home in January 2002, after which the remaining members began to record and play with former Skunk Anansie drummer Mark Richardson. They released their fourth album, Comfort in Sound, later that year. Richardson was ultimately made an official member, remaining so until May 2009 when he returned to a reformed Skunk Anansie. Feeder have since worked with a roster of drummers live and in the studio, including Tim Trotter, Damon Wilson, Karl Brazil and former Elviss drummer Geoff Holroyde. Between 2010 and 2024, the band charted seven more top 20 albums, with the latest of these being 2024's Black / Red, their fifth consecutive top 10 album. In 2019, the band signed a deal with Believe UK to release their tenth studio album, Tallulah. The band released their eleventh studio album, titled Torpedo, in 2022. Their twelfth studio album, a double album titled Black/Red, was released in 2024.

== History ==
=== Early years (1994–1996) ===
In 1994, Reel/Real's bass player, Julian Smith, left the group. Grant Nicholas and Jon Lee went 'back to the drawing board'. They placed an advert in Loot for a new bass player. The advert was answered by Taka Hirose, a Japanese ex-pat working in London as a graphic designer. The trio changed their name to Feeder, after Nicholas's pet goldfish. In 1994, Feeder sent a demo tape to The Echo Label. Representatives at Echo listened to the tape, sent an employee to see the band play live, then offered them a record contract.

In 1995, Feeder recorded their first EP, Two Colours. Limited to 1,500 CDs and 1,000 7" vinyl singles, the band sold Two Colours at gigs. 1996 was an eventful year for Feeder. In February, Kerrang! and Edge gave away a promo tape the band made with producer Chris Sheldon. Called 'Two Tracker', it featured two songs that would feature on Feeder's debut album. In July, Feeder released their first commercially available release, Swim. In August, the band made their first appearance at the Reading festival and in October, they released their first single, "Stereo World".

=== Polythene and Yesterday Went Too Soon (1997–1999) ===
Feeder's debut album, Polythene, was released in May 1997. Polythene was acclaimed by critics, including Metal Hammer and Kerrang!, who placed the album at first and sixth in their respective end-of-year lists. Some critics labelled the band "The UK's answer to the Smashing Pumpkins", and also drew comparisons to The Pixies and Talk Talk.

Feeder would go on to release three further singles from Polythene, "Tangerine" (charting at No. 60 in the UK singles chart.) and "Cement" (No. 53), "Crash" (No. 48). In October 1997, Feeder released their breakthrough single "High", which charted at No. 24. They also reissued Polythene, adding "High" to the track listing, along with some other changes.

In early 1998 Feeder toured the United States as a support act for Everclear. During their tour, the band released a re-worked version of "Suffocate" for UK release, which charted at No. 37. After their return to the UK, they played their own headline tour with Everclear in support. They stayed in the US for most of the year, playing various music festivals alongside a headline tour with "High", which had been released to radio stations and charted at No. 24 on the Billboard Modern Rock Tracks chart. The band travelled back to the UK to play at V98.

In March 1999, Feeder returned with a new single, "Day In Day Out", which charted at No. 31. Two more singles followed, "Insomnia" in May (charting at No. 22 and resulting in their first appearance on Top of the Pops) and "Yesterday Went Too Soon" in August (charting at No. 20). That summer, Feeder added guitarist Dean Tidey to their live band. They performed on the main stage of the Reading and Leeds festivals.

The album Yesterday Went Too Soon was released on 30 August. Yesterday Went Too Soon entered the UK albums chart at No. 8, an unexpected position for the band.

The UK music press warmed to the album. It was Melody Maker's Album of the Week (and later No. 24 album of 1999), while Metal Hammer placed the album in at No. 6 and Kerrang! ranked it at No. 16. As of March 2003, the album has been certified gold shipping 100,000 units in the UK, with total counter sales standing at 110,000 as of February 2005.

In November, Feeder released a final single from the album, a re-recorded version of "Paperfaces", which charted at No. 41. The year ended with the band supporting the Red Hot Chili Peppers at Wembley Arena and Manic Street Preachers at the Millennium Stadium.

=== Echo Park and mainstream breakthrough (2000–2001) ===
Feeder spent most of 2000 writing and recording for their next album. They previewed new material at festivals around the country, including V2000 and Glastonbury. They would end the year promoting "Buck Rogers", their first single since November 1999 and then playing a mini-tour at the end of the year to mainly showcase the new material. The release of the single on 8 January 2001 was coupled with a signing session at London's now defunct Tower Records store and then a TV appearance on Top of The Pops before the single charted. The single charted at number five, becoming the band's first top 10 entry in the singles chart before appearing on Top of the Pops again. "Buck Rogers" then spent a second week in the top 10.

Grant wrote "Buck Rogers" with The Pixies as an influence, but "on a comic book level". He had originally written the track for another band with whom Echo Park producer Gil Norton was working, but decided not to give it away, for he felt Feeder themselves could have a hit with it. "Buck Rogers" still receives regular airplay on alternative radio stations in the United Kingdom. Kerrang!'s writers also approved of the track as one of their "666 Songs You Must Own", when it appeared at No. 5 in their rock songs list in November 2004.

After a sell-out tour of two legs ending at the London Astoria, the album Echo Park entered at number five in the UK album charts, shortly after "Seven Days in the Sun", the album's second single charted at No. 14. Shortly before the single's release, the band's rise up to the mainstream was recognised by the now defunct Scottish Television live music show Boxed Set, where a half-hour-long live-set with a studio audience was played. A third single, "Turn" reached No. 27 in July before festival season. "Just a Day", a b-side from "Seven Days in the Sun", later reached No. 12 in December. The response the album received on a critical level was mixed, with Dan Genroe of Q magazine claiming that the listener will still be "feeling hungry half an hour later", alongside suggesting that the album is "hard to love". Ben Myers of Kerrang! gave the album 4/5 (KKKK) which indicates "blinding", while citing that the band "hit their stride" on the album, alongside suggesting that the album is "fat free and stripped to the bone".

The album saw the band adopt a more 'commercial' sound, also incorporating synthesizers. Lyrically, Echo Park contains both a comedic approach, as with "Seven Days in the Sun", and dark emotions, such as those shown on "Turn", "Oxygen", and "Satellite News". It was during the campaign for Echo Park that the band played another slot on the main stage at the Reading and Leeds festival, including T in the Park. As of August 2003, the album has shipped 300,000 units in the UK going platinum, with counter sales standing at 293,000 as of February 2005. Grant said in a Melody Maker interview that if the album did not sell well enough the band would probably split up; he said at the time that "It's the same with any band. That's just the way the music business is. There is only a certain amount of money a label will put into a band. I'm just being realistic. We've been around for seven or eight years and I am not planning on giving up, but we're putting everything into this record and I'm just hoping that people like it". The album campaign helped the band in August 2001 win the "Best British Live Act" accolade at the Kerrang! awards, before ending the year supporting the Stereophonics, and then releasing the "Just a Day" single in December. In July 2024, "Buck Rogers" gained a platinum certification for 600,000 physical sales, digital downloads and streaming points combined. One year prior to this, "Just a Day" also passed 400,000 sales to be certified gold.

In July 2001, Feeder's EP Swim was re-released with extra tracks, being a selection of b-sides from their earlier singles, alongside the videos for the Polythene singles "Crash" and "Cement". Overall unit sales for Swim stand at 40,000 as of February 2005.

=== Jon Lee's death and Comfort in Sound (2002–2003) ===
In January 2002, Jon Lee died at home in Miami. The band kept out of the public eye for most of the year. It was during this time that lead-singer Grant Nicholas wrote a series of songs relating to their emotions and reactions to Lee's death, which formed their fourth album Comfort in Sound. The band brought in former Skunk Anansie and Little Angels drummer Mark Richardson, whom Grant first met in 1994, when Feeder went on tour with Richardson's then-band, B.l.o.w.

The album focused mainly on themes such as loss, depression, grief and positivity, while dedicating "Quick Fade" to Jon. The album was released in October of the same year to widespread critical acclaim in the British music press, with Kerrang! alongside the heavy rock magazine Metal Hammer giving the album their respective Album of the Week accolades. The band were invited to the Reading and Leeds festivals that year, headlining the second stage at Reading on the first day which took place on 23 August, before heading off to Leeds the next. Grant also mentioned that at the time their fourth album already had a series of backing tracks recorded, with a total of 15 when recording is completed with then 10 chosen for the final album, when the final track listing was revealed, this was increased to 12. The album is currently Feeder's best-seller with an estimated 503,706 units sold as of April 2012. The album charted at No. 98 in Japan and No. 28 in Ireland, beating the peak position of No. 57 that Echo Park managed during the previous year. In Japan, it would be the first time Feeder ever charted there. The album charted at number six in the UK.

Musically, Comfort in Sound is mellower than Feeder's previous albums, with the use of a string orchestra on "Forget About Tomorrow", while other tracks on the album also used an accordion, trumpet, and a piano played by their manager Matt Page, with "Godzilla" being one of two tracks on the album to use loud guitars. The album was their first release to be certified platinum, (with Echo Park going platinum later on). It also spawned their second top 10 single, with "Just the Way I'm Feeling" in January 2003. In December of the same year they took on their only arena tour, after the album's first nationwide tour was a sell out with 50,000 tickets sold, and visited 21 different towns and cities in the United Kingdom over 23 different dates. In reaction to this, the band were invited to the Glastonbury Festival being placed third on the last day, playing the "Pyramid Stage". Shortly after the release of the single, the band were invited to support Coldplay on their UK and European tour, due to their frontman Chris Martin often saying how much he liked the Comfort in Sound album and their live shows. Their show at the Birmingham National Indoor Arena was reviewed by Kerrang!, which seen Steve Beebee give the band 4/5 (KKKK) for their performance.

The album's final single, the title track, was only available to buy as a limited edition of 3,000 CDs on their 2003 arena tour. Four singles were released commercially, with those being "Come Back Around" (No. 14), "Just the Way I'm Feeling" (No. 10), "Forget About Tomorrow" (No. 12), and "Find the Colour" (No. 24), which was released following their V2003 appearance and Kerrang! award win for "Best British Band", beating competition from Muse and the Stereophonics, which Grant dedicated to Jon saying it was the award he had always wanted the band to win. The band later went on to win an Internet Music Award for their "Just The Way I'm Feeling" video, while the album became their first to appear on the end of year top 75 album charts, appearing at No. 66. The album's commercial reception helped Echo experience their most successful financial year. Feeder then received their only nomination to date at The BRIT Awards, in which they appeared in the "Best British Rock" category at the 2004 event, before making their only appearance in the charts that year as part of Bob Geldof's Band Aid 20 charity ensemble. The single was the Christmas number one, and became the year's biggest-selling UK single. Alongside only making one singles chart appearance in 2004, Feeder also only made one live appearance during the year as part of the Carling Live 24 event, playing their show at the Hammersmith Apollo on 1 May, which was advertised as a celebratory show of their achievements over the previous year.

=== Pushing the Senses (2004–2005) ===
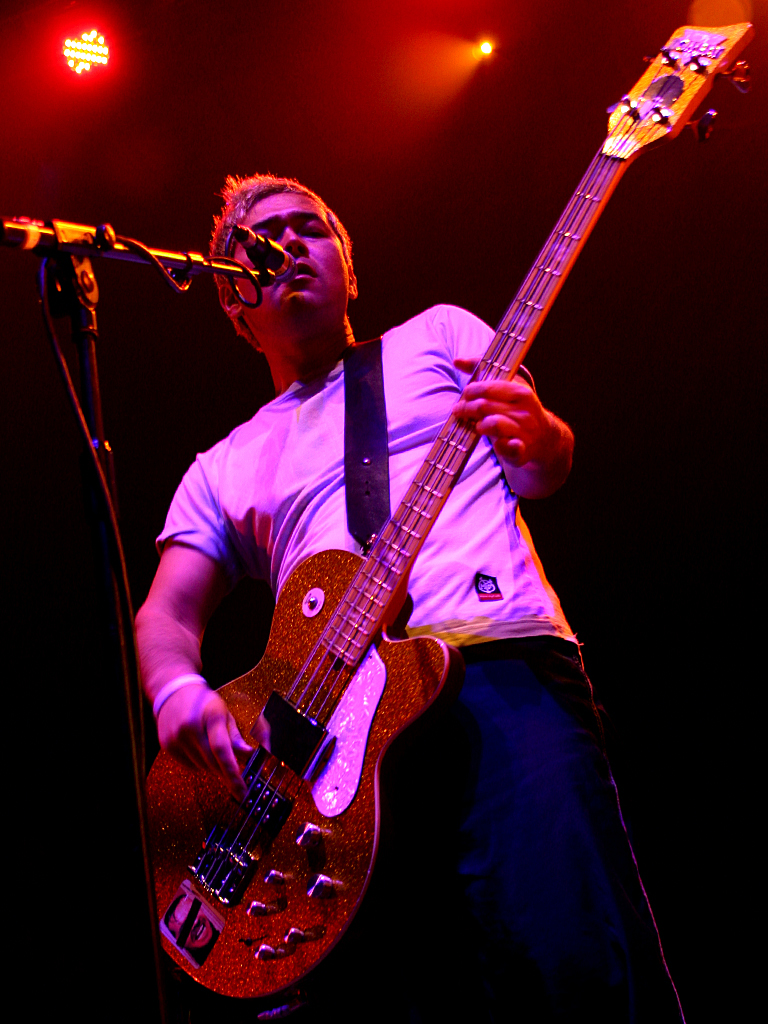
Taka Hirose performing with the band at Cardiff International Arena in 2005

Feeder returned to the studio to record their fifth album Pushing the Senses. The album was described by Nicholas as more of an extension to Comfort in Sound, as it focused on the same lyrical themes and musical styles, while also stating it had more of an organic sound. It contains a number of piano-driven tracks, with "Frequency" being an example, which was produced by Coldplay producer Ken Nelson, while for the rest of the album Gil Norton was on production duties. Nicholas told Kerrang! in May 2004, "I've done some recording on my own in a little studio up by where I live in North London. I demo the album in its full form before the rest of the band play on it. Its difficult to know at this stage what it will turn out like, but so far its slightly more mature sounding". He also stated "Each album is a journey and a reflection of the past, there is some stuff that touches on what has happened, but there are songs about love, songs of loss and songs about the future. I don't want to give too much away but there's one track called "Bitter Glass". Its quite dark but uplifting too. Its about pulling yourself out of a big hole".

The album was Feeder's highest-charting release, at number two on the UK album chart selling 42,951 units in its first week, while receiving a gold certification and becoming a top 100 album in six other countries. Press response to the album was mixed, while Kerrang! were brutal towards the band for all of their review, with Ben Meyers referring to them as a "Radio Friendly Unit Shifter", including comparisons to a "Pastel box". Nicholas later said in a documentary with Kerrang! Radio that he was "pissed off" with the review their magazine counterpart gave them, while citing "It was a very unfair review and reviewed by the wrong person". Nicholas later added that he was only annoyed with the review, because it came from a publication who were always in the past supportive of the band.

The album helped them secure a headline slot at 2005's Download Festival. Shortly afterwards, Feeder supported U2 for a brief period on their Vertigo Tour, then played at the Live 8 concert in Edinburgh (the second charity event the band played that year after Tsunami Relief Cardiff).

The campaign in total spawned four UK top 40 singles, which included "Shatter", a reworked version of the "Tumble and Fall" b-side that became a double A-side with "Tender" (No. 11), released following a fan-petition to see "Shatter" released as a single in its own right. Other singles included "Tumble and Fall" (No. 5), "Feeling A Moment" (No. 13), and "Pushing the Senses" (No. 30). The album was after ten weeks on sales of 111,214 units, 22 percent ahead of Comfort in Sound at that stage. However, the album did not keep up this momentum while also not going platinum. The last reported sales were that of 160,183 in October of the same year, which fell below Echo's expectations. It is however the band's most successful record based on peak chart positions in each country of release, while also being their only album so far to spawn a charting single outside of the UK and Ireland when "Feeling a Moment" peaked at No. 32 in Australia. Feeder already at the time charted four top 50 singles in Ireland, with "Tumble and Fall" being their first and only top 40 to date reaching a peak position of No. 26. The album itself made the Irish top 20 artist album chart at No. 16, one week before its UK release.

Feeder would end the year seeing their then latest album appear at No. 39 on Q's end-of-year list, with "Feeling a Moment" voted the 98th best song of the year by its readers. However, on 3 December 2005, they were forced to postpone a winter tour, after Grant picked up bleeds on his vocal cords the night before during a gig in Brighton, causing the show to be abandoned and later rescheduled along with the rest of the outstanding dates. Later on that same night of the postponement of the tour being made official, the band won the Welsh Music Award for Best Album with Hirose collecting the award as Nicholas was recovering from his illness and was due to join Hirose. During the year, Feeder's domestic studio album sales passed the one million units mark.

=== The Singles and Silent Cry (2006–2008) ===
In late 2005, Feeder already returned to the studio, with Stephen Street working as the band's producer to record three new tracks to appear on their then forthcoming singles collection. "Lost and Found" (which Grant described as "an urban love song") became the first single to promote the collection, and reached No. 12 in the UK singles chart in May 2006, after completing their delayed winter tour, which ended at the LG Arena in Birmingham in front of 8,000 fans. The Singles, released in the same month as "Lost and Found", was the first Feeder album to have involvement from a major label, with EMI taking part in a one-off collaboration with Echo as the album's distributor. The album opened with first week sales of 50,003 entering at number one on a later revised version of the UK Compilation Albums Chart, and was certified platinum in under three months, while "Save Us" was its second and final single in the UK, charting at No. 34 in late July. Sales of The Singles, alongside a series of changes at Echo making them into an "Incubator label", enabled the company to report a "modest profit" for 2006. Feeder returned to the Reading and Leeds festivals after a four-year break, having a late slot on the main stage, before ending the year with a small tour of London, playing The Roundhouse, and The Coronet. These were in aid of War Child who the band are patrons of, having earlier in the year visited The Congo as part of their work for the charity. Although their appearances at The Roundhouse would be their first two, their appearance at The Coronet would be their first and last as it was later demolished in 2021.

In 2006 Feeder announced in an interview with XFM that their next album would be reminiscent of their earlier material. They spent most of 2007 recording, with the resulting album Silent Cry being released on 16 June 2008. On balance, the album received moderate reviews. While some like The Guardian were negative towards the album, others like Rock Louder were more positive. On its release week the album charted at number eight with sales of 16,029. In its second week the album then fell to number 30, with a third week drop to number 60 before leaving the top 75 albums listing. In Japan it peaked at No. 53, which is currently higher than any of their studio albums, but lower than the peak of The Singles. Before the release of the album, "We Are the People" charted at No. 25 in the singles chart, making it their lowest chart position for a lead single since 1999's "Day in Day Out". "Miss You" from the album was given away by the band's official website as a free download in April, and gained over 8,000 downloads on its first day of release. As of December 2008, sales of Silent Cry stand at less than 50,000 units, less than was what hoped for by their label. Shortly after the album was released, the band recorded a cover of Public Image Ltd's 1978 self-titled single "Public Image", for a compilation album to celebrate Independents Day which celebrated independently released music. The second single from Silent Cry was Feeder's first download-only single, consisting of "Tracing Lines" and the album's title track which failed to make the charts.

In May 2008, the band played an eight-date tour to promote Silent Cry. Tickets sold out in six hours. These dates was followed by a one-off gig on 12 June at the Proud Galleries in Camden, which sold out in six minutes. The band then went on to play at the iTunes festival in July, which saw a live six-track EP release of their performance, before playing the 2008 Reading and Leeds festivals in August, on the main stage. In July the band played at T in the Park, with an appearance at the Isle of Wight Festival the month previous. In 2008, the band also introduced live keyboard player Dean Deavall, of the band Casino. During the same year, on 25 October at 06:00 GMT after playing the Glasgow Barrowlands as part of their 29-date UK tour, the band's crew bus caught fire on the M62 motorway whilst travelling between Glasgow and Lincoln, destroying it and the crew's personal items. It was also announced by Chrysalis later on in the year, that Echo have been restructured into a copyright exploitation company, in which its main duty is maintaining the copyright on existing releases while no longer releasing any new records or signing any more artists. As a result, Feeder were until 2010 no longer on a record contract in their own country, while still being signed to their Japanese label Victor and Play it Again Sam (PIAS), their European label. Their 2008 UK tour, seen their first ever gig in Loughbrough, and their last show at the London Astoria on 18 November 2008. The venue was later torn down in early 2009 and was also their last show as an Echo Label artist.

After ending their tour at the Portsmouth Pyramids Centre, a six track EP titled Seven Sleepers was released in Japan, the same time they toured there in March. It included a collection of B-sides from the Silent Cry album, plus two new songs.

=== Mark Richardson's and Dean Tidey's departures and Renegades (2009–2010) ===
After starting 2009 with two warm-up shows for their tour of Japan in Scarborough and Crewe (which was a rescheduled gig from the previous tour and had appeared on early promotional posters), the band later on in May announced that Feeder had "ended their partnership" with drummer Mark Richardson, who returned to his original band Skunk Anansie. Mark was replaced by session drummer Karl Brazil who had just come off tour with James Blunt, and had also played drums for British band Ben's Brother. Karl's first live appearances with the band, after a series of university events were at the UK leg of the Sonisphere Festival, stating that this would be their only UK festival appearance of 2009, as they would be working on their seventh studio album. It was then later announced that they would be appearing at the Hevy Music Festival in Folkestone. Here they previewed a new track titled "Sentimental", with the announcement that they had been in a recording studio in South Wales. The following day the band then played the Sonisphere Festival in Knebworth, which would ultimately be touring guitarist Dean Tidey's final show with the band.

At first, Tim Trotter then of Mexicolas was filling in on drum duties in the studio also as a session drummer, before Karl stepped in. With Karl playing drums for Robbie Williams, Natalie Imbruglia and Ben's Brother, Tim once again took over drum duties in the studio. On 2 December, the band's official webpage was changed to display the word "RENEGADES" and the names of each of the band members by their surname, with "BRAZIL" mentioned amongst these. On 17 December a sample of a new song "Sentimental" was added to their website, which was later replaced with a 20-second clip of another song called "Renegades". Later on that month the website announced a six date tour and the release of a tour-only EP which was released on "Big Teeth Music", also their own record label. After the tour was completed, another six date tour was shortly announced with the band this time playing bigger venues. Another EP was released to coincide with the tour, which included a further four new songs with one of these being titled "Home"; one of the new songs the band performed on their first tour under this alias. The side-project was used as a method to promote the seventh Feeder studio album titled Renegades at live shows where they would mainly play the new songs, thus avoiding having to play any of their hits if they played as Feeder. The side-project would cease in 2010 after playing their final gig as Renegades at that year's Sonisphere Festival.

In an April 2010 interview with South Yorkshire newspaper The Star, Grant expressed his disappointment with the side-project band's sudden increase in success and awareness, in which he claimed that he wanted the band to continue playing in clubs with a slower ascendency to the bigger venues. The tour promoter however suggested that Renegades should play slightly bigger venues for the second tour than of those seen on their debut. Looking back on this version of the band, Grant Nicholas explained in an interview with Culture Deluxe, that the project was not a big marketing plan, but announced it without saying exactly what was happening. Some people thought it was a name change, Grant recording a solo album, while others got the idea from the start. He described problems with promoters printing "Feeder" on the tickets, leading to a misunderstanding that a more mainstream set was expected.

After completing their second and final tour as Renegades, the band then announced their new single "Call Out" under the name of Feeder before shortly revealing the name of their seventh album as Renegades. All of the new songs performed live as Renegades were listed on the album; the free download track "Fallen" was a B-side on "Call Out" and was released as a download and vinyl single, the album being released on 5 July. Renegades peaked at No. 16 on the UK album chart, giving them their seventh top 20 album with sales of 8,729, before being followed-up by the single release of the title track, also only on vinyl and download. In Japan, the album charted at No. 93, making it their least successful since Comfort in Sound. Dean Deavall then departed from Casino to concentrate more on his time with Feeder, including his own band The High Hurts, while live band guitarist Dean Tidey in 2009 departed the band with the reasons disclosed. His final show with the band would later turn out to be at the Sonisphere Festival on 5 August 2009. The album received mostly favourable reviews, although some critics as Will Dean of BBC Online did not praise the album giving it a mixed response

After a tour of Japan which saw Luna Sea guitarist Inoran join them on stage at the Daikanyama Unit for a performance of "Breed" (originally recorded by Nirvana), Feeder returned to the UK for a sell-out tour in late October which started at the Leeds Metropolitan University, before ending at Southampton University. This was followed by a small tour of Europe, South Africa and Australia, before a brief return to the UK ended their year. "Down to the River / This Town" also became the final single from the album, released only as a download and vinyl on 6 December.

=== Side By Side and Generation Freakshow (2011–2012) ===
In 2010, a number of tracks were left off the Renegades album before then being considered for inclusion for the follow-up.

In March 2011, Feeder released "Side by Side", a download-only single in aid of the victims of the 2011 Tōhoku earthquake and tsunami. "Side by Side" charted at No. 91, Across 2011, Feeder played a number of shows with Damon Wilson on drums. On 30 January, "Borders" was released on CD, on 7" vinyl and on cassette – the first time Feeder released a cassette single since 2001's "Just a Day". "Borders" charted at No. 52, giving the band their 25th top 75 single and their first official chart visit since 2008's "We Are the People".

Generation Freakshow was released on 23 April 2012. The critical response was mixed. BBC Music praised the album, while Drowned in Sound, despite negative reviews in the past, credited Feeder for creating another strong addition to their back catalogue. The album, which was released to coincide with a week-long tour, improved upon the response of Renegades by charting at No. 13, which increased the band's UK album charts span to fifteen years, while selling 7,338 units in the same week. In Japan, Generation Freakshow improved upon the chart position of Renegades, when it entered at No. 57 and became their most successful studio album in almost four years. Retrospectively, this album alongside Renegades, has been seen as a commercial failure.

The week after the album's release, "Children of the Sun" was released as the album's second single. It did not chart. The album's title track was due to be a single, but was later pulled despite promotional CDs already being pressed and sent to radio. "Idaho" became the third and final single from the album, released on 27 August. Like "Children of the Sun", it also failed to chart.

The band later announced a tour to complete their year, which would end at the Brixton Academy. It was at this Brixton show on 23 November 2012, Nicholas repeated on stage a statement he made months prior to the tour, being that the band were going to go away for a while and work on outside projects, which caused many to speculate that the band were going to split up later down the line. The commercial failure of the album was a contributing factor to the decision to take a break, before releasing their comeback album in 2016.

Despite the break, Feeder would between 2013 and 2015 play one gig, which was in 2013 at Reading University, but was a private event and thus not recorded as an official show. Soon later before Nicholas worked on his solo album, Hirose worked with Dusty Mellow Gold which was a collaboration project in Japan, while the then touring part of the band saw keyboard player Dean Deavall work with Bill Bailey in his live band, while drummer Damon Wilson concentrated full time with The Temperance Movement, before in 2016 quitting the music industry to spend more time with his family. The week before Nicholas played his first solo show, he announced that "Feeder's heart still beats strong".

The Brixton show would also mark the last ever appearance of drummer Damon Wilson with Feeder, parting ways with the band in 2013.

=== All Bright Electric and Tallulah (2016–2021) ===
On 15 June the band released "Universe of Life", the lead single for All Bright Electric, which was released on 7 October 2016. This was followed on 26 August by the single "Eskimo", along with its music video. Both singles were released free for people who pre-ordered the album. After the band completed their UK tour between September and October 2016, All Bright Electric saw Feeder return to the top 10 of the album chart after an eight-year absence.

In July 2017, the band announced the compilation The Best of Feeder, featuring all the previous singles from the band's career, as well a mini-album of new material within called Arrow. Its lead single, "Figure You Out", was released on 20 July 2017. The compilation later charted at No. 10 on the albums chart, giving Feeder their second album to chart in the upper tier in less than a calendar year.

On 9 August 2019, Feeder released their tenth studio album, Tallulah, before releasing a non-album single, "Criminal" on 1 November of that same year. Although this single failed to chart, the album became the band's most successful studio album in 14 years, due to charting at No.4 on the UK album chart on its release week. Reviews were limited, but four out of the five it received from major sources were positive.

=== Torpedo (2022–2023) ===
After the success of Tallulah Nicholas and Hirose immediately began work on a follow up album. The two wrote and recorded an album's worth of material across late 2019 and early 2020, with the album being largely complete outside of final audio mixing. However, progress halted with the onset of the COVID-19 pandemic in early 2020. Frustrated, Nicholas and Hirose turned to writing further material instead. Early sessions written during the COVID lockdown were slow, with Nicholas suffering with a case of writer's block. Eventually, his pent up frustration with both the state of the world, and his writer's block, lead to an outpouring of content, enough for two album's worth of material. The material was separated into two batches; the material written second - during the COVID lockdown - was put together to make up the Torpedo album, while the earlier, pre-COVID material, was put together for a later 2023 release on a yet-to-be-titled twelfth album. Torpedo, has subsequently been released as of 18 March 2022. The album would later chart at No.5 on the album charts, giving the band for the first time in their career consecutive Top 5 albums.

At the start of 2023, Feeder played at Littlecote House in Wiltshire. This would ultimately turn out to be live keyboard player Dean Deavall's last ever gig with the band; he has not appeared at any shows since.

=== Black/Red (2023–present) ===
In October 2023, the band announced a new album, and released two singles on the same day, "Playing With Fire" and "ELF". Black/Red was released on 5 April 2024. It was the band's first double album, completing a trilogy begun with Torpedo. Nicholas explained of the album: "I really wanted the album to be split in two parts for the listener, CD1 and CD2, black and red rather than be one long player, almost like a musical production with an interval."

== Sales and legacy ==
Between 1997 and 2012, Feeder accumulated 25 top 75 singles when guest singles are excluded. They have headlined many of the UK's major venues, such as Wembley Arena, Birmingham National Indoor Arena, Birmingham LG Arena, Bournemouth International Centre and the Cardiff International Arena.

Feeder's overall album sales stand at 1,957,016 in the United Kingdom, as of 6 October 2017. Their second-highest selling release is 2002's Comfort in Sound, shifting over 506,000 units in the UK as of October 2016. As of October 2017, The Singles has sold 524,000 copies. In the UK, Feeder has accumulated seven gold and platinum records. Gold records in Ireland for The Singles, Comfort in Sound and Echo Park brings their worldwide total to ten. In 2024, "Buck Rogers" received a Platinum award for 600,000 UK consumption sales, 23 years after its release. 2001's "Just a Day" was certified Gold in 2023 for 400,000 consumption sales. That same year also seen 1997's Polythene, receive a Gold award from the BPI for sales of 100,000; almost 20 years to its release date.

Despite having dropped out of mainstream radio play since 2008, Silent Cry reached No. 8 on the UK albums chart in its first week of release, with 16,000 units sold. It has sold less than 50,000 units to date according to Chrysalis, the owners of the now defunct Echo Label. The Silent Cry tour was Feeder's longest, playing 29 dates, with many selling out. Nevertheless, Silent Cry remains Feeder's first album not to achieve at least gold status.

2010's Renegades was less successful. It entered the UK chart at No. 16 – Feeder's first album since 1997's Polythene not to chart within the Top 10 – and dropped out after 2 weeks. However, the charting of Renegades, marked the third decade in which a Feeder album had been released and charted at least in the Top 20. This marked their 6th studio album to appear in the Top 20 and the band's 9th album to appear on the chart regardless of position over the course of their career. The album also debuted at No. 1 on the Official UK Rock Albums chart. Still, Renegades has yet to accumulate sales that approach or eclipse any of their other studio albums before this. 2012 follow-up Generation Freakshow, charted higher at No. 13 although on lower debut week sales, before 2016 saw the band return to the top 10 with All Bright Electric, then less than 12 months later appeared in the top 10 again, with The Best of Feeder in 2017. 2019's Tallulah, became the band's first top 5 studio album since 2005's Pushing the Senses.

In October 2003, the bass guitar that Taka Hirose played in the video for "Seven Days in the Sun" was added to the Hard Rock Cafe in Cardiff.

Feeder's most recent seven studio albums have all charted in the top 200 in Japan. Their most successful of these is 2008's Silent Cry charting at No. 53, although their only top 40 entry to date is their 2006 singles compilation.

In April 2012, Total Guitar praised the band, writing that "all the way from their first release, the Two Colours EP in 1995, through tragedy and triumph, he's [Grant] gone the distance with Feeder, while other British alternative rock bands of the 90s crashed or faded".

They were inducted into Kerrang's Hall of Fame in August 2019. Their induction came two months after Grant presented Skunk Anansie with their Hall of Fame award at the Kerrang Awards ceremony. This event marked the first time in ten years that Grant Nicholas had shared the same stage with former drummer Mark Richardson.

== Members ==
Current members

- Grant Nicholas – lead vocals, lead guitar, keyboards, percussion (1994–present)
- Taka Hirose – bass guitar, backing vocals (1995–present)

Current session musicians

- Karl Brazil – drums, percussion (2009–present)
- Geoff Holroyde – drums, percussion (2019–present)

Current touring musicians

- Geoff Holroyde – drums, percussion (2016–present)
- Dean Tidey – rhythm guitar (1999–2000, 2002–2009, 2026–present)

Former members

- Jon Lee – drums, percussion (1994–2002; his death)
- Mark Richardson – drums, percussion (2002–2009; guest 2025)

Former touring musicians

- Matt Sime – keyboards (2001–2002)
- Tim Trotter – drums, percussion (2009–2011)
- Damon Wilson – drums, percussion (2011–2013)
- Nathan Connolly – rhythm guitar (2016)
- Dean Deavall – keyboards, backing vocals (2008–2023)
- Tommy Gleeson – rhythm guitar, backing vocals (2016–2025)

Timeline

== Discography ==
Studio albums

- Polythene (1997) (Note: Swim, which was released a year prior and was originally a mini-album consisting of six tracks, is today considered an album due to amendments over the years in UK Album Chart rules that define an album. Polythene is however considered by the band to be their "first studio album" despite classification made by The Official Charts Company (OCC).)
- Yesterday Went Too Soon (1999)
- Echo Park (2001)
- Comfort in Sound (2002)
- Pushing the Senses (2005)
- Silent Cry (2008)
- Renegades (2010)
- Generation Freakshow (2012)
- All Bright Electric (2016)
- Tallulah (2019)
- Torpedo (2022)
- Black/Red (2024)

== Awards and honours ==
Kerrang! Awards (2)

Year	Award	Category
2001	Kerrang! Awards	Best British Live Act
2003	Kerrang! Awards	Best British Band

BT Digital Music Awards (1)

Year	Work	Category
2003	Just the Way I’m Feeling	Best Music Video Online

Welsh Music Awards (1)

Year	Work	Category
2005	Pushing the Senses	Best Album

Official No.1 Awards (11)

Year	Award	Work
2001	No.1 Independent Single	"Buck Rogers"
2001	No.1 Independent Single	“Turn"
2002	No.1 Independent Single	"Come Back Around"
2002	No.1 Independent Album	Comfort in Sound
2005	No.1 Independent Single	"Tumble and Fall"
2005	No.1 Independent Single	"Feeling a Moment"
2005	No.1 Independent Single	"Shatter / Tender"
2008	No.1 Independent Single	"We Are the People"
2010	No.1 Rock Chart Album	Renegades
2019	No.1 Independent Album	Tallulah
2022	No.1 Independent Album	Torpedo

Official Top 10 Awards (14)

Year	Award	Work
1999	Top 10 Album	Yesterday Went Too Soon
2001	Top 10 Single	"Buck Rogers"
2001	Top 10 Album	Echo Park
2002	Top 10 Album	Comfort in Sound
2003	Top 10 Single	"Just the Way I'm Feeling"
2005	Top 10 Single	"Tumble and Fall"
2005	Top 10 Album	Pushing the Senses
2006	Top 10 Album	The Singles
2008	Top 10 Album	Silent Cry
2016	Top 10 Album	All Bright Electric
2017	Top 10 Album	The Best of Feeder
2019	Top 10 Album	Tallulah
2022	Top 10 Album	Torpedo
2024	Top 10 Album	Black / Red

Kerrang! Radio Hall of Fame (1)

Year	Award	Category
2019	Hall of Fame	Outstanding Services to Rock

Certified sales awards (14)

Album	Silver	Gold	Platinum
Polythene		UK	
Yesterday Went Too Soon		UK	
Echo Park		Ireland	UK
Comfort in Sound		Ireland	UK
Pushing the Senses		UK	
The Singles		Ireland	UK
The Best of Feeder	UK		

Single	Silver	Gold	Platinum
"Buck Rogers"			UK
"Just a Day"		UK	
"Just the Way I'm Feeling"	UK		
"Feeling a Moment"	UK		
