= Mark Richardson (musician) =

British musician

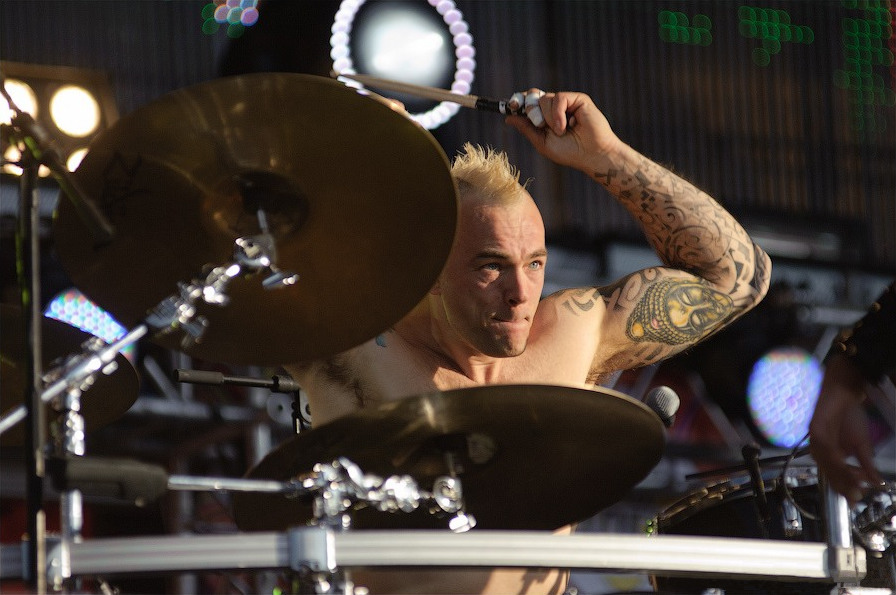
- Mark Richardson playing with Skunk Anansie at Rock on the Volga River in 2011

Background information
- Born: Mark Richardson; 28 May 1970 (age 56); Leeds, England
- Occupations: Musician; lifecoach; videographer; photographer
- Instrument: Drums
- Years active: 1991–present

Mark Richardson (born 28 May 1970) is an English drummer, known for being a member of the English rock group Skunk Anansie and formerly of Little Angels and Feeder.

== Music ==
=== Little Angels (December 1991 – July 1994) ===
Born in Leeds, Richardson grew up in Whitby, and went to college in Scarborough where he met the young Little Angels, (who were still performing as 'Mr. Thrud' at the time) "I got to know them a bit, then eventually started helping them out loading their gear.".

In 1991 their drummer Michael Lee left to join The Cult. (Matt Sorum had left The Cult to join Guns N' Roses after their drummer, Steven Adler, had been fired due to his growing drug habit.)

Whilst auditioning drummers - bassist Plunkett & guitarist Dickinson returned to Scarborough and played with Richardson whilst there. Realising they didn't need to audition further, with Richardson being an old friend as well, he was the perfect person to replace Lee. He was initially invited to replace some drum machine tracks on demos, (something Richardson saw as them testing him out) and eventually welcomed into the band.

In 1992 Little Angels wrote and recorded Jam, the band's third record on Polydor. It entered the UK album charts at number one upon release in February 1993, though Richardson didn't play on all the sessions - Pete Thomas of Elvis Costello's band contributed instead with Richardson commenting;

“They were up front about it, They needed someone who’d been in the business and could come into the studio and give them what they needed, which I couldn’t do. I used it as my apprenticeship and picked his brains. I had two choices, I could throw my toys out of my pram, and probably have to leave, and they’d get somebody else, or behave and be mature about it and just accept it, which is what I did.”

"Pete Thomas recorded a bit of it, and I recorded some of it. Because I came in late and it was a big expensive studio, they needed to guarantee that they were going to get it down."

Richardson's first ever professional engagement with Little Angels was on the 'Jim'll Fix It' show, a kids prime time TV show that helped children fulfil their dreams.

Despite touring extensively in Europe, stadium supports slots with Bryan Adams, Van Halen and Bon Jovi, adding to their already large fan base in the UK, the band split in the summer of 1994.

=== b.l.o.w (June 1994 – May 1995) ===
After Little Angels split, Richardson joined his bandmates Bruce John Dickinson (guitar) and Jimmy Dickinson (keys), in a new venture with vocalist Dave Gooding (David 9 Lunas) and bassist Nicky Boyes.

b.l.o.w. released their first "mini" album, Man and Goat Alike, within 5 months of getting together. The album itself was recorded in just four days at Jacob's Studios in Surrey. b.l.o.w. was soon out on the road, playing alongside the likes of Thunder, and famously held a competition to camp in fans' back gardens on tour because they couldn't afford hotels. Feeder supported them on this tour in support of their first EP 'Swim.'

Presenting a distinctly "homegrown" image, b.l.o.w. issued demo tapes to fan club subscribers & released their first mini-album through mail order in music magazine Kerrang! before it was available in the shops.

=== Skunk Anansie (August 1995 – 2001 and April 2009 – present) ===
Richardson joined Skunk Anansie in August 1995 after meeting them at the Kerrang! Awards. Skunk Anansie were looking for a permanent replacement for Robbie France so an audition was set up and Skunk were reborn. His first job with the band was to record some movie soundtrack music for the film Strange Days followed by the video for Charity. His first gig with the band was the Leeds Heineken festival. Skunk went on to tour extensively around the world, covering the globe many times over the next six years. Most notable support tours were Therapy? and Lenny Kravitz in Europe and Sevendust, Rollins Band, Rammstein in the US. Skunk Anansie enjoyed success in the UK Charts with three Top 20 albums. Richardson played drums on their second album Stoosh in 1996 and their third album Post Orgasmic Chill in 1999. These albums were both certified platinum and gold in the UK respectively, and both sold over five and a half million copies worldwide. Richardson also plays on the tracks from Paranoid and Sunburnt at Skunk's live shows. Richardson re-joined Skunk Anansie, after playing two gigs in April at the Water Rats venue in Kings Cross, London. A singles compilation Smashes and Trashes was released in November 2009 with a tour to follow. 2010 saw the band record a brand new record 'Wonderlustre' followed by a European arena tour and festival season of 45 festivals in 2011. Black Traffic followed in 2012 and Skunk hit the road again in Europe and playing more arenas and another 40 odd festivals in the summer of 2013. In September 2013 they played a sold out acoustic show at London's Cadogan Hall and released 'An Acoustic Skunk Anansie Live In London' to critical acclaim. The band again hit the road in Europe in support of the release.

=== Feeder (January 2002 – April 2009) ===
In January 2002, Feeder's drummer Jon Lee died from suicide in his Miami home. Richardson was recommended to Feeder's frontman—Grant Nicholas— by Jeremy Lascelles and became their new drummer. Richardson had previously worked with Feeder when they supported b.l.o.w. as well as Skunk Anansie. His first gig with Feeder was a warm-up for the Reading and Leeds Festivals in 2002, at the Portsmouth Wedgewood Rooms on 21 August. Richardson recorded drums on 2002's Comfort In Sound, 2005's Pushing the Senses, tracks for 2006's The Singles album and 2008's Silent Cry. All of these albums including Comfort in Sound (his first album with Feeder) made the Top 10 of the UK Albums Chart. On 6 May 2009, it was announced that Richardson would be rejoining Skunk Anansie for their upcoming reformation.

On 27 September 2025, Richardson made a special guest appearance at the Brixton Academy on Feeder’s Comfort in Sound Anniversary Tour. He would later appear again with the band on 2 October at Manchester Academy.

=== Sessions ===
Steve Robson, Sunna, Amy Macdonald, Globus, Ace (solo), Skin (solo), Mel B, Erika.

== Music support ==
Richardson is a co-founder and trustee of the charity Music Support. He said: 'When I tried to get sober in 2000, any information on how to achieve that was rare and hard sought. Mental health challenges including addiction weren't discussed openly very much at all back then because there was so much stigma attached to it. So I wanted to be a part of reducing that problem, reducing the stigma and providing information to others who maybe struggling with similar issues. Almost 60% of entertainment industry workers have sought help for mental health issues and 40% of those have been diagnosed with some form of mental health challenge. So myself, Johan Sorensen (of Portobello Behavioural Health), tour manager Andy Franks and manager Matt Thomas created the idea that would eventually grow into Music Support. We achieved charitable status in 2016 and are a non-profit collective of volunteers and professionals providing help and support for individuals in any area of the music industry suffering from addiction, emotional or mental health challenges.'

== Children in Need ==
On 12 November 2021, Richardson assisted BBC weather presenter Owain Wyn Evans by musically directing his 24 hour drumathon for Children in Need, raising £3,601,138 for the children's charity.
