= Comfort in Sound =

Studio album by Feeder
- Released: 21 October 2002
- Recorded: 2002
- Genres: Alternative rock; post-grunge; post-Britpop
- Length: 48:04
- Label: Echo
- Producers: Gil Norton; Grant Nicholas

Feeder chronology
Echo Park (2001)	Comfort in Sound (2002)	Picture of Perfect Youth (2004)

Singles from Comfort in Sound
- 1. "Come Back Around" Released: 30 September 2002; 2. "Just the Way I'm Feeling" Released: 13 January 2003; 3. "Forget About Tomorrow" Released: 5 May 2003; 4. "Find the Colour" Released: 22 September 2003; 5. "Comfort in Sound" Released: 6 December 2003

Comfort in Sound is the fourth studio album by Welsh rock band Feeder, released on 21 October 2002 and also the first to be released by the band after the suicide of drummer Jon Lee earlier in the year. The album was recorded at RAK Studios in London during most of 2002, and was produced by Gil Norton.

The band returned to live performance after Lee's suicide, playing low-key slots at various festivals in the United Kingdom, before releasing the single "Come Back Around" and then the album. Three further singles—"Just the Way I'm Feeling", "Forget About Tomorrow" and "Find the Colour"—followed the album's release. The album received positive reviews from the music press and was received well by the public, reaching number six on the UK Albums Chart. The album also gave the band their second top ten single, "Just the Way I'm Feeling".

In late 2003 or sometime in 2004 the album passed 400,000 sales. This made the album eligible for a Platinum Sales Award from the Independent Music Companies Association (IMPALA) for sales of 400,000 in Europe, therefore making it one of the best selling Independent albums of all time within the Continent. In June 2008 it passed 501,000 and stands on 512,359 as of March 2022. Sales outside the UK and Ireland are unknown, but are believed to be minimal.

Inside the inlay, there were also a number of illustrations by Aya Takano, including a picture per song for four of these only, each with a lyrical extract. The first three of these were released as singles from the album, all in their order of appearance in the booklet, which led to beliefs that the fourth song "Comfort in Sound", would be the fourth single, only for "Find the Colour" to be released in its place instead.

In late 2016, Comfort in Sound was played in full on Kerrang! Radio, as part of a classic albums series. Later on in February 2017, the album was inducted into Virgin Radio's "Classic Albums Vault".

== Release ==
The album was given a low-key promotional build up due to the death of drummer Jon Lee. Before the album's release, the band played a warm-up show at the Portsmouth Wedgewood Rooms prior to performing at the Reading and Leeds festivals and at the Gig on the Green. Kerrang! magazine gave a rating of 5/5 (KKKKK), for the band's performance at Reading. Part of the band's appearance on the main stage at the 2003 Glastonbury Festival was featured on BBC Three and the full set was broadcast on BBC Radio 1 later in the year. The band went on to play an arena tour at the end of the year, with high ticket sales and selling out at the Bournemouth International Centre.

Lead single "Come Back Around" had its first airplay on BBC Radio 1's "The Evening Session" show, and was A-listed by the station. The song was originally recorded as an instrumental demo in 2001, with the lyrics shortly written afterwards. After Lee's suicide, Grant Nicholas re-wrote the lyrics to relate to their friend and colleague's death: when the final version was recorded with Mark Richardson on drums. A completely instrumental version of the album was issued to television and radio media.

== Reception ==
Professional ratings
Review scores
Source	Rating
AllMusic	3/5 stars
Alternative Press	3/5
BBC Manchester	9/10
Contactmusic	(positive)
Entertainment Ireland	4/5 stars
The Guardian	3/5 stars
iAfrica.com	4.5/5 stars
Music Scene	4/5 stars
Rockzone	B+

The album was well received by critics and was a commercial success. It initially entered the charts at #6 before dropping out of the top 75 after only four weeks. It charted at No.178 on the 2002 year-end charts, selling just under 100,000 units. In 2003, the release of "Just the Way I'm Feeling" sent the album back to No.13 and helped it to No.66 in the 2003 end of year charts. The album re-entered the album charts in early 2005: in total, it spent 36 weeks in the top 75. As of October 2016, it has sold over 506,000 copies.

"Just the Way I'm Feeling" gained over 15,000 UK radio plays and charted at No.10 on the UK singles chart, with the previous single "Come Back Around" reaching No.14 (the band's then record label Echo predicted a Top 10 position). The next two singles "Forget About Tomorrow" and "Find The Colour", charted at positions No.12 and No.24 respectively.

=== Accolades ===
- #5 in Rocksound's 2002 albums list
- #37 in Q magazine's 2002 albums list
- #27 in Planet Sound's 2002 albums list (incorrectly listed as "Come Back Around")
- #32 in Kerrang! magazine's "Top 100 British Rock Albums of All Time"
- Rock Sound – "Album of the Month"
- Kerrang! – "Album of the Week"
- Metal Hammer – "Album of the Month"
- The Times – "Album of the Week"
- Virgin Radio – Classic Albums Vault inductee, February 2017

=== Award nomination ===
- "Best Album" at the 2003 Q Magazine Awards.

== 2025 Reissue ==
On 12 September 2025, remastered and expanded versions of Comfort in Sound were released on vinyl and 2CD formats. The reissue was accompanied by an album tour in the United Kingdom and Republic of Ireland in September and October 2025. The full album was played in its original order during each show. The B-side "Opaque" was played live for the first time during the opening show at O2 Academy Leeds.

'Comfort in Sound' is an album very close to our hearts and now feels like the right time to re-release it and let people re-discover it again or for the first time... We hit a brick wall after losing Jon, so as a writer I decided to put all those mixed feelings and emotions into writing songs of recovery. Those compositions became the ‘Comfort in Sound’ album, and I think it opened both myself up as a writer and the depth and soul of Feeder as a band.

— Grant Nicholas, Kerrang!

== Track listing ==
All tracks are written by Grant Nicholas.

No.	Title	Length
1.	"Just the Way I'm Feeling"	4:22
2.	"Come Back Around"	3:13
3.	"Helium"	3:15
4.	"Child in You"	3:27
5.	"Comfort in Sound"	3:46
6.	"Forget About Tomorrow"	3:51
7.	"Summer's Gone"	4:49
8.	"Godzilla"	2:05
9.	"Quick Fade"	4:24
10.	"Find the Colour" (omitted from first pressings of European release)	3:57
11.	"Love Pollution"	4:13
12.	"Moonshine"	6:49

Asian bonus tracks
No.	Title	Length
13.	"Opaque"	3:59
14.	"Emily"	4:42

=== 2025 Expanded Remaster Edition ===
Bonus disc track listing
No.	Title	Length
1.	"Feel It Again" (XXV Remix)	3:55
2.	"Godzilla II"	2:03
3.	"Opaque"	3:58
4.	"Bullet"	2:54
5.	"Forget About Tomorrow" (Orchestral Remix)	3:47
6.	"Just the Way I'm Feeling" (Orchestral Remix)	4:20
7.	"Love Pollution" (Orchestral Remix)	4:03
8.	"Lose the Fear"	3:14
9.	"Circles"	3:00
10.	"Broken"	3:22
11.	"Remember the Silence"	3:52
12.	"Bring It Together"	2:43
13.	"Redemption"	2:39

== Personnel ==
Feeder

- Grant Nicholas – vocals, guitars, keyboards, production, additional arrangements
- Taka Hirose – bass
- Mark Richardson – drums, percussion

Additional musicians

- Audrey Riley – string arrangements
- Enrico Tomasso – trumpet on "Helium"
- Charles Gillingham – accordion on "Quick Fade"
- Matt Page – piano

Production

- Gil Norton – production, additional arrangements
- Adrian Bushby – engineering, mixing
- Matt Sime – engineering, programming
- Feeder – mixing
- John Dunne – programming
- Bob Ludwig – mastering
- Aya Takano – artwork

== Charts ==
=== Weekly charts ===
Chart (2002–2003)	Peak position
Irish Albums (IRMA)	27
Scottish Albums (Official Charts)	4
UK Albums (Official Charts)	6

=== Year-end charts ===
Chart (2002)	Position
UK Albums (OCC)	178
Chart (2003)	Position
UK Albums (OCC)	66
