= Taka Hirose =

Japanese musician and chef (born 1967)

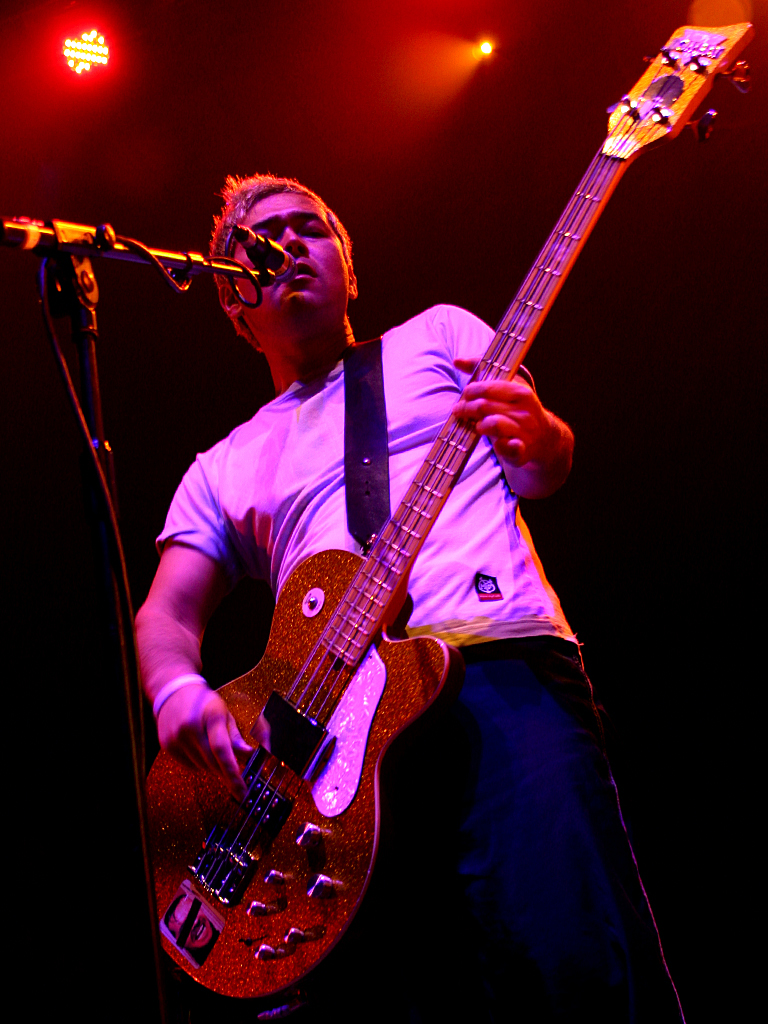
- On stage at the Cardiff CIA, 1 December 2005

Background information
- Also known as: Taka
- Born: Takashi Hirose; 28 July 1967 (age 59); Mizuho, Gifu, Japan
- Genres: Rock; pop rock; soft rock; post-grunge; grunge
- Occupations: Bass guitarist; multi-instrumentalist; chef
- Instruments: Bass guitar; keyboards; backing vocals
- Years active: 1995–present
- Labels: Echo; EMI
- Website: www.feederweb.com

Takashi Hirose (Japanese: タカ・ヒロセ (広瀬 隆), born 28 July 1967) is a Japanese musician who is the current bass guitarist for the rock band Feeder.

== Biography ==
Hirose began playing bass at the age of 14 in secondary school and played in several jazz and metal bands during his school years. After leaving school, he moved to Tokyo and worked for guitar manufacturing specialists ESP as well as working at night in a downtown bar.

In 1992 Hirose moved to London to study graphic design. After moving to London, Hirose planned to continue his musical activities, and answered an advertisement in the local Loot magazine from Grant Nicholas and Jon Lee, who were searching for a bassist in their new band, which would later become Feeder. A few days later, Hirose met Lee at Camden Station and they went back to Nicholas' house (63C St Augustines Road) where the band was officially formed.

As Feeder began to take off, Hirose began to consider quitting. He had only planned for his music to be a sideline, and was unwilling to give up his newspaper office job with The Chunichi Shimbun to do it professionally. Following persuasion from Nicholas and Lee, and supported by his wife, Hirose resigned from his previous occupation. After winning critical acclaim for their debut release Swim and their first full length album, Polythene, the band made their chart breakthrough with Top Ten follow-up Yesterday Went Too Soon. In January 2002, after Feeder had spent the previous year enjoying the success of their third album Echo Park, Lee killed himself at his house in Miami. Hirose returned to Japan to spend time with family and friends.

After deliberation, Hirose and Nicholas decided to continue, and set to work later that year on their fourth album Comfort in Sound, with Mark Richardson recruited as their new drummer. This was continued with the follow-up release Pushing The Senses. Both albums were commercial successes making the top 10 of the UK albums chart with a singles album released in 2006 also being well received. 2008's Silent Cry also made the top 10 but had a short chart life and became their smallest selling album, a decline which then continued with 2010's Renegades, which missed the top 10 but is still seen as an album that brought the band back to their roots and sees Karl Brazil on drums after Mark Richardson returned to Skunk Anansie.

Alongside his work with Feeder, Taka also works as an electronic music solo musician, often playing all the instruments alongside bass on a series of recordings under the alias name of "Funkybottom". He also has remixed Feeder tracks such as "Tracing Lines", as well as "Free Your Mind", a short 28 second interlude intended for Silent Cry which did not make the final cut. On the Funkybottom version, the remix extends the track with extra effects added in. He played on Inoran's 2011 single "Hide and Seek". In June 2012, he once again teamed up with Inoran, and Feeder's support guitarist Dean Tidey, to form the band Muddy Apes.

As a member of Feeder, Hirose was inducted into the Kerrang! Hall of Fame on 9 August 2019.

Taka also has a website containing many Japanese food recipes.
