= Jon Lee (drummer) =

Welsh drummer (1968-2002)

- Born: Jonathan Henry Lee; 28 March 1968; Newport, Wales
- Died: 7 January 2002 (aged 33) Miami, Florida, U.S.
- Genre: Rock
- Instrument: Drums
- Years active: 1992–2002
- Label: Echo
- Website: feederweb.com

Jonathan Henry Lee (28 March 1968 – 7 January 2002) was a Welsh drummer. He was the original drummer of the British rock band Feeder.

== Feeder and early career ==
Feeder were formed whilst Grant Nicholas was a producer, before moving to London to gain more experience. He had already met Lee in Newport who moved to London afterwards. They formed a band named Raindancer, who despite winning a TV slot on ITV Central never gained a record deal. Shortly before this, Lee was a member of Newport band The Darling Buds, although only appearing on a couple of b-sides of the "Sure Thing" single. Raindancer's split saw bassist John Canham part ways with the band, before Simon Blight followed soon after when they reformed as Hum, which was changed to Reel, before then changing their name once again to Real when Taka Hirose took over bass duties in 1995. The band signed to The Echo Label in November 1994 before changing their name to Feeder, with their debut single proper "Stereoworld" reaching number 128 in the UK charts in October 1996, while the second single "Tangerine" reached number 60. The first full-length album, Polythene, was released in May 1997. Produced by Chris Sheldon, it charted at number 65 in the UK and was certified Silver for sales over 60,000 copies in 2003 when the band had already broken through. Metal Hammer magazine included it in its Top 20 Albums of 1997 list at number 1. In 2017 the album would achieve Gold status, having sold 100,000 copies.

The follow-up album, Yesterday Went Too Soon, was produced by Nicholas. Released in August 1999, the album was a much quicker commercial success than its predecessor (entering the UK album chart at number 8 and certified Silver in 2001, with this being upgraded to Gold in 2003). The title track was the band's first UK Top 20 hit.

Two years later, the band released their third and also breakthrough album, Echo Park. Produced by Gil Norton (Foo Fighters, The Pixies, Echo & the Bunnymen and James), the album peaked at number 5 in the UK and was also certified Gold, but in its release year, before going platinum in 2003. It contained their debut Top 10 single "Buck Rogers".

After Lee's death in 2002, the band kept out of the public eye until Comfort in Sound was nearing its completion. The first play of its lead single "Come Back Around", was the first time since Lee's death that the band made any public appearances and released new material. The single charted at #14, while the follow-up "Just the Way I'm Feeling" made the Top 10. The album, which was also produced by Norton, charting one place lower than Echo Park had, and later became their first platinum seller. The album featured Mark Richardson of Skunk Anansie on drums; he parted company with Feeder in 2009, to return to a reformed Skunk Anansie. An instrumental demo of "Come Back Around" was recorded before Lee's death, with lyrics written later on by Nicholas. After his death, they were rewritten for the final version which Mark Richardson played on, keeping close to the original instrumental demo recording Lee made with the band.

== Death and aftermath ==
Lee died by suicide on 7 January 2002 at his home in Miami, Florida. His death was reported two days later on BBC Radio 1's Newsbeat programme. It was later reported that four suicide notes were found.

Lee's funeral took place at St. Mary's Church in Newport on 18 January 2002, where thousands of fans showed up alongside family and friends to pay their own respects. Matt Page, Feeder's manager, read "Do Not Stand at My Grave and Weep", as requested by Lee's father. Feeder's 1997 single "High" was also played during the ceremony, during which Grant Nicholas gave the following statement:

Jon had such a taste for life, which makes this whole thing such a mystery to us all. He could be the life and soul of any party. Yet, quiet, sensitive and understanding to anyone that needed a friendly ear. I always felt there was a raging fire in his soul which he channelled into his drumming; showing no fear to anything he put his hand to... hope you are at peace now, Jon boy. Forever young. Your friend always.

Feeder decided to continue, with Nicholas saying, "Jon would have wanted us to carry on." Later in the year, Nicholas was interviewed via telephone on BBC Radio One as Feeder were announced as one of the confirmed bands for that year’s Reading and Leeds Festivals. In the interview he mentioned that they had recorded ten tracks for a new album, while mentioning that they had been getting along well with their new drummer. Nicholas did not mention any names in the interview. It was later confirmed after much rumour, that this was the then former Skunk Anansie drummer Mark Richardson who had helped the band out on drum duties for their album Comfort in Sound and their subsequent live performances.

The band's first official live appearances after Lee's death were at the Reading/Leeds Festivals, as Portsmouth Wedgewood Rooms was a warm-up show. The Reading show, being the first, saw Nicholas dedicate "Quick Fade" to "absent friends". Thousands of fans turned up, with many being forced to watch outside as the tent went over capacity. The South Wales Argus noted the gig as a last ever opportunity for fans to collectively pay their final respects to Lee, having already earlier in the year been invited to attend Lee's funeral. Feeder's performance was given a positive review by the newspaper. Kerrang! would later give the band a perfect 5/5 score (KKKKK), for the same performance.

Earlier in the year, the band were invited by Melvin Benn, the owner of the festival to headline the first day of the main stage, having the year before played that stage fourth on the second day and attracting a large crowd, being the size normally seen with a headline act. The offer was soon refused as they did not want to play such a high-placed slot so soon after Lee's death, so requested to play a much more low-key slot headlining the second stage.

In 2003, Nicholas dedicated the band's win for "Best British Band" at the Kerrang! Awards to Lee, calling it the award he always wanted the band to win. In 2006, the band released a singles album, entitled The Singles in which Lee features on many of the album's tracks. The album quickly became a platinum seller and the second album Lee appeared on to do so. During his lifetime Feeder had one silver album and one gold, meaning his achievement as a multi-platinum selling recording artist occurred posthumously.

Richardson was made the band's permanent member for their fifth studio album Pushing the Senses in 2005. In 2006, an unreleased and incomplete 1998 recording named "Uptight" was released as a B-side on the "Lost and Found" single, with Nicholas recording the track's final vocals eight years after the initial 1998 recording. The song features Lee on drums and is to date the last released recording involving him.

Richardson left Feeder in 2009 to return to a reformed Skunk Anansie, before Karl Brazil took over the drums. Nicholas later claimed that the chemistry he feels between himself and Brazil is very much the same way that he felt with Lee. Feeder's 2012 album Generation Freakshow features the track "Hey Johnny" which was written in dedication to Lee. In 2017, Lee would make a posthumous return to the top 10 of the UK Albums Chart, when The Best of Feeder charted at number 10 in October of that year.

As a past member of Feeder, Lee was posthumously inducted into the Kerrang! Hall of Fame on 9 August 2019.
