= Grant Nicholas =

Welsh musician

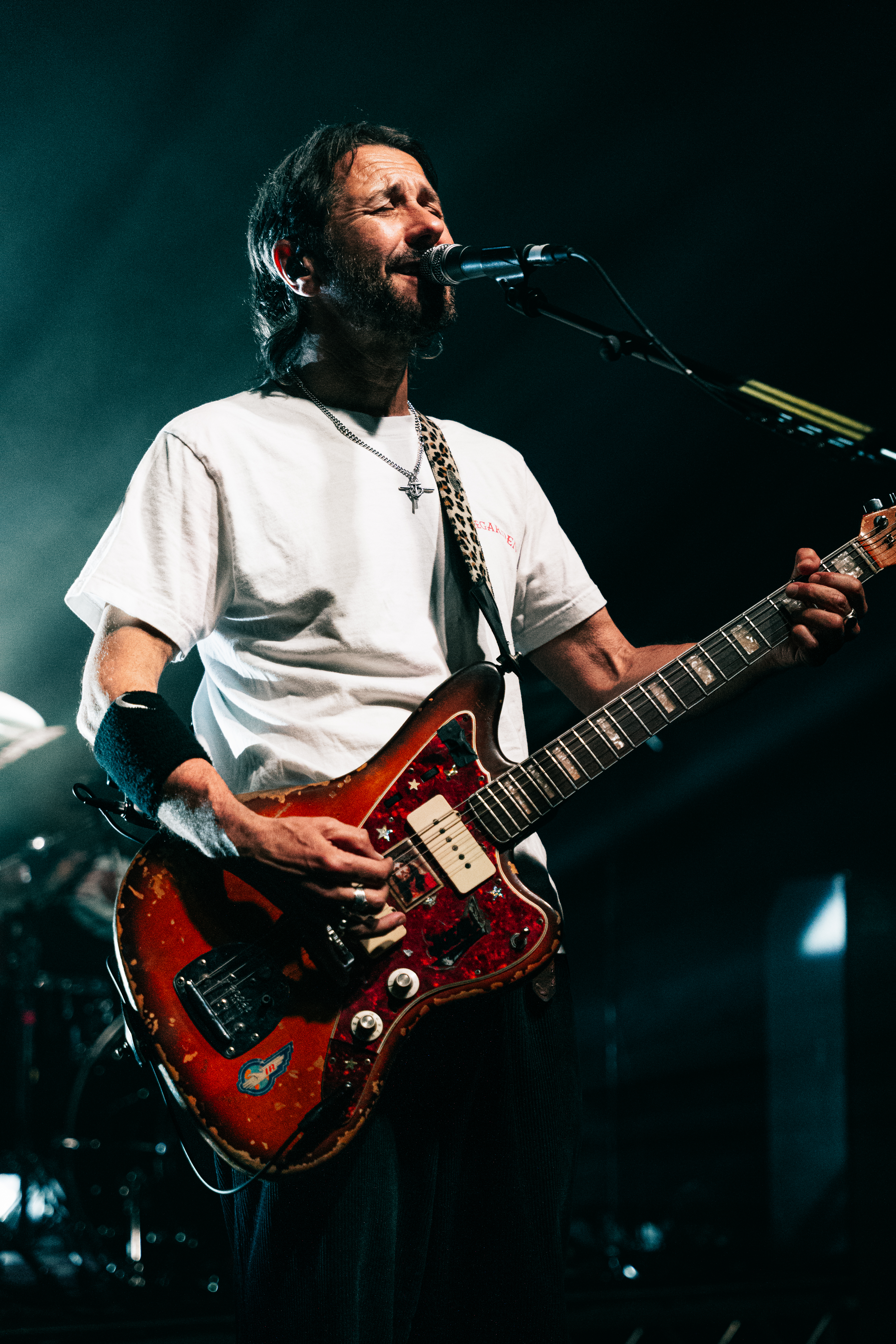
- Nicholas performing in 2025

Background information
- Born: Grantley Jonathan Nicholas; 12 November 1967 (age 58); Newport, Wales
- Genres: Alternative rock; rock; Britpop; post-grunge; grunge
- Occupations: Singer; songwriter; musician
- Instruments: Guitar; vocals; keyboards; percussion
- Years active: 1987–present

Grantley Jonathan Nicholas (born 12 November 1967) is a Welsh musician and the lead singer and guitarist of the rock band Feeder.

In 2014, Nicholas released his debut solo album Yorktown Heights. In the following year, a released a mini-album titled Black Clouds .

As frontman of Feeder, he has gained three platinum-certified albums, three gold-certified and one silver-certified album, two Kerrang awards, a Brit Award nomination, twenty top 40 singles, two silver-certified singles, one gold-certified single, one platinum-certified single and an induction into the Kerrang Radio Hall of Fame.

== Early years ==
Nicholas was born in Newport, South Wales, but grew up in Pwllmeyric near Chepstow. He was educated at Monmouth School. He performed in public for the first time at the age of 11 at school, and gained four O-levels (the predecessor to GCSEs), including an A grade in Art.

In school, Nicholas played the trumpet, and joined his first band, Sweet Leaf (named after a song by Black Sabbath, who were his favourite band in his school years, and the first he saw play live, at the Colston Hall in Bristol). He was promised his first guitar by his parents, as an incentive to pass his exams. He received the guitar, an Aron Les Paul copy after passing them.

Grant says he did not like the "cattle market" aspects of school and didn't work hard. His favourite bands at school included heavy metal bands such as Judas Priest and Black Sabbath.

== Guitars ==
Nicholas' "signature guitar" is a 1967 Sunburst Fender Jazzmaster. In addition to this, he also owns a 1964 Silver Jazzmaster (often tuned differently when used live) and another Sunburst 59 Jazzmaster. He is using Fender Telecasters more and more and has a 73 Sunburst Fender Telecaster a 63 Black Telecaster and a Blue Standard Telecaster.

His other guitars include a Cherry Red Gibson SG, a Fender Bellmaster, a Green Custom Jazzbird, a Green Jazzmaster (which he destroyed at Feeder's headline set at Download 2005 and later said he regretted it, but still has the neck to make a new guitar with), a Gibson Firebird, a custom ESP "Gibstang", a Sunburst Gibson J-200 Acoustic and a natural finish Yamaha acoustic (for recording). He uses a variety of different pedals and effects to produce the distinctive Feeder sound. His main amplifiers are: Vox AC30s, Fender Twins, Boogie and Marshall + Marshall and Orange Speaker Cabinets.

== Formative years ==
After leaving school Nicholas worked as a hair dresser in Cardiff and then a bike courier in London. It was while in London that Nicholas learnt how to be a songwriter. When he was 19, he joined a progressive rock band called Multi-Story as their singer. He released one album with the band called Through Your Eyes and they disbanded soon after. The album was not given any backing by FM Records, due to internal problems during and after recording. Original singer Paul Ford left, leading to Nicholas being recruited from local band Silent Partner: the latter re-recorded the previously laid-down vocals, while re-writing some lyrics to suit his style. It was the band's second and final album. After Multi-Story broke up, Nicholas joined Welsh nine-piece Temper Temper, where he met future Feeder drummer, Jon Lee. During these years. Nicholas found influence in alternative rock bands such as Nirvana, the Eels, Dinosaur Jr and Foo Fighters. He also enjoys movies such as Angel Heart and Taxi Driver.

== Feeder ==
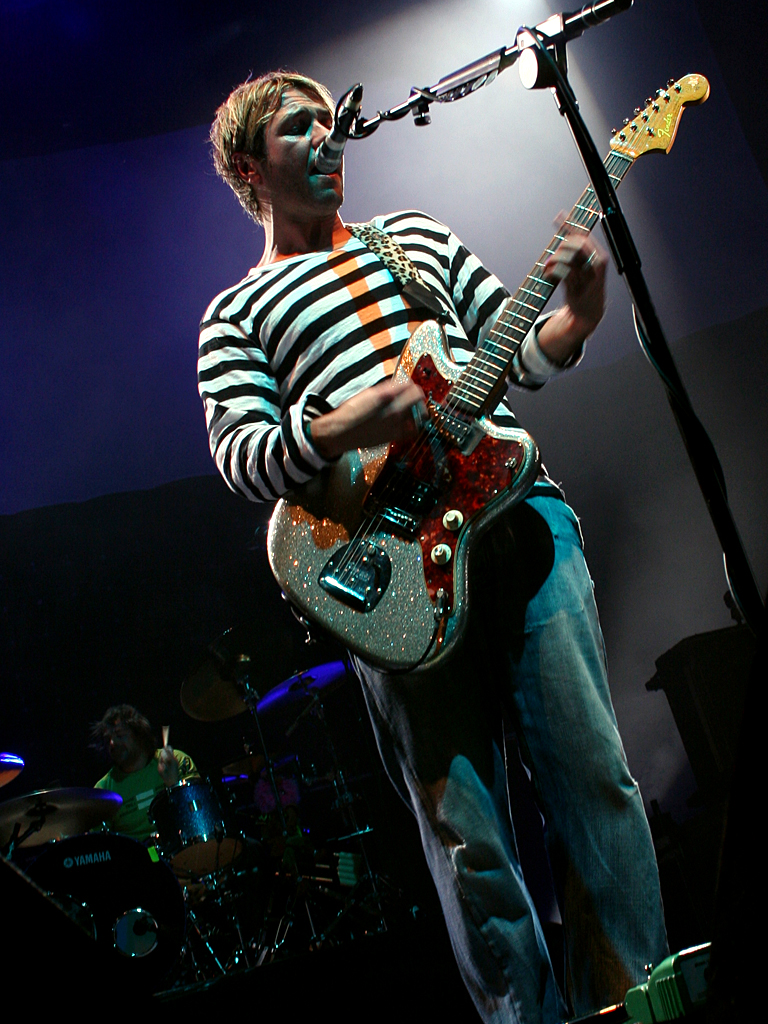
Nicholas performing in 2005

The band were formed whilst Nicholas was a producer, before moving to London to gain more experience. He had already met Jon Lee in Newport who moved down afterwards. They formed an electric/acoustic rock band named Raindancer, who despite winning a TV slot never gained a record deal. This saw bassist John Canham part ways with the band, before Simon Blight followed soon after when they reformed as Hum, which was changed to Reel, before then changing their name once again to Real in 1994 with their final name of Feeder being decided on that same year. A series of Reel recordings surfaced on eBay in early 2006. The band signed to The Echo Label in November of that year still under the name of Real, when this was changed to Feeder shortly afterwards, with London-based graphic designer Taka Hirose taking over bass duties in 1995. A year later in 1996, their debut single "Stereo World" reached number 128 on the UK charts during October 1996, while the second single "Tangerine" reached number 60. The first full-length album, Polythene, was released in May 1997. Produced by Chris Sheldon, it charted at number 65 in the UK and was certified silver for sales over 60,000 copies in 2003 when the band had already broken through (then upgraded to gold status for 100,000 copies in 2017). Metal Hammer magazine included it in its Top 20 Albums of 1997 list at number one.

The follow-up album, Yesterday Went Too Soon, was produced by Nicholas. Released in August 1999, the album was a much quicker commercial success than its predecessor (entering the UK Albums Chart at number 8 and certified silver in 2001, with this being upgraded to gold in 2003). The title track was the band's first UK top 20 hit.

Two years later, the band released their third and also breakthrough album, Echo Park. Produced by Gil Norton (Foo Fighters, Pixies, Echo & the Bunnymen and James), the album peaked at number 5 in the UK and was also certified gold in its release year, before going platinum in 2003. It contained their first top 10 single "Buck Rogers".

In 2002, drummer Jon Lee took his own life, which saw the band keep out of the public eye, until their fourth album Comfort in Sound was nearing its completion. The first play of its lead single "Come Back Around" on the Radio 1 The Evening Session show, was the first time since Lee's death that the band made any public appearance and released new material, while a few days before this Grant was interviewed on the station, in which he spoke of their first shows without Lee. The single charted at No. 14, while the follow-up "Just the Way I'm Feeling" made the top 10; both singles appeared on Comfort in Sound, also produced by Norton, which although charting one place lower than Echo Park, became their first platinum seller. The album featured Mark Richardson of Skunk Anansie on drums, before he parted company with Feeder in 2009, to return to a reformed Skunk Anansie.

Follow-up Pushing the Senses in 2005 (also produced by Norton) was not as successful; although it did not go platinum, it still went gold and charted at number 2 while also containing their third top 10 and second top five single "Tumble and Fall", and the more notable "Feeling a Moment". 2006 saw their singles compilation also chart at number 2 and achieve platinum status. To date, this is the last Feeder album to go top 5 or be certified, although their next four albums Silent Cry, Renegades, Generation Freakshow and All Bright Electric all charted in the top 20. All of these were produced by Nicholas, although Chris Sheldon also produced Generation Freakshow.

After 25 years since forming, Feeder were inducted into the Kerrang! Radio Hall of Fame on 9 August 2019, for "Distinguished Services to Rock".

== Solo career ==
In early 2014, Grant Nicholas announced that he was recording a solo album. The song "Soul Mates" premiered on the Dermot O'Leary show on Radio 2 on Saturday 31 May. The same track was made available for a limited time as a free download.

His debut solo album Yorktown Heights was released on 11 August 2014, via Popping Candy, although in Japan it was released a few months earlier on Victor. Yorktown Heights was produced, written and played by Grant in his North London Treehouse Studio, The Crypt (London) and Angelic Studios in Banbury. Help at the controls came from Sam Miller & Brian Sperber at his Ansons Pocket Studio in Yorktown Heights, upstate New York.

The idea to record a solo album, came about after Feeder's gig at the Brixton Academy in late 2012. During this time Grant decided after 20 years without any time off, give Feeder a break for a short time while deciding to use the time to record and promote a solo album. After shows in July and June 2014 at The Slaughtered Lamb and Sebright Arms in London, Yorktown Heights charted at #29 on the UK album charts, which was seen as a success due to a lack of promotion from mainstream and alternative radio, while reviews mainly came from lesser known sources.

After the release of the album, Grant continued to tour and played the Fuji Rock Festival in Japan along the way. After ending 2014 with a show at the Islington Assembly Hall, Grant announced that due to the success of the album and supporting tour, alongside how much he's enjoyed the experience, more solo shows were announced for 2015.

After the 2015 tour, a mini-album titled Black Clouds was released before the "Everyday Society" single was released for Record Store Day, bringing Grant's solo career to a close. Feeder later resumed activity with their 2016 album All Bright Electric, and the 2017 compilation album The Best of Feeder which included new material on the bonus album Arrow. Both albums featured tracks originally intended for the solo album, but were re-recorded for Feeder ("Slint" and "Veins", which maintains the original vocal track). Some have yet to see the light of day, being "Rats" and "The Wall's Around Us".

Grant would later close down Popping Candy and Big Teeth Music, before closing down his solo career website and Twitter handle.

== Personal life ==
Nicholas has a Japanese wife named Kana. They had their first child, a girl named Hana Sky, in 2005 and their second child, a boy named Ko Marley, in 2007. They live together in Crouch End, London. He is also follower of football and supports Arsenal F.C. although he also once admitted he does not follow the sport as much as his bandmates. He considers himself an "old school" gamer.

== Other work ==
Nicholas remixed the track "Ya Don't See the Signs" by the now defunct rap group Mark B and Blade, who had released the original version as their first single. Nicholas gave the rap track a rock guitar backing different from the original's hip hop sound. This was added as an extra track to their 2000 album, The Unknown. This version came to the fore when used for the opening credits of the Sky Sports Saturday morning show, Soccer AM. In 2001, the new version, subtitled the "Grant Nicholas Remix", was released as a single and reached No. 23 in the United Kingdom.

Nicholas spent the last few weeks of 2006 co-producing rock band EnjoyDestroy's debut album with Brian Sperber, who later split. He was featured on an episode of Never Mind the Buzzcocks in 2008, his second appearance on the show after making his debut in 1999. In 2003, Nicholas sang on "Broken", a Junkie XL song from his album Radio JXL: A Broadcast from the Computer Hell Cabin.

== Awards ==
As a member of Feeder, Nicholas has won two Kerrang! Awards in 2001 and 2003 for Best British Live Act and Best British Band, respectively. Nicholas would later dedicate the latter to Jon Lee in which he said that particular award was the one he always wanted Feeder to win. Kerrang! Radio would later in 2019 induct Feeder into their Hall of Fame for "Distinguished Services to Rock". The award plaque is seen in his Treehouse Studio whenever he performs acoustic sessions.

== Popular culture ==
In a Christmas special of the UK gameshow Pointless Celebrities, which was broadcast on 21 December 2013, Nicholas was a "Pointless answer" in a Band Aid 20 round, in which contestants had to identify from the official photo, participants on the recording. All of the members of Snow Patrol were also pointless answers.

Nicholas appeared in an episode of Salvage Hunters: Classic Cars. The programme's hosts renovated a Fiat 130 car in the hope of selling to classic car enthusiasts. Amongst a gathering of interested buyers, Nicholas can be seen in the crowd.
