= Feeder discography =

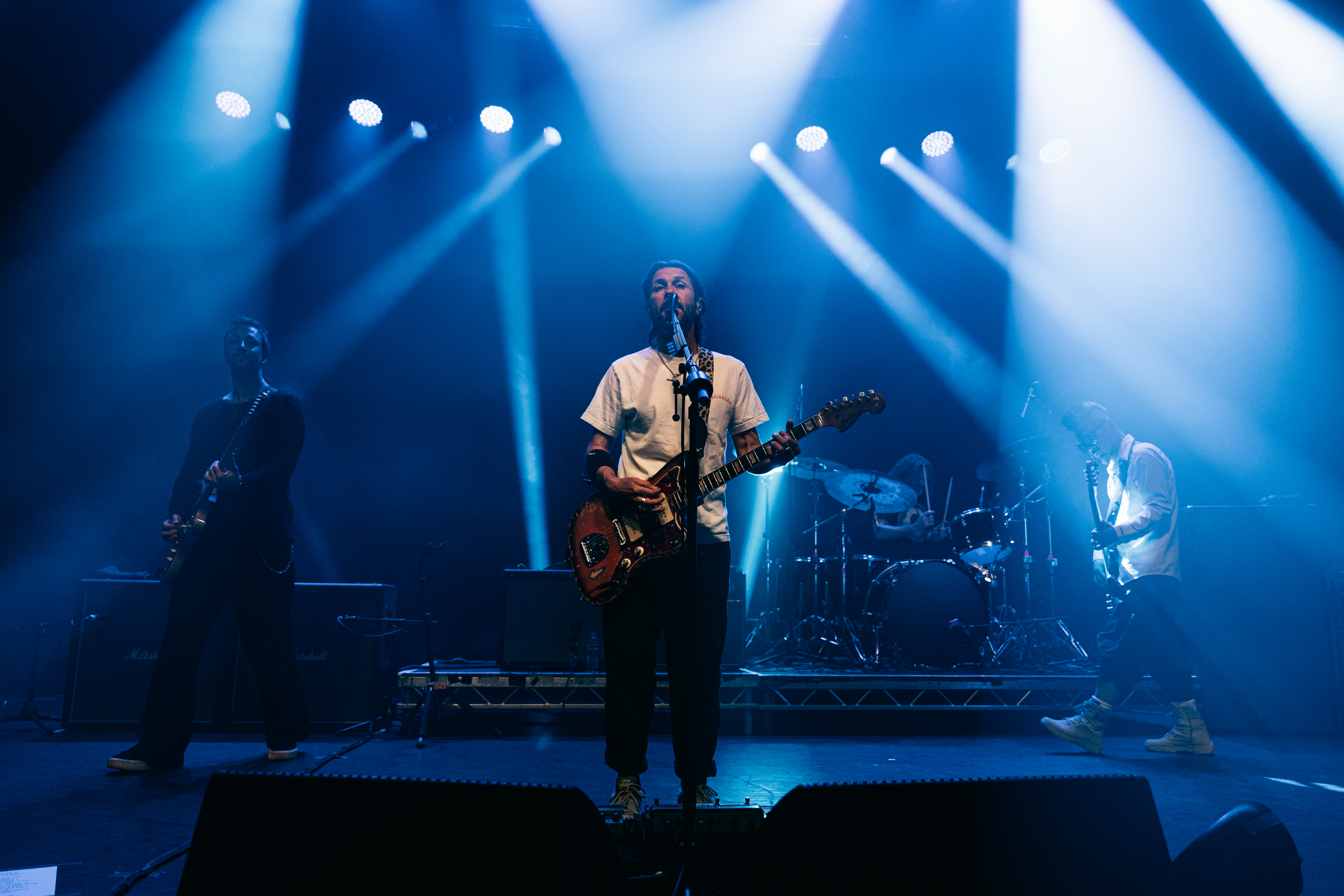
- Feeder in 2025
- Studio albums: 12
- Extended plays: 4
- Compilation albums: 12
- Singles: 40
- Music videos: 50

The discography of Feeder, a Welsh-Japanese rock band that formed in 1994, consists of twelve studio albums, twelve compilation albums, four extended plays (EP), and forty singles on The Echo Label, their own label Big Teeth Music, Cooking Vinyl and BMG as well as forty-nine music videos. Alongside charting fifteen Top 75 albums domestically, they also have 25 Top 75 singles. In 2022 Feeder became one of a few artists in UK Album Chart history, to achieve top 10 albums in at least four different decades (1990s, 2000s, 2010s and 2020s).

An original incarnation of the band was formed in 1992 under the name of "Reel" by the remaining members Grant Nicholas, Jon Lee and Simon Blight of electroacoustic group Raindancer, after the departure of their guitarist John Canham, although Simon Blight departed in 1992 to make way for Taka Hirose in 1994, after the band had used many session bassists from 1992 to 1994. Feeder's lineup after signing with The Echo Label in the same year of their formation consisted of Grant Nicholas (guitar/vocals) Jon Lee (drums) and Taka Hirose (bass), while demos sent out to radio and venues to gain gigs still featured session bassists. In January 2002, Jon Lee died by suicide at home in Miami. Former Skunk Anansie drummer Mark Richardson began to record and play with the band before being made an official member. In May 2009 he left Feeder to reform Skunk Anansie. Since Richardson's departure, Feeder have variously employed drummers Karl Brazil, Damon Wilson, Tim Trotter, and Geoff Holroyde for recording and touring work.

Feeder's music has been inspired by a wide variety of artists and styles, including The Police, Nirvana and Smashing Pumpkins. The band's sound was radically changed from that of Rain Dancer on their debut release the Two Colours EP (1995), but has since introduced more acoustic aspects to their music, including elements of pianos and string orchestras.

Feeder garnered media attention in 2001 for their third album, Echo Park and its lead single "Buck Rogers", which later become a UK Top five single. In 2002, the band released their fourth album Comfort in Sound, being their first since the loss of their drummer Jon Lee earlier in the year. The album touched on many themes of loss and coming to terms with death, although it also explored themes of positivity. Despite not being amongst their five top five albums, Comfort in Sound is Feeder's most successful studio album to date, selling over 507,277 copies in the United Kingdom between October 2002 and October 2017.

After the campaign for their 2006 singles compilation was complete, the band would later drop out of mainstream radio attention, while still charting seven more top 20 albums with the latest being 2022's Torpedo, making the top five and became the first time the band would have back to back top five studio albums.

== Albums ==
=== Studio albums ===
List of albums, with selected chart positions and certifications
Title	Album details	Peak chart positions										Sales	Certifications (sales thresholds)
Title	Album details	UK	AUT	BEL	EU	FRA	IRL	JPN	NLD	SCO	SWI	Sales	Certifications (sales thresholds)
Polythene	Released: 15 May 1997; Re-issued: 20 October 1997; Label: Echo (ECHCD15); Format: CD, CS, LP	65	—	—	—	—	—	—	—	—	—		BPI: Gold
Yesterday Went Too Soon	Released: 30 August 1999; Label: Echo (ECHCD28); Format: CD, CS, LP, Ltd CD	8	—	—	—	—	—	—	—	16	—		BPI: Gold
Echo Park	Released: 23 April 2001; Label: Echo (ECHCD34); Format: CD, CS, LP, MD	5	—	—	—	—	54	—	—	4	—	UK: 332,000	BPI: Platinum; IRMA: Gold
Comfort in Sound	Released: 21 October 2002; Label: Echo (ECHCD43); Format: CD, CS, LP, CD/DVD, SACD	6	—	—	—	—	27	98	—	4	—	UK: 519,073	BPI: Platinum; IRMA: Gold
Pushing the Senses	Released: 31 January 2005; Label: Echo (ECHCD60); Format: CD, CD/DVD, LP	2	62	61	11	188	16	59	80	4	75		BPI: Gold
Silent Cry	Released: 16 June 2008; Label: Echo (ECHCD79); Format: CD, deluxe CD, LP, iTunes Deluxe	8	—	—	29	—	82	53	—	12	—		
Renegades	Released: 5 July 2010; Label: Big Teeth Music (BTMCD004); Format: CD, LP, deluxe CD, Asda edition, iTunes deluxe	16	—	—	—	—	—	93	—	18	—		
Generation Freakshow	Released: 23 April 2012; Label: Big Teeth Music (BTMCD009); Format: CD, LP, iTunes deluxe	13	—	—	—	—	97	57	—	12	—	9,019	
All Bright Electric	Released: 7 October 2016; Label: Cooking Vinyl (COOKLP651); Format: CD, deluxe CD, LP, cassette, digital download	10	—	193	—	—	66	167	—	10	—		
Tallulah	Released: 9 August 2019; Label: Believe Music (FEE001CD); Format: CD, LP, digital download	4	—	—	—	—	—	174	—	4	66		
Torpedo	Released: 18 March 2022; Label: Big Teeth Music (BTCD0021); Format: CD, LP, digital download	5	—	181	—	—	—	—	—	3	—		
Black/Red	Released: 5 April 2024; Label: Big Teeth Music (BTCD003); Format: CD, LP, digital download	8	—	—	—	—	—	—	—	5	—		
"—" denotes releases that did not chart.

=== Video Albums ===
List of albums, with selected details and chart positions
Title	Album details	Peak chart positions
Title	Album details	JPN
Sonic Bridges Tour 2025 (with Ellegarden)	Released: 5 August 2026; Label: Universal Music Japan (UPXH-20151); Formats: DVD, Blu-Ray	TBA

=== Compilation albums ===
List of albums, with selected chart positions and certifications
Title	Album details	Peak chart positions							Sales	Certifications (sales thresholds)
Title	Album details	UK	UK Indie	BEL	EU	IRL	JPN	SCO	Sales	Certifications (sales thresholds)
Picture of Perfect Youth	Released: 10 August 2004; Re-issued: 19 March 2007; Label: Echo (ECHCD43); Format: CD, LP	65	3	—	—	—	—	68		
The Singles	Released: 15 May 2006; Label: Echo (ECHCD69); Format: CD, CD/DVD, LP	1 (Note: Peak position on the revised Compilations Chart)	—	95	10	13	37	3	UK: 534,023	BPI: Platinum; IRMA: Gold
The Best of Feeder	Released: 29 September 2017; Label: BMG (BMGCAT100TCD); Format: 2×CD, 2×CD+EP, 3×LP+EP	10	2	—	—	—	—	8		BPI: Silver
Feel It Again	Released: 18 April 2026; Label: BMG (964217761); Format: LP	—	—	—	—	—	—	—		
"—" denotes releases that did not chart.

==== Japanese import compilations ====
Album	Year	Notes
High	1997	Features tracks from the Polythene singles and "Stereoworld" from Swim, previously not available on Japanese releases at the time.
Another Yesterday	2000	B-sides album, consisting of tracks from the Yesterday Went Too Soon singles.
Seven Days in the Sun	2001	Features tracks from the Echo Park and Polythene singles previously not available on Japanese releases at the time.
Best Days in the Sun	2001	Promotional album, comprising songs from Echo Park, Yesterday Went Too Soon, Polythene, and Swim; released in Japan only around the time of the release of Echo Park.
Find the Colour	2003	Features tracks from Swim EP and the Comfort in Sound singles. Also includes the single version of "Suffocate".
Feel it Again	2005	Features B-sides from the Pushing the Senses and Comfort in Sound singles, including two promo videos.
Seven Sleepers	2009	Features two new tracks, titled "Snowblind" and "Seven Sleepers". Only on this release at the time.

== Extended plays ==
Title	EP details	Peak chart positions		
Title	EP details	UK	UK Indie	SCO
Two Colours	Released: 25 September 1995; Format: 7", CD; Note: Debut release.	—	—	—
Swim	Released: 24 June 1996; Re-issued: 22 July 2001; Format: CD, cassette, LP; Note: Re-issued with extra tracks.	91	15	69
iTunes Live: London Festival '08 - EP	Released: 29 July 2008; Format: digital download; Note: Live performances from KOKO, London.	—	—	—
Napster Sessions EP	Released: 8 September 2008; Format: digital download; Note: Acoustic EP	—	—	—
"—" denotes releases that did not chart.

== Singles ==
=== As lead artist ===
Title	Year	Peak chart positions										Certifications	Album
Title	Year	UK	UK Indie	AUS	EU	IRL	SAF	SCO	US Alt	US Main.	US Rock	Certifications	Album
"Tangerine"	1997	60	—	—	—	—	—	79	—	—	—		Polythene
"Cement"	1997	53	—	—	—	—	—	67	—	31	23		Polythene
"Crash"	1997	48	—	—	—	—	—	55	—	—	—		Polythene
"High" (Note: "High" was originally released as a non-album single, but later on the re-issue of Polythene)	1997	24	6	—	77	—	—	25	24	36	27		Polythene
"Suffocate" (Note: Single release of "Suffocate" is a re-recorded full-band single version.)	1998	37	7	—	—	—	—	42	—	—	—		Polythene
"Day In Day Out"	1999	31	7	—	—	—	—	44	—	—	—		Yesterday Went Too Soon
"Insomnia"	1999	22	4	—	85	—	—	27	—	—	—		Yesterday Went Too Soon
"Yesterday Went Too Soon"	1999	20	2	—	—	—	—	18	—	—	—		Yesterday Went Too Soon
"Paperfaces"	1999	41	8	—	—	—	—	37	—	—	—		Yesterday Went Too Soon
"Buck Rogers"	2001	5	1	—	24	50	1	6	—	—	—	BPI: Platinum	Echo Park
"Seven Days in the Sun"	2001	14	2	—	54	—	31	12	—	—	—		Echo Park
"Turn"	2001	27	1	—	97	—	—	21	—	—	—		Echo Park
"Piece By Piece" (Note: "Piece By Piece was released in Germany, Belgium and France only.)	2001	—	—	—	—	—	—	—	—	—			Echo Park
"Just a Day"	2001	12	3	—	79	47	—	12	—	—	—	BPI: Gold	Picture of Perfect Youth
"Come Back Around"	2002	14	1	93	51	45	—	12	—	—	—		Comfort in Sound
"Just the Way I'm Feeling"	2003	10	5	—	34	—	—	10	—	—	—	BPI: Silver	Comfort in Sound
"Forget About Tomorrow"	2003	12	2	—	52	—	—	13	—	—	—		Comfort in Sound
"Find the Colour"	2003	24	4	—	—	—	—	23	—	—	—		Comfort in Sound
"Comfort in Sound"	2003	— (Note: "Comfort in Sound" did not enter the UK Singles Chart, but peaked at number 57 on the UK Airplay chart. The physical single was exclusively available on the 2003 Arena Tour.)	—	—	—	—	—	—	—	—	—		Comfort in Sound
"Tumble and Fall"	2005	5	1	—	20	26	—	7	—	—	—		Pushing the Senses
"Feeling a Moment"	2005	13	1	32	—	—	—	13	—	—	—	BPI: Silver	Pushing the Senses
"Pushing the Senses"	2005	30	6	—	—	—	—	31	—	—	—		Pushing the Senses
"Shatter / Tender"	2005	11	1	—	—	—	—	9	—	—	—		The Singles
"Lost and Found"	2006	12	—	—	—	—	—	9	—	—	—		The Singles
"Save Us"	2006	34	—	—	—	—	—	29	—	—	—		The Singles
"We Are the People"	2008	25	1	—	—	—	—	3	—	—	—		Silent Cry
"Tracing Lines" / "Silent Cry" (Note: "Tracing Lines" / "Silent Cry" were released as download only singles.)	2008	—	—	—	—	—	—	—	—	—	—		Silent Cry
"Call Out" (Note: "Call Out" was released as a download only single and then later as a limited edition 7".)	2010	— (Note: "Call Out" did not enter the UK Singles Chart, but peaked at number 28 on the UK Physical Singles Chart.)	—	—	—	—	—	—	—	—	—		Renegades
"Renegades"	2010	— (Note: "Renegades" did not enter the UK Singles Chart, but peaked at number five on the UK Physical Singles Chart.)	—	—	—	—	—	—	—	—	—		Renegades
"Down to the River / This Town"	2010	—	—	—	—	—	—	—	—	—	—		Renegades
"Side By Side" (Note: "Side By Side" was released as a download only charity single.)	2011	91	10	—	—	—	—	94	—	—	—		Non-album single
"Borders"	2012	52	—	—	—	—	—	51	—	—	—		Generation Freakshow
"Children of the Sun"	2012	— (Note: "Children of the Sun" did not enter the UK Singles Chart, but peaked at number three on the UK Physical Singles Chart.)	—	—	—	—	—	—	—	—	—		Generation Freakshow
"Idaho"	2012	— (Note: "Idaho" did not enter the UK Singles Chart, but peaked at number five on the UK Physical Singles Chart.)	—	—	—	—	—	—	—	—	—		Generation Freakshow
"Another Day on Earth" / "Paperweight"	2017	—	—	—	—	—	—	—	—	—	—		All Bright Electric
"Forget About Tomorrow" / "Just the Way I'm Feeling" (Note: "Forget About Tomorrow" / "Just the Way I'm Feeling" were released as a Record Store Day vinyl only single.)	2017	—	—	—	—	—	—	—	—	—	—		Comfort in Sound
"Arrow"	2017	—	—	—	—	—	—	—	—	—	—		Arrow
"Beautiful Boy (Darling Boy)"	2017	—	—	—	—	—	—	—	—	—	—		Non-album singles
"Sex Type Drug"	2018	—	—	—	—	—	—	—	—	—	—		Non-album singles
"San Diego"	2018	—	—	—	—	—	—	—	—	—	—		Non-album singles
"Fly"	2018	—	—	—	—	—	—	—	—	—	—		Non-album singles
"Bees"	2018	—	—	—	—	—	—	—	—	—	—		Arrow
"Bruised"	2018	—	—	—	—	—	—	—	—	—	—		Feel It Again
"Victoria"	2018	—	—	—	—	—	—	—	—	—	—		Non-album singles
"Purify"	2018	—	—	—	—	—	—	—	—	—	—		Non-album singles
"Seven Sleepers"	2018	—	—	—	—	—	—	—	—	—	—		Seven Sleepers
"Dove Grey Sands" (acoustic)	2018	—	—	—	—	—	—	—	—	—	—		Non-album single
"Waterfall"	2018	—	—	—	—	—	—	—	—	—	—		Polythene
"Snowblind"	2018	—	—	—	—	—	—	—	—	—	—		Seven Sleepers
"Fear of Flying"	2019	—	—	—	—	—	—	—	—	—	—		Tallulah
"Youth"	2019	—	—	—	—	—	—	—	—	—	—		Tallulah
"Daily Habit"	2019	—	—	—	—	—	—	—	—	—	—		Tallulah
"Criminal"	2019	—	—	—	—	—	—	—	—	—	—		Non-album single
"Feeling A Moment" / "Pushing The Senses" (Note: "Feeling A Moment" / "Pushing The Senses" were released as a Record Store Day vinyl only single.)	2020	— (Note: "Feeling A Moment" / "Pushing The Senses" did not enter the UK Singles Chart, but peaked at number 65 on the UK Single Sales Chart.)	—	—	—	—	—	—	—	—	—		Pushing the Senses
"Torpedo"	2021	—	—	—	—	—	—	—	—	—	—		Torpedo
"Magpie"	2021	—	—	—	—	—	—	—	—	—	—		Torpedo
"Wall of Silence"	2021	—	—	—	—	—	—	—	—	—	—		Torpedo
"The Healing"	2022	—	—	—	—	—	—	—	—	—	—		Torpedo
"Playing with Fire" / "Elf"	2023	—	—	—	—	—	—	—	—	—	—		Black / Red
"The Knock" / "Soldiers of Love"	2023	—	—	—	—	—	—	—	—	—	—		Black / Red
"Lost in the Wilderness"	2024	—	—	—	—	—	—	—	—	—	—		Black / Red
"Hey You"	2024	—	—	—	—	—	—	—	—	—	—		Black / Red
"Unconditional" / "Scream"	2024	— (Note: "Unconditional" / "Scream" did not enter the UK Singles Chart, but peaked at number 33 on the UK Single Sales Chart.)	—	—	—	—	—	—	—	—	—		Black / Red
"Here Comes The Hurricane" / "Submarine"	2024	— (Note: "Here Comes The Hurricane" / "Submarine" did not enter the UK Singles Chart, but peaked at number 13 on the UK Physical Singles Chart.)	—	—	—	—	—	—	—	—	—		Black / Red
" — " Denotes releases that did not chart, were not eligible or not released in that country.

=== As featured artist ===
Title	Year	Peak chart positions										Album
Title	Year	UK	AUS	BEL	EU	IRL	NLD	NZ	SCO	SWE	SWI	Album
"Ya Don't See the Signs" (Remix) (Mark B and Blade featuring Feeder)	2001	23	—	—	—	—	—	—	24	—	—	Non-album singles
"Do They Know It's Christmas?" (Note: "Do They Know It's Christmas?" was released as a charity single as part of the supergroup Band Aid 20 for famine relief in the Darfur region of Sudan.)	2004	1	9	7	1	1	5	2	1	2	7	Non-album singles
" — " Denotes that release did not chart or were not released in that country.

=== Promotional singles ===
Title	Year	Peak chart positions		Album
Title	Year	UK	US Rock	Album
"Stereo World"	1996	128	—	Swim (Note: "Stereo World" also appeared on Polythene.)
"Descend"	1997	—	35	Polythene
"Can't Dance to Disco" (Note: 300 copies of "Can't Dance to Disco" were pressed for student radio promotion. The track was later featured as a b-side on "Day in Day Out".)	1998	—	—	Picture of Perfect Youth
"Generation Freakshow" (Note: "Generation Freakshow" was not originally intended to be a promotional-only single. It was planned to be released on 12 March 2012 with "No Light" as its b-side, before being cancelled although promotional copies were already sent to radio stations.)	2012	—	—	Generation Freakshow
"Miss You"	2008	—	—	Silent Cry
"Universe of Life"	2016	—	—	All Bright Electric
"Eskimo"	2016	—	—	All Bright Electric
"Veins"	2017	—	—	Arrow
"Everybody Hurts"	2017	—	—	Non-album single
"Figure You Out"	2017	—	—	Arrow
"—" denotes releases that did not chart.

== Miscellaneous ==
Song	Year	Compilation	Comments
"Rush" (live)	1996	Home Truths	Later appeared as a B-side on "Cement". Only version of the song in existence.
"The Power of Love"	2002	1 Love	Cover of the Frankie Goes to Hollywood number one hit, recorded for a War Child charity album. Later appeared as a b-side on "Just the Way I'm Feeling" in 2003 and "Snowblind" in 2018, the Japanese Find the Colour mini-album and Picture of Perfect Youth.
"Clouds" (remix)	2003	Radio JXL: A Broadcast from the Computer Hell Cabin	JXL remix of the "Just the Way I'm Feeling" b-side "Broken" with a different backing track.
"Everybody Hurts"	2005	Download-only single	Cover of the R.E.M. hit, later appeared as a full-band version on "Shatter / Tender". Recorded in aid of War Child. Rereleased as a single in 2017.
"Beautiful Boy"	2006	Lennon: Covered Vol 1	Cover version of the John Lennon song from his 1980 album Double Fantasy, as part of a tribute album given away with Q Magazine. Rereleased as a single in 2017.
"Public Image"	2008	Independents Day: ID08	Cover of the 1978 debut single by PIL. Also available on Seven Sleepers.
"Fallen" (instrumental)	2010	Download-only track	Instrumental version of the "Call Out" b-side, which also appeared on the iTunes and Japanese versions of Renegades. Full version was also a free download in April 2010 for purchasers of the second Renegades EP, while the instrumental download was available to purchasers of the "Down to the River" / "This Town" single upon entering a code on Feederweb printed on the vinyl sleeve.
"No Light"	2012	Download-only track	Exclusive download for ticket holders of the band's Winter tour of 2012. Was scheduled to be a B-Side on the cancelled "Generation Freakshow" single. Later appeared on the 2017 Deluxe Edition version of the Generation Freakshow album.

== Music videos ==
Title	Year	Director
"Stereo World"	1996	Toby Duckett
"Tangerine"	1997	Toby Duckett
"Cement"	1997	John Klien
"Crash"	1997	Stuart A Gosling
"High"	1997	Stuart A Gosling
"Suffocate"	1998	Mark Nunneley
"High" (U.S. version)	1998	Lawrence Carroll
"Day in Day Out"	1999	Gavin Gordon Rogers
"Insomnia"	1999	Stuart A Gosling
"Yesterday Went Too Soon"	1999	Stuart A Gosling
"Paperfaces"	1999	Stuart A Gosling
"Buck Rogers"	2001	Markus Walter
"Seven Days in the Sun"	2001	Jake and Jim Goodman
"Turn"	2001	David Mould
"Piece By Piece" (original)	2001	Vincent Raj, David Vickery and Soichi Matsumoto
"Piece By Piece" (re-edit) (Note: The re-edit of "Piece by Piece", is a new version of "Suffocate", only with unused footage from the original shoot added and also sometimes replacing some original scenes.)	2001	Mark Nunneley
"Just a Day"	2001	David Mould
"Come Back Around"	2002	David Mould
"Just the Way I'm Feeling"	2003	Julian Gibbs
"Forget About Tomorrow"	2003	David Mould
"Find the Colour"	2003	Sam Brown
"Comfort in Sound"	2003	Mark Video
"Tumble and Fall"	2005	Scott Lyon
"Feeling a Moment"	2005	Jonas Odell
"Pushing the Senses"	2005	John Paveley
"Tender"	2005	Mark Video
"Shatter"	2005	Charlie Lightening
"Lost and Found"	2006	David Mould
"Save Us"	2006	Barnaby Roper
"We Are the People"	2008	David Mould
"Into the Blue"	2008	Mark Video
"Tracing Lines"	2008	El Skid
"Call Out"	2010	Scott Peters
"Renegades"	2010	Nils Leonard
"Side By Side"	2011	None (Note: The video for "Side By Side" is a compilation of video clips from various Japanese news media agencies of the destruction caused by the 2011 Tsunami, and as such, has no single director.)
"Borders"	2012	MM
"Children of the Sun"	2012	Joe Connor
"Idaho"	2012	Joseph "Joe" Connor
"Universe of Life"	2016	Mikey Eaton
"Eskimo"	2016	Sitcom Soldiers
"Another Day on Earth"	2017	Sitcom Soldiers
"Paperweight"	2017	Sitcom Soldiers
"Veins"	2017	Sitcom Soldiers
"Figure You Out"	2017	Sitcom Soldiers
"Bees" (Alt. Version)	2018	Sitcom Soldiers
"Fear of Flying"	2019	Sitcom Soldiers
"Youth"	2019	Sitcom Soldiers
"Daily Habit"	2019	Sitcom Soldiers
"Blue Sky Blue"	2019	Sitcom Soldiers
"Just a Day II" (Note: "Just a Day II", is a remake of the original video, to raise awareness of the front line workers during the COVID-19 pandemic. Two people from the original video make a second appearance.)	2020	Mikey Eaton
