= The Best of Feeder / Arrow =

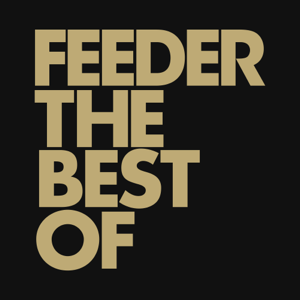
- Standard edition cover. Deluxe cover has gray text

Greatest hits album by Feeder
- Released: 29 September 2017
- Recorded: 1996–2017
- Label: BMG

Feeder chronology
All Bright Electric (2016)	The Best of Feeder / Arrow (2017)	Tallulah (2019)

Singles from The Best of Feeder / Arrow
- 1. "Veins" Released: 14 August 2017; 2. "Arrow" Released: 18 September 2017; 3. "Figure You Out" Released: 15 December 2017; 4. "Bees" Released: 23 March 2018

The Best of Feeder is Feeder's third UK compilation album, following Picture of Perfect Youth released in 2004 and The Singles released in 2006. The deluxe edition was released with a nine-track album titled Arrow.

In 2024 the album was certified silver in the United Kingdom for 60,000 combined pure sales and streams, with streaming making up at least between 40,000 and 50,000 of the total. This only takes into account the 12 most streamed tracks on the standard release of the album on a week-by-week basis, added onto the total pure sales. It became the band's first album to receive a sales award during the streaming era, a rarity for many rock bands.

== Track listing ==
The album has 3 editions: a 2-CD 'standard' edition and two 'deluxe' editions available on 3 CDs and 4 LPs. Each edition contains a selection of 42 Feeder singles, plus some or all of the 9 tracks that make up Arrow. The only single not included on any edition is "This Town", furthermore, the album version of "Paperfaces" is used instead of the single version. “Walk Away”, which is on the nine track mini album, was first performed in 2010 on a Japanese live radio session.

- The 2-CD edition has 41 tracks. It intersperses 37 singles – it excludes "Tangerine", "Miss You", "Call Out", "Side by Side" and "Tracing Lines" – with 4 tracks from Arrow.
- The 3-CD edition has 50 tracks. The first 2 discs contain 41 singles – "Call Out" is excluded. The third disc contains Arrow in full.
- The 4-LP edition has 46 tracks. The first 3 LPs contain 37 singles – a different selection to the 2-CD edition, excluding "Paperfaces", "Save Us", "Miss You", "Side by Side" and "Tracing Lines". The fourth LP contains Arrow in full.

=== 2-CD standard edition ===
All tracks are written by Grant Nicholas

Disc one
No.	Title	Original album	Length
1.	"Feeling a Moment"	Pushing the Senses (2005)
2.	"Come Back Around"	Comfort in Sound (2002)
3.	"Eskimo"	All Bright Electric (2016)
4.	"Just the Way I'm Feeling"	Comfort in Sound
5.	"Forget About Tomorrow"	Comfort in Sound
6.	"Just a Day"	Non-album single (2001)
7.	"Figure You Out"	New song	3:46
8.	"Insomnia"	Yesterday Went Too Soon (1999)
9.	"Comfort in Sound" (Spike Mix)	Original version on Comfort in Sound
10.	"High"	Polythene (re-issue, 1997)
11.	"Buck Rogers"	Echo Park (2001)
12.	"Seven Days in the Sun"	Echo Park
13.	"Turn"	Echo Park
14.	"Renegades"	Renegades (2010)
15.	"Lost & Found"	The Singles (2006)
16.	"Tender"	Pushing the Senses
17.	"Yesterday Went Too Soon"	Yesterday Went Too Soon
18.	"Pushing the Senses"	Pushing the Senses
19.	"Shatter"	Non-album single (2005)
20.	"Veins"	New song	3:49
21.	"Another Day on Earth"	All Bright Electric

Disc two
No.	Title	Original album	Length
1.	"We Are the People"	Silent Cry (2008)
2.	"Universe of Life"	All Bright Electric
3.	"Idaho"	Generation Freakshow (2012)
4.	"Tumble and Fall"	Pushing the Senses
5.	"Walk Away"	New song
6.	"Crash"	Polythene
7.	"Silent Cry"	Silent Cry
8.	"Find the Colour"	Comfort in Sound
9.	"Day In Day Out"	Yesterday Went Too Soon
10.	"Down to the River"	Renegades
11.	"Paperweight"	All Bright Electric
12.	"Cement"	Polythene
13.	"Suffocate"	Non-album single (1998)
14.	"Borders"	Generation Freakshow
15.	"Bees"	New song
16.	"Paperfaces"	Yesterday Went Too Soon
17.	"Save Us"	The Singles
18.	"Stereo World"	Swim (1996)/Polythene
19.	"Piece by Piece"	Echo Park
20.	"Children of the Sun"	Generation Freakshow

=== 3-CD deluxe edition ===
All tracks are written by Grant Nicholas

Disc one
No.	Title	Original album	Length
1.	"Feeling a Moment"	Pushing the Senses	4:09
2.	"Come Back Around"	Comfort in Sound	3:13
3.	"Eskimo"	All Bright Electric	3:49
4.	"Just the Way I'm Feeling"	Comfort in Sound	4:23
5.	"Forget About Tomorrow"	Comfort in Sound	3:50
6.	"Just a Day"	Non-album single (2001)	4:05
7.	"Insomnia"	Yesterday Went Too Soon	2:53
8.	"Comfort in Sound" (Spike Mix)	Original version on Comfort in Sound	3:39
9.	"High"	Polythene (re-issue)	4:33
10.	"Buck Rogers"	Echo Park	3:14
11.	"Pushing the Senses" (Single mix)	Original version on Pushing the Senses	3:28
12.	"Turn"	Echo Park	4:32
13.	"Renegades"	Renegades	3:39
14.	"Lost & Found"	The Singles	2:58
15.	"Tender"	Pushing the Senses	4:17
16.	"Yesterday Went Too Soon"	Yesterday Went Too Soon	4:20
17.	"Shatter" (Single mix)	Non-album single (2005)	2:58
18.	"Borders"	Generation Freakshow	3:30
19.	"Seven Days in the Sun"	Echo Park	3:40
20.	"Piece by Piece"	Echo Park	3:51
21.	"Another Day on Earth"	All Bright Electric	3:54

Disc two
No.	Title	Original album	Length
1.	"We Are the People"	Silent Cry	4:47
2.	"Universe of Life"	All Bright Electric	3:43
3.	"Idaho"	Generation Freakshow	3:29
4.	"Tumble and Fall"	Pushing the Senses	4:22
5.	"Crash"	Polythene	4:09
6.	"Silent Cry"	Silent Cry	3:28
7.	"Find the Colour"	Comfort in Sound	3:56
8.	"Day In Day Out"	Yesterday Went Too Soon	3:39
9.	"Down to the River"	Renegades	5:23
10.	"Paperweight"	All Bright Electric	3:19
11.	"Tangerine"	Polythene	3:53
12.	"Cement"	Polythene	3:18
13.	"Suffocate" (Single version)	Non-album single (1998)	4:44
14.	"Side by Side"	Non-album single (2011)	3:46
15.	"Stereo World"	Swim/Polythene	3:29
16.	"Paperfaces" (Album version)	Yesterday Went Too Soon	4:28
17.	"Save Us"	The Singles	3:53
18.	"Tracing Lines"	Silent Cry	3:49
19.	"Miss You"	Silent Cry	3:00
20.	"Children of the Sun"	Generation Freakshow	4:20

Disc three – Arrow
No.	Title	Length
1.	"Figure You Out"	3:46
2.	"Walk Away"	3:07
3.	"Bees"	3:36
4.	"Veins"	3:49
5.	"Sound of Birds"	3:31
6.	"Arrow"	3:29
7.	"Dive"	3:37
8.	"Sirens"	3:42
9.	"Landslide"	3:12

=== 4-LP deluxe edition ===
All tracks are written by Grant Nicholas

Side A
No.	Title	Original album	Length
1.	"Feeling a Moment"	Pushing the Senses
2.	"Come Back Around"	Comfort in Sound
3.	"Eskimo"	All Bright Electric
4.	"Just the Way I'm Feeling"	Comfort in Sound
5.	"Forget About Tomorrow"	Comfort in Sound
6.	"Just a Day"	Non-album single (2001)

Side B
No.	Title	Original album	Length
1.	"Comfort in Sound" (Spike mix)	Original version on Comfort in Sound
2.	"High"	Polythene
3.	"Buck Rogers"	Echo Park
4.	"Insomnia"	Yesterday Went Too Soon
5.	"Lost & Found"	The Singles
6.	"Shatter"	Non-album single (2005)
7.	"Piece by Piece"	Echo Park

Side C
No.	Title	Original album	Length
1.	"Renegades"	Renegades
2.	"Turn"	Echo Park
3.	"Pushing the Senses"	Pushing the Senses
4.	"Tender"	Pushing the Senses
5.	"Find the Colour"	Comfort in Sound
6.	"Another Day on Earth"	All Bright Electric

Side D
No.	Title	Original album	Length
1.	"Yesterday Went Too Soon"	Yesterday Went Too Soon
2.	"Borders"	Generation Freakshow
3.	"Seven Days in the Sun"	Echo Park
4.	"Suffocate"	Non-album single (1998)
5.	"Call Out"	Renegades
6.	"Children of the Sun"	Generation Freakshow

Side E
No.	Title	Original album	Length
1.	"We Are the People"	Silent Cry
2.	"Universe of Life"	All Bright Electric
3.	"Idaho"	Generation Freakshow
4.	"Stereo World"	Swim/Polythene
5.	"Day in Day Out"	Yesterday Went Too Soon
6.	"Tumble and Fall"	Pushing the Senses

Side F
No.	Title	Original album	Length
1.	"Down to the River"	Renegades
2.	"Paperweight"	All Bright Electric
3.	"Cement"	Polythene
4.	"Crash"	Polythene
5.	"Tangerine"	Polythene
6.	"Silent Cry"	Silent Cry

Side G – Arrow
No.	Title	Length
1.	"Figure You Out"	3:46
2.	"Walk Away"
3.	"Bees"
4.	"Veins"
5.	"Sound of Birds"

Side H – Arrow
No.	Title	Length
1.	"Arrow"
2.	"Dive"
3.	"Sirens"
4.	"Landslide"

== Charts ==
Chart performance for The Best of Feeder
Chart (2017)	Peak position
Scottish Albums (OCC)	8
UK Albums (OCC)	10

== Certifications ==
Region	Certification	Certified units/sales
United Kingdom (BPI)	Silver	60,000^{‡}
^{‡} Sales+streaming figures based on certification alone.
