= Polythene: The Video Singles =

1998 VHS compilation by Feeder

Video by Feeder
- Released: April 1998
- Label: Echo

Polythene: The Video Singles is an extremely rare VHS compilation tape, released by the British rock band Feeder. It was initially only available at the merchandise stalls on their UK Suffocate Tour which ran during April–May 1998. The band returned from the United States after supporting Everclear before taking on the tour, in which this time Everclear were in the supporting position. The tour was originally planned to end on the 31 April 1998, but demand seen them add a second date at the now defunct London Astoria, which meant the tour ended on 1 May 1998.

== Content ==
The video compilation features all of Feeder's music videos up to the present at the time, all of which were single releases from their 1997 debut album Polythene, with "Suffocate" being re-recorded. Before each video, a member of the band or their US touring crew such as their bus driver would introduce the next video. These range from Jon Lee driving an RV while listening to the radio (the viewer only sees the road he is driving on, through the driver's window), before stopping on a layby to introduce "Stereo World", Taka Hirose playing pool before introducing "Tangerine", a member of the bands catering staff introducing "Cement" but forgetting the name of the song, their bus driver introducing "Crash", Grant Nicholas on crutches introducing "High" and another member of the touring staff introducing "Suffocate".

When the last video finishes, a short piece of footage with Grant Nicholas and Taka Hirose is shown outside a gig venue on their US tour, informing the viewers that they're off on their next date of the tour and also hoping that they enjoyed the videos, alongside telling them that they'll be back in the UK soon. A caption reading "Where is Jon Lee?" is displayed at the bottom of the screen before the frame freezes, showing them both waving and "Polythene Girl" being played over the end credits. Throughout the video, captions are displayed during the introductions giving extra information on the video being mentioned.

== Production and availability ==
The segments between the videos were the idea of an employee at Echo, with Feeder's manager Matt Page doing the filming and it was during the filming for the first part of the footage that Grant slipped over and broke his ankle, hence the crutches later on in the video (and indeed for the rest of the tour). During the filming of the first shot where Grant runs up to the camera, he broke his leg, just after the director shouted "cut!".

The video tape was deleted and pressed to a limited run for the whole tour, with a small number left over which were sold by their official website. Copies rarely appear on eBay with the last time being in May 2005, it sold for £30.49 compared to its original price of 12 pounds, but if the item is to appear again it would possibly go for a much higher price.
