= Renegades =

Renegades or The Renegades may refer to:

== Books ==
- The Renegades by T. Jefferson Parker
- Renegades (novel), a 2017 novel by Marissa Meyer

== Film and television ==
- Renegades (1930 film), starring Myrna Loy
- Renegades (1946 film), starring Evelyn Keyes
- Renegades (1989 film), starring Kiefer Sutherland and Lou Diamond Phillips
- Renegades (2017 film), starring Sullivan Stapleton and J.K. Simmons
- Renegades (2022 film), starring Nick Moran
- G.I. Joe: Renegades, 2010–2011 G.I. Joe animated series
- Renegades (Gobots), the villains in the Gobots fiction and toy series
- The Renegades (TV series), 1983 American television series
- Star Trek: Renegades (2015), Star Trek fan film pilot

== Music ==
- The Renegades (band), a 1960s British-Finnish rock band headed by Kim Brown
- Renegades (band), a side-project of the band Feeder

=== Albums ===
- Renegades (Rage Against the Machine album), 2000
- Renegades, a 1984 album by Brass Construction
- Renegades (Nicole Mitchell album), 2009
- Renegades (Feeder album), 2010
- Renegades (Equilibrium album), 2019
- Renegades, a 2020 album by L.A. Guns

=== Songs ===
- "Renegades" (Feeder song), 2010
- "Renegades" (X Ambassadors song), 2015
- "Renegades" (One Ok Rock song), 2021

=== Podcasts ===
- Renegades: Born in the USA, 2021 podcast hosted by Barack Obama and Bruce Springsteen

== Sports teams ==
- Renegades (esports), an American esports team
- Dallas Renegades (formerly the Arlington Renegades), an American football team
- Bakersfield College Renegades, an American sports team
- Berkshire Renegades (formerly the Reading Renegades), a British American football team
- Boston Renegades, an American women's soccer team
- Boston Renegades (WFA), an American women's tackle football team
- Hudson Valley Renegades, an American minor league baseball team
- Melbourne Renegades, an Australian cricket team in Big Bash League
- Mt Riv Renegades, an Australian basketball team
- Orlando Renegades, a 1985 United States Football League team
- Ottawa Renegades, a Canadian Football League team
- Richmond Renegades (1990–2003), an American ice hockey team
- Richmond Renegades (SPHL) (2006-2009), an American ice hockey team
- Rome Renegades, an American indoor football team (American football)
- Zurich Renegades, a Swiss American football team

== Other ==
- Renegade Twins, professional wrestling tag-team
- Renegades (Wraith: The Oblivion), a 1998 supplement for the role-playing game Wraith: The Oblivion

== See also ==
- Renegade (disambiguation)
