= Silent Cry (disambiguation) =

Silent Cry is a 2008 album by Feeder, or the title song.

Silent Cry or Silent Cries may also refer to:

== Books ==
- The Silent Cry, a 1967 Japanese novel by Kenzaburō Ōe
- The Silent Cry, novel by Cathy Glass (author)
- The Silent Cry, novel by Anne Perry
- Silent Cry, 2004 play by Madani Younis from Asian Theatre School/Red Ladder Theatre Company

== Film and TV ==
- The Silent Cry, a 1977 film directed by Stephen Dwoskin
- Silent Cry (film), a 2003 UK thriller film
- Silent Cries, a television film about female POWs in Singapore in 1941
- The Silent Cry, an episode of Mannix
- A Silent Cry, an episode of Walker, Texas Ranger
- Silent Cries, a dance video by choreographer Jiří Kylián

== Music ==
- Silent Cry (album), Feeder, 2008
- "Silent Cry" (song), a song by Feeder, 2008
- "Silent Cry" (Stray Kids song), a song by Stray Kids from Noeasy, 2021
- "Silent Cry", a song by Dominick Farinacci
- "Silent Cries", a song by Fates Warning from No Exit, 1988
