= Renegade =

Renegade or The Renegade may refer to:

== Aircraft ==
- Lake Renegade, an American amphibious aircraft design
- Murphy Renegade, a Canadian ultralight biplane design
- Southern Aeronautical Renegade, an American racing aircraft design

== Games ==
- Command & Conquer: Renegade, a 2002 first-person shooter video game
- Renegade (video game), a 1986 video game
- Renegade Legion, a 1990 board game series
  - Renegade: The Battle for Jacob's Star, a video game based on Renegade Legion
- Renegade Software, a games publisher of the 1990s
- Jak II: Renegade, the second game in the Jak and Daxter series
- Renegade points, a type of scoring/level system in the game series Mass Effect

== Literature ==
- Renegade, a 1926 novel by Arthur O. Friel
- Renegade, a 1953 novel by Bret Harding
- Renegade, a 1979 novel by Lou Cameron, written as Ramsay Thorne
- Renegade, a 1989 novel by Cordell Scotten in the Isaac Asimov's Robots and Aliens series
- Renegade, a 1991 Star Trek novel by Gene DeWeese
- Renegade, a 2001 novel by Michael Carroll
- The Renegade, a 1917 novel by John Finnemore
- The Renegade (French: Le Renégat), a 1929 novel by André Armandy
- The Renegade, a 1942 novel by L. L. Foreman, basis for the 1952 film The Savage
- "The Renegade" (short story), a 1957 short story by Albert Camus
- The Renegade, a 1969 novel by Walt Coburn
- The Renegade, a 1980 novel by Donald Clayton Porter
- The Renegade, a 1995 novel by Lauran Paine
- "The Renegade" (poem), a poem by David Diop

== Music ==
- Renegade (band), an American rock band, also referred to throughout Latin America as Los Renegados

=== Albums ===
- Renegade (single album) or the title song, by Lucas, 2024
- Renegade (Charlie Daniels album) or the title song, 1991
- Renegade (HammerFall album) or the title song (see below), 2000
- Renegade (Thin Lizzy album) or the title song, 1981
- Renegade, by Dylan LeBlanc, 2019
- Renegade, an EP by Alexandra Burke, 2015
- Renegade, an EP by Cimorelli, 2014

=== Songs ===
- "Renegade" (ATB song), 2007
- "Renegade" (Big Red Machine song), 2021
- "Renegade" (Daughtry song), 2011
- "Renegade" (HammerFall song), 2000
- "Renegade" (Jay-Z song), 2001
- "Renegade" (Paramore song), 2011
- "Renegade" (Styx song), 1979
- "Lottery (Renegade)", by K Camp, 2019
- "Renegade", by Axwell & Ingrosso from More Than You Know, 2017
- "Renegade", by Bushido, 2019
- "Renegade", by Carpark North from Phoenix, 2014
- "Renegade", by Eva Simons, 2012
- "Renegade", by Hed PE from New World Orphans, 2009
- "Renegade", by Hollywood Undead from Five, 2017
- "Renegade", by Kavinsky from Reborn, 2022
- "Renegade", by Kings of Convenience from Declaration of Dependence, 2009
- "Renegade", by Manafest from The Chase, 2010
- "Renegade", by the Paper Kites from Twelvefour, 2015
- "Renegade", by the Qemists from Spirit in the System, 2010
- "Renegade", by Running Wild from Death or Glory, 1989
- "Renegade", by Steppenwolf from Steppenwolf 7, 1970
- "Renegade", by War of Ages from Supreme Chaos, 2014
- "Renegade", by Warren Zevon from Mr. Bad Example, 1991
- "Renegade", by Wynter Gordon from With the Music I Die, 2011
- "The Renegade", by the Pozo-Seco Singers, 1968
- "Renegade (We Never Run)", by Raja Kumari and Stefflon Don from Arcane League of Legends: Season 2, 2024

== People ==
- Ray Keith, also known as Renegade, jungle/drum-and-bass DJ and producer
- Barack Obama, whose Secret Service code name is "Renegade"
- The Renegade (wrestler), American professional wrestler
- Renegade Knucks, the New Yoke City counterpart of Knuckles from Sonic Prime

== Television and film ==
- The Renegade (1948 film), a French drama film
- The Renegade (1951 film), a Cuban drama film
- Renegade (TV series), 1992–1997 TV series produced by Stephen J. Cannell and starring Lorenzo Lamas
- Blueberry (film), a 2004 French movie released in the US as Renegade

== Other ==
- The Dell XPS 600 Renegade, a model in the Dell XPS line of computers
- Jeep Renegade (disambiguation), a nameplate used in several models sold by Jeep
- Renegade (BBS), a bulletin board system written for IBM PC-compatible computers running MS-DOS
- Renegade (roller coaster), a wooden roller coaster at Valleyfair in Shakopee, Minnesota
- Renegade show, a frequent event at juggling conventions
- Renegade (betrayer), a person who has betrayed and run away from his or her own kind
- Renegade, the name used for Reversi in Clubhouse Games: 51 Worldwide Classics
- Renegade Animation, an American animation studio located in Glendale, California
- Renegade (horse), an American thoroughbred race horse

== See also ==
- Renegades (disambiguation)
