= Bubblehead =

Bubblehead may refer to:

- US military slang for a submariner
- Booey Bubblehead is a character in the cartoon series Galaxy High
- "Bubblehead", a hidden track from Feeder's album Yesterday Went Too Soon
- "Bubble Heads", an episode of the animated television series O'Grady
- "The Bubbleheads", a four part episode of the 1964 cartoon series Underdog_(TV_series)

== See also ==
- Bobblehead
