= Seven Sleepers (EP) =

EP by Feeder
- Released: 18 February 2009
- Recorded: 2007–2008
- Genre: Alternative rock
- Length: 20:15
- Label: Victor
- Producer: Feeder

Feeder chronology
Silent Cry (2008)	Seven Sleepers (2009)	Renegades (2010)

Seven Sleepers is a Japan-only EP by the British rock band Feeder. It was the first ever release by the band after their label Echo, was downstreamed into a copyrights exploitation company and as a result announced that they would not be releasing any new records or signing any new artists. This meant that Feeder were without a UK record label and that for the duration of being unsigned in the UK, they could not release any material in their home country.

Before the band's 2008 winter tour, there were plans to release a tour-only EP which would be available at merchandise stalls at the venues the band would be playing. In 2007, the band entered the Crypt, a studio in northern London, to record their sixth studio album, Silent Cry; at the same time, Echo were up for sale and were in financial trouble, and would not release the album until a buyer was found. With EMI offering a price that was too low for the label, and many delays in the album already having been caused, Echo decided to release the album with hopes that it would bring the label back afloat, after the commercial success achieved with Feeder's previous release The Singles. However, with BBC Radio 1 not playing its first single "We Are the People" and a relatively low chart placing for the single at #25, alongside the album having very little promotion due to Echo's financial worries, the album quickly dropped out of the top 75 weekly album listing, despite an unexpected chart entry at #8 due to a lack of commercial pre-release awareness.

Amongst the recordings for the album were a series of tracks that did not make the final cut, and were used as b-sides for "We Are the People" and other singles that were due to be released. However, due to the album's underwhelming sales, no more singles containing those tracks were released, meaning that the planned b-sides were locked in the vaults. Later on in the year, the band planned to self-release a tour EP, and included a few new songs for it, with those being "Seven Sleepers" and "Snowblind", meaning that they would be exclusive to the release. However, due to contract laws meaning that they were still under Echo, this never materialised.

The following year, the band were still signed to their Japanese label Victor, meaning that they could still release the tracks over there anyway. Echo also decided not to claim ownership of the new tracks, with only Victor doing so. As a result, this became Feeder's first ever release not to have any release involvement from the label, with no Echo imprint appearing on the inlay and the obi strip. The EP was then completed, with a series of already released tracks making the total up to six.

== Track listing ==
1. "Seven Sleepers" – 3:44
2. "Snowblind" – 3:22
3. "Public Image" – 3:05
4. "Tracing Lines (single edit)" – 3:34
5. "We Are the People (acoustic version)" – 3:55
6. "Somewhere to Call Your Own" – 2:32
