= Cathy Glass =

Cathy Glass may refer to:

- Katherine Glass, American actress
- Cathy Glass (author), British writer
