= Figure You Out =

Figure You Out may refer to:

- "Figure You Out", a song by Feeder from the album The Best of Feeder / Arrow
- "Figure You Out", a song by Felix Jaehn from the album I (Felix Jaehn album)
- "Figure You Out", a song by Rodney Atkins from the album Caught Up in the Country

== See also ==
- Figured You Out, a song by Nickelback
