= Down to the River / This Town =

Single by Feeder

from the album Renegades
- Released: 6 December 2010
- Recorded: 2010
- Genre: Alternative rock
- Length: Down to the River: 4:00; This Town: 2:57
- Label: Big Teeth Music
- Songwriter: Grant Nicholas (both songs)
- Producer: Grant Nicholas

Feeder singles chronology
"Renegades" (2010)	"Down to the River / This Town" (2010)	"Side By Side" (2011)

"Down to the River / This Town" are two songs on a double A-sided single by Feeder, released as the group's third and final single from their seventh album Renegades in 2010, while being their 31st single overall and their third double A-sided single after the 2008 release of "Tracing Lines / Silent Cry". Both tracks like the majority of the Renegades album, started off life as tracks first performed live under their Renegades side-project name, but were both only released commercially as Feeder tracks.

"Down to the River" is the longest track on the Renegades album, running at 5 minutes and 23 seconds being edited down to 4 minutes for single release, while "This Town" has a running time of 2 minutes and 57 seconds. When "Down to the River" was first played live, setlists would list the song as "Down to the River" or simply "River" with Grant Nicholas introducing the song as "Down By the River". This confusion was further lengthened when the standard edition of Renegades listed the track as "Down By the River", while the special edition listed it as "Down to the River". Grant Nicholas later confirmed "Down to the River" as the correct title.

This is also the first single to be released by the band to include an A-side track recorded not with their main drummer, as "Down to the River" features former Mexicolas drummer Tim Trotter while "This Town" features their then regular drummer Karl Brazil. Tim played drums on two of the album's tracks, with the other being "White Lines". On "Call Out", Trotter drums on the track "Fallen", which was however a B-side on that single.

The single has no new tracks, meaning "Sending Out Waves" is the only new track to be released exclusively on any of the album's singles, as "Fallen", the b-side to "Call Out", was at first a free download to anybody who owned a copy of the Renegades second EP and also appears on the iTunes and Japanese versions of the album. Although there are indeed no new tracks on the vinyl itself, the vinyl sleeve was printed with a code, that if entered on a special section of the Feederweb website, allowed the user to download an instrumental version of "Fallen". This version unlike the one on the instrumentals promo CD, has no skips in it and have been corrected especially for this download release. The track was used as an instrumental during the 2010-2011 edition of Match of the Day, while the Premier League table was shown. The download was released to tie in with this. "Down to the River/This Town", could be seen as Feeder's most low-key single release as although promo CDs were made for airplay, the single included no new material making it more of a single for collectors, while there was no music video produced for the single, making it the first Feeder single release not to include one. The main reason for this was that the band were on tour before the single was released, therefore taking away their time to make one.

== Track listing ==
=== 7" vinyl ===
- "Down to the River" (radio edit) - 4:00
- "This Town" - 2:57
