= Silent Cry =

Studio album by Feeder
- Released: 16 June 2008
- Recorded: 2007–2008 at the Crypt Studios in London, England
- Genres: Alternative rock, post-grunge, power pop
- Length: 46:02 (13-track version)
- Label: Echo
- Producers: Grant Nicholas, Matt Sime

Feeder chronology
The Singles (2006)	Silent Cry (2008)	iTunes Live: London Festival '08 (2008)

Singles from Silent Cry
- 1. "We Are the People" Released: 9 June 2008; 2. "Tracing Lines / Silent Cry" Released: 25 August 2008

Silent Cry is the sixth studio album by Welsh rock band Feeder. It was released by Echo, on 16 June 2008, on CD, deluxe CD, vinyl, and digital download. It was the follow-up to 2005's Pushing the Senses and in terms of all albums, the highly successful singles album in 2006. The first single, "We Are the People", preceded the album, being released on 9 June. It was their last album to feature Mark Richardson on Drums before departing in 2009.

The album was recorded at the Crypt Studios in North London, England, with the help of long-time friend of the band Matt Sime. Like their 1999 album Yesterday Went Too Soon, the album was self-produced. Three tracks ("We Are the People", "Itsumo" and "Fires") feature backing vocals by Sarah Clark- bassist and singer with Bang Bangs, a project signed to Sime's publishing company Black Circle.

Despite the problems that occurred behind the scenes at the band's then record label Echo, which resulted in their dissolution, the album managed to debut at #8 in the official UK Albums Chart, but still became their first ever album not to go silver. The song "Miss You" is also credited to being featured on the video game Midnight Club: Los Angeles.

The album's second and final single, "Tracing Lines / Silent Cry", was released on 25 August as a download only, but failed to chart. It was their last release on Echo after 14 years.

== Reception and problems during album campaign ==
Professional ratings
Aggregate scores
Source	Rating
Metacritic	56/100
Review scores
Source	Rating
The Mirror	3/5 stars
Drowned in Sound	7/10
The Guardian	3/5 stars
Kerrang!	3/5 stars
NME	7/10
Rock Louder	4/5 stars

The album was given a mixed response critically, only scoring a 56/100 on the reviews aggregator Metacritic, indicating "average or mixed reviews". Commercially the album also had a poor response in terms of overall sales, failing to gain a silver sales certification. However, in terms of peak chart position, the album was a modest success, charting in the UK Albums Chart at a respectable #8, despite first single "We Are the People" not receiving any major mainstream airplay from stations such as BBC Radio 1, making it the first Feeder single since 1997's "Crash" not to be playlisted by the station. (The single itself charted at #25)

In the second week, the album then dropped to #30 and then #60 before leaving the top 75. This meant that the album became their lowest-selling at the time. Frontman Grant Nicholas says it is an album he's "very proud of", despite the underwhelming exposure by the media. Some fans have suggested Echo's financial position at the time of release which was caused by the 2007 global recession, had made the album very hard to promote while the delays in release, resulting from the lack of interest from a buyer of the label, have been contributing factors towards holding the album back. BBC Radio 1 wrote off the album from the start, even before being offered "We Are the People" as a radio play first single proper from the album (ignoring "Miss You" which was a free download). The band could not release the album on a different label, unless they paid an amount of money to be released, due to law stating that the band had to honour the six studio albums contract. In an October 2010 interview with Culture Deluxe, Nicholas cited that there were "Deals on the table, but they wouldn't let it go".

"Tracing Lines" was originally planned to be the next single as a standalone package, but due to radio informing the label that the album's title track "Silent Cry" was a track they wanted to play, the single was extended into a double A-sided release and was a download only single. It failed to chart after receiving no airplay on mainstream radio, and it is believed that if a third single was released, it would have been "Itsumo" due to Feederweb, the band's official website releasing a T-shirt based on the song.

A fourth single was then planned to be "Sonorous", with the creators of the best three entries of a video design competition for "Miss You", being invited to appear in the video for that single. The single release never came to happen due to the underwhelming commercial response of the album and the label being downsized to a copyrights exploitation company. The winning entry of the aforementioned competition, would have been included on a future DVD single. As Echo no longer exist as a label, it is impossible this will ever happen.

The album's commercial performance also seen the head of the album's promotion project, fired by the label. In the aftermath of these events, the band have refused to play any material from the album at live shows, with Grant Nicholas citing that it "Would bring back unpleasant memories". At the band's 2018 tour celebrating 21 years of releasing music, an acoustic version of the title track would be performed during the show's encore, making it the first time in nine years any material from the album would be performed. Many fans acknowledged Grant playing the song after the shows.

Despite the album's underwhelming sales (less than 50,000 units), the band once again played the main stage of the Reading and Leeds festivals (this time in their highest ever position on the line-up), before taking on their biggest UK tour consisting of 29 different dates. The tour saw the band play at the Brixton Academy after a three-year pause, alongside the London Astoria for the last ever time as well as being their last show there as an Echo Label artist. The venue was later torn down the following year. The tour and indeed the campaign for the album ended on 2 December 2008 at the Portsmouth Pyramids Centre.

The following year Feeder released the Seven Sleepers EP, on their Japanese label Victor. It contained two new tracks titled "Seven Sleepers" and "Snowblind", which the band recorded for a self-released tour-only EP. As the band were still under contract with Echo at the time, the release did not occur but were instead released as part of the import EP.

"Miss You"
"Miss You" was the first single from this album, and depicts the return to grunge-punk previously seen in Polythene.

Over the next fourteen years, the band’s opinion on its commercial success may have differed. When the band got their tenth U.K. Top 10 album in 2022, the band proclaimed this their landmark achievement. As this album was one of those ten, their opinions on its commercial performance may have changed over the years, looking more towards its highest chart placing instead of its overall performance, especially since 2020 it’s been commonplace for an album to enter at its highest chart placing on its release week (especially Top 10 albums and No.1’s), before leaving the Top 100 altogether in its second.

In podcasts that have followed in recent years, Nicholas has often cited tracks from the album as the best ones he's written, with "Fires" often getting a mention.

== Track listing ==
All tracks are written by Grant Nicholas.

No.	Title	Length
1.	"We Are the People"	4:41
2.	"Itsumo"	4:17
3.	"Miss You"	2:59
4.	"Tracing Lines"	3:47
5.	"Silent Cry"	3:25
6.	"Fires"	3:59
7.	"Heads Held High"	4:04
8.	"8.18"	3:45
9.	"Who's the Enemy"	3:18
10.	"Space"	0:34
11.	"Into the Blue"	2:36
12.	"Guided By a Voice"	3:50
13.	"Sonorous"	4:39

Deluxe and Japanese release bonus tracks
No.	Title	Length
14.	"Yeah Yeah"	3:17
15.	"Every Minute"	2:24
16.	"Calling Out for Days" (Japan only)	3:17

== Charts ==
Chart (2008)	Peak position
European Top 100 Albums	29
Irish Albums Chart	82
Japanese Albums Chart	53
UK Albums Chart	8

== Personnel ==
Feeder

- Grant Nicholas - vocals, guitars, keyboards, production, mixing on "Heads Held High" and "Into the Blue", string arrangements on "Silent Cry" and "Who's the Enemy"
- Taka Hirose - bass
- Mark Richardson - drums

Production

- Matt Sime - production, engineering, mixing on "Heads Held High" and "Into the Blue", string arrangements on "Silent Cry" and "Who's the Enemy"
- Ted Jensen - mastering
- Kevin Metcalfe - sequencing
- Adrian Bushby - mixing
- Helen Atkinson - mixing assistant
- Audrey Riley - string arrangements on "Silent Cry" and "Who's the Enemy"
- Chris Bolster - string engineering on "Silent Cry" and "Who's the Enemy"
- Stephen Marshall - string engineering assistant on "Silent Cry" and "Who's the Enemy"

Artwork

- Nils Leonard - art direction, illustration and design
- Max Oppenheim - photography
- Perou - photography
- Hank Gidney - image manipulation

Additional personnel

- Sarah Clark - backing vocals on "We Are the People", "Itsumo", and "Fires"
