= Jeep Renegade (disambiguation) =

The Jeep Renegade is a subcompact crossover SUV produced since 2014.

Jeep Renegade may also refer to:

- Jeep Renegade (concept), a 2008 concept vehicle
- Renegade, a trim package on different models of the Jeep CJ
- YJ Wrangler Renegade, a trim package of the Jeep Wrangler
- Renegade, a trim package of the Jeep Liberty
