= Jeep Renegade (concept) =

Jeep Renegade Concept
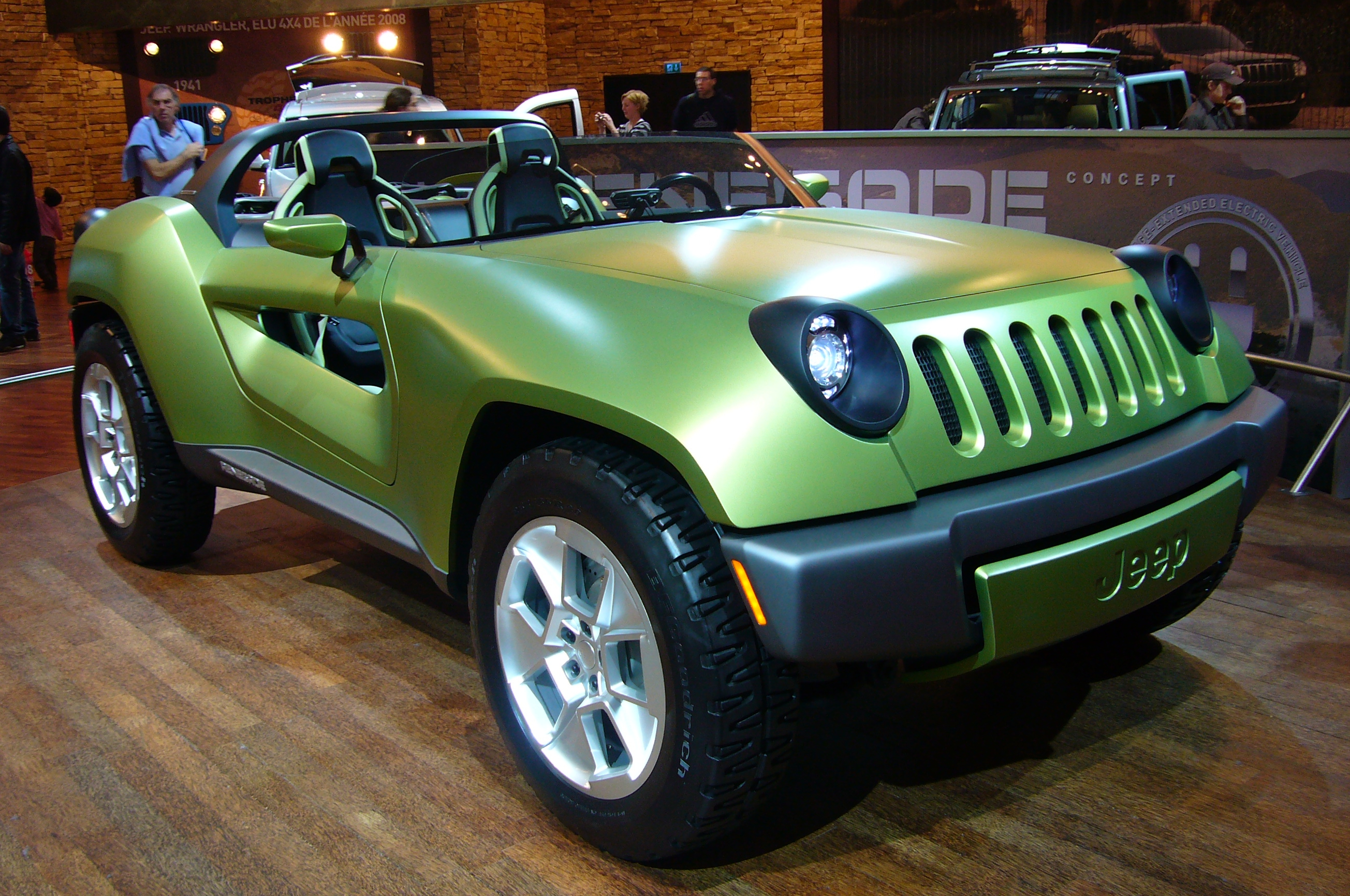
- Jeep Renegade Concept at the 2008 Paris Motor Show

Overview
- Manufacturer: Jeep
- Production: 2008

Body and chassis
- Class: Concept car
- Body style: 2-door off-road vehicle

Powertrain
- Engine: 1.5 L Bluetec I3 diesel
- Electric motor: x2 134 hp (100 kW) electric motor
- Battery: Lithium-ion
- Range: 650 km (400 mi)

Dimensions
- Wheelbase: 2,580 mm (102 in)
- Length: 3,885 mm (153.0 in)
- Width: 1,598 mm (62.9 in)
- Height: 1,431 mm (56.3 in)
- Curb weight: 1,429 kg (3,150 lb)

The Jeep Renegade is a hybrid off-road concept car manufactured by Jeep. The car was first exhibited at the 2008 North American International Auto Show.

== Specifications ==
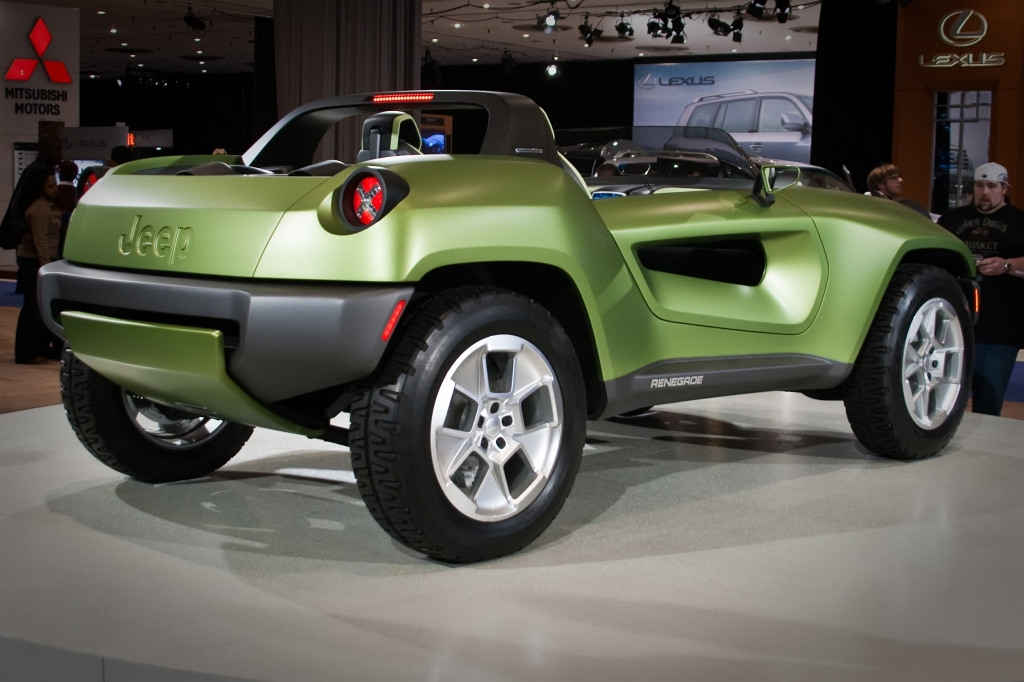
Rear view

=== Design and construction ===
The body of the Renegade features no roof, a low windshield and doors with cutouts in the middle. The chassis and interior are made from a single piece of aluminum. The Renegade was designed to be environmentally friendly, and is reportedly fully recyclable due to its use of environmentally responsible materials. The exterior features a matte finish which is molded in, instead of painted, in order to cut down on paint fumes and the use of solvents.

=== Features ===
The interior was designed to be modular, and Jeep claims that it would be easy to reconfigure the car from left to right hand drive. It was also designed to be able to be hosed down for easy cleaning, with a drain in the floor to let water out. It features one-piece molded soy-based foam seats and doors. The center console features a thermal unit, which could be used to heat or cool food.

=== Powertrain ===
The Renegade is the first Jeep to use a hybrid drive system. The engine consists of two electric motors which each produce 134 hp (100 kW), as well as a 1.5L Bluetec I3 diesel engine, which produces 115 hp (86 kW) for a total of 383 hp (286 kW). The total range of the car is 400 mi (644 km). Chrysler estimated fuel economy of 110 mpg and a top speed of 90 mph (145 km/h).
