= Idaho (Feeder song) =

Single by Feeder

from the album Generation Freakshow
- Released: 26 August 2012
- Recorded: 2011
- Genre: Post-grunge; alternative rock
- Length: 3:29
- Label: Big Teeth Music
- Songwriter: Grant Nicholas
- Producers: Chris Sheldon; Grant Nicholas

Feeder singles chronology
"Children of the Sun" (2012)	"Idaho" (2012)	"Universe of Life" (2016)

Idaho is the third single to be released from the album Generation Freakshow by the British rock band Feeder. It was released on vinyl the week commencing 27 August 2012, although the digital format was already released the day prior.

As the single was only released on a 7" vinyl and digital download, while not attracting mainstream airplay like many of Feeder's recent singles, "Idaho" did not chart within the top 200, but made the top 10 on the physical sales chart at No.5. At the time downloads were the only digital variant to compile the main chart, while streaming had yet to take off to be considered in the calculation.

It would not be until another 12 more years after the release of this single, that Feeder would again release another single on physical format in which a double A side of "Unconditional" / "Scream" from their 2024 double album Black / Red was released on the 23 August 2024.

== Music video ==
The video features Grant Nicholas and Taka Hirose in a bar, while the main character, played by Daniel Mays and dressed as the Lone Ranger, attempts a mechanical bull ride to win a trip to Idaho. This has often been seen as Feeder's "most laziest video" by many fans, as Nicholas and Hirose are only seen sitting down talking to people they do not seem to know while drinking alcohol, with only occasional shots of Nicholas lip-synching to the lyrics.

The video was shot on July 27, 2012. The night before, the band had played a gig on Lusty Glaze Beach, Cornwall finishing late on into the night before travelling back to London for the video shoot the following morning. They were forced to leave Cornwall earlier than originally anticipated, being due to the anticipated high volume of traffic caused by the opening night of the Olympics. In retrospect, these events were pointed out as evident for the band looking tired in the video.

== Flash game ==
An online flash game entitled "Beat the Bull" based on the video was released on Feeder's website and Facebook page to promote the song, in which the player must keep the character on the mechanical bull for a set period of time. Three songs could be won upon completing various milestones; Headstrong, from the Generation Freakshow album; Along the Avenues, a b-side to the single Borders; and an instrumental version of Idaho.

== Track listing ==
=== 7" vinyl ===
1. "Idaho" - 3:29
2. "Stay If You Want To" - 2:44

=== Digital download ===
1. "Idaho" - 3:29
2. "Stay If You Want To" - 2:44

=== Bonus downloads ===
1. "Headstrong" - 3:13
2. "Along the Avenues" - 2:36
3. "Idaho (Instrumental)" - 3:30
