= Renegades (band) =

British rock band

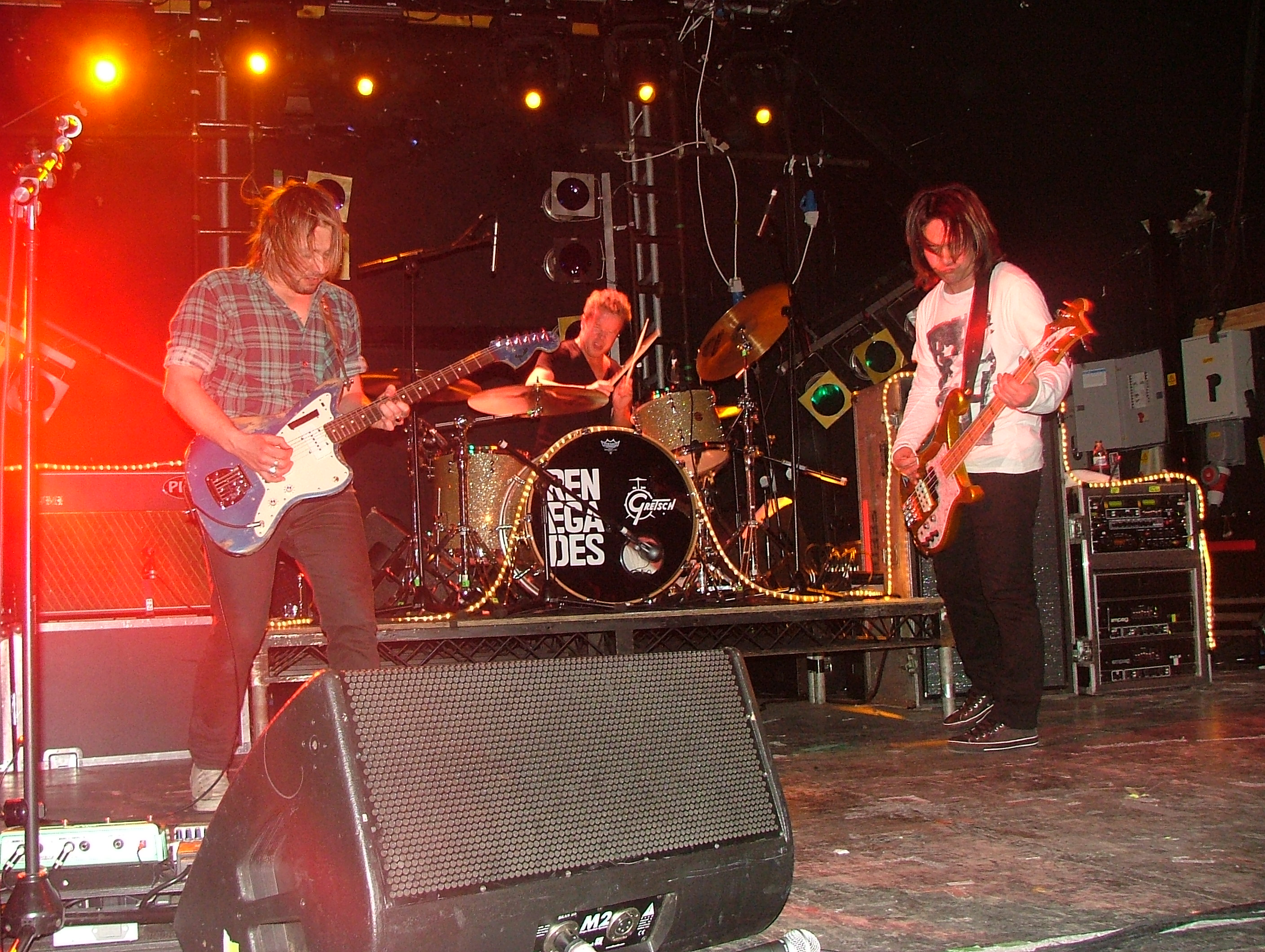
- Renegades playing a live gig at the Electric Ballroom in Camden; 22 April 2010

Background information
- Origin: London, United Kingdom
- Genres: Alternative rock; grunge
- Years active: 2009–2010
- Label: Big Teeth Music
- Spinoff of: Feeder
- Past members: Grant Nicholas; Taka Hirose; Karl Brazil
- Website: www.feederweb.com

Renegades were a British rock band which started out as a side-project from two members of the band Feeder, featuring guitarist Grant Nicholas and bassist Taka Hirose, before becoming a pseudonym name for Feeder themselves. Nicholas formed Renegades alongside Hirose with Karl Brazil from Ben's Brother, who completed the group and a four-track EP was then recorded. Soon later, Renegades became an alternative name for Feeder at various concerts where they would play an entire show pretending not to be Feeder, but a different band with the same members. If Feeder songs released before the Renegades album were to be played, the band would announce that they're covering Feeder songs. Grant Nicholas once introduced "Tangerine" as "A cover of a song from a band we know".

The idea was created when Feeder parted company with drummer Mark Richardson who returned to his previous band Skunk Anansie. Brazil was initially contracted with the band to assist them on their June dates playing various university events, before then playing the UK leg of the Sonisphere Festival. He was however recording with the band alongside Mexicolas drummer Tim Trotter, before the idea came about to use a selection of the tracks for the 'Renegades' project. The tracks originally intended for the side-project were soon used for the seventh Feeder album Renegades. The side-project was as a result used as a method to promote the Renegades album at live shows where they would mainly play the new songs, thus avoiding having to play any of their hits if they played as Feeder.

On the first of January 2010, a four-day countdown timer was added to the band's official website. As the countdown was completed on 6 January 2010, the title-track for the EP, "Renegades" was released as a free download as well as a package containing the limited edition EP, Renegades shirt, badge set and an e-ticket for one of the six shows available. The Renegades EP was the first release on the band's own record label, before being followed-up by a second EP. Feeder also used the Renegades name for their Sonisphere 2010 appearance, which was their last UK show using this name and also their tour of Japan in July of the same year. The track "Renegades" was re-released, but this time as a Feeder single instead of Renegades and was also on vinyl and download only.

== Band members ==
Official members

- Grant Nicholas - Lead vocals, Guitar (2009–2010)
- Taka Hirose - Bass guitar (2009–2010)
- Karl Brazil - Drums (2009–2010)

Feeder's touring members Dean Tidey and Dean Deavall didn't feature in this version of the band as the project had much focus on their 'three piece' aspects. When the band play as Feeder, Dean Deavall joins in with his usual keyboard playing duties. Dean Tidey has not appeared with Feeder since Sonisphere 2009 and no announcement has been made on his next appearance with the band.

== Live sets ==
The band played a series of 10 new songs during their first tour, with 13 in total. Three of these were Feeder 'covers', these were "Tangerine", "Sweet 16" and "Descend". Grant Nicholas told XFM that 25 songs have been recorded. On their second tour the Feeder 'covers' were "Women in Towels", "Shade", "Tangerine", "Sweet 16", "Lost and Found", "Descend" and "Godzilla". For one date the band performed a cover of the Nirvana track "Breed", which they have performed in the past as Feeder. "World Asleep" was on setlists for the second tour, but was never performed; it would not be until 2022 at a Feeder gig in Bexhill. Every track played live as Renegades has appeared on the album, although "City in a Rut" was only performed at Edinburgh on the second tour.

== Business practice ==
On their first tour, Renegades worked out their DIY aesthetic by cutting down on the usual costs their tours entailed as Feeder. Their decisions were partly motivated by pragmatic considerations that were essentially a British rock version of simple living: for example, selling merchandise on tour would require a full-time merchandise salesperson who would require lodging, food, and other costs, so Renegades decided to simplify their touring by not selling merchandise at the venues, but instead via a £35 package including a gig ticket, badge set and Renegades T-shirt. This also as a result cut down on transport costs for the merchandise, as well as cutting down costs on producing tickets, as the tickets for the tour were instead e-tickets. Costs were further cut down on by not using tour buses to transfer from one city to the next. Unlike some similar, small-scale independent rock contemporaries, Renegades' tour was profitable, due to their low business overhead costs, the band's keen sense of audience response in given regions in the past during Feeder tours, as well as the popularity of the band and fanbase dedication towards them beforehand as Feeder. The band also used the project to "start off where it all began for us" and also give newer fans an idea of what the older early tours were like, therefore creating more interest.

On 12 February 2010, Renegades announced another tour via Feederweb. The venues this time were bigger than the ones on their first tour under this moniker, with the tickets this time being dealt with by external ticket agencies. The band also produced another EP for the tour, but instead of mailing these out, they were handed out to ticket buyers on the door. Five of the six dates sold out on the tour with merchandise available at each date. This became the last UK tour the side-project took on, as future bookings were then advertised under the Feeder name. Their Sonisphere 2010 appearance and a tour of Japan was billed as Renegades, with a UK tour at the end of 2010 promoted as Feeder. Their show on 31 July 2010 at the Sonisphere festival, turned out to be their last ever show as Renegades.

== Grant Nicholas on Renegades ==
Looking back on this version of the band, Grant Nicholas explained in an interview with Culture Deluxe, "We were going to do it so underground, just turning up at venues and not even saying who we were, just doing gigs like any other band do and like we did when we first started. But we felt that by just road testing the new album some of the real diehard fans might feel a little bit left out so we kind of hinted that we were doing this thing but we didn’t say exactly what it was. Some of them got it straight away, "I’m sure they’re just doing this…" but some of them thought we'd split up or it was a new name or I'd done a solo record or whatever but it got people talking and excited and that was kind of the point as well. We didn't sit down and work out this massive, amazing marketing plan, it wasn't that calculated but it was just a way of us going back to doing some very small shows away from the usual Feeder thing and not having to play all the usual songs we always have to play. Not that we hate them, it's just nice to do something different sometimes and be able to play a whole album live, which we haven't done since our first album. The more albums you do and the more singles you have, that steadily becomes your set and it's very difficult to get away from that because people go "oh I went to see so and so play and they didn’t play any of the fucking singles", you know it happens and people get pissed off about it so that would be the point. It was a bit confusing as there were some gigs where the promoters put Feeder on the bloody tickets so some more mainstream fans turned up and were like "what the fuck’s this?" you know, "where’s "Buck Rogers"?" but that was bound to happen, you can’t keep everyone happy. But we had a great time doing it, it was such good fun".

== Discography ==
=== Extended plays ===
Date	EP	Comments
6 January 2010	Renegades EP (Black)	4-track EP containing the track "Renegades".
7 April 2010	Renegades EP (White)	EP released on second tour

- Renegades is an album by Feeder, which contains selected material from the two extended plays and songs exclusive to the album.

== See also ==
- Feeder
- Ben's Brother
