= Another Yesterday =

Compilation album by Feeder
- Released: 17 January 2000
- Recorded: 1998–1999
- Genres: Alternative rock; post-grunge; post-Britpop; indie rock
- Labels: Echo; Pony Canyon
- Producer: Feeder

Feeder chronology
Yesterday Went Too Soon (1999)	Another Yesterday (2000)	Echo Park (2001)

Another Yesterday is a B-sides compilation album by the UK rock band Feeder, and was released on 17 January 2000, being only a Japanese import.

The B-sides are taken from the singles of the band's 1999 album Yesterday Went Too Soon. A few of them already appeared on the Japanese release of that album, and so were not included on this album. A few of those B-sides that had not appeared on the Japanese release of the album were simply not selected for the album. The UK single version of "Paperfaces" was included, as no singles were released in Japan from the album, nor was there an EP like there has been so far with all of their other albums.

Inside the album's inlay booklet is a letter written in Japanese from the band's Japanese bass player, Taka Hirose.

== Track listing ==
1. "Paperfaces" (UK Single Mix)
2. "Whooey"
3. "Divebomb"
4. "Rubberband"
5. "Space Age Hero"
6. "Slider"
7. "Tomorrow Shine"
8. "Living in Polaroid"
9. "Getting to Know You Well"
10. "Honeyfuzz"
