= Day In Day Out (Feeder song) =

Single by Feeder

from the album Yesterday Went Too Soon
- Released: 22 March 1999
- Recorded: 1998
- Genre: Post-grunge
- Length: 3:39
- Label: Echo
- Songwriter: Grant Nicholas
- Producers: Grant Nicholas, Feeder

Feeder singles chronology
"Suffocate" (1998)	"Day In Day Out" (1999)	"Insomnia" (1999)

"Day In Day Out" is a single from the UK rock band Feeder, and was the first single to be taken from their second album Yesterday Went Too Soon.

The lyrics refer to an employee doing the same menial daily tasks, and wanting to get away from it all. Grant once said that the distorted vocal emulates that of a tannoy in a supermarket. The Dandy Warhols 2003 hit "We Used to Be Friends" duplicates the bassline from the track. Feeder's Grant Nicholas was given a co-writer credit on the single and the corresponding album.

The track along with its video appeared at #70 on VH2's "Indie 500" rundown of 2004, which was a list of the channel's top 500 indie tracks of all time.

It peaked at number 31 on the UK Singles Chart, but despite reaching the top 40 (the cut-off point for tracks on the main album of The Singles), at the bands request it was not included on the main CD their singles album, although appears on the DVD version packaged with limited quantities of the release. The song was also included in their compilation album The Best of Feeder / Arrow.

== Video ==
The video features band members Grant Nicholas, Taka Hirose, and Jon Lee performing in separate enclosed hollow glass boxes with shots of various random people staring at them.

== Track listing ==
=== CD1 ===
1. "Day In Day Out"- 3:39
2. "Can't Dance to Disco" - 3:02
3. "Honeyfuzz" - 1:54

=== CD2 ===
1. "Day In Day Out" - 3:39
2. "I Need a Buzz" - 2:50
3. "Don't Bring Me Down" - 2:16

=== 7" (White) ===
1. "Day In Day Out" - 3:39
2. "Can't Dance to Disco" - 3:02
3. "Honeyfuzz" - 1:54
