= Two Colours (EP) =

Two Colours EP

EP by Feeder
- Released: 25 September 1995
- Genre: Grunge
- Length: 7:19
- Label: Echo
- Producer: Brian Sperber

Feeder chronology
Two Colours EP (1995)	Swim EP (1996)

Two Colours EP is Feeder's first release on The Echo Label. Released on a 7" and a CD in 1995 (see 1995 in music), it is one of the hardest Feeder records to find nowadays (the hardest is a 12" White Label vinyl of their hit single "Buck Rogers", limited to 11 copies), occasionally a copy will become available on eBay. The two songs were later re-recorded and re-released with both appearing as b-sides on the "Cement" single. "Chicken On A Bone" was also included on the re-release of "Swim".

The title came about because the band and label could only afford to print the release in two colours.

The EP was originally only available at Feeder's early gigs and only around 1500 copies were ever produced on CD, along with around 1000 on 7" single.

It is due to its rarity that the single often sells for prices over 40 pounds on auction sites, with the highest being over £100. As Feeder have got more popular, the value of the single had increased until 2008 when radio play interest declined and the price of the EP with it, but despite this the release is still valuable. In 1996 there were plans to release "Two Colours 2" featuring a Brian Serper remix of "Women in Towels", only for the project to be shelved then later cancelled.

== Track listing ==
1. "Chicken on a Bone" – 3:28
2. "Pictures of Pain" - 3:40
