= High (Feeder song) =

1997 single by Feeder

Single by Feeder

from the album Polythene
- B-side: "Wishing for the Sun"; "Women in Towels"; "Sweet Sixteen"
- Released: 6 October 1997
- Length: 4:32
- Label: Echo
- Songwriter: Grant Nicholas
- Producers: Grant Nicholas; Feeder; Steve Power

Feeder singles chronology
"Crash" (1997)	"High" (1997)	"Suffocate" (1998)

Music video
- "High" on YouTube

"High" is a song by Feeder, released as the fourth and final single from their 1997 debut album, Polythene. This track was not included on the album until its re-issue in October of the same year and is seen as a fan anthem.

== Reception ==
It was the first Feeder single to be playlisted on BBC Radio 1, reaching number 24 on the UK Singles Chart making it their first top 40 hit. It also got extensive radio play, and made the B-list. Frontman Grant Nicholas was once quoted saying that the song is about friendship and the drawbacks of relationships. It's been strongly hinted that the line "I'm going out for a while, so I can get high with my friends" is a reference to marijuana. It also is regarded as the song that kept the band in the United States for 11 months during 1998, touring with Everclear.

The track was featured in the film Can't Hardly Wait in 1998, and reached numbers 24 and 36 on the Billboard Mainstream Rock and Modern Rock Tracks charts, respectively. Because of Billboard chart rules at the time, the song was ineligible to chart on the Hot 100 due to a lack of commercial single release. However, the soundtrack album of Can't Hardly Wait was certified gold by the Recording Industry Association of America (RIAA) for 500,000 units shipped, and "High" was one of the most requested tracks on US college radio during the summer of 1998.

Before the single's release, Kerrang! rated the single with three out of five stars, saying that "while Feeder probably couldn't write a duff track if their orange jumpsuits depended on it, "High" certainly isn't as shiny or effervescent as the likes of "Cement" or "Tangerine", although they commented that it had a "large and graceful chorus" and that the song "could be the one to finally get them some airplay." By 2005, the magazine's opinion of the song had become much more favourable, including the song in an eight-song list of the band's "Past Glories"−a list of "classic feeder moments" that would provide an alternative to Pushing the Senses. They noted that the song became "their first real taste of success" and said the song was "Today" "by The Smashing Pumpkins done in Brit-style". In 2006, Sputnikmusic said the song is an "uplifting summer anthem" and "a great single with catchy chorus" which "showed early on the potential of Feeder's quieter side".

== Legacy ==
Two days after drummer Jon Lee committed suicide at his home in Miami, on 7 January 2002 BBC Radio 1 DJ Steve Lamacq broadcast a tribute show to him, as part of his then show titled The Evening Session. Many fans earlier on in the day contacted Steve to play "High" as a tribute to Jon at the end of his show, which he did. When the band returned to the live stage in August of that year, all live performances of "High" saw Grant Nicholas play an acoustic guitar instead of an electric guitar as with all performances prior to this. Touring guitarist Dean Tidey played all the electric parts of the song. This was the only year the song was performed with this arrangement. The band's appearance at the Reading and Leeds festivals saw them play the second stage, to reflect the low-key profile to their shows and that Melvin Benn, the festival's organiser had invited them to play the Main Stage as first day headliner, only to turn this down as they did not want to play such a high-profile show too soon after Jon Lee's passing. The second stage to this festival was then called The Evening Session Stage, the same name as Steve Lamacq's show at the time.

== Track listings and formats ==
- UK 7-inch single
1. "High" – 4:32
2. "Wishing for the Sun" – 3:30
- UK CD1
1. "High" – 4:32
2. "Wishing for the Sun" – 3:30
3. "Women in Towels" – 2:30
4. "Cement" (video)
- UK CD2
1. "High" – 4:32
2. "High" (acoustic) – 3:49
3. "Sweet Sixteen" – 3:30
4. "Crash" (video)
- Japanese EP
1. "High" – 4:33
2. "Crash" (radio mix) – 3:47
3. "My Perfect Day" – 4:37
4. "Change" – 3:24
5. "Pictures of Pain" – 3:47
6. "Sweet Sixteen" – 3:34
7. "Forgive" (acoustic session) – 4:01

== Charts ==
=== Weekly charts ===
Chart (1997–1998)	Peak position
Europe (Eurochart Hot 100)	77
Scottish Singles Sales (Official Charts)	25
UK Singles (Official Charts)	24
US Alternative Airplay (Billboard)	24
US Mainstream Rock (Billboard)	36

=== Year-end charts ===
Chart (1998)	Position
US Modern Rock Tracks (Billboard)	87

== Release history ==
Region	Date	Format(s)	Label(s)	Ref.
United Kingdom	6 October 1997	7-inch vinyl; CD	Echo	
Japan	17 December 1997	CD	Echo	
United States	5 May 1998	Alternative radio	Elektra	
