= Suffocate (Feeder song) =

1997 song by Feeder

Song by Feeder

from the album Polythene
- Released: 19 May 1997
- Recorded: Mid 1996
- Genre: Alternative rock
- Length: 3:53
- Label: Echo
- Songwriter(s): Jon Lee, Grant Nicholas, Taka Hirose
- Producer(s): Chris Sheldon, Feeder

"Suffocate"

Single by Feeder
- Released: 16 February 1998
- Recorded: late 1997
- Genre: Alternative rock
- Length: 4:42
- Label: Echo
- Songwriter(s): Jon Lee, Grant Nicholas, Taka Hirose
- Producer(s): Grant Nicholas, Chris Sheldon

Feeder singles chronology
"High" (1997)	"Suffocate" (1998)	"Day In Day Out" (1999)

"Suffocate" is a track by the UK rock band Feeder, re-recorded from their 1997 album Polythene. It was released as an in-between single to bridge the gap between Polythene and its follow-up, Yesterday Went Too Soon. Feeder later repeated this in-between single process building up to a following album, with "Just a Day" in 2001 and "Shatter" / "Tender" in 2005. The single reached the UK Singles Chart, peaking at number 37.

The version of "Suffocate" released as a single is a full-band version of the acoustic track from the Polythene album, with slightly amended lyrics. The song began in 1994 as part of the band's demo under the name "Give". At that time, the band was called Real. At the time of its single release, Grant Nicholas said that he wanted to revisit the song.

Frontman Grant also once said that "Give" was the song that secured the band's record deal, which in turn was one of the reasons for its inclusion on The Singles album.

== Track listing ==
=== CD1 ===
1. "Suffocate" (single version)
2. "Eclipse"
3. "Cockroach"
4. "High" (Live from Reading 97' video)

=== CD2 ===
1. "Suffocate" (single version)
2. "Dry" (acoustic)
3. "Spill"
4. "Descend" (Live from Reading 97' video)

=== 7" vinyl (Dark Purple) ===
1. "Suffocate" (single version)
2. "Eclipse"
