= Generation Freakshow =

Studio album by Feeder
- Released: 23 April 2012
- Recorded: 2009–12
- Genres: Alternative rock; indie rock; power pop; post-grunge
- Length: 45:47
- Label: Big Teeth Music
- Producers: Grant Nicholas; Chris Sheldon

Feeder chronology
Renegades (2010)	Generation Freakshow (2012)	All Bright Electric (2016)

Singles from Generation Freakshow
- 1. "Borders" Released: 30 January 2012; 2. "Children of the Sun" Released: 30 April 2012; 3. "Idaho" Released: 27 August 2012

Generation Freakshow is the eighth studio album by Welsh rock band Feeder. It was released on 23 April 2012. It was due to be the second in a series of two albums released in 2010 by the band, following up previous album Renegades. However, the band decided to hold more recording sessions for the album, leading them to delay the album until 2012.

== Recording and production ==
In 2010, during the Renegades sessions, a number of tracks were left off the album before then being considered for inclusion for the follow-up to that album. As there were not enough to fit on the album, more were recorded during the closing stages of the year, with the band taking a break from recording on 19 December, before resuming recording on 10 January 2011. Between 16 January and 24 January a production session began in New York City, this included overdubs, guitars and keyboards with frontman Grant Nicholas also flying over to record vocals, while some of the album was already recorded in London. On 19 January 2011 a photo of song lyrics written on a sheet of paper was posted on their official Facebook page. One song was debuted live on tour later revealed to be "Borders". In an interview with Heineken Music, on 27 January 2011 Grant revealed that 19 or 20 songs were in the recording stages, while the album, like Renegades, looked likely to be released domestically on their own Big Teeth Music imprint.

In an interview with The University Observer, Grant describes the album: "Its eclectic, much more eclectic than the Renegades album... Its definitely a more commercial record. I think if you liked Comfort in Sound and you liked Yesterday Went Too Soon, then I think you’ll like this album" ... "There are some real tunes on this and some anthems; there are some rocky moments as well". There were also plans to release a single or a free track download during their February - March tour. This later went on to become "Side By Side", which was a chart-eligible paid download in aid of the victims of the 2011 Tōhoku earthquake and tsunami in Japan. The single charted at #91, marking their first top 100 chart visit since 2008's "We Are the People", while becoming their 25th top 100 single in the process. It ultimately did not appear on the album, although was included as a bonus track on the Japanese release. During their 2011 touring, Feeder introduced drummer Damon Wilson as a live regular and session musician. On 23 September 2011, Grant Nicholas posted on the band's Facebook page that the recording of their studio album was complete with only mixing on the final song to be finalised, before mastering then began on the 30 September in New York. Feeder announced on 10 October that they were doing artwork on the album, before an announcement was made on 14 November, that acoustic versions of some of the songs were being recorded while bassist Taka Hirose was staying in Tokyo. On 29 November 2011, the sequencing process of the album began.

Feeder hosted a trailer on YouTube titled "Coming Soon" on 2 December 2011 and had a message written in Morse code as "-... --- .-. -.. . .-. ...", which translates to "Borders" in standard English. On 6 December 2011 another trailer was released, announcing "Borders" as the first single from the new album, including a four-date tour. "Borders" was released on CD, cassette and 7" on 30 January 2012, with the parent album Generation Freakshow on 23 April 2012. This was the first time Feeder released a cassette single since 2001's "Just a Day"; "Borders" went on to chart at #52. The only track from the sessions of the Renegades album to end up on Generation Freakshow, was that of "Tiny Minds".

== Reception ==
Professional ratings
Aggregate scores
Source	Rating
Metacritic	60/100
Review scores
Source	Rating
AllMusic	3.5/5 stars
BBC Music	(positive)
Drowned In Sound	7/10 stars
FMV Magazine	2/5 stars
The Guardian	2/5 stars
Kerrang!	4/5 stars
Metro	2/5 stars
musicOMH	2.5/5 stars
Q	2/5 stars

Generation Freakshow was met with mixed reviews and was a commercial failure due to not reaching the top 10 of the album charts; where the band frequently chart. Although their previous album also failed to make the top 10, there was a lot of hope for the band to return to the top 10 with this album. They would have to wait until 2016 to make a return.

Metro described Feeder as "keeping a steady musical pace, yet stick to the same predictable formula" when reviewing Generation Freakshow.BBC Music praised the album as "more mature, more considered and less noisy". After two weeks the album had sold 9000 copies in the UK.

The album received a two star rating from The Guardian, being described as "solid yet uninspiring".

Drowned in Sound credited Feeder for creating another strong addition to their back catalogue. Kerrang! were also positive in their review, stating that "the 12 fabulous songs that comprise Generation Freakshow see Feeder striking the canvas with more measured strokes".

The album was a relative commercial failure, charting at #13 in the UK albums chart, despite being an improvement on the #16 of Renegades. Lead single “Borders" however brought Feeder back into the top 75 charts after a near four-year absence, when it charted at #52 in February 2012; none of the singles on Renegades charted. The album also seen the band return to the Brixton Academy after a four-year absence, one of the UK's major gig venues. Before this, the band had returned to the smaller venues within the capital and the rest of the UK.

It was at this Brixton show on 23 November 2012, Nicholas repeated on stage a statement he made months prior to the tour, being that the band were going to go away for a while and work on outside projects, which caused many to speculate that the band were going to split up later down the line. The commercial failure of the album was a contributing factor to the decision to take a break, before releasing their comeback album in 2016, which brought the band back into the Top 10; an uninterrupted run which has so far lasted five albums in total.

In August 2019, the band were inducted into the Kerrang! Hall of Fame, with this album being one of the reasons the band were inducted, being due to the 4/5 rating their magazine counterpart awarded the album.

== Track listing ==
All songs written by Grant Nicholas.

No.	Title	Length
1.	"Oh My"	3:39
2.	"Borders"	3:29
3.	"Idaho"	3:28
4.	"Hey Johnny"	3:27
5.	"Quiet"	5:06
6.	"Sunrise"	4:02
7.	"Generation Freakshow"	2:49
8.	"Tiny Minds"	3:15
9.	"In All Honesty"	2:52
10.	"Headstrong"	3:13
11.	"Fools Can't Sleep"	3:48
12.	"Children of the Sun" - includes hidden track "Sky Life"	6:32 (4:19/2:12)

Japanese edition bonus track
No.	Title	Length
13.	"Side By Side"	3:46
14.	"Idaho" (Masafumi Gotoh (Asian Kung-Fu Generation) cover version)	3:29
15.	"Generation Freakshow" (Takeshi Hosomi (The Hiatus) cover version)	2:51

UK iTunes bonus track
No.	Title	Length
13.	"Miles Away"	3:47

2017 reissue bonus tracks
No.	Title	Length
13.	"Sky Life"	2:11
14.	"Miles Away"	3:47
15.	"No Light"	3:14
16.	"Arms"	3:33
17.	"Coast to Coast"	3:00
18.	"Along the Avenues"	2:38
19.	"Find a Place"	3:18
20.	"Stay If You Want To"	2:46
21.	"Borders (Acoustic)"	3:38

== Personnel ==
- Grant Nicholas – vocals, guitars, keyboards, percussion, production
- Taka Hirose – bass guitars, backing vocals
- Karl Brazil – drums, percussion

Production

- Chris Sheldon – production, engineering, additional engineering on "Tiny Minds", mixing
- Matt Sime – engineering and additional production on "Tiny Minds"
- Brian Sperber – mixing, additional backing vocal on "Oh My", additional keyboard on "Hey Johnny"
- Paul Spong – trumpet on "In All Honesty"
- Tom Fuller – assistant engineer
- George Apison – assistant engineer
- Ted Jensen – mastering
- Nigel Walton – sequencing
- Roger Ballen – photography
- Scarlet Page – photography
