= Borders (Feeder song) =

Single by Feeder

from the album Generation Freakshow
- Released: 30 January 2012
- Recorded: 2011
- Length: 3:29
- Label: Big Teeth Music
- Songwriter: Grant Nicholas
- Producers: Chris Sheldon; Grant Nicholas

Feeder singles chronology
"Side by Side" (2011)	"Borders" (2012)	"Children of the Sun" (2012)

"Borders" is a song by Feeder, released as the group's first single from their eighth album Generation Freakshow in 2012.

The single charted at No. 52 in the UK, giving the group their 25th top 75 single and first UK chart visit since 2008's "We Are the People".

The song was released on CD, cassette and 7" on 30 January 2012, with the parent album Generation Freakshow on 23 April 2012. This was the first time Feeder released a cassette single since 2001's "Just a Day".

== Reception ==
According to trade magazine Music Week, "Borders" charted at No. 52 with 4,663 sales. That week "Borders" sold 2,978 copies digitally, with 644 on CD, 574 on 7" and 467 on cassette, giving total physical sales of 1,685. It was the first Top 75 single to include sales from a cassette since Busted's 2004 single "Who's David?", which reached No. 1 in 2004.

"Borders" was also that week's No.1 vinyl single, while also being the No. 2 overall physical seller behind the previous year's Christmas No. 1 "Wherever You Are" by The Military Wives. Despite being the best-selling of the four formats, the digital formats was not amongst the Top 75 downloads, nor would have these sales been strong enough alone to warrant a Top 75 chart position.

Despite the relative success of the single, it is however seen by many fans as one of the band's weakest songs and many complaints on social media, have described the song as being "overplayed at gigs" and was met with muted responses when played in 2011 as a new song. It was last played during the 2018 Best Of Tour, while the whole of the Generation Freakshow album has not been played since either.

== Music video ==
The song's video features band members Grant Nicholas and Taka Hirose along with drummer Damon Wilson performing the track in a forest surrounded by bright lights while cut-scenes of a girl named Jessie, played by Madeline Duggan, illustrates the song's story.

The video has been criticised by fans, citing that music videos that tell the story behind the song, don't always work well.

== Track listing ==
=== CD ===
1. "Borders" – 3:29
2. "Arms" – 3:34

=== 7" vinyl ===
1. "Borders" – 3:29
2. "Coast to Coast" – 2:56

=== Cassette ===
1. "Borders" – 3:29
2. "Along the Avenues" – 2:36

=== Digital download ===
1. "Borders" – 3:29
2. "Arms" – 3:34
3. "Borders (Acoustic) – 3:38
4. "Side by Side (Acoustic)" – 3:34
