= Paperfaces =

1999 song by Feeder

Single by Feeder

from the album Yesterday Went Too Soon
- Released: 20 November 1999
- Recorded: late 1998
- Genre: Alternative rock
- Length: 4:28 (LP version without hidden track)
- Label: Echo
- Songwriter: Grant Nicholas
- Producers: Grant Nicholas and Feeder

Feeder singles chronology
"Yesterday Went Too Soon" (1999)	"Paperfaces" (1999)	"Buck Rogers" (2001)

"Paperfaces" is the fourth and final single from UK rock band Feeder's 1999 album Yesterday Went Too Soon. The version released on the single is a re-recording from that of the album version.

Upon release, the single was given little promotion by UK radio judging by the C-list placing on BBC Radio 1, as the previous two singles were played a lot more before release. The single peaked on the UK Singles Chart at #41. Frontman Grant Nicholas said the band were invited to perform the track on TFI Friday, but decided to U-turn on the band and instead gave the slot to the Stereophonics, meaning they appeared twice on the show and Feeder missed out on widespread promotion for this single.

However, the single did go top 40 in Scotland reaching No.37 and ever since the release of The Singles with an extra DVD of the band's videos, the song has seen a new lease of life. "Paperfaces" is about the idea of somebody ending a relationship, and then realising afterwards that the person they were with was somebody who meant a lot to them.

== Track listing ==
=== CD1 ===
1. "Paperfaces" (single version edit) - 4:09
2. "Whooey" - 3:57
3. "Tinsel Town" (Radio 1 session in Wales) - 3:55

=== CD2 ===
1. "Paperfaces" (single version) - 4:39
2. "Crash Mat" - 3:23
3. "You're My Evergreen" (Radio 1 session in Wales) - 3:24

=== MC ===
1. "Paperfaces" (single version) - 4:39
2. "Whooey" - 3:59
3. "Waiting For Changes" (Radio 1 session in Wales)
