= Yesterday Went Too Soon (song) =

Single by Feeder

from the album Yesterday Went Too Soon
- Released: 9 August 1999
- Recorded: late 1998
- Genre: Alternative rock, post-Britpop
- Length: 4:20
- Label: Echo
- Songwriter: Grant Nicholas
- Producers: Grant Nicholas and Feeder

Feeder singles chronology
"Insomnia" (1999)	"Yesterday Went Too Soon" (1999)	"Paperfaces" (1999)

"Yesterday Went Too Soon" is a single from UK rock band Feeder, released near in August 1999. It was the third single from the album of the same name. It was their first single to reach the UK top 20.

When MTV 2 came to the UK after the launch of digital television in 2000, the promo video was in heavy rotation.

On the MC (cassette) format of the single, the track "Oxidize" was made available on CD for the first time in 2004 via the b-sides album Picture of Perfect Youth.

The track was a critical success and was named Melody Maker's "Single of the Week". The song is about a relationship ending, and the person waiting for his partner to return to him.

== Track listing ==
=== CD1 ===
1. "Yesterday Went Too Soon" (edit)
2. "Getting to Know You Well" - 3:20
3. "Tomorrow Shine" - 5:07

=== CD2 ===
1. "Yesterday Went Too Soon" - 4:20
2. "Rubberband" - 3:45
3. "Slider" - 3:25

=== MC ===
1. "Yesterday Went Too Soon" - 4:20
2. "Oxidize" - 3:50
3. "Tomorrow Shine" - 5:07
