= Insomnia (Feeder song) =

1999 single by Feeder

Single by Feeder

from the album Yesterday Went Too Soon
- Released: 31 May 1999
- Length: 2:52
- Label: Echo
- Songwriter: Grant Nicholas
- Producers: Grant Nicholas, Feeder

Feeder singles chronology
"Day In Day Out" (1998)	"Insomnia" (1999)	"Yesterday Went Too Soon" (1999)

"Insomnia" is a song by Welsh rock band Feeder, released as the second single from their album Yesterday Went Too Soon. It reached number 22 on the UK Singles Chart and was at the time Feeder's fourth consecutive single to reach the top 40.

When the single charted in the UK, it was their biggest hit at the time and got them on the popular now defunct UK music show "Top Of The Pops". From there the band's awareness increased and the follow-up single "Yesterday Went Too Soon" cracked the top 20 and helped the album of the same name go top 10. It also seen their only performance on TFI Friday, also a now defunct TV show.

"Insomnia" is inspired by singer Grant Nicholas's experience of Feeder's first US tour in 1998 when he broke his ankle (among other injuries) and found it hard to sleep at nights.

== Reception ==
Michael Gallucci of AllMusic called "Insomnia" a "fine moment."

== Music video ==
The music video for Insomnia features Grant Nicholas, Taka Hirose, and late drummer Jon Lee performing in a hotel room and other various places including the band on a train and places around New York City.

== Track listings ==
UK CD1

1. "Insomnia"
2. "Space Age Hero"
3. "Living in Polaroid"

UK CD2

1. "Insomnia"
2. "Divebomb"
3. "Fly"

UK cassette single

1. "Insomnia"
2. "Cement" (live London Astoria April 1999)
3. "High" (live)

Australian CD single

1. "Insomnia"
2. "Space Age Hero"
3. "Living in Polaroid"
4. "Divebomb"
5. "Fly"

== Charts ==
Chart (1999)	Peak position
Europe (Eurochart Hot 100)	85
Scotland Singles (OCC)	27
UK Singles (OCC)	22

== Release history ==
Region	Date	Format(s)	Label(s)	Ref.
United Kingdom	31 May 1999	CD; cassette	Echo	
United States	14 September 1999	Mainstream rock; active rock; alternative radio	Echo; Elektra	

== Media usage ==
In the 2000 Channel 4 TV series Lock, Stock..., which was a spin-off of the film Lock, Stock and Two Smoking Barrels, "Insomnia" was heard playing at high volume from a gang members ghetto blaster during one of the episodes. It also features on the soundtrack album of the series.
