= Cathy Glass (author) =

British writer

- Occupations: Author, writer, foster carer
- Writing career
- Genres: Inspirational memoirs, fiction
- Website: cathyglass.co.uk

Cathy Glass is a British writer of non-fiction and 'inspirational' fiction. Cathy has written memoirs about the children she has fostered, many of whom have suffered abuse.

She has published 28 memoirs based on her experiences.

The name "Cathy Glass" is a pseudonym. The author writes under a pen name due to the sensitive nature of her source material. The names of the children she writes about are likewise altered.

== Fostering and parenting expertise ==
Glass used to work as a civil servant but left to start a family. The author decided to foster a child after trying unsuccessfully for a baby with her husband; she had seen an advert in her local paper seeking a foster home for a girl and applied as a foster carer.

== Writing career ==
Before the release of her first title she had written on health and social issues for The Guardian and the Evening Standard. Glass's first book, Damaged was released by HarperCollins in 2007. It focuses on the relationship between Glass and an abused child under her care.

Her fostering memoir, Will You Love Me?, published in September 2013. tells the story of her adopted daughter. ' The books "Nobody's Son", "Cruel to Be Kind" and "A Long Way From Home" are all set before Glass adopted her daughter; although were released after her book "Will you Love Me?" which tells her daughter's story. Her latest book An Innocent Baby was released on 16 September 2021 telling the story of Darcey-May and Haylea and "Neglected" was released on 17 February 2022. "A family torn apart" was released in September 2022.
