= Renegades (Feeder song) =

Single by Feeder

from the album Renegades
- Released: 23 August 2010
- Recorded: 2010
- Genre: Alternative rock, punk rock
- Length: 3:37
- Label: Big Teeth Music
- Songwriter: Grant Nicholas
- Producer: Grant Nicholas

Feeder singles chronology
"Call Out" (2010)	"Renegades" (2010)	""Down to the River / This Town"" (2010)

"Renegades" is a song by Feeder, released as the group's second single from their seventh album Renegades in 2010. The track started off life as a recording released under their Renegades side-project, with its release being on their first EP before then being included on the Feeder Renegades album. This single is also the only one to be released from Renegades that features any new material, with this being the B-side "Sending Out Waves". "Fallen", the B-side on "Call Out" started off life as a free download for anybody who purchased the second Renegades EP.

== Music video ==
The promotional video features the same character as seen in the "Call Out" video (later seen on the album artwork), destroying the band's dressing rooms while they are rehearsing nearby and also takes her frustrations out on other people. She is also seen topless in the video which is not censored, unlike the only scene of nudity in the video for "Lost and Found". At the end of the video she attempts to attack the band and sets fire to Karl Brazil's drum kit after they escape. The video has been criticised for being weak in its themes and ideas, while also for using uncensored material.

== In popular culture ==
- The song appears in the soundtrack for the video game Saints Row: The Third.

== Track listing ==
=== 7" vinyl ===
- "Renegades" - 3:37
- "Sending Out Waves" - 2:36
