= Side by Side (Feeder song) =

2011 song by Feeder

Single by Feeder
- Released: 27 March 2011
- Recorded: 2011
- Genre: Alternative rock
- Length: 3:46
- Label: Big Teeth Music
- Songwriter: Grant Nicholas
- Producer: Grant Nicholas

Feeder singles chronology
"Down to the River / This Town" (2010)	"Side by Side" (2011)	"Borders" (2012)

"Side by Side" is a download-only single by the British rock band Feeder. The song was released on 27 March 2011 to support victims of the 2011 Tōhoku earthquake and tsunami in Japan.

== Background ==
"Side by Side" was written and demoed during the sessions for Renegades under the title "Barbarella". Retitled "Side by Side", the song was released as Grant Nicholas felt that the song's chorus fitted the tsunami.

== Release ==
"Side by Side" charted at #91. Grant Nicholas cited on the band's Facebook page, that the single was released to help victims of the tsunami disaster, with the chart position not being as important.

Although not included on the UK release of Generation Freakshow, "Side by Side" did appear on the Japanese release which charted at #57 there.

Despite being a single release, the song has never been played live.

== Acoustic version ==
An acoustic version of "Side by Side" is included on the digital download release of 2012 single, "Borders".

== Track listing ==
=== Digital download ===
- "Side by Side" – 3:46
