= Children of the Sun (Feeder song) =

Single by Feeder

from the album Generation Freakshow
- Released: 30 April 2012
- Recorded: 2011
- Genre: Alternative rock
- Length: 4:05
- Label: Big Teeth Music
- Songwriter(s): Grant Nicholas
- Producer(s): Chris Sheldon, Grant Nicholas

Feeder singles chronology
"Borders" (2012)	"Children of the Sun" (2012)	"Idaho" (2012)

Children of the Sun is the second single to be released from the album Generation Freakshow by the British rock band Feeder. It was released physically on 30 April 2012, one day after the album charted at #13 on the UK albums chart; the digital format was released the previous day.

Although previous single "Borders" was released on four multiple formats, "Children of the Sun" was only released on two being a limited 7" vinyl and digital download, thus reverting to the release format pattern of their most previous singles. Airplay for the single was much more limited than "Borders", while not being released while the band were on tour in which "Borders" was. This helped that single chart at #52, while "Children of the Sun" without that support did not chart in the top 200. The band decided not to release a CD format due to this reason (being on tour would have allowed them to do a similar sales push campaign). The single however made No.3 on the physical sales chart.

The album's title track was due to be released as a single on 12 March. Promotional copies were sent to radio stations but as response was poor, the band chose to not release it.

== Music video ==
The video features the band with Damon Wilson on drums, playing in a dark room while an artificial light-emitted-sun is seen behind the band. Cut scenes of ice creams, glasses of ice and three women sunbathing are shown throughout the video.

On 10 November 2017 while the band were rehearsing for their then upcoming tour, the guitar Nicholas played in the video was stolen from a nearby equipment depot. The culprit, nor the guitar, has to date been found.

== Track listing ==
=== 7" vinyl ===
1. "Children of the Sun" - 4:05
2. "Find a Place" - 3:19

=== Digital download ===
1. "Children of the Sun" - 4:05
2. "Find a Place" - 3:19
