= Renegades (Feeder album) =

Studio album by Feeder
- Released: 5 July 2010
- Recorded: 2009
- Genres: Alternative rock; post-grunge; hard rock
- Length: 34:49 (Standard edition)
- Label: Big Teeth Music
- Producers: Grant Nicholas; Matt Sime

Feeder chronology
Silent Cry (2008)	Renegades (2010)	Generation Freakshow (2012)

Singles from Renegades
- 1. "Call Out" Released: 14 June 2010; 2. "Renegades" Released: 23 August 2010; 3. "Down to the River / This Town" Released: 6 December 2010

Renegades is the seventh studio album by Welsh rock band Feeder. It was released on 5 July 2010. It was the first in a proposed series of two albums to be released in 2010 by the band, before its follow-up was delayed until 2012. It is also the first studio album not to be released on The Echo Label, and also their first since 2002's Comfort In Sound not to feature drummer Mark Richardson, who left the band the previous year.

The album features a heavier musical style reminiscent of the band's 1997 debut studio album Polythene, and features primarily electric guitars, abandoning acoustic-driven songs that dominated their previous two albums. The album was promoted in early 2010 with a series of gigs under the name Renegades, with the shows serving to showcase songs that would be on the new album. The name change was done as Grant Nicholas considered it to be "a band within Feeder" and therefore wished to avert expectations from fans for the band to play their older hit songs.

The album was a commercial failure, charting at number 16, making it the first time since their 1997 debut Polythene that the band failed to reach the top 10 with a new studio album. "Call Out", "Renegades", "This Town" and "Down to the River" were all released as singles, with the last two released as a double A-sided set.

A series of photos consisting of Feeder's fans were included in the album's inlay artwork. Each fan was asked to send in a picture of themselves wearing a Renegades T-shirt behind a white background.

On 24 March 2017 the album was reissued with seven bonus tracks including "Side by Side" which was released on compact disc and to streaming services for the first time ever after being a digital download only charity single in 2011.

== Recording and production ==
The album was recorded in Monnow Valley Studio, Rockfield, South Wales for most of 2009. Before the band headed to the studio they invited Ben's Brother drummer Karl Brazil to help the band on drums alongside Mexicolas drummer Tim Trotter, who appears on the Renegades EP track "Time Goes By" alongside the album tracks "White Lines" and "Down to the River". 25 songs were recorded with 12 of these appearing on this album, other tracks appeared on the two Renegades EP's and also on Generation Freakshow, with the only track from those sessions being "Tiny Minds".

== Critical response ==
Professional ratings
Review scores
Source	Rating
Clash	8/10 stars
Kerrang!	4/5 stars
NME	2/10 stars
Q	2/5 stars
Rock Sound	6/10 stars
Virgin Music	6/10 stars

The album received mixed reviews from music critics, but still attracted positive ones, such as Kerrang! when they gave it 4/5 citing that if anyone was bored with the band in the past, they don't understand music, while musicOMH, and The Music Fix both awarded it 8/10. Contact Music were also positive in their review, while Q were negative with a 2/5. Max Raymond of MusicOMH however suggested that "Renegades, quite unexpectedly, is one of the best British rock albums you will hear all year". Will Dean of BBC Online did not praise the album giving it a mixed response by at first giving "White Lines" high approval before saying keeping each track to 3 minutes makes it look like the band are making excuses before slating the lyrics of "City in a Rut" and duration of "Barking Dogs". He concluded saying the album is only for "the hardcore", a view which was disagreed on by a commenter on the Metacritic page of the album, citing this as “Lazy reviewing”.

BBC Radio Wales made it their "Album of the Week", playing one song from the album every day in the build-up towards its UK release as the album was already released in Japan. It was also the "Editors Choice" on Play.com. NME gave the album a 2/10 before suggesting the band should "quit", and “having the brass neck” to continue to still be recording “uninspiring music“ after over 20 years (the band did not form till 1994).

== Songs ==
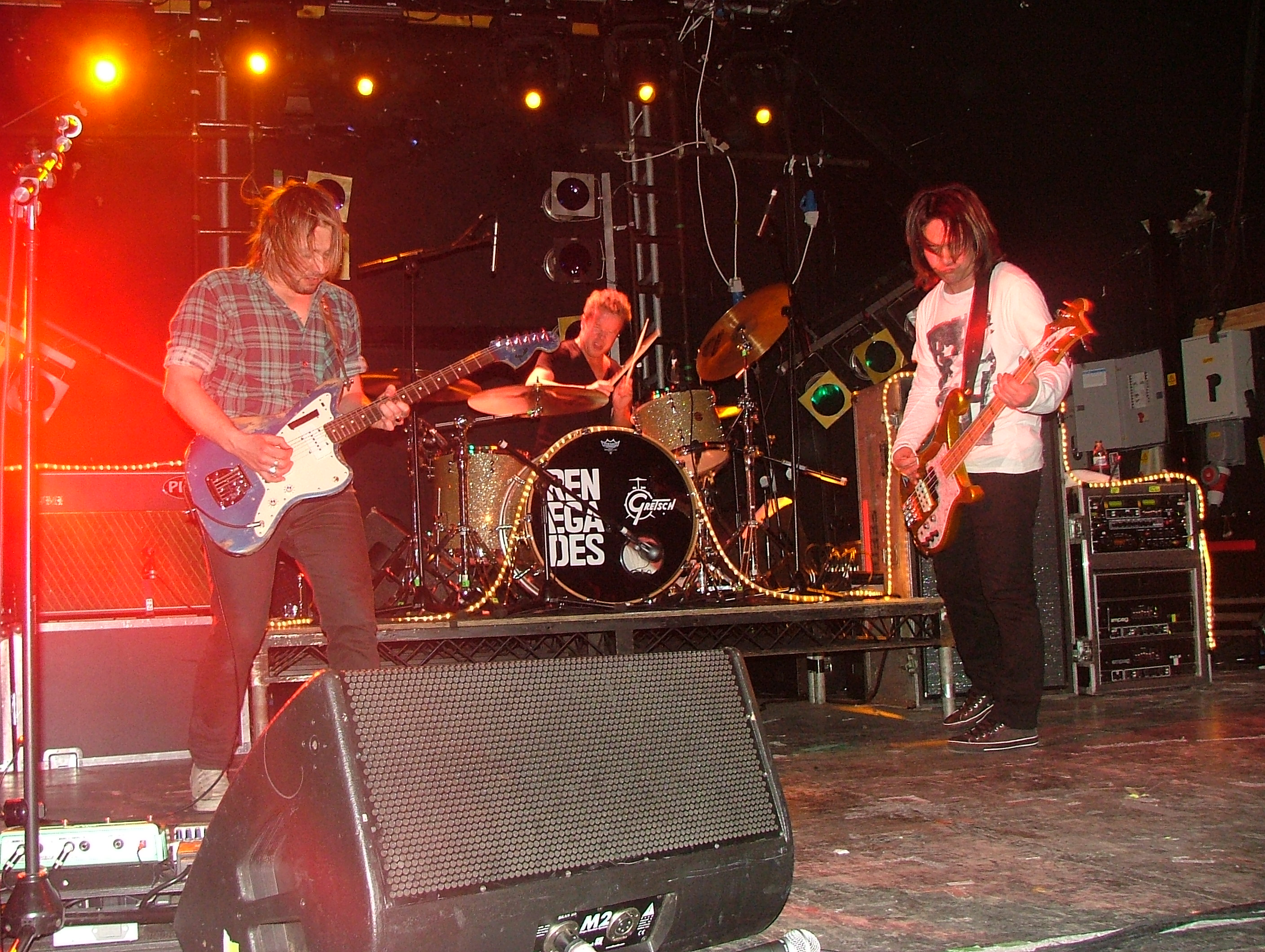
Playing a live gig as Renegades at the Camden Electric Ballroom in April 2010.

Five of the tracks on the album had already been released on the Renegades EPs, including the lead tracks from each EP. "Renegades" was released as a single under the Feeder name, following up the first single "Call Out", which also started life as a Renegades track. "Barking Dogs" was also newly mixed for the album.

== Chart performance and sales ==
Renegades debuted on the UK Albums Chart, at number 16 and sold 8,729 copies making it the first Feeder album since 1997's Polythene to miss the top 10. However, tours in relation to the album were successful, as when the campaign for the album concluded in 2011, Big Teeth Music posted a large profit. Meaning that although the album as a stand-alone package was a commercial failure, many fans who bought the album liked it enough to hear the songs from it played live with many attending multiple shows on each album tour.

== Track listing ==
All tracks are written by Grant Nicholas.

No.	Title	Length
1.	"White Lines"	2:54
2.	"Call Out"	3:27
3.	"Renegades"	3:37
4.	"Sentimental"	2:22
5.	"This Town"	2:57
6.	"Down to the River" (titled "Down By The River" on standard UK CD)	5:23
7.	"Home"	3:11
8.	"Barking Dogs"	2:05
9.	"City in a Rut"	2:51
10.	"Left Foot Right"	2:52
11.	"The End"	3:12

Japanese release bonus tracks
No.	Title	Length
12.	"Godhead" (also available on UK Deluxe Edition, track 11)	3:35
13.	"Fallen"	2:24

2017 reissue bonus tracks
No.	Title	Length
12.	"As Time Goes By"	3:15
13.	"Godhead"	3:34
14.	"In Times of Crisis"	3:31
15.	"All I Ever Wanted"	2:43
16.	"Fallen"	2:22
17.	"Sending out Waves"	2:37
18.	"Side by Side"	3:44

== Personnel ==
Feeder

- Grant Nicholas – guitars, vocals, keyboards, percussion, production
- Taka Hirose – Bass Guitars/Backing Vocals
- Karl Brazil – drums, percussion

Additional personnel

- Tim Trotter – drums on "White Lines", "Down to the River" and "Fallen"

Production

- Matt Sime - production, engineering, mixing on "City in a Rut"
- Chris Sheldon - mixing
- Brian Sperber - mixing on "Renegades" and "Sentimental"
- Tom Manning - assistant engineer
- Ted Jensen - mastering
- Nigel Walton - album sequencing

Artwork

- Nils Leonard - art direction and design
- Dean Sherwood - photography
- Basilio Silva - photography

== Release history ==
It was released in Japan by Victor Entertainment on 30 June 2010, and in the rest of the world through Big Teeth Music on 5 July 2010. Chrysalis, who owned The Echo Label, dealt with the UK distribution of the album.

In late 2012, the album was released on vinyl for the first time via the online Feeder shop vendor Recordstore. This was released as a double gatefold allowing the vinyl of "Generation Freakshow" to be included in the package, which was also sent to the buyer. Early pressings were offered for sale with a Christmas card signed by the band, while enclosed in wrapping paper featuring the band's name.

== Charts ==
Chart (2010)	Peak position
UK Albums Chart	16
UK Rock Albums Chart	1
Japanese Albums Chart	93
