= Tracing Lines / Silent Cry =

Single by Feeder

from the album Silent Cry
- Released: 25 August 2008
- Recorded: 2007
- Genre: Alternative rock, power pop
- Length: 3:47 ("Tracing Lines"); 3:25 ("Silent Cry")
- Label: Echo
- Producers: Grant Nicholas, Feeder

Feeder singles chronology
"We Are the People" (2008)	"Tracing Lines / Silent Cry" (2008)	"Call Out" (2010)

"Tracing Lines" and "Silent Cry" are the double A-side singles from Feeder, and was released on 25 August 2008.

Both songs, "Tracing Lines" and "Silent Cry" are from the band's sixth album, Silent Cry. The single was originally meant to be just "Tracing Lines", released on 11 August 2008 on CD and vinyl editions. However "Silent Cry" was later added along with the announcement that it would be a download-only single.

== Track listing ==
=== Bundle 1 ===
1. Tracing Lines (single edit)
2. Tracing Lines (live from XFM's All-Day Breakfast)
3. Somewhere to Call Your Own
4. Silent Cry

=== Bundle 2 ===
1. Tracing Lines
2. Tracing Lines (Live from XFM's All-Day Breakfast)
3. Silent Cry

=== Bundle 3 ===
1. Tracing Lines (The Crypt sessions)
2. Silent Cry (The Crypt sessions)
3. Tracing Lines (Instrumental)
4. Silent Cry (Instrumental)
