= We Are the People (Feeder song) =

"We are the People"

Single by Feeder

from the album Silent Cry
- Released: 9 June 2008
- Recorded: 2007
- Genre: Alternative rock
- Length: 4:41 (album version); 3:50 (single edit)
- Label: Echo
- Songwriter: Grant Nicholas
- Producers: Grant Nicholas, Feeder

Feeder singles chronology
"Save Us" (2006)	"We are the People" (2008)	"Tracing Lines / Silent Cry" (2008)

"We Are the People" was the first and only top 40 single from Feeder's sixth studio album, Silent Cry. The single was released on 9 June 2008, receiving its first radio play on Kerrang! Radio, two months before on 14 April. It charted at #25 in the UK becoming Feeder's landmark 20th top 40 single, but also their last to date after follow-up "Tracing Lines / Silent Cry" missed the top 200 alongside being their least successful lead single from any of their albums since 1999. "We Are the People" is also the first Feeder single since 1997's "Crash", to miss the BBC Radio 1 playlist and also the first of their singles since that one to only spend one week on the UK top 75. It was included on XFM's top 100 tracks of 2008 list.

We are the People is a song about change and unity in the world we live in... it's like a call to arms but in a positive and non-violent way. It's time for change and only we the people can do that... I wanted the song to be anthemic and sonically uplifting...

— Grant Nicholas.

Although the single made No.2 on the physical sales chart, this was already at a time when artists rarely released CD singles and sales were already declining making a very small percentage of the sales market. The physical chart was already irrelevant as a result and was not seen as a top ten single by the band nor fans.

== Composition ==
The album version ends with a coda entitled "We are One" which according to a US promo CD from February 2008 was meant to be a standalone track on what was to become Silent Cry. The single edit fades out before this section begins and shortens some of the instrumental sections after the second chorus.

== Music video ==
London-based radio station XFM, ran a competition for an extra to appear in the video. The winner had to be available at a London West End address, with the details disclosed to them. In a blog posted by the bands then drummer Mark Richardson on their official website, it was revealed the director used the traditional blue screen chroma key technique (also used for the "Feeling a Moment" video).

The video involves a mysterious hooded character, their face hidden in darkness. At the beginning of the video the mysterious character walks past singer Grant Nicholas, from this point Grant disappears and the person in the hood displays the face of Grant Nicholas. As the video goes on, he continues to display the faces of everyone whom the mysterious character walks past (these people also vanish as they walk past the hooded figure), the faces constantly change as the character sings. The video ends with this hooded figure throwing all the faces in the air as he watches them float to the ground as if made from paper, the face of Grant Nicholas floats to the ground at the end of the video. Bassist Taka Hirose and Mark also make an appearance. The video received heavy criticism from fans, while the band were according to fan gossip not happy with it.

The Video is directed by David Mould. Some of the people who made an appearance within the video were competition winners, including some who knew the band through working for them at the time.

== Track listing ==
=== CD ===
1. "We are the People" (single edit) - 3:50
2. "Calling Out for Days" - 3:16

=== 7" #1 ===
1. "We are the People" (single edit) - 3:50
2. "Calling Out for Days" - 3:16

=== 7" #2 ===
1. "We are the People" (single edit) - 3:50
2. "Somewhere to Call Your Own" - 2:31

=== EP (iTunes) ===
1. "We are the People" (single edit) - 3:50
2. "We are the People" (extended version) - 4:46
3. "We are the People" (acoustic version) - 3:54
