= Yesterday Went Too Soon =

Studio album by Feeder
- Released: 30 August 1999
- Recorded: 1998–1999
- Genre: Alternative rock; post-grunge; post-Britpop; indie rock
- Length: 57:19
- Label: Echo
- Producer: Feeder

Feeder chronology
Polythene (1997)	Yesterday Went Too Soon (1999)	Another Yesterday (2000)

Singles from Yesterday Went Too Soon
- 1. "Day In Day Out" Released: 22 March 1999; 2. "Insomnia" Released: 31 May 1999; 3. "Yesterday Went Too Soon" Released: 9 August 1999; 4. "Paperfaces" Released: 20 November 1999

Professional ratings
Review scores
Source	Rating
AllMusic	2/5 stars

Yesterday Went Too Soon is the second studio album by Welsh rock band Feeder. It was released on 30 August 1999 on The Echo Label.

Yesterday Went Too Soon entered the UK charts at #8, after a decent amount of critical success. The title track gave them their first top 20 single, and the album would in total give the band 4 top 50 hits. Its critical and cult appeal including slots on Top of the Pops for the first time, enabled the album to aid the band's breakthrough which was completed on the follow-up Echo Park.

The album gained a Silver certification in April 2001, shortly before the release of breakthrough album Echo Park, and then went Gold in March 2003 after the extended commercial recognition of Comfort In Sound, thus making the album an overdue commercial success sales-wise.

Despite the band's American breakthrough with single "High" and extensive touring in the States, Yesterday Went Too Soon was never released in the US. Promotional copies of the album were released by the band's former US label Elektra, but they would ultimately turn down the album for distribution.

== Charts and sales ==
When the album was released, the band's reputation was on the rise and it entered the UK albums chart at number eight, which was at the time an unexpected chart position for the band. Before that, the band had released the album's first single, "Day In Day Out", in March 1999 which charted at #31 followed by "Insomnia" at #22, resulting in their first appearance on Top of the Pops. A week before the album's release, the band played the main stage of the Reading and Leeds festivals, while the title track from the album was at #20 in the singles chart. The album was then released on 30 August 1999. Only one single was lifted from the album after its release, in which a re-recorded version of "Paperfaces" charted at #41.

The album was Melody Maker's #24 album of 1999, while Metal Hammer placed the album in at #6 and Kerrang! ranked it at #16.

== Background ==
The band decided to self-produce the album, brought in Matt Sime for engineering duties and had the album mixed in New York by Andy Wallace.

The working title for the album was originally A Life Through Headphones, and was originally set to be a double album. The name change was due to former Take That singer Robbie Williams releasing his solo debut album Life Thru a Lens, with the band not wanting to be compared to him.

The album was written and recorded during and before the band's US tour of 1998. Before they left the UK, some demos were recorded with a few completed into final recordings, with some of these featuring on their single "Suffocate" as B-sides. "Dry" on CD2 of the single was later made into a full band version, as opposed to the acoustic recording found on the single.

Some of the album's lyrical themes were derived from Grant's personal perspective of working in a menial supermarket job ("Day in Day Out"), his experiences after gigs on their US tour ("Insomnia" and "You're My Evergreen"), past relationships (the title track and "Dry"), the music industry ("Hole in My Head") and "fear of commitment in relationships" ("Anaesthetic") amongst others. Musically, the album employed an indie rock feel to it, which also featured extended appearances of an acoustic guitar on some of its tracks.

"Dry" was re-recorded as a full band version after the original acoustic version appeared on "Suffocate" as a b-side. That single's b-sides featured tracks from the sessions for that album, therefore revealing what sort of direction it would take on.

The album was due for release in June 1999, but this was delayed to include material written after its completion which the band felt was too good to leave off.

Cover artwork and images for the album and related singles were photographed by Rick Guest in the grounds of the recently decommissioned RAF Ash in Kent.

== Accolades ==
- #6 on Metal Hammer's 1999 list (the highest placing from a UK act that year).
- #24 on Melody Maker's 1999 list.
- #16 on Kerrang's 1999 list.
- #73 in Kerrang! magazines "Top 100 British Rock Albums of All Time" list.
- Maxim and Loaded's- "Album of The Month".

== Track listing ==
All tracks are written by Grant Nicholas.

No.	Title	Length
1.	"Anaesthetic"	3:50
2.	"Insomnia"	2:54
3.	"Picture of Perfect Youth"	3:46
4.	"Yesterday Went Too Soon"	4:20
5.	"Waiting for Changes"	2:44
6.	"Radioman"	3:37
7.	"Day In Day Out"	3:39
8.	"Tinsel Town"	4:29
9.	"You're My Evergreen"	3:24
10.	"Dry"	4:24
11.	"Hole in My Head" (omitted from Japanese pressings)	2:58
12.	"So Well"	4:03
13.	"Paperfaces" ("Paperfaces" ends at 4:28, hidden track "Bubblehead" starts at 9:30-9:35, "Bubblehead" omitted from bonus track versions)	13:21

Japanese release bonus tracks
No.	Title	Length
13.	"I Need a Buzz"	2:50
14.	"Can't Dance to Disco"	3:01

Korean release bonus track
No.	Title	Length
14.	"High"	4:33

iTunes and Spotify digital releases + Sony re-issue
No.	Title	Length
13.	"Paperfaces"	4:29
14.	"Bubblehead"	3:53

== Personnel ==
Feeder

- Grant Nicholas – guitar, vocals, keyboards on "Dry"
- Taka Hirose – bass guitar
- Jon Henry Lee – drums, percussion

Additional personnel

- Audrey Riley – string arrangements on "Yesterday Went Too Soon" and "Dry"
- Matt Sime – engineering
- Andy Wallace – mixing
- Al Clay – mixing on "Yesterday Went Too Soon" and "Hole in my Head", additional engineering on "Hole in my Head"
- George Marino – mastering
- Rick Guest – photography

== UK chart performance ==
UK Album Chart
Week	01	02	03
Position	8	24	43
