= Polythene (album) =

Studio album by Feeder
- Released: 19 May 1997
- Recorded: Mid 1996
- Genre: Alternative rock; grunge; post-grunge
- Length: 51:03
- Label: Echo (UK); Elektra (US)
- Producer: Chris Sheldon; Feeder

Feeder chronology
Swim (1996)	Polythene (1997)	Yesterday Went Too Soon (1999)

Singles from Polythene
- 1. "Stereo World" Released: 7 October 1996; 2. "Tangerine" Released: 27 January 1997; 3. "Cement" Released: 28 April 1997; 4. "Crash" Released: 11 August 1997; 5. "High" Released: 6 October 1997

Polythene is the debut studio album by Welsh rock band Feeder. It was released 19 May 1997 on the Echo Label, and then re-issued on 28 October in the same year in an Enhanced CD version, featuring their UK top 40 breakthrough single "High" and its video. The original version of the album was deleted soon after and is relatively rare due to this reason.

Despite sizeable critical success, the album had minor commercial success, charting at number 65 in the UK albums chart. However, Polythene would later achieve Gold record status despite never having appeared in the top 50 of the album charts, a rare feat reflecting steady and consistent sales over a period of 20 years, rather than strong initial sales.

The album saw the group's early take on a more grunge-influenced sound, which was not seen on their other albums that followed. Many critics at the time called the band the UK's answer to the Smashing Pumpkins.

In April 1998, a VHS compilation of the music videos for the album's singles was released, titled Polythene: The Video Singles.

== Background ==
Polythene's working title was Here in the Bubble.

Prior to the release of Polythene, Feeder had released several singles, which helped them build a cult following.

The album carries over two tracks – "Descend" and "Stereo World" – from Feeder's earlier EP, Swim.

== Music ==
The music on Polythene is considered to be softer than much of the post-grunge music being made in 1997. American Songwriter said: "Feeder took the post-grunge sound and turned it into something ethereal and almost hypnotic."

== Reception ==
Professional ratings
Review scores
Source	Rating
AllMusic	4/5 stars
Metal Hammer	10/10 stars
Q	4/5 stars
Kerrang!	4/5 stars

"Waterfall"
"Waterfall" was rejected from the album for the re-issue which included breakthrough "High", but has the "grunge" sound contained in the album.

The band's second single off Polythene, "Cement" was given a 5/5 review rating by Kerrang!, and their "Single of the Week" accolade. The album itself was ranked 6th in the magazine's best albums of the year chart. Metal Hammer voted it the best album of 1997 in its end of year critic's poll.

Kerrang! later included Polythene in their 200 Albums For the Year 2000 list in the "Essential Britrock" category. It appeared at number 87 in an early 2005 Kerrang! magazine vote, ranking the top 100 British rock albums of all-time.

== Accolades ==
Publication	Country	Accolade	Year	Rank
Metal Hammer	UK	Top Twenty Albums of the Year	1997	1
Kerrang!	UK	Top Twenty Albums of the Year	1997	6
Kerrang!	UK	The 100 Best British Rock Albums Ever!	2005	87

== Track listing ==
All tracks are written by Grant Nicholas.

No.	Title	Length
1.	"Polythene Girl"	3:29
2.	"My Perfect Day"	4:25
3.	"Cement"	3:17
4.	"Crash"	4:08
5.	"Radiation"	4:38
6.	"Suffocate"	3:53
7.	"Descend"	5:19
8.	"Stereo World"	3:24
9.	"Tangerine"	3:58
10.	"Waterfall"	3:10
11.	"Forgive"	4:41
12.	"20th Century Trip"	1:56
Total length:		46:30

Re-release 20 October 1997
No.	Title	Length
1.	"Polythene Girl"	3:25
2.	"My Perfect Day"	4:25
3.	"Cement"	3:17
4.	"High"	4:33
5.	"Crash"	4:08
6.	"Radiation"	4:38
7.	"Suffocate"	3:53
8.	"Descend"	5:19
9.	"Stereo World"	3:27
10.	"Change"	3:23
11.	"Tangerine"	3:58
12.	"Forgive"	4:41
13.	"20th Century Trip"	1:56
Total length:		51:04

Japanese release bonus tracks
No.	Title	Length
14.	"Chicken on a Bone"	3:46
15.	"Here in the Bubble"	4:24
16.	"Swim"	3:19
Total length:		57:57

- The album was reissued on 20 October 1997 with Polythene Girl being replaced with a remix by Chris Sheldon, non album single "High" was added to the track listing as track 4 and Waterfall was removed and replaced by Change as track 10 between "Stereo World" and "Tangerine"

== Personnel ==
Feeder

- Grant Nicholas - vocals, guitar, production on "Polythene Girl", "My Perfect Day" and "Crash", concept, photography
- Taka Hirose - bass guitar
- Jon Lee - drums

Production

- Chris Sheldon - production, mixing, engineering
- Feeder - production on "Cement"
- Brian Sperber - production, engineering and mixing on "Polythene Girl", "My Perfect Day" and "Crash", remix on "Cement"
- Audrey Riley - string arrangements on "High"
- Matt Sime - engineering, mixing on "High"
- Steve Power - mixing, additional engineering on "High"
- Howie Weinberg - mastering

Artwork

- Jeremy Plumb - concept, design
- Scarlet Page - photography
- Dan McLewin - photography
- Andrew Cameron - photography
