= Crash (Feeder song) =

Single by Feeder

from the album Polythene
- Released: 11 August 1997
- Genre: Grunge, post-grunge
- Length: 4:10
- Label: Echo
- Songwriter: Grant Nicholas
- Producers: Grant Nicholas, Chris Sheldon

Feeder singles chronology
| "Cement" (1997) | "Crash" (1997) | "High" (1997) |

"Crash" was the third single from Feeder's critically acclaimed 1997 album Polythene.

It made number 48 in mid-August of the same year, giving Feeder their first top-50 hit despite the band still yet to appear on Radio 1's playlist at the time. The song refers to a relationship.

The B-side "Here In The Bubble" was a working title for the Polythene album, which leads to many fans wondering if this track would have been on the album had the original title of the same name stayed. Also on the single is an acoustic version of the album track "Forgive".

An accompanying music video with the band in a quarry was directed by Stuart Gosling.

== Critical reception ==
Kerrang! referred to the song as "one of the finest slices of pop-coated rock you could ever wish to hear", and rated the single "KKKK" (four stars out of five), further noting that the full single was another of "Grant Nicholas' big-booted, gorgeously bruised stompers" and commented "one wonders what you have to do to get played on Radio 1 these days". HMV promoted the single with a press advertisement in Kerrang! on 16 August 1997. Nonetheless, by the time of the advertisement, HMV had banned Feeder from playing live in their stores after hundreds of fans crowd surfed during the song when the band performed the song during a brief set at the Portsmouth HMV branch on 11 August, which was the second performance of their HMV brief acoustic set tour to promote the single which had begun earlier that day in Southampton. As Kerrang! reported, more than 300 fans came to see the band perform the song, but as the record store bosses were displeased with the crowd surfing, and when the band travelled to the Bristol HMV the following day as their next in their promotional tour, they were told they could sign autographs but not perform live at any HMV branch again.

== Track listing ==
=== CD1 (Blue edition) ===
1. "Crash" (radio mix) - 4:10 *
2. "Here In The Bubble" - 4:27
3. "Forgive" (acoustic) - 4:02
4. "Stereo World" (video)

=== CD2 (Orange Edition) ===
1. "Crash" (radio mix) - 4:10 *
2. "Undivided" - 4:07
3. "Swim" (alternative version) *
4. "Tangerine" (video)

=== 7" vinyl (clear) ===
1. "Crash" (album version) - 4:10
2. "Here In The Bubble" - 4:27
- The radio mix of "Crash" was not exactly the same as the ones as on the promo CDs sent to radio stations. There were two different edits on the promos- one that eased up at an earlier place to end, and one that had the first few seconds cut off with the full ending.
- This version of "Swim" is the same one as on the "Swim" mini-album, only that the first few seconds of the song do not fade-in with the fade-out of "Shade", this is cut off the version on this single so there is no fade-in at the beginning.

== Chart performances ==
| Chart (1997) | Peak position |
|---|---|
| UK Singles (Official Charts) | 48 |
