= Cement (song) =

1997 single by Feeder

Single by Feeder

from the album Polythene
- Released: 28 April 1997
- Genre: Grunge; post-grunge
- Length: 3:18
- Label: Echo
- Songwriter(s): Grant Nicholas
- Producer(s): Grant Nicholas, Chris Sheldon

Feeder singles chronology
"Tangerine" (1997)	"Cement" (1997)	"Crash" (1997)

"Cement" is the second single from British rock band Feeder's critically acclaimed 1997 album Polythene. In addition to reaching number 53 on the UK Singles Chart, it also charted at number 31 on the US Billboard Mainstream Rock chart.

== Critical reception ==
The song was released to a very favourable critical reception. Kerrang! rated the single their highest rating of "KKKKK", meaning five stars out of five. They described the song as "haunting, hooky and heavy, in a creepy twisted sort of way" and said that, along with their previous single "Stereo World", the band had "combined the universes of rock credibility and pop sensibility to bit on the perfect single formula". They further noted that the song "grabs you and sends you" and is "gorgeous". In 2005, the same magazine included the song in its list of the band's "Past Glories"−an eight song list of the band's "classic moments"−where they referred to the song as a "pristine post-grunge single" and "a criminally forgotten Feeder classic". In the same month, Drowned in Sound commented the song, along with "Buck Rogers", had "drive" and "passion".

== Music video ==
The music video for Cement was directed by Jon Klien and is set almost entirely in a grimy, dimly-lit bedroom set with windows similar to those seen in the Death Star in the Star Wars films. It flashes between band performance and frontman Grant Nicholas indulging in various unhinged, obsessive activities relating to his love interest in the video which loosely relate to the song's lyrics. This includes spying on the girl with a camera as she walks down the street and constructing a model of her, which (in his mind at least) comes to life, and hand-peeling the shell off an egg.

== B-sides ==
Amongst the singles' B-sides are re-recordings of the two tracks from their debut release, "Two Colours", while "Rush" was at first a studio demo before the released version is a "live" take, which was recorded in a studio with the crowd effects added afterwards. It was originally recorded for a compilation called Home Truths. This was also their first coloured vinyl release. The song refers to “sexual obsession”.

== Track listings ==
CD1

1. "Cement" – 3:18
2. "Chicken on a Bone" (1997 version) – 3:45
3. "Forgiven" – 4:40

CD2

1. "Cement" – 3:18
2. "Pictures of Pain" (1997 version) – 3:46
3. "Rush" (live) – 3:46

7-inch red vinyl single

1. "Cement" – 3:18
2. "Pictures of Pain" (1997 version) – 3:46

== Charts ==
Chart (1997–1998)	Peak position
Scotland (OCC)	67
UK Singles (OCC)	53
US Mainstream Rock (Billboard)	31

== Release history ==
Region	Date	Format(s)	Label(s)	Ref.
United Kingdom	28 April 1997	7-inch vinyl; CD	Echo	
United States	19 January 1998	Alternative radio	Elektra	
