= Tangerine (Feeder song) =

1997 song by Feeder

Single by Feeder

from the album Polythene
- Released: 27 January 1997
- Recorded: late 1996
- Genre: Grunge, alternative metal
- Length: 3:55
- Label: Echo
- Songwriters: Grant Nicholas, Taka Hirose, Jon Lee
- Producers: Grant Nicholas, Chris Sheldon

Feeder singles chronology
"Stereo World" (1996)	"Tangerine" (1997)	"Cement" (1997)

"Tangerine" is a song by British rock band Feeder, released as the band's second single, and the first that was taken from the Polythene album. The single managed to gain word-of-mouth success and made #60 on the UK top 75- their first of 25 hit singles to date.

The song is featured on the original Gran Turismo game as an instrumental. Grant once said that the song is about the struggles the band experienced while trying to get a record contract.

During the 2020 Covid lockdown, a radio presenter living in Bath, discovered during a clear out of his attic and shed, a series of master tapes containing acoustic radio sessions he did with various established and up and coming bands. Amongst these was an early performance of b-side “Rain” performed in 1997, sometime before this single was released.

== Music video ==
The music video (directed by Toby Duckett) begins with a first person camera sequence of being let in by a doorman to a squat known as Oddballs Hall. The now demolished building at the junction of Harrow Rd and Ladbroke Grove in London where Feeder are performing in a dingy hall which features rats, several arcade machines, a giant fiberglass wolf head and a man in a bathtub filled with tangerines. One end of the hall was covered with mirrors which were smashed for effect during the filming but the process proved to be too dangerous to all concerned so does not appear in the finished piece. Several slow-motion sequences occur during the performance in which tangerines fly at the band as they leap through the air, drummer Jon Lee's bass drum is also filled with tangerines. In keeping with the orange-based image of the song (and of the band at the time) the band wear several orange items of clothing during the video, including their then-trademark orange jumpsuits. At the end of the performance the camera returns to first person, leaves the building and returns to the street. The doorman and the dog were residents, everyone else that appears are crew, all the filming was done in a single day and was shot on 72mm film.

== Track listing ==
CD1

1. "Tangerine" – 3:55
2. "Rhubarb" – 2:07
3. "Rain" – 3:27

CD2

1. "Tangerine" – 3:55
2. "TV Me" – 3:28
3. "Elegy" – 4:13

7" vinyl

1. "Tangerine" – 3:55
2. "Rhubarb" – 2:07
