= The Echo Label discography =

The following is a list of music releases on The Echo Label. From late 2008, the label ceased trading as a record company and became only a legal entity to maintain copyrights on existing releases, which means the following list can be seen as complete.

The most successful artists on their roster were Feeder, Moloko and Babybird, Moloko became the only artist of theirs to achieve a number one album anywhere in the world, when Statues reached that position in Flanders. They are also the only artist to get an IFPI sales award when the album passed 500,000 units in Europe, certifying it gold and the first artist of theirs to get a UK platinum certification by the BPI when their previous album Things to Make and Do reached the required 300,000 unit shipments in 2000, and took six months from the release date to do so. Feeder on the other hand became the only artist on the Echo roster to gain two platinum awards in the UK when Comfort in Sound and Echo Park both picked up the sales certificates in 2003, they later went on in 2006 to pick up their third when The Singles became the first Echo album to go platinum in less than three months- the first quarter of the album's debut year from its release date. Although Moloko had the highest-placed single in the UK charts when "The Time is Now" made number two in 2000 (kept off the top spot by Melanie C and Lisa Left-Eye Lopes with "Never Be the Same Again"), Feeder arguably have the most well-known single release on Echo's roster. "Buck Rogers" reached number five in January 2001, making it their first ever top 10 single and has over the years become an XFM and UK summer music festival anthem. Feeder have now formed their own label Big Teeth Music for domestic releases, and are still signed to their Japanese label Victor. Moloko on the other hand split in 2006. Their first artist on the label to achieve gold sales was that of Babybird for their album Ugly Beautiful in 1996, while its signature single "You're Gorgeous" became the only ever single on the label to gain gold sales, when it passed the required 400,000 in the UK. The only other certified singles are Moloko's "Sing it Back" and "The Time Is Now", both of which have been certified Silver, marking sales of 200,000.

In the fall of 2017, The Echo Label acquired the catalogues of Ash, Deichkind, DevilDriver, Thomas Dolby, Megadeth, Sigue Sigue Sputnik, The Subways, Supergrass, and White Town from Warner Music Group.

== The Echo numbering system ==
Nearly all Echo releases start with the prefix EC with a following H for albums and an S for singles, though due to the number of formats for each release, each different media has additional characters in the catalogue number.

This is the format used for each different type of media:

- CD Album - ECHCD (for a limited or double-disc version of a CD album ECHCX is used)
- CD + DVD Album - ECHDV
- Vinyl LP - ECHLP
- Cassette Album - ECHMC
- SACD Album - ECHSACD
- 7" Single - ECS (where there is a second 7" format ECSX is used)
- 10" Single - ECST
- 12" Single - ECSY (where there is a second 12" format ECSYX is used)
- CD single - ECSCD
- Maxi CD - ECSCX (commonly used when a second CD format is present)
- Cassette Single - ECSMC

== Catalogue ==
=== Albums ===
No.	Year	Artist	Title	UK Albums Chart
ECH 1	1994	Julian Cope	Autogeddon	16
ECH 2	1994	.O.rang	Herd of Instinct	
ECH 3	1995	Anne Dudley	Ancient and Modern	
ECH 4	1995	Nyack	11 Track Player	
ECH 5	1995	Julian Cope	20 Mothers	20
ECH 6	1995	Melanie Garside	Fossil	
ECH 7	1995	Moloko	Do You Like My Tight Sweater?	92
ECH 8	1996	Denim	Denim on Ice	
ECH 9	1996	Feeder	Swim	
ECH 10	1996	.O.rang	Fields and Waves	
ECH 11	1996	Babybird	Ugly Beautiful	9
ECH 12	1996	Julian Cope	Interpreter	39
ECH 13	1996	Subcircus	Carousel (Promo sampler)	
ECH 14	1996	Subcircus	Carousel	
ECH 15	1997	Feeder	Polythene	65
ECH 16	1997	D'Influence	London	56
ECH 17	1997	Mono	Formica Blues	71
ECH 18	1997	Subcircus	Carousel (Re-issue)	
ECH 19	1997	Feeder	Polythene (Re-issue)	80
ECH 20	1998	George Martin	In My Life	5
ECH 21	1998	Moloko	I Am Not a Doctor	64
ECH 22	1998	Lhooq	Lhooq	
ECH 23	1998	Fuzz Townshend	(Unreleased album)	
ECH 24	1998	Babybird	There's Something Going On	28
ECH 27	1998	D'Influence	London (Re-issue)	
ECH 28	1999	Feeder	Yesterday Went Too Soon	8
ECH 29	1999	Subcircus	Are You Receiving?	
ECH 30	2000	Big Yoga Muffin	Wherever You Go, There You Are	
ECH 31	2000	Moloko	Things to Make and Do	3
ECH 32	2000	Babybird	Bugged	104
ECH 33	2000	Utah Saints	Two	
ECH 34	2001	Feeder	Echo Park	5
ECH 35	2001	Dark Flower	Feed My Soul	
ECH 36	2001	Spek	Don't Sweat the Small Stuff	
ECH 37	2001	Moloko	All Back to the Mine	149
ECH 38	2001	Feeder	Swim (Re-issue)	91
ECH 39	2001	Various Artists	Karma Lounge: Chilled Global Beats	
ECH 42	2002	Various Artists	Karma Lounge 2: The Global Listening Experience	
ECH 43	2002	Feeder	Comfort in Sound	6
ECH 44	2003	Moloko	Statues	18
ECH 46	2003	I Am Kloot	I Am Kloot	68
ECH 49	2003	Various Artists	Acupunture Rocks	
ECH 50	2004	The Stands	All Years Leaving	28
ECH 51	2004	Babybird	Best of Babybird	
ECH 52	2004	Feeder	Picture of Perfect Youth	65
ECH 54	2004	Various Artists	Soundtrack	22^{[I]}
ECH 55	2004	Engineers	Folly	18^{[II]}
ECH 57	2004	Ray LaMontagne	Trouble	137
ECH 59	2004	The Vacation	Band From World War Zero	
ECH 60	2005	Feeder	Pushing the Senses	2
ECH 61	2005	Engineers	Engineers	84
ECH 62	2005	I Am Kloot	Gods and Monsters	74
ECH 63	2005	Róisín Murphy	Ruby Blue	88
ECH 64	2005	The Stands	Horse Fabulous	62
ECH 65	2005	Morcheeba	The Antidote	17
ECH 66	2005	Various Artists	An Echo Sampler (Promo)	
ECH 67	2005	Black Rebel Motorcycle Club	Howl	14
ECH 69	2006	Feeder	The Singles	2
ECH 70	2006	Moloko	Catalogue	82
ECH 72	2006	Bat for Lashes	Fur and Gold	156
ECH 73	2007	Rosalie Deighton	21 Days	
ECH 74	2007	Steven Lindsay	Kite	
ECH 75	2007	Forever Like Red	Distance	
ECH 76	2007	Jacob Golden	Revenge Songs	
ECH 77	2007	Morcheeba	Dive Deep	59
ECH 78	2007	Sarabeth Tucek	Sarabeth Tucek	
ECH 79	2008	Feeder	Silent Cry	8
ECH 81	2009	Brendan Benson	My Old Familiar Friend	90
ECH 83	2009	Nerina Pallot	The Graduate	46
BMGCAT239DLP	2018	DevilDriver	The Fury of Our Maker's Hand	

- I UK Compilations Chart
- II UK Budget Albums Chart

=== Singles & EPs ===
No.	Year	Artist	Title	UK Singles Chart
ECS 1	1994	Zu	The Apart EP	
ECS 3	1994	Nyack	Savage Smile EP	
ECS 4	1994	Julian Cope	Paranormal in the West Country EP	
ECS 6	1994	.O.rang	Spoor EP	
ECS 7	1995	Nyack	I'm Your Star	
ECS 8	1995	Moloko	Moloko EP	
ECS 10	1996	Melanie Garside	Big White Room	182
ECS 11	1995	Julian Cope	Try Try Try EP	24
ECS 12	1995	Moloko	Fun For Me	
ECS 13	1995	Feeder	Two Colours	178
ECS 15	1995	Anne Dudley	Veni Emmanuel	
ECS 16	1996	Moloko	Dominoid	65
ECS 17	1996	Denim	It Fell Off the Back of a Lorry	89
ECS 18	1996	Melanie Garside	She Knows	118
ECS 20	1996	Moloko	Fun For Me (Re-issue)	36
ECS 21	1996	Melanie Garside	Has and to Do (withdrawn)	
ECS 22	1996	Julian Cope	I Come From Another Planet, Baby	34
ECS 23	1996	Mono	Life in Mono	
ECS 24	1996	Babybird	Goodnight	28
ECS 25	1996	Julian Cope	Planetary Sit-In (Every Girl Has Your Name)	34
ECS 26	1996	Babybird	You're Gorgeous	3
ECS 27	1996	Feeder	Stereo World	128
ECS 29	1996	.O.rang	P53 (Remix)	
ECS 30	1997	Subcircus	86'd	88
ECS 31	1997	Babybird	Candy Girl	14
ECS 32	1997	Feeder	Tangerine	60
ECS 33	1997	Babybird	Cornershop	37
ECS 34	1997	Subcircus	You Love You	61
ECS 35	1997	Mono	Silicone	
ECS 36	1997	Feeder	Cement	53
ECS 37	1997	D'Influence	Shake It	
ECS 40	1997	Mono	Slimcea Girl	145
ECS 41	1997	D'Influence	Hypnotize	33
ECS 42	1997	Feeder	Crash	48
ECS 43	1997	Subcircus	86'd (Re-issue)	56
ECS 44	1997	Feeder	High	24
ECS 45	1997	D'Influence	Magic	45
ECS 46	1997	Fuzz Townshend	Hello Darlin'	51
ECS 47	1998	Fuzz Townshend	Smash It	86
ECS 48	1998	Mono	High Life	101
ECS 49	1998	Funky People	Funky Music	
ECS 50	1998	D'Influence	Falling	
ECS 51	1998	Lhooq	Losing Hand	
ECS 52	1998	Feeder	Suffocate	37
ECS 53	1998	Fuzz Townshend	Tasty Big Ed	129
ECS 54	1998	Moloko	The Flipside	53
ECS 56	1998	D'Influence	Rock With You	30
ECS 57	1998	Lhooq	I Don't Want to Know	
ECS 58	1998	Marc Almond	Black Kiss	97
ECS 60	1998	Babybird	Bad Old Man	31
ECS 61	1998	G-Force	The Discovery EP	
ECS 64	1998	Mono	Life in Mono (re-issue)	60
ECS 65	1998	Babybird	If You'll Be Mine	28
ECS 67	1998	Lhooq	Lhooq (Promo sampler)	
ECS 68	1998	Fuzz Townshend	Get Yerself	156
ECS 71	1999	Moloko	Sing It Back	45
ECS 73	1999	Babybird	Back Together (Remix)	22
ECS 75	1999	Feeder	Day In Day Out	31
ECS 77	1999	Feeder	Insomnia	22
ECS 78	1999	Subcircus	Do You Feel Loved	101
ECS 79	1999	Feeder	Yesterday Went Too Soon	20
ECS 80	1999	Subcircus	For Those Who Cannot Weep	
ECS 81	2000	Fred & Roxy	Something for the Weekend	36
ECS 82	1999	Moloko	Sing It Back	4
ECS 83	2000	Utah Saints	Love Song	37
ECS 84	2000	Pranksters	Hot Hot Hot	
ECS 85	1999	Feeder	Paperfaces	41
ECS 86	2000	Subcircus	60 Second Love Affair	
ECS 87	1999	Big Yoga Muffin	Episode 1: 845183	
ECS 88	2000	Moloko	The Time Is Now	2
ECS 91	2000	Big Yoga Muffin	Episode 2: Is That How You Get Off?	135
ECS 92	2000	Babybird	The F-Word	35
ECS 93	2001	Dark Flower	Love Will Bring Us Back Together	180
ECS 94	2000	Fred & Roxy	Ten Times More (withdrawn)	
ECS 96	2000	Utah Saints	Funky Music	23
ECS 97	2000	Babybird	Out of Sight	58
ECS 99	2000	Moloko	Pure Pleasure Seeker	21
ECS 100	2000	Big Yoga Muffin	Bordom Is a Luxury	129
ECS 101	2000	TBC...	Something About You	
ECS 102	2000	666	D.E.V.I.L.	18
ECS 103	2000	Utah Saints	Power to the Beats	
ECS 104	2000	Moloko	Indigo	51
ECS 105	2001	Utah Saints	Lost Vagueness	111
ECS 106	2001	Feeder	Buck Rogers	5
ECS 107	2001	Feeder	Seven Days in the Sun	14
ECS 109	2001	Mr. Phillips	7th Day (I Will Be There)	
ECS 110	2001	Spek	I'm a Hippie	91
ECS 111	2000	BYM	Episode 4: Decorate My Rut	
ECS 112	2001	Jean Jacques Smoothie	2 People	12
ECS 113	2001	Skymoo	Always & Forever	
ECS 116	2001	Feeder	Turn	27
ECS 118	2001	Spek	Look Me Up EP	
ECS 119	2002	DJ Innocence	So Beautiful	51
ECS 120	2002	The Psychedelic Waltons	Wonderland	37
ECS 121	2001	Feeder	Just a Day	12
ECS 122	2002	Spek	Smell the Coffee	52
ECS 123	2002	666	Supa-Dupa-Fly	
ECS 124	2001	Reeload	Why	
ECS 126	2002	Jean Jacques Smoothie	Love & Evil	83
ECS 127	2003	Nio www.bobbynio.co.uk	Mash Up	
ECS 129	2003	Desert Eagle Discs	Bigger Better Deal	67
ECS 130	2002	Feeder	Come Back Around	14
ECS 131	2003	Moloko	Familiar Feeling	10
ECS 132	2003	Nio www.bobbynio.co.uk	Do You Think You're Special?	52
ECS 133	2003	Feeder	Just the Way I'm Feeling	10
ECS 134	2003	I Am Kloot	Untitled #1	101
ECS 135	2003	Feeder	Forget About Tomorrow	12
ECS 136	2003	Moloko	Forever More	17
ECS 137	2003	Mirwais	Miss You	
ECS 138	2004	I Am Kloot	From Your Favourite Sky	
ECS 140	2003	I Am Kloot	Life in a Day	43
ECS 142	2003	The Stands	When This River Rolls Over You	32
ECS 143	2003	I Am Kloot	3 Feet Tall	46
ECS 145	2003	Feeder	Find the Colour	24
ECS 146	2003	The Stands	I Need You	39
ECS 147	2003	Moloko	Cannot Contain This	97
ECS 148	2004	The Stands	Here She Comes Again	25
ECS 150	2004	Engineers	Home	
ECS 151	2004	The Stands	Outside Your Door	49
ECS 152	2004	I Am Kloot	Proof	
ECS 154	2005	Engineers	Come In Out of the Rain	89
ECS 155	2005	Ray LaMontagne	Trouble	77
ECS 156	2005	The Vacation	Destitute Prostitutes	
ECS 157	2005	Feeder	Tumble and Fall	5
ECS 158	2005	Róisín Murphy	Sequins 1	
ECS 159	2005	Engineers	Forgiveness	48
ECS 160	2005	I Am Kloot	Over My Shoulder	38
ECS 161	2005	Róisín Murphy	Sequins 2	
ECS 162	2005	Róisín Murphy	Sequins 3	
ECS 163	2005	Feeder	Feeling a Moment	13
ECS 164	2005	Morcheeba	Wonders Never Cease	86
ECS 165	2005	The Stands	Do It Like You Like	28
ECS 166	2005	Engineers	Home (withdrawn)	
ECS 167	2005	I Am Kloot	Gods and Monsters (Remix)	
ECS 169	2005	Ray LaMontagne	Forever My Friend	
ECS 170	2005	Róisín Murphy	If We're in Love	234
ECS 171	2005	I Am Kloot	I Believe (withdrawn)	
ECS 173	2005	Feeder	Pushing the Senses	30
ECS 175	2005	Black Rebel Motorcycle Club	Ain't No Easy Way	21
ECS 176	2005	Morcheeba	Lighten Up	
ECS 177	2005	The Stands	When the Night Falls In (withdrawn)	
ECS 178	2005	Black Rebel Motorcycle Club	Weight of the World (withdrawn)	
ECS 179	2005	Róisín Murphy	Sow into You	
ECS 180	2005	Feeder	Shatter / Tender	11
ECS 181	2005	Morcheeba	Everybody Loves a Loser	
ECS 182	2006	Ray LaMontagne	Trouble (Remix)	
ECS 184	2006	Feeder	Lost & Found	12
ECS 185	2006	Bat for Lashes	The Wizard	
ECS 186	2006	Feeder	Save Us	34
ECS 188	2006	Bat for Lashes	Trophy	
ECS 189	2007	Bat for Lashes	Prescilla	
ECS 191	2007	Steven Lindsay	Monkey Gone to Heaven	
ECS 194	2007	Steven Lindsay	Kite	
ECS 195	2008	Jacob Golden	Out Come the Wolves / Zero Integrity	
ECS 196	2008	Morcheeba	Enjoy the Ride	
ECS 197	2008	Sarabeth Tucek	Something for You	
ECS 198	2008	Jacob Golden	On a Saturday	
ECS 199	2008	Feeder	We Are the People	25
ECS 200	2008	Morcheeba	Gained the World	
ECS 201	2008	Sarabeth Tucek	Nobody Cares	
ECS 205	2008	Feeder	Tracing Lines / Silent Cry	
ECS 210	2009	Nerina Pallot	Real Late Starter	19^{[I]}
ECS 213	2010	Nerina Pallot	I Don't Want To Go Out	

- I UK Indie Singles Chart
