= The Singles (Feeder album) =

Greatest hits album by Feeder
- Released: 15 May 2006
- Recorded: 1997–2006
- Length: 76:00
- Labels: Echo, EMI
- Producers: Gil Norton, Grant Nicholas, Chris Sheldon, Brian Sperber

Feeder chronology
Pushing the Senses (2005)	The Singles (2006)	Silent Cry (2008)

Singles from The Singles
- 1. "Lost and Found" Released: 1 May 2006; 2. "Save Us" Released: 24 July 2006

The Singles is Feeder's second UK compilation album, following the limited release b-sides album Picture of Perfect Youth.

The album has 18 of their UK top 40 hit single tracks (if "Shatter" and "Tender" are separately counted), with the exception of "Day In Day Out" and "Find The Colour", and includes the limited edition Arena Tour single "Comfort In Sound" and three new tracks, "Lost And Found", "Burn The Bridges" and "Save Us". "Lost and Found" and "Save Us" were released as singles to promote the compilation shortly before and after its release, charting at #12 and #34 in the UK respectively, while "Shatter" was released as an in-between single after the band decided not to release any more singles from Pushing the Senses.

It was the first time the singles "Suffocate" (a re-recorded version) and "Shatter" had a parent album connected to them while "Just a Day" (the edited version) had its first commercial album appearance (its unedited version also appears on Picture of Perfect Youth).

Limited Edition copies of the album are packaged with a DVD containing all of their promotional videos filmed to that point, bar an alternate "Piece By Piece" film used to promote the song's release as a single in mainland Europe. It is essentially an edit of the video for previous single "Suffocate".

Feeder's singles compilation made #2 in the UK charts after entering at #3 the week before. It went Platinum in August shipping over 300,000 copies. The album also seen an increase in publicity for the band, with a commercial on terrestrial TV which promoted the release.

At the end of 2006, the album's UK shipment increased to 500,000, and went Gold in the Republic of Ireland with sales over 7,500. Combined paid for sales and streaming sales equivalent units for the album, currently stand at 528,299 as of August 2019, making it one of the most popular artist compilation albums of all-time, in terms of sales within the United Kingdom. It is also Feeder's first of three albums to gain a certification internationally.

The cover artwork for the album was a frame from the Music Video for ‘Come Back Around’ which was also featured on the DVD Edition of ‘Comfort In Sound’

== Reception ==
Professional ratings
Review scores
Source	Rating
AllMusic	link
BBC Collective	Positive link
Daily Record	4/5 stars
Kerrang!	3/5 stars
Planet Sound	8/10 stars
Q	4/5 stars

The album is currently Feeder's longest-running release on the album top 5, top 10, top 20, top 30, and top 40 respectively. It has to date spent 30 weeks on the top 75, six behind Comfort in Sound, but charted on the 2006 year-end chart at #48, beating the #66 of the latter in 2003. It is also Feeder's first release to date to climb up the charts on its second week, in which it moved from #3 to #2 behind the Red Hot Chili Peppers's Stadium Arcadium; the following week it then dropped back down to its starting position of #3 when Orson's Bright Idea entered at the top. The album then dropped to #8 the week after, giving them their first album to spend more than a week in the top 10. It also spent the same number of weeks in those positions as all their four previous studio albums combined.

It was the UK's best-selling album by a British artist for its first three weeks, outselling the year's eventual biggest-seller, Eyes Open by Snow Patrol, for each of those weeks during that time. The album gained a UK platinum certification and was eventually more successful than Orson's Bright Idea.

If the UK Compilation Chart used the same rules as those used in France at the time, in which for example Greatest Hits compilations by an individual artist appeared in the same chart as Various Artists albums, The Singles would have spent three weeks at No.1 on that listing.

The album also became the first ever Feeder release to gain a non-UK sales certification, with 7,500 copies qualifying it for gold status in Ireland, despite never charting a top 20 single there. Although the album was not as well received in mainland of Europe as Pushing the Senses, it became Feeder's first ever top 10 breakthrough on the European Top 100 Albums, with a 16-week stay on the top 100, mainly due to its UK chart peak, making the top 20 in Ireland, and top 100 in Flanders. In Japan, the album became Feeder's first top 40 album chart entry anywhere outside of the UK and Ireland, by charting at #37 ("Feeling a Moment" made the top 40 singles chart in Australia).

== Track listing ==
CD

1. "Come Back Around" – 3:12 - from Comfort in Sound
2. "Buck Rogers" – 3:12 - from Echo Park
3. "Shatter" (single mix) – 2:57 - originally a B-side of 'Tumble and Fall', and from the Japanese Pushing the Senses.
4. "Just the Way I'm Feeling" – 4:18 - from Comfort in Sound
5. "Lost & Found" – 2:56 - new song
6. "Just a Day" (single edit) – 3:45 - original version appears on Picture of Perfect Youth
7. "High" – 4:33 - from the Polythene reissue
8. "Comfort in Sound" (Spike mix) – 3:37 - original version on Comfort in Sound
9. "Feeling a Moment" – 4:09 - from Pushing The Senses
10. "Burn the Bridges" – 3:37 - new song
11. "Tumble and Fall" – 4:20 - from Pushing the Senses
12. "Forget About Tomorrow" – 3:51 - from Comfort in Sound
13. "Tender" – 4:16 - from Pushing the Senses
14. "Pushing the Senses" (single mix) – 3:27 - original version on Pushing the Senses
15. "Save Us" – 3:50 - new song
16. "Seven Days in the Sun" – 3:39 - from Echo Park
17. "Insomnia" – 2:52 - from Yesterday Went Too Soon
18. "Turn" – 4:30 - from Echo Park
19. "Yesterday Went Too Soon" – 4:17 - from Yesterday Went Too Soon
20. "Suffocate" (single version) – 4:43 - original version on Polythene

DVD

1. "Lost and Found" – 2:58
2. "Shatter" – 3:00
3. "Tender" – 4:21
4. "Pushing the Senses" – 3:26
5. "Feeling a Moment" – 4:13
6. "Tumble and Fall" – 4:21
7. "Comfort in Sound" – 3:40
8. "Find the Colour" – 3:43
9. "Forget About Tomorrow" – 3:52
10. "Just the Way I'm Feeling" – 4:04
11. "Come Back Around" – 3:15
12. "Piece By Piece" (Animated Version) – 4:20
13. "Just A Day" – 4:09
14. "Turn" – 4:07
15. "Seven Days in the Sun" – 3:41
16. "Buck Rogers" – 3:12
17. "Paperfaces" – 4:03
18. "Yesterday Went Too Soon" – 4:20
19. "Insomnia" – 3:00
20. "Day In Day Out" – 3:29
21. "Suffocate" – 4:03
22. "High" – 4:28
23. "Crash" – 3:49
24. "Cement" – 3:18
25. "Tangerine" – 3:55
26. "Stereo World" – 3:30

== Charts ==
=== Weekly charts ===
Chart (2006)	Peak position
Belgian Albums (Ultratop Flanders)	95
Irish Albums (IRMA)	13
Scottish Albums (Official Charts)	3
UK Albums (Official Charts)	2

=== Year-end charts ===
Chart (2006)	Position
UK Albums (OCC)	48
