= Back Together =

Back Together may refer to:

- Back Together (album), by Michael Ball and Alfie Boe, 2019
- "Back Together" (song), by Robin Thicke, 2015
- "Back Together", a song by Anthony Hamilton, 2020
- "Back Together", a song by Babybird from There's Something Going On, 1998
- "Back Together", a song by Citizen Cope from Every Waking Moment, 2006
- "Back Together", a song by Jesse McCartney from In Technicolor, 2014
- "Back Together", an unreleased song by SZA

== See also ==
- Back Together Again (disambiguation)
