= The Greatest Hits (Babybird album) =

Compilation album by Baby Bird
- Released: 26 August 1997
- Recorded: 1988–1994
- Genre: Lo-fi/Indie
- Length: 67:44
- Language: English
- Label: Self-released
- Producer: Stephen Jones (Babybird)

Baby Bird chronology
Dying Happy (1996)	The Greatest Hits (1997)	The Original Lo-Fi (2002)

The Greatest Hits is a compilation album self-released by Babybird (aka Stephen Jones) in 1997. When it was released, Atlantic Records helped market a release of the album distributed by the Alternative Distribution Alliance. It consists of 20 songs, chosen by a vote of British consumers, each taken from one of Babybird's five previous indie albums. Atlantic's goal in marketing the album was to introduce Americans to Jones' numerous songs, none of which had previously been widely available in the United States.

== Critical reception ==
Professional ratings
Review scores
Source	Rating
AllMusic	4.5/5 stars
The Encyclopedia of Popular Music	3/5 stars
Robert Christgau	(1-star Honorable Mention)

As AllMusic put it, "Of course, the title is ironic -- irony is one of Stephen Jones/Baby Bird's fortes. It's ironic because the double-disc Greatest Hits doesn't contain "You're Gorgeous," the number two U.K. single that established his career. It's ironic because Greatest Hits is Baby Bird's first U.S. release, meaning that he hasn't had time to have any hits, let alone great ones."

== Track listing ==
All tracks written and composed by Stephen Jones.

Disc one

1. "Goddamn It, You're a Kid" – 3:07
2. "Man's Tight Vest" – 4:14
3. "KW Jesus TV Roof Appeal" – 3:58
4. "Bad Blood" – 3:54
5. "Kiss Your Country" – 4:04
6. "Hong Kong Blues" – 3:35
7. "Razorblade Shower" – 3:55
8. "Sha Na Na" – 2:42
9. "Aluminium Beach" – 4:34
10. "Alison" – 3:38
11. "Why" – 2:37
12. "I Didn't Want to Wake You Up" – 3:25

Disc two

1. "Grandma Begs to Be 18 Again" – 2:35
2. "I Was Never Here" – 3:53
3. "Petrol Cigarette" – 2:35
4. "Losing My Hair" – 3:42
5. "Saturday" – 2:29
6. "Invisible Tune" – 4:02
7. "Failed Old Singer" – 3:34
8. "Swinging from Tree to Tree" – 2:37
9. "Not About a Girl" – 2:32
10. "In the Morning" – 2:13
11. "Past Lasts Longer" – 3:13 (not listed on the discs or the artwork)
12. "Good Night" – 3:24 (not listed on the discs or the artwork)
