= Almost Cured of Sadness =

Studio album by Stephen Jones
- Released: 2003 (UK)
- Recorded: 2000s
- Genre: Indie
- Length: 68:00 (2003 CD version)
- Labels: Sanctuary, Delf Music
- Producer: Stephen Jones

Stephen Jones chronology
Plastic Tablets 2002 (2002)	Almost Cured of Sadness (2003)	Death of the Neighbourhood (2008)

Almost Cured of Sadness is a 2003 album by British singer-songwriter Stephen Jones.

Professional ratings
Review scores
Source	Rating
AllMusic	4.5/5 stars
Drowned In Sound	7/10 stars
Exclaim!	Positive
Magic	4/5 stars
The Times	Positive

== Track listing ==
All music is composed by Stephen Jones except "Sing a Rainbow" by Arthur Hamilton.

No.	Title	Length
1.	"Intro"	0:43
2.	"Keys To the Brain"	3:08
3.	"Under the Rainbow"	3:33
4.	"Good Day In a Bad World"	3:42
5.	"Interlude"	1:27
6.	"Friend"	3:32
7.	"Cured of Sadness"	3:58
8.	"American Dream"	3:10
9.	"Your Time"	3:33
10.	"Little Thug"	2:48
11.	"Sitting In My Graveyard"	3:58
12.	"Jesus Freaks and Candy Asses"	2:53
13.	"Interlude"	1:27
14.	"Radio's Been Thinking Again"	4:56
15.	"Someplace Too Faraway"	4:03
16.	"Quaaludes"	4:00
17.	"Interlude"	0:30
18.	"Almost Cured of Sadness"	4:15
19.	"My Girlfriend Killed Jesus"	10:50
20.	"Interlude"	Hidden track
21.	"Sing a Rainbow"	Hidden track
22.	"Before I Die"	Hidden track

2012 digital edition bonus tracks
No.	Title	Length
23.	"Friend (single mix)"	2:53
24.	"Retro Exterminator"	2:38
25.	"Walking In the Shadows"	3:31
26.	"f.u."	1:00
27.	"Sadness Does Have a Home"	2:09
28.	"Sugarlungs"	2:54
29.	"Plastic Bag"	3:09
