= I Was Born a Man =

Studio album by Baby Bird
- Released: July 1995 (UK)
- Recorded: 1990s
- Genre: Lo-fi, Indie
- Length: 46:26
- Label: Baby Bird Recordings
- Producer: Stephen Jones

Baby Bird chronology
I Was Born a Man (1995)	Bad Shave (1995)

I Was Born a Man was the first of five albums of home-made recordings, released by Stephen Jones under the name Baby Bird in 1995. The album was originally a limited edition release, but is now available as part of the 2002 CD box set The Original Lo-Fi.

The album includes a version of the song "Cornershop", which was subsequently a hit single for Jones' band Babybird (written as one word).

== Critical reception ==
Professional ratings
Review scores
Source	Rating
Allmusic	3.5/5 stars
Melody Maker	(favorable)

"I'll just say that I Was Born A Man is the only record I've heard this year with lyrics worth remembering and music that's impossible to forget, because I'd rather you listen to it than me talking about it." - Melody Maker.

"...whatever ultra-naff low-fidelity keyboard tinklings he undertakes; he carries with him incredibly touching pieces like Dead Bird Sings that create, in the middle of this tank top of a record, an altogether different kind of sadness." - NME

== Track listing ==
All tracks written and composed by Stephen Jones.

1. "Blow It to the Moon" – 2:40
2. "Mans Tight Vest" – 4:14
3. "Lemonade Baby" – 4:37
4. "C.F.C" – 3:30
5. "Cornershop" – 3:09
6. "Kiss Your Country" – 4:04
7. "Hong Kong Blues" – 3:34
8. "Dead Bird Sings" – 4:05
9. "Baby Bird" – 3:34
10. "Farmer" – 2:59
11. "Invisible Tune" – 3:54
12. "Alison" – 3:44
13. "Love Love Love" – 2:27
