= Bad Shave =

Studio album by Baby Bird
- Released: 5 October 1995
- Recorded: 1990s
- Genre: Lo-fi, Indie
- Length: 49:53
- Label: Baby Bird Recordings
- Producer: Stephen Jones

Baby Bird chronology
I Was Born a Man (1995)	Bad Shave (1995)	Fatherhood (1995)

Bad Shave was the second of five albums of home-made recordings, released by Stephen Jones under the name 'Baby Bird' in 1995.

It was originally a limited edition release, but is now available as part of the 2002 CD box set The Original Lo-Fi. The version of the album released as part of The Original Lo-Fi contains the additional tracks "Past Lasts Longer" and "Why?".

== Critical reception ==
Professional ratings
Review scores
Source	Rating
Allmusic	4/5 stars

"...unique, customised but never self-indulgent or irritatingly inaccessible. It's as off as it's beautiful, as rich as it's lo fi... imagine Ray Davies emerging, blinking and bearded, Howard Hughes like, after years in the darkness and you'll have some idea of the deeply, deeply English yet marvellously, utterly alien world of Baby Bird." – Melody Maker

== Track listing ==
All tracks written and composed by Stephen Jones.

1. "KW Jesus TV Roof Appeal" – 3:58
2. "Bad Jazz" – 3:06
3. "Too Handsome to Be Homeless" – 3:23
4. "Steam Train" – 2:36
5. "Bad Shave" – 3:18
6. "Oh My God You're a King" – 2:52
7. "The Restaurant Is Guilty" – 1:49
8. "Valerie" – 2:16
9. "Shop Girl" – 3:41
10. "W.B.T." – 3:54
11. "Hate Song" – 2:16
12. "45 & Fat" – 2:41
13. "Sha Na Na" – 2:41
14. "Bug in a Breeze" – 3:56
15. "It's Okay" – 2:27
16. "Happy Bus" – 2:30
17. "Swinging from Tree to Tree" – 2:35

== Personnel ==
- Stephen Jones – Producer, Played By, Design
- Baby Bird – Engineer
- P. Blakeman – Engineer
- Ded Associates – Design
