= The Happiest Man Alive =

Studio album by Baby Bird
- Released: 1 April 1996
- Recorded: 1990s
- Genre: Lo-fi/Indie
- Length: 60:09
- Label: Baby Bird Recordings
- Producer: Stephen Jones

Baby Bird chronology
Fatherhood (1995)	The Happiest Man Alive (1996)	Dying Happy (1996)

The Happiest Man Alive was the fourth of five albums of home-made recordings, released by Stephen Jones under the name Baby Bird in 1996.

It was originally a limited edition release, but is now available as part of the 2002 CD box set The Original Lo-Fi. The album includes a version of the song "Candy Girl", subsequently a UK top-ten hit for Jones' band Babybird (written as one word).

== Liner notes ==
All songs recorded on a 4-track tape recorder no bigger than a VCR. No Casio keyboards, no bellows-operated jazz synthesisers, no calor gas amplifiers have been used in these recordings. My attitude to resourcefulness-dictated-by-poverty never quite ran to stretching elastic bands over a washing-up bowl; though this technique, however tempting, is probably closer in spirit to Baby Bird than to musicianship.

The Happiest Man Alive is quality control on the grandest scale imaginable.

== Critical reception ==
Professional ratings
Review scores
Source	Rating
AllMusic	2/5 stars

"...an oblique sadist of spectacular talent. The Happiest Man Alive has an entire central nervous system of its own. It's a Frankenstein's monster of an album, gruesome and miraculous, stitched together from what would appear to be fragments of a dozen different psyches lodged inside one head." - Melody Maker

== Track listing ==
All tracks written and composed by Stephen Jones.

1. "Razorblade Shower" – 4:06
2. "Sundial in a Tunnel" – 2:52
3. "Little White Man" – 2:24
4. "Halfway Up the Hill" – 4:36
5. "Horsesugar" – 2:49
6. "Please Don't Be Famous" – 3:30
7. "Louise" – 2:31
8. "Seagullably" – 2:54
9. "Copper Feel" – 3:27
10. "Dead in Love" – 3:50
11. "Candy Girl" – 3:46
12. "Gunfingers" – 2:45
13. "Married" – 0:11
14. "I Took a Drug" – 4:56 (not listed on the CD)
15. "In the Country" – 2:47
16. "Planecrash Xmas" – 3:14
17. "This Beautiful Disease" – 4:08
18. "You'll Get a Slap" – 3:16
19. "In The Morning" – 2:12

== Personnel ==
- Stephen Jones – Instruments, Artwork
- Colin Bradley – Tarted-Up-by
- DED Associates – Artwork
- D. Jones – Model
