= Between My Ears There Is Nothing But Music =

Studio album by Babybird
- Released: 25 September 2006
- Genre: Indie
- Length: 45:48
- Label: Babybird Records

Babybird chronology
Bugged (2000)	Between My Ears There Is Nothing But Music (2006)	Ex-Maniac (2010)

Professional ratings
Review scores
Source	Rating
Allmusic	4/5 stars

Between My Ears There Is Nothing But Music is the fourth studio album by rock band Babybird released in 2006. It was the first album that they recorded after leaving Echo Records in 2000. It was released by Babybird Records.

== Track listing ==
1. "Too Much" (3:47)
2. "Dive" (3:32)
3. "Snails" (3:12)
4. "Old Skin" (4:00)
5. "Little Things" (3:40)
6. "70" (3:46)
7. "Lighter 'N' Spoon" (3:21)
8. "Divorce Song" (3:55)
9. "Shoutabout" (3:53)
10. "Better Than Love" (3:23)
11. "Beautiful Place" (9:19)

Note: The last track is listed as "Beautiful Place" on the cover but as "Lost in a Beautiful Place" in the lyric booklet that comes with the CD. The song concludes at 5:11. A silence follows until 6:13 when an unlisted song, titled 'I'm Gone', ends the album.
