= Feeling a Moment =

2005 single by Feeder

Single by Feeder

from the album Pushing the Senses
- Released: 4 April 2005
- Length: 4:09
- Label: Echo
- Songwriter: Grant Nicholas
- Producers: Grant Nicholas, Gil Norton

Feeder singles chronology
"Tumble and Fall" (2005)	"Feeling a Moment" (2005)	"Pushing the Senses" (2005)

"Feeling a Moment" is a song by Welsh rock band Feeder from their fifth album, Pushing the Senses (2005). It was released as the second single from the album on 4 April 2005 and reached number 13 on the UK Singles Chart. The song also reached number 32 in Australia, becoming Feeder's only song to chart there. At the end of 2005, it was voted the 98th best song of the year by the readers of Q magazine.

In 2024 the single was certified silver by the British Phonographic Industry (BPI) for 200,000 pure and streaming equivalent sales combined.

The single includes a U-MYX application that allows the user to mix the track. A competition was held by the band's website "Feederweb" in which fans sent their remixes into a specially designed website in which they could upload their new mix, and the best one would then appear on the vinyl release of the next single.

== Track listings ==
CD1

1. "Feeling a Moment"
2. "Bruised"

CD2

1. "Feeling a Moment"
2. "Murmer"
3. "Frequency" (vox and piano version)
4. "Feeling a Moment" (U-MYX/enhanced video)

7-inch picture disc

1. "Feeling a Moment"
2. "Murmer"

== Charts ==
Chart (2005)	Peak position
Australia (ARIA)	32
Scottish Singles Sales (Official Charts)	13
UK Singles (Official Charts)	13
UK Indie (Official Charts)	1

== Certifications ==
Region	Certification	Certified units/sales
United Kingdom (BPI)	Silver	200,000^{‡}
^{‡} Sales+streaming figures based on certification alone.
