= The Pleasures of Self Destruction =

Studio album by Babybird
- Released: 31 October 2011
- Genre: Indie rock
- Label: Unison
- Producer: Bruce Witkin, Ryan Dorn

Babybird chronology
Ex-Maniac (2010)	The Pleasures of Self Destruction (2011)	Back to the Womb (2015)

Professional ratings
Review scores
Source	Rating
Allmusic	3.5/5 stars

The Pleasures of Self Destruction is the sixth studio album by rock band Babybird released in 2011, on Unison Records. The album features Johnny Depp, who is said to be a "long time fan" of the band, on guitar on one track, the first track "Jesus Stag Night Club"

== Track listing ==
All tracks written and composed by Stephen Jones.

1. "Jesus Stag Night Club" (4.20)
2. "Beautiful Haze" (4.29)
3. "The Best Days of Our Lives" (3.28)
4. "I Love Her" (3.54)
5. "Not Love" (3.00)
6. "Can’t Love You Any More" (4.35)
7. "Don’t Wake Me" (4.10)
8. "I’m Not a Killer" (3.55)
9. "www.song" (4.06)
10. "A Little More Each Day" (3.45)
11. "Song for the Functioning Alcoholic" (3.32)
12. "The World Is Ours" (2.36)
13. "Remember Us" (4.22)
