= Shatter (song) =

2005 single by Feeder

Song by Feeder
- A-side: "Tumble and Fall"
- Released: 17 January 2005
- Length: 3:01
- Label: Echo
- Songwriter: Grant Nicholas
- Producer: Grant Nicholas

"Shatter"

Single by Feeder
- A-side: "Tender"
- Released: 10 October 2005
- Length: 3:01
- Label: Echo
- Songwriter: Grant Nicholas

Feeder singles chronology
"Pushing the Senses" (2005)	"Shatter" / "Tender" (2005)	"Lost and Found" (2006)

"Shatter" is a song by the British rock band Feeder. "Shatter" was first released as B-side to "Tumble and Fall" and as a bonus to the Japanese edition of Pushing the Senses; it has since been included on the band's compilation album The Singles.

Released on 10 October 2005, the single was backed by "Tender" from the fifth studio album Pushing the Senses.

== Music video ==
The video for "Tender" is a band performance video, and first appeared on the "Depot sessions" section of the Pushing the Senses DVD bonus disc.

"Shatter" uses clips from the movie Night Watch and recreated film sets the band are seen performing and acting in. Frontman Grant Nicholas revealed that the long tube he carried, was lit up by wires going up his arm from a battery pack, then up to a light in the tube.

== Reception ==
The single peaked at number 11, and became Feeder's 10th Top 20 single, falling short of the top 10 and would have been the band's 4th top 10 single. However, in Scotland it reached number 9 giving the band their 4th top 10 single in that country and second of the year. In Wales, the single under-performed reaching number 32, which was seen as a failure especially being their homeland. When the band eventually released their compilation album The Singles in mid-2006 which included both tracks, it was for its first three weeks of release the UK's best-selling compilation album, while the single itself entered the UK Independent Singles Chart at No.1 giving the band not only their third chart topper of the year, but also the only artist in 2005 to have three number one singles on that chart.

"Shatter" charted at number 57 on the top 100 UK airplay chart. "Tender" reached number 55 but did not pick up as much audience figures overall, due to not being given very much radio play, as "Shatter" was the main track to promote the release.

Although the single did miss out on a Top 10 spot in the mainstream chart, it was however considered a big enough success to be included as one of the featured singles in the chart that week, on the then BBC flagship music programme Top of the Pops giving them their 12th appearance on the show. This was notable for being the last ever appearance on the show for bassist Taka Hirose, as their next and last appearance on the show prior to its 2006 cancellation when "Lost and Found" was performed, featured the band's then touring guitarist Dean Tidey on bass while Hirose was attending the birth of his daughter.

"Shatter" was a live regular between 2005–2009, with it later making a return to setlists in 2017 due to fan votes on their Facebook page (also with an acoustic intro as opposed to a hi-hat effect used in the past).

== Media usage ==
The two tracks on the single are played during the end credits of the UK and international releases of the Russian dark fantasy film Night Watch, though on the American release, both songs are replaced by "Fearless" by The Bravery and an instrumental piece. "Shatter" was originally a part of the Gran Turismo 4 Original Soundtrack.

== Track listing ==
CD single

1. "Shatter" (new version)
2. "Tender" (radio version)
3. "Everybody Hurts"
4. "Tender" (enhanced video)

DVD single

1. "Shatter" (video)
2. "Making of Shatter – behind the scenes"
3. "Tender – We The Undersigned – 'The Shatter Vote'"
4. "Everybody Hurts – Your War Is Not With Me" (War Child video) .

7-inch single

1. "Shatter" (B-side version)
2. "Tender" (radio version)

== Charts ==
Chart (2005)	Peak position
Scotland Singles (OCC)	9
UK Singles (OCC)	11
UK Indie (OCC)	1
