= Pushing the Senses (song) =

2005 single by Feeder

Single by Feeder

from the album Pushing the Senses
- Released: 27 June 2005
- Length: 3:28
- Label: Echo
- Songwriter(s): Grant Nicholas
- Producer(s): Grant Nicholas, Gil Norton

Feeder singles chronology
"Feeling a Moment" (2005)	"Pushing the Senses" (2005)	"Shatter" / "Tender" (2005)

"Pushing the Senses" was the third single released from Welsh rock band Feeder's fifth studio album, Pushing the Senses (2005). It reached number 30 on the UK Singles Chart, becoming their 20th top-75 hit in the process. It was the lowest they had charted with a single in six years, after "Paperfaces" made number 41 in 1999. As the video features live gig montages, it is only the second time Feeder’s touring guitarist Dean Tidey has featured in any of their videos.

The remix of "Feeling a Moment" was created by a fan of the band who won a competition to have his remix featured on the single. The single of "Feeling a Moment" had a special U-MYX programme that allowed you to remix the track, and the fans could then upload their mixes to a specially designated website to enter the competition. The remix of the single track was done by Chris Sheldon, with obvious differences to the album track, the track being available on the platinum selling 'The Singles' compilation album, but it is still debated as to which version is more popular.

== Track listings ==
CD

1. "Pushing the Senses" (Chris Sheldon Mix)
2. "I for You"
3. "Crowd of Stars"
4. "Pushing the Senses" (video)

7-inch

1. "Pushing the Senses" (Chris Sheldon Mix)
2. "Feeling a Moment" (Pete Lavelles's Squeaky Clean Mix)

Download exclusives

1. "Pushing the Senses" (acoustic)
2. "Pushing the Senses" (live from Brussels)
