= Lost and Found (Feeder song) =

2006 single by Feeder

Single by Feeder

from the album The Singles
- Released: 1 May 2006
- Recorded: Late 2005
- Length: 2:57
- Label: Echo
- Songwriter(s): Grant Nicholas
- Producer(s): Grant Nicholas, Matt Sime

Feeder singles chronology
"Shatter / Tender" (2005)	"Lost and Found" (2006)	"Save Us" (2006)

"Lost and Found" is a single from UK rock band Feeder and is one of three new songs featured on their compilation album, The Singles. It was the second single from the compilation after "Shatter" was a double A-side with "Tender".

The song was voted 79th best song of 2006 by the readers of Q Magazine. The music video features Feeder playing in an abandoned community centre and a street gang. The vinyl set also includes a 1998 recording named "Uptight", which features Jon Lee playing drums. The music video uses quick switching of the scenes featuring the band and the gang, this has been noted by many who have seen the video as off-putting due to the speed the scene changes are made which were likened to that of those that can cause epileptic seizures.

Lost and Found was supported for the first time with a series of digital downloads, recorded live during each date of the bands delayed 2005–2006 tour, and helped the track chart at No. 20 on the UK Download Chart, and No. 12 in the UK Singles Chart in May 2006. It became their fifth and last top 10 single in Scotland charting at No. 9. During live performances of the song, the band use the opening lines of All My Life by the band Foo Fighters as an interlude throughout 2008.

The single made No.7 on the physical sales chart, becoming their fifth and final top 10 single on that chart prior to the 2007 rule change on downloads on the overall chart, being when CD singles started to become a near extinct format. “Lost and Found” was their second to last single release when a physical single had to be released to allow a song to chart.

This single also marked the band's 13th and final appearance on the now-defunct long running BBC music show Top of the Pops, which used the weekly charts as its format. The performance was notable for the band's then live guest guitarist Dean Tidey filling in for bassist Taka Hirose as he was unable to attend the recording due to his then partner giving birth to their daughter Kolo.

== Critical reception ==
The song was released to a generally mixed reception. Kerrang! picked the song as a highlight of the accompanying compilation The Singles, specifically marking it as a song for readers to "download". However, Stylus Magazine were not impressed with the song, with an average reviewer score of 2.33/10, with Joris Gillet of the publication giving the single 4/10 and saying it "leaves no impression whatsoever."

Despite the critical reception, the track was however well received by the general public, helping its parent compilation album stay in the top 10 albums chart for 4 weeks, although this did in the long run, affect the sales of follow up single "Save Us".

== Track listing ==
=== CD ===
1. "Lost and Found" – 2:57
2. "High 5" – 2:30
3. "Lost and Found" (acoustic) – 3:10
4. "Lost and Found" (video)

=== CD (Europe) ===
1. "Lost and Found" – 2:59
2. "High 5" – 2:32
3. "Uptight" – 3:12
4. "Lost and Found" (acoustic) – 3:15
5. "Lost and Found" (video)

=== 7" #1 ===
1. "Lost and Found"
2. "High 5"

=== 7" #2 (Gatefold) ===
1. "Lost and Found"
2. "Uptight"

=== Download exclusives ===
1. "Lost and Found" (Live from Hammersmith Apollo 21 March 2006)
2. "Lost and Found" (Live from Hammersmith Apollo 22 March 2006)
3. "Lost and Found" (Live from Brighton Centre 24 March 2006)
4. "Lost and Found" (Live from Birmingham NEC 25 March 2006)
