= Fatherhood (album) =

Studio album by Baby Bird
- Released: December 1995 (UK)
- Recorded: 1990s
- Genre: Lo-fi, Indie
- Length: 59:54
- Label: Baby Bird Recordings
- Producer: Stephen Jones

Baby Bird chronology
Bad Shave (1995)	Fatherhood (1995)	The Happiest Man Alive (1996)

Fatherhood was the third of five albums of home-made recordings, released by Stephen Jones under the name Baby Bird in 1995. The album includes a version of the song "Goodnight", which was subsequently released as the first single by Jones' band Babybird (written as one word).

It was originally a limited edition release, but is now available as part of the 2002 CD box set The Original Lo-Fi.

== Critical reception ==
Professional ratings
Review scores
Source	Rating
Allmusic	4.5/5 stars

"...a mixture of whimsy, egotism and madness with a good bit of talent stirred in...his puzzled world-view is unique. He fills the 20 tracks with strangenesses. Weirdly wonderful." – The Guardian

"Fatherhood is another unpredictable and magical journey through the thoughts of Stephen Jones, a man who is clearly in love with sweet melodies and the millions of ways you can fuck them up...you might find the whole experience as cigar-puffingly satisfying as becoming a dad." – The Independent

== Track listing ==
All tracks written and composed by Stephen Jones.

1. "No Children" – 1:08
2. "Cooling Towers" – 3:14
3. "Cool & Crazy Things to Do" – 2:41
4. "Bad Blood" – 3:55
5. "Neil Armstrong" – 2:21
6. "I Was Never Here" – 3:53
7. "Saturday" – 2:29
8. "Good Night" – 3:26
9. "I Don't Want to Wake You Up" – 3:27
10. "Iceberg" – 3:10
11. "Aluminium Beach" – 4:36
12. "Goddamn It, You're a Kid" – 3:07
13. "Daisies" – 2:08
14. "Failed Old Singer" – 3:34
15. "Fatherhood" – 2:28
16. "Dustbin Liner" – 2:53
17. "Not About a Girl" – 2:32
18. "Good Weather" – 3:25
19. "But Love" – 1:58
20. "May We" – 3:35
