= There's Something Going On =

Studio album by Babybird
- Released: 24 August 1998
- Genre: Indie
- Length: 51:28
- Label: Echo

Babybird chronology
Ugly Beautiful (1996)	There's Something Going On (1998)	Bugged (2000)

Singles from There's Something Going On
- 1. "Bad Old Man" Released: 27 April 1998; 2. "If You'll Be Mine" Released: 10 August 1998; 3. "Back Together" Released: 15 February 1999

Professional ratings
Review scores
Source	Rating
AllMusic	4/5 stars
The Encyclopedia of Popular Music	3/5 stars
NME	3.5/5 stars

There's Something Going On is the second studio album by the rock band Babybird, released in 1998. Unlike the band's previous album, Ugly Beautiful, only one of the tracks is an alternative version of an original recording made by lead singer, Stephen Jones, before the band was formed. The original version of "I Was Never Here" can be heard on Fatherhood.

The album peaked at No. 28 on the UK Albums Chart.

== Critical reception ==
The Irish Times wrote that "Baby Bird's mix of sweet pop and sour grapes is not always palatable, but sometimes it's a welcome tonic for jaded Britpoppers." Spin deemed it "bittersweetly twisted."

The album was voted No. 14 in NME's albums of the year for 1998.

== Track listing ==
1. "Bad Old Man" – 4:35
2. "If You'll Be Mine" – 4:40
3. "Back Together" – 4:26
4. "I Was Never Here" – 5:06
5. "First Man on the Sun" – 3:44
6. "You Will Always Love Me" – 3:56
7. "The Life" – 5:17
8. "All Men Are Evil" – 4:01
9. "Take Me Back" – 6:05
10. "It's Not Funny Anymore" – 7:10
11. "There's Something Going On" – 2:28

== Charts ==
Chart performance for There's Something Going On
Chart (1998)	Peak position
UK Albums (OCC)	28
