= Bugged (album) =

Studio album by Babybird
- Released: 12 June 2000
- Genre: Indie
- Label: Echo Records

Babybird chronology
There's Something Going On (1998)	Bugged (2000)	Between My Ears There Is Nothing But Music (2006)

Singles from Bugged
- 1. "The F-Word" Released: 13 March 2000; 2. "Out of Sight" Released: 22 May 2000

Professional ratings
Review scores
Source	Rating
Allmusic	3/5 stars
laut.de	5/5 stars

Bugged is the third studio album by rock band Babybird released in 2000. It was also the last album the band released on the Echo Records label before being dropped. The band subsequently split but re-united once again in 2006 for their fourth studio album Between My Ears There Is Nothing But Music.

The album features the single "The F-Word" which was later used as the theme tune for Gordon Ramsay's television series of the same name.

The song "Getaway" was also used in an episode of Trigger Happy TV.

== Track listing ==
All tracks by Stephen Jones

1. "The F-Word" - 3:03
2. "Getaway" - 4:59
3. "Out Of Sight" - 4:28
4. "Fireflies" - 3:39
5. "Eyes In The Back Of Your Head" - 3:53
6. "Till You Die" - 3:10
7. "Wave Your Hands" - 4:15
8. "All I Want Is Love" - 5:17
9. "The Way You Are" - 4:51
10. "One Dead Groove/The Xmas God Of New York" - 15:24

== Personnel ==
- Steve Bloom – photography
- Ben Castle – horn
- Matt Hay – programming, producer, engineer, mixing, instrumentation
- Ben Hiller – programming, engineer
- Ben Hillier – programming, engineer
- Stephen Jones – producer, instrumentation
- Paul Newton – horn
- Steve Osborne – producer, mixing
- Luke Scott – producer, instrumentation
- Nichol Thompson – horn
