= Ex-Maniac =

Studio album by Babybird
- Released: 1 March 2010
- Genre: Indie rock
- Label: Unison
- Producer: Bruce Witkin, Ryan Dorn

Babybird chronology
Between My Ears There Is Nothing But Music (2006)	Ex-Maniac (2010)	The Pleasures of Self Destruction (2011)

Professional ratings
Review scores
Source	Rating
AllMusic	3.5/5 stars
BBC Online	(Mixed)
Sunday Times	4/5 stars
The Times	3/5 stars

Ex-Maniac is the fifth studio album by the rock band Babybird, released by Unison Records in 2010. The album features Johnny Depp, who is said to be a "long time fan" of the band, playing guitar on "Unloveable" [sic], the first single from the album. Depp also directed the video for the single.

The album was produced by Bruce Witkin and Ryan Dorn, who were introduced to Stephen Jones, Babybird's frontman, by Depp. The album also features the actor Stephen Graham. The video's plot is an interpretation of the short story "An Occurrence at Owl Creek Bridge" by Ambrose Bierce.

== Critical reception ==
The Press wrote that "these 11 instantly infectious songs find [Jones's] lyrics as sharp as his ear for a tune, further invigorated by working with new musicians in Los Angeles."

== Track listing ==
All tracks written and composed by Stephen Jones.

1. "Like Them"
2. "Drug Time"
3. "Failed Suicide Club"
4. "Unloveable"
5. "Send Me Back My Dreams"
6. "For The Rest of Our Lives"
7. "Bastard"
8. "Roadside Girl"
9. "Black Flowers"
10. "Not Good Enough"
11. "On The Backseat of Your Car"
