= Save Us =

2006 single by Feeder

Single by Feeder

from the album The Singles
- Released: 24 July 2006
- Length: 3:50
- Label: Echo
- Songwriter(s): Grant Nicholas
- Producer(s): Grant Nicholas, Stephen Street

Feeder singles chronology
"Lost and Found" (2006)	"Save Us" (2006)	"We Are the People" (2008)

"Save Us" is a song by British rock band Feeder. Taken from their compilation The Singles, it is one of the three new songs on the album. The DVD of the single includes footage of when the band visited The Congo, for the charity War Child who supports children living in war-torn countries. The members of Feeder are patrons of the charity themselves.

When the single charted, it entered at number 34, making it one of the bands smallest hits. However, it helped the compilation album The Singles improve its weekly chart performance for a few weeks bringing it back into the top 20 after a four-week spell holding at number 21. Before the release of the single, The Singles was already a platinum-selling album having already spent four weeks on the UK top ten album chart, thus denting its chances to chart high. Also, many high street and online retailers were selling the album for a slightly lower or slightly higher price, with very little difference than the "Save Us" single on all three of its formats.

== Track listings ==
CD

1. "Save Us" - 3:51
2. "Purify" - 3:51
3. "Dove Grey Sands" (acoustic) - 4:05

7-inch white vinyl

1. "Save Us" - 3:51
2. "Purify" - 3:51

DVD

1. "Save Us" (video)
2. "Save Us" (Warchild Photogallery And Messages)
3. "Save Us" (Landscapes Mix Instrumental)
4. "Save Us" (Warchild Feeder In The Congo Video)
