= Ugly Beautiful =

Studio album by Babybird
- Released: 21 October 1996
- Genre: Britpop; indie pop
- Length: 70:29
- Label: Echo
- Producer: Stephen Jones; Steve Power; Darren Allison; Ian Caple

Babybird chronology
Dying Happy (1996)	Ugly Beautiful (1996)	There's Something Going On (1998)

Singles from Ugly Beautiful
- 1. "Goodnight" Released: 29 July 1996; 2. "You're Gorgeous" Released: 30 September 1996; 3. "Candy Girl" Released: 20 January 1997; 4. "Cornershop" Released: 5 May 1997

Ugly Beautiful is a 1996 album by Babybird, the band's sixth, though their first for Echo Records. Released on 21 October, the album includes the singles "Goodnight", "Candy Girl", "You're Gorgeous" and "Cornershop". "You're Gorgeous" was a surprise top-three UK and international hit for the group. The album was written entirely by band-leader Stephen Jones. Many of the songs were written and recorded by Jones alone between 1988 and 1994. Several of the songs had been released in these demo incarnations on Jones' solo lo-fi work as Baby Bird that he did prior to forming the band with John Pedder, Robert Gregory, Luke Scott and Huw Chadbourn. The majority of the album was produced by Jones with Steve Power. Darren Allison and Ian Caple each produced a song.

== Release and reception ==
Professional ratings
Review scores
Source	Rating
AllMusic	4.5/5 stars
Christgau's Consumer Guide	(2-star Honorable Mention)
Encyclopedia of Popular Music	3/5 stars
Entertainment Weekly	B+
The Guardian	4/5 stars
Music Week	5/5 stars
Pitchfork	6.7/10
Rolling Stone	3.5/5 stars

Ugly Beautiful received generally positive reviews. The Independent wrote, "It's not just that the songs sound less like dashed-off demos – there is also an increased depth of musical character to them, which renders them more like collective notions rather than the mad imaginings of a marginalised loner".

The album was released on CD, cassette and double-LP. US editions differ from international versions with "King Bing" substituted for "CFC". The album charted at number nine on the UK Albums Chart, number fifteen on the New Zealand Album Chart, and was certified Gold by the BPI. The artwork was designed by Stephen Jones and DED Associates with photography by Al Levy.

== Track listing ==
All tracks written and composed by Stephen Jones.

1. "Goodnight" – 2:53
2. "Candy Girl" – 3:56
3. "Jesus Is My Girlfriend" – 5:24
4. "I Didn't Want to Wake You Up" – 5:15
5. "Dead Bird Sings" – 5:11
6. "Atomic Soda" – 5:08
7. "You're Gorgeous" – 3:42
8. "Bad Shave 2" – 3:27
9. "Cornershop" – 3:48
10. "King Bing" – 9:53
11. "You & Me" – 4:10
12. "45 & Fat" – 4:11
13. "Too Handsome to Be Homeless" – 4:44
14. "July" – 3:46
15. "Baby Bird" – 5:01

=== US release ===
The US release substitutes "King Bing" for "CFC".

1. "Goodnight" – 2:53
2. "Candy Girl" – 3:57
3. "Jesus Is My Girlfriend" – 5:24
4. "I Didn't Want to Wake You Up" – 5:15
5. "Dead Bird Sings" – 4:24
6. "Atomic Soda" – 5:08
7. "You're Gorgeous" – 3:42
8. "Bad Shave" – 4:39
9. "Cornershop" – 3:48
10. "You & Me" – 4:09
11. "45 & Fat" – 4:13
12. "Too Handsome to Be Homeless" – 4:44
13. "CFC" – 3:42
14. "July" – 3:47
15. "Baby Bird" – 5:00

== Personnel ==
The following credits are adapted from the CD liner notes.

- Ugly Beautiful was made by John Pedder, Robert Gregory, Stephen Jones, Luke Scott and Huw Chadbourn.
- Stephen Jones – all instruments (tracks 3, 6, 9, 11)
- Matt Hay – viola (track 5)
- Stephen Jones and Steve Power – co-producer (all tracks except 3, 6, 8, 9, 11)
- Stephen Jones – producer (tracks 3, 6 10)
- Stephen Jones and Darren Allison – producer (track 8)
- Ian Caple – producer (track 9)
- Darren Allison – mixing (track 13)
- Matt Hay – mixing (tracks 3 and 6)
- Stephen Jones and DED Associates – artwork
- Al Levy – photography
- John Pedder and DED Associates – egg (graphics)
- Douglas Cape – band photography

== Charts ==
Chart performance for Ugly Beautiful
Chart (1996–1997)	Peak position
New Zealand Albums (RMNZ)	15
UK Albums (OCC)	9

== Certifications ==
Certifications for Ugly Beautiful
Region	Certification	Certified units/sales
United Kingdom (BPI)	Gold	100,000^{^}
^{^} Shipments figures based on certification alone.
