= Pushing the Senses =

Studio album by Feeder
- Released: 31 January 2005
- Recorded: 2004
- Studios: Abbey Road (London, England)
- Genres: Alternative rock; power pop; post-Britpop; soft rock
- Length: 40:28
- Label: Echo
- Producers: Ken Nelson; Grant Nicholas; Gil Norton

Feeder chronology
Picture of Perfect Youth (2004)	Pushing the Senses (2005)	The Singles (2006)

Singles from Pushing the Senses
- 1. "Tumble and Fall" Released: 17 January 2005; 2. "Feeling a Moment" Released: 4 April 2005; 3. "Pushing the Senses" Released: 27 June 2005; 4. "Tender" Released: 10 October 2005

Pushing the Senses is the fifth studio album by Welsh rock band Feeder. It was released on Echo, Liberation Music and PIAS on 31 January 2005 in the United Kingdom, Australia, New Zealand and Europe, while being released on Pony Canyon in Japan on 10 February 2005. Despite mixed reviews, the album was a commercial success, in which it was a top-five album in Feeder's native United Kingdom, and its lead single "Tumble and Fall" was a top-five single. This made the album Feeder's most successful in terms of peak chart position, but did not experience the same chart longevity as predecessor Comfort in Sound, which spent 36 weeks on the UK top 75 chart in comparison to the 15 weeks spent by Pushing the Senses.

The album represented a similar musical style as seen on 2002's Comfort in Sound, and featured more songs written on a piano and also had, as described by frontman Grant Nicholas, more of an "organic" sound than that of the latter. Inspirations were that of John Lennon within some of the songwriting.

Most critics criticised the band's approach to what was described as Keane and Coldplay style music, and "departing" from their trademark sound heard on their first three albums, while Q magazine stated that the album could "finally establish Feeder as major league players".

== Recording and production ==
Pushing the Senses contains music in the same rock styles featured on Feeder's 2002 album Comfort in Sound, but it focuses more on pianos, rather than a string orchestra. Only "Pain on Pain" on the album mainly used strings, including samples from a mellotron. Frontman Grant Nicholas said he did not think the album needed them. He also called the album the band's "Recovery album" as he felt he was more at ease writing the songs than he was with Comfort in Sound, after the loss of their drummer Jon Lee, alongside stating that he was inspired by artists such as John Lennon within the piano playing and writing the songs. Grant told Kerrang! in May 2004, "I've done some recording on my own in a little studio up by where I live in North London. I demo the album in its full form before the rest of the band play on it. It's difficult to know at this stage what it will turn out like, but so far its slightly more mature sounding". Grant later added "Each album is a journey and a reflection of the past, there is some stuff that touches on what has happened, but there are songs about love, songs of loss and songs about the future. I don't want to give too much away but there's one track called "Bitter Glass". Its quite dark but uplifting too. It's about pulling yourself out of a big hole".

Feeder and Gil Norton recorded the bulk of Pushing the Senses in 2004 at Abbey Road Studios, in London, England. Ken Nelson recorded "Frequency" in Liverpool with the band, as Grant felt he could capture the organic sound. Grant recorded the piano first with the rest of the track built around it. Grant said the album as a whole does have a retro sound to it, but the band did not want it to "sound too retro". The title track was one of the first songs Grant wrote for the album in 2003, and was at first written on a piano before being translated to guitar, and also said that he could have easily recorded the song with strings. "Tumble and Fall", which became the album's first single, saw Grant describe the recording process as "old fashioned", with bass player Taka Hirose saying that the band should include it on the album. The song was recorded with the vocal and an acoustic guitar at first, and then the other parts of the music built around it.

In an interview with the band's official website Feederweb, Grant explained that "Feeling a Moment", was played back with the intro playing backwards, in which he explained: "This was one of the first songs written for the album. I actually started recording that song in the studio on my own at the Crypt. The song was written at home, as soon as I had that intro, the vocal "woo who" bit—what ever you want to call it—that was a really important hook for the song." In a DVD packaged with limited quantities of the album, Grant is seen playing a piano during the recording sessions, and once said that "[he] don't [sic] rate himself as a piano player". He also stated that Feeder are a band, and even though he writes all the songs, he makes sure drummer Mark Richardson and bass player Taka Hirose have their say in the process of their creation.

== Songs ==
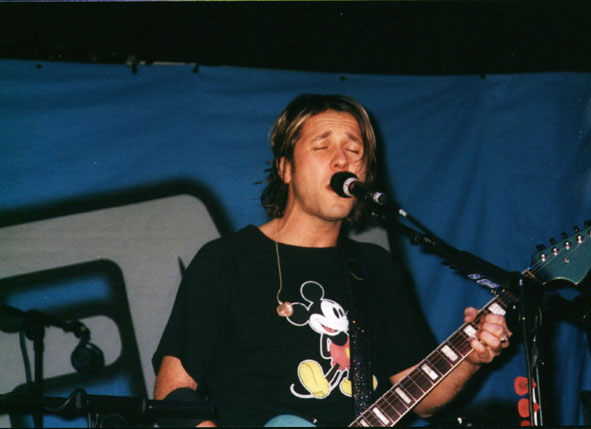
Grant Nicholas performing with Feeder at the Islington Academy, promoting the Pushing The Senses album, as part of the XFM live session series.

"Tumble and Fall", the third track on Pushing the Senses, was chosen as its lead single, because their European label Play it Again Sam (PIAS), were getting more involved with the band, believing the song would be a crossover to make them successful in Europe after touring with Coldplay in 2003. The single became the band's most successful single release since "Buck Rogers", reaching the top five in the UK. Grant claimed that "Tumble and Fall" is a love song, but can be interpreted in any way. In an interview with Feederweb, Grant said of the song: "Again this is about the ups and downs of life. Its about life in general and how you deal with it. It covers the journey of life and how you have to take the ups with the downs. I wasn’t going to record this song. It took me a long time to finish it, to be happy with it, because the song went through various stages. I wasn’t sure if we really needed a tune like that on the album. But I decided to go to the studio to record an acoustic version just to see what happened and that’s how the song started. It was a completely one take vocal, live with the acoustic guitar and we built everything else around it. It is an acoustic track that grew into what it is now. So that was the only song that we recorded like that on the album, so it is a bit different for that reason and is probably why it has an organic feel to it".

The second single, "Feeling a Moment", received a positive review from Q magazine, in which the song was compared to "Beautiful Day" by U2, in which Paul Brannigan stated that the song "Has the optimistic soaring feel of U2's Beautiful Day...". It charted at number thirteen in the UK Singles Chart, and was originally going to be the album's first single.

"Pushing the Senses", the third single, was released in July of the same year, but became the band's lowest charting single since "Day In Day Out" from 1999, when it entered the UK chart at number thirty. Grant Nicholas described it as "One of the most upbeat songs on the album", while comparing it to "Classic Feeder". This was followed-up in November with "Shatter / Tender", in which "Shatter" was a b-side on "Tumble and Fall" and eventually left off the album after the record company felt it would not fit in with the rest of the tracks, despite Grant Nicholas' protests but was included on the Japanese release. A petition was set up to release the song as a single, and was also included alongside album track "Tender" on the end credits of the European dub of the Russian film Night Watch. The single reached number eleven in the UK singles chart. "Tender" was described by Grant as "a healing song" and was written on the piano.

"Bitterglass" was one of the earlier songs written for the album, while being one of Grant's favourite songs it is also seen by him as one of the darker songs on the record, and refers to the events of Jon Lee's suicide although Grant noted that it is also uplifting and gives an optimistic feeling in its chorus, while also giving a hypnotic feel alongside stating that the piano in the verses gives "a kind of haunting melody". Other tracks on the album that did not see a single release such as "Morning Life" was a track Grant wanted to be "very atmospheric", and "something that would be great when you are driving around in your car", while also wanting it to have a "cinematic intro". Grant later claimed that "Morning Life" was a track many of the band's fans started to "pick up on" after buying the album, and also said "another version is a possibility". "Pilgrim Soul", the eighth track on the album was described by Grant as its most heaviest and said it will appeal to older fans. He said the album needed the track to "give it a lift at the end of the record" and that the "sing-a-long chorus" is what makes a song work. The chorus was explained as positive and the verses as dark, with the answer to the verses revealed in the chorus.

The album closes with two similarly sounding tracks titled "Pain on Pain" and "Dove Grey Sands". Grant stated he wanted the album to end so the listener wanted the album to last longer, but also leave the listener with the feeling that "you have been on a really nice journey" and that it "felt like the perfect outro". It also "evolves round the acoustic guitar". "Pain on Pain" on the other hand was seen as "quite a different track" for the band and "felt very uplifting". The music has no guitars in it but "just a few little odd bits" and was also described by Grant as having "a real sell out vocal".

== Critical reception ==
Professional ratings
Review scores
Source	Rating
BBC.co.uk	(favorable)
Classic Rock	3/5 stars
Dotmusic	6/10 stars
Drowned in Sound	4/10 stars
The Guardian	2/5 stars
Kerrang!	2/5 stars
NME	4/10
Q	4/5 stars
Teraz Rock	4/5 stars
Uncut	4/10 stars

Pushing the Senses received mixed reviews from music critics. In a review for Dotmusic, Chris Heath said that "Feeder are in danger of being a schizophrenic band, unrecognisable from their once 'trademark' sound and prone to style swings on a whim." The Guardian said the album was a "kind of emotional aural soup that will baffle the spikier members of their original punky fanbase". However, Q magazine reviewer Paul Brannigan was impressed, and wrote that the album could "Finally establish Feeder as major league players". Metacritic, a website which aggregates the albums reviews from selected publications, gives an overall score of 52/100 indicating "Mixed or average reviews" from a total of six. Grant said that positive reviews are good to have, "but at the end of the day do not sell records". In a 2008 interview with Kerrang!, Grant expressed his annoyance with the Coldplay comparisons, in which he said they were only made because he played a piano on the album. Kerrang! were brutal towards the band for all of their reviews, with Ben Meyers referring to them as a "radio friendly unit shifter", including comparisons to a "pastel box". A year later the album was marked as "Avoid" in a round-up of the band's material, which included the usual Coldplay and Keane comparisons the album suffered on release, although still conceded that the album is Feeder's most successful. Classic Rock review was more forgiving, considering the album a way "to exorcise the ghosts of the past and ultimately move onward, into a brighter future". In mid-2005, Grant said to an interviewer as part of a Kerrang radio documentary, that he was "pissed off" at the review their magazine counterpart gave the album, before stating it was "unfair and reviewed by the wrong person".

In a review for BBC.co.uk, Lisa Haines praised the sound of Pushing the Senses, stating "The brand of raucous rock anthem which catapulted them to fame is virtually absent here, the band's new sound is far more thoughtful and understated. 'Feeling A Moment' and 'Tumble And Fall' are prime examples. Both have Coldplay inspired soaring vocals and catchy melodies, but a little of their lyrical hand wringing seems to have crept in too", and later said "That's not to say the album is bad, because there is a lot to like here. 'Pilgrim Soul' and title track 'Pushing The Senses' see Feeder thrash furiously away at their instruments, which should appease those who prefer their earlier work".

Q magazine included the album in its list of the top fifty albums of 2005, ranking it at number thirty-nine with the second single "Feeling a Moment" being voted the ninety-eighth best track of the year by their readers. At the 2005 Kerrang! Awards, Feeder received a nomination for "Best British Band", the same award they won two years previously. In December 2005, the album won the "Best Album" category at the Welsh Music Awards, a category considered the pre-successor to the Welsh Music Prize, although this was voted on by online public vote, as opposed to a judging panel.

== Chart performance and sales ==
Pushing the Senses debuted on the UK albums chart, at their highest chart position to date at number two (blocked from the top position by Athlete's Tourist), and sold 42,951 copies. The album remained on the chart for fifteen weeks, which was much less than the 36 spent on the chart by Comfort in Sound. The album reached the top one-hundred in The Netherlands, Austria, Switzerland, Flanders and Japan with a top twenty appearance in the Republic of Ireland. Pushing the Senses became Feeder's first release to chart on the top twenty of the European Top 100 Albums, where it peaked at number eleven. Although the overall performance of the album was less than what was anticipated by Echo, it is still alongside The Singles their most successful release in terms of peak chart position.

== Track listing ==
All tracks are written by Grant Nicholas.

No.	Title	Length
1.	"Feeling a Moment"	4:08
2.	"Bitter Glass"	4:34
3.	"Tumble and Fall"	4:19
4.	"Tender"	4:14
5.	"Pushing the Senses"	3:28
6.	"Frequency"	3:09
7.	"Morning Life"	4:02
8.	"Pilgrim Soul"	3:44
9.	"Pain on Pain"	4:04
10.	"Dove Grey Sands"	4:37

Japanese release bonus tracks
No.	Title	Length
11.	"Shatter"	2:58
12.	"Victoria"	4:03

=== DVD tracks and footage ===
All DVD tracks and footage appear on the United Kingdom, Japanese and European CD/DVD editions of Pushing the Senses.

- "Tender" (The Depot Sessions)
- "Dove Grey Sands" (The Depot Sessions)
- "Pushing The Senses" (The Depot Sessions)
- "Bitter Glass" (The Depot Sessions)
- "Pushing the Boundaries" (Documentary)
- "Tumble and Fall" : The Video Diaries (includes the video)
- "Victoria" (5.1 Mix and Lyrics Screen)

== Personnel ==
The following people contributed to Pushing the Senses:

- Grant Nicholas – lead vocals, backing vocals, lead guitar, piano and cello arranging
- Taka Hirose – bass
- Mark Richardson – drums
- Fran Healy and Dougie Payne – backing vocals ("Tumble and Fall")
- Audrey Riley – cello and cello arranging
- Gil Norton, Grant Nicholas and Ken Nelson – producers
- John Dunne, Matt Sime, and Mark Phythian – programming and engineering
- Adrian Bushby – mixing and additional engineering
- Chris Blair – mastering
- Ryan Wallace – set design
- Blue Source – art direction
- Lawrence Watson – photography

== Release history ==
The album was released in three versions: a single disc version, a gatefold 12-inch vinyl, and a double disc version which included the album on one disc and the DVD extras on the other. The first disc is a standard stereo CD while the second disc, which is a DVD-Video, contains a documentary on the recording of the album, a 5.1 stereo mix and lyric screen for "Victoria" and a short film documenting the making of the music video for "Tumble and Fall". A series of depot sessions in which selected tracks from the album are performed, completes the set.

Region	Date	Label	Format(s)	Catalog
United Kingdom and Ireland	31 January 2005	Echo	CD, CD/DVD, LP, Digital download	ECHCD60/ECHDV60/ECHLP60
Europe	31 January 2005	PIAS	CD, CD/DVD, LP, Digital download	ECHCD60/ECHDV60/ECHLP60
Australia and New Zealand	31 January 2005	Liberation Music	CD, CD/DVD, LP, Digital download	LIBCD7156.2
Japan	31 January 2005	Pony Canyon	CD, CD/DVD, LP, Digital download	PCCY-01725

== Charts ==
Charts (2005)	Peak position
Austrian Albums Chart	62
Dutch Albums Chart	80
Flanders Albums Chart	61
European Top 100 Albums	11
Irish Albums Chart	16
Japanese Albums Chart	59
Swiss Albums Chart	75
UK Albums Chart	2
