= Goodnight (Babybird song) =

Single by Babybird

from the album Ugly Beautiful
- Released: 29 July 1996
- Genre: Indie rock; Britpop
- Length: 2:54
- Label: Echo
- Songwriter(s): Stephen Jones

Babybird singles chronology
"Snake Caves / Baby Lemonade" (1995)	"Goodnight" (1996)	"You're Gorgeous" (1996)

Goodnight is a 1996 single by Babybird, released from the album Ugly Beautiful. The song originally appeared on Stephen Jones' solo album Fatherhood, which had been released the previous December (where it was spelled "Good Night"), but was later re-recorded with a full band after Babybird were signed to Echo Records. The single was a minor hit on the UK Singles Chart, peaking at #28.

== Track listing ==
1. "Goodnight"
2. "July"
3. "Harry & Ida Swap Teeth"
4. "July 2"
5. "Girl with Money"
6. "Shellfish"
