= Back Together Again (disambiguation) =

Back Together Again is an album by Fred Anderson with Hamid Drake.

Back Together Again may refer to:

- "Back Together Again", a 1976 song by Daryl Hall & John Oates from Bigger Than Both of Us
- "Back Together Again", a 1979 song by Roberta Flack and Donny Hathaway from Roberta Flack Featuring Donny Hathaway
