= Magic (music magazine) =

French music magazine

- Managing Editor: Christophe Basterra
- Categories: Monthly Music Magazine
- Founded: 1995
- Country: France
- Based in: Paris
- Language: French
- Website: Magic

Magic is a French music magazine which is released on a monthly basis. It was formed out of the ashes of a small fanzine produced by music aficionados from France in 1995. The magazine's target readership is composed of young adults, students and young professionals who are keen to pursue the latest fashionable trend in music (and other forms of culture).
