= Steven Lindsay =

Canadian outlaw biker and gangster

- Born: 1964 (age 61–62); Ontario, Canada
- Other name: "Tiger"
- Occupations: Outlaw biker, gangster
- Years active: 1987–
- Allegiance: Para-Dice Riders MC (1987–2000); Hells Angels MC (2000)
- Convictions: Extortion and gangsterism (2004)
- Penalty: 4 years' imprisonment (2005)

Steven Lindsay (born 1964), better known as "Tiger" Lindsay, is a Canadian outlaw biker and gangster involved in an important legal case to the Hells Angels Motorcycle Club declared a criminal organization in Canada.

== Para-Dice Riders ==
Lindsay joined the Para-Dice Riders outlaw biker club in 1987. He was known as one of the more violent members of the Para-Dice Riders, being described by George Coussens of the Ontario Provincial Police (OPP)'s Anti-Biker Enforcement Unit as: "he's a big, intimidating person, well respected by all the bikers". Lindsay along with his common-law wife were the co-owners of a bar in Woodbridge while he also worked as a bouncer at the Red Pepper bar. The journalists Julian Sher and William Marsden wrote: "Over six feet tall and weighing about 230 pounds, Lindsay looked almost like a Viking". Lindsay shaved the sides of his head bald, kept the rest of his reddish blonde hair in a ponytail and had a pointed beard that went down to his chest. One man who knew Lindsay who did wish to be named told Sher and Marsden: "He'd kick your ass as soon as look at you. He was tough, he talked tough".

== Hells Angels ==
In 2000, the Hells Angels national president Walter "Nurget" Stadnick offered the Ontario biker gangs the chance to join the Hells Angels on a "patch-for-patch" basis, allowing them to join the Hells Angels with patches equivalent to their current patches. On 29 December 2000, Lindsay along with the rest of the Para-Dice Riders joined the Hells Angels. At the ceremony at the clubhouse of the Hells Angels "mother chapter" in Sorel, Lindsay burned his Para-Dice Rider jacket and put on a jacket with the Hells Angels death head patch. At the ceremony, Lindsay saw Coussens, stepped in front of him, and told him in a very aggressive manner: "How ya doin', George?"

On 23 January 2002, Lindsay along with Raymond Bonner visited the home of a black-market satellite dealer in Barrie. Lindsay was unhappy with the satellite dish the dealer had sold for the Hells Angels clubhouse in Woodbridge. Both Angels had arrived at the man's house wearing their death's head patches and demanded the dealer pay them $75,000 as a "tax" to be allowed to continue his black market work. Lindsay was dressed in boots saying "Hells Angels North Toronto", wore a belt saying "Hells Angels", a T-shirt saying "Hells Angels Singen" (a reference to a Hells Angels chapter in Germany) and a necklace whose pendant was the Hells Angels death head. Instead of paying, the dealer contacted the police and wore a wire when Lindsay and Bonner returned. The wire recorded Lindsay as making threats and he told the black market dealer that he should pay the $75,000 "tax" because the money belonged to him plus "five other guys that are fucking the same kind of motherfucker as I am". Lindsay was recorded as saying the dealer's "days were numbered", that he "was in trouble", and finally that he was "lucky to be standing there”. The fact that Lindsay was speaking not as an individual, but as representing the Hells Angels led the police to charge him on 31 January 2002 with gangsterism.

At the same time, the police started an investigation of Lindsay who had gone into business with Juan Ramon Fernandez, a twice deported Spanish man who served as the Rizzuto family's agent for Ontario. On 29 January 2002, Fernandez told Lindsay he much preferred to do business with the Nomad chapter, whose members almost were all arrested as a result of Operation Springtime and felt that Vito Rizzuto should have imposed a truce in the Quebec biker war much earlier than when he actually did in September 2000. Lindsay then launched a violent rant against Toronto mayor Mel Lastman for turning his back on the Hells Angels after he was photographed shaking hands with one of them. Lindsay then told Fernandez that he had beaten up someone who owned the Hells Angels money. Fernandez then told Lindsay that he was thinking about having Constantin "Big Gus" Alevizos killed, saying he would have Pietro Scarcella kill Alevizos for the Rizzuto family.

=== The Lindsay trial ===
The Crown Attorney in charge of prosecuting Lindsay, Graeme Cameron, decided to press for C-95 charges against Lindsay as part of a bid to have the Hells Angels declared a criminal organization in Canada. Cameron faced a difficult case as he to prove on behalf of the Crown that Lindsay had committed extortion; that he done so on behalf of the Hells Angels; and finally the Hells Angels were a criminal organization that posed as a motorcycle club instead of a being a genuine motorcycle club that just happened to have some criminal members as the Hells Angels claimed. Sher and Marsden wrote that Cameron had a "shaky" case against Lindsay and most legal experts expected the case to end in an acquittal. The Hells Angels were well aware of the importance of the case and hired the most expensive lawyers in Ontario to defend Lindsay. In effect, the Hells Angels were on trial in the Lindsay case.

During the trial, the defense lawyers attacked the reputation of the victim of the extortion attempt as a shady businessman who made his living selling black market satellites whose word was not to be trusted. The defense lawyers depicted C-95 as a violation of the Charter of Rights and Freedoms as the defense claimed to brand the Hells Angels as a criminal organization because of Lindsay's crimes was absurd. One of Lindsay's lawyers told the courtroom: "We would not the nerve to brand the Chinese or Italian communities as criminal because of the actions of a few". Finally, the defense argued that the Hells Angels just a motorcycle club that was being persecuted by the Crown. To counter the defense, Cameron brought in numerous policeman, journalists, and scholars who all testified that the Hells Angels were a criminal organization. Cameron argued to the court that the Hells Angels were "a homogenous, unified organization in Canada" who engaged in selling drugs, loansharking and extortion. The trial lasted six months, which was unusual by Canadian standards where trials typically last a month or two.

=== C-95 conviction ===
In September 2004, Lindsay and Bonner were convicted of extortion along with gangsterism, marking the first time that any Hells Angels had been convicted of the charge. Justice Michelle Fuerst in convicting Lindsay and Bonner wrote that: "Both Mr. Lindsay and Mr. Bonner went to the victim's house wearing jackets bearing the primary symbols of the HAMC [Hells Angels Motorcycle Club], the name 'Hells Angels', and the death head logo. They presented themselves not as individuals, but as members of a group with a reputation for violence and intimidation. They deliberately invoked their membership in the HAMC with the intent to inspire fear in the victim. They committed extortion with the intent to do so in association with a criminal organization, the HAMC to which they belonged". Furest ruled:" "It simply defies common sense that a group so deeply involved with crimes in Quebec would have any interest in establishing benign counterparts in a neighboring province". Fuerest ruled that the Hells Angels were a criminal syndicate not just in Quebec, but in all of Canada.

The ruling was notable as the first convictions under the C-95 law, which created the new offense of gangsterism, which was defined as committing crimes on behalf of a criminal organization and was the first time that the courts had ever declared that the Hells Angels are a criminal organization that merely masquerades as a motorcycle club. Fuerst's ruling meant that an additional penalty of 14 years in prison could be imposed on Hells Angels for crimes committed on behalf of their group was considered to be a major legal blow against the Hells Angels. Lindsay launched an appeal of the verdict as he claimed that the C-95 law was unconstitutional and violated his rights. On 29 September 2005, Lindsay was sentenced to four years in prison. Lindsay was convicted of extortion and was sentenced to four years in prison. Because he engaged in extortion as a Hells Angel, he was sentenced to additional two years in prison, giving him six years in total.

In April 2008, Lindsay was sent to prison after he violated his parole conditions by living outside of Barrie. On 2 July 2009, the Ontario Court of Appeals upheld Justice Fuerst's ruling. The Court of Appeal ruled: "Put bluntly, the trial judge’s reasoning on this issue was impeccable and her conclusion is the antithesis of unreasonableness". The Lindsay case was considered significant because had the case been decided in Lindsay's favor, the C-95 law would have been struck down as unconstitutional.

== Books ==
- Auger, Michel; Edwards, Peter (2012). The Encyclopedia of Canadian Organized Crime: From Captain Kidd to Mom Boucher. Toronto: McClelland & Stewart. ISBN 978-0771030499.
- Cédilot, André; Noël, André (2012). Mafia Inc.: The Long, Bloody Reign of Canada's Sicilian Clan. Toronto: Vintage Canada. ISBN 9780307360410.
- Sher, Julian; Marsden, William (2003). The Road To Hell How the Biker Gangs Are Conquering Canada. Toronto: Alfred Knopf. ISBN 0-676-97598-4.
- Sher, Julian; Marsden, William (2006). Angels of Death: Inside the Bikers' Empire of Crime. Toronto: Alfred Knopf Canada. ISBN 9780307370327.
- Langton, Jerry (2010). Showdown: How the Outlaws, Hells Angels and Cops Fought for Control of the Streets. Toronto: John Wiley & Sons. ISBN 978-0470678787.
