= Subcircus =

Britpop band from London (1994 – c. 2000)

- Origin: London, England
- Genre: Britpop
- Years active: 1994 – c. 2000
- Label: Echo
- Past members: Peter Bradley; Nikolaj Bloch; Tommas Arnby; George Brown

Subcircus were a Britpop band from London. They had two singles reach the UK singles chart in 1997.

== Career ==
Peter Bradley formed Subcircus in late 1994. The rest of the band was made up of Nikolaj Bloch (guitar), whom Bradley found through an advert in Melody Maker, the latter's drumming friend and Danish compatriot Tommas Arnby, and George Brown (bass).

Their first concert was in York, England, in 1995. By May 1996, Subcircus had played more than 150 shows throughout the UK, headlining two nightclub tours and opening for Echo & the Bunnymen, Suede, Elvis Costello, Grant Lee Buffalo, Stereophonics and Ocean Colour Scene.

Their debut album, Carousel, was recorded in London at AIR Studios, and at Peter Gabriel's Real World Studios in Bath, Somerset. It was issued in the UK by the independent label Echo in 1996 and drew critical raves from the UK press. Through 1997, the band released the singles "86'd" and "U Love U". Later in the year, "86'd" was re-released along with the album which featured a new track sequence. "I heard them on the Evening Session and I thought they sounded fantastic," stated Radiohead's Ed O'Brien; "I've listened to the album a couple of times and I still can't hear that they sound like us, not at all."

Subcircus was quiet for over two years but reappeared in 1999 with the single "Do You Feel Loved". This was followed by support slots for label mates Feeder in October. In 2000, on Valentine's Day, the band issued a new single, "Sixty Second Love Affair". In March, their second full-length album, Are You Receiving?, was released to indifferent reviews.

== Discography ==
=== Albums ===
- Carousel (1996)
- Are You Receiving? (2000)

=== Singles ===
- "You Love You" (1997) – UK No. 61
- "86'd" (1997) – UK No. 56
- "Do You Feel Loved" (1999) – UK No. 84
- "For Those Who Cannot Weep" (1999)
- "Sixty Second Love Affair" (2000)
