= Tumble and Fall =

2005 single by Feeder

Single by Feeder

from the album Pushing the Senses
- B-side: "Victoria"
- Released: 17 January 2005
- Length: 4:20
- Label: Echo
- Songwriter: Grant Nicholas
- Producers: Gil Norton; Grant Nicholas

Feeder singles chronology
| "Comfort in Sound" (2003) | "Tumble and Fall" (2005) | "Feeling a Moment" (2005) |

"Tumble and Fall" is a single released from Welsh rock band Feeder's fifth studio album, Pushing the Senses (2005). It reached number five on the UK Singles Chart, becoming the group's highest-placing single along with "Buck Rogers". It is also their highest-charting song in Ireland, where it reached number 26 to become Feeder's only top-30 hit.

The song features backing vocals from Fran Healy and Dougie Payne from Scottish rock band Travis, who both sing the backing vocals in the final chorus. It was revealed by Healy that the band were recording what would be their fifth studio album The Boy With No Name in a nearby studio room. At the same time Feeder were recording what would be Pushing the Senses and ended up working with Feeder for this track.

CD1 of the single features the popular "Shatter", which was later released as a single itself after a fans petition was put forward, and was planned to be on the album but was finally not included as the record company believed it wouldn't fit in with the feel of the rest of the album, despite Grant Nicholas' protests.

== Track listings ==
UK CD1

1. "Tumble and Fall"
2. "Shatter"
3. "Tumble and Fall" (acoustic)
4. "Tumble and Fall" (video)

UK CD2 and 7-inch single

1. "Tumble and Fall"
2. "Victoria"

Australian and New Zealand CD single

1. "Tumble and Fall"
2. "Shatter"
3. "Tumble and Fall" (acoustic)
4. "Victoria"

== Charts ==
| Chart (2005) | Peak position |
|---|---|
| Europe (Eurochart Hot 100) | 20 |
| Ireland (IRMA) | 26 |
| Scottish Singles Sales (Official Charts) | 7 |
| UK Singles (Official Charts) | 5 |
| UK Indie (Official Charts) | 1 |
