= You're Gorgeous =

1996 single by Babybird

Single by Babybird

from the album Ugly Beautiful
- B-side: "You're Gorgeous Too"; "Hing King Blues"; "KW Jesus TV Roof Appeal"; "Bébé Limonade"; "Ooh Yeah"; "Carcrash"
- Released: 30 September 1996
- Genre: Pop
- Length: 3:44
- Label: Echo
- Songwriter: Stephen Jones
- Producers: Stephen Jones; Steve Power

Babybird singles chronology
"Goodnight" (1996)	"You're Gorgeous" (1996)	"Candy Girl" (1997)

Music video
- "You're Gorgeous" on YouTube

"You're Gorgeous" is a song by English band Babybird, released as a commercial single by The Echo Label on 30 September 1996. Babybird member Stephen Jones wrote the song and co-produced it with Steve Power. It was their only top-10 hit on the UK Singles Chart, peaking at number three, and reached the top 40 in Australia, Iceland, Ireland, Israel, Italy, New Zealand and Sweden. Melody Maker ranked "You're Gorgeous" at number 11 on their list of the "Singles of the Year" for 1996.

== Background and composition ==
The song's lyrics are interpreted to describe the way a photographer exploits his models. The track is often mistaken as a love song due to the way it is initially presented, with one person complimenting the other until it is revealed that the narrator is a female model speaking to the photographer.

== Critical reception ==
Stephen Thomas Erlewine from AllMusic (who gave the Ugly Beautiful album 4.5 stars out of 5) praised the song as an "effortlessly catchy" pop single, which "positively radiates with twisted sexuality". The Independent wrote, "Take the hit single "You're Gorgeous" – ostensibly a love ballad of warm togetherness, but, like REM's "The One I Love", actually carrying more sinister undercurrents. In this case, its the song's pitiable account of pornographic devotion – having ice-cubes rubbed on chests, being photographed with legs pulled apart on car bonnets, and being paid £20 with vague promises of being seen in a magazine – all endured for infatuation's sake, because the snapper is so gorgeous."

Kevin Courtney from Irish Times named it a "catchy, slightly risque surprise hit". Ian Watson from Melody Maker was negative, saying, "This single starts haughty, moves onto vain and ends up sickeningly narcissistic, with the stupid singer bloke directing the central you're gorgeous line to his own sneering monkey face in the shattered mirror." Another Melody Maker editor, Caitlin Moran, wrote that the lyrics, "with their Legs pulled apart and ice rubbed on your chest, are about sticky porny photographers hunting beaver shots from models. Steve's quietly, humorously and hornily feminist: Will you lick my candy, girl (And I don't mean that rudely)? gives you a fairly good idea of his world-view." A reviewer from Music Week gave it four out of five, adding, "Filling the void between Vic Reeves and Bono, Stephen Jones's rich baritone is a svelte joy on this rather flimsy tale of tank tops and snapshots."

== Impact and legacy ==
In December 1996, British magazine Melody Maker ranked "You're Gorgeous" at number 11 on their list of "Singles of the Year", writing, "Tipping the conventional paean to physical perfection on its arse, Sheffield's bedsit balladeer Steve Jones came up trumps with this tale of a (male) model whose strings are pulled by a (female) photographer."

== Track listings ==
All songs were written by Stephen Jones.

- UK CD1
1. "You're Gorgeous"
2. "You're Gorgeous Too"
3. "Hing King Blues"
4. "KW Jesus TV Roof Appeal"
- UK CD2
1. "You're Gorgeous"
2. "Bébé Limonade"
3. "Ooh Yeah"
4. "Carcrash"
- UK 7-inch gold vinyl single

A1. "You're Gorgeous"
B1. "You're Gorgeous Too"
B2. "Bébé Limonade"

- UK cassette single

A1. "You're Gorgeous"
A2. "You're Gorgeous Too"
B1. "You're Gorgeous"
B2. "Bébé Limonade"

- European and Australian CD single
1. "You're Gorgeous"
2. "Bébé Limonade" (featuring Olivia Trench)
3. "You're Gorgeous Too"
4. "Carcrash"

== Charts ==
=== Weekly charts ===
Chart (1996–1998)	Peak position
Australia (ARIA)	28
Belgium (Ultratip Bubbling Under Flanders)	14
Europe (Eurochart Hot 100)	30
France (SNEP)	42
Germany (GfK)	74
Iceland (Íslenski Listinn Topp 40)	2
Ireland (IRMA)	16
Israel (Israeli Singles Chart)	8
Italy (Musica e dischi)	18
New Zealand (Recorded Music NZ)	22
Scottish Singles Sales (Official Charts)	7
Sweden (Sverigetopplistan)	17
UK Singles (Official Charts)	3
UK Indie (Music Week)	1

=== Year-end charts ===
Chart (1996)	Position
UK Singles (OCC)	30
UK Airplay (Music Week)	39

Chart (1997)	Position
Iceland (Íslenski Listinn Topp 40)	88

== Certifications ==
Region	Certification	Certified units/sales
United Kingdom (BPI)	Platinum	600,000^{‡}
^{‡} Sales+streaming figures based on certification alone.

== Release history ==
Region	Date	Format(s)	Label(s)	Ref.
United Kingdom	30 September 1996	CD; cassette	Echo	
United States	31 October 1997	Modern rock; triple A radio	Atlantic	
United States	13 January 1998	Contemporary hit radio	Atlantic	
