= U-MYX =

Music software

U-MYX was a music format launched in 2004 which allowed a user to arrange and create their own mix of songs by known music artists. The U-MYX Software is available on CDs (usually on the artist's single release as an Enhanced Section on the CD) and was available as digital downloads from U-MYX's own digital store. Digital U-MYX Sales were UK Chart eligible and counted towards the artist's chart position. U-MYX changed its name to GoMix in 2009.

== U-MYX Player ==
The U-MYX Player (v.3.1) with the track "Headlock" by Imogen Heap loaded.

Users can create and play back U-MYX files using the U-MYX Player application. The U-MYX Player arranges the song in a grid format, divided into Tracks and Sections. Users can turn individual blocks on and off (muting the instruments), adjust the volume curves of tracks, copy, paste, insert and delete sections in order to create their own mix of the track.

The U-MYX player is a standalone application that requires no installation on the host computer. The application loads in .UMX data files which contain the songs audio and graphics. The .UMX data files vary in size depending on the track with the average song being approximately 20 megabytes. While the U-MYX player is no longer available to download, it is available fully functional on releases such as the MVI edition of Riot! by Paramore with the export/share-online features no longer working.

== Communities and microsites ==
U-MYX Streaming Player.

Each U-MYX Track had its own Microsite where users of the software could download, rate and comment on remixes made by other people with the full length U-MYX Player for that track. Users were able to save their mixes as a proprietary format .umx file which could then be uploaded and shared with the rest of the community. Once a U-MYX was uploaded to the microsite, a Flash-based streaming player was automatically generated a few minutes later which users could embed into a web page allowing others who did not have the U-MYX software to hear their mix.

U-MYX offered free, heavily cut-down clips of new chart releases in U-MYX format. U-MYX Clips usually featured roughly 30 seconds of a song and did not allow for saving or exporting.

== Limitations ==
The U-MYX Software does not allow the user to add their own audio files/samples to the track, and not all songs allow export to .WAV or .MP3 format depending on the artist or record label preference.
