= Babybird =

English rock band

- Origin: Sheffield, England
- Genres: Alternative; lo-fi; indie rock; electronic
- Years active: 1995–2000, 2005–2013, 2015–present
- Labels: Baby Bird Recordings, Echo, Unison Music, RW/FF Recordings
- Members: Stephen Jones; Danny Lowe; Robert Gregory; Luke Scott
- Past members: Huw Chadbourn; John Pedder; Matt Hay
- Website: www.babybird.info

Babybird are an English rock band from Sheffield centred on songwriter Stephen Jones. Jones began releasing collections of his home recordings under the name Baby Bird in 1995, before recruiting Huw Chadbourn, Robert Gregory, John Pedder and Luke Scott to form a band under the slightly altered name Babybird. After signing to Echo Records, the band achieved their commercial breakthrough with the 1996 single "You're Gorgeous", which reached number three on the UK Singles Chart and charted internationally.

After two further albums for Echo, There's Something Going On and Bugged, Babybird were dropped by the label following the poor sales of Bugged and subsequently split. The band later reformed and released three further albums between 2006 and 2011. Jones resumed using the Babybird name in 2015 and re-established it as a live band in 2017, while continuing to release music independently.

== Career ==
Stephen Jones was born in Telford, Shropshire and spent most of his childhood living in New Zealand. He studied acting at Nottingham Trent University, where he began writing songs and recording home demos as part of an experimental theatre group called Dogs in Honey. By 1994, Jones was based in Sheffield, where he had amassed up to 400 songs on 200 cassette tapes. At the urging of friends, he signed a publishing deal with Chrysalis Music, but efforts to release his music were turned down by several labels and A&R representatives, including Nick Beggs of Kajagoogoo. In July 1995, Jones self-released the first collection of these demos, I Was Born a Man, under the name Baby Bird. He recruited a band made up of Huw Chadbourn (keyboards), Robert Gregory (drums), John Pedder (bass) and Luke Scott (guitar), under the slightly tweaked moniker of Babybird, in order to tour and promote his work.

=== Commercial release ===
During 1995, two further albums of demo recordings were released under the name Baby Bird (Bad Shave and Fatherhood) and two in 1996 (The Happiest Man Alive and Dying Happy). Babybird were signed to Echo Records (a division of the Chrysalis Group), and the first authentic single, a full-band recording of "Goodnight", which had appeared in demo form on Fatherhood, was released in July 1996, becoming a minor hit in the UK Singles Chart.

The group's second single, "You're Gorgeous", reached number 3 in the UK in October 1996, and was one of the biggest selling singles of the year, going on to chart around the world. Jones has declared it is a feminist song. However, for its message, it presented a more commercial face to the public in comparison to Jones's earlier work, as well as in comparison to the rest of the material on the Ugly Beautiful album. The album produced two more hit singles in "Candy Girl" and "Cornershop".

In 1997 the band returned to the studio, with producer Darren Allison. They recorded two new tracks - a brand new version of "Bad Shave", and a re-working of "CFC". These new tracks were included on the 1997 U.S. release of Ugly Beautiful.

Babybird returned, minus keyboardist Huw Chadbourn, in 1998 with There's Something Going On, preceded by a single, "Bad Old Man". The album was a modest success and was followed by further minor hits, "If You'll Be Mine" and "Back Together".

In 2000, a line-up of Babybird comprising Jones, Scott and Matt Hay created a third album. Bugged. Sales were poor and the two singles from it, "The F-Word" (later the theme tune to Gordon Ramsay's UK TV cookery show of the same name) and "Out of Sight" barely dented the charts. Babybird were dropped by their record label soon after. A third single from the album, "Fireflies" / "Getaway" was released on Animal Noise Records, but sold few copies. The band subsequently split.

Jones went on to write fiction, release solo work and score a film, Blessed, in 2004. In October 2005, a posting on the Babybird website announced that the band had reformed as a three-piece featuring Jones, Scott and Robert Gregory. An album, Between My Ears There Is Nothing But Music was released on 25 September 2006.

=== Reformation 2006–2012, 2015–present ===
In August 2009, it was announced that the band would be doing a tour of four gigs in November 2009 to promote the album Ex-Maniac, which was released in February 2010. The line-up consisted of Jones, Scott and Gregory, with a cameo appearance from long-term fan Johnny Depp on the track "Unloveable". Depp also directed the music video. The following year, Babybird released the album The Pleasures of Self Destruction.

In 2013, Stephen Jones announced via his Twitter feed that Babybird was no more. He launched his own site at Bandcamp, and released a number of albums under aliases such as "Black Reindeer", "Deluder", "Arthritis Kid", "The Great Sadness" and "Trucker".

In 2015, Jones started trading under the Babybird name again, reforming the band as a live unit in 2017 and in early 2019, toured as support to Dodgy with his new line-up. A number of Babybird tracks from 2015 onwards were released on 1 March 2019 as a compilation album Happy Stupid Nothing. Just a few months later, it was announced that another album Photosynthesis would be released in July 2019. As well as these, Jones has been releasing a prolific amount of new Babybird albums via Bandcamp, often selling them as unique limited edition CDs.

== Discography ==
=== Studio albums ===
Year	Album details	Chart positions		Certifications (sales thresholds)
Year	Album details	UK	NZ	Certifications (sales thresholds)
1995	I Was Born a Man (as Baby Bird): Released: July 1995; Labels: Baby Bird Recordings	—	—	
1995	Bad Shave (as Baby Bird): Released: 5 October 1995; Labels: Baby Bird Recordings	—	—	
1995	Fatherhood (as Baby Bird): Released: December 1995; Labels: Baby Bird Recordings	—	—	
1996	The Happiest Man Alive (as Baby Bird): Released: 1 April 1996; Labels: Baby Bird Recordings	127	—	
1996	Dying Happy (as Baby Bird): Released: 27 May 1996; Labels: Baby Bird Recordings	—	—	
1996	Ugly Beautiful: Released: 21 October 1996; Labels: Echo	9	15	BPI: Gold
1998	There's Something Going On: Released: 24 August 1998; Labels: Echo	28	—	
2000	Bugged: Released: 12 June 2000; Labels: Echo	104	—	
2006	Between My Ears There Is Nothing But Music: Released: 25 September 2006; Labels: Baby Bird Recordings	—	—	
2010	Ex-Maniac: Released: 1 March 2010; Labels: Unison Music	186	—	
2011	The Pleasures of Self Destruction: Released: 31 October 2011; Labels: Unison Music	—	—	
2015	The Last Album: Released: 8 May 2015; Labels: Self-released	—	—	
2015	Back to the Womb: Released: 3 July 2015; Labels: Self-released	—	—	
2016	Life After Death: Released: 8 June 2016; Labels: Self-released	—	—	
2016	Take My Air: Released: 22 November 2016; Labels: Self-released	—	—	
2017	The Wrong Words: Released: 25 January 2017; Labels: Self-released	—	—	
2017	I Miss Myself: Released: 17 March 2017; Labels: Self-released	—	—	
2017	I Miss Myself 2: Released: 17 March 2017; Labels: Self-released	—	—	
2017	People Do Stupid Things: Released: 18 June 2017; Labels: Self-released	—	—	
2017	King of Nothing Part One: Released: November 2017; Labels: Self-released	—	—	
2018	King of Nothing Part Two: Released: 4 January 2018; Labels: Self-released	—	—	
2018	Selfies Inside The Coffin: Released: October 2018; Labels: Self-released	—	—	
2019	NOTPOP/Toothpaste For The Soul: Released: February 2019; Labels: Self-released	—	—	
2019	Photosynthesis: Released: 19 July 2019; Labels: RW/FF Recordings	—	—	

=== Compilation albums ===
Year	Album details
1997	The Greatest Hits (as Baby Bird): Released: 30 August 1997; Labels: Baby Bird Recordings
2002	The Original Lo-Fi (boxset) (as Baby Bird): Released: 18 November 2002; Labels: Sanctuary
2004	Best of Babybird: Released: 16 February 2004; Labels: Echo
2012	The Original Lo-Fi Greatest Hits: Released: 25 October 2012; Labels: Self-released
2013	Outtakes: Released: 10 January 2013; Labels: Self-released
2014	A Personal Lo-Fi Mixtape: Part One (as Baby Bird): Released: 1 July 2014; Labels: Self-released
2014	A Personal Lo-Fi Mixtape: Part Two (as Baby Bird): Released: 1 July 2014; Labels: Self-released
2015	Roadkiller: Released: 17 January 2015; Labels: Self-released
2015	Roadtripper: Released: 23 January 2015; Labels: Self-released
2015	Roadfiller: Released: 23 January 2015; Labels: Self-released
2015	Road: Released: 3 February 2015; Labels: Self-released
2015	Missing Lofi Part One: Released: 13 February 2015; Labels: Self-released
2015	Rehearsal Tapes: Released: 15 February 2015; Labels: Self-released
2015	Missing Lofi 2: Released: 21 February 2015; Labels: Self-released
2015	Missing Lofi 3: Songs: Released: 10 April 2015; Labels: Self-released
2015	Missing Lofi 3: Soundtracks: Released: 10 April 2015; Labels: Self-released
2015	Last Album Outtakes: Released: 15 May 2015; Labels: Self-released
2015	Fatherhood2 (as Baby Bird): Released: 26 June 2015; Labels: Self-released
2016	People Do Stupid Things: Released: 1 July 2016; Labels: Self-released
2017	KONpilation: Released: 22 December 2017; Labels: Self-released
2019	Happy Stupid Nothing: Released: 1 March 2019; Labels: Psycho Mafia Recordings

=== Live albums ===
Year	Album details
2012	Live at the Electric Ballroom Bootleg 1996: Released: 30 October 2012; Labels: Self-released
2015	Live Sessions 1995–8 Volume One: Released: 27 February 2015; Labels: Self-released
2015	Live Sessions 1995–8 Volume 2: Released: 27 February 2015; Labels: Self-released
2015	Cambridge Junction 1998: Released: 29 May 2015; Labels: Self-released
2015	Babybird Live in Vienna 2000: Released: 16 October 2015; Labels: Self-released
2018	Babybird Live in Koln at the Luxor: Released: 24 January 2018; Labels: Self-released

=== Singles ===
Year	Title	Peak chart positions							Certifications	Album
Year	Title	UK	AUS	FRA	GER	IRE	NZ	SWE	Certifications	Album
1995	"Snake Caves" / "Baby Lemonade" (as Baby Bird)	—	—	—	—	—	—	—		Non-album single
1996	"Goodnight"	28	—	—	—	—	—	—		Ugly Beautiful
1996	"You're Gorgeous"	3	28	46	74	16	22	17	BPI: Gold	Ugly Beautiful
1997	"Candy Girl"	14	184	—	—	—	—	—		Ugly Beautiful
1997	"Cornershop"	37	125	—	—	—	—	—		Ugly Beautiful
1998	"Bad Old Man"	31	—	—	—	—	—	—		There's Something Going On
1998	"If You'll Be Mine"	28	128	—	—	—	—	—		There's Something Going On
1999	"Back Together"	22	—	—	—	—	—	—		There's Something Going On
1999	Split 1 (split single with East River Pipe) (as Baby Bird)	—	—	—	—	—	—	—		Non-album single
2000	"The F-Word"	35	—	—	—	—	—	—		Bugged
2000	"Out of Sight"	58	—	—	—	—	—	—		Bugged
2000	Double A EP ("Getaway" / "Fireflies")	—	—	—	—	—	—	—		Bugged
2006	"Too Much" / "Dive"	—	—	—	—	—	—	—		Between My Ears There's Nothing But Music
2006	"Lighter 'n' Spoon"	—	—	—	—	—	—	—		Between My Ears There's Nothing But Music
2010	"Unloveable"	—	—	—	—	—	—	—		Ex-Maniac
2019	"King of Nothing"	—	—	—	—	—	—	—		Happy Stupid Nothing
2020	"In Place of Love"	—	—	—	—	—	—	—		Happy Stupid Nothing

=== Compilation tracks ===
- "Bad Twin" (on The Avengers OST, Atlantic Records, August 1998)

=== Promotional videos ===
- "Goodnight" (1996, directed by Stuart A. Gosling)
- "You're Gorgeous" (1997, directed by Stuart A. Gosling)
- "If You'll Be Mine" (1998, directed by David Slade)
- "The F-Word" (2000, directed by Rob Leggatt & Leigh Marling)
- "Out of Sight" (2000, directed by Rob Leggatt & Leigh Marling)
- "Lighter 'n' Spoon" (2008, directed by Philipp Pflüger)
- "Unloveable" (2010, directed by Johnny Depp)
- "King Of Nothing" (2019, directed by [RW/FF])
- "In Place Of Love" (2019, directed by [Stephen Jones])
- "The Greatest Thing" (2019, directed by [Stephen Jones and RW/FF])
- "No Cameras" (2019, directed by [RW/FF])
