= 666 (band) =

German DJ act

- Origin: Germany
- Genres: Trance music
- Years active: 1997-2005
- Past members: Thomas Detert; Mike Griesheimer

666 was a German DJ act formed by Thomas Detert and Mike Griesheimer in 1997. Their brand of trance music often included lyrics in both Spanish and English.

Other occasional members included Alexander Stiepel, Andreas Hötter and René Behrens.

The act disbanded in 2005.

In 2011, however, the band resurfaced, launching several new singles and re-edits of their previous hits.

== Discography ==
=== Albums ===
List of albums, with selected chart positions, sales figures and certifications
Title	Album details	Peak chart positions					Certifications
Title	Album details	DEN	FIN	FRA	NOR	SWE	Certifications
Paradoxx	Released: 1998; Label: House Nation; Formats: LP, CD, cassette	1	17	9	2	4	DEN: Platinum
Nitemare	Released: 1999; Label: House Nation; Formats: CD, cassette	—	—	—	—	—	
Who's Afraid Of...?	Released: 2000; Label: House Nation; Formats: LP, CD, cassette	7	—	27	—	26	

=== Singles ===
Year	Single	Peak chart positions										Certifications (sales thresholds)	Album
Year	Single	GER	AUS	AUT	BEL (Fl)	BEL (Wa)	FRA	NLD	NOR	SWE	UK	Certifications (sales thresholds)	Album
1997	"Alarma!"	56	—	24	—	—	6	45	5	31	58		Paradoxx
1998	"Diablo"	37	62	24	—	—	6	—	10	38	—		Paradoxx
1998	"Amokk"	46	62	20	29	25	8	—	4	16	—		Paradoxx
1998	"Paradoxx"	94	74	32	29	22	29	—	—	26	—	GLF: Gold	Paradoxx
1999	"I'm Your Nitemare"	—	—	—	—	—	—	—	—	36	—		Paradoxx
1999	"Get Up 2 Da Track"	—	—	—	58	—	—	—	—	—	—		Paradoxx
1999	"Bomba!"	—	—	—	—	—	19	—	—	30	—		Nitemare
1999	"The Demon"	—	—	—	—	—	—	—	—	—	—		Nitemare
2000	"D.E.V.I.L."	—	—	—	—	—	35	—	—	19	18		Who's Afraid Of...?
2000	"Dance 2 Disco"	—	—	—	—	—	58	—	—	—	—		Who's Afraid Of...?
2000	"The Millenium Megamix"	—	—	—	—	—	—	—	—	—	—		Who's Afraid Of...?
2001	"Supa-Dupa-Fly"	76	—	51	—	—	36	—	—	48	—		Hellraiser (The Best of)
2002	"Rhythm Takes Control"	—	—	—	—	—	65	—	—	48	—		Insanity
2003	"Insanity"	—	—	—	—	—	—	—	—	—	—		Insanity
2004	"Dance Now!"	—	—	—	—	—	—	—	—	—	—		Insanity
2005	"Policia"	—	—	—	—	—	—	—	—	—	—		Singles only
2017	"Exit the Arena"	—	—	—	—	—	—	—	—	—	—		Singles only
"—" denotes releases that did not chart
