= Fred & Roxy =

Fred & Roxy were a British female vocal duo of Phaedra Aslani and Roxana Aslani, who released the hit single "Something for the Weekend" in May 1999. Recording commenced in 1998 with Trevor Steel and John Holliday, members of The Escape Club, at Air Studios in Hampstead.

The sisters, daughters of the Iranian singer-songwriter Faramarz Aslani, recorded an album worth of material for the Echo label, part of the Chrysalis Group, where both sisters worked from 1995 to 1999. "Something for the Weekend", was the lead single from the intended album and featured remixes from The Almighty and Boy George.

The single entered the UK Singles Chart on 5 February 2000 at No. 36. The second single, like its predecessor, received a dance floor response in July 2000, with mixes from The Almighty. 'Ten Times More' was earmarked for release in August 2000 but was hampered by record company legal issues. The same fate befell Fred and Roxy's untitled debut album which was supposed to be released in September 2000.

Roxana Aslani is now co-founder of No Other Lover with partner Piers Walmisley in the United Kingdom.
