= Jacob Golden =

American singer

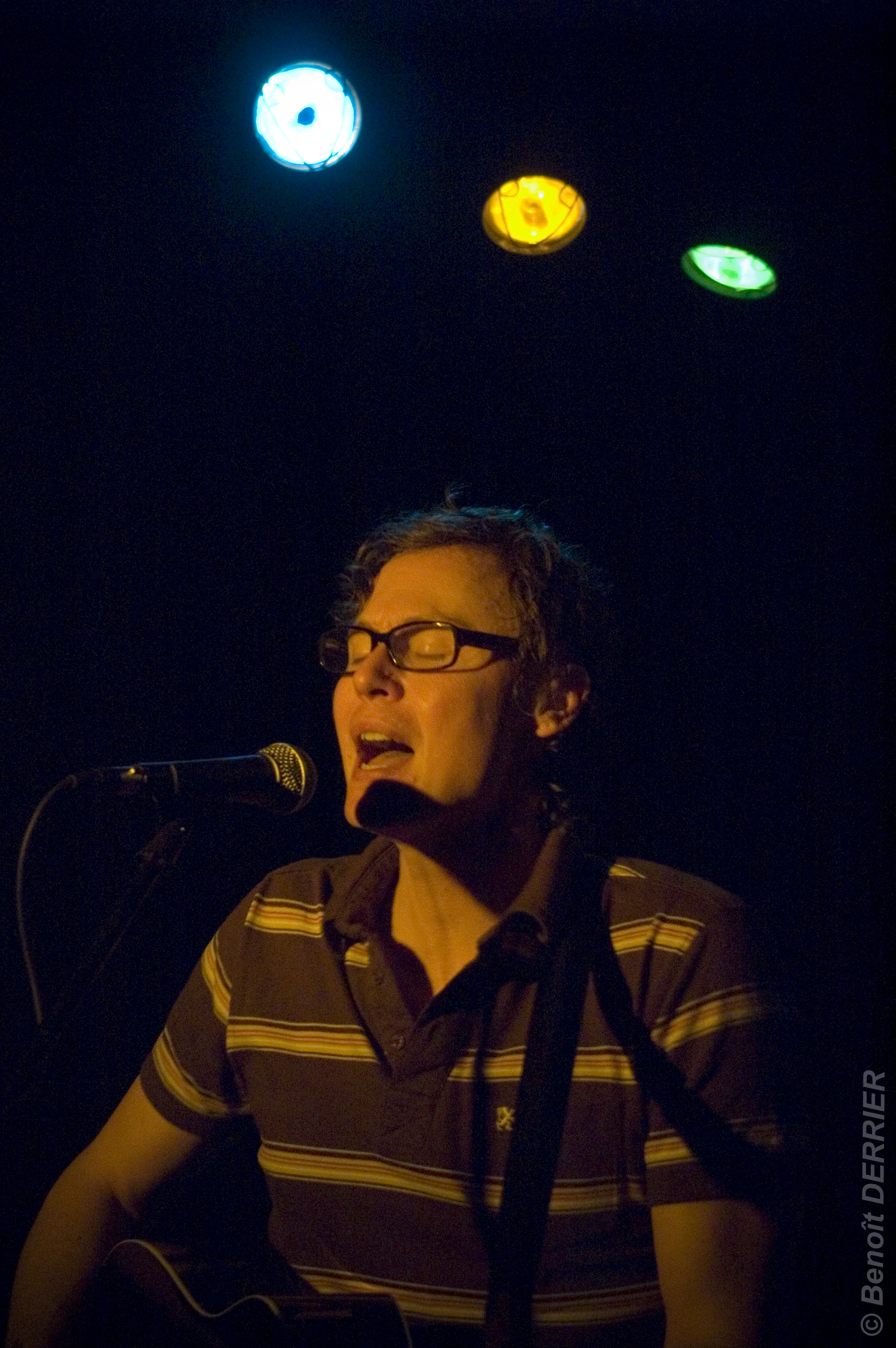
- Jacob Golden performing at The Cellars, Portsmouth, England.

Background information
- Origin: United States
- Genres: Folk, Indie, Acoustic
- Occupation: Singer-songwriter
- Years active: 2001–present
- Website: https://www.jacobgolden.com

Jacob Golden is an American singer-songwriter and guitarist from Portland, Oregon. After the dissolution of his former band, Birthday, in 2000 he has worked as a solo artist and collaborated with different electronica musicians and producers.

== Biography ==
Golden's debut album Hallelujah World was released in 2002 on Rough Trade. Featured on the Faultline album Your Love Means Everything in 2002/2004. His second record Revenge Songs was released on Sawtooth/Echo in 2007.

His song 'On a Saturday' appeared in the series finale of the Fox Drama The O.C..

== Revenge Songs ==
A self-described admirer of the idea of creating "modern field recordings", most of the album was recorded in Golden's home in Portland, and all background noise has been left in the finished record. On 'Zero Integrity' an ambulance siren can be heard in the background. Other tracks were recorded in underground car parks, concrete art galleries and at The Magic Closet in Portland.

Hand made limited edition copies of 'Revenge Songs' were made.

== Discography ==
=== Studio albums ===
- Hallelujah World 17 June 2002 (Rough Trade) UK
- Revenge Songs 2007 (Sawtooth Records/Echo) UK

=== EPs and singles ===
- "Welcome to Life" EP (Birthday) 2000 (Rough Trade) UK
- "Jacob Golden EP" 16 July 2001 (Rough Trade) UK
- "Come on Over" 28 October 2002 UK

=== Compilations ===
- On a Saturday (soundtrack, The O.C., 2007)

=== Collaborations ===
- Birthday – Welcome to Life EP (2000)
- Faultline – Your Love Means Everything (album, 2002)

(Bitter Kiss (vocals, guitars, keyboards, percussions), Where Is My Boy (guitar with Chris Martin of Coldplay on vocals) and Green Fields (backing vocals with Michael Stipe of R.E.M. on front vocals)

- Nitin Sawhney – Human (album, 2003)

(Vocals on Say Hello and Falling Angels)

- Faultline – Your Love Means Everything (re-release without track Bitter Kiss, 2004)
- Nitin Sawhney – Philtre (album, 2005) vocals on Everything
- Little Foxes – Little Foxes EP. (2006)
