= The Original Lo-Fi =

Box set by Baby Bird
- Released: 18 November 2002
- Recorded: 1988–1996
- Genre: Lo-fi/Indie
- Length: 345:45
- Label: Sanctuary
- Producer: Stephen Jones

Baby Bird chronology
The Greatest Hits (1997)	The Original Lo-Fi (2002)

The Original Lo-Fi is a CD box set compiling five albums of home-made recordings released by Stephen Jones under the name Baby Bird between 1995 and 1997, plus a sixth CD (entitled The Black Album), consisting of additional material recorded during the 1990s.

== Critical reception ==
Professional ratings
Review scores
Source	Rating
Allmusic	4/5 stars

"The five albums in question form a song-cycle tracking the life-cycle from birth to death. The sheer wealth and diversity of music crammed into this tiny box makes it an absolute bargain." – The Independent

"The Original Lo-Fi should cement Baby Bird's reputation as one of the finest experimental pop artists of his time...Written, performed, and produced as only Stephen Jones is capable of, the songs compiled on The Original Lo-Fi are easily among the finest musical confections of a generation." – Allmusic

== Track listing ==
All tracks written and composed by Stephen Jones.

=== Disc one (I Was Born a Man) ===
1. "Blow It to the Moon"
2. "Mans Tight Vest"
3. "Lemonade Baby"
4. "C.F.C."
5. "Cornershop"
6. "Kiss Your Country"
7. "Hong Kong Blues"
8. "Dead Bird Sings"
9. "Baby Bird"
10. "Farmer"
11. "Invisible Tune"
12. "Alison"
13. "Love Love Love"

=== Disc two (Bad Shave) ===
1. "KW Jesus TV Roof Appeal"
2. "Bad Jazz"
3. "Too Handsome to Be Homeless"
4. "Steam Train"
5. "Bad Shave"
6. "Oh My God You're a King"
7. "The Restaurant Is Guilty"
8. "Valerie"
9. "Shop Girl"
10. "W.B.T."
11. "Hate Song"
12. "45 & Fat"
13. "Sha Na Na"
14. "Bug in a Breeze"
15. "It's Okay"
16. "Happy Bus"
17. "Swinging from Tree to Tree"
18. "Past Lasts Longer"
19. "Why?"

=== Disc three (Fatherhood) ===
1. "No Children"
2. "Cooling Towers"
3. "Cool & Crazy Things to Do"
4. "Bad Blood"
5. "Neil Armstrong"
6. "I Was Never Here"
7. "Saturday"
8. "Good Night"
9. "I Didn't Want to Wake You Up"
10. "Iceberg"
11. "Aluminium Beach"
12. "Goddamn It, You're a Kid"
13. "Daisies"
14. "Failed Old Singer"
15. "Fatherhood"
16. "Dustbin Liner"
17. "Not About a Girl"
18. "Good Weather"
19. "But Love"
20. "May We"

=== Disc four (The Happiest Man Alive) ===
1. "Razorblade Shower"
2. "Sundial in a Tunnel"
3. "Little White Man"
4. "Halfway Up the Hill"
5. "Horsesugar"
6. "Please Don't Be Famous"
7. "Louise"
8. "Copper Feel"
9. "Seagullably"
10. "Dead in Love"
11. "Candy Girl"
12. "Gunfingers"
13. "Married"
14. "In the Country"
15. "Planecrash Xmas"
16. "This Beautiful Disease"
17. "You'll Get a Slap"
18. "In the Morning"

=== Disc five (Dying Happy) ===
1. "Losing My Hair"
2. "Tomorrow's Gone"
3. "Petrol Cigarette"
4. "When Everyone Speaks English, the World Will Explode"
5. "Homesick Satellites"
6. "TV"
7. "The Unemployable Rub Oil on Her Coffin"
8. "Grandma Begs to Be 18 Again"
9. "It's Alright Dad, Isn't It"
10. "Lead Cloud"
11. "Cheap Astronaut"
12. "Metal Waterpistol"

=== Disc six (The Black Album) ===
1. "Black Intro"
2. "Stick It in Me"
3. "Coming Alive"
4. "Unswayed"
5. "Hum"
6. "Get in the Light"
7. "When the Lights Go Out"
8. "Sun Is Shining"
9. "Cheap Gold"
10. "Pretty Little Sparks"
11. "Devil Music"
12. "Someone Left the Gas On"
13. "Always Here"
14. "Can't Breath the Same Air"
15. "Drunk Car"
16. "The End of Life"
