= The Echo Label =

British record label

- Parent company: BMG Rights Management
- Founded: 1994
- Founder: Chrysalis Group and Pony Canyon
- Status: Acquired by BMG as part of the Chrysalis publisher
- Distributor(s): Universal Music Group
- Genre: Indie rock
- Country of origin: United Kingdom
- Location: London, England

The Echo Label was a British record label started by Chrysalis Group in 1994, and linked with Pony Canyon in Japan. The Chrysalis Group were the original owners of Chrysalis Records, which they sold to EMI.

In 2005, The Echo Label recorded a loss of over £2.0 million. The decision was taken to restructure the business at the beginning of the 2006 financial year, into an "incubator" for developing writer-artists with the intention of "upstreaming" them to a major label. The signings which resulted from this included Bat for Lashes, Steven Lindsay, Rosalie Deighton, Jacob Golden and Sarabeth Tucek. They would continue to release records for their established artists Feeder and Morcheeba. However, in a Chrysalis Group report dated 15 August 2008, it was stated that The Echo Label had performed below management's expectations and had not upstreamed any artists in this period, other than Bat For Lashes, who were transferred to Parlophone in early 2007.

In May 2013, Sony Music Entertainment purchased the distribution rights to Echo material and was re-issued in July under the label. In March 2017, Sony's distribution rights expired, and BMG Rights Management (which acquired the Chrysalis Music publisher in 2010) transferred the distribution to Warner Music Group's Alternative Distribution Alliance division. Since 2023, BMG (including The Echo Label) is distributed by Universal Music Group.

The Echo imprint now exclusively sits within BMG, which also administers much of the publishing through the Chrysalis catalogue. Similar to its sister label, Sanctuary Records, Echo continues to exploit a number of artist catalogues, including Feeder, Bat for Lashes, and several artist catalogues acquired from Warner Music (including Supergrass, The Subways, Sigue Sigue Sputnik, White Town, Devildriver, Thomas Dolby and Megadeth).

Echo only exist on Companies House as a legal entity to maintain the copyrights on their releases.

== Former artists ==
- 666
- Marc Almond
- Ash (acquired in 2017)
- Babybird
- Bat For Lashes (still signed to Echo/Parlophone)
- Big Yoga Muffin
- Black Rebel Motorcycle Club
- Julian Cope
- Dark Flower
- Deichkind (acquired in 2017)
- Rosalie Deighton
- Denim
- Devildriver (acquired in 2017)
- D'Influence
- Thomas Dolby (acquired in 2017)
- Anne Dudley
- Engineers
- Feeder
- Fred & Roxy
- Jacob Golden
- I Am Kloot
- Ray Lamontagne
- LHOOQ
- Steven Lindsay
- George Martin
- Megadeth (acquired in 2017)
- Moloko
- Mono
- Morcheeba
- Mr. Phillips
- Róisín Murphy
- Nio
- Nitzer Ebb
- Nyack
- .O.rang
- Pranksters
- The Psychedelic Waltons
- Sigue Sigue Sputnik (acquired in 2017)
- Jean Jacques Smoothie
- Spek
- Subcircus
- TBC
- The Stands
- The Subways (acquired in 2017)
- Supergrass (acquired in 2017)
- Fuzz Townshend
- Sarabeth Tucek
- Utah Saints
- The Vacation
- Zu
- Nerina Pallot
- White Town (acquired in 2017)

== See also ==
- The Echo Label catalogue
- Chrysalis Records
- Lists of record labels
