= Blood Like Lemonade =

Studio album by Morcheeba
- Released: 7 June 2010
- Genre: Trip hop, electronica, soul
- Length: 43:04
- Label: PIAS
- Producer: Paul Godfrey, Ross Godfrey (musician)

Morcheeba chronology
Dive Deep (2008)	Blood Like Lemonade (2010)	Head Up High (2013)

Singles from Blood Like Lemonade
- 1. "Even Though" Released: 24 May 2010; 2. "Blood Like Lemonade" Released: 11 October 2010

Professional ratings
Review scores
Source	Rating
AllMusic	4/5 stars
The Independent	4/5 stars
musicOMH	3/5 stars
Virgin Music	7/10 stars

Blood Like Lemonade is the seventh studio album by the British band Morcheeba, released on 7 June 2010 in the United Kingdom. The album marks the return of former lead singer Skye Edwards, who left the band in 2003. The first single released was "Even Though". Paul Godfrey said, "This is the record we should have made after Big Calm [Morcheeba's second album, released in 1998] but we had to travel treacherous terrains to get back to our natural habitat."

The group embarked on a tour of the United Kingdom, Europe and the US to promote the album in autumn 2010.

== Track listing ==
No.	Title	Writer(s)	Length
1.	"Crimson"	P. Godfrey; R. Godfrey; S. Edwards	5:10
2.	"Even Though"	P. Godfrey; R. Godfrey; S. Edwards	4:18
3.	"Blood Like Lemonade"	P. Godfrey; R. Godfrey; S. Edwards	4:51
4.	"Mandala"	P. Godfrey; R. Godfrey	2:39
5.	"I Am the Spring"	P. Godfrey; R. Godfrey; S. Edwards	3:26
6.	"Recipe for Disaster"	P. Godfrey; R. Godfrey; S. Edwards	5:19
7.	"Easier Said Than Done"	P. Godfrey; R. Godfrey; S. Edwards	3:41
8.	"Cut to the Bass"	P. Godfrey; R. Godfrey	4:18
9.	"Self Made Man"	P. Godfrey; R. Godfrey; S. Edwards	5:09
10.	"Beat of the Drum"	P. Godfrey; R. Godfrey; S. Edwards; B.Burgess	6:09
Total length:			45:03

iTunes Bonus track; Russian edition hidden track
No.	Title	Length
11.	"Straight Ahead"	3:26
Total length:		48:40

== Charts ==
=== Weekly charts ===
Weekly chart performance for Blood Like Lemonade
Chart (2010)	Peak position
Austrian Albums (Ö3 Austria)	30
Belgian Albums (Ultratop Flanders)	96
Belgian Albums (Ultratop Wallonia)	40
French Albums (SNEP)	13
German Albums (Offizielle Top 100)	26
Italian Albums (FIMI)	75
Russian Albums (2M)	5
Swiss Albums (Schweizer Hitparade)	3

=== Year-end charts ===
Year-end chart performance for Blood Like Lemonade
Chart (2010)	Position
French Albums (SNEP)	168
Russian Albums (2M)	44
Swiss Albums (Schweizer Hitparade)	76

== Certifications ==
Sales certifications for Blood Like Lemonade
Region	Certification	Certified units/sales
Russia (NFPF)	Gold	5,000^{*}
^{*} Sales figures based on certification alone.

In 2010 it was awarded a silver certification from the Independent Music Companies Association, which indicated sales of at least 30,000 copies throughout Europe. In 2011 it was upgraded to gold certification for 75,000 copies sold in Europe.
