= Parts of the Process =

Greatest hits album by Morcheeba
- Released: 30 June 2003
- Genre: Trip hop; electronica
- Length: 78:20
- Label: China; Reprise

Morcheeba chronology
Charango (2002)	Parts of the Process (2003)	The Antidote (2005)

Professional ratings
Review scores
Source	Rating
AllMusic	4/5 stars
Slant Magazine	3.5/5 stars
The Village Voice	(dud)

Parts of the Process is a greatest hits album by English electronic music group Morcheeba released in 2003 by China Records in the UK, and Reprise Records in North America. The album reached number 6 on the UK Albums Chart.

The album includes all of the single releases by the band, with the exception of "Shoulder Holster". It also contains the non-single tracks "Over and Over" (from the 1998 album Big Calm) and "What New York Couples Fight About" (from the 2002 album Charango), as well as the previously unreleased songs "What's Your Name" and "Can't Stand It".

"What's Your Name", which features a rap verse by Big Daddy Kane, was released as a single to accompany the album, supported by a video.

Tracks on the album were remastered to make them sound louder than their originals.

Around the time of the release, Morcheeba also released the DVD Morcheeba: From Brixton to Beijing, which contained performances of a large catalogue of Morcheeba's songs.

== Track listing ==
Parts of the Process track listing
No.	Title	Writer(s)	Length
1.	"The Sea"	P. Godfrey; R. Godfrey; S. Edwards	5:47
2.	"Tape Loop"	P. Godfrey; R. Godfrey; S. Edwards	3:48
3.	"Otherwise"	P. Godfrey; R. Godfrey; S. Edwards	3:42
4.	"Blindfold"	P. Godfrey; R. Godfrey; S. Edwards	4:37
5.	"Be Yourself"	P. Godfrey; R. Godfrey; S. Edwards	3:13
6.	"Part of the Process"	P. Godfrey; R. Godfrey; S. Edwards	4:24
7.	"Let Me See"	P. Godfrey; R. Godfrey; S. Edwards	4:20
8.	"Undress Me Now"	P. Godfrey; R. Godfrey; S. Edwards; K. Wagner	3:31
9.	"What's Your Name" (featuring Big Daddy Kane)	P. Godfrey; R. Godfrey; S. Edwards; R. Davis	4:00
10.	"Trigger Hippie"	P. Godfrey; R. Godfrey; S. Edwards	5:31
11.	"Rome Wasn't Built in a Day"	P. Godfrey; R. Godfrey; S. Edwards	3:34
12.	"Over and Over"	P. Godfrey; R. Godfrey; S. Edwards	2:20
13.	"What New York Couples Fight About" (featuring Kurt Wagner)	P. Godfrey; R. Godfrey; S. Edwards; K. Wagner	6:16
14.	"World Looking In"	P. Godfrey; R. Godfrey; S. Edwards	4:06
15.	"Moog Island"	P. Godfrey; R. Godfrey; S. Edwards	5:21
16.	"Way Beyond"	P. Godfrey; R. Godfrey; S. Edwards	3:35
17.	"Never an Easy Way"	P. Godfrey; R. Godfrey; S. Edwards	6:41
18.	"Can't Stand It"	P. Godfrey; R. Godfrey; S. Edwards; R. Davis	3:20
Total length:			78:20

== Charts ==
Chart performance for Parts of the Process
Chart (2003)	Peak position
Australian Albums (ARIA)	85
Austrian Albums (Ö3 Austria)	37
Belgian Albums (Ultratop Wallonia)	16
French Albums (SNEP)	169
German Albums (Offizielle Top 100)	67
Irish Albums (IRMA)	41
Italian Albums (FIMI)	9
New Zealand Albums (RMNZ)	49
Portuguese Albums (AFP)	9
Scottish Albums (OCC)	22
Swiss Albums (Schweizer Hitparade)	6
UK Albums (OCC)	6

== Certifications ==
Certifications for Parts of the Process
Region	Certification	Certified units/sales
United Kingdom (BPI)	Platinum	300,000^{‡}
^{‡} Sales+streaming figures based on certification alone.
