= Dive Deep =

Studio album by Morcheeba
- Released: 4 February 2008
- Recorded: 2007
- Genres: Trip hop, downtempo, adult contemporary music
- Length: 40:27
- Labels: Echo, Ultra
- Producer: Paul Godfrey

Morcheeba chronology
The Antidote (2005)	Dive Deep (2008)	Blood Like Lemonade (2010)

Singles from Dive Deep
- 1. "Enjoy the Ride" Released: 28 January 2008; 2. "Gained the World" Released: 26 May 2008

Dive Deep is the sixth studio album by the British band Morcheeba, released on 4 February 2008 in the United Kingdom. It is also the second studio album recorded without the former lead singer Skye Edwards. It has a number of vocalists, and several songs can be heard on the band's MySpace page. The first single released was "Enjoy the Ride" which features Judie Tzuke. The second single, "Gained the World", featuring Manda Zamolo, was released on 28 April 2008.

The group embarked on a North American tour to promote the album on 24 March that started in Washington DC and ended on 13 April 2008 in Los Angeles.

== Production ==
Ross Godfrey discussed the making of album in an interview:

We used an incredible amount of new technology for this album, but it's all new-old stuff – ancient keyboards, like claviolines. It's all very organic. The technology came into play in the way that we edited it and put it together.

Morcheeba is dedicated to the preservation of the marine environment and is using the release of Dive Deep as an opportunity to raise awareness.

== Critical reception ==
Professional ratings
Aggregate scores
Source	Rating
Metacritic	63/100
Review scores
Source	Rating
AllMusic	4/5 stars
BBC Music	(positive)
Billboard	(positive)
Daily Express	3/5 stars
The Independent	5/5 stars
Okayplayer	3/5 stars
PopMatters	5/10 stars
The Times	3/5 stars
Virgin Media	2/5 stars
Q	3/5 stars

Professional reviews were mainly favorable and positive to mixed. At Metacritic, which assigns a normalized rating out of 100 to reviews from mainstream critics, the album has an average score of 63, based on 10 reviews, indicating "positive". Billboard described the album as a "gorgeous collection of folk- and blues-inflected electro-pop ballads". The Independent gave the album five stars, describing it as "A stirring return to form."

== Guests ==
Dive Deep includes many guest vocalists, such as the acclaimed singer-songwriter Judie Tzuke and relative newcomers Thomas Dybdahl from Norway, the rapper Cool Calm Pete and Manda Zamolo, a French singer. Reviewing the album, BBC Music noted that guests "appear chosen less for who they are than what they can bring, sweet and soulful voices that supply an emotional backbone to the Godfreys' languid, slo-mo funk grooves."

== Track listing ==
=== US Release ===
No.	Title	Writer(s)	Vocals	Length
1.	"Enjoy the Ride"	P. Godfrey, R. Godfrey, Tzuke	Judie Tzuke	4:04
2.	"Riverbed"	P. Godfrey, R. Godfrey, Dybdahl	Thomas Dybdahl	5:24
3.	"Thumbnails"	P. Godfrey, R. Godfrey	instrumental	2:35
4.	"Run Honey Run"	John Martyn	Bradley Burgess	3:44
5.	"Gained the World"	P. Godfrey, R. Godfrey	Manda Zamolo	2:56
6.	"One Love Karma"	P. Godfrey, R. Godfrey, Goldman, Pete Chung	Cool Calm Pete	3:32
7.	"Au-delà"	P. Godfrey, R. Godfrey, Zamolo	Manda Zamolo	2:15
8.	"Blue Chair"	P. Godfrey, R. Godfrey, Goldman, Tzuke	Judie Tzuke	4:07
9.	"Sleep on It"	P. Godfrey, R. Godfrey, Dybdahl	Thomas Dybdahl	5:34
10.	"The Ledge Beyond the Edge"	P. Godfrey, R. Godfrey		2:03
11.	"Washed Away"	P. Godfrey, R. Godfrey, Dybdahl	Thomas Dybdahl	4:23

=== Alternative Promo Release ===
Disc I – Dive Deep

No.	Title	Writer(s)	Vocals	Length
1.	"Enjoy the Ride"	P. Godfrey, R. Godfrey, Tzuke	Judie Tzuke	4:04
2.	"Riverbed"	P. Godfrey, R. Godfrey, Dybdahl	Thomas Dybdahl	5:24
3.	"Thumbnails"	P. Godfrey, R. Godfrey	instrumental	2:35
4.	"Run Honey Run"	John Martyn	Bradley Burgess	3:44
5.	"Gained the World"	P. Godfrey, R. Godfrey	Manda Zamolo	2:56
6.	"One Love Karma"	P. Godfrey, R. Godfrey, Goldman, Pete Chung	Cool Calm Pete	3:32
7.	"Au-delà"	P. Godfrey, R. Godfrey, Zamolo	Manda Zamolo	2:15
8.	"Blue Chair"	P. Godfrey, R. Godfrey, Goldman, Tzuke	Judie Tzuke	4:07
9.	"Sleep on It"	P. Godfrey, R. Godfrey, Dybdahl	Thomas Dybdahl	5:34
10.	"Hemphasis"	P. Godfrey, R. Godfrey		2:05
11.	"Flowers"	P. Godfrey, R. Godfrey	Manda Zamolo	4:06
12.	"Washed Away"	P. Godfrey, R. Godfrey, Dybdahl	Thomas Dybdahl	4:23
13.	"The Ledge Beyond the Edge"	P. Godfrey, R. Godfrey		5:27

Disc II – Instrumental Versions

No.	Title	Length
1.	"Enjoy the Ride (Instrumental Version)"	4:11
2.	"Riverbed (Instrumental Version)"	5:44
3.	"Thumbnails (Instrumental Version)"	2:35
4.	"Run Honey Run (Instrumental Version)"	3:44
5.	"Gained the World (Instrumental Version)"	3:04
6.	"One Love Karma (Instrumental Version)"	3:31
7.	"Au-delà (Instrumental Version)"	2:17
8.	"Blue Chair (Instrumental Version)"	4:28
9.	"Sleep on It (Instrumental Version)"	6:36
10.	"Hemphasis (Instrumental Version)"	2:08
11.	"Flowers (Instrumental Version)"	4:10
12.	"Washed Away (Instrumental Version)"	4:23
13.	"The Ledge Beyond the Edge (Instrumental Version)"	6:21

== Charts ==
Dive Deep entered the UK Albums Chart in the second week of February at position 59, the band's lowest charting album in the United Kingdom. It was more successful on the Swiss Album Charts which it entered at number 8 a week later. On 9 February, Dive Deep entered the French Albums Chart at number 15. Since its release on iTunes, the album has had a big success throughout Europe, with many entries under Top 10.

Chart (2008)	Peak position
Australian Albums Chart (ARIA)	149
Austrian Album Chart	42
Dutch Album Chart	82
French Album Chart	15
German Album Chart	39
Italian Album Chart	50
Swiss Album Chart	8
UK Albums Chart	59

It was awarded a gold certification from the Independent Music Companies Association which indicated sales of at least 100,000 copies throughout Europe.

== Certifications ==
Region	Certification	Certified units/sales
France (SNEP)	Silver	44,230

== Personnel ==
- Ross Godfrey (acoustic guitar, electric guitar, lap steel guitar, banjo, piano, Fender Rhodes, clavinet, Hammond B-3 organ, Wurlitzer organ, synthesizer, bass guitar)
- Paul Godfrey (drums, drum machine, sound effects, scratches)
- Thomas Dybdahl (vocals, acoustic guitar, piano, bass guitar)
- Bradley Burgess (vocals, guitars, bass guitar)
- Judie Tzuke, Cool Calm Pete (vocals)
- The Mak of All Trades (flute)
- Dan Goldman (Fender Rhodes piano, synthesizer, bass guitar)
- Martin Carling (drums)
- Amanda Zamolo (vocals, background vocals)

== Release history ==
Region	Date	Label	Catalog
France	3 February 2008	PIAS France	
United Kingdom	4 February 2008	Echo	ECHCD77
United States	19 February 2008	Ultra	
Canada	4 March 2008	Ultra	

== Enjoy the Ride ==
"Enjoy the Ride"

Single by Morcheeba

from the album Dive Deep
- Released: (United Kingdom) 28 January 2008 (digital) (United States) 24 March 2008 (EP)
- Recorded: 2007
- Genre: Electronic, trip hop
- Length: 4:02
- Label: Echo, Ultra
- Songwriters: Judie Tzuke, Ross Godfrey
- Producer: Paul Godfrey

Morcheeba singles chronology
"Everybody Loves a Loser" (2005)	"Enjoy the Ride" (2008)	"Gained the World" (2008)

Music video
- "Enjoy the Ride" on YouTube

"Enjoy the Ride" is the first single from the album. It was produced by Paul Godfrey and features vocals from Judie Tzuke who also co-wrote the song. Godfrey said, "It's a beautiful song, one of our very best, and it's about accepting who you are in the moment and not trying to distract yourself with everything else – gaining a new understanding of yourself and life." When reviewing track-by-track for Ultra records, Paul Godfrey described the song: "This song came about after a long conversation about Los Angeles. Both Ross and Judie (Tzuke) had just come back from there and when the chat ended we wrote it in about 20 minutes. It was perfect, one of our very best and the lead single. It sounds like Fleetwood Mac in their prime."

=== Critical reception ===
Professional reviews were mainly positive. The BBC website gave a positive review for the song, saying it is "...a melancholy, slightly bluesy Tzuke-sung number accompanied by weaving guitar and haunting strings". The Daily Mirror rated the song four stars out of five. "It's a brooding brew that captures the mood of dark LA paranoia conjured up by The Eagles and Fleetwood Mac, putting it in a 21st century context". AllMusic described "Enjoy the Ride", along with the "Blue Chair" as "the mellow highlight to curl up with."

A screenshot from the music video

ZME Music claimed the song as "...a beautiful, soothing synth pop ballad, in which Judie Tzuke's R&B vocals resemble those of Beth Ross, to a extended; it feels however as the track is over-produced and over-polished." However, Orange UK gave a negative review and rated "Enjoy the Ride" only one star out of five saying "It is no sort of ride at all, all tasteful styling and a rhythm so mid-paced you barely notice it's moving."

=== Music video ===
The music video for "Enjoy the Ride" was produced by the cartoon animator Joel Trussell and is an animated tale of bringing the dead back to life.

=== Track listing ===
The single was released on 28 January 2008 in the United Kingdom.

1. "Enjoy the Ride" – 4:05
2. "Enjoy the Ride (Weekend Return No Frills Mix)" – 6:24
3. "Enjoy the Ride (One Way Acapella Mix)" – 2:36
