= Fragments of Freedom =

Studio album by Morcheeba
- Released: 7 August 2000
- Genres: Electronic; trip hop; R&B; alternative rock
- Length: 44:26
- Labels: Sire; Reprise; Warner Bros.
- Producers: Paul Godfrey; Ross Godfrey; Pete Norris

Morcheeba chronology
Big Calm (1998)	Fragments of Freedom (2000)	Charango (2002)

Singles from Fragments of Freedom
- 1. "Rome Wasn't Built in a Day" Released: 5 July 2000; 2. "Be Yourself" Released: 2000; 3. "World Looking In" Released: 2001

Fragments of Freedom is the third studio album by English electronic music group Morcheeba, which was released in 2000. It was one of their most successful albums in terms of chart sales. Special versions of the CD contained a short CD-ROM video of the 'Making of Fragments of Freedom' and also music videos.

== Reception ==
Professional ratings
Review scores
Source	Rating
AllMusic	2/5 stars
NME	7/10
Pitchfork	5.1/10
Rolling Stone	3.5/5 stars
Spin	4/10
The Village Voice	(dud)

NME declared Fragments to be "an enduring monument to quiet goodness", while The A.V. Club considered it to have "fine and adventurous" songs that "are more than worthy of the band's legacy", but noted that the wide variety of styles between individual tracks means that it "never quite builds up artistic momentum."

Pitchfork, however, criticised the album's contents as "no less flat, smooth, or mass-produced than its jewel case", stating that there was "skill and craft" but no "personality or creativity", and that the backup singers make it more difficult to enjoy Skye Edwards' voice; similarly, Robert Christgau rated the album a "dud" It was ahead of the Nu Disco curve and 80's revival so was under appreciated in Paul's eye's.

== Track listing ==
All tracks are written by Paul Godfrey, Ross Godfrey and Skye Edwards, except where noted.

No.	Title	Writer(s)	Length
1.	"World Looking In"		4:06
2.	"Rome Wasn't Built in a Day"		3:34
3.	"Love Is Rare"		4:03
4.	"Let It Go"		4:43
5.	"A Well Deserved Break"		2:12
6.	"Love Sweet Love" (featuring Mr. Complex)		3:57
7.	"In the Hands of the Gods" (featuring Biz Markie)		1:40
8.	"Shallow End"		3:51
9.	"Be Yourself"		3:13
10.	"Coming Down Gently"		4:18
11.	"Good Girl Down" (featuring Bahamadia)	Paul Godfrey; Ross Godfrey; Skye Edwards; Antonia Reed	3:26
12.	"Fragments of Freedom"		5:06
Total length:			44:30

Japanese edition bonus track
No.	Title	Length
13.	"Frogmarched to Freedom"	5:01
Total length:		49:33

Best Buy edition bonus disc
No.	Title	Writer(s)	Length
1.	"In the Hands of the Gods" (Tumbleweed Gunslinger Mix)		4:15
2.	"Frogmarched to Freedom"		4:56
3.	"Crystal Blue Persuasion" (Cheeba Blue Persuasion Mix)	Tommy James; Mike Val; Ed Gray	3:35
Total length:			12:45

== Charts ==
=== Weekly charts ===
Chart (2000)	Peak position
Australian Albums (ARIA)	11
Austrian Albums (Ö3 Austria)	13
Belgian Albums (Ultratop Flanders)	47
Belgian Albums (Ultratop Wallonia)	42
Canada Top Albums/CDs (RPM)	9
French Albums (SNEP)	10
German Albums (Offizielle Top 100)	19
Hungarian Albums (MAHASZ)	24
Irish Albums (IRMA)	16
Italian Albums (FIMI)	3
New Zealand Albums (RMNZ)	15
Norwegian Albums (VG-lista)	7
Scottish Albums (Official Charts)	5
Swedish Albums (Sverigetopplistan)	53
Swiss Albums (Schweizer Hitparade)	7
UK Albums (Official Charts)	6
US Billboard 200	113

=== Year-end charts ===
Chart (2000)	Position
Swiss Albums (Schweizer Hitparade)	66
UK Albums (OCC)	96

== Certifications and sales ==
Region	Certification	Certified units/sales
Australia (ARIA)	Gold	35,000^{^}
France (SNEP)	Gold	100,000^{*}
Italy (FIMI)	Gold	50,000^{*}
Spain (Promusicae)	Gold	50,000^{^}
Switzerland (IFPI Switzerland)	Gold	25,000^{^}
United Kingdom (BPI)	Gold	100,000^{^}
United States	—	150,000
Summaries
Worldwide	—	1,000,000
^{*} Sales figures based on certification alone.^{^} Shipments figures based on certification alone.
