= Escape the Chaos =

Studio album by Morcheeba
- Released: 23 May 2025
- Studio: The Sewing Room (Surrey); Hillside (London); Silver Shark (Tooting); Black Gate (Dublin); Stable (Dunbar); New Realm (London)
- Length: 47:58
- Label: 100%
- Producer: Ross Godfrey

Morcheeba chronology
Blackest Blue (2021)	Escape the Chaos (2025)

Singles from Escape the Chaos
- 1. "Call for Love" Released: 21 January 2025; 2. "We Live and Die" Released: 25 February 2025; 3. "Peace of Me" Released: 8 April 2025

Escape the Chaos is the eleventh studio album by British electronic band Morcheeba. It was released on 23 May 2025 under 100% Records. It was preceded by three singles: "Call for Love", "We Live and Die", and "Peace of Me", which features rapper Oscar Worldpeace.

== Background ==
Band member, singer and songwriter Skye Edwards revealed in a June 2023 interview that the band had begun working on their eleventh album with ten tracks in the demo phase. Ross Godfrey stated, "This whole record is a process of trying to reconnect with what really matters [...] whether it's what in your heart or with the world, putting your feet on grass and feeling the earth beneath you".

== Promotion ==
=== Singles ===
- In January 2025, the band released the single "Call for Love" A visualiser, created by Dean Eastman and Caroline Darche, was released on the same day.
- "We Live and Die" was released as the album's second single on 28 February 2025.
- "Peace of Me", a collaboration with Oscar #Worldpeace was released on 8 April 2025 as the third single An official music video, created by Eastman and Darche, was released on the same day.

=== Live performances ===
Morcheeba performed at the Concorde 2 in Brighton on 22 May 2025.

== Track listing ==
Escape the Chaos track listing
No.	Title	Writer(s)	Length
1.	"Call for Love"	Ross Godfrey; Skye Edwards	4:22
2.	"Elephant Clouds"	Godfrey; Edwards; Alex O'Keeffe	4:14
3.	"Peace of Me" (featuring Oscar Worldpeace)	Godfrey; Edwards; Oscar Nyanin	2:44
4.	"We Live and Die"	Godfrey; Edwards	3:14
5.	"Far We Come"	Godfrey; Edwards	4:44
6.	"Molten"	Godfrey; Edwards	4:41
7.	"Bleeding Out"	Godfrey; Edwards; O'Keeffe	5:43
8.	"Cooler Heads"	Godfrey; Hush Counsell	2:11
9.	"Hold It Down"	Godfrey; Edwards; Jordan T. Hadfield; Steve Gordon	3:10
10.	"Dead to Me"	Godfrey; Edwards	4:10
11.	"Pareidolia" (featuring Amanda Zamolo)	Godfrey; Amanda Zamolo	3:44
12.	"Escape the Chaos"	Godfrey; Edwards	4:56
Total length:			47:58

== Personnel ==
Credits adapted from the album's liner notes.

=== Morcheeba ===
- Skye – vocals (tracks 1–7, 9, 10, 12); whistle, cello (5)
- Ross Godfrey – production (all tracks), guitar (1–4, 7–11), Jupiter synthesisers (1–3, 6, 10, 12), Wurlitzer piano (1, 2, 5, 10, 11), ambience (tracks 1, 4–7, 12), bass (1, 4, 5, 8, 10); clavinet, Hammond organ (1); EMS synthesisers (2), drum programming (3–6, 10, 11), sample programming (3–6, 11), Mellotron (5–7, 10, 12), acoustic guitars (5, 6), slide guitars (5, 12), Moog synthesisers (6, 8, 9), electric guitars (6), piano (7), Fender VI (8, 11), charango (8); Solina String Ensemble, Landscape Stereo Field (12)

=== Additional musicians ===
- Henry Law – drum programming (tracks 1, 11, 12), ambience (11)
- Alex O'Keeffe – drum programming, sample programming (tracks 2, 7); Super 6 synthesisers (7); string arrangements, brass arrangements (4, 6)
- Jaega McKenna-Gordon – drums (tracks 2, 9), drum fills (4), backing vocals (9)
- Steve Gordon – bass (tracks 2, 6, 9), backing vocals (9)
- Oscar Worldpeace – vocals (track 3)
- Juanito – tambor alegre (track 3)
- Alex Cornish – viola, violins (tracks 4, 6)
- Idris Rahman – tenor saxophone, baritone saxophone (tracks 4, 6)
- Robin Hopcraft – trumpet (tracks 4, 6), trombone (4) flugelhorn (6)
- Ghilli Gordon – Fender Rhodes piano (track 4)
- Hush Counsell – drum programming, sample programming (track 8)
- Jordan T. Hadfield – piano, backing vocals (track 9)
- Edmund Adonis – congas, percussion (track 9)
- Nina – backing vocals (track 9)
- Amy – backing vocals (track 9)
- Arla-Rose – backing vocals (track 9)
- Tagaranyika Mhizha – backing vocals (track 9)
- Margo Raats – backing vocals (track 9)
- Amanda Zamolo – vocals (track 11)
- El Leon Pardo – gaita (track 11)
- Mr. Six – decks (track 11)

=== Technical ===
- Alex O'Keeffe – co-production (tracks 2, 7)
- Darren Heelis – mixing
- Plamen Vasilev – mixing assistance
- Filipe Melo – mixing assistance
- Julia Borelli – mastering
- Grant Strang – drums recording, percussion recording, piano recording
- Adam Shanahan – drums recording, keyboard recording
- Alex Cornish – strings recording
- Ryan Adam – Hammond Organ recording

=== Visuals ===
- Caroline Darche – illustration
- Michelle Hayward – photography

== Charts ==
Chart performance for Escape the Chaos
Chart (2025)	Peak position
Belgian Albums (Ultratop Wallonia)	197
French Albums (SNEP)	72
Scottish Albums (OCC)	23
Swiss Albums (Schweizer Hitparade)	18
UK Albums (OCC)	71
UK Independent Albums (OCC)	9
