= Blaze Away (album) =

Studio album by Morcheeba
- Released: 1 June 2018
- Length: 35:15
- Label: Fly Agaric

Morcheeba chronology
| Head Up High (2013) | Blaze Away (2018) | Blackest Blue (2021) |

Blaze Away is the ninth studio album by British electronic band Morcheeba. It was released in June 2018 under Fly Agaric Records. It is the first Morcheeba album not to have involvement by Paul Godfrey, who left the band in 2014 after the release of the previous album Head Up High. It became one of Morcheeba’s most successful albums in the U.S., peaking at 5 on Billboard Top Dance/Electronic Albums.

It is the second collaboration of Skye Edwards, the vocalist and lyricist, and Ross Godfrey, the producer and multi-instrumentalist, without the involvement of Paul Godfrey, the first having been the album Skye | Ross, having been produced under the project Skye & Ross.

== Track listing ==
| No. | Title | Writer(s) | Length |
|---|---|---|---|
| 1. | "Never Undo" | R. Godfrey; S. Edwards | 3:45 |
| 2. | "Blaze Away" (featuring Roots Manuva) | R. Godfrey; S. Edwards; Rodney Smith; Alex Watson | 4:04 |
| 3. | "Love Dub" | R. Godfrey; S. Edwards | 3:49 |
| 4. | "It’s Summertime" | R. Godfrey; S. Edwards; Kurt Wagner | 3:38 |
| 5. | "Sweet L.A." | R. Godfrey; S. Edwards; Costandia Costi | 2:41 |
| 6. | "Paris sur Mer" (featuring Benjamin Biolay) | R. Godfrey; S. Edwards; Bendjamin Biolay | 4:33 |
| 7. | "Find Another Way" | R. Godfrey; S. Edwards | 3:30 |
| 8. | "Set Your Sails" | R. Godfrey; S. Edwards | 3:27 |
| 9. | "Free of Debris" | R. Godfrey; S. Edwards | 1:03 |
| 10. | "Mezcal Dream" (featuring Amanda Zamolo) | R. Godfrey | 4:45 |
| Total length: | | | 35:20 |

iTunes Deluxe Edition
| No. | Title | Length |
|---|---|---|
| 11. | "Free of Debris (Kelpe Remix)" | 5:14 |
| 12. | "Mezcal Dream (Brecon Remix)" (featuring Amanda Zamolo) | 5:49 |
| 13. | "Find Another Way (Djrum Remix)" | 6:15 |
| 14. | "Blaze Away (Throwing Snow Remix)" | 3:23 |
| 15. | "Set Your Sails (Faltydl Remix)" | 4:00 |
| 16. | "Never Undo (Yumino Remix)" | 4:44 |
| 17. | "Free of Debris (Folamour Remix)" | 4:40 |
| 18. | "Sweet L.A. (Da Lata Remix)" | 2:58 |
| 19. | "Love Dub (Merther Hum Remix)" | 3:44 |
| 20. | "Blaze Away (Gilligan Moss Remix)" | 5:10 |
| 21. | "It's Summertime (Little Mountain Remix)" | 3:39 |
| 22. | "It's Summetime (Lindstrom & Prins Thomas Remix)" | 8:00 |

== Charts ==
| Chart | Peak position |
|---|---|
| Belgian Albums (Ultratop Wallonia) | 83 |
| Danish Albums (Hitlisten) | 73 |
| French Albums (SNEP) | 38 |
| Hungarian Albums (MAHASZ) | 39 |
| Swiss Albums (Schweizer Hitparade) | 16 |
| US Top Dance Albums (Billboard) | 5 |
