= Head Up High =

Head Up High may refer to:

- Head Up High (Morcheeba album), 2013
- Head Up High (Pandora album), 2011
- Head Up High, an album and its title track by Michael "Fitz" Fitzpatrick, 2021
- "Head Up High" (Oh Land song), 2014
- "Head Up High", a song by Black Rebel Motorcycle Club from B.R.M.C., 2001
