= Rome Wasn't Built in a Day =

Rome Wasn't Built in a Day may refer to:

- Rome wasn't built in a day, an epigram
- Rome Wasn't Built in a Day (TV series)''Rome Wasn't Built in a Day'' (TV series), a historical recreation
- "Rome Wasn't Built in a Day" (song), a 2000 pop song by Morcheeba
- A 1962 soul song by Johnnie Taylor
