= The Antidote (Morcheeba album) =

Studio album by Morcheeba
- Released: May 2005
- Length: 44:22
- Label: Echo

Morcheeba chronology
Parts of the Process (2003)	The Antidote (2005)	Dive Deep (2008)

Professional ratings
Aggregate scores
Source	Rating
Metacritic	64/100
Review scores
Source	Rating
AllMusic	3/5 stars
Pitchfork	2.7/10
PopMatters	5/10

The Antidote is the fifth album by Morcheeba, released in May 2005. It featured Daisy Martey on vocals, who replaced Skye Edwards. It was the band's first album with Echo Records. The album reached 17 on the UK Albums Chart.

== Singles ==
The album was supported by three singles; "Lighten Up", "Everybody Loves a Loser" and "Wonders Never Cease". The latter was co-written by Jody Sternberg who would later join the band on tour.

== Critical reception ==
Pitchfork gave the album a 2.7 out of ten, remarking that Daisy Martey replacing singer Skye Edwards was like "an Angela Lansbury replacing a Marilyn Monroe".

Most reviews were more favourable, if somewhat tepid. Prefix Magazine gave it a six out of ten, noting the new direction of the band was "definitely welcome." PopMatters called it a solid album, but argued that Martey's style played against the Godfrey brothers' strengths, referring to the majority of the album as a "disappointment". BBC Music, on the other hand, delivered a strong recommendation, noting its eclectic style, and ending its positive review with "For the malaise brought on by much of today's dance-by-numbers, it's an antidote, indeed."

== Track listing ==
All tracks written by P.Godfrey, R.Godfrey, D. Martey except track 1 - written by P.Godfrey, R.Godfrey, J. Sternberg.

No.	Title	Length
1.	"Wonders Never Cease"	4:13
2.	"Ten Men"	4:15
3.	"Everybody Loves a Loser"	4:34
4.	"Like a Military Coup"	3:17
5.	"Living Hell"	5:52
6.	"People Carrier"	4:21
7.	"Lighten Up"	4:15
8.	"Daylight Robbery"	2:48
9.	"Antidote"	6:20
10.	"God Bless and Goodbye"	4:24
Total length:		44:22

Japanese edition bonus tracks
No.	Title	Length
11.	"Wonders Never Cease" (Chicken Lips special 12" version)	6:39
12.	"Lighten Up" (Super Discount club mix)	6:58
Total length:		58:08

== Charts ==
Chart performance for The Antidote
Chart (2005)	Peak position
Australian Albums (ARIA)	62
Austrian Albums (Ö3 Austria)	23
Belgian Albums (Ultratop Flanders)	70
Belgian Albums (Ultratop Wallonia)	40
French Albums (SNEP)	5
German Albums (Offizielle Top 100)	40
Italian Albums (FIMI)	14
Spanish Albums (Promusicae)	47
Swiss Albums (Schweizer Hitparade)	17
UK Albums (Official Charts)	17

== Certifications ==
Region	Certification	Certified units/sales
France (SNEP)	Silver	64,200
