= Who Can You Trust? =

Studio album by Morcheeba
- Released: 1 April 1996 (UK); 24 September 1996 (US)
- Genre: Trip hop
- Length: 56:07
- Label: Indochina; Discovery; Sire
- Producer: Morcheeba; Pete Norris

Morcheeba chronology
Who Can You Trust? (1996)	Big Calm (1998)

Singles from Who Can You Trust?
- 1. "Never an Easy Way" Released: 1996; 2. "Tape Loop" Released: 1996; 3. "Trigger Hippie" Released: 1997; 4. "The Music That We Hear (Moog Island)" Released: 1997

Who Can You Trust? is the debut studio album by English electronic music group Morcheeba. It was released in 1996 on China Records in the United Kingdom and Discovery and Sire Records in the United States. Stylistically, the album is by far the band's most trip hop oriented release, consisting of languid, looping grooves, using mostly Rhodes piano, electric guitar and scratching. At the end of 1998 the album was re-issued as 2-CDs with the 8 track disc Beats & B-Sides collection.

== Reception ==
Professional ratings
Review scores
Source	Rating
AllMusic	4/5 stars
Chicago Tribune	3.5/4 stars
Entertainment Weekly	B+
Pitchfork	8.3/10
Q	4/5 stars
USA Today	3/4 stars
The Village Voice	A−

Melody Maker recommended Who Can You Trust? and remarked that Morcheeba "take up where trip hop leaves off, picking up at its outer reaches and taking it way, way off into the Indian Ocean... A strange and bitter brew indeed." Musician wrote that the band is "saved from Portishead comparisons mainly by their fondness for guitars" and that their "laid-back beats and gentle, smoky tunes are enhanced by Ry Cooder-ish slide, funky wah-wah, and other simple guitar flourishes, as well as a reappearing Hammond organ and some occasional strings." Josef Woodard of Entertainment Weekly compared vocalist Skye Edwards to "Sade filtered through Portishead" and felt that she has "enough hypnotic charms and charisma to counter the dangers of techno-riff overkill." Robert Christgau, in The Village Voice, praised the band as "always thoughtful, often sad, rarely neurotic, never scary."

== Commercial performance ==
By 1998, Who Can You Trust? had sold around 500,000 copies worldwide, and by 2003 it had passed the one million mark in worldwide sales. By 2000, combined sales of Who Can You Trust? and the group's second album Big Calm stood at 315,000 copies in the United States.

== Track listing ==
All tracks are written by Paul Godfrey, Ross Godfrey and Skye Edwards.

No.	Title	Length
1.	"Moog Island"	5:21
2.	"Trigger Hippie"	5:31
3.	"Post Houmous"	1:48
4.	"Tape Loop"	4:24
5.	"Never an Easy Way"	6:41
6.	"Howling"	3:40
7.	"Small Town"	5:09
8.	"Enjoy the Wait"	1:07
9.	"Col"	4:07
10.	"Who Can You Trust?"	8:56
11.	"Almost Done"	6:38
12.	"End Theme"	2:27
Total length:		55:56

Japanese edition bonus tracks
No.	Title	Length
13.	"The Music That We Hear (Moog Island)"	3:50
14.	"Trigger Hippie" (Newcheeba Mix)	4:01
15.	"Tape Loop" (Shortcheeba Mix)	3:49
Total length:		67:41

Beats & B-Sides – limited edition CD2
No.	Title	Length
1.	"Killer Hippie" (Bad Vibrations Mix)	4:15
2.	"On the Rhodes Again"	7:09
3.	"Tape Loop" (Diabolical Brothers Remix)	5:26
4.	"Dungeness"	5:22
5.	"Baby Sitar" (Drummer of Your Dreams Mix)	3:04
6.	"Ray Payola"	8:00
7.	"Shoulder Holster" (Diabolical Brothers Remix)	5:57
8.	"Post Houmous" (Live at the MacKie)	5:08
Total length:		44:37

== Certifications ==
Certifications for Who Can You Trust
Region	Certification	Certified units/sales
Italy (FIMI)	Platinum	100,000^{*}
United Kingdom (BPI)	Gold	100,000^{*}
^{*} Sales figures based on certification alone.
