= Daisy Martey =

British singer

Daisy Martey is a British singer, songwriter, playwright and screenwriter. She is the lead vocalist for Noonday Underground. Late in 2004, Martey left the band to become the lead singer of Morcheeba, replacing their former singer, Skye Edwards. Martey recorded the vocals for Morcheeba's fifth studio album, The Antidote, which was released in May 2005.

In 2007, she was named in Sonia Boyce's Devotional series celebrating iconic Black British singers alongside distinguished artists such as Sade and Shirley Bassey in an exhibition by the National Portrait Gallery.
