= Even Tho =

Even Tho may refer to:

- Even Tho (Joseph Arthur song), 2005
- Even Tho (Webb Pierce song), 1954

== See also ==
- Even Though, a 2010 song by Morcheeba
