= Mind How You Go (Skye Edwards album) =

Studio album by Skye Edwards
- Released: 9 October 2006 (UK); 22 August 2006 (U.S.)
- Recorded: 2004–05
- Genre: Trip hop, electronic, acoustic
- Length: 45:25
- Label: Atlantic
- Producer: Gary Clark

Skye Edwards chronology
Mind How You Go (2006)	Keeping Secrets (2009)

Professional ratings
Review scores
Source	Rating
AllMusic	3.5/5 stars

Mind How You Go is the debut solo album by British singer Skye Edwards, following her departure from Morcheeba. Despite anticipation by fans, the album achieved limited success in the UK as a result of insufficient promotion. It was more successful in other parts of Europe, particularly Poland, France, Italy and Switzerland.

== Track listing ==
1. "Love Show" (Skye Edwards, Gary Clark) – 4:03
2. "Stop Complaining" (Edwards, Patrick Leonard ) – 3:37
3. "Solitary" (Edwards, Leonard, Steve Gordon ) – 4:55
4. "Calling" (Edwards, Gordon, Leonard) – 5:23
5. "What's Wrong with Me?" (Edwards, Leonard) – 3:37
6. "No Other" (Edwards, Gordon, Pascal Gabriel) – 4:04
7. "Tell Me About Your Day" (Edwards, Leonard) – 4:00
8. "All the Promises" (Edwards, Leonard, Gordon) – 4:08
9. "Powerful" (Edwards, Gary Clark) – 4:43
10. "Say Amen" (Edwards, Gordon, Leonard) – 4:31
11. "Jamaica Days" (Edwards, Daniel Lanois) – 4:24
