= Noonday Underground =

- Origin: London, England
- Genres: Trip hop
- Years active: 2000 to Present
- Labels: Setanta
- Members: Simon Dine; Daisy Martey

Noonday Underground are a British band consisting of DJ Simon Dine and singer Daisy Martey. Dine had previously been a member of Adventures in Stereo. Martey was for a time the singer in Morcheeba. The band name came from a book about The Who.

The single "London" was featured in the soundtrack for the film The September Issue.

Their debut album Self-Assembly was released in 2000 on the M21 label, and re-issued by Setanta on 17 September 2001.

Their track "The Light Brigade", from Self-Assembly, was used as the title theme for the Channel 4 nursing drama, No Angels.

An advertisement for Google Home used their track "Spinning All Around", from the album Body Parts For Modern Art.

== Discography ==
Albums

- Self-Assembly (2000) M21
- Surface Noise (2002) Setanta
- On the Freedom Flotilla (2006) Setanta
- The K-O Chorale (12 July 2010) Setanta
- Body Parts for Modern Art (2015) Stubbie Records
- On a Quiet Night (2018)

Compilations

- Set Sail (2003) Vroom Sound

EPs

- How Happy (1997)

Singles

- "London" (1999)
- "I'll Walk Right On" (2003) (UK Singles Chart #86)
