= Charango (album) =

Studio album by Morcheeba
- Released: 2 July 2002
- Studio: Morcheeba Heads Quarter
- Genre: Trip hop
- Length: 47:20
- Label: Sire; Reprise; Warner Bros.
- Producer: Paul Godfrey; Ross Godfrey; Pete Norris

Morcheeba chronology
Fragments of Freedom (2000)	Charango (2002)	Parts of the Process (2003)

Professional ratings
Review scores
Source	Rating
AllMusic	link
Blender	2/5 stars
Pitchfork	3.6/10 link
Rolling Stone	link

Charango is the fourth studio album by English electronic music group Morcheeba, released in the first week of July 2002 through Warner Bros. Records. It also appeared as a limited edition 2-CD version with a second CD containing instrumental versions of all the tracks. The album included a number of guest appearances such as Lambchop frontman Kurt Wagner, rapper Slick Rick, singer Miriam Stockley and bass guitar player Pino Palladino. The album became one of the band's most successful, reaching the top ten in the UK charts.

The Japanese version includes a bonus track, "I'd Rather Kill Us (Than Watch You Leave)", also present on the "Way Beyond" single.

== Singles ==
Singles released included "Otherwise" and "Way Beyond". A limited edition 12" of a remixed "Women Lose Weight" was released in the UK and US. A planned third single "Undress Me Now" was abandoned despite the filming of a promotional video for the song.

== Track listing ==
No.	Title	Writer(s)	Length
1.	"Slow Down"	P. Godfrey; R. Godfrey; S. Edwards	4:12
2.	"Otherwise"	P. Godfrey; R. Godfrey; S. Edwards	3:43
3.	"Aqualung"	P. Godfrey; R. Godfrey; S. Edwards	3:24
4.	"São Paulo"	P. Godfrey; R. Godfrey; S. Edwards	4:32
5.	"Charango" (featuring Pace Won)	P. Godfrey; R. Godfrey; S. Edwards	4:03
6.	"What New York Couples Fight About" (featuring Kurt Wagner)	P. Godfrey; R. Godfrey; S. Edwards; Kurt Wagner	6:16
7.	"Undress Me Now"	P. Godfrey; R. Godfrey; S. Edwards; Kurt Wagner	3:25
8.	"Way Beyond"	P. Godfrey; R. Godfrey; S. Edwards	3:34
9.	"Women Lose Weight" (featuring Slick Rick)	P. Godfrey; R. Godfrey; S. Edwards; Slick Rick	4:18
10.	"Get Along" (featuring Pace Won)	P. Godfrey; R. Godfrey; S. Edwards	3:48
11.	"Public Displays of Affection"	P. Godfrey; R. Godfrey; S. Edwards	3:09
12.	"The Great London Traffic Warden Massacre"	P. Godfrey; R. Godfrey; S. Edwards; Nick Ingman	3:04
Total length:			47:20

Japanese edition bonus track
No.	Title	Writer(s)	Length
13.	"I'd Rather Kill Us (Than Watch You Leave)"	P. Godfrey; R. Godfrey; S. Edwards	4:52
Total length:			52:12

Australian Tour Edition bonus disc
No.	Title	Length
1.	"The Sea" (Live)	5:37
2.	"Otherwise" (Live)	3:52
3.	"Public Displays of Affection" (Live)	2:49
4.	"What New York Couples Fight About" (Live)	6:20
5.	"Blindfold" (Live)	4:35
6.	"Way Beyond" (Live)	3:10
Total length:		26:22

== Charts ==
=== Weekly charts ===
Weekly chart performance for Charango
Chart (2002)	Peak position
Australian Albums (ARIA)	19
Austrian Albums (Ö3 Austria)	8
Belgian Albums (Ultratop Wallonia)	28
French Albums (SNEP)	10
German Albums (Offizielle Top 100)	11
Hungarian Albums (MAHASZ)	19
Irish Albums (IRMA)	11
Italian Albums (FIMI)	6
New Zealand Albums (RMNZ)	17
Norwegian Albums (VG-lista)	18
Swiss Albums (Schweizer Hitparade)	4
UK Albums (OCC)	7

=== Year-end charts ===
Year-end chart performance for Charango
Chart (2002)	Position
Canadian Alternative Albums (Nielsen SoundScan)	182
UK Albums (OCC)	196

== Certifications ==
Region	Certification	Certified units/sales
Australia (ARIA)	Gold	35,000^{^}
Switzerland (IFPI Switzerland)	Gold	20,000^{^}
United Kingdom (BPI)	Gold	100,000^{^}
^{^} Shipments figures based on certification alone.
