= Gained the World =

2008 single by Morcheeba

Single by Morcheeba

from the album Dive Deep
- B-side: "Priceless"
- Released: 28 April 2008
- Recorded: 2007
- Length: 2:56
- Label: Echo, PIAS
- Songwriter: Ross Godfrey
- Producer: Paul Godfrey

Morcheeba singles chronology
"Enjoy the Ride" (2008)	"Gained the World" (2008)	"Even Though" (2010)

Music video
- "Gained the World" on YouTube

Audio sample
- file; help

"Gained the World" is the second single released from Morcheeba's sixth studio album Dive Deep. It was digitally released on 28 April 2008, while it was physically released in the United Kingdom on 26 May 2008. The song features "bittersweet" vocals of French singer Manda Zamolo.

== Composition ==
The album producer Paul Godfrey posted his opinion about song on Morcheeba's official website, writing:

It's about succeeding in every way and still feeling like there is something missing. When Manda put her voice to it, it sounded really bittersweet.

== Critical reception ==
IndieLondon noted that "Gained the World" is "a melody-laden beauty that introduces the listener to the soothing tones of French vocalist Manda for the first time."

== Music video ==
The animated music video was directed by Joel Trussell, an American artist who also made the video for "Enjoy the Ride".

== Track listing ==
The single was released as an EP containing two remixes and "Priceless" as a B-side that was not included on the album. "Priceless" features performance by Bootie Brown of Pharcyde with Merry Clayton on backing vocals and lead vocals of Judie Tzuke.

1. "Gained the World" – 2:56
2. "Priceless" – 5:52
3. "Gained the World" (Serious Music Remix) – 2:59
4. "Enjoy the Ride" (Jason Bentley Mix) – 5:57
