= Even Though =

2010 song by Morcheeba

"Even Though" is a song by British trip hop band Morcheeba. The track was the first single from Blood Like Lemonade, the seventh studio album released on 7 June 2010.

The song appeared on the official soundtrack of the American television series Shameless.

== Song background ==
The track marked Skye Edwards return since her dismissal in 2003. The lyrics were inspired by reading interviews with astronauts. The message conveyed in the song reflects the worries about humanity and the actual state of the Earth.

== Music video ==
The official music video for Even though is directed by Ian “Emma” Bonhote. Underwater shooting made for absolute matching with the song narrative. Since its premiere, the video has racked more than 1 million views on YouTube.

== Chart performance ==
Year-end chart performance for "Even Though"
Chart (2012)	Position
Ukraine Airplay (TopHit)	187

== Remixes ==
1. Even though [Mustang remix] (6:59)

2. Even though [Surfing Leons Afternoon Remix] (5:33)

3. Even though [Surfing Leons Evil Remix] (5:47)

4. Even though [Mustang Dub Remix] (5:50)
