= Big Calm =

Studio album by Morcheeba
- Released: 16 March 1998
- Genres: Electronica; trip hop
- Length: 46:48
- Labels: Indochina; Sire
- Producers: Morcheeba; Pete Norris

Morcheeba chronology
Who Can You Trust? (1996)	Big Calm (1998)	Fragments of Freedom (2000)

Singles from Big Calm
- 1. "Shoulder Houlster" Released: 1997; 2. "The Sea" Released: 1998; 3. "Blindfold" Released: 1998; 4. "Let Me See" Released: 1998; 5. "Part of the Process" Released: 1998

Professional ratings
Review scores
Source	Rating
AllMusic	4/5 stars
Chicago Tribune	3/4 stars
Entertainment Weekly	A−
The Guardian	4/5 stars
Los Angeles Times	3/4 stars
Muzik	8/10
NME	8/10
Pitchfork	6.7/10
Rolling Stone	3.5/5 stars
Spin	8/10

Big Calm is the second studio album by English electronic music group Morcheeba. It was released in March 1998 by Indochina Records and Sire Records. The album reached the top 20 of the UK Albums Chart, while the single "Part of the Process" charted in the top 40 of the UK Singles Chart in August of the same year. "The Music That We Hear", included on special-edition versions of the album, is a reworking of "Moog Island" from Morcheeba's debut album, Who Can You Trust? The album cover was inspired by that of the 1966 Ray Conniff compilation Hi Fi Companion.

== Recording and composition ==
The recording of the album started on Christmas Day 1995, as Morcheeba members Paul and Ross Godfrey were awaiting the release of Who Can You Trust?. After basic demos had been laid down at their home studio on a cassette tape, the duo brought in vocalist Skye Edwards and guest performers to complete the record. Steve Bentley-Klein provided a string-arrangement for "The Sea", while "Let Me See" features Dom Pipkin on organ and Jimmy Hastings on flute. The song "Blindfold" had been written for the film She's So Lovely, but was not deemed ready for the feature. "Friction" features Spikey T while the title track includes contributions from Jason Furlow and DJ Swamp.

== Track listing ==
All tracks are written by Paul Godfrey, Ross Godfrey and Skye Edwards, except track 11, written by Paul Godfrey, Ross Godfrey, Skye Edwards and Jason Furlow.

No.	Title	Length
1.	"The Sea"	5:47
2.	"Shoulder Holster"	4:04
3.	"Part of the Process"	4:24
4.	"Blindfold"	4:37
5.	"Let Me See"	4:20
6.	"Bullet Proof"	4:11
7.	"Over and Over"	2:20
8.	"Friction"	4:13
9.	"Diggin' a Watery Grave"	1:34
10.	"Fear and Love"	5:04
11.	"Big Calm"	6:00
Total length:		46:48

US edition bonus track
No.	Title	Length
12.	"The Music That We Hear"	3:50
Total length:		50:38

Japanese edition bonus tracks
No.	Title	Length
12.	"Shoulder Holster" (Radio Mix)	4:14
13.	"Shoulder Holster" (Diabolical Brothers Mix)	5:56
Total length:		56:58

== Personnel ==
- Skye Edwards – vocals
- Paul Godfrey – Lyrics, Production, beat sample programming, scratching, live drums.
- Ross Godfrey – Chords, all guitars, sitar, pedal steel, lap steel, clavinet, Hammond, Fender Rhodes, Wurlitzer piano, drums, EMS synthesizer and MKS 80
- Pete Norris – sound manipulation, synthesizer programming
- Spikey-T – Jamaican vocals on "Friction"
- Jason Furlow aka Nosaj the Great – rapping on "Big Calm"
- Dave Lee – French Horn on "Over and Over" and "Fear and Love"

== Charts ==
=== Weekly charts ===
Chart (1998)	Peak position
Australian Albums (ARIA)	67
Austrian Albums (Ö3 Austria)	22
French Albums (SNEP)	18
German Albums (Offizielle Top 100)	81
Hungarian Albums (MAHASZ)	33
New Zealand Albums (RMNZ)	17
Norwegian Albums (VG-lista)	22
Scottish Albums (Official Charts)	34
Swiss Albums (Schweizer Hitparade)	37
UK Albums (Official Charts)	18

=== Year-end charts ===
Chart (1998)	Position
New Zealand Albums (RMNZ)	38
UK Albums (OCC)	69

== Certifications and sales ==
Region	Certification	Certified units/sales
Australia (ARIA)	Gold	35,000^{^}
Canada (Music Canada)	Gold	50,000^{^}
France (SNEP)	Gold	100,000^{*}
Italy	—	125,000
United Kingdom (BPI)	2× Platinum	600,000^{‡}
United States	—	250,000
Summaries
Worldwide	—	2,000,000
^{*} Sales figures based on certification alone.^{^} Shipments figures based on certification alone.^{‡} Sales+streaming figures based on certification alone.
