= Rome Wasn't Built in a Day (song) =

2000 single by Morcheeba

Single by Morcheeba

from the album Fragments of Freedom
- B-side: "Frogmarched to Freedom"; "In the Hands of the Gods"
- Released: 3 July 2000
- Studio: Morcheeba Heads Quarter (South London, England)
- Genre: Blues
- Length: 3:35
- Label: EastWest
- Songwriters: Paul Godfrey; Ross Godfrey; Skye Edwards
- Producers: Paul Godfrey; Ross Godfrey; Pete Norris

Morcheeba singles chronology
"Summertime" (1998)	"Rome Wasn't Built in a Day" (2000)	"Be Yourself" (2000)

Music video
- "Rome Wasn't Built in a Day" on YouTube

"Rome Wasn't Built in a Day" is a song by English musical group Morcheeba. It was released in Europe on 3 July 2000 as the lead single from their third studio album, Fragments of Freedom (2000), and was given a UK release on 24 July. The song is the group's biggest hit in their native United Kingdom, where it peaked at number 34. In New Zealand, the song reached number two and was the 13th-most successful single of 2000. It is reported to have reached the top 10 in 10 countries altogether.

== Track listings ==
All versions of "In the Hands of the Gods" feature Biz Markie.

UK CD1 and cassette single

1. "Rome Wasn't Built in a Day" – 3:34
2. "Frogmarched to Freedom" – 4:59
3. "In the Hands of the Gods" (Tumbleweed Gunslinger mix) – 4:16

UK CD2

1. "Rome Wasn't Built in a Day" – 3:34
2. "In the Hands of the Gods" (Cheeky Cheeba Chainsaw mix) – 3:19
3. "Rome Wasn't Built in a Day" (video)

European CD single

1. "Rome Wasn't Built in a Day" – 3:34
2. "In the Hands of the Gods" (Tumbleweed Gunslinger mix) – 4:15

Australian CD single

1. "Rome Wasn't Built in a Day" – 3:34
2. "In the Hands of the Gods" (Cheeky Cheeba Chainsaw mix) – 3:19
3. "Frogmarched to Freedom" – 4:59
4. "In the Hands of the Gods" (Tumbleweed Gunslinger mix) – 4:15
5. "Rome Wasn't Built in a Day" (enhanced video)

== Credits and personnel ==
Credits are lifted from the Fragments of Freedom album booklet.

Studio

- Recorded and mixed at Morcheeba Heads Quarter (South London, England)

Personnel

- Paul Godfrey – writing, production, mixing, arrangement
- Ross Godfrey – writing, production, mixing, arrangement
- Skye Edwards – writing, all vocals
- Derek Green – backing vocals, additional vocal production
- Paul Jason Fredericks – backing vocals
- Joy Rose – backing vocals
- Dee Lewis – backing vocals
- Steve Gordon – bass
- Dan Goldman – Fender Rhodes piano, Hammond C3 organ
- Martin Carling – drums
- Chris White – tenor and baritone saxophone
- Steve Sidwell – trumpet
- Steve Bentley-Klein – violin, string arrangement
- Pete Norris – production, mixing, arrangement

== Charts ==
=== Weekly charts ===
Chart (2000)	Peak position
Australia (ARIA)	28
Belgium (Ultratip Bubbling Under Flanders)	11
Belgium (Ultratip Bubbling Under Wallonia)	10
Europe (Eurochart Hot 100)	89
Germany (GfK)	70
Ireland (IRMA)	48
Italy (FIMI)	7
Italy Airplay (Music & Media)	5
Netherlands (Single Top 100)	82
New Zealand (Recorded Music NZ)	2
Poland (Nielsen Music Control)	1
Scottish Singles Sales (Official Charts)	24
Switzerland (Schweizer Hitparade)	33
UK Singles (Official Charts)	34

=== Year-end charts ===
Chart (2000)	Position
New Zealand (RIANZ)	13

== Release history ==
Region	Date	Format(s)	Label(s)	Ref(s).
Europe	3 July 2000	CD	WEA	
United Kingdom	24 July 2000	CD; cassette	EastWest	
