= Morcheeba =

English electronic band

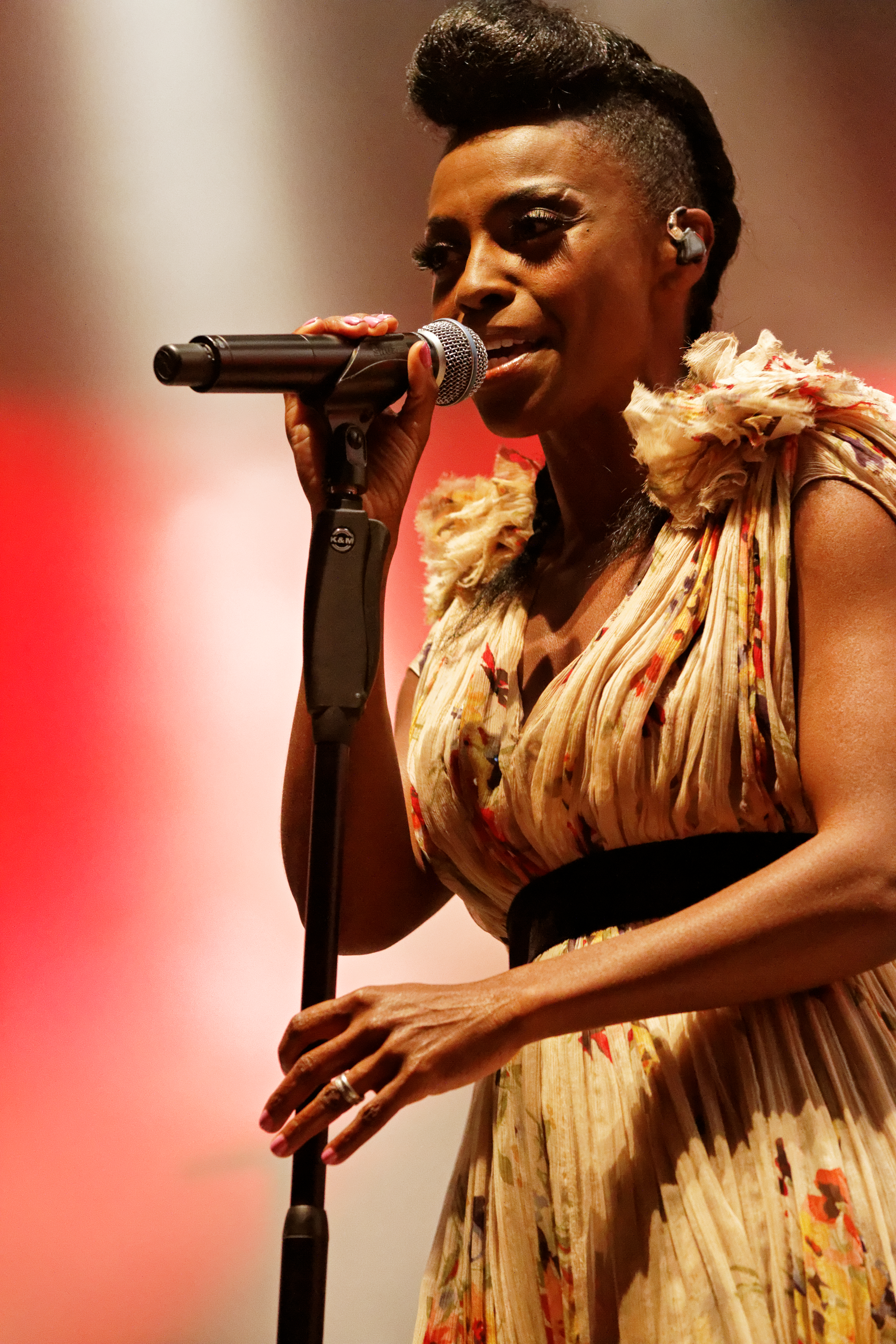
- Skye Edwards in concert, 2014

Background information
- Origin: Folkestone, Kent, England
- Genres: Trip hop; electronic; alternative rock; R&B; downtempo
- Years active: 1995–present
- Labels: Indochina; Echo; Sire; Reprise; Warner Bros. Records; Discovery
- Members: Skye Edwards; Ross Godfrey
- Past members: Paul Godfrey; Daisy Martey
- Website: morcheeba.uk

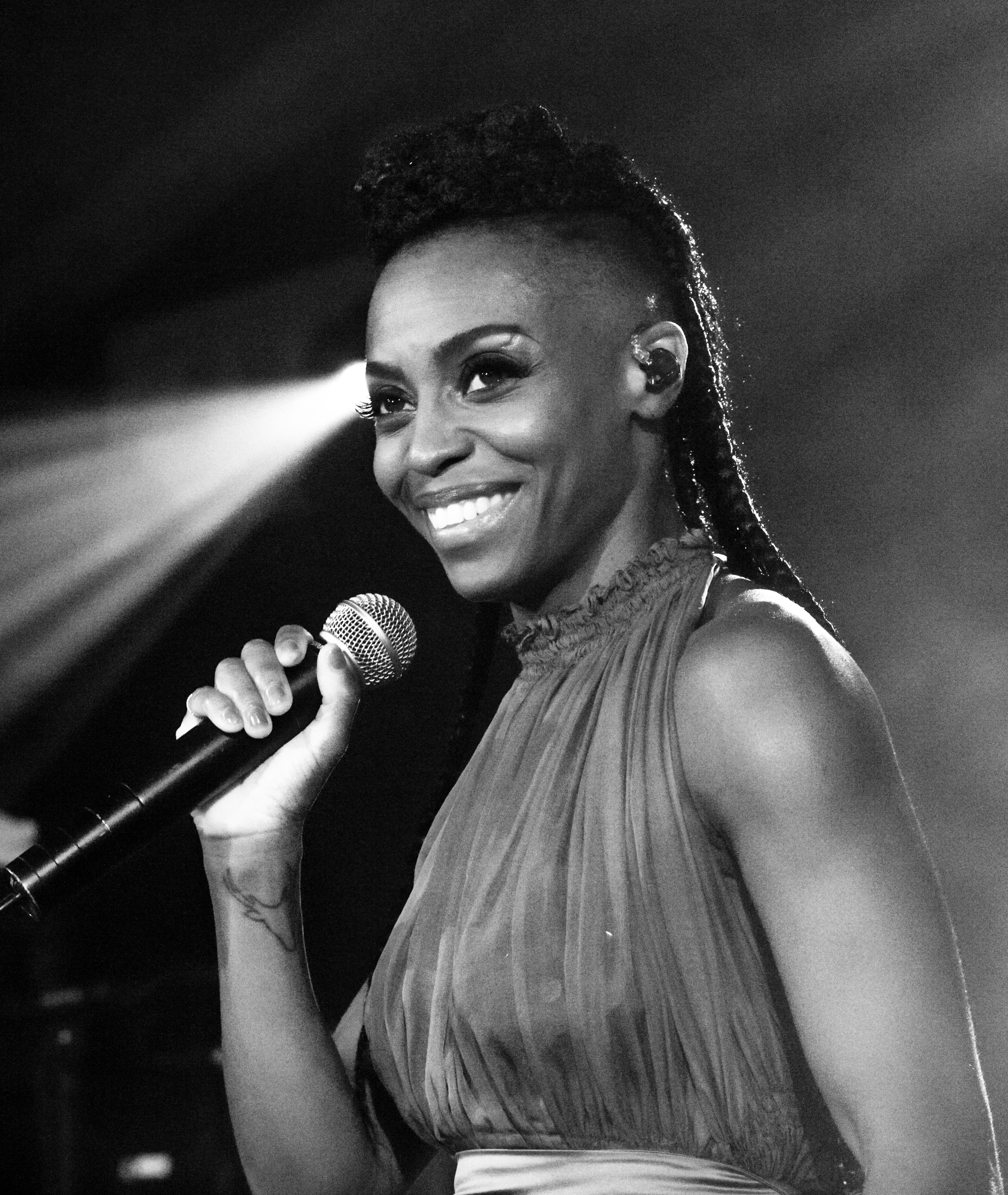
Skye Edwards at the Zelt-Musik-Festival 2018 in Freiburg, Germany

Morcheeba are an English electronic band formed in the mid-1990s with founding members brothers Paul and Ross Godfrey who later recruited vocalist Skye Edwards. They mix influences from trip hop, rock, folk rock and downtempo, and have produced eleven regular studio albums since 1995, two of which reached the UK top ten. Edwards left the band in 2003, after which the brothers used a number of guest singers before she rejoined in 2010. They recruit additional members for their live performances and have toured internationally. Paul Godfrey distanced himself from the band in 2014. Edwards and Ross Godfrey later formed Skye & Ross and released a self-titled album in September 2016. Their latest studio album without Paul as Morcheeba, Escape the Chaos, was released in 2025.

== Biography ==
=== 1995–2001: Beginnings and mainstream success ===
Originally from the small village of Saltwood, just north of Hythe, Kent, the Godfrey brothers—DJ/Drummer/producer/engineer and lyricist Paul and multi-instrumentalist Ross—moved to London when they were gaining traction from A&R people.

Sometime in the mid-1990s, at a party in Greenwich, the brothers met Skye Edwards, who was singing backup in a funk band, and also played the guitar; before too long the three began recording songs together, and formed the trio Morcheeba. At first, Paul produced tracks at their home studio in his bedroom. They were eventually signed to China Records (WMG) by Angus Blair (A&R) and the band released their debut Trigger Hippie EP in October 1995. At the same time, Paul Ablett came on board as the second manager. The band's debut album, Who Can You Trust?, was released in April 1996 and fitted snugly into the trip hop genre through a combination of Paul Godfrey's hip hop roots, Ross Godfrey's psychedelic rock influences and Edwards' soul-styled vocals. A second single, "Tape Loop", appeared in July 1996 and was a hit on BBC Radio 1 and TV. The band began to play live non-stop in Europe and North America, with a live band that included five additional members. At this point, the band had outgrown the home recording set-up and the brothers were renting their own studio in Battersea, as Paul was heavily influenced by the Beastie Boys and wanted total creative freedom, having engineered many different styles in Kent before starting the project. Being a sample seeker, he felt he knew the versatile way to keep albums interesting. In 1997, after a mind-blowing phone call Paul had with a family hero, they contributed to the David Byrne album Feelings, participating in the recording and production of the release when they weren't on the road.

With a more high-end analogue recording set-up, and the fact the brothers had written most of "Big Calm" in an evening in 1995 before the release of their debut, they began developing their ideas for the second album. The band moved towards a more varied sound with Ross' skills and collaborators brought in by Paul. At the same time, Edwards appeared on the BBC charity single "Perfect Day". The follow-up, 1998's Big Calm, drifted slightly away from trip hop, incorporating a more Californian, folk song-based sound. One of the album's singles, "The Sea", became a radio favourite. The album proved to be a big seller and ensured Morcheeba as an influential act of the zeitgeist. In 1998, Morcheeba collaborated with Hubert Laws to record the classic song "Summertime" for the Red Hot Organization's compilation album Red Hot + Rhapsody, a tribute to George Gershwin, which raised money for various charities devoted to increasing AIDS awareness and fighting the disease. Their music video "Part Of The Process" are inspired of Jason and the Argonauts (1963 film).

In 2000, Morcheeba released their third album, Fragments of Freedom. This repeated the sales of Big Calm but being too far ahead of the nu-disco trend it received a less positive critical response. Despite achieving success in Europe including their home country of the U.K., the band didn't find as much success in the United States. Although Fragments of Freedom was high charting in several European countries, it disappointed some fans. But the band's fourth album, Charango, released in 2002, saw a return to their roots. The singles "Otherwise" and "Way Beyond" followed. The lyrics for "Undress Me Now" and appearance on "What New York Couples Fight About" were written with Lambchop's Kurt Wagner. Other collaborators on the album were rappers Pace Won and old-school legend Slick Rick. In January 2003, the whole band undertook their first significant tour of the world since 1998. In 2001, the Godfrey brothers contributed three songs to the Jim White album No Such Place.

=== 2003–2008: Split and Dive Deep ===
By the end of 2003, the Godfrey brothers split with Edwards, citing creative and personal differences. Edwards received "a phone call from our manager saying that it was over. It was a relief to think we didn't have to continue". She was under the impression that the band had ceased to operate. A greatest hits compilation, Parts of the Process, helped to retain interest in the band and featured two new tracks: "What's Your Name" (featuring a rhyming cameo from Big Daddy Kane) and "Can't Stand It". At around the same time, they released the live DVD Morcheeba: From Brixton to Beijing. A decade later, Ross Godfrey reflected on this period, saying: "We just felt like we couldn't breathe, I'd been in the band and on the road since I was 18, so to have any kind of break from that was just amazing".

The two brothers reunited the year after, leaving Paul to explain that "Ross and I realised that Morcheeba was kind of our family company, and that we wanted very much to keep it going, hence the change". In 2005, Morcheeba released their fifth studio (and first post-Edwards) album, The Antidote. Daisy Martey (formerly of the band Noonday Underground) was recruited to replace Edwards as the album vocalist. However, Martey's period with the band was brief and she was sacked in the middle of the promotional tour, to be replaced by Jody Sternberg. Martey subsequently sued the band for assault, breach of contract and defamation but settled soon after. Sternberg's own tenure with the band was similarly brief, and she only appeared to have been part of the band to fulfil tour dates. According to Ross, the entire episode "was difficult to say the least. It left us in near-ruin".

After a break of 3 years, Morcheeba released their sixth studio album, Dive Deep, in February 2008. On this album, Paul Godfrey fell back into his role as principal producer collaborating with Dan Goldman on many tracks (as Ross had moved to L.A.) and selecting five final vocalists to perform the songs. The folk-rock singer Judie Tzuke, Norwegian star Thomas Dybdahl and blues singer/guitarist Bradley Burgess appeared as lead vocalists together with the Korean-American rapper Cool Calm Pete and French singer Manda (Amanda Zamolo). Both Manda and Burgess toured with Morcheeba as lead singers on their 2008 tour.

=== 2009–2013: Reunion, Blood Like Lemonade and Head Up High ===
As a solo artist, Edwards remained with the same management company as Morcheeba—Chris Morrison the CM of CMO Management represented both artists—which led to a chance meeting in their London offices sometime in 2009. Edwards and the Godfrey brothers met again to discuss her possible involvement in a new project. Initially the singer was hesitant and pointed out that she "really enjoyed doing my solo stuff and writing my own lyrics". Eventually, Edwards rejoined the band and the trio began work on a new album, with Edwards still on tour promoting her solo album, Ross Godfrey living in California and Paul Godfrey in France. On 12 February 2010, NME revealed that Edwards was once again back with the band, which was confirmed by Paul Godfrey the day after on the band's Myspace blog. Edwards made her live return with the band at the Caprices Festival, Switzerland on 9 April 2010. Edwards' role in the band changed, as she had "become more confident" in her "ability as a singer and a songwriter", and found that during the recording process they were "more honest with each other", and thus they produced "a more honest record".

Morcheeba released their seventh album, Blood Like Lemonade, on PIAS in June 2010, preceded by the single "Even Though". It was produced and mastered by Paul Godfrey, who described the album as "a warm, fuzzy blanket of psychedelia", while Edwards described the lyrics as "having dark themes". She also remarked on how the brothers had made her part of the creative process again. An eighteen-month tour followed that saw the band play around the Americas and Europe.

Their eighth album, Head Up High, was released on 14 October 2013, again on PIAS. In 2014, the band toured Australia, with a line-up consisting of Skye Edwards (vocals), Ross Godfrey (guitars), Steve Gordon (bass), Richard Milner (keyboards), Martin Carling (drums) and James Anthony (turntables).

=== 2014–2016: Departure of Paul Godfrey and Skye & Ross release ===
In 2014, Paul Godfrey was "bored of reinventing the wheel and didn't enjoy touring" so he withdrew from the band. Ross Godfrey later explained: "Paul and I had not been getting on musically, or personally and after the Head Up High album in 2013, Paul told us he was possibly leaving the band. Skye and I thought it best to just release the record we had made under our own names. There will be no more Morcheeba albums". Paul Godfrey has since established a recording studio, Sacrosync Sound, in St Leonards near Hastings and recorded a new album, Cool Your Soul, with Rachel Cuming, the singer who had attracted the record companies on early demos under the moniker Morcheeba Productions.

Ross Godfrey and Skye Edwards announced a new project in 2016 named Skye & Ross. They have toured, and released an eponymous album on 2 September 2016. The band started as an acoustic duo but soon included Edwards' son Jaega (drums), her husband Steve Gordon (bass) and Godfrey's wife Amanda Zamolo (backing vocals). Edwards took responsibility for the lyrics while Ross Godfrey noted that the recording process was "a very organic experience".

=== 2018–2022: Blaze Away and Blackest Blue ===
Blaze Away, Morcheeba's ninth album, was released on 1 June 2018. The album featured the singles "Never Undo", "Blaze Away" and "It's Summertime". On 14 May 2021, Morcheeba released their tenth album, Blackest Blue. It features collaborations with Duke Garwood and Brad Barr and was preceded by singles "Sounds of Blue", "Oh Oh Yeah" and "The Moon". Blackest Blue did not enter the Official Albums UK Top 100 Chart, but peaked at number 14 on the Official Album Downloads Chart Top 100.

=== 2023–present: Escape the Chaos ===
Skye Edwards revealed in a June 2023 interview that the band had begun working on their eleventh album with ten tracks in the demo phase.

From June to October 2024 the band toured European festivals, including the 2024 Meltdown at London's South Bank Centre curated by Chaka Khan.

In January 2025, the band released the single "Call for Love", which is the lead single from their eleventh studio album, Escape the Chaos, released on 23 May 2025. A second single, "We Live and Die", was released on 28 February 2025. "Peace of Me", a collaboration with Oscar #Worldpeace, was released on 8 April 2025.

== Band name ==
The name "Morcheeba" comes from the initials "MOR" ("middle of the road") as a joke and needing more "cheeba", a slang term used by Paul's idol Schoolly D for cannabis.

== Discography ==
Morcheeba discography
- Studio albums: 11
- Compilation albums: 6
- Singles: 31

=== Studio albums ===
Title	Album details	Peak chart positions										Certifications (sales thresholds)
Title	Album details	UK	AUS	AUT	FRA	GER	ITA	NOR	NZ	SWI	US Dance	Certifications (sales thresholds)
Who Can You Trust?	Released: 1 April 1996; Label: Indochina/Discovery; Format: CD, CS	57	174	—	—	—	—	—	—	—	—	BPI: Gold; ARIA: Gold
Big Calm	Released: 16 March 1998; Label: Indochina/Sire; Format: CD, LP	18	67	22	18	81	17	22	17	37	—	BPI: 2× Platinum; ARIA: Gold; MC: Gold; SNEP: Gold
Fragments of Freedom	Released: 1 August 2000; Label: Sire/WEA; Format: CD, LP, MD	6	11	13	10	19	3	7	15	7	—	BPI: Gold; ARIA: Gold; IFPI SWI: Gold; SNEP: Gold
Charango	Released: 2 July 2002; Label: Sire/WEA; Format: CD, LP	7	19	8	10	11	6	18	17	4	—	BPI: Gold; ARIA: Gold; IFPI SWI: Gold
The Antidote	Released: 31 May 2005; Label: Echo; Format: CD	17	62	23	5	40	14	—	—	3	—	
Dive Deep	Released: 19 February 2008; Label: Echo/Ultra; Format: CD	59	149	42	15	44	55	—	—	8	15	
Blood Like Lemonade	Released: 13 July 2010; Label: PIAS; Format: CD	111	—	30	13	26	75	—	—	3	10	
Head Up High	Release date: 14 October 2013; Label: PIAS; Format: CD, LP, MP3, AAC	99	—	39	25	51	75	—	—	9	8	
Blaze Away	Release date: 1 June 2018; Label: Fly Agaric; Format: CD, LP, MP3, AAC	—	—	—	71	73	—	—	—	16	5	
Blackest Blue	Released: 14 May 2021; Label: Fly Agaric; Format: CD, LP, MP3, AAC	— (Note: Blackest Blue did not enter the Official Albums UK Top 100 Chart, but peaked at number 14 on the Official Album Downloads Chart Top 100.)	—	—	79	24	—	—	—	15	—	
Escape the Chaos	Released: 23 May 2025; Label: 100% Records; Format: CD, streaming, digital download	71	—	—	—	—	—	—	—	18	—	
"—" denotes releases that did not chart.

=== Charted compilation albums and others ===
Title	Album details	Peak chart positions		Certifications (sales thresholds)
Title	Album details	UK	AUS	Certifications (sales thresholds)
Parts of the Process	Released: June 2003; Label: China, Reprise; Format: CD	6	85	BPI: Platinum

=== Singles ===
Title	Year	Peak chart positions									Certifications	Album
Title	Year	UK	AUS	FRA	IRE	NLD	NZ	RUS	SWI	US Dance	Certifications	Album
"Never an Easy Way"	1996	—	—	—	—	—	—	—	—	—		Who Can You Trust?
"Tape Loop"	1996	42	164	—	—	—	—	—	—	—		Who Can You Trust?
"Trigger Hippie"	1996	40	180	—	—	—	—	—	—	—		Who Can You Trust?
"The Music That We Hear (Moog Island)"	1997	47	—	—	—	—	—	—	—	—		Who Can You Trust?
"Shoulder Holster"	1997	53	—	—	—	—	—	—	—	—		Big Calm
"The Sea"	1998	—	—	—	—	—	—	—	—	—	BPI: Gold	Big Calm
"Blindfold"	1998	56	178	—	—	—	—	—	—	—		Big Calm
"Let Me See"	1998	46	—	—	—	—	—	46	—	—		Big Calm
"Part of the Process"	1998	38	—	—	—	—	—	—	—	—		Big Calm
"Summertime"	1998	—	—	—	—	—	—	—	—	—		Red Hot + Rhapsody: The Gershwin Groove
"Rome Wasn't Built in a Day"	2000	34	28	—	48	82	2	—	33	—		Fragments of Freedom
"Be Yourself"	2000	89	164	—	—	—	41	—	—	—		Fragments of Freedom
"World Looking In"	2001	48	—	—	36	—	—	—	—	—		Fragments of Freedom
"Otherwise"	2002	64	125	—	—	—	—	—	72	5		Charango
"Way Beyond"	2002	147	—	—	—	—	—	—	—	—		Charango
"Undress Me Now"	2002	—	—	—	—	—	—	—	—	—		Charango
"What's Your Name" (featuring Big Daddy Kane)	2003	—	180	—	—	—	—	—	—	—		Parts of the Process
"Wonders Never Cease"	2005	86	—	—	—	86	—	114	—	—		The Antidote
"Lighten Up"	2005	—	—	—	—	—	—	—	—	—		The Antidote
"Everybody Loves a Loser"	2005	—	—	—	—	—	—	—	—	—		The Antidote
"Enjoy the Ride"	2008	182	—	—	—	—	—	163	—	—		Dive Deep
"Gained the World"	2008	—	—	—	—	—	—	180	—	—		Dive Deep
"Even Though"	2010	—	—	—	—	—	—	—	—	—		Blood Like Lemonade
"Blood Like Lemonade"	2010	—	—	—	—	—	—	—	—	—		Blood Like Lemonade
"Gimme Your Love"	2013	—	—	123	—	—	—	—	—	—		Head Up High
"Never Undo"	2018	—	—	—	—	—	—	—	—	—		Blaze Away
"Blaze Away"	2018	—	—	—	—	—	—	—	—	—		Blaze Away
"It's Summertime"	2018	—	—	—	—	—	—	—	—	—		Blaze Away
"Sounds of Blue"	2021	—	—	—	—	—	—	—	—	—		Blackest Blue
"Oh Oh Yeah"	2021	—	—	—	—	—	—	—	—	—		Blackest Blue
"The Moon"	2021	—	—	—	—	—	—	—	—	—		Blackest Blue
"Call for Love"	2025	—	—	—	—	—	—	—	—	—		Escape the Chaos
"We Live and Die"	2025	—	—	—	—	—	—	—	—	—		Escape the Chaos
"Peace of Me" (with Oscar #Worldpeace)	2025	—	—	—	—	—	—	—	—	—		Escape the Chaos
"—" denotes releases that did not chart.
