= Head Up High (Morcheeba album) =

Studio album by Morcheeba
- Released: 14 October 2013
- Genres: Electronic dance, synthpop
- Length: 48:12
- Label: PIAS
- Producer: Paul Godfrey

Morcheeba chronology
Blood Like Lemonade (2010)	Head Up High (2013)	Blaze Away (2018)

Singles from Head Up High
- 1. "Gimme Your Love" Released: 15 July 2013; 2. "Make Believer" Released: 18 August 2014

Professional ratings
Aggregate scores
Source	Rating
Metacritic	57/100
Review scores
Source	Rating
AllMusic	3.5/5 stars
Exclaim!	7/10
musicOMH	2.5/5 stars

Head Up High is the eighth studio album by the British band Morcheeba, released on 14 October 2013. In 2014 it was awarded a double silver certification from the Independent Music Companies Association, which indicated sales of at least 40,000 copies throughout Europe.It became one of Morcheeba’s most successful albums in the U.S., peaking at 8 on Billboard Top Dance/Electronic Albums.

== Track listing ==
No.	Title	Writer(s)	Length
1.	"Gimme Your Love"	P. Godfrey; R. Godfrey; S. Edwards	4:49
2.	"Face Of Danger" (featuring Chali 2na))	P. Godfrey; R. Godfrey; S. Edwards; C. Stewart	3:56
3.	"Call It Love"	P. Godfrey; R. Godfrey; S. Edwards; J. Petralli	3:59
4.	"Under The Ice"	P. Godfrey; R. Godfrey; S. Edwards	3:40
5.	"I'll Fall Apart"	P. Godfrey; R. Godfrey; S. Edwards; J. Petralli	2:06
6.	"Make Believer"	P. Godfrey; R. Godfrey; S. Edwards	3:41
7.	"Release Me Now" (featuring Nature Boy Jim Kelly)	P. Godfrey; R. Godfrey; S. Edwards; J. Furlow	4:09
8.	"To Be" (featuring Rizzle Kicks)	P. Godfrey; R. Godfrey; S. Edwards; J. Stephens; H. Alexander-Sule	4:39
9.	"Hypnotized" (featuring Ana Tijoux)	P. Godfrey; R. Godfrey; S. Edwards; A. Tijoux	4:03
10.	"To The Grave"	P. Godfrey; R. Godfrey; S. Edwards	5:13
11.	"Do You Good"	P. Godfrey; R. Godfrey; S. Edwards	3:33
12.	"Finally Found You"	P. Godfrey; R. Godfrey; S. Edwards; J. Petralli	4:23
Total length:			48:20

iTunes Bonus track
No.	Title	Length
13.	"Whirlwind"	3:31
Total length:		51:51

== Charts ==
Chart (2013)	Peak position
Austrian Albums (Ö3 Austria)	39
French Albums (SNEP)	25
German Albums (Offizielle Top 100)	51
Hungarian Albums (MAHASZ)	10
Polish Albums (ZPAV)	48
Swiss Albums (Schweizer Hitparade)	9
UK Albums (Official Charts)	99
UK Independent Albums (Official Charts)	18
US Top Dance Albums (Billboard)	8
