= Skye Edwards =

British singer

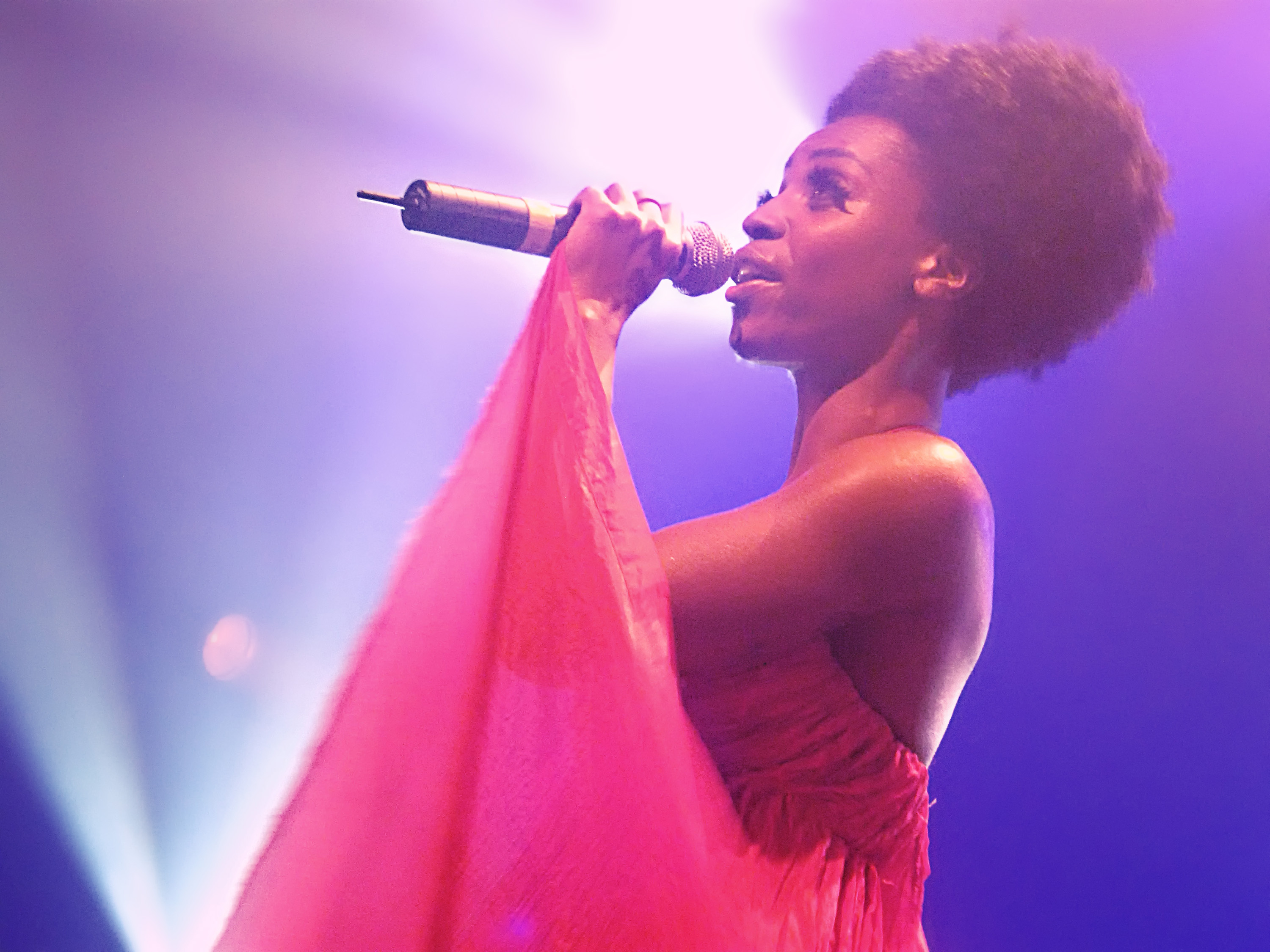
- Edwards (Paris, 2010)

Background information
- Also known as: Shirley; Skye
- Born: Shirley Klaris Yonavieve Edwards; 27 May 1972 (age 54); London, England
- Genres: Trip hop; electronic; alternative rock
- Occupation: Singer
- Years active: 1995–present
- Label: Independent
- Member of: Morcheeba

Skye Edwards (born Shirley Klaris Yonavieve Edwards; 27 May 1972), sometimes simply Skye, is a British singer. Her career began in the mid-1990s when she and the Godfrey brothers (Paul Godfrey, a DJ, and Ross Godfrey, a multi-instrumentalist) formed the band Morcheeba, which released five albums with Edwards as lead vocalist. In 2003, the band split, after which she released two solo albums: Mind How You Go in 2006, and Keeping Secrets in 2009. In 2010, Edwards returned to Morcheeba, again as lead vocalist. In 2012, she released her third solo album, Back to Now, and in 2015 she released her fourth album, In a Low Light.

Edwards decided to shorten her name to Skye by taking the first letter of each of her names and putting them together. She is married to bass player Steve Gordon and they have four children. Edwards has sung on two charity collaborations: "Perfect Day" (1997, in aid of Children in Need) and Band Aid 20 (2004, in aid of famine relief in Sudan, Africa).

== Early life ==
Edwards was born to a British Jamaican family in London and grew up in the East End. She described her growing up as 'I always say it was fish and chips, not rice and peas in our house'. Her first musical influences were the country and western records of her mother.

=== Mind How You Go ===
Produced by Patrick Leonard, Edwards' first solo album, Mind How You Go, was released on 27 February 2006 in Europe. The first single, "Love Show", was a radio hit throughout Europe. The next single was "What's Wrong With Me". Music videos were released with both songs. She has said: "People ask what this record means to me, but that's an alien question because I've been living and breathing it. It's not a question of what it means to me. This record is me."

=== Keeping Secrets ===
In October 2009, Edwards released her second album, Keeping Secrets independently via her own label, Skyewards Recordings. Produced by Alexis Smith and Emmy nominated Grace Jones collaborator Ivor Guest. A single, "I Believe", was released along with a music video and she completed a tour of several weeks around Europe.

=== Back to Now ===
This album was released on 29 October 2012 and produced by Steve Fitzmaurice, Irish record producer of, among others, Depeche Mode and U2.

== Cover songs ==
In 2007, Edwards performed the Gorillaz song "Feel Good Inc." live on KCRW radio station, along with other tracks from her album, and also at some live shows. In 2008, Edwards collaborated with Marc Collin of the French group Nouvelle Vague who put together Hollywood, Mon Amour, an album of popular songs from films of the 1980s. Edwards sang several songs on this album, including Blondie's "Call Me" and Duran Duran's "A View to a Kill" from the James Bond film of the same name.

As a Christmas gift to her fans, Edwards recorded a version of "River" by Joni Mitchell which was uploaded to YouTube in November 2011. On the John Martyn tribute album Johnny Boy Would Love This....A Tribute to John Martyn, released also in 2011, Edwards sang the track "Solid Air" from Martyn's 1973 album Solid Air.

In February 2013, Edwards performed "As Long as You Love Me" by Justin Bieber on KCRW, Morning Becomes Eclectic. She also sang on Uncovered: QOTSA, by Olivier Libaux of the French band Nouvelle Vague; it is an album of Queens of the Stone Age songs covered by female singers, which was released on 10 June 2013 digitally, and on vinyl in limited edition.

In 2020, Edwards performed the Yazz song "The Only Way Is Up" for the compilation Goodnight Songs for Rebel Girls produced by Rebel Girls, which involved a lineup of 19 female singers including Ani DiFranco, Macy Gray, Alicia Keys, Carole King and Anastacia.

== Discography ==
- Mind How You Go (2006)
- Keeping Secrets (2009)
- Back to Now (2012)
- In a Low Light (2015)
